= List of foreign Premier League players =

This is a list of foreign players in the Premier League, which commenced play in 1992. The following players must meet both of the following two criteria:

1. Have played at least one Premier League game. Players who were signed by Premier League clubs, but only played in a lower league, cup, and/or European games, or did not play in any competitive games at all, are not included.
2. Are considered foreign, i.e., outside the United Kingdom determined by the following:

A player is considered foreign if his allegiance is not to play for the national teams of England, Scotland, Wales or Northern Ireland.

More specifically,

- If a player has been capped at an international level, the national team is used; if he has been capped by more than one country, the highest level (or the most recent) team is used. These include British players with dual citizenship.
- If a player has not been capped at the international level, his country of birth is used, except for those who were born abroad from British parents or moved to the United Kingdom at a young age, and those who clearly indicated to have switched his nationality to another nation.

Clubs listed are those for which the player has played at least one Premier League game – and seasons are those in which the player has played at least one Premier League game. Note that seasons, not calendar years, are used. For example, "1992–95" indicates that the player has played in every season from 1992–93 to 1994–95, but not necessarily every calendar year from 1992 to 1995. Therefore, a player should always have a listing under at least two years – for instance, a player making his debut in 2011, during the 2011–12 season, will have '2011–12' after his name. This follows the general practice in expressing sporting seasons in the UK.

123 of the 211 foreign FIFA-affiliated nations have been represented in the Premier League. On 24 October 2026, Luxembourg became the most recent country to be represented, when Brian Madjo, previously capped by the Luxembourg national football team, made his league debut for Aston Villa.

In bold: players who have played at least one Premier League game in the current season (2026–27), and are still at a club for which they have played. This does not include current players of a Premier League club who have not played a Premier League game in the current season.

For each country, the leading appearance-maker is indicated by the number of matches that he played in the Premier League.

Details correct as of 12 September 2026.

== Africa (CAF) ==
=== Algeria ===
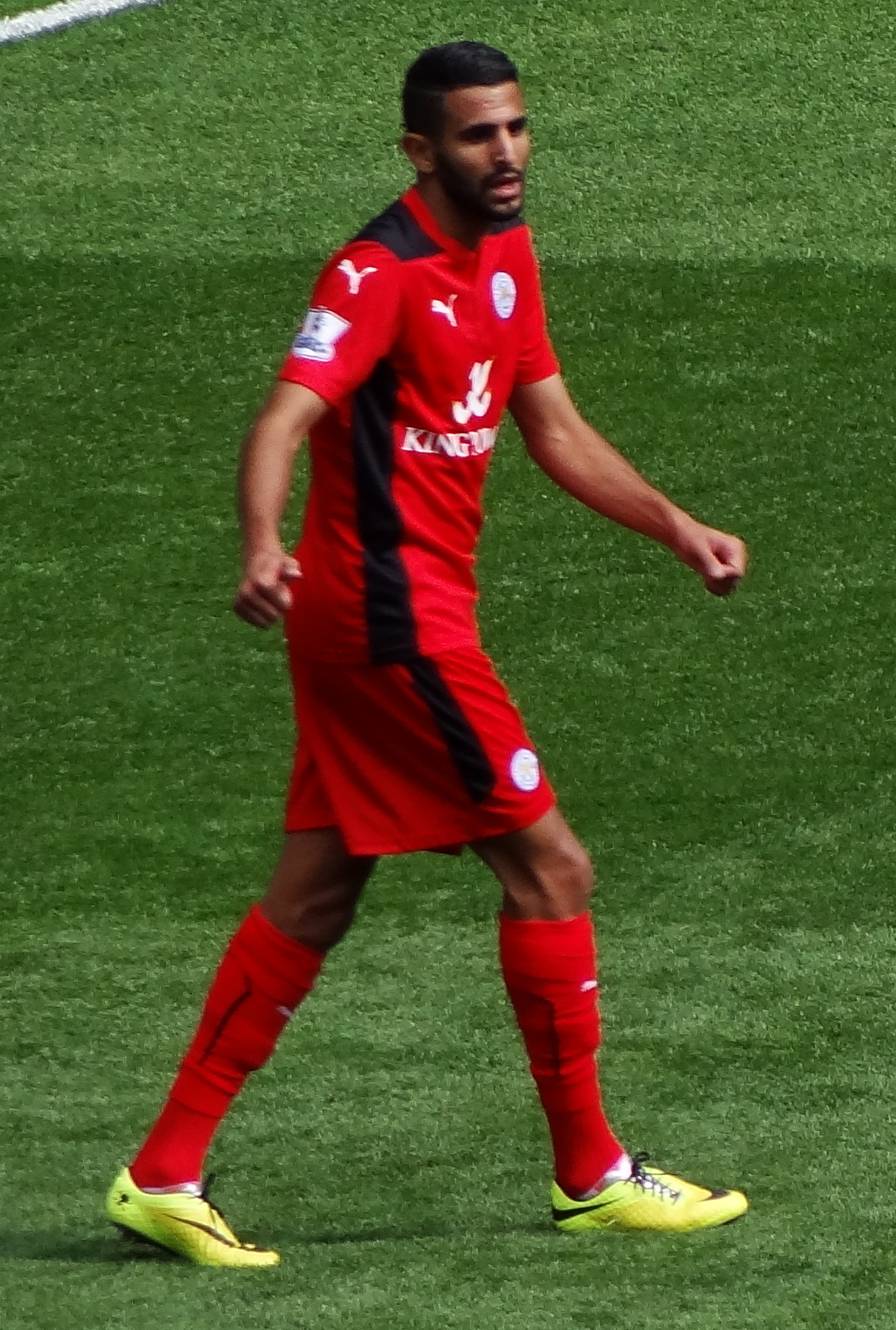
Riyad Mahrez was voted PFA Player of the Year after helping Leicester win the title in 2016

- Mehdi Abeid – Newcastle United – 2014–15
- **Rayan Aït-Nouri** – Wolverhampton Wanderers, **Manchester City** – 2020–
- Nadir Belhadj – Portsmouth – 2008–10
- **Mohamed Belloumi** – **Hull City** – 2026–
- Djamel Belmadi – Manchester City – 2002–03
- Ali Benarbia – Manchester City – 2002–03
- Saïd Benrahma – West Ham United – 2020–24
- Nabil Bentaleb – Tottenham Hotspur, Newcastle United – 2013–16, 2019–20
- Hamer Bouazza – Watford, Fulham – 2006–08
- Madjid Bougherra – Charlton Athletic – 2006–07
- Sofiane Feghouli – West Ham United – 2016–17
- Rachid Ghezzal – Leicester City – 2018–19
- Kamel Ghilas – Hull City – 2009–10
- Adlène Guedioura – Wolverhampton Wanderers, Crystal Palace, Watford, Middlesbrough – 2009–12, 2013–17
- **Jaouen Hadjam** – **Brighton & Hove Albion** – 2026–
- Rafik Halliche – Fulham – 2010–11
- Yasser Larouci – Sheffield United – 2023–24
- Riyad Mahrez (**284**) – Leicester City, Manchester City – 2014–23
- Moussa Saïb – Tottenham Hotspur – 1997–99
- Islam Slimani – Leicester City, Newcastle United – 2016–18, 2020–21
- Hassan Yebda – Portsmouth – 2009–10

=== Angola ===
- Manuel Benson – Burnley – 2023–24
- Hélder Costa (**48**) – Wolverhampton Wanderers, Leeds United – 2018–19, 2020–22
- Manucho – Manchester United, Hull City – 2008–09

=== Benin ===
- Rudy Gestede – Cardiff City, Aston Villa, Middlesbrough – 2013–14, 2015–17
- Steve Mounié – Huddersfield Town – 2017–19
- Stéphane Sessègnon (**166**) – Sunderland, West Bromwich Albion – 2010–16

=== Burkina Faso ===
- Nasser Djiga – Wolverhampton Wanderers – 2024–25
- Issa Kaboré – Luton Town – 2023–24
- **Dango Ouattara** (**118**) – Bournemouth, **Brentford** – 2022–
- **Bertrand Traoré** – Chelsea, Aston Villa, **Sunderland** – 2015–16, 2020–24, 2025–

=== Burundi ===
- Saido Berahino (**133**) – West Bromwich Albion, Stoke City – 2013–18
- Gaël Bigirimana – Newcastle United – 2012–13

=== Cameroon ===
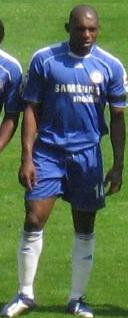
Geremi won two consecutive Premier League titles with Chelsea

- Benoît Assou-Ekotto – Tottenham Hotspur – 2006–13
- Timothée Atouba – Tottenham Hotspur – 2004–05
- **Carlos Baleba** – Brighton & Hove Albion, **Manchester United** – 2023–
- Sébastien Bassong – Newcastle United, Tottenham Hotspur, Wolverhampton Wanderers, Norwich City – 2008–14, 2015–16
- André Bikey – Reading, Burnley – 2006–08, 2009–10
- Gaëtan Bong – Brighton & Hove Albion – 2017–20
- Eric Maxim Choupo-Moting – Stoke City – 2017–18
- Eric Djemba-Djemba – Manchester United, Aston Villa – 2003–07
- Roudolphe Douala – Portsmouth – 2006–07
- George Elokobi – Wolverhampton Wanderers – 2009–12
- Eyong Enoh – Fulham – 2012–13
- Samuel Eto'o – Chelsea, Everton – 2013–15
- Marc-Vivien Foé – West Ham United, Manchester City – 1998–2000, 2002–03
- Geremi – Middlesbrough, Chelsea, Newcastle United – 2002–09
- Joseph-Désiré Job – Middlesbrough – 2000–06
- Lauren – Arsenal, Portsmouth – 2000–08
- Jean Makoun – Aston Villa – 2010–11
- Joël Matip – Liverpool – 2016–24
- **Bryan Mbeumo** – Brentford, **Manchester United** – 2021–
- Stéphane Mbia – Queens Park Rangers – 2012–13
- Patrick M'Boma – Sunderland – 2001–02
- Lucien Mettomo – Manchester City – 2002–03
- Valéry Mézague – Portsmouth – 2004–05
- Clinton N'Jie – Tottenham Hotspur – 2015–16
- Georges-Kévin Nkoudou – Tottenham Hotspur, Burnley – 2016–20
- Nicolas Nkoulou – Watford – 2021–22
- Allan Nyom – Watford, West Bromwich Albion – 2015–18
- Salomon Olembé – Leeds United, Wigan Athletic – 2003–04, 2007–08
- André Onana – Manchester United – 2023–25
- Alex Song (**190**) – Charlton Athletic, Arsenal, West Ham United – 2005–12, 2014–16
- Rigobert Song – Liverpool, West Ham United – 1998–2002
- Franck Songo'o – Portsmouth – 2005–06, 2007–08
- Jackson Tchatchoua – Wolverhampton Wanderers – 2025–26
- Somen Tchoyi – West Bromwich Albion – 2010–12
- Pierre Womé – Fulham – 2002–03
- André-Frank Zambo Anguissa – Fulham – 2018–19, 2020–21

=== Cape Verde ===
- Bebé – Manchester United – 2010–11
- Cabral – Sunderland – 2013–14
- Pelé (**3**) – West Bromwich Albion – 2008–09

=== Central African Republic ===
- Frédéric Nimani (**2**) – Burnley – 2009–10

=== Congo (Republic of the Congo) ===
- Lucien Aubey – Portsmouth – 2007–08
- Christian Bassila – West Ham United, Sunderland – 2000–01, 2005–06
- Thievy Bifouma – West Bromwich Albion – 2013–14
- Amine Linganzi – Blackburn Rovers – 2009–11
- Christopher Samba (**171**) – Blackburn Rovers, Queens Park Rangers – 2006–13

=== DR Congo (Democratic Republic of the Congo) ===
- Benik Afobe – Bournemouth – 2015–18
- **Jules Ahoka** – **Sunderland** – 2026–
- Beni Baningime – Everton – 2017–18
- Yannick Bolasie – Crystal Palace, Everton – 2013–18
- Grady Diangana – West Ham United, West Bromwich Albion – 2018–19, 2020–21
- Hérita Ilunga – West Ham United – 2008–11
- Giannelli Imbula – Stoke City – 2015–17
- Elias Kachunga – Huddersfield Town – 2017–19
- Gaël Kakuta – Chelsea, Fulham, Bolton Wanderers – 2009–12
- Willy Kambwala – Manchester United – 2023–24
- Edo Kayembe – Watford – 2021–22
- Neeskens Kebano – Fulham – 2018–19, 2020–21, 2022–23
- Kazenga LuaLua – Newcastle United – 2007–09, 2010–11
- Lomana LuaLua – Newcastle United, Portsmouth – 2000–07
- Arthur Masuaku – West Ham United, Sunderland – 2016–22, 2025–26
- Stephy Mavididi – Leicester City – 2024–25
- Chancel Mbemba – Newcastle United – 2015–16, 2017–18
- Dieumerci Mbokani – Norwich City, Hull City – 2015–17
- Pelly Ruddock Mpanzu – Luton Town – 2023–24
- Youssouf Mulumbu – West Bromwich Albion, Norwich City – 2008–09, 2010–16
- Arnold Mvuemba – Portsmouth – 2006–09
- Michel Ngonge – Watford – 1999–2000
- Shabani Nonda – Blackburn Rovers – 2006–07
- **Noah Sadiki** – **Sunderland** – 2025–
- Axel Tuanzebe – Manchester United, Aston Villa, Ipswich Town, Burnley – 2016–18, 2019–22, 2024–26
- **Aaron Wan-Bissaka** (**237**) – Crystal Palace, Manchester United, West Ham United, **Aston Villa** – 2017–
- **Yoane Wissa** – Brentford, **Newcastle United** – 2021–

=== Egypt ===
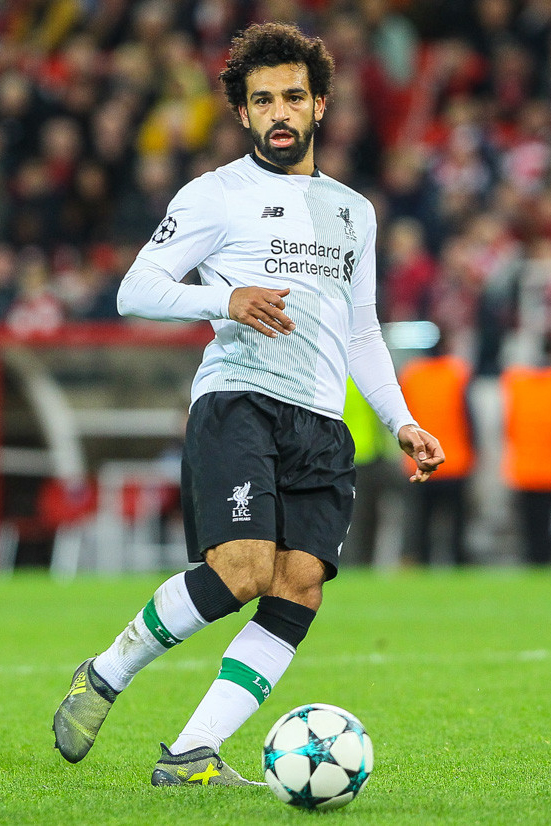
In 2017–18, Mohamed Salah won the PFA Players' Player of the Year and was the top scorer with a record breaking 32 goals

- Ahmed Elmohamady – Sunderland, Hull City, Aston Villa – 2010–15, 2016–17, 2019–21
- Mohamed Elneny – Arsenal – 2015–19, 2020–24
- Ahmed Fathy – Sheffield United – 2006–07
- Gedo – Hull City – 2013–14
- Hossam Ghaly – Tottenham Hotspur, Derby County – 2006–08
- Ahmed Hegazi – West Bromwich Albion – 2017–18, 2020–21
- **Omar Marmoush** – Manchester City, **Tottenham Hotspur** – 2024–
- Mido – Tottenham Hotspur, Middlesbrough, Wigan Athletic, West Ham United – 2004–10
- Sam Morsy – Ipswich Town – 2024–25
- Mohamed Salah (**328**) – Chelsea, Liverpool – 2013–15, 2017–26
- Mohamed Shawky – Middlesbrough – 2007–09
- Ramadan Sobhi – Stoke City, Huddersfield Town – 2016–19
- Trézéguet – Aston Villa – 2019–22
- Amr Zaki – Wigan Athletic, Hull City – 2008–10

=== Equatorial Guinea ===
- Emilio Nsue – Middlesbrough – 2016–17
- Pedro Obiang (**91**) – West Ham United – 2015–19

=== Gabon ===
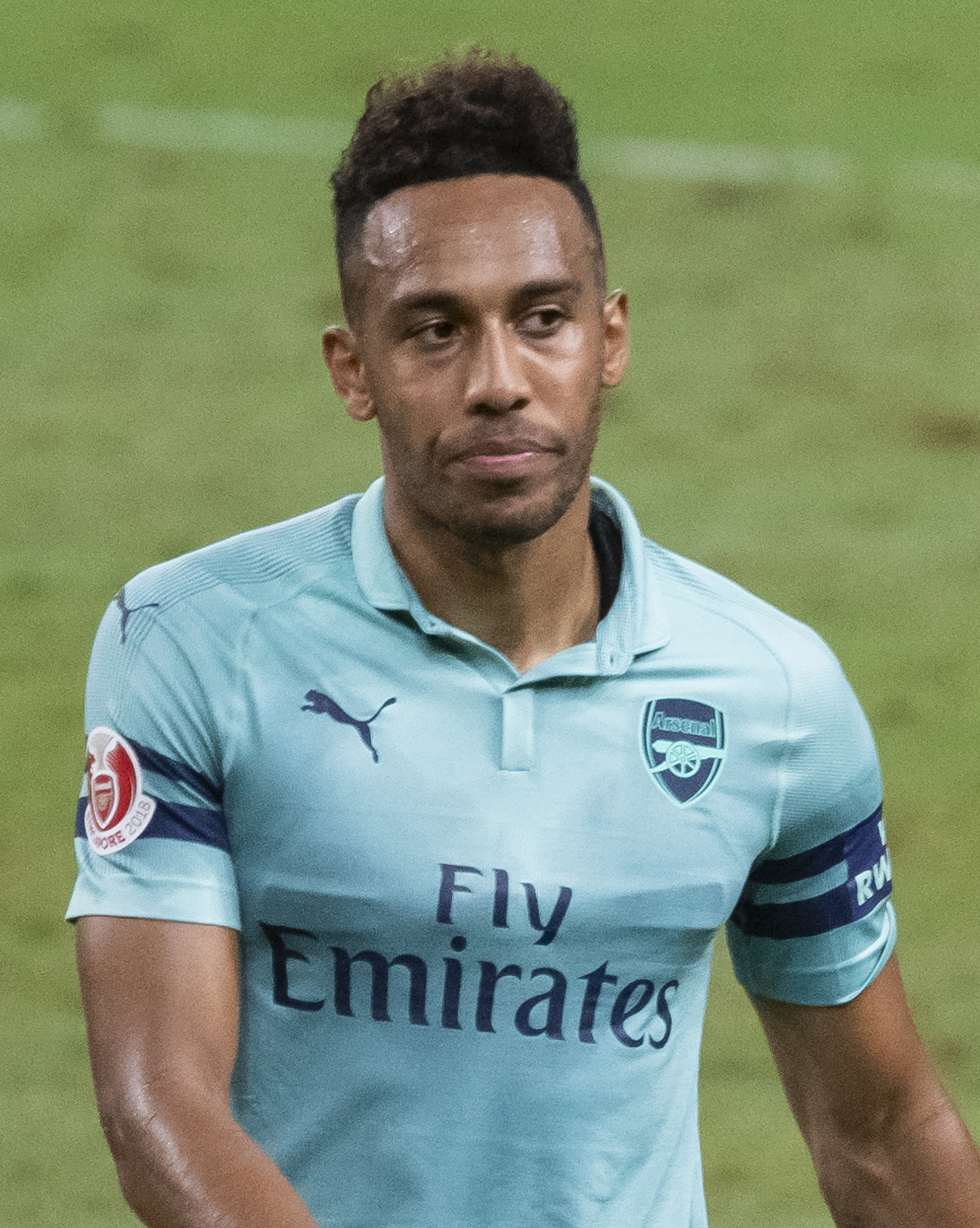
Pierre-Emerick Aubameyang was the joint-top goalscorer in the Premier League in 2018–19, scoring 22 goals for Arsenal

- Pierre-Emerick Aubameyang – Arsenal, Chelsea – 2017–23
- Daniel Cousin – Hull City – 2008–10
- Bruno Ecuele Manga – Cardiff City – 2018–19
- Mario Lemina (**145**) – Southampton, Fulham, Wolverhampton Wanderers – 2017–19, 2020–21, 2022–25
- Didier Ndong – Sunderland – 2016–17

=== Gambia (The Gambia) ===
- Modou Barrow – Swansea City – 2014–17
- **Yankuba Minteh** (**66**) – **Brighton & Hove Albion** – 2024–

=== Ghana ===
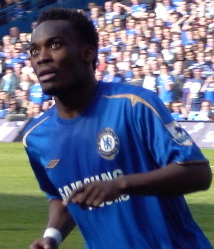
Michael Essien won the Premier League twice with Chelsea

- Albert Adomah – Middlesbrough – 2016–17
- Junior Agogo – Sheffield Wednesday – 1997–99
- Dan Agyei – Burnley – 2016–17
- Patrick Agyemang – Queens Park Rangers – 2011–12
- Daniel Amartey – Leicester City – 2015–19, 2020–23
- Christian Atsu – Everton, Newcastle United – 2014–15, 2017–20
- André Ayew – Swansea City, West Ham United, Nottingham Forest – 2015–18, 2022–23
- Jordan Ayew (**305**) – Aston Villa, Swansea City, Crystal Palace, Leicester City – 2015–25
- Derek Boateng – Fulham – 2013–14
- Kevin-Prince Boateng – Tottenham Hotspur, Portsmouth – 2007–10
- Malik Buari – Fulham – 2003–04
- Joe Dodoo – Leicester City – 2015–16
- Michael Essien – Chelsea – 2005–12, 2013–14
- **Abdul Fatawu** – Leicester City, **Ipswich Town** – 2024–25, 2026–
- Tariqe Fosu – Brentford – 2021–22
- Emmanuel Frimpong – Arsenal, Wolverhampton Wanderers, Fulham – 2011–13
- Asamoah Gyan – Sunderland – 2010–12
- Elvis Hammond – Fulham – 2002–03, 2004–05
- Richard Kingson – Birmingham City, Wigan Athletic, Blackpool – 2007–09, 2010–11
- **Mohammed Kudus** – West Ham United, **Tottenham Hotspur** – 2023–
- Nii Lamptey – Aston Villa, Coventry City – 1994–96
- Tariq Lamptey – Chelsea, Brighton & Hove Albion – 2019–25
- John Mensah – Sunderland – 2009–11
- Sulley Muntari – Portsmouth, Sunderland – 2007–08, 2010–11
- Alex Nyarko – Everton – 2000–01, 2003–04
- Denis Odoi – Fulham – 2018–19, 2020–21
- **Ibrahim Osman** – **Brighton & Hove Albion** – 2026–
- Quincy Owusu-Abeyie – Arsenal, Portsmouth – 2004–06, 2009–10
- John Paintsil – West Ham United, Fulham – 2006–11
- Thomas Partey – Arsenal – 2020–25
- Baba Rahman – Chelsea – 2015–16
- Jesurun Rak-Sakyi – Crystal Palace – 2021–22, 2023–24
- Mohammed Salisu – Southampton – 2020–23
- Lloyd Sam – Charlton Athletic – 2004–07
- Jeffrey Schlupp – Leicester City, Crystal Palace – 2014–25
- **Antoine Semenyo** – Bournemouth, **Manchester City** – 2022–
- Kamaldeen Sulemana – Southampton – 2022–23, 2024–25
- **Brandon Thomas-Asante** – **Coventry City** – 2026–
- Tony Yeboah – Leeds United – 1994–97
- **Caleb Yirenkyi** – **Coventry City** – 2026–

=== Guinea ===
- Mo Camara – Derby County – 2007–08
- Titi Camara – Liverpool, West Ham United – 1999–2003
- **Sidiki Cherif** – **Coventry City** – 2026–
- Ibrahima Cissé – Fulham – 2018–19
- Kaba Diawara – Arsenal, West Ham United – 1998–99, 2000–01
- Naby Keïta (**84**) – Liverpool – 2018–23
- Kamil Zayatte – Hull City – 2008–10

=== Guinea-Bissau ===
- **Beto** (**99**) – **Everton** – 2023–
- Mesca – Fulham – 2013–14

=== Ivory Coast ===
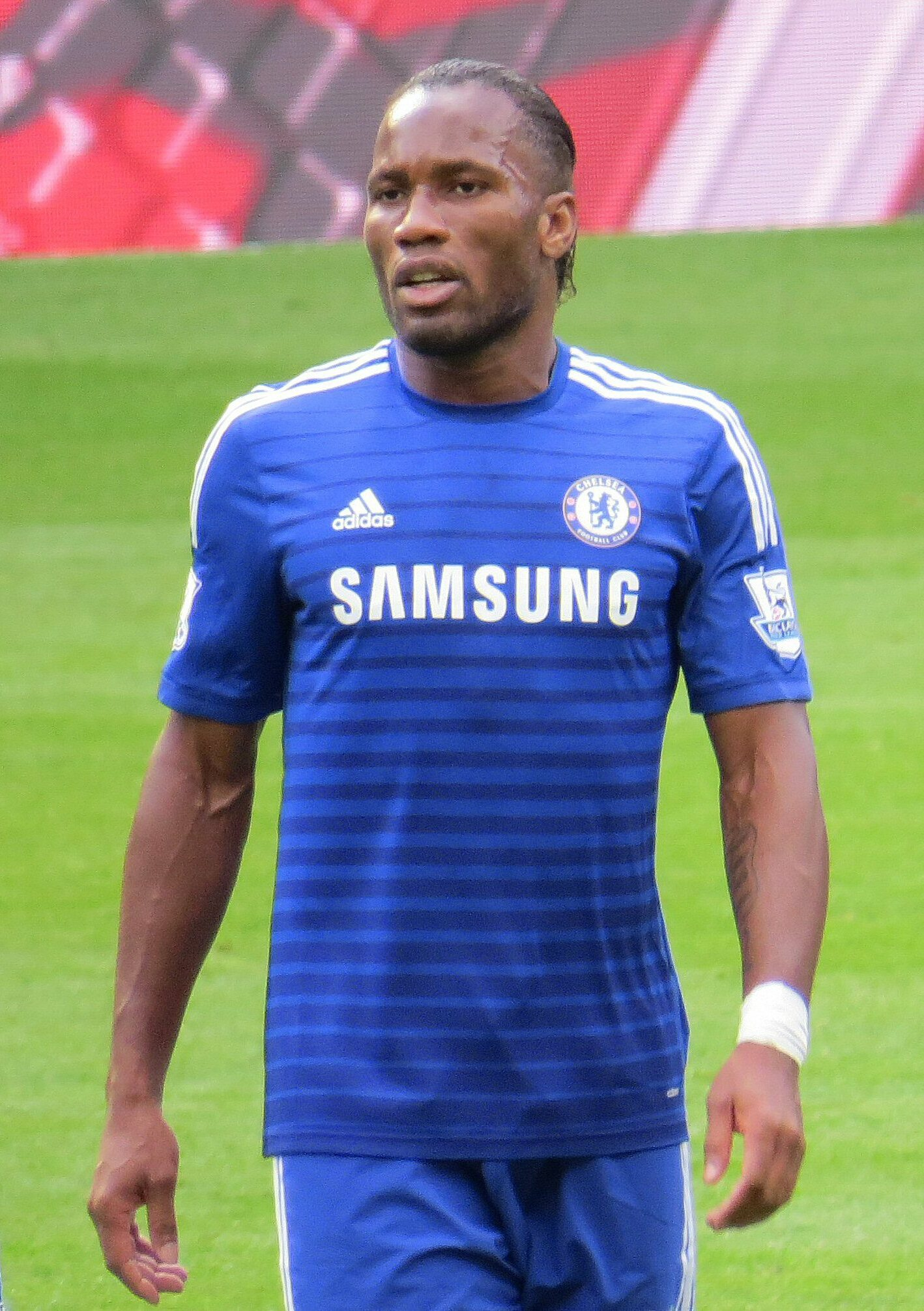
Didier Drogba scored 104 Premier League goals and won four league titles with Chelsea

- Simon Adingra – Brighton & Hove Albion, Sunderland – 2023–26
- Emmanuel Agbadou – Wolverhampton Wanderers – 2024–26
- Serge Aurier – Tottenham Hotspur, Nottingham Forest – 2017–21, 2022–24
- Eric Bailly – Manchester United – 2016–22
- Ibrahima Bakayoko – Everton – 1998–99
- Sol Bamba – Cardiff City – 2018–19
- Jérémie Boga – Chelsea – 2017–18
- Willy Boly –Wolverhampton Wanderers, Nottingham Forest – 2018–25
- Wilfried Bony – Swansea City, Manchester City, Stoke City – 2013–18
- Maxwel Cornet – Burnley, West Ham United, Southampton – 2021–25
- Siriki Dembélé – Bournemouth – 2022–23
- Guy Demel – West Ham United – 2011–15
- **Amad Diallo** – **Manchester United** – 2020–21, 2023–
- Aruna Dindane – Portsmouth – 2009–10
- **Ousmane Diomande** – **Nottingham Forest** – 2026–
- Seydou Doumbia – Newcastle United – 2015–16
- Didier Drogba – Chelsea – 2004–12, 2014–15
- Emmanuel Eboué – Arsenal – 2004–11
- Emerse Faé – Reading – 2007–08
- David Datro Fofana – Chelsea, Burnley – 2022–24
- Jean-Philippe Gbamin – Everton – 2019–22
- **Yann Gboho** – **Coventry City** – 2026–
- Gervinho – Arsenal – 2011–13
- Martial Godo – Fulham – 2024–25
- Steve Gohouri – Wigan Athletic – 2009–12
- Max Gradel – Bournemouth – 2015–17
- **Evann Guessand** – Aston Villa, **Crystal Palace** – 2025–
- Sébastien Haller – West Ham United – 2019–21
- Salomon Kalou – Chelsea – 2006–12
- Hassane Kamara – Watford – 2021–22
- Jonathan Kodjia – Aston Villa – 2019–20
- Arouna Koné – Wigan Athletic, Everton – 2012–17
- Lamine Koné – Sunderland – 2015–17
- Abdoulaye Méïté – Bolton Wanderers, West Bromwich Albion – 2006–09, 2010–11
- **Abdoul Ouattara** – **Ipswich Town** – 2026–
- Nicolas Pépé – Arsenal – 2019–22
- Abdul Razak – Manchester City – 2010–13
- Yannick Sagbo – Hull City – 2013–15
- **Ibrahim Sangaré** – **Nottingham Forest** – 2023–
- Jean Michaël Seri – Fulham – 2018–19
- **Jocelin Ta Bi** – **Sunderland** – 2025–
- Olivier Tébily – Birmingham City – 2002–06
- Cheick Tioté – Newcastle United – 2010–16
- **Bazoumana Touré** – **Newcastle United** – 2026–
- Kolo Touré (**353**) – Arsenal, Manchester City, Liverpool – 2002–16
- Yaya Touré – Manchester City – 2010–18
- Bénie Traoré – Sheffield United – 2023–24
- Hamed Traorè – Bournemouth – 2022–24, 2025–26
- Lacina Traoré – Everton – 2013–14
- **Malick Yalcouyé** – **Brighton & Hove Albion** – 2026–
- Wilfried Zaha – Manchester United, Cardiff City, Crystal Palace – 2013–23
- Didier Zokora – Tottenham Hotspur – 2006–09

=== Kenya ===
- Victor Wanyama (**154**) – Southampton, Tottenham Hotspur – 2013–20

=== Liberia ===
- Alex Nimely – Manchester City – 2009–10
- George Weah – Chelsea, Manchester City – 1999–2001
- Christopher Wreh (**28**) – Arsenal – 1997–99

=== Mali ===
- Yves Bissouma – Brighton & Hove Albion, Tottenham Hotspur – 2018–26
- Kalifa Cissé – Reading – 2007–08
- Woyo Coulibaly – Leicester City – 2024–25
- Fousseni Diabaté – Leicester City – 2017–19
- Samba Diakité – Queens Park Rangers – 2011–13
- Mahamadou Diarra – Fulham – 2011–13
- Moussa Djenepo – Southampton – 2019–23
- Abdoulaye Doucouré (**278**) – Watford, Everton – 2016–25
- Cheick Doucouré – Crystal Palace – 2022–25
- Massadio Haïdara – Newcastle United – 2012–16, 2017–18
- Frédéric Kanouté – West Ham United, Tottenham Hotspur – 1999–2006
- Mohamadou Kanté - West Ham United – 2025–26
- Jimmy Kébé – Reading, Crystal Palace – 2007–08, 2012–14
- Modibo Maïga – West Ham United – 2012–15
- Bakary Sako – Crystal Palace – 2015–19
- **Mamadou Sangaré** – **Brentford** – 2026–
- Mamady Sidibé – Stoke City – 2008–11
- Mohamed Sissoko – Liverpool – 2005–08
- Yacouba Sylla – Aston Villa – 2012–14
- Boubacar Traoré – Wolverhampton Wanderers – 2022–25
- Djimi Traoré – Liverpool, Charlton Athletic, Portsmouth – 2000–01, 2002–08
- Molla Wagué – Watford – 2017–18

=== Mauritania ===
- El Hadji Ba – Sunderland – 2013–14
- Aboubakar Kamara (**24**) – Fulham – 2018–19, 2020–21

=== Morocco ===
- **Amine Adli** – **Bournemouth** – 2025–
- Nayef Aguerd – West Ham United – 2022–24, 2025–26
- Nordin Amrabat – Watford – 2015–18
- Sofyan Amrabat – Manchester United – 2023–24
- Oussama Assaidi – Liverpool, Stoke City – 2012–15
- **Ayyoub Bouaddi** – **Manchester City** – 2026–
- Sofiane Boufal – Southampton – 2016–18, 2019–20
- Marouane Chamakh – Arsenal, West Ham United, Crystal Palace – 2010–16
- Youssef Chippo – Coventry City – 1999–2001
- Manuel da Costa – West Ham United – 2009–11
- Brahim Díaz – Manchester City – 2017–18
- **Issa Diop** (**178**) – West Ham United, Fulham, **Ipswich Town** – 2018–
- Karim El Ahmadi – Aston Villa – 2012–14
- Talal El Karkouri – Sunderland, Charlton Athletic – 2002–03, 2004–07
- Tahar El Khalej – Southampton, Charlton Athletic – 1999–2003
- Bilal El Khannouss – Leicester City – 2024–25
- Nabil El Zhar – Liverpool – 2006–07, 2008–10
- Mustapha Hadji – Coventry City, Aston Villa – 1999–2004
- Hassan Kachloul – Southampton, Aston Villa, Wolverhampton Wanderers – 1998–2002, 2003–04
- Imrân Louza – Watford – 2021–22
- Adam Masina – Watford – 2018–20, 2021–22
- **Noussair Mazraoui** – **Manchester United** – 2024–
- Noureddine Naybet – Tottenham Hotspur – 2004–06
- Abdeslam Ouaddou – Fulham – 2001–03
- **Chadi Riad** – **Crystal Palace** – 2024–
- Abdelhamid Sabiri – Huddersfield Town – 2017–19
- Youssef Safri – Norwich City – 2004–05
- Romain Saïss – Wolverhampton Wanderers – 2018–22
- Adel Taarabt – Tottenham Hotspur, Queens Park Rangers, Fulham – 2006–09, 2011–15
- **Chemsdine Talbi** – **Sunderland** – 2025–
- Anass Zaroury – Burnley – 2023–24
- Hakim Ziyech – Chelsea – 2020–23

=== Mozambique ===
- **Reinildo Mandava** (**29**) – **Sunderland** – 2025–

=== Nigeria ===
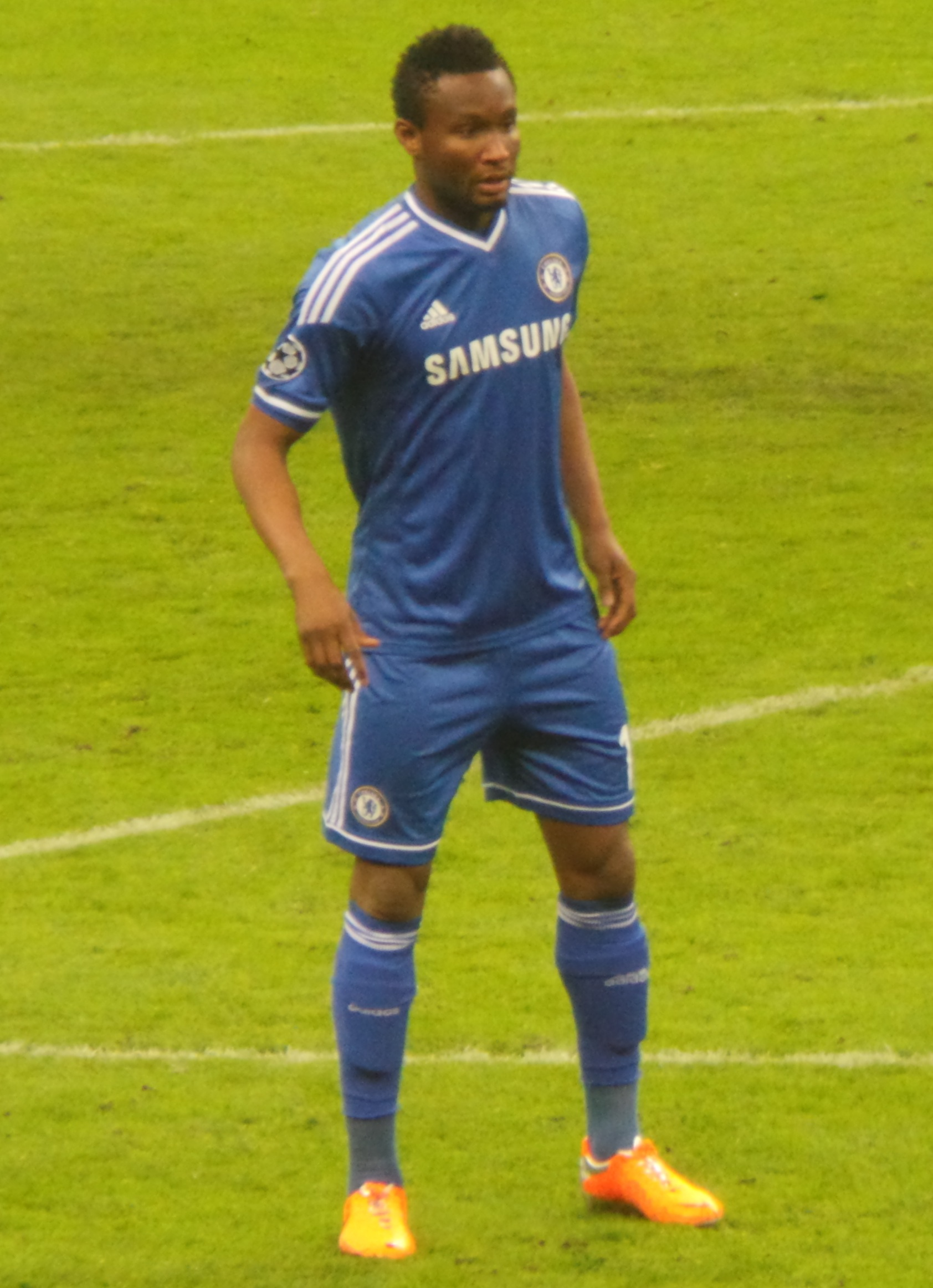
Mikel John Obi won two Premier League titles for Chelsea

- Julius Aghahowa – Wigan Athletic – 2006–08
- **Ola Aina** – Chelsea, Fulham, **Nottingham Forest** – 2016–17, 2020–21, 2023–
- **Semi Ajayi** – West Bromwich Albion, **Hull City** – 2020–21, 2026–
- Ade Akinbiyi – Norwich City, Leicester City, Sheffield United – 1993–95, 2000–02, 2006–07
- Hope Akpan – Reading – 2012–13
- Chuba Akpom – Arsenal – 2013–15
- Sammy Ameobi – Newcastle United – 2010–15
- Shola Ameobi – Newcastle United, Crystal Palace – 2000–09, 2010–15
- Daniel Amokachi – Everton – 1994–96
- Victor Anichebe – Everton, West Bromwich Albion, Sunderland – 2005–17
- Sone Aluko – Hull City – 2013–15
- Joe Aribo – Southampton – 2022–23, 2024–25
- Tolu Arokodare – Wolverhampton Wanderers – 2025–26
- **Taiwo Awoniyi** – Nottingham Forest, **Coventry City** – 2022–
- Celestine Babayaro – Chelsea, Newcastle United – 1997–2007
- Leon Balogun – Brighton & Hove Albion – 2018–19
- **Calvin Bassey** – **Fulham** – 2023–
- **Samuel Chukwueze** – **Fulham** – 2025–
- Emmanuel Dennis – Watford, Nottingham Forest – 2021–23
- Efan Ekoku – Norwich City, Wimbledon – 1992–99
- Emmanuel Emenike – West Ham United – 2015–16
- Peter Etebo – Watford – 2021–22
- Dickson Etuhu – Sunderland, Fulham – 2007–12
- Kelvin Etuhu – Manchester City – 2007–09
- Finidi George – Ipswich Town – 2001–02
- Brown Ideye – West Bromwich Albion – 2014–15
- Odion Ighalo – Watford, Manchester United – 2015–17, 2019–21
- Kelechi Iheanacho – Manchester City, Leicester City – 2015–23
- Carl Ikeme – Wolverhampton Wanderers – 2011–12
- **Alex Iwobi** (**325**) – Arsenal, Everton, **Fulham** – 2015–
- Samuel Kalu – Watford – 2021–22
- Blessing Kaku – Bolton Wanderers – 2004–05
- Nwankwo Kanu – Arsenal, West Bromwich Albion, Portsmouth – 1998–2010
- Freddie Ladapo – Crystal Palace – 2017–18
- Ademola Lookman – Everton, Fulham, Leicester City 2016–19, 2020–22
- Josh Maja – Fulham – 2020–21
- Obafemi Martins – Newcastle United, Birmingham City – 2006–09, 2010–11
- John Obi Mikel – Chelsea – 2006–16
- Victor Moses – Wigan Athletic, Chelsea, Liverpool, Stoke City, West Ham United – 2009–19
- Ahmed Musa – Leicester City – 2016–17
- George Ndah – Crystal Palace – 1992–95
- Wilfred Ndidi – Leicester City – 2016–23, 2024–25
- Victor Obinna – West Ham United – 2010–11
- Peter Odemwingie – West Bromwich Albion, Cardiff City, Stoke City – 2010–16
- Jay-Jay Okocha – Bolton Wanderers – 2002–06
- Isaac Okoronkwo – Wolverhampton Wanderers – 2003–04
- Seyi Olofinjana – Stoke City, Hull City – 2008–10
- Emmanuel Omoyinmi – West Ham United – 1997–99
- Paul Onuachu – Southampton – 2022–23, 2024–25
- Fred Onyedinma – Luton Town – 2023–24
- **Frank Onyeka** – Brentford, **Coventry City** – 2021–
- Gabriel Osho – Luton Town – 2023–24
- Danny Shittu – Watford, Bolton Wanderers – 2006–07, 2008–09
- Sam Sodje – Reading – 2006–07
- Isaac Success – Watford – 2016–17, 2018–20
- Taye Taiwo – Queens Park Rangers – 2011–12
- Nathan Tella – Southampton – 2020–22
- William Troost-Ekong – Watford – 2021–22
- Christantus Uche – Crystal Palace – 2025–26
- Ifeanyi Udeze – West Bromwich Albion – 2002–03
- John Utaka – Portsmouth – 2007–10
- Taribo West – Derby County – 2000–01
- Yakubu – Portsmouth, Middlesbrough, Everton, Blackburn Rovers – 2003–12
- Joseph Yobo – Everton, Norwich City – 2002–10, 2013–14
- **Zadok Yohanna** – **Brighton & Hove Albion** – 2026–

=== Senegal ===
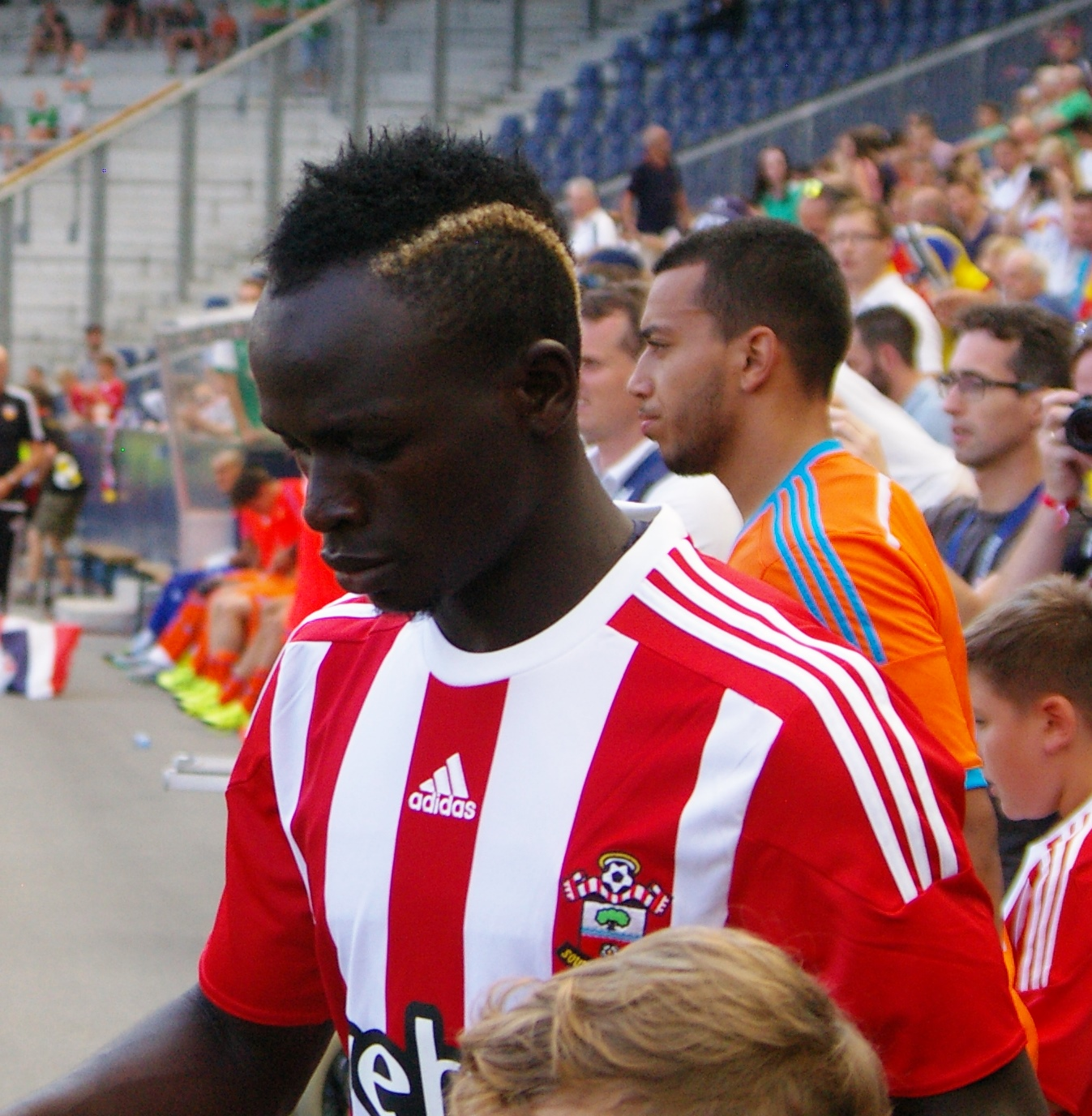
Sadio Mané scored the quickest Premier League hat-trick, netting three goals in 176 seconds

- Demba Ba – West Ham United, Newcastle United, Chelsea – 2010–14
- Fodé Ballo-Touré – Fulham – 2023–24
- Habib Beye – Newcastle United, Aston Villa – 2007–11
- Henri Camara – Wolverhampton Wanderers, Southampton, Wigan Athletic, West Ham United, Stoke City – 2003–09
- Aliou Cissé – Birmingham City, Portsmouth – 2002–06
- Papiss Cissé – Newcastle United – 2011–16
- Ferdinand Coly – Birmingham City – 2002–03
- Ali Dia – Southampton – 1996–97
- Mbaye Diagne – West Bromwich Albion – 2020–21
- Mohamed Diamé – Wigan Athletic, West Ham United, Hull City, Newcastle United – 2009–15, 2017–19
- Salif Diao – Liverpool, Birmingham City, Portsmouth, Stoke City – 2002–06, 2008–12
- **Habib Diarra** – **Sunderland** – 2025–
- Lamine Diatta – Newcastle United – 2007–08
- Djibril Diawara – Bolton Wanderers – 2001–02
- Souleymane Diawara – Charlton Athletic – 2006–07
- Papa Bouba Diop – Fulham, Portsmouth – 2004–10
- El Hadji Diouf – Liverpool, Bolton Wanderers, Sunderland, Blackburn Rovers – 2002–11
- **El Hadji Malick Diouf** – West Ham United, **Brentford** – 2025–
- Mame Biram Diouf – Manchester United, Blackburn Rovers, Stoke City – 2009–11, 2014–18
- Papy Djilobodji – Sunderland – 2016–17
- Khalilou Fadiga – Bolton Wanderers – 2004–06
- Abdoulaye Faye – Bolton Wanderers, Newcastle United, Stoke City, Hull City – 2005–11, 2013–14
- Amdy Faye – Portsmouth, Newcastle United, Charlton Athletic, Stoke City – 2003–07, 2008–09
- Idrissa Gueye – Aston Villa, Everton – 2015–19, 2022–26
- Magaye Gueye – Everton – 2010–14
- **Nicolas Jackson** – Chelsea, **Aston Villa** – 2023–25, 2026–
- Diomansy Kamara – Portsmouth, West Bromwich Albion, Fulham – 2004–06, 2007–11
- Kalidou Koulibaly – Chelsea – 2022–23
- Cheikhou Kouyaté (**291**) – West Ham United, Crystal Palace, Nottingham Forest – 2014–24
- Sadio Mané – Southampton, Liverpool – 2014–22
- Kader Mangane – Sunderland – 2012–13
- **Ibrahim Mbaye** – **Aston Villa** – 2026–
- Édouard Mendy – Chelsea – 2020–23
- Nampalys Mendy – Leicester City – 2016–23
- **Nobel Mendy** – **Hull City** – 2026–
- Alfred N'Diaye – Sunderland, Hull City – 2012–13, 2016–17
- Badou Ndiaye – Stoke City – 2017–18
- **Iliman Ndiaye** – Sheffield United, Everton, **Manchester City** – 2020–21, 2024–
- Dame N'Doye – Hull City, Sunderland – 2014–16
- Moussa Niakhaté – Nottingham Forest – 2022–24
- M'Baye Niang – Watford – 2016–17
- Oumar Niasse – Everton, Hull City, Cardiff City – 2015–20
- Henri Saivet – Newcastle United – 2015–16, 2017–18
- Diafra Sakho – West Ham United – 2014–18
- Lamine Sakho – Leeds United – 2003–04
- **Ismaïla Sarr** – Watford, **Crystal Palace** – 2019–20, 2021–22, 2024–
- Malang Sarr – Chelsea – 2021–22
- Mamadou Sarr – Chelsea – 2025–26
- Pape Matar Sarr – Tottenham Hotspur – 2022–26
- Ibrahima Sonko – Reading, Stoke City, Hull City – 2006–10
- Pape Souaré – Crystal Palace – 2014–19
- Armand Traoré – Arsenal, Portsmouth, Queens Park Rangers – 2007–10, 2011–13, 2014–15

=== Seychelles ===
- Kevin Betsy – Fulham – 2001–02
- Michael Mancienne (**50**) – Chelsea, Wolverhampton Wanderers – 2008–11

=== Sierra Leone ===
- Al Bangura – Watford – 2006–07
- Steven Caulker – Swansea City, Tottenham Hotspur, Cardiff City, Queens Park Rangers, Southampton, Liverpool – 2011–16
- Curtis Davies (**139**) – West Bromwich Albion, Aston Villa, Birmingham City, Hull City – 2007–11, 2013–15, 2016–17
- Albert Jarrett – Watford – 2006–07
- Sullay Kaikai – Crystal Palace – 2015–18
- Kei Kamara – Norwich City – 2012–13

=== South Africa ===
- Shaun Bartlett – Charlton Athletic – 2000–06
- Kagisho Dikgacoi – Fulham, Crystal Palace – 2009–11, 2013–14
- Mark Fish – Bolton Wanderers, Charlton Athletic – 1997–98, 2000–05
- Quinton Fortune – Manchester United, Bolton Wanderers – 1999–2005, 2006–07
- Lyle Foster – Burnley – 2023–24, 2025–26
- Khanya Leshabela – Leicester City – 2020–21
- Mbulelo Mabizela – Tottenham Hotspur – 2003–05
- Phil Masinga – Leeds United – 1994–96
- Benni McCarthy – Blackburn Rovers, West Ham United – 2006–11
- Aaron Mokoena – Blackburn Rovers, Portsmouth – 2004–10
- Matty Pattison – Newcastle United – 2005–07
- Steven Pienaar (**214**) – Everton, Tottenham Hotspur, Sunderland – 2007–17
- Lucas Radebe – Leeds United – 1994–2001, 2002–04
- Tokelo Rantie – Bournemouth – 2015–16
- Percy Tau – Brighton & Hove Albion – 2020–21
- Eric Tinkler – Barnsley – 1997–98

=== Tanzania ===
- Mbwana Samatta (**14**) – Aston Villa – 2019–20

=== Togo ===
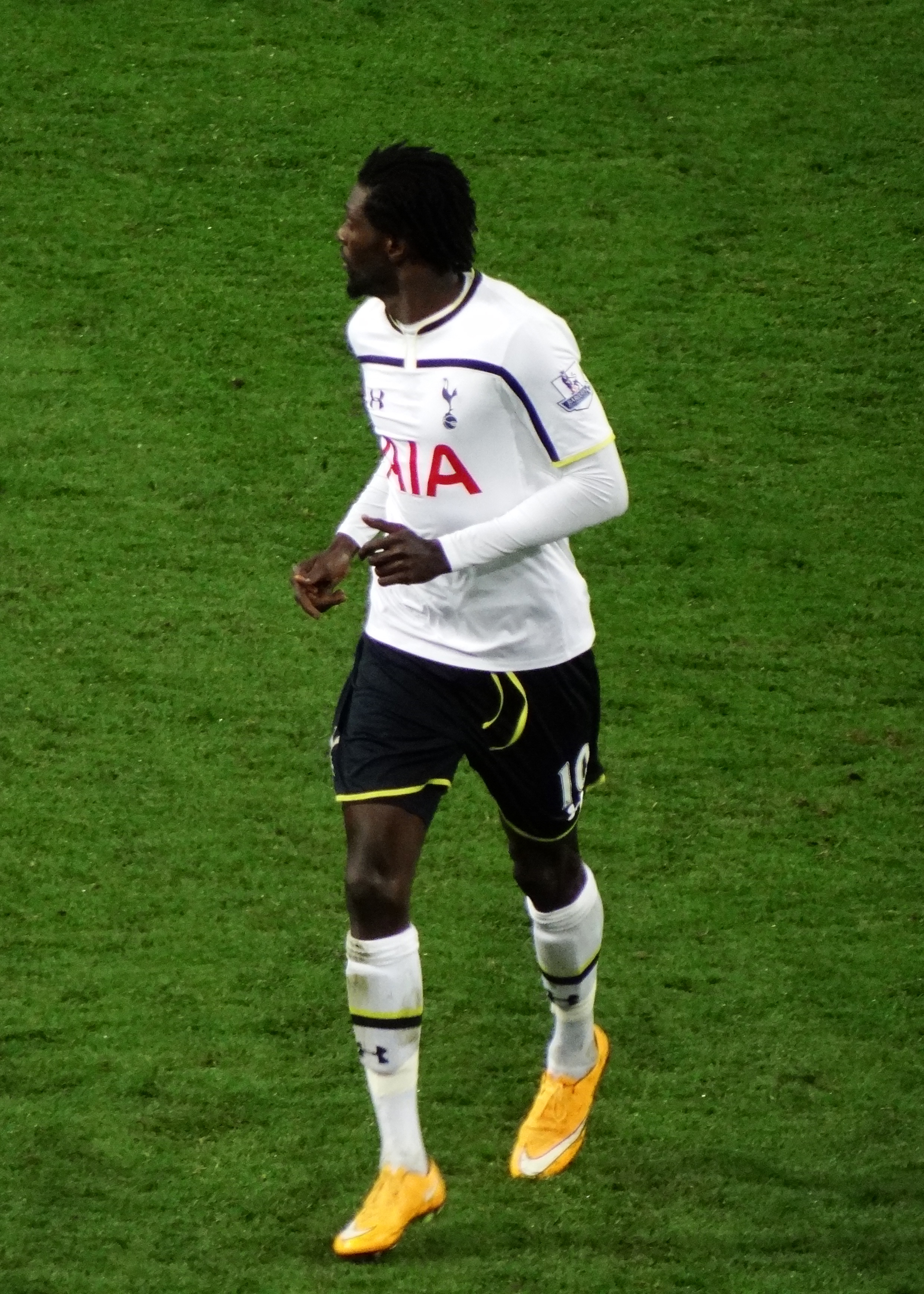
Emmanuel Adebayor played for four different Premier League clubs

- Emmanuel Adebayor (**242**) – Arsenal, Manchester City, Tottenham Hotspur, Crystal Palace – 2005–16
- Floyd Ayité – Fulham – 2018–19
- Yoann Folly – Southampton – 2003–05
- Moustapha Salifou – Aston Villa – 2007–08

=== Tunisia ===
- Anis Ben Slimane – Sheffield United – 2023–24
- Yohan Benalouane – Leicester City – 2015–18
- Radhi Jaïdi (**61**) – Bolton Wanderers, Birmingham City – 2004–06, 2007–08
- Wahbi Khazri – Sunderland – 2015–17
- Hannibal Mejbri – Manchester United, Burnley – 2020–22, 2023–24, 2025–26
- Mehdi Nafti – Birmingham City – 2004–06, 2007–08
- Hatem Trabelsi – Manchester City – 2006–07
- Yan Valery – Southampton – 2018–23

=== Zambia ===
- Patson Daka (**72**) – Leicester City – 2021–23, 2024–25
- Neil Gregory – Ipswich Town – 1994–95
- Emmanuel Mayuka – Southampton – 2012–13, 2014–15
- Collins Mbesuma – Portsmouth – 2005–06
- Enock Mwepu – Brighton & Hove Albion – 2021–23

=== Zimbabwe ===
- Benjani – Portsmouth, Manchester City, Sunderland, Blackburn Rovers – 2005–11
- Tawanda Chirewa – Wolverhampton Wanderers – 2023–24, 2025–26
- Brendan Galloway – Everton, West Bromwich Albion – 2014–17
- Bruce Grobbelaar – Liverpool, Southampton – 1992–96
- Marshall Munetsi – Wolverhampton Wanderers – 2024–26
- Marvelous Nakamba – Aston Villa, Luton Town – 2019–22, 2023–24
- Peter Ndlovu (**154**) – Coventry City – 1992–97
- Jordan Zemura – Bournemouth – 2022–23

== Asia (AFC) ==
=== Australia ===
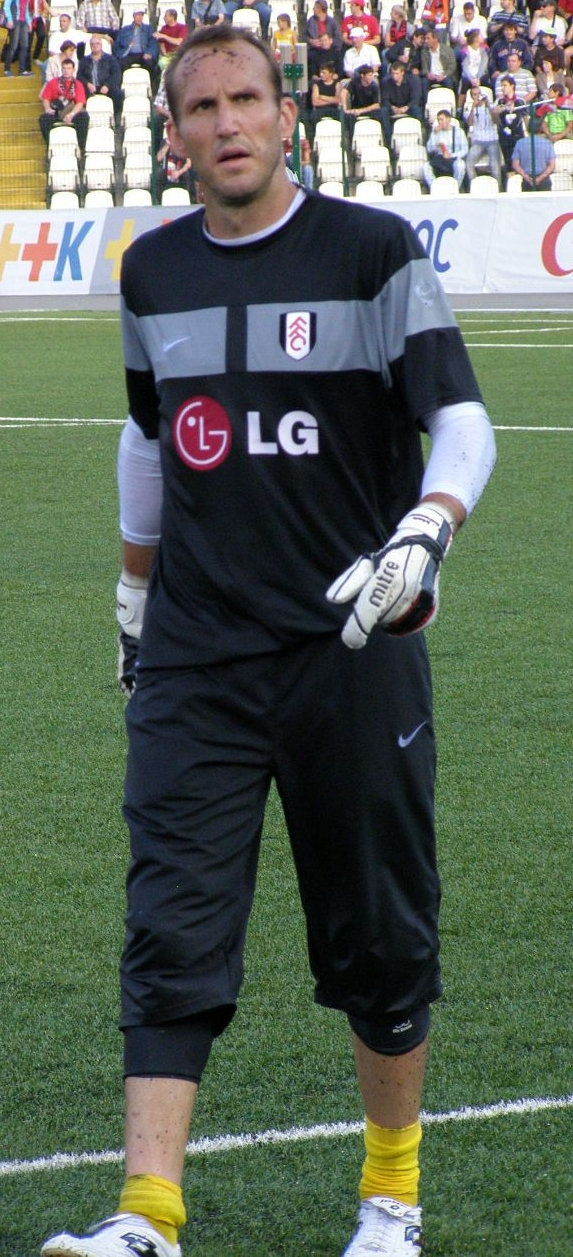
Mark Schwarzer is the only player from outside the United Kingdom to play over 500 Premier League matches

- Danny Allsopp – Manchester City – 2000–01
- John Aloisi – Coventry City – 1998–2001
- Con Blatsis – Derby County – 2000–01
- Mark Bosnich – Aston Villa, Manchester United, Chelsea – 1992–2000, 2001–02
- Vlado Bozinovski – Ipswich Town – 1992–93
- Cameron Burgess – Ipswich Town – 2024–25
- Jacob Burns – Leeds United – 2000–01, 2002–03
- Tim Cahill – Everton – 2004–12
- David Carney – Blackpool – 2010–11
- Chris Coyne – West Ham United – 1998–99
- Jason Davidson – West Bromwich Albion – 2014–15
- Ahmad Elrich – Fulham – 2005–06
- Brett Emerton – Blackburn Rovers – 2003–12
- Adam Federici – Reading, Bournemouth – 2006–07, 2012–13, 2015–17
- John Filan – Coventry City, Blackburn Rovers, Wigan Athletic – 1994–99, 2005–07
- Hayden Foxe – West Ham United, Portsmouth – 2000–02, 2003–04
- Tyrese Francois – Fulham – 2020–21, 2022–23
- Richard Garcia – West Ham United, Hull City – 2001–02, 2008–10
- Vince Grella – Blackburn Rovers – 2008–12
- Chris Herd – Aston Villa – 2010–14
- **Lucas Herrington** – **Hull City** – 2026–
- Brett Holman – Aston Villa – 2012–13
- Mile Jedinak – Crystal Palace – 2013–17
- Richard Johnson – Watford – 1999–2000
- Brad Jones – Middlesbrough, Liverpool – 2003–09, 2011–13, 2014–15
- Jason Kearton – Everton – 1992–93, 1994–95
- Harry Kewell – Leeds United, Liverpool – 1995–2008
- Neil Kilkenny – Birmingham City – 2005–06
- Stan Lazaridis – West Ham United, Birmingham City – 1995–99, 2002–06
- Massimo Luongo – Ipswich Town – 2024–25
- Jordan Lyden – Aston Villa – 2015–16
- Steve Mautone – West Ham United – 1996–97
- Scott McDonald – Southampton – 2001–02
- Jamie McMaster – Leeds United – 2002–03
- Craig Moore – Newcastle United – 2005–07
- Aaron Mooy – Huddersfield Town, Brighton & Hove Albion – 2017–20
- Kevin Muscat – Crystal Palace – 1997–98
- Lucas Neill – Blackburn Rovers, West Ham United, Everton – 2001–10
- Paul Okon – Middlesbrough, Leeds United – 2000–03
- Aiden O'Neill – Burnley – 2016–17
- Andy Petterson – Ipswich Town, Charlton Athletic – 1992–93, 1998–99
- Cameron Peupion – Brighton & Hove Albion – 2022–23
- Tony Popovic – Crystal Palace – 2004–05
- Adem Poric – Sheffield Wednesday – 1993–95, 1997–98
- Mathew Ryan – Brighton & Hove Albion, Arsenal – 2017–21
- Mark Schwarzer (**514**) – Middlesbrough, Fulham, Chelsea, Leicester City – 1996–97, 1998–2015
- Josip Skoko – Wigan Athletic – 2005–08
- Robbie Slater – Blackburn Rovers, West Ham United, Southampton – 1994–98
- Brad Smith – Liverpool, Bournemouth – 2013–14, 2015–17
- Harry Souttar – Leicester City – 2022–23
- Mile Sterjovski – Derby County – 2007–08
- Danny Tiatto – Manchester City – 2000–01, 2002–04
- Carl Veart – Crystal Palace – 1997–98
- Tony Vidmar – Middlesbrough – 2002–03
- Mark Viduka – Leeds United, Middlesbrough, Newcastle United – 2000–09
- Caleb Watts – Southampton – 2020–21
- Luke Wilkshire – Middlesbrough – 2001–03
- Ned Zelic – Queens Park Rangers – 1995–96

=== Bangladesh ===
- Hamza Choudhury (**57**) – Leicester City – 2017–22, 2024–25

=== China PR ===
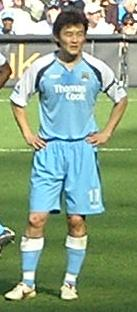
Sun Jihai is the first East Asian to score a Premier League goal when he scored for Manchester City in 2002

- Tyias Browning – Everton – 2014–16
- Dong Fangzhuo – Manchester United – 2006–07
- Li Tie – Everton – 2002–04
- Li Weifeng – Everton – 2002–03
- Sun Jihai (**130**) – Manchester City – 2002–08
- Nico Yennaris – Arsenal – 2011–12
- Zheng Zhi – Charlton Athletic – 2006–07

=== Indonesia ===
- Jordi Amat (**52**) – Swansea City – 2013–17

=== Iran ===
- Karim Bagheri – Charlton Athletic – 2000–01
- Ashkan Dejagah – Fulham – 2012–14
- Saman Ghoddos (**51**) – Brentford – 2021–24
- Alireza Jahanbakhsh – Brighton & Hove Albion – 2018–21
- Andranik Teymourian – Bolton Wanderers, Fulham – 2006–09

=== Iraq ===
- Ali Al-Hamadi (**11**) – Ipswich Town – 2024–25

=== Japan ===
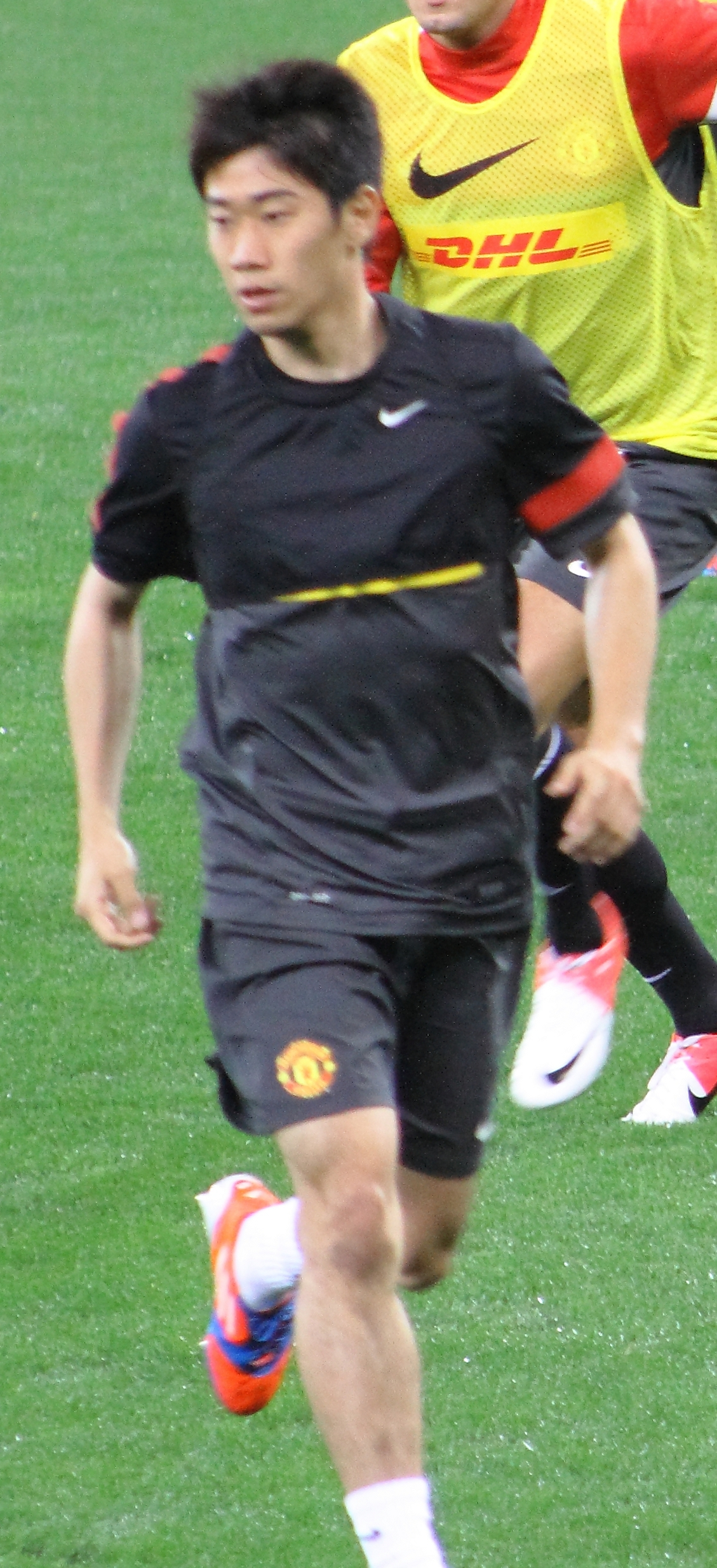
Shinji Kagawa won a Premier League title with Manchester United in 2013

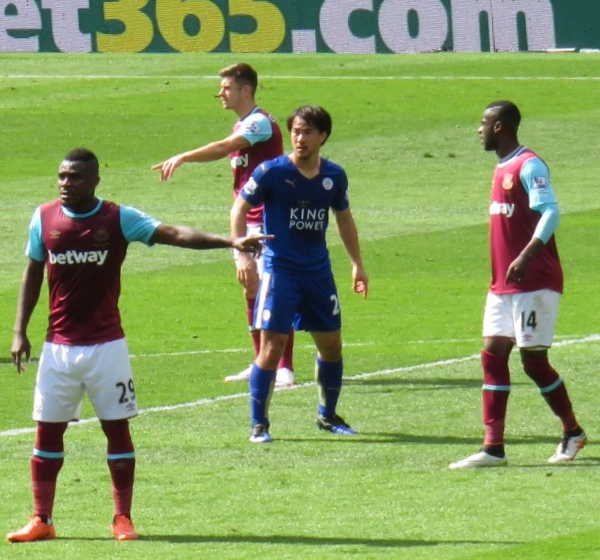
Shinji Okazaki won the Premier League with Leicester City in 2016

- **Wataru Endo** – **Liverpool** – 2023–
- Daiki Hashioka – Luton Town – 2023–24
- Junichi Inamoto – Fulham, West Bromwich Albion – 2002–06
- Shinji Kagawa – Manchester United – 2012–14
- **Daichi Kamada** – **Crystal Palace** – 2024–
- **Daizen Maeda** – **Ipswich Town** – 2026–
- Takumi Minamino – Liverpool, Southampton – 2019–22
- **Kaoru Mitoma** – **Brighton & Hove Albion** – 2022–
- Ryo Miyaichi – Bolton Wanderers, Wigan Athletic, Arsenal – 2011–14
- **Hidemasa Morita** – **Hull City** – 2026–
- Yoshinori Muto – Newcastle United – 2018–20
- Hidetoshi Nakata – Bolton Wanderers – 2005–06
- Shinji Okazaki – Leicester City – 2015–19
- **Tatsuhiro Sakamoto** – **Coventry City** – 2026–
- Yukinari Sugawara – Southampton – 2024–25
- **Zion Suzuki** – **Aston Villa** – 2026–
- **Ao Tanaka** – **Leeds United** – 2025–
- Kazuyuki Toda – Tottenham Hotspur – 2002–03
- **Takehiro Tomiyasu** – Arsenal, **Crystal Palace** – 2021–25, 2026–
- Maya Yoshida (**154**) – Southampton – 2012–20

=== Korea Republic (South Korea) ===
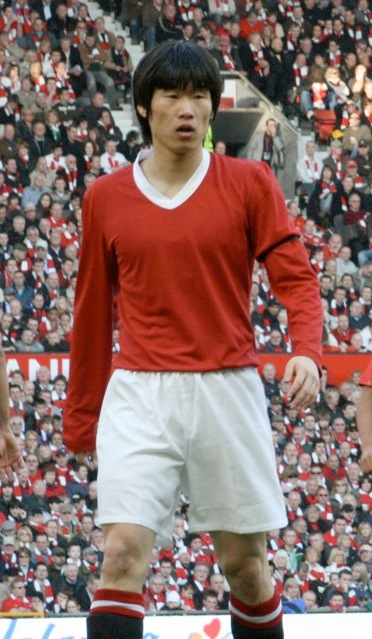
Park Ji-sung won four Premier League titles with Manchester United in 2007, 2008, 2009 and 2011

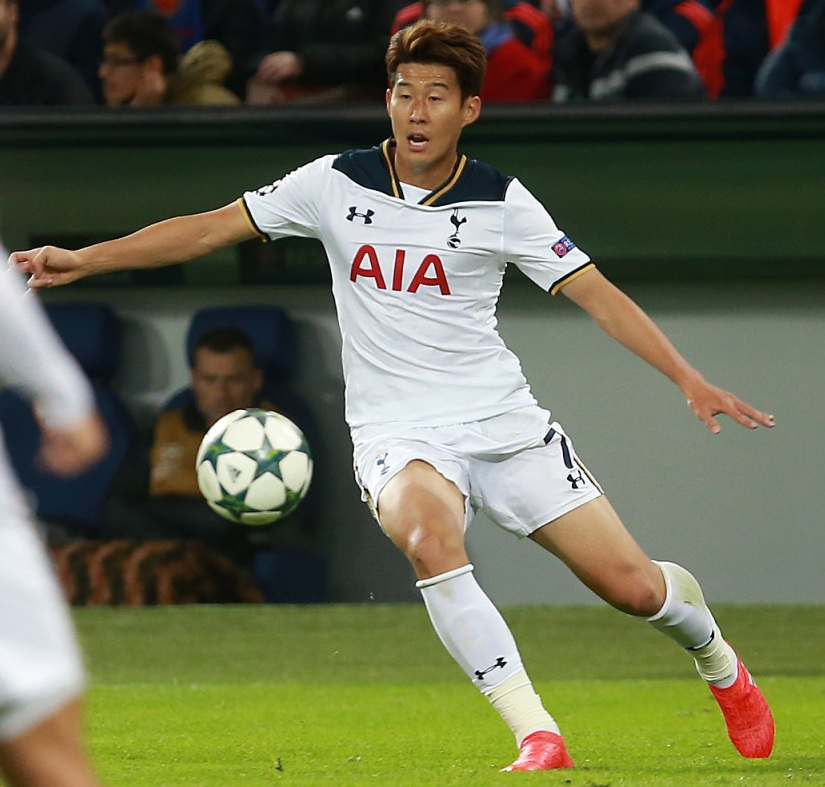
Son Heung-min became the first Asian to reach 100 Premier League goals in 2023 with Tottenham Hotspur

- Cho Won-hee – Wigan Athletic – 2008–10
- Hwang Hee-chan – Wolverhampton Wanderers – 2021–26
- Ji Dong-won – Sunderland – 2011–12, 2013–14
- Ki Sung-yueng – Swansea City, Sunderland, Newcastle United – 2012–20
- Kim Bo-kyung – Cardiff City – 2013–14
- Kim Do-heon – West Bromwich Albion – 2008–09
- Kim Ji-soo – Brentford – 2024–25
- Lee Chung-yong – Bolton Wanderers, Crystal Palace – 2009–12, 2014–18
- Lee Dong-gook – Middlesbrough – 2006–08
- Lee Young-pyo – Tottenham Hotspur – 2005–08
- Park Chu-young – Arsenal – 2011–12
- Park Ji-sung – Manchester United, Queens Park Rangers – 2005–13
- Seol Ki-hyeon – Reading, Fulham – 2006–10
- Son Heung-min (**333**) – Tottenham Hotspur – 2015–25
- Yun Suk-young – Queens Park Rangers – 2014–15

=== Lebanon ===
- Reda Khadra (**1**) – Brighton & Hove Albion – 2020–21

=== Oman ===
- Ali Al-Habsi (**111**) – Bolton Wanderers, Wigan Athletic – 2007–08, 2010–13

=== Pakistan ===
- Zesh Rehman (**21**) – Fulham – 2003–06

=== Philippines ===
- Neil Etheridge (**38**) – Cardiff City – 2018–19

=== Syria ===
- Mahmoud Dahoud (**9**) – Brighton & Hove Albion – 2023–24

=== Uzbekistan ===
- **Abdukodir Khusanov** (**30**) – **Manchester City** – 2024–

== Europe (UEFA) ==
=== Albania ===
- Armando Broja (**100**) – Chelsea, Southampton, Fulham, Everton, Burnley – 2019–20, 2021–26
- Lorik Cana – Sunderland – 2009–10
- Thomas Strakosha – Brentford – 2023–24

=== Armenia ===
- Henrikh Mkhitaryan (**78**) – Manchester United, Arsenal – 2016–20

=== Austria ===
- **David Affengruber** – **Fulham** – 2026–
- Marko Arnautović – Stoke City, West Ham United – 2013–19
- Daniel Bachmann – Watford – 2021–22
- Moritz Bauer – Stoke City – 2017–18
- Carney Chukwuemeka – Aston Villa, Chelsea – 2020–24
- **Kevin Danso** – Southampton, Tottenham Hotspur, **Sunderland** – 2019–20, 2024–
- Aleksandar Dragović – Leicester City – 2017–18
- Christian Fuchs – Leicester City – 2015–21
- Martin Hiden – Leeds United – 1997–2000
- Saša Kalajdžić – Wolverhampton Wanderers – 2022–24, 2025–26
- Valentino Lazaro – Newcastle United – 2019–20
- Jürgen Macho – Sunderland – 2000–03
- Stefan Maierhofer – Wolverhampton Wanderers – 2009–10, 2011–12
- Alex Manninger – Arsenal – 1997–2001
- Christian Mayrleb – Sheffield Wednesday – 1997–98
- Emanuel Pogatetz – Middlesbrough, West Ham United – 2005–09, 2012–13
- Sebastian Prödl – Watford – 2015–20
- Marcel Sabitzer – Manchester United – 2022–23
- Paul Scharner (**221**) – Wigan Athletic, West Bromwich Albion – 2005–12
- **Xaver Schlager** – **Nottingham Forest** – 2026–
- **Jannik Schuster** – **Brentford** – 2026–
- Markus Suttner – Brighton & Hove Albion – 2017–18
- **Michael Svoboda** – **Brighton & Hove Albion** – 2026–
- Andreas Weimann – Aston Villa – 2010–15
- Kevin Wimmer – Tottenham Hotspur, Stoke City – 2015–18
- Maximilian Wöber – Leeds United – 2022–23

=== Belarus ===
- Alexander Hleb (**108**) – Arsenal, Birmingham City – 2005–08, 2010–11
- Sergei Kornilenko – Blackpool – 2010–11

=== Belgium ===
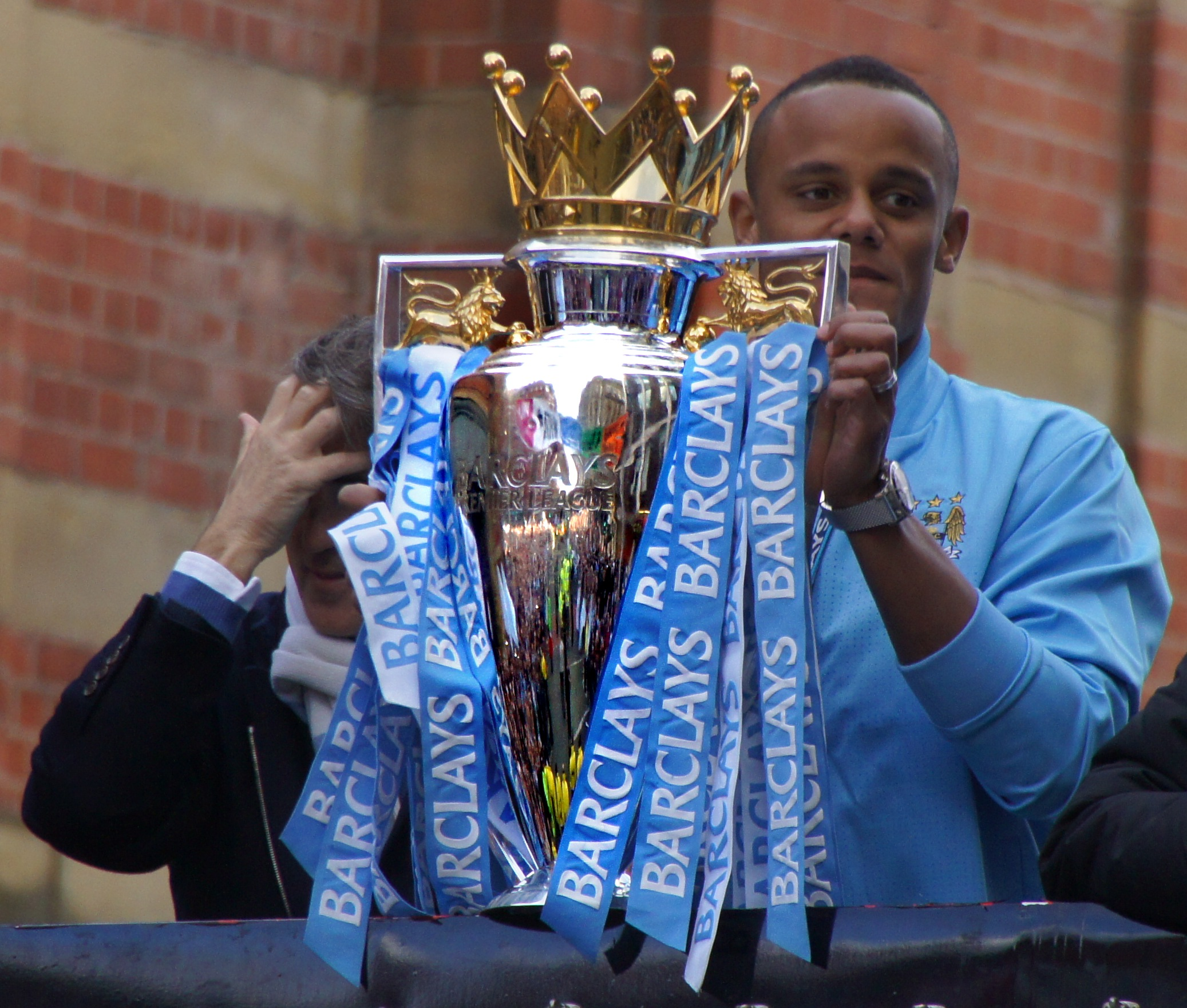
Vincent Kompany captained Manchester City to win the Premier League title in 2012, earning him the accolade of Player of the Season

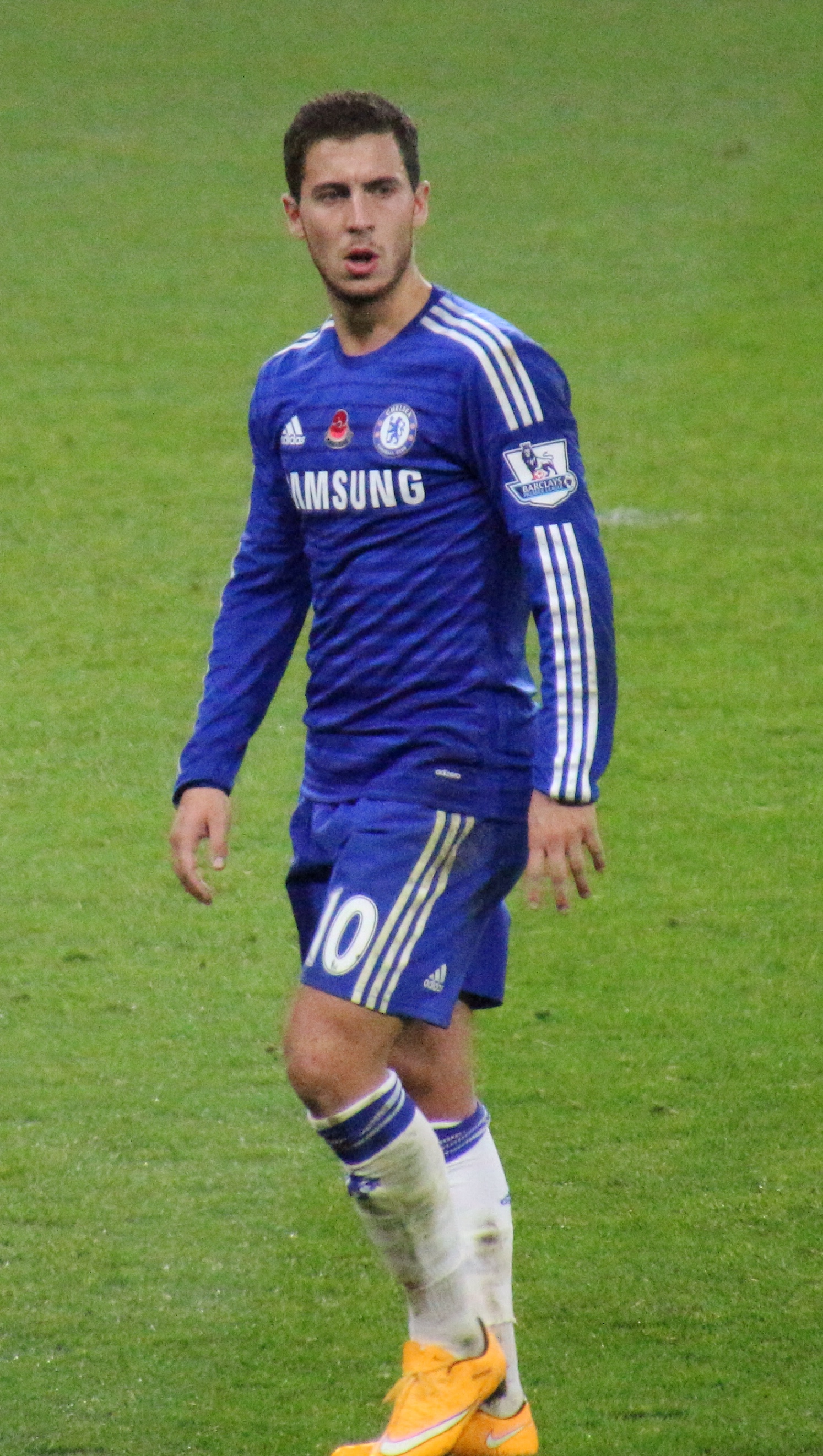
Eden Hazard was voted the Player of the Season after helping Chelsea to the Premier League title in 2015

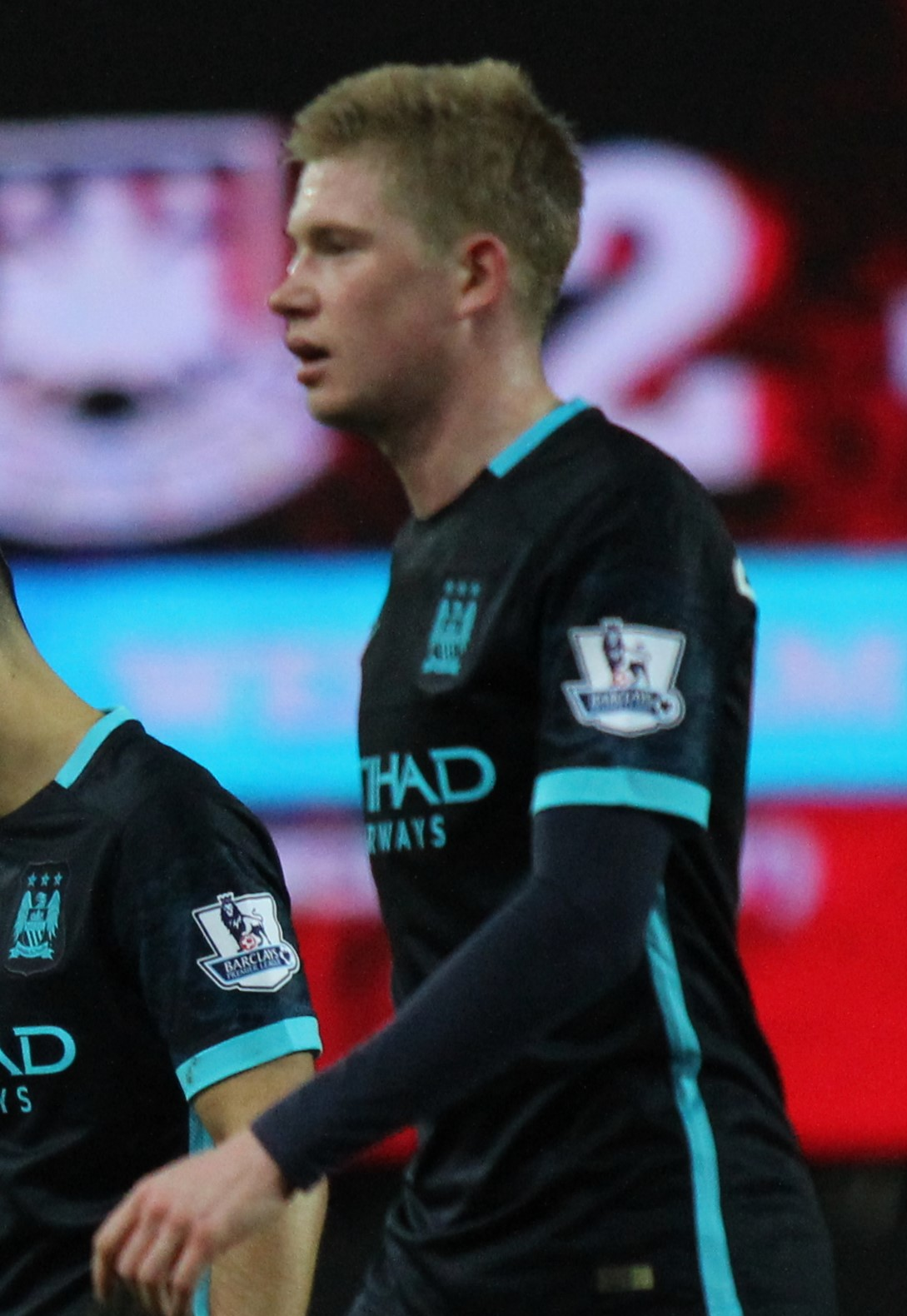
Kevin De Bruyne has won five Premier League titles with Manchester City, and was named Player of the Season twice

- Philippe Albert – Newcastle United – 1994–99
- Ameen Al-Dakhil – Burnley – 2023–24
- Toby Alderweireld – Southampton, Tottenham Hotspur – 2014–21
- Adrian Bakalli – Watford – 1999–2000
- Michy Batshuayi – Chelsea, Crystal Palace – 2016–21
- Christian Benteke – Aston Villa, Liverpool, Crystal Palace – 2012–22
- Jonathan Benteke – Crystal Palace – 2016–17
- Jonathan Blondel – Tottenham Hotspur – 2002–04
- Ruud Boffin – West Ham United – 2010–11
- Sebastiaan Bornauw – Leeds United – 2025–26
- Dedryck Boyata – Manchester City, Bolton Wanderers – 2009–12, 2013–15
- **Timothy Castagne** – Leicester City, **Fulham** – 2020–
- Nacer Chadli – Tottenham Hotspur, West Bromwich Albion – 2013–18
- Philippe Clement – Coventry City – 1998–99
- Thibaut Courtois – Chelsea – 2014–18
- Gilles De Bilde – Sheffield Wednesday, Aston Villa – 1999–2001
- Kevin De Bruyne (**288**) – Chelsea, Manchester City – 2013–14, 2015–25
- **Maxim De Cuyper** – **Brighton & Hove Albion** – 2025–
- Steven Defour – Burnley – 2016–19
- Marc Degryse – Sheffield Wednesday – 1995–96
- Ritchie De Laet – Manchester United, Norwich City, Leicester City – 2008–10, 2011–12, 2014–16
- Mousa Dembélé – Fulham, Tottenham Hotspur – 2010–19
- Jason Denayer – Sunderland – 2016–17
- Leander Dendoncker – Wolverhampton Wanderers, Aston Villa – 2018–24
- Laurent Depoitre – Huddersfield Town – 2017–19
- Steve De Ridder – Southampton – 2012–13
- **Jérémy Doku** – **Manchester City** – 2023–
- Björn Engels – Aston Villa – 2019–20
- Wout Faes – Leicester City – 2022–23, 2024–25
- Marouane Fellaini – Everton, Manchester United – 2008–19
- **Matias Fernandez-Pardo** – **Newcastle United** – 2026–
- **Malick Fofana** – **Sunderland** – 2026–
- **Kaye Furo** – **Brentford** – 2025–
- Régis Genaux – Coventry City – 1996–97
- Eden Hazard – Chelsea – 2012–19
- Carl Hoefkens – West Bromwich Albion – 2008–09
- Adnan Januzaj – Manchester United, Sunderland – 2013–17
- Christian Kabasele – Watford – 2016–20, 2021–22
- Thomas Kaminski – Luton Town – 2023–24
- Vincent Kompany – Manchester City – 2008–19
- Roland Lamah – Swansea City – 2012–14
- **Senne Lammens** – **Manchester United** – 2025–
- **Roméo Lavia** – Southampton, **Chelsea** – 2022–
- Romelu Lukaku – Chelsea, West Bromwich Albion, Everton, Manchester United – 2011–19, 2021–22
- Dodi Lukebakio – Watford – 2017–18
- Orel Mangala – Nottingham Forest, Everton – 2022–25
- Isaac Mbenza – Huddersfield Town – 2018–19
- **Thomas Meunier** – **Sunderland** – 2026–
- Simon Mignolet – Sunderland, Liverpool – 2010–18
- Kevin Mirallas – Everton – 2012–18
- Émile Mpenza – Manchester City – 2006–08
- Geoffrey Mujangi Bia – Wolverhampton Wanderers – 2009–11
- Charly Musonda – Chelsea – 2017–18
- Julien Ngoy – Stoke City – 2016–18
- Luc Nilis – Aston Villa – 2000–01
- Vadis Odjidja-Ofoe – Norwich City – 2015–16
- **Amadou Onana** – Everton, **Aston Villa** – 2022–
- Divock Origi – Liverpool, Nottingham Forest – 2015–22, 2023–24
- Obbi Oularé – Watford – 2015–16
- **Mike Penders** – **Chelsea** – 2026–
- Sébastien Pocognoli – West Bromwich Albion – 2014–16
- Dennis Praet – Leicester City – 2019–21, 2022–23
- Cédric Roussel – Coventry City – 1999–2001
- Albert Sambi Lokonga – Arsenal, Crystal Palace, Luton Town – 2021–24
- **Matz Sels** – **Nottingham Forest** – 2023–
- Branko Strupar – Derby County – 1999–2002
- **Youri Tielemans** – Leicester City, Aston Villa, **Manchester United** – 2018–
- Mike Trésor – Burnley – 2023–24, 2025–26
- Leandro Trossard – Brighton & Hove Albion, Arsenal – 2019–26
- Nico Vaesen – Birmingham City – 2002–03, 2005–06
- Daniel Van Buyten – Manchester City – 2003–04
- Jelle Van Damme – Southampton, Wolverhampton Wanderers – 2004–05, 2010–11
- Anthony Vanden Borre – Portsmouth – 2009–10
- Thomas Vermaelen – Arsenal – 2009–14
- Jan Vertonghen – Tottenham Hotspur – 2012–20

=== Bosnia and Herzegovina ===
- Anel Ahmedhodžić – Sheffield United – 2023–24
- Asmir Begović (**256**) – Portsmouth, Stoke City, Chelsea, Bournemouth, Everton – 2008–19, 2021–23
- Muhamed Bešić – Everton, Sheffield United – 2014–16, 2017–18, 2019–20
- **Amar Dedić** – **Newcastle United** – 2026–
- Edin Džeko – Manchester City – 2011–15
- Sead Kolašinac – Arsenal – 2017–22
- Muhamed Konjić – Coventry City – 1998–2001
- **Tarik Muharemović** – **Leeds United** – 2026–
- Mario Vrančić – Norwich City – 2019–20

=== Bulgaria ===
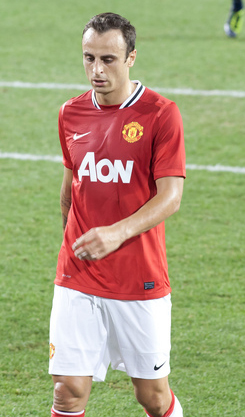
Dimitar Berbatov won two Premier League titles with Manchester United, and was the league's top scorer in 2010–11

- Dimitar Berbatov (**229**) – Tottenham Hotspur, Manchester United, Fulham – 2006–14
- Valeri Bojinov – Manchester City – 2007–09
- Boncho Genchev – Ipswich Town – 1992–95
- **Ilia Gruev** – **Leeds United** – 2025–
- Radostin Kishishev – Charlton Athletic – 2000–07
- Stanislav Manolev – Fulham – 2012–13
- Martin Petrov – Manchester City, Bolton Wanderers – 2007–12
- Stiliyan Petrov – Aston Villa – 2006–12
- Svetoslav Todorov – West Ham United, Portsmouth, Wigan Athletic – 2000–02, 2003–04, 2005–07
- Aleksandar Tonev – Aston Villa – 2013–14

=== Croatia ===
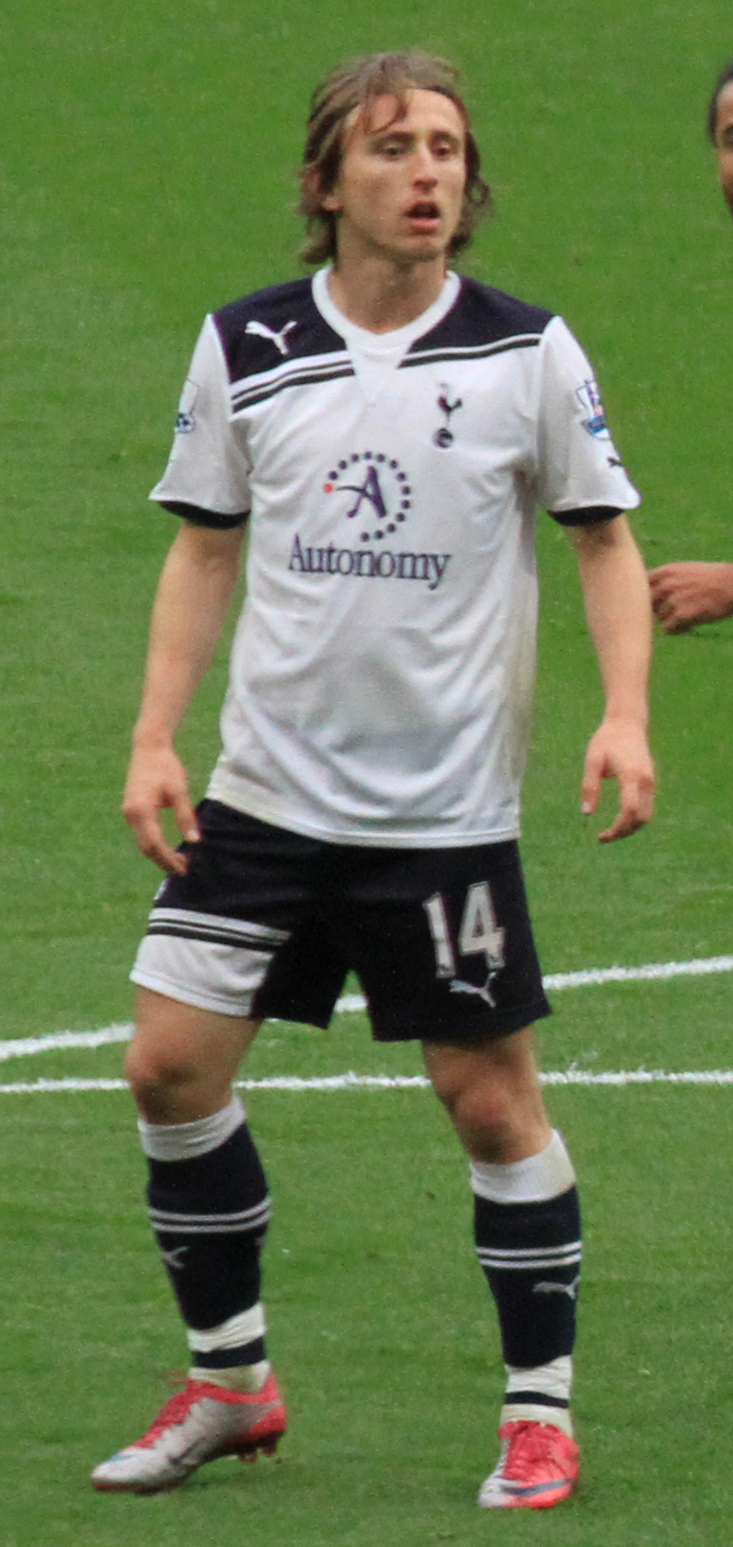
Luka Modrić helped lead Tottenham Hotspur to their first ever Champions League appearance

- Aljoša Asanović – Derby County – 1996–98
- Boško Balaban – Aston Villa – 2001–02
- Slaven Bilić – West Ham United, Everton – 1995–99
- Igor Bišćan – Liverpool – 2000–05
- Alen Bokšić – Middlesbrough – 2000–03
- Duje Ćaleta-Car – Southampton – 2022–23
- Vedran Ćorluka – Manchester City, Tottenham Hotspur – 2007–12
- Eduardo – Arsenal – 2007–08, 2009–10
- Ivo Grbić – Sheffield United – 2023–24
- **Joško Gvardiol** – **Manchester City** – 2023–
- Nikica Jelavić – Everton, Hull City, West Ham United – 2011–16
- Nikola Jerkan – Nottingham Forest – 1996–97
- Nikola Kalinić – Blackburn Rovers – 2009–11
- Ivan Klasnić – Bolton Wanderers – 2009–12
- **Mateo Kovačić** (**211**) – Chelsea, **Manchester City** – 2018–
- Andrej Kramarić – Leicester City – 2014–16
- Niko Kranjčar – Portsmouth, Tottenham Hotspur, Queens Park Rangers – 2006–12, 2014–15
- Filip Krovinović – West Bromwich Albion – 2020–21
- Dejan Lovren – Southampton, Liverpool – 2013–20
- Silvio Marić – Newcastle United – 1998–2000
- Luka Modrić – Tottenham Hotspur – 2008–12
- Ivica Mornar – Portsmouth – 2003–04, 2005–06
- Mislav Oršić – Southampton – 2022–23
- Ivan Perišić – Tottenham Hotspur – 2022–24
- Mladen Petrić – Fulham, West Ham United – 2012–14
- **Borna Sosa** – **Crystal Palace** – 2025–
- Mario Stanić – Chelsea – 2000–04
- Igor Štimac – Derby County, West Ham United – 1996–2001
- Davor Šuker – Arsenal, West Ham United – 1999–2001
- Nikola Vlašić – Everton, West Ham United – 2017–18, 2021–22
- **Luka Vušković** – **Brighton & Hove Albion** – 2026–
- Boris Živković – Portsmouth – 2003–04

=== Cyprus ===
- Marcus Edwards (**23**) – Burnley – 2025–26
- Alexis Nicolas – Chelsea – 2003–04
- Nikodimos Papavasiliou – Newcastle United – 1993–94
- Valentin Roberge – Sunderland – 2013–15

=== Czech Republic ===
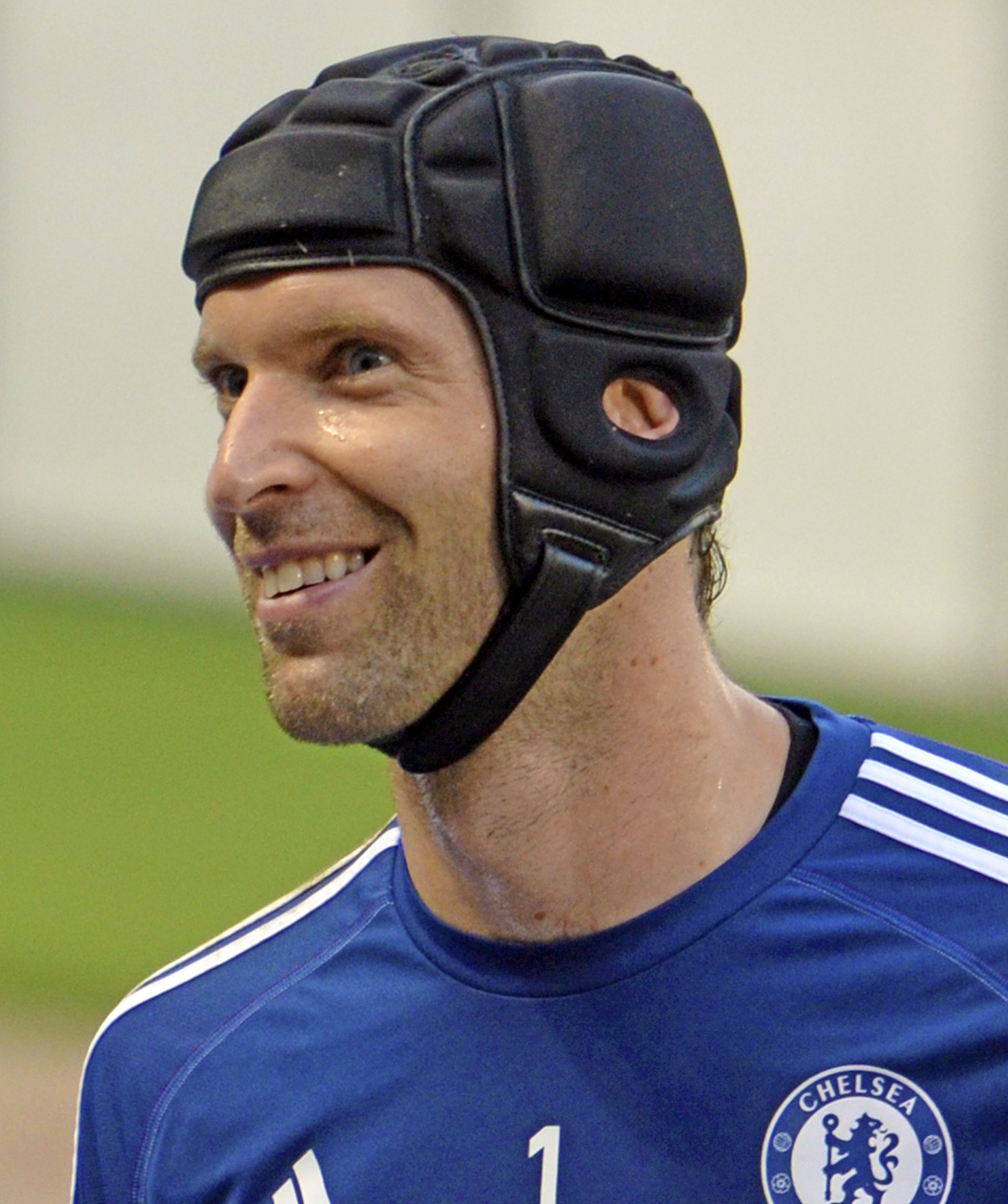
Petr Čech won four Premier League titles with Chelsea and holds the most Premier League clean sheets

- Milan Baroš – Liverpool, Aston Villa, Portsmouth – 2002–08
- Roman Bednář – West Bromwich Albion – 2008–09, 2010–11
- Patrik Berger – Liverpool, Portsmouth, Aston Villa – 1996–2008
- Petr Čech (**443**) – Chelsea, Arsenal – 2004–19
- Ondřej Čelůstka – Sunderland – 2013–14
- Radek Černý – Tottenham Hotspur, Queens Park Rangers – 2004–05, 2007–08, 2011–12
- Vladimír Coufal – West Ham United – 2020–25
- Marcel Gecov – Fulham – 2011–12
- Zdeněk Grygera – Fulham – 2011–12
- **Lukáš Horníček** – **Newcastle United** – 2026–
- Vítězslav Jaroš – Liverpool – 2024–25
- Jiří Jarošík – Chelsea, Birmingham City – 2004–06
- Martin Jiránek – Birmingham City – 2010–11
- Tomáš Kalas – Chelsea – 2013–14
- **Antonín Kinský** – **Tottenham Hotspur** – 2024–
- Radoslav Kováč – West Ham United – 2008–11
- Libor Kozák – Aston Villa – 2013–14, 2015–16
- Alex Král – West Ham United – 2021–22
- Ladislav Krejčí – Wolverhampton Wanderers – 2025–26
- Jan Laštůvka – Fulham – 2006–07
- Martin Latka – Birmingham City – 2005–06
- Marek Matějovský – Reading – 2007–08
- Luděk Mikloško – West Ham United – 1993–98
- Karel Poborský – Manchester United – 1996–98
- Tomáš Řepka – West Ham United – 2001–03, 2005–06
- Tomáš Rosický – Arsenal – 2006–08, 2009–15
- David Rozehnal – Newcastle United – 2007–08
- Vladimír Šmicer – Liverpool – 1999–2005
- Tomáš Souček – West Ham United – 2019–26
- Pavel Srníček – Newcastle United, Sheffield Wednesday, Portsmouth – 1993–2000, 2003–04, 2006–07
- Jan Stejskal – Queens Park Rangers – 1992–94
- Matěj Vydra – West Bromwich Albion, Watford, Burnley – 2013–14, 2016–17, 2018–22

=== Denmark ===
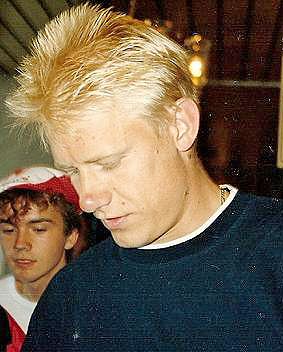
Peter Schmeichel won five Premier League titles with Manchester United and is the only goalkeeper to be voted Player of the Season

- Daniel Agger – Liverpool – 2005–14
- Martin Albrechtsen – West Bromwich Albion – 2004–06
- **Joachim Andersen** – **Fulham**, Crystal Palace – 2020–
- Mads Juel Andersen – Luton Town – 2023–24
- Stephan Andersen – Charlton Athletic – 2004–06
- Leon Andreasen – Fulham – 2007–09
- Mikkel Beck – Middlesbrough, Derby County – 1996–97, 1998–2000
- Nicklas Bendtner – Arsenal, Sunderland – 2007–14
- Mads Bidstrup – Brentford – 2021–22
- Philip Billing – Huddersfield Town, Bournemouth – 2017–20, 2022–25
- Mikkel Bischoff – Manchester City – 2002–03
- Jacob Bruun Larsen – Burnley – 2023–24, 2025–26
- Oskar Buur – Wolverhampton Wanderers – 2020–21
- Andreas Christensen – Chelsea – 2014–15, 2017–22
- Andreas Cornelius – Cardiff City – 2013–14
- **Mikkel Damsgaard** – **Brentford** – 2022–
- Peter Degn – Everton – 1998–99
- **Patrick Dorgu** – **Manchester United** – 2024–
- Ronnie Ekelund – Southampton, Manchester City – 1994–96
- Christian Eriksen – Tottenham Hotspur, Brentford, Manchester United – 2013–20, 2021–25
- Viktor Fischer – Middlesbrough – 2016–17
- Per Frandsen – Bolton Wanderers – 1997–98, 2001–04
- Carsten Fredgaard – Sunderland – 1999–2000
- Thomas Gaardsøe – Ipswich Town, West Bromwich Albion – 2001–02, 2004–06
- Bjarne Goldbæk – Chelsea, Fulham – 1998–2000, 2001–03
- Thomas Gravesen – Everton – 2000–05, 2007–08
- Albert Grønbæk – Southampton – 2024–25
- Jesper Grønkjær – Chelsea, Birmingham City – 2000–05
- Bo Hansen – Bolton Wanderers – 2001–02
- Jakob Haugaard – Stoke City – 2015–17
- Nicklas Helenius – Aston Villa – 2013–14
- Thomas Helveg – Norwich City – 2004–05
- Mads Hermansen – Leicester City, West Ham United – 2024–26
- Jes Høgh – Chelsea – 1999–2000
- Pierre-Emile Højbjerg – Southampton, Tottenham Hotspur – 2016–24
- Rasmus Højlund – Manchester United – 2023–25
- Daniel Iversen – Leicester City – 2022–23
- Lars Jacobsen – Everton, Blackburn Rovers, West Ham United – 2008–11
- Brian Jensen – Burnley – 2009–10
- Claus Jensen – Charlton Athletic, Fulham – 2000–07
- John Jensen – Arsenal – 1992–96
- **Mathias Jensen** – **Brentford** – 2021–
- Niclas Jensen – Manchester City, Fulham – 2002–03, 2005–06
- Martin Johansen – Coventry City – 1997–98
- Michael Johansen – Bolton Wanderers – 1997–98
- Filip Jörgensen – Chelsea – 2024–26
- Mathias Jørgensen – Huddersfield Town, Brentford – 2017–19, 2021–24
- Jakob Kjeldbjerg – Chelsea – 1993–95
- Rasmus Kristensen – Leeds United – 2022–23
- Victor Kristiansen – Leicester City – 2022–23, 2024–25
- Per Krøldrup – Everton – 2005–06
- William Kvist – Fulham – 2013–14
- Brian Laudrup – Chelsea – 1998–99
- Jacob Laursen – Derby County, Leicester City – 1996–2000, 2001–02
- Martin Laursen – Aston Villa – 2004–09
- Anders Lindegaard – Manchester United – 2011–14
- Jesper Lindstrøm – Everton – 2024–25
- Jonas Lössl – Huddersfield Town, Brentford – 2017–19, 2021–22
- Peter Løvenkrands – Newcastle United – 2008–09, 2010–12
- Emiliano Marcondes – Bournemouth – 2022–23
- Jan Mølby – Liverpool – 1992–95
- Allan Nielsen – Tottenham Hotspur – 1996–2000
- **Christian Nørgaard** – Brentford, Arsenal, **Everton** – 2021–
- Chido Obi – Manchester United – 2024–25
- Jores Okore – Aston Villa – 2013–16
- **Matt O'Riley** – **Brighton & Hove Albion** – 2024–
- **William Osula** – Sheffield United, **Newcastle United** – 2023–
- Henrik Pedersen – Bolton Wanderers – 2001–07
- Per Pedersen – Blackburn Rovers – 1996–97
- Torben Piechnik – Liverpool – 1992–94
- Christian Poulsen – Liverpool – 2010–11
- Brian Priske – Portsmouth – 2005–06
- Marc Rieper – West Ham United – 1994–98
- Mads Roerslev – Brentford – 2021–25
- Dennis Rommedahl – Charlton Athletic – 2004–07
- Kasper Schmeichel – Manchester City, Leicester City – 2007–09, 2014–22
- Peter Schmeichel – Manchester United, Aston Villa, Manchester City – 1992–99, 2001–03
- Jacob Sørensen – Norwich City – 2021–22
- Lasse Sørensen – Stoke City – 2017–18
- Mads Bech Sørensen – Brentford – 2021–23
- Thomas Sørensen (**364**) – Sunderland, Aston Villa, Stoke City – 1999–2007, 2008–12, 2013–14
- Kevin Stuhr Ellegaard – Manchester City – 2003–04
- Claus Thomsen – Ipswich Town, Everton – 1994–95, 1996–98
- Stig Tøfting – Bolton Wanderers – 2001–03
- Jon Dahl Tomasson – Newcastle United – 1997–98
- **Victor Torp** – **Coventry City** – 2026–
- Jannik Vestergaard – Southampton, Leicester City – 2018–22, 2024–25
- Kenneth Zohore – Cardiff City – 2018–19

=== Estonia ===
- Ragnar Klavan – Liverpool – 2016–18
- Mart Poom (**138**) – Derby County, Sunderland, Arsenal – 1997–2003, 2006–07

=== Faroe Islands ===
- Gunnar Nielsen (**1**) – Manchester City – 2009–10

=== Finland ===
- Peter Enckelman – Aston Villa, Blackburn Rovers – 1999–2000, 2001–04
- Marcus Forss – Brentford – 2021–22
- Mikael Forssell – Chelsea, Birmingham City – 1998–99, 2001–02, 2003–06, 2007–08
- Sami Hyypiä – Liverpool – 1999–2009
- Jussi Jääskeläinen (**436**) – Bolton Wanderers, West Ham United – 2001–15
- Jonatan Johansson – Charlton Athletic – 2000–06
- Toni Kallio – Fulham – 2008–10
- Joonas Kolkka – Crystal Palace – 2004–05
- Shefki Kuqi – Blackburn Rovers, Fulham, Newcastle United – 2005–08, 2010–11
- Jari Litmanen – Liverpool – 2000–02
- Antti Niemi – Southampton, Fulham – 2002–08
- Mixu Paatelainen – Bolton Wanderers – 1995–96
- Petri Pasanen – Portsmouth – 2003–04
- Teemu Pukki – Norwich City – 2019–20, 2021–22
- Aki Riihilahti – Crystal Palace – 2004–05
- Teemu Tainio – Tottenham Hotspur, Sunderland, Birmingham City – 2005–10
- Jimi Tauriainen – Chelsea – 2023–24
- Hannu Tihinen – West Ham United – 2000–01
- Simo Valakari – Derby County – 2000–02

=== France ===
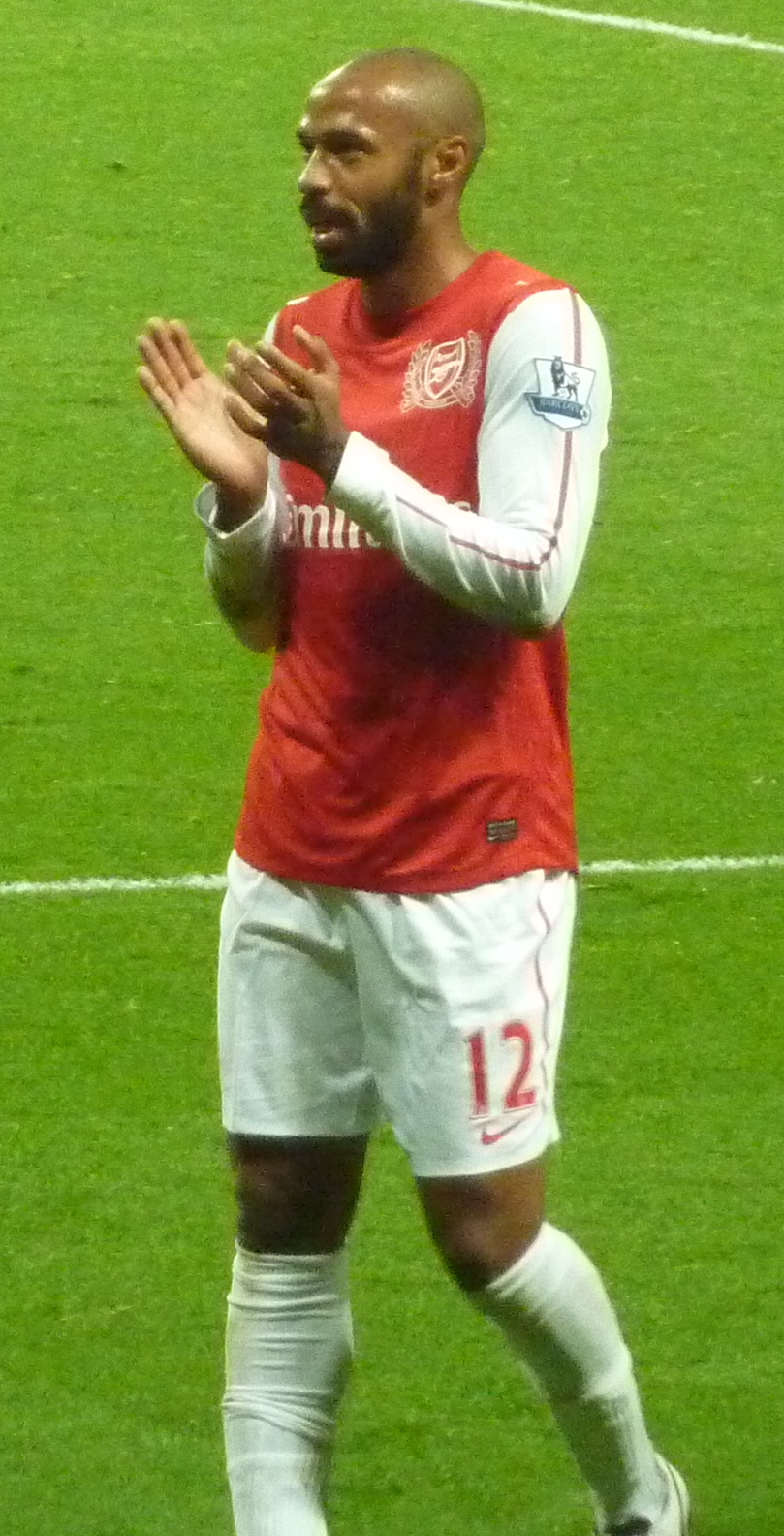
With 175 goals, all for Arsenal, Thierry Henry is the third highest-scoring foreign player in Premier League history

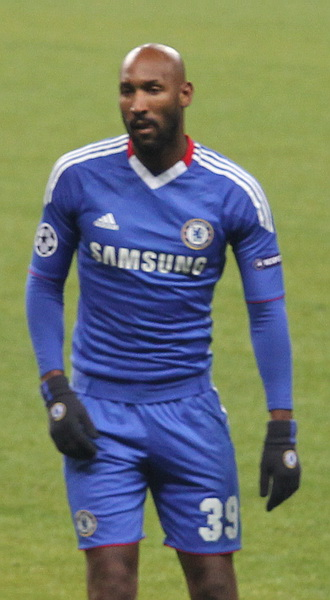
Nicolas Anelka won the Premier League at Arsenal and Chelsea

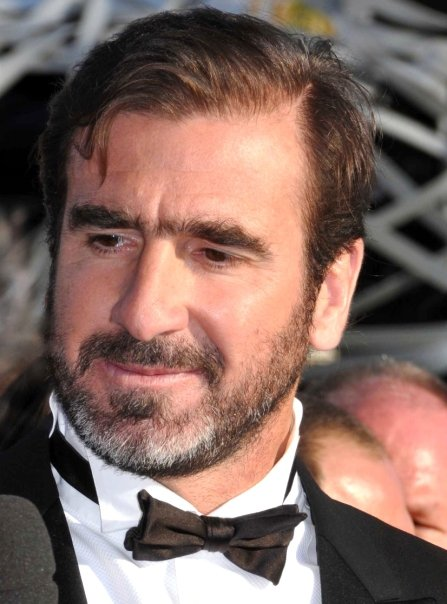
Eric Cantona captained Manchester United to one title, winning four overall

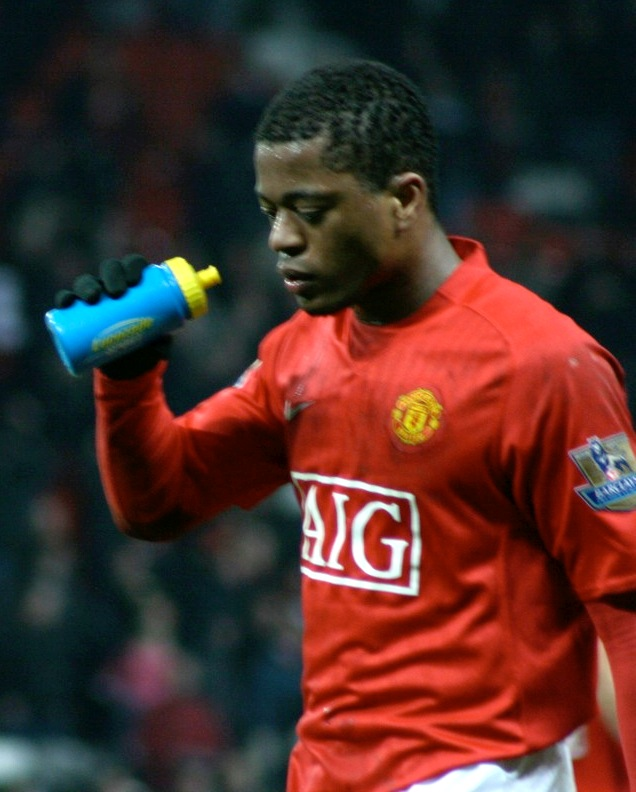
Patrice Evra won the Premier League five times with Manchester United

- Samassi Abou – West Ham United – 1997–99
- Didier Agathe – Aston Villa – 2006–07
- Naouirou Ahamada – Crystal Palace – 2022–24
- Ibrahim Amadou – Norwich City – 2019–20
- Morgan Amalfitano – West Bromwich Albion, West Ham United – 2013–15
- Jordan Amavi – Aston Villa – 2015–16
- Jérémie Aliadière – Arsenal, West Ham United, Middlesbrough – 2001–09
- Bernard Allou – Nottingham Forest – 1998–99
- Mathis Amougou – Chelsea – 2024–25
- Pierre-Yves André – Bolton Wanderers – 2002–03
- Nicolas Anelka – Arsenal, Liverpool, Manchester City, Bolton Wanderers, Chelsea, West Bromwich Albion – 1996–99, 2001–05, 2006–12, 2013–14
- Alphonse Areola – Fulham, West Ham United – 2020–26
- Pegguy Arphexad – Leicester City, Liverpool – 1997–2000, 2001–02
- Lorenz Assignon – Burnley – 2023–24
- Cédric Avinel – Watford – 2006–07
- Ibrahim Ba – Bolton Wanderers – 2003–04
- Benoît Badiashile – Chelsea – 2022–26
- **Jean-Mattéo Bahoya** – **Leeds United** – 2026–
- Tiémoué Bakayoko – Chelsea – 2017–18
- Dilane Bakwa – Nottingham Forest – 2025–26
- **Aladji Bamba** – **Newcastle United** – 2026–
- **Bradley Barcola** – **Liverpool** – 2026–
- **Melvin Bard** – **Leeds United** – 2026–
- **Thierno Barry** – **Everton** – 2025–
- Fabien Barthez – Manchester United – 2000–03
- David Bellion – Sunderland, Manchester United, West Ham United – 2001–06
- Hatem Ben Arfa – Newcastle United, Hull City – 2010–15
- Olivier Bernard – Newcastle United, Southampton – 2001–05
- Mathieu Berson – Aston Villa – 2004–05
- Giulian Biancone – Nottingham Forest – 2022–23
- Laurent Blanc – Manchester United – 2001–03
- Patrick Blondeau – Sheffield Wednesday – 1997–98
- Thierry Bonalair – Nottingham Forest – 1998–99
- Jérôme Bonnissel – Fulham – 2003–04
- Alexandre Bonnot – Watford – 1999–2000
- **Olivier Boscagli** – **Brighton & Hove Albion** – 2025–
- Jean-Alain Boumsong – Newcastle United – 2004–06
- Yohan Cabaye – Newcastle United, Crystal Palace – 2011–14, 2015–18
- Rémy Cabella – Newcastle United – 2014–15
- Zoumana Camara – Leeds United – 2003–04
- Vincent Candela – Bolton Wanderers – 2004–05
- Eric Cantona – Leeds United, Manchester United – 1992–97
- **Jaydee Canvot** – **Crystal Palace** – 2025–
- Étienne Capoue – Tottenham Hotspur, Watford – 2013–20
- Patrice Carteron – Sunderland – 2000–01
- Johan Cavalli – Watford – 2006–07
- Cyril Chapuis – Leeds United – 2003–04
- Laurent Charvet – Chelsea, Newcastle United, Manchester City – 1997–2001
- **Rayan Cherki** – **Manchester City** – 2025–
- Bruno Cheyrou – Liverpool – 2002–04
- Pascal Chimbonda – Wigan Athletic, Tottenham Hotspur, Sunderland, Blackburn Rovers – 2005–11
- **Mohamed-Ali Cho** – **Hull City** – 2026–
- Philippe Christanval – Fulham – 2005–08
- Gérald Cid – Bolton Wanderers – 2007–08
- Djibril Cissé – Liverpool, Sunderland, Queens Park Rangers – 2004–06, 2008–09, 2011–13
- Édouard Cissé – West Ham United – 2002–03
- Aly Cissokho – Liverpool, Aston Villa – 2013–16
- Gaël Clichy – Arsenal, Manchester City – 2003–17
- Patrick Colleter – Southampton – 1998–2000
- Francis Coquelin – Arsenal – 2011–13, 2014–18
- Laurent Courtois – West Ham United – 2001–02
- Pascal Cygan – Arsenal – 2002–06
- Ousmane Dabo – Manchester City – 2006–07
- Olivier Dacourt – Everton, Leeds United, Fulham – 1998–99, 2000–03, 2008–09
- Stéphane Dalmat – Tottenham Hotspur – 2003–04
- Loïc Damour – Cardiff City – 2018–19
- Jean-Claude Darcheville – Nottingham Forest – 1998–99
- Mickaël Debève – Middlesbrough – 2001–02
- Mathieu Debuchy – Newcastle United, Arsenal – 2012–17
- Moussa Dembélé – Fulham – 2013–14
- Marcel Desailly – Chelsea – 1998–2004
- Didier Deschamps – Chelsea – 1999–2000
- Abou Diaby – Arsenal – 2005–14
- Moussa Diaby – Aston Villa – 2023–24
- Adama Diakhaby – Huddersfield Town – 2018–19
- **Bafodé Diakité** – **Bournemouth** – 2025–
- Modibo Diakité – Sunderland – 2013–14
- Ibrahima Diallo – Southampton – 2020–23
- Alou Diarra – West Ham United – 2012–13
- Lassana Diarra – Chelsea, Arsenal, Portsmouth – 2005–09
- Didier Digard – Middlesbrough – 2008–09
- Lucas Digne – Everton, Aston Villa – 2018–26
- Bernard Diomède – Liverpool – 2000–01
- **Axel Disasi** – Chelsea, Aston Villa, West Ham United, **Crystal Palace** – 2023–
- Sylvain Distin (**469**) – Newcastle United, Manchester City, Portsmouth, Everton, Bournemouth – 2001–16
- Martin Djetou – Fulham, Bolton Wanderers – 2002–04, 2005–06
- Youri Djorkaeff – Bolton Wanderers, Blackburn Rovers – 2001–05
- Didier Domi – Newcastle United, Leeds United – 1998–2001, 2003–04
- Pierre Ducrocq – Derby County – 2001–02
- Christophe Dugarry – Birmingham City – 2002–04
- Franck Dumas – Newcastle United – 1999–2000
- Odsonne Édouard – Crystal Palace, Leicester City – 2021–26
- **Hugo Ekitike** – **Liverpool** – 2025–
- Mario Espartero – Bolton Wanderers – 2001–02
- Maxime Estève – Burnley – 2023–24, 2025–26
- Patrice Evra – Manchester United, West Ham United – 2005–14, 2017–18
- Romain Faivre – Bournemouth – 2023–24
- Julien Faubert – West Ham United – 2007–11
- Fabrice Fernandes – Southampton, Bolton Wanderers – 2001–06
- Jean-Michel Ferri – Liverpool – 1998–99
- Mathieu Flamini – Arsenal, Crystal Palace – 2004–08, 2013–17
- **Wesley Fofana** – Leicester City, **Chelsea** – 2020–23, 2024–
- Marc-Antoine Fortuné – West Bromwich Albion – 2008–09, 2010–12
- Dimitri Foulquier – Watford – 2019–20
- William Gallas – Chelsea, Arsenal, Tottenham Hotspur – 2001–13
- Rémi Garde – Arsenal – 1996–99
- David Ginola – Newcastle United, Tottenham Hotspur, Aston Villa, Everton – 1995–2002
- Olivier Giroud – Arsenal, Chelsea – 2012–21
- Gaël Givet – Blackburn Rovers – 2008–12
- Alain Goma – Newcastle United, Fulham – 1999–2006
- Bafétimbi Gomis – Swansea City – 2014–16
- Yoan Gouffran – Newcastle United – 2012–16
- Hérold Goulon – Blackburn Rovers – 2010–11
- **Lucas Gourna-Douath** – **Hull City** – 2026–
- Elliot Grandin – Blackpool – 2010–11
- Xavier Gravelaine – Watford – 1999–2000
- François Grenet – Derby County – 2001–02
- Léandre Griffit – Southampton – 2003–05
- Gilles Grimandi – Arsenal – 1997–2002
- David Grondin – Arsenal – 1998–99
- Matteo Guendouzi – Arsenal – 2018–20
- Frédéric Guilbert – Aston Villa – 2019–20
- Stéphane Guivarc'h – Newcastle United – 1998–99
- **Malo Gusto** – **Chelsea** – 2023–
- Thierry Henry – Arsenal – 1999–2007, 2011–12
- Valérien Ismaël – Crystal Palace – 1997–98
- **Jérémy Jacquet** – **Liverpool** – 2026–
- Younès Kaboul – Tottenham Hotspur, Portsmouth, Sunderland, Watford – 2007–18
- **Boubacar Kamara** – **Aston Villa** – 2022–
- N'Golo Kanté – Leicester City, Chelsea – 2015–23
- **Arnaud Kalimuendo** – **Nottingham Forest** – 2025–
- Olivier Kapo – Birmingham City, Wigan Athletic – 2007–10
- Christian Karembeu – Middlesbrough – 2000–01
- Joachim Kayi Sanda – Southampton – 2024–25
- Marc Keller – West Ham United – 1998–2000
- Yann Kermorgant – Bournemouth – 2015–16
- Anthony Knockaert – Leicester City, Brighton & Hove Albion – 2014–15, 2017–19
- Randal Kolo Muani – Tottenham Hotspur – 2025–26
- Ibrahima Konaté – Liverpool – 2021–26
- Laurent Koscielny – Arsenal – 2010–19
- **Eli Junior Kroupi** – **Bournemouth** – 2025–
- Layvin Kurzawa – Fulham – 2022–23
- Alexandre Lacazette – Arsenal – 2017–22
- **Maxence Lacroix** – Crystal Palace, **Chelsea** – 2024–
- Bernard Lama – West Ham United – 1997–98
- Bernard Lambourde – Chelsea – 1997–2001
- Lilian Laslandes – Sunderland – 2001–02
- Pierre Laurent – Leeds United – 1996–97
- Florent Laville – Bolton Wanderers – 2002–04
- **Enzo Le Fée** – **Sunderland** – 2025–
- Maxime Le Marchand – Fulham – 2018–19, 2020–21
- Ulrich Le Pen – Ipswich Town – 2001–02
- Anthony Le Tallec – Liverpool, Sunderland – 2003–06
- Frank Leboeuf – Chelsea – 1996–2001
- Pierre Lees-Melou – Norwich City – 2021–22
- Sylvain Legwinski – Fulham – 2001–06
- Florian Lejeune – Newcastle United – 2017–20
- Clément Lenglet – Tottenham Hotspur, Aston Villa – 2022–24
- Hugo Lloris – Tottenham Hotspur – 2012–23
- Matthieu Louis-Jean – Nottingham Forest – 1998–99
- Patrice Luzi – Liverpool – 2003–04
- Mickaël Madar – Everton – 1997–99
- Soungoutou Magassa – West Ham United – 2025–26
- Claude Makélélé – Chelsea – 2003–08
- Steed Malbranque – Fulham, Tottenham Hotspur, Sunderland – 2001–11
- Florent Malouda – Chelsea – 2007–13
- Steve Mandanda – Crystal Palace – 2016–17
- Mikael Mandron – Sunderland – 2012–13, 2014–15
- Eliaquim Mangala – Manchester City, Everton – 2014–16, 2017–18
- Sékou Mara – Southampton – 2022–23
- Steve Marlet – Fulham – 2001–04
- Anthony Martial – Manchester United – 2015–24
- Lilian Martin – Derby County – 2000–01
- Sylvain Marveaux – Newcastle United – 2011–14
- Han-Noah Massengo – Burnley – 2023–24
- **Jean-Philippe Mateta** – **Crystal Palace** – 2020–
- Neal Maupay – Brighton & Hove Albion, Everton, Brentford – 2019–24
- Youl Mawéné – Derby County – 2000–02
- Benjamin Mendy – Manchester City – 2017–22
- Bernard Mendy – Bolton Wanderers, Hull City – 2002–03, 2008–10
- Illan Meslier – Leeds United - 2020-23
- **Dayann Methalie** – **Sunderland** – 2026–
- Anthony Modeste – Blackburn Rovers – 2011–12
- Lys Mousset – Bournemouth, Sheffield United – 2016–21
- Steven Mouyokolo – Hull City, Wolverhampton Wanderers – 2009–11
- **Nordi Mukiele** – **Sunderland** – 2025–
- Yann M'Vila – Sunderland – 2015–16
- Christian Nadé – Sheffield United – 2006–07
- Lilian Nalis – Leicester City – 2003–04
- Samir Nasri – Arsenal, Manchester City, West Ham United – 2008–17, 2018–19
- Tanguy Ndombele – Tottenham Hotspur – 2019–22
- Christian Negouai – Manchester City – 2004–05
- David Ngog – Liverpool, Bolton Wanderers, Swansea City – 2008–12, 2013–14
- Bruno Ngotty – Bolton Wanderers – 2001–06
- Niels Nkounkou – Everton – 2020–21
- Christopher Nkunku – Chelsea – 2023–25
- Charles N'Zogbia – Newcastle United, Wigan Athletic, Aston Villa – 2004–13, 2014–16
- Steven Nzonzi – Blackburn Rovers, Stoke City – 2009–15
- Gabriel Obertan – Manchester United, Newcastle United – 2009–16
- **Wilson Odobert** – Burnley, **Tottenham Hotspur** – 2023–
- Michael Olise – Crystal Palace – 2021–24
- Noé Pamarot – Tottenham Hotspur, Portsmouth – 2004–09
- Dimitri Payet – West Ham United – 2015–17
- Lionel Pérez – Sunderland – 1996–97
- Sébastien Pérez – Blackburn Rovers – 1998–99
- Vincent Péricard – Portsmouth, Stoke City – 2003–04, 2005–06, 2008–09
- Romain Perraud – Southampton – 2021–23
- Emmanuel Petit – Arsenal, Chelsea – 1997–2000, 2001–04
- Jérémy Pied – Southampton – 2016–18
- Frédéric Piquionne – Portsmouth, West Ham United – 2009–11
- Robert Pires – Arsenal, Aston Villa – 2000–06, 2010–11
- Damien Plessis – Liverpool – 2007–09
- Paul Pogba – Manchester United – 2011–12, 2016–22
- William Prunier – Manchester United – 1995–96
- Sébastien Puygrenier – Bolton Wanderers – 2008–09
- Franck Queudrue – Middlesbrough, Fulham, Birmingham City – 2001–08, 2009–10
- Loïc Rémy – Queens Park Rangers, Newcastle United, Chelsea, Crystal Palace – 2012–17
- Anthony Réveillère – Sunderland – 2014–15
- Emmanuel Rivière – Newcastle United – 2014–16
- Laurent Robert – Newcastle United, Portsmouth, Derby County – 2001–06, 2007–08
- Bruno Rodriguez – Bradford City – 1999–2000
- Franck Rolling – Leicester City – 1996–97
- Eric Roy – Sunderland – 1999–2001
- **Georginio Rutter** – Leeds United, **Brighton & Hove Albion** – 2022–23, 2024–
- Bacary Sagna – Arsenal, Manchester City – 2007–17
- Yaya Sanogo – Arsenal, Crystal Palace – 2013–15
- Louis Saha – Newcastle United, Fulham, Manchester United, Everton, Tottenham Hotspur, Sunderland – 1998–99, 2001–13
- Allan Saint-Maximin – Newcastle United – 2019–23
- Mamadou Sakho – Liverpool, Crystal Palace – 2013–21
- **William Saliba** – **Arsenal** – 2022–
- Morgan Sanson – Aston Villa – 2020–23
- Sébastien Schemmel – West Ham United, Portsmouth – 2000–04
- Morgan Schneiderlin – Southampton, Manchester United, Everton – 2012–20
- Antoine Sibierski – Manchester City, Newcastle United, Wigan Athletic – 2003–09
- Djibril Sidibé – Everton – 2019–20
- Mikaël Silvestre – Manchester United, Arsenal – 1999–2010
- Florent Sinama Pongolle – Liverpool, Blackburn Rovers – 2003–06
- Moussa Sissoko – Newcastle United, Tottenham Hotspur, Watford – 2012–22
- David Sommeil – Manchester City, Sheffield United – 2002–07
- Boubakary Soumaré – Leicester City – 2021–23, 2024–25
- Sébastien Squillaci – Arsenal – 2010–12
- Benjamin Stambouli – Tottenham Hotspur – 2014–15
- Ludovic Sylvestre – Blackpool – 2010–11
- **Loum Tchaouna** – Burnley, **Coventry City** – 2025–
- Allan Tchaptchet – Southampton – 2020–21
- **Mathys Tel** – **Tottenham Hotspur** – 2024–
- David Terrier – West Ham United – 1997–98
- Florian Thauvin – Newcastle United – 2015–16
- Kévin Théophile-Catherine – Cardiff City – 2013–14
- Jean-Clair Todibo – West Ham United – 2024–26
- **Adrien Truffert** – **Bournemouth** – 2025–
- Lesley Ugochukwu – Chelsea, Southampton, Burnley – 2023–26
- Patrick Valéry – Blackburn Rovers – 1997–98
- Raphaël Varane – Manchester United – 2021–24
- **Robinio Vaz** – **Hull City** – 2026–
- Jordan Veretout – Aston Villa – 2015–16
- Patrick Vieira – Arsenal, Manchester City – 1996–2005, 2009–11
- Grégory Vignal – Liverpool, Portsmouth, Birmingham City – 2000–03, 2005–06, 2009–10
- Jean-Guy Wallemme – Coventry City – 1998–99
- Sylvain Wiltord – Arsenal – 2000–04
- Mapou Yanga-Mbiwa – Newcastle United – 2012–14
- **Leny Yoro** – **Manchester United** – 2024–
- Kurt Zouma – Chelsea, Stoke City, Everton, West Ham United – 2014–24
- Ronald Zubar – Wolverhampton Wanderers – 2009–12

=== Georgia (Georgia (country)) ===
- Rati Aleksidze – Chelsea – 2000–01
- Mikhail Kavelashvili – Manchester City – 1995–96
- Temuri Ketsbaia – Newcastle United – 1997–2000
- Zurab Khizanishvili – Blackburn Rovers – 2005–09
- Georgi Kinkladze (**102**) – Manchester City, Derby County – 1995–96, 1999–2002
- **Giorgi Mamardashvili** – **Liverpool** – 2025–

=== Germany ===
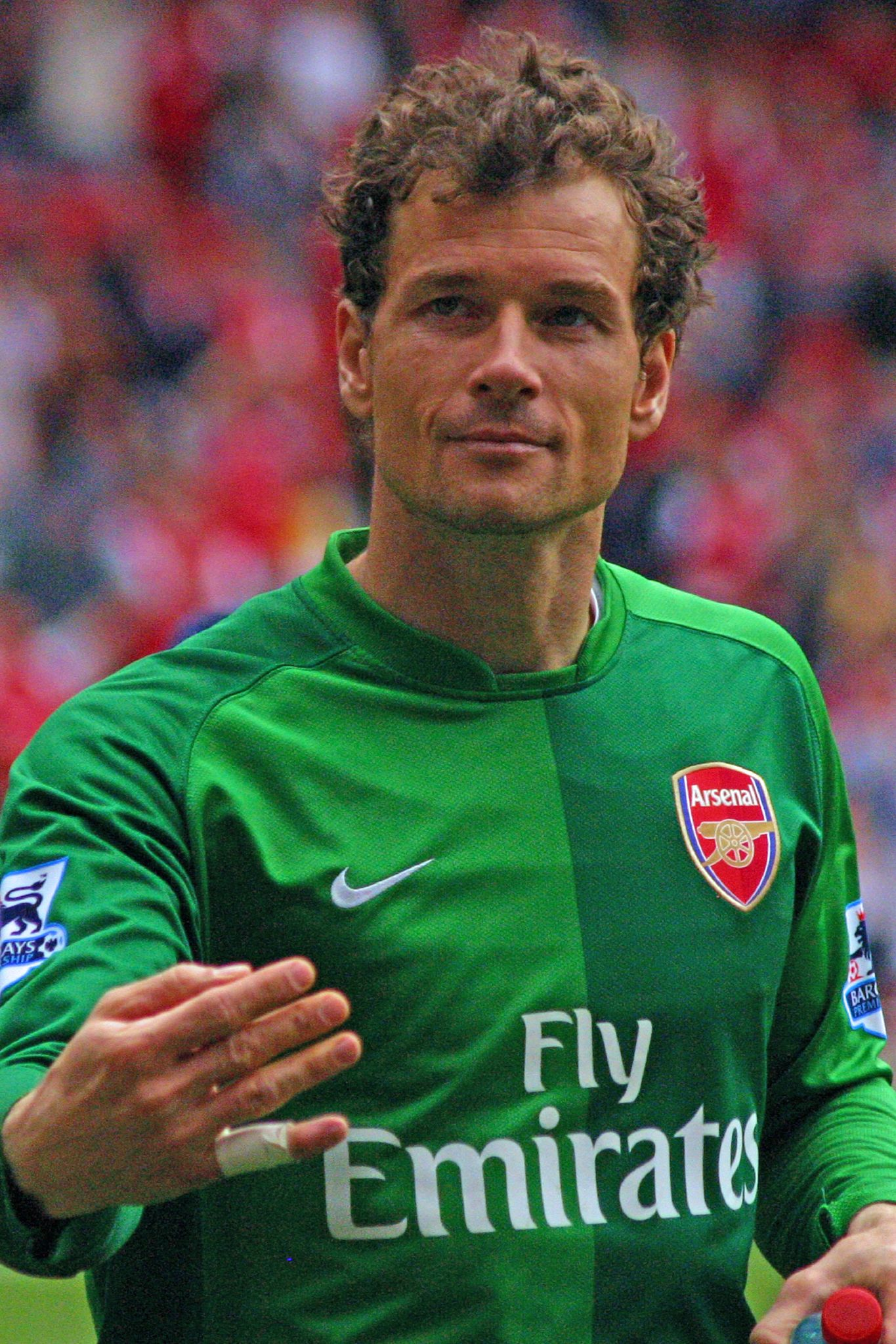
Jens Lehmann, goalkeeper for Arsenal during their undefeated season in 2003–04

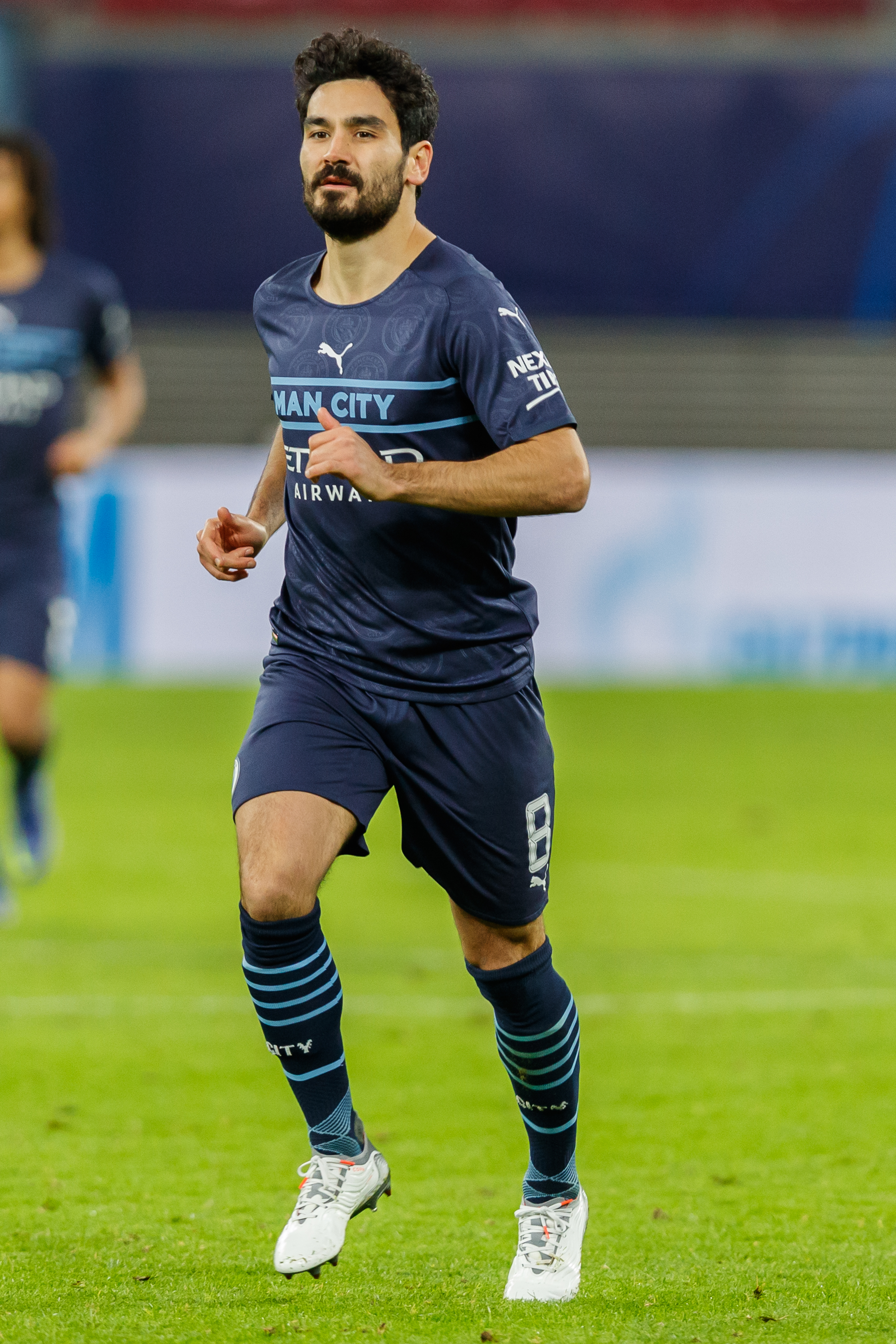
İlkay Gündoğan won five Premier League titles with Manchester City

- Markus Babbel – Liverpool, Blackburn Rovers – 2000–04
- Michael Ballack – Chelsea – 2006–10
- Stefan Beinlich – Aston Villa – 1992–94
- Armel Bella-Kotchap – Southampton – 2022–23, 2024–25
- Jordan Beyer – Burnley – 2023–24
- Jérôme Boateng – Manchester City – 2010–11
- Fredi Bobic – Bolton Wanderers – 2001–02
- Matthias Breitkreutz – Aston Villa – 1992–94
- Emre Can – Liverpool – 2014–18
- Eric da Silva Moreira – Nottingham Forest – 2024–25
- Sean Dundee – Liverpool – 1998–99
- Erik Durm – Huddersfield Town – 2018–19
- Ralf Fährmann – Norwich City – 2019–20
- Steffen Freund – Tottenham Hotspur, Leicester City – 1998–2004
- Michael Frontzeck – Manchester City – 1995–96
- Niclas Füllkrug – West Ham United – 2024–26
- Maurizio Gaudino – Manchester City – 1994–95
- Serge Gnabry – Arsenal, West Bromwich Albion – 2012–14, 2015–16
- **Leon Goretzka** – **Aston Villa** – 2026–
- **Pascal Groß** – **Brighton & Hove Albion** – 2017–24, 2025–
- Brajan Gruda – Brighton & Hove Albion – 2024–26
- İlkay Gündoğan – Manchester City – 2016–23, 2024–25
- Dietmar Hamann – Newcastle United, Liverpool, Manchester City – 1998–2009
- **Kai Havertz** – Chelsea, **Arsenal** – 2020–
- Michael Hefele – Huddersfield Town – 2017–18
- Thomas Helmer – Sunderland – 1999–2000
- Thomas Hitzlsperger – Aston Villa, West Ham United, Everton – 2000–05, 2010–11, 2012–13
- Lewis Holtby – Tottenham Hotspur, Fulham – 2012–15
- Uwe Hünemeier – Brighton & Hove Albion – 2017–18
- Robert Huth (**322**) – Chelsea, Middlesbrough, Stoke City, Leicester City – 2001–17
- Eike Immel – Manchester City – 1995–96
- Vitaly Janelt – Brentford – 2021–25
- Loris Karius – Liverpool, Newcastle United – 2016–18, 2023–24
- Steffen Karl – Manchester City – 1993–94
- Thilo Kehrer – West Ham United – 2022–24
- Jan Kirchhoff – Sunderland – 2015–17
- Jürgen Klinsmann – Tottenham Hotspur – 1994–95, 1997–98
- Robin Koch – Leeds United – 2020–23
- Lars Leese – Barnsley – 1997–98
- Jens Lehmann – Arsenal – 2003–08, 2010–11
- Moritz Leitner – Norwich City – 2019–20
- **Bernd Leno** – Arsenal, **Fulham** – 2018–
- Chris Löwe – Huddersfield Town – 2017–19
- Stefan Malz – Arsenal – 1999–2001
- Marko Marin – Chelsea – 2012–13
- Alberto Méndez – Arsenal – 1997–99
- Per Mertesacker – Arsenal – 2011–18
- Max Meyer – Crystal Palace – 2018–20
- Shkodran Mustafi – Arsenal – 2016–21
- **Luca Netz** – **Nottingham Forest** – 2025–
- **Lukas Nmecha** – Manchester City, **Leeds United** – 2017–18, 2025–
- Savio Nsereko – West Ham United – 2008–09
- **Stefan Ortega** – Manchester City, **Nottingham Forest** – 2022–
- Mesut Özil – Arsenal – 2013–20
- Sergio Peter – Blackburn Rovers – 2005–07
- Lukas Podolski – Arsenal – 2012–15
- Nick Proschwitz – Hull City – 2013–14
- Collin Quaner – Huddersfield Town – 2017–19
- Karl-Heinz Riedle – Liverpool – 1997–2000
- Sascha Riether – Fulham – 2012–14
- **Merlin Röhl** – **Everton** – 2025–
- Uwe Rösler – Manchester City, Southampton – 1993–96, 2000–02
- Antonio Rüdiger – Chelsea – 2017–22
- Lukas Rupp – Norwich City – 2019–20, 2021–22
- Leroy Sané – Manchester City – 2016–19
- **Kevin Schade** – **Brentford** – 2022–
- Christopher Schindler – Huddersfield Town – 2017–19
- Stefan Schnoor – Derby County – 1998–2001
- André Schürrle – Chelsea, Fulham – 2013–15, 2018–19
- Bastian Schweinsteiger – Manchester United – 2015–16
- Lennard Sowah – Portsmouth – 2009–10
- Dennis Srbeny – Norwich City – 2019–20
- **Anton Stach** – **Leeds United** – 2025–
- Marco Stiepermann – Norwich City – 2019–20
- Michael Tarnat – Manchester City – 2003–04
- **Malick Thiaw** – **Newcastle United** – 2025–
- Gerhard Tremmel – Swansea City – 2011–15
- Tom Trybull – Norwich City – 2019–20
- Deniz Undav – Brighton & Hove Albion – 2022–23
- Moritz Volz – Fulham – 2003–08
- Max Weiß – Burnley – 2025–26
- Timo Werner – Chelsea, Tottenham Hotspur – 2020–22, 2023–25
- Stefan Wessels – Everton – 2007–08
- **Florian Wirtz** – **Liverpool** – 2025–
- Philipp Wollscheid – Stoke City – 2014–17
- Nick Woltemade – Newcastle United – 2025–27
- Christian Ziege – Middlesbrough, Liverpool, Tottenham Hotspur – 1999–2004
- Ron-Robert Zieler – Leicester City – 2016–17
- Christoph Zimmermann – Norwich City – 2019–20, 2021–22

=== Gibraltar ===
- Danny Higginbotham (**210**) – Manchester United, Derby County, Southampton, Sunderland, Stoke City – 1999–2005, 2007–12

=== Greece ===
- George Baldock – Sheffield United – 2019–21, 2023–24
- Angelos Basinas – Portsmouth – 2008–10
- Vasilios Borbokis – Derby County – 1998–2000
- Kostas Chalkias – Portsmouth – 2004–05
- Nikos Dabizas (**148**) – Newcastle United, Leicester City – 1997–2004
- Georgios Donis – Blackburn Rovers – 1996–97
- Theofanis Gekas – Portsmouth – 2008–09
- Georgios Georgiadis – Newcastle United – 1998–99
- Stelios Giannakopoulos – Bolton Wanderers, Hull City – 2003–09
- Dimitris Giannoulis – Norwich City – 2021–22
- José Holebas – Watford – 2015–20
- Giorgos Karagounis – Fulham – 2012–14
- Orestis Karnezis – Watford – 2017–18
- Kostas Konstantinidis – Bolton Wanderers – 2001–02
- **Charalampos Kostoulas** – **Brighton & Hove Albion** – 2025–
- Sotirios Kyrgiakos – Liverpool, Sunderland – 2009–12
- Vasilios Lakis – Crystal Palace – 2004–05
- Charalampos Mavrias – Sunderland – 2013–14
- Konstantinos Mavropanos – Arsenal, West Ham United – 2017–19, 2023–26
- Kostas Mitroglou – Fulham – 2013–14
- Vangelis Moras – Swansea City – 2011–12
- **Christos Mouzakitis** – **Hull City** – 2026–
- Sokratis Papastathopoulos – Arsenal – 2018–20
- Georgios Samaras – Manchester City, West Bromwich Albion – 2005–08, 2014–15
- Giannis Skopelitis – Portsmouth – 2004–06
- Kostas Stafylidis – Stoke City – 2017–18
- Stathis Tavlaridis – Arsenal – 2002–03
- Kostas Tsimikas – Liverpool – 2020–25
- **Stefanos Tzimas** – **Brighton & Hove Albion** – 2025–
- **Konstantinos Tzolakis** – **Hull City** – 2026–
- **Christos Tzolis** – Norwich City, **Arsenal** – 2021–22, 2026–
- Apostolos Vellios – Everton – 2010–13
- Odysseas Vlachodimos – Nottingham Forest – 2023–24
- Theodoros Zagorakis – Leicester City – 1997–2000

=== Hungary ===
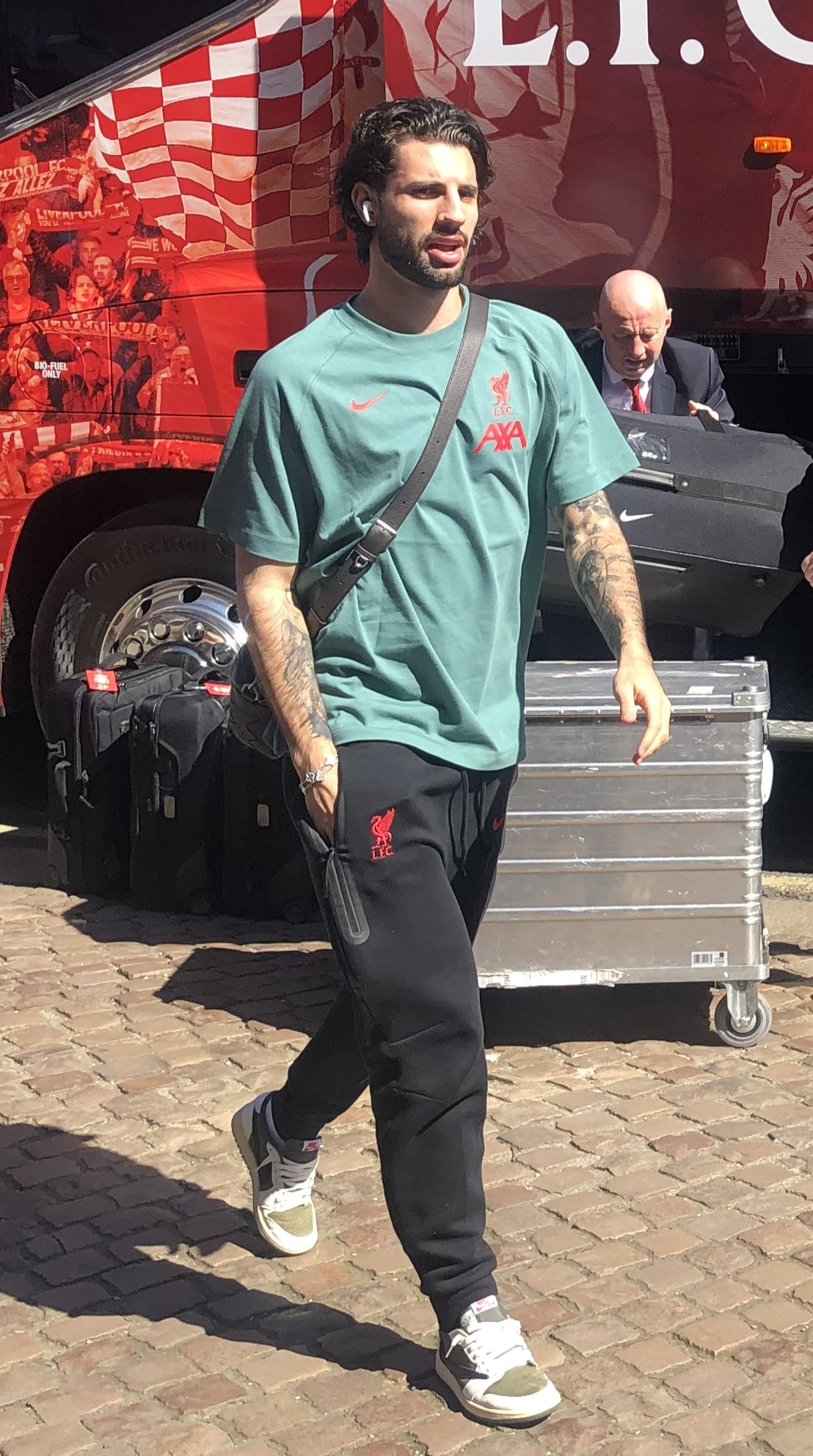
Dominik Szoboszlai won the Premier League with Liverpool in 2025

- Ádám Bogdán – Bolton Wanderers, Liverpool – 2010–12, 2015–16
- Ákos Buzsáky – Queens Park Rangers – 2011–12
- Márton Fülöp – Sunderland, Manchester City, West Bromwich Albion – 2007–10, 2011–12
- Zoltán Gera (**172**) – West Bromwich Albion, Fulham – 2004–06, 2008–14
- Péter Halmosi – Hull City – 2008–09
- **Milos Kerkez** – Bournemouth, **Liverpool** – 2023–
- Gábor Király – Crystal Palace, Aston Villa – 2004–05, 2006–07
- István Kozma – Liverpool – 1992–93
- Péter Kurucz – West Ham United – 2009–10
- Tamás Priskin – Watford – 2006–07
- **Dominik Szoboszlai** – **Liverpool** – 2023–
- Sándor Torghelle – Crystal Palace – 2004–05
- **Alex Tóth** – **Bournemouth** – 2025–

=== Iceland ===
- Guðni Bergsson – Tottenham Hotspur, Bolton Wanderers – 1992–93, 1995–96, 1997–98, 2001–03
- Eiður Guðjohnsen – Chelsea, Tottenham Hotspur, Stoke City, Fulham – 2000–06, 2009–11
- Joey Guðjónsson – Aston Villa, Wolverhampton Wanderers, Burnley – 2002–04, 2009–10
- Þórður Guðjónsson – Derby County – 2000–01
- Jóhann Berg Guðmundsson – Burnley – 2016–22, 2023–24
- Jóhann Birnir Guðmundsson – Watford – 1999–2000
- Aron Gunnarsson – Cardiff City – 2013–14, 2018–19
- Brynjar Gunnarsson – Reading – 2006–08
- Arnar Gunnlaugsson – Bolton Wanderers, Leicester City – 1997–2002
- Heiðar Helguson – Watford, Fulham, Bolton Wanderers, Queens Park Rangers – 1999–2000, 2005–09, 2011–12
- Hermann Hreiðarsson (**332**) – Crystal Palace, Wimbledon, Ipswich Town, Charlton Athletic, Portsmouth – 1997–98, 1999–2002, 2003–10
- Ívar Ingimarsson – Reading – 2006–08
- Eggert Jónsson – Wolverhampton Wanderers – 2011–12
- Þorvaldur Örlygsson – Nottingham Forest – 1992–93
- Rúnar Alex Rúnarsson – Arsenal – 2020–21
- Gylfi Sigurðsson – Swansea City, Tottenham Hotspur, Everton – 2011–21
- Lárus Sigurðsson – West Bromwich Albion – 2002–03
- Grétar Steinsson – Bolton Wanderers – 2007–12
- **Hákon Valdimarsson** – **Brentford** – 2024–

=== Israel ===
- Walid Badir – Wimbledon – 1999–2000
- Yossi Benayoun (**194**) – West Ham United, Liverpool, Chelsea, Arsenal – 2005–13
- Tal Ben Haim – Bolton Wanderers, Chelsea, Manchester City, Sunderland, Portsmouth, West Ham United, Queens Park Rangers – 2004–11, 2012–13
- Eyal Berkovic – Southampton, West Ham United, Manchester City, Portsmouth – 1996–99, 2002–05
- Tamir Cohen – Bolton Wanderers – 2007–11
- Najwan Ghrayib – Aston Villa – 1999–2000
- Tomer Hemed – Brighton & Hove Albion – 2017–18
- Yaniv Katan – West Ham United – 2005–06
- Beram Kayal – Brighton & Hove Albion – 2017–19
- Dekel Keinan – Blackpool – 2010–11
- **Anan Khalaili** – **Crystal Palace** – 2026–
- Avi Nimni – Derby County – 1999–2000
- Ronny Rosenthal – Liverpool, Tottenham Hotspur – 1992–97
- Ben Sahar – Chelsea – 2006–07
- Itay Shechter – Swansea City – 2012–13
- Manor Solomon – Fulham, Tottenham Hotspur – 2022–24
- Idan Tal – Everton, Bolton Wanderers – 2000–02, 2006–07
- Itzik Zohar – Crystal Palace – 1997–98

=== Italy ===
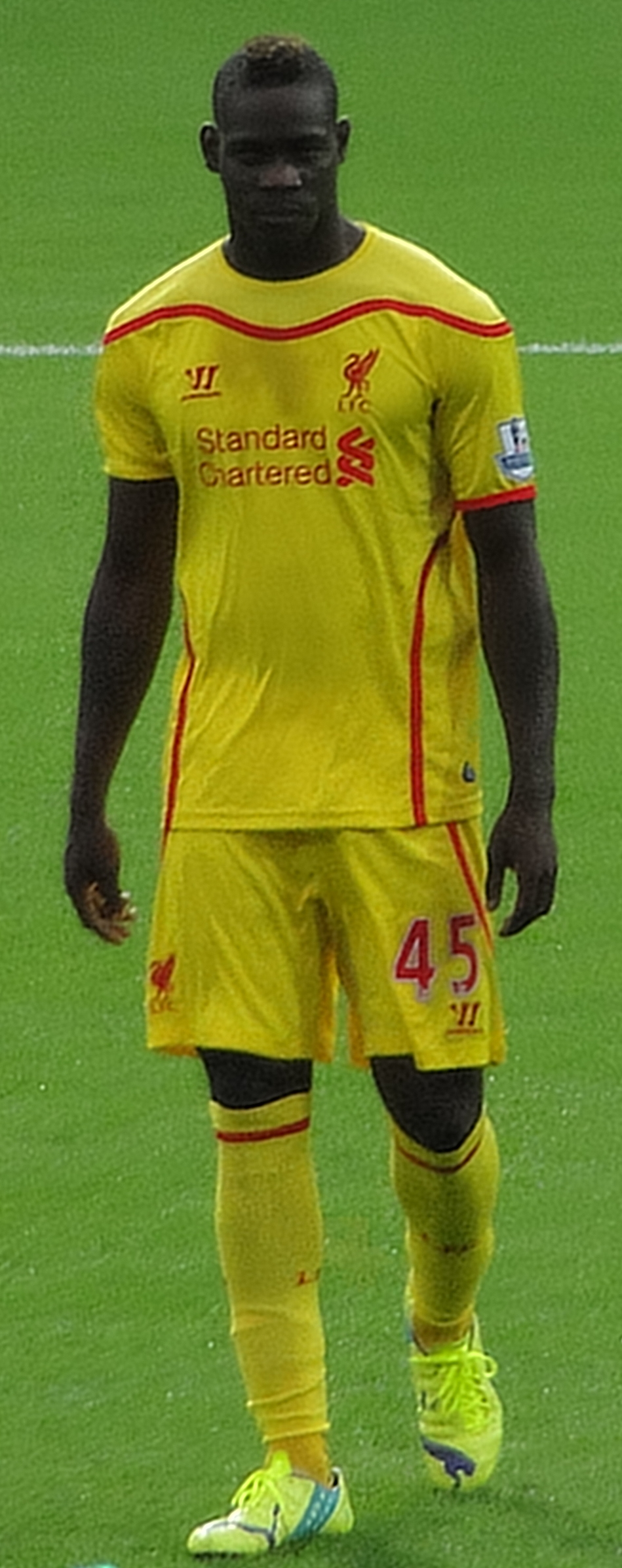
Mario Balotelli is the first Italian to win the Premier League, doing so with Manchester City in 2012

- **Honest Ahanor** – **Crystal Palace** – 2026–
- Gabriele Ambrosetti – Chelsea – 1999–2000
- Marco Ambrosio – Chelsea – 2003–04
- Lorenzo Amoruso – Blackburn Rovers – 2003–05
- Alberto Aquilani – Liverpool – 2009–10
- Dino Baggio – Blackburn Rovers – 2003–04
- Francesco Baiano – Derby County – 1997–2000
- Mario Balotelli – Manchester City, Liverpool – 2010–13, 2014–15
- Antonio Barreca – Newcastle United – 2018–19
- Nicola Berti – Tottenham Hotspur – 1997–99
- Rolando Bianchi – Manchester City – 2007–08
- Patrizio Billio – Crystal Palace – 1997–98
- Ivano Bonetti – Crystal Palace – 1997–98
- Fabio Borini – Chelsea, Liverpool, Sunderland – 2009–10, 2012–17
- Marco Borriello – West Ham United – 2013–14
- Marco Branca – Middlesbrough – 1998–99
- **Riccardo Calafiori** – **Arsenal** – 2024–
- Benito Carbone – Sheffield Wednesday, Aston Villa, Bradford City, Derby County, Middlesbrough – 1996–2002
- Cesare Casadei – Chelsea – 2023–24
- Pierluigi Casiraghi – Chelsea – 1998–99
- **Federico Chiesa** – **Liverpool** – 2024–
- Diego Coppola – Brighton & Hove Albion – 2025–26
- Bernardo Corradi – Manchester City – 2006–07
- Carlo Cudicini – Chelsea, Tottenham Hotspur – 1999–2011
- Patrick Cutrone – Wolverhampton Wanderers – 2019–21
- Daniele Daino – Derby County – 2001–02
- Samuele Dalla Bona – Chelsea – 1999–2002
- Matteo Darmian – Manchester United – 2015–19
- Paolo Di Canio – Sheffield Wednesday, West Ham United, Charlton Athletic – 1997–2004
- Roberto Di Matteo – Chelsea – 1996–2001
- David Di Michele – West Ham United – 2008–09
- Alessandro Diamanti – West Ham United, Watford – 2008–10, 2015–16
- **Gianluigi Donnarumma** – **Manchester City** – 2025–
- Andrea Dossena – Liverpool, Sunderland – 2008–10, 2013–14
- Emerson – Chelsea, West Ham United – 2017–25
- Stefano Eranio – Derby County – 1997–2001
- Matteo Ferrari – Everton – 2005–06
- Gianluca Festa – Middlesbrough – 1996–97, 1998–2002
- Manolo Gabbiadini – Southampton – 2016–19
- Emanuele Giaccherini – Sunderland – 2013–15
- Stefano Gioacchini – Coventry City – 1998–99
- Wilfried Gnonto – Leeds United – 2022–23, 2025–26
- Corrado Grabbi – Blackburn Rovers – 2001–04
- Jorginho – Chelsea, Arsenal – 2018–25
- **Michael Kayode** – **Brentford** – 2024–
- Moise Kean – Everton – 2019–22
- Luca Koleosho – Burnley – 2023–24
- Attilio Lombardo – Crystal Palace – 1997–98
- Lorenzo Lucca – Nottingham Forest – 2025–26
- Arturo Lupoli – Arsenal – 2005–06
- Massimo Maccarone – Middlesbrough – 2002–04, 2005–07
- Federico Macheda – Manchester United, Queens Park Rangers – 2008–12
- Roberto Mancini – Leicester City – 2000–01
- Vito Mannone – Arsenal, Sunderland – 2008–10, 2012–17
- Dario Marcolin – Blackburn Rovers – 1998–99
- Marco Materazzi – Everton – 1998–99
- Vincenzo Montella – Fulham – 2006–07
- Antonio Nocerino – West Ham United – 2013–14
- Angelo Ogbonna – West Ham United – 2015–24
- Stefano Okaka – Fulham, Watford – 2009–10, 2016–19
- Caleb Okoli – Leicester City – 2024–25
- Dani Osvaldo – Southampton – 2013–15
- Daniele Padelli – Liverpool – 2006–07
- Michele Padovano – Crystal Palace – 1997–98
- **Marco Palestra** – **Chelsea** – 2026–
- Gabriel Paletta – Liverpool – 2006–07
- Alberto Paloschi – Swansea City – 2015–16
- Christian Panucci – Chelsea – 2000–01
- Graziano Pellè – Southampton – 2014–16
- Alessandro Pistone – Newcastle United, Everton – 1997–2006
- Rodrigo Possebon – Manchester United – 2008–09
- Andrea Ranocchia – Hull City – 2016–17
- Fabrizio Ravanelli – Middlesbrough, Derby County – 1996–97, 2001–02
- Giuseppe Rossi – Manchester United, Newcastle United – 2005–07
- **Matteo Ruggeri** – **Aston Villa** – 2026–
- Francesco Sanetti – Sheffield Wednesday – 1997–99
- Davide Santon – Newcastle United – 2011–14
- **Nicolò Savona** – **Nottingham Forest** – 2025–
- Gianluca Scamacca – West Ham United – 2022–23
- Ezequiel Schelotto – Brighton & Hove Albion – 2017–18, 2019–20
- Matteo Sereni – Ipswich Town – 2001–02
- Andrea Silenzi – Nottingham Forest – 1995–97
- Massimo Taibi – Manchester United – 1999–2000
- **Sandro Tonali** – Newcastle United, **Tottenham Hotspur** – 2023–
- Paolo Tramezzani – Tottenham Hotspur – 1998–99
- Marcello Trotta – Fulham – 2011–12
- **Destiny Udogie** – **Tottenham Hotspur** – 2023–
- Nicola Ventola – Crystal Palace – 2004–05
- Gianluca Vialli – Chelsea – 1996–99
- Guglielmo Vicario – Tottenham Hotspur – 2023–26
- Nicolò Zaniolo – Aston Villa – 2023–24
- Davide Zappacosta – Chelsea – 2017–19
- Simone Zaza – West Ham United – 2016–17
- Gianfranco Zola (**229**) – Chelsea – 1996–2003

=== Kosovo ===
- Bersant Celina – Manchester City – 2015–16
- Florent Hadergjonaj (**47**) – Huddersfield Town – 2017–19
- Arijanet Muric – Burnley, Ipswich Town – 2023–25
- Milot Rashica – Norwich City – 2021–22

=== Latvia ===
- Imants Bleidelis – Southampton – 2000–02
- Dennis Cirkin – Sunderland – 2025–26
- Kaspars Gorkšs – Reading – 2012–13
- Marians Pahars (**129**) – Southampton – 1998–2004
- Igors Stepanovs – Arsenal – 2000–03
- Andrejs Štolcers – Fulham – 2001–03

=== Lithuania ===
- Giedrius Arlauskis – Watford – 2015–16
- Tomas Danilevičius (**2**) – Arsenal – 2000–01

=== Luxembourg ===
- **Brian Madjo** (**1**) – Aston Villa – 2026–

=== Malta ===
- Dylan Kerr (**5**) – Leeds United – 1992–93

=== Montenegro ===
- Stevan Jovetić (**30**) – Manchester City – 2013–15
- Stefan Savić – Manchester City – 2011–12
- Simon Vukčević – Blackburn Rovers – 2011–12
- Elsad Zverotić – Fulham – 2013–14

=== Netherlands ===
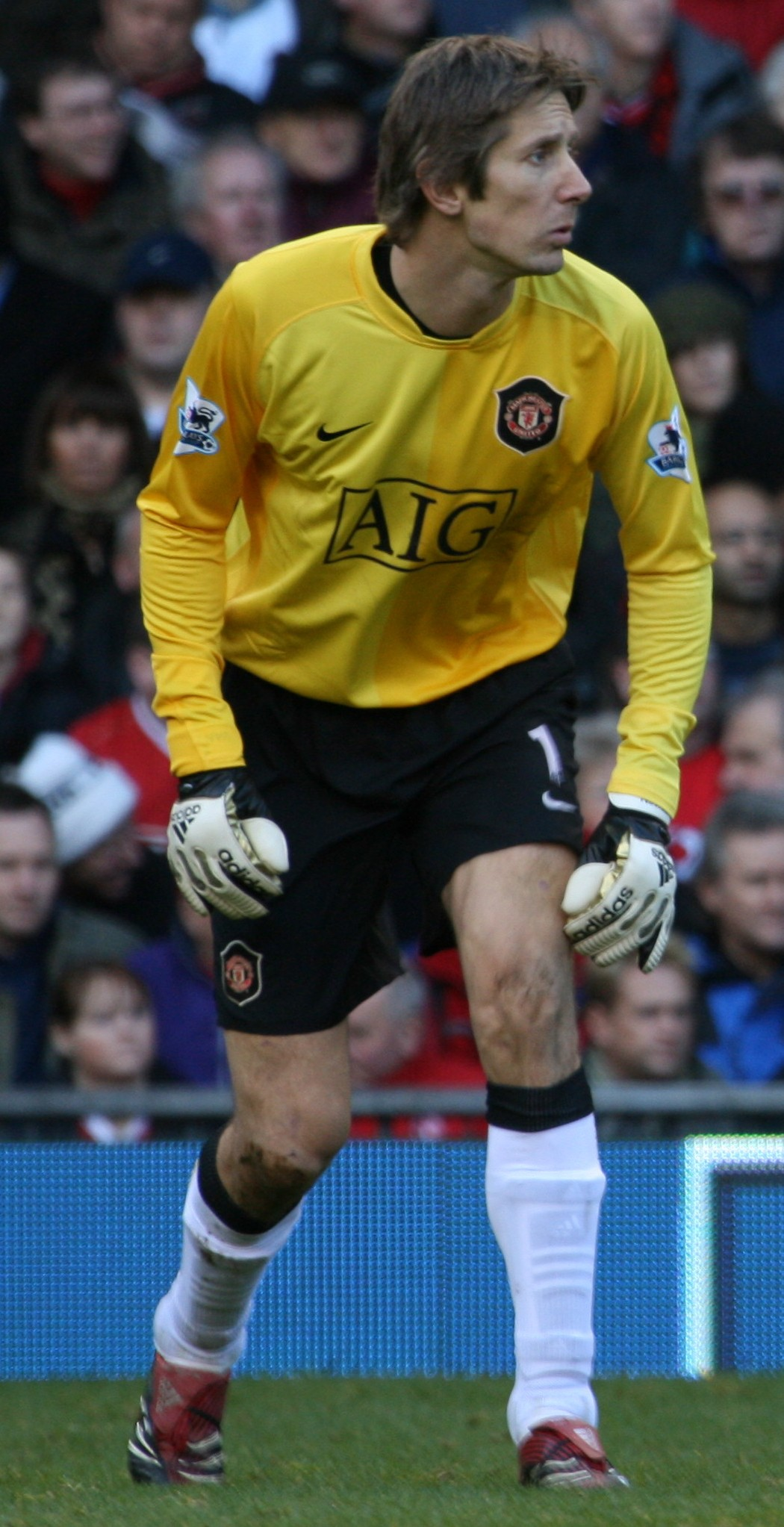
Edwin van der Sar is the holder of the record for the longest Premier League clean sheet streak, while playing for Manchester United

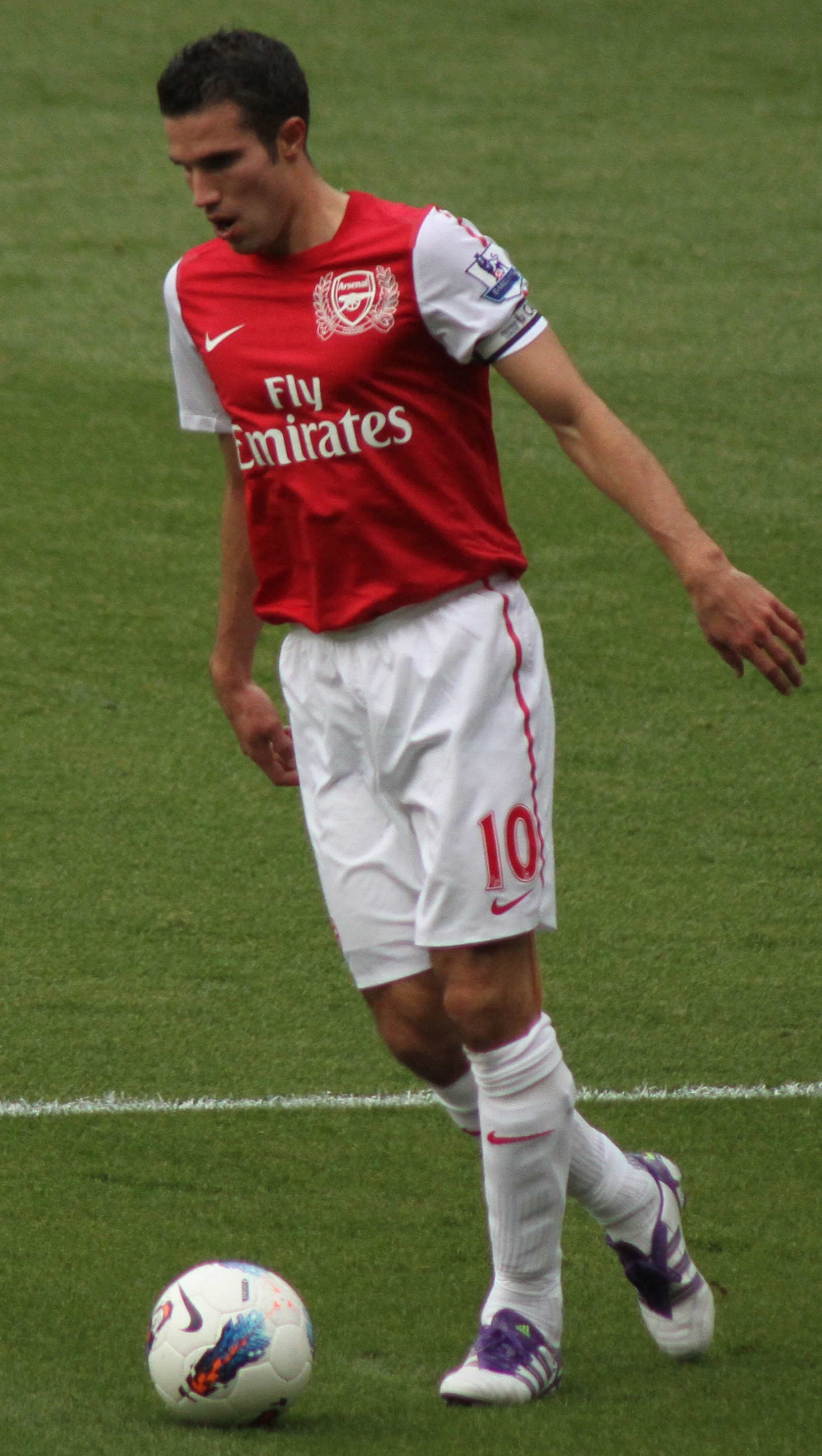
Robin van Persie was Premier League top scorer in two consecutive seasons for two different clubs – Arsenal and Manchester United

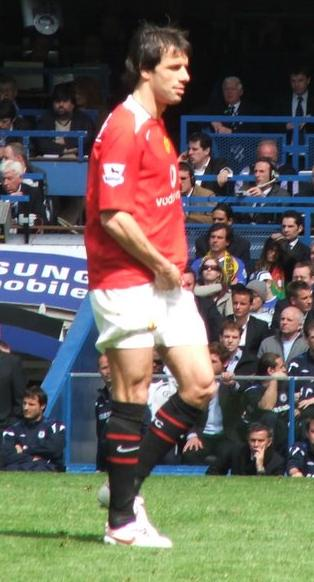
Ruud van Nistelrooy was the top scorer and Player of the Season in 2002–03

- Patrick van Aanholt – Chelsea, Wigan Athletic, Sunderland, Crystal Palace – 2009–10, 2011–12, 2014–21
- Nabil Abidallah – Ipswich Town – 2000–01
- Ibrahim Afellay – Stoke City – 2015–18
- Nathan Aké – Chelsea, Watford, Bournemouth, Manchester City – 2012–26
- Ryan Babel – Liverpool, Fulham – 2007–11, 2018–19
- Jaydon Banel – Burnley – 2025–26
- Donny van de Beek – Manchester United, Everton – 2020–24
- **Sepp van den Berg** – **Brentford** – 2024–
- Steven Berghuis – Watford – 2015–16
- Dennis Bergkamp – Arsenal – 1995–2006
- Steven Bergwijn – Tottenham Hotspur – 2019–22
- **Marco Bizot** – **Aston Villa** – 2025–
- Daley Blind – Manchester United – 2014–18
- Regi Blinker – Sheffield Wednesday – 1995–97
- George Boateng (**384**) – Coventry City, Aston Villa, Middlesbrough, Hull City – 1997–2010
- Jeroen Boere – West Ham United – 1993–96
- **Lamare Bogarde** – **Aston Villa** – 2024–
- Winston Bogarde – Chelsea – 2000–01
- Marco Boogers – West Ham United – 1995–96
- Paul Bosvelt – Manchester City – 2003–05
- **Sven Botman** – **Newcastle United** – 2022–
- Khalid Boulahrouz – Chelsea – 2006–07
- Wilfred Bouma – Aston Villa – 2005–08
- **Brian Brobbey** – **Sunderland** – 2025–
- Giovanni van Bronckhorst – Arsenal – 2001–03
- Jeffrey Bruma – Chelsea – 2009–11
- Alexander Büttner – Manchester United – 2012–14
- Jordy Clasie – Southampton – 2015–17
- Jordi Cruyff – Manchester United – 1996–2000
- Arnaut Danjuma – Bournemouth, Tottenham Hotspur, Everton – 2019–20, 2022–24
- Chris David – Fulham – 2013–14
- Edgar Davids – Tottenham Hotspur – 2005–07
- Memphis Depay – Manchester United – 2015–17
- **Virgil van Dijk** – Southampton, **Liverpool** – 2015–
- Sieb Dijkstra – Queens Park Rangers – 1994–95
- Royston Drenthe – Everton – 2011–12
- Anwar El Ghazi – Aston Villa, Everton – 2019–22
- Eljero Elia – Southampton – 2014–15
- Urby Emanuelson – Fulham – 2012–13
- **Emmanuel Emegha** – **Chelsea** – 2026–
- Marvin Emnes – Middlesbrough, Swansea City – 2008–09, 2013–16
- **Milan van Ewijk** – **Coventry City** – 2026–
- Leroy Fer – Norwich City, Queens Park Rangers, Swansea City – 2013–18
- Mark Flekken – Brentford – 2023–25
- **Zian Flemming** – Burnley, **Ipswich Town** – 2025–
- Timothy Fosu-Mensah – Manchester United, Crystal Palace, Fulham – 2015–21
- Fabian de Freitas – Bolton Wanderers – 1995–96
- **Jeremie Frimpong** – **Liverpool** – 2025–
- **Cody Gakpo** – **Liverpool** – 2022–
- **Lutsharel Geertruida** – **Sunderland** – 2025–
- Marco van Ginkel – Chelsea, Stoke City – 2013–14, 2015–16
- Ulrich van Gobbel – Southampton – 1996–98
- Ed de Goey – Chelsea – 1997–2003
- Raimond van der Gouw – Manchester United – 1996–2002
- **Ryan Gravenberch** – **Liverpool** – 2023–
- Alfons Groenendijk – Manchester City – 1993–94
- Ruud Gullit – Chelsea – 1995–98
- Jonathan de Guzmán – Swansea City – 2012–14
- **Gustavo Hamer** – Sheffield United, **Coventry City** – 2023–24, 2026–
- Quilindschy Hartman – Burnley – 2025–26
- Jimmy Floyd Hasselbaink – Leeds United, Chelsea, Middlesbrough, Charlton Athletic – 1997–99, 2000–07
- **Jorrel Hato** – **Chelsea** – 2025–
- **Jan Paul van Hecke** – Brighton & Hove Albion, **Tottenham Hotspur** – 2022–
- John Heitinga – Everton, Fulham – 2009–14
- Glenn Helder – Arsenal – 1994–97
- Laurens ten Heuvel – Barnsley – 1997–98
- Wesley Hoedt – Southampton – 2017–19
- Ki-Jana Hoever – Wolverhampton Wanderers – 2020–22, 2025–26
- Pierre van Hooijdonk – Nottingham Forest – 1996–97, 1998–99
- Jos Hooiveld – Southampton – 2012–14
- Mike van der Hoorn – Swansea City – 2016–18
- Daryl Janmaat – Newcastle United, Watford – 2014–20
- Vincent Janssen – Tottenham Hotspur – 2016–19
- Collins John – Fulham – 2003–08
- Luuk de Jong – Newcastle United – 2013–14
- Nigel de Jong – Manchester City – 2008–13
- Siem de Jong – Newcastle United – 2014–16
- Wim Jonk – Sheffield Wednesday – 1998–2000
- John Karelse – Newcastle United – 1999–2000
- Orpheo Keizerweerd – Oldham Athletic – 1992–93
- Davy Klaassen – Everton – 2017–18
- **Justin Kluivert** – **Bournemouth** – 2023–
- Patrick Kluivert – Newcastle United – 2004–05
- Terence Kongolo – Huddersfield Town, Fulham – 2017–19, 2020–21
- Willem Korsten – Leeds United, Tottenham Hotspur – 1998–2001
- Jan Kromkamp – Liverpool – 2005–06
- Tim Krul – Newcastle United, Norwich City – 2010–16, 2019–20, 2021–22
- Dirk Kuyt – Liverpool – 2006–12
- Robin van der Laan – Derby County – 1996–98
- Denny Landzaat – Wigan Athletic – 2006–08
- Rajiv van La Parra – Huddersfield Town – 2017–19
- Jeremain Lens – Sunderland – 2015–17
- **Matthijs de Ligt** – **Manchester United** – 2024–
- **Ian Maatsen** – Chelsea, **Aston Villa** – 2023–
- Sherjill MacDonald – West Bromwich Albion – 2008–09
- Tyrell Malacia – Manchester United – 2022–23, 2024–26
- Donyell Malen – Aston Villa – 2024–26
- Bruno Martins Indi – Stoke City – 2016–18
- **Azor Matusiwa** – **Ipswich Town** – 2026–
- Erik Meijer – Liverpool – 1999–2001
- Mario Melchiot – Chelsea, Birmingham City, Wigan Athletic – 1999–2006, 2007–09
- Andy van der Meyde – Everton – 2005–07, 2008–09
- **Antoni Milambo** – **Brentford** – 2025–
- Robert Molenaar – Leeds United, Bradford City – 1996–99, 2000–01
- Ken Monkou – Southampton – 1992–99
- Kiki Musampa – Manchester City – 2004–06
- Riga Mustapha – Bolton Wanderers – 2008–10
- Luciano Narsingh – Swansea City – 2016–18
- Luc Nijholt – Swindon Town – 1993–94
- Ruud van Nistelrooy – Manchester United – 2001–06
- André Ooijer – Blackburn Rovers – 2006–09
- Marc Overmars – Arsenal – 1997–2000
- Robin van Persie – Arsenal, Manchester United – 2004–15
- Bobby Petta – Fulham – 2003–04
- Erik Pieters – Stoke City, Burnley – 2013–18, 2019–22
- Stefan Postma – Aston Villa – 2002–05
- Davy Pröpper – Brighton & Hove Albion – 2017–21
- Tijjani Reijnders – Manchester City – 2025–26
- Michael Reiziger – Middlesbrough – 2004–06
- Karim Rekik – Manchester City – 2012–13
- Martijn Reuser – Ipswich Town – 2000–02
- Daniël de Ridder – Birmingham City, Wigan Athletic – 2007–09
- Jaïro Riedewald – Crystal Palace – 2017–18, 2019–24
- Maceo Rigters – Blackburn Rovers – 2007–08
- Arjen Robben – Chelsea – 2004–07
- **Robin Roefs** – **Sunderland** – 2025–
- Marten de Roon – Middlesbrough – 2016–17
- Bryan Roy – Nottingham Forest – 1994–97
- Edwin van der Sar – Fulham, Manchester United – 2001–11
- **Kjell Scherpen** – **Ipswich Town** – 2026–
- Jenson Seelt – Sunderland – 2025–26
- Hans Segers – Wimbledon, Tottenham Hotspur – 1992–96, 1998–99
- Gerald Sibon – Sheffield Wednesday – 1999–2000
- **Xavi Simons** – **Tottenham Hotspur** – 2025–
- Richard Sneekes – Bolton Wanderers – 1995–96
- Jaap Stam – Manchester United – 1998–2002
- Ronnie Stam – Wigan Athletic – 2010–13
- Maarten Stekelenburg – Fulham, Southampton, Everton – 2013–14, 2015–17
- **Sean Steur** – **Newcastle United** – 2026–
- **Pascal Struijk** – Leeds United, **Brighton & Hove Albion** – 2020–23, 2025–
- Crysencio Summerville – Leeds United, West Ham United – 2021–23, 2024–26
- **Kenny Tete** – **Fulham** – 2020–21, 2022–
- Dwight Tiendalli – Swansea City – 2012–15
- **Jurriën Timber** – **Arsenal** – 2023–
- **Quinten Timber** – **Crystal Palace** – 2026–
- Orlando Trustfull – Sheffield Wednesday – 1996–97
- Rafael van der Vaart – Tottenham Hotspur – 2010–13
- Joël Veltman – Brighton & Hove Albion – 2020–26
- **Micky van de Ven** – **Tottenham Hotspur** – 2023–
- Jan Vennegoor of Hesselink – Hull City – 2009–10
- **Bart Verbruggen** – **Brighton & Hove Albion** – 2023–
- Ron Vlaar – Aston Villa — 2012–15
- Michel Vonk – Manchester City – 1992–95
- Michel Vorm – Swansea City, Tottenham Hotspur – 2011–19
- Dorus de Vries – Wolverhampton Wanderers – 2011–12
- Harald Wapenaar – Portsmouth – 2003–04
- Wout Weghorst – Burnley, Manchester United – 2021–23
- Sander Westerveld – Liverpool, Portsmouth, Everton – 1999–2002, 2005–06
- **Mats Wieffer** – **Brighton & Hove Albion** – 2024–
- Gerard Wiekens – Manchester City – 2000–01, 2002–03
- Georginio Wijnaldum – Newcastle United, Liverpool – 2015–21
- Clyde Wijnhard – Leeds United – 1998–99
- Jetro Willems – Newcastle United – 2019–20
- Ron Willems – Derby County – 1996–98
- Fabian Wilnis – Ipswich Town – 2000–02
- Richard Witschge – Blackburn Rovers – 1994–95
- Ricky van Wolfswinkel – Norwich City – 2013–14
- Nordin Wooter – Watford – 1999–2000
- Marvin Zeegelaar – Watford – 2017–18
- Arjan de Zeeuw – Barnsley, Portsmouth, Wigan Athletic – 1997–98, 2003–07
- Boudewijn Zenden – Chelsea, Middlesbrough, Liverpool, Sunderland – 2001–07, 2009–11
- **Joshua Zirkzee** – **Manchester United** – 2024–
- Gianni Zuiverloon – West Bromwich Albion – 2008–09, 2010–11

=== North Macedonia ===
- Ezgjan Alioski (**36**) – Leeds United – 2020–21
- Georgi Hristov – Barnsley – 1997–98
- Goran Popov – West Bromwich Albion – 2012–14
- Artim Šakiri – West Bromwich Albion – 2004–05
- Goce Sedloski – Sheffield Wednesday – 1997–98

=== Norway ===
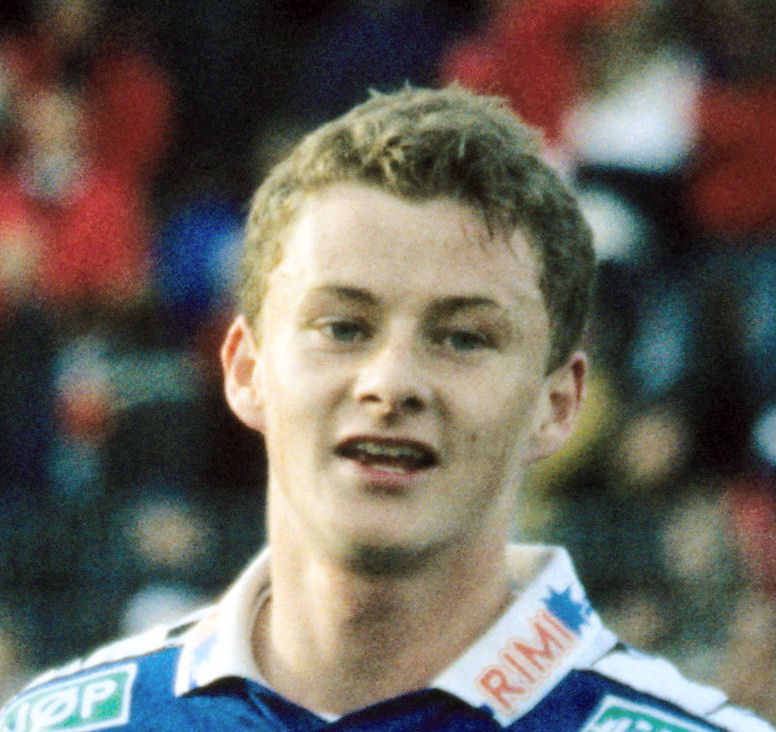
Ole Gunnar Solskjær won six Premier League titles for Manchester United, a record for a player from outside the British Isles

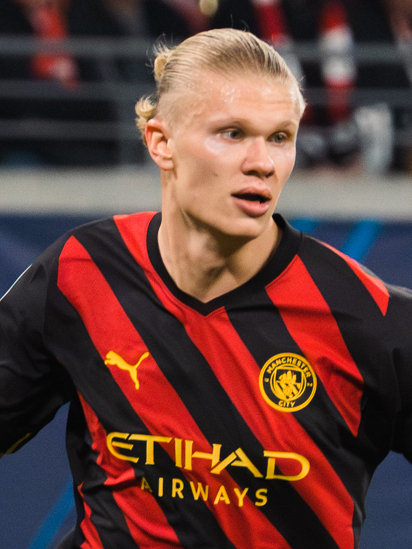
Erling Haaland scored a Premier League record 36 goals for Manchester City in the 2022–23 season

- **Kristoffer Ajer** – **Brentford** – 2021–
- Trond Andersen – Wimbledon – 1999–2000
- Martin Andresen – Wimbledon, Blackburn Rovers – 1999–2000, 2003–04
- Espen Baardsen – Tottenham Hotspur, Everton – 1996–99, 2002–03
- Eirik Bakke – Leeds United, Aston Villa – 1999–2004, 2005–06
- Henning Berg – Blackburn Rovers, Manchester United – 1992–2003
- **Sander Berge** – Sheffield United, Burnley, **Fulham** – 2019–21, 2023–
- Jo Inge Berget – Cardiff City – 2013–14
- Stig Inge Bjørnebye – Liverpool, Blackburn Rovers – 1992–99, 2001–02
- **Oscar Bobb** – Manchester City – **Fulham** – 2023–
- Lars Bohinen – Nottingham Forest, Blackburn Rovers, Derby County – 1994–2001
- Daniel Braaten – Bolton Wanderers – 2007–08
- Bjørn Otto Bragstad – Derby County – 2000–01
- John Carew – Aston Villa, Stoke City – 2006–11
- Mats Møller Dæhli – Cardiff City – 2013–14
- Adama Diomande – Hull City – 2016–17
- **Sindre Walle Egeli** – **Ipswich Town** – 2026–
- Magnus Wolff Eikrem – Cardiff City – 2013–14
- Omar Elabdellaoui – Hull City – 2016–17
- Mohamed Elyounoussi – Southampton – 2018–19, 2021–23
- Jan Åge Fjørtoft – Swindon Town, Middlesbrough, Barnsley – 1993–94, 1995–98
- Jostein Flo – Sheffield United – 1993–94
- Tore André Flo – Chelsea, Sunderland – 1997–2001, 2002–03
- Frode Grodås – Chelsea – 1996–97
- Alf-Inge Haaland – Nottingham Forest, Leeds United, Manchester City – 1994–2001
- **Erling Haaland** – **Manchester City** – 2022–
- Kristofer Hæstad – Wigan Athletic – 2006–07
- Erik Hagen – Wigan Athletic – 2007–08
- Gunnar Halle – Oldham Athletic, Leeds United, Bradford City – 1992–94, 1996–2001
- Brede Hangeland – Fulham, Crystal Palace – 2007–16
- Vegard Heggem – Liverpool – 1998–2001
- Markus Henriksen – Hull City – 2016–17
- Jon Olav Hjelde – Nottingham Forest – 1998–99
- Leo Hjelde – Leeds United – 2021–22
- **Jens Hjerto-Dahl** – **Hull City** – 2026–
- Abdisalam Ibrahim – Manchester City – 2009–10
- Kåre Ingebrigtsen – Manchester City – 1992–94
- Steffen Iversen – Tottenham Hotspur, Wolverhampton Wanderers – 1996–2004
- Stefan Johansen – Fulham – 2018–19
- Stig Johansen – Southampton – 1997–98
- Erland Johnsen – Chelsea – 1992–97
- Ronny Johnsen – Manchester United, Aston Villa, Newcastle United – 1996–2005
- Christian Kalvenes – Burnley – 2009–10
- Azar Karadas – Portsmouth – 2005–06
- Joshua King – Bournemouth, Everton, Watford – 2015–22
- Kristoffer Klaesson – Leeds United – 2021–22
- Bjørn Tore Kvarme – Liverpool – 1996–99
- **Jørgen Strand Larsen** – Wolverhampton Wanderers, **Crystal Palace** – 2024–
- Øyvind Leonhardsen – Wimbledon, Liverpool, Tottenham Hotspur, Aston Villa – 1994–2003
- Andreas Lund – Wimbledon – 1999–2000
- Claus Lundekvam – Southampton – 1996–2005
- Pål Lydersen – Arsenal – 1992–93
- Thomas Myhre – Everton, Sunderland, Charlton Athletic – 1997–2001, 2002–03, 2005–07
- Erik Nevland – Manchester United, Fulham – 1997–98, 2007–10
- Roger Nilsen – Sheffield United, Tottenham Hotspur – 1993–94, 1998–99
- Håvard Nordtveit – West Ham United, Fulham – 2016–17, 2018–19
- Mathias Normann – Norwich City – 2021–22
- Runar Normann – Coventry City – 1999–2000
- Ørjan Nyland – Aston Villa – 2019–20
- **Martin Ødegaard** – **Arsenal** – 2020–
- Egil Østenstad – Southampton, Manchester City, Blackburn Rovers – 1996–2003
- Jonathan Parr – Crystal Palace – 2013–14
- Morten Gamst Pedersen – Blackburn Rovers – 2004–12
- Tore Pedersen – Oldham Athletic, Blackburn Rovers, Wimbledon – 1993–94, 1997–98, 1999–2000
- Bjørn Helge Riise – Fulham – 2009–11
- John Arne Riise (**321**) – Liverpool, Fulham – 2001–08, 2011–14
- Petter Rudi – Sheffield Wednesday – 1997–2000
- Ståle Solbakken – Wimbledon – 1997–98
- Ole Gunnar Solskjær – Manchester United – 1996–2004, 2005–07
- Trond Egil Soltvedt – Coventry City, Southampton – 1997–2001
- Ragnvald Soma – West Ham United – 2000–02
- Alexander Sørloth – Crystal Palace – 2017–19
- Ståle Stensaas – Nottingham Forest – 1998–99
- Frank Strandli – Leeds United – 1992–94
- Jo Tessem – Southampton – 1999–2004
- Alexander Tettey – Norwich City – 2012–14, 2015–16, 2019–20
- Erik Thorstvedt – Tottenham Hotspur – 1992–95
- Fredrik Ulvestad – Burnley – 2014–15
- David Møller Wolfe – Wolverhampton Wanderers – 2025–26

=== Poland ===
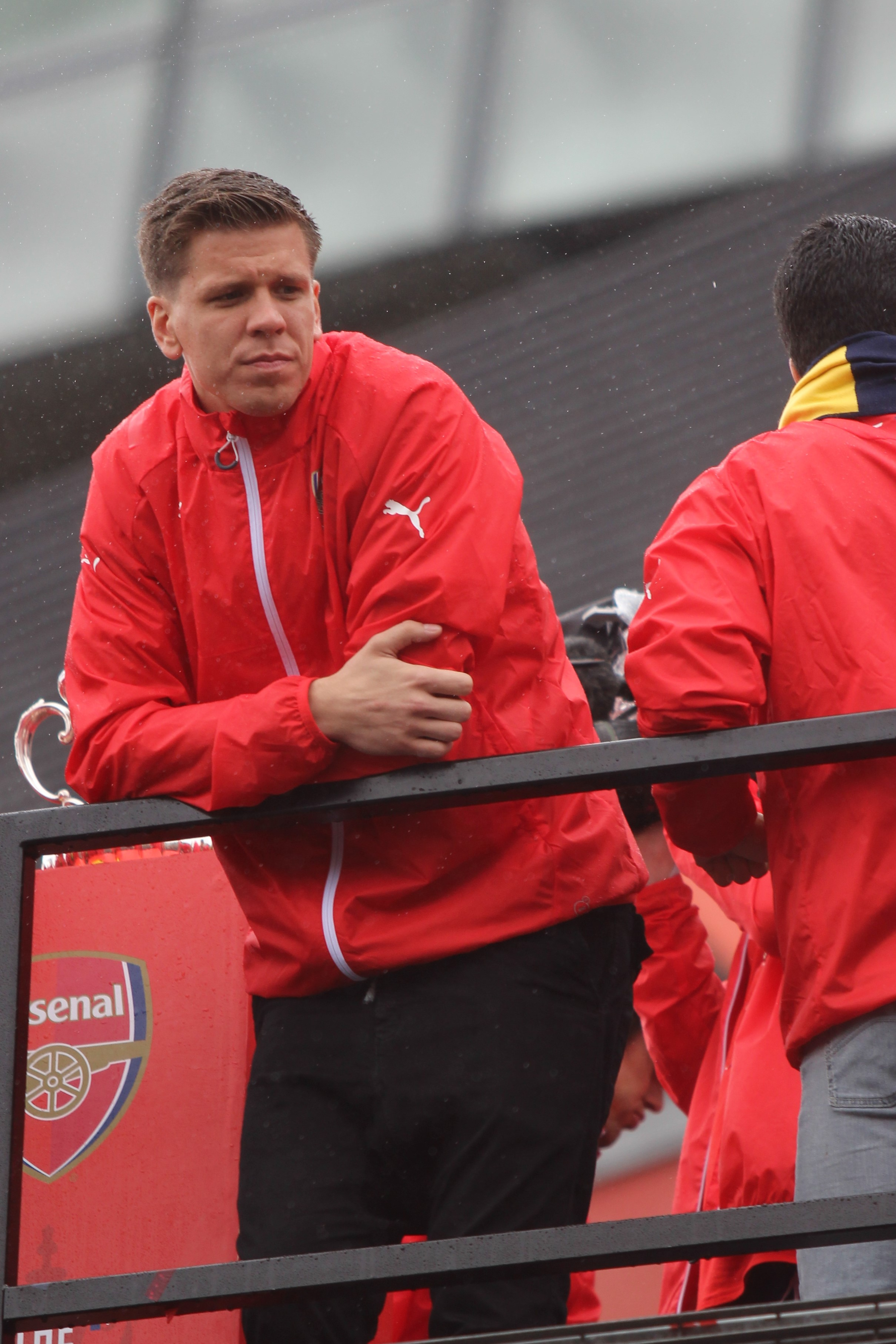
Wojciech Szczęsny played over 100 Premier League matches for Arsenal, and kept the most clean sheets in the 2013–14 season

- Jan Bednarek – Southampton, Aston Villa – 2017–23, 2024–25
- Artur Boruc – Southampton, Bournemouth – 2012–14, 2015–17, 2018–19
- **Matty Cash** – **Aston Villa** – 2020–
- Jerzy Dudek – Liverpool – 2001–07
- Łukasz Fabiański (**376**) – Arsenal, Swansea City, West Ham United – 2007–11, 2012–25
- Jarosław Fojut – Bolton Wanderers – 2005–06
- Kamil Grosicki – Hull City, West Bromwich Albion – 2016–17, 2020–21
- Jakub Kiwior – Arsenal – 2022–25
- Mateusz Klich – Leeds United – 2020–23
- Zbigniew Kruszyński – Coventry City – 1993–94
- Grzegorz Krychowiak – West Bromwich Albion – 2017–18
- Dariusz Kubicki – Aston Villa, Sunderland – 1993–94, 1996–97
- Tomasz Kuszczak – West Bromwich Albion, Manchester United – 2004–11
- Jakub Moder – Brighton & Hove Albion – 2020–22, 2023–25
- Emmanuel Olisadebe – Portsmouth – 2005–06
- Przemysław Płacheta – Norwich City – 2021–22
- Grzegorz Rasiak – Tottenham Hotspur, Bolton Wanderers – 2005–06, 2007–08
- Ebi Smolarek – Bolton Wanderers – 2008–09
- Jakub Stolarczyk – Leicester City – 2024–25
- Piotr Świerczewski – Birmingham City – 2002–03
- Wojciech Szczęsny – Arsenal – 2010–15
- Robert Warzycha – Everton – 1992–94
- Marcin Wasilewski – Leicester City – 2014–17

=== Portugal ===
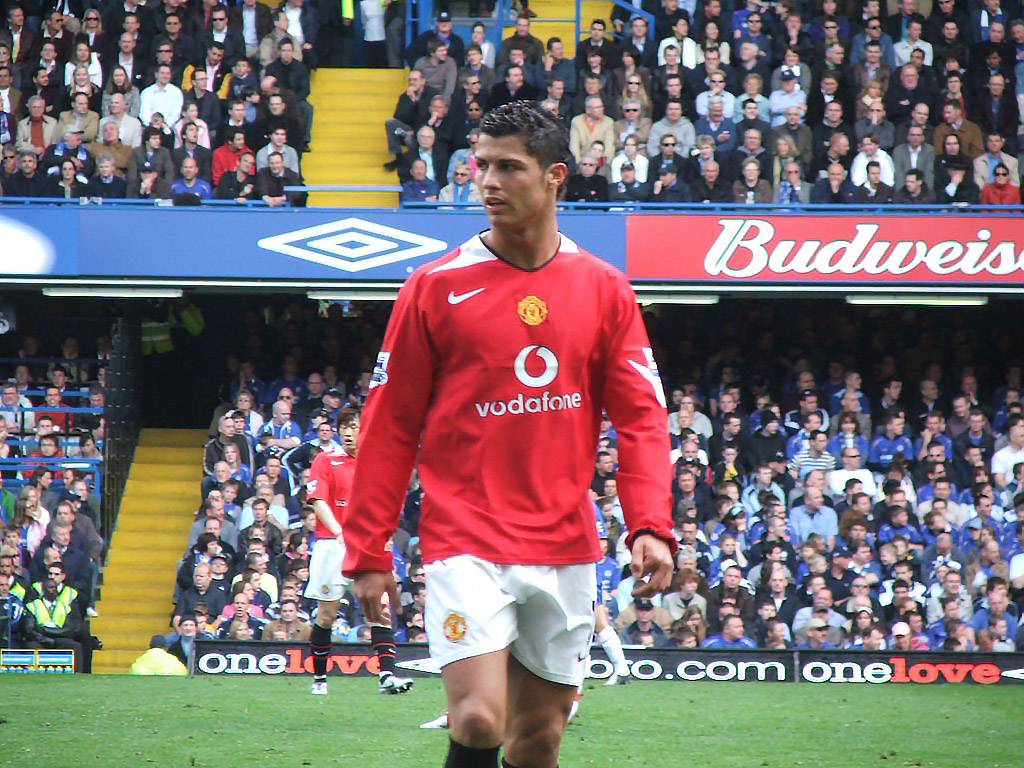
Cristiano Ronaldo won a hat-trick of Premier League titles with Manchester United, was twice voted Player of the Season and is the only player to win the FIFA World Player of the Year while playing in the Premier League

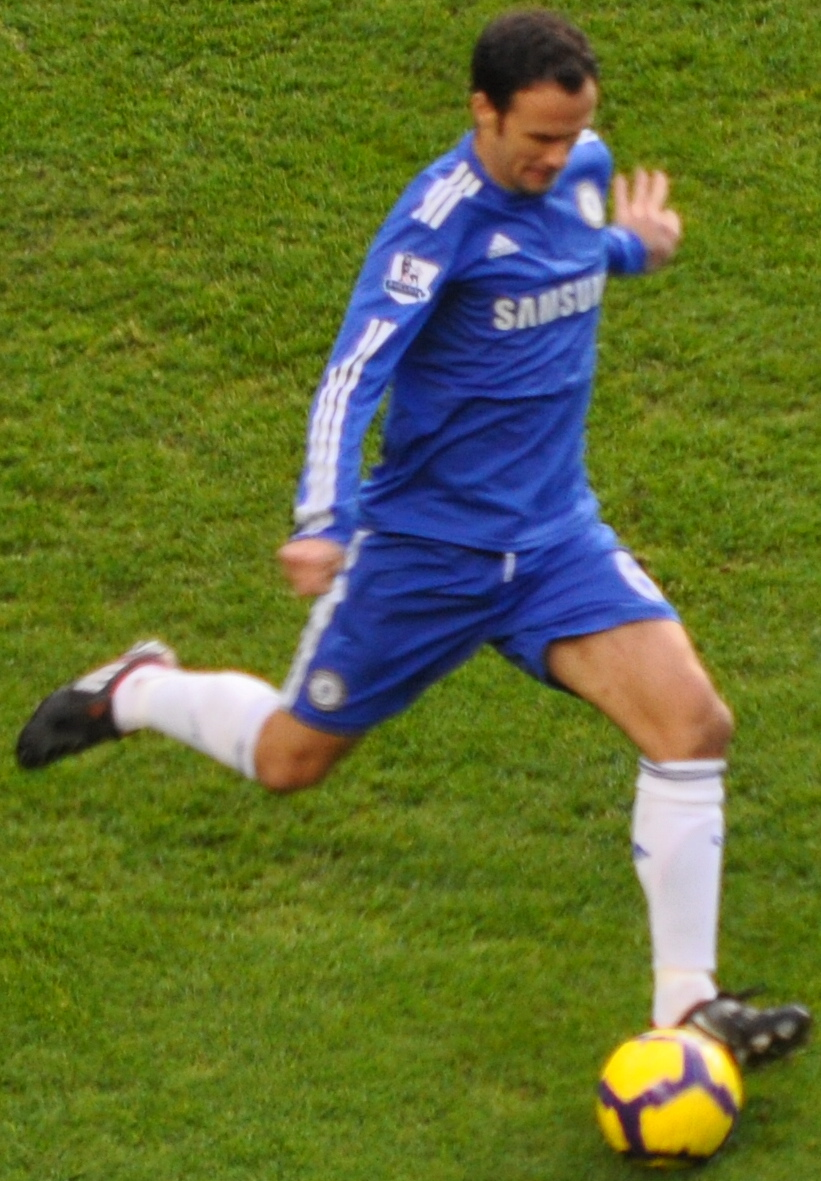
Ricardo Carvalho won three Premier League titles with Chelsea

- Marco Almeida – Southampton – 1999–2000
- Paulo Alves – West Ham United – 1997–98
- Bruno Andrade – Queens Park Rangers – 2011–12
- Amaury Bischoff – Arsenal – 2008–09
- Luís Boa Morte – Arsenal, Southampton, Fulham, West Ham United – 1997–2000, 2001–11
- José Bosingwa – Chelsea, Queens Park Rangers – 2008–13
- Jorge Cadete – Bradford City – 1999–2000
- Cafú – Nottingham Forest – 2022–23
- Rafael Camacho – Liverpool – 2018–19
- João Cancelo – Manchester City – 2019–23
- Daniel Carriço – Reading – 2012–13
- **Fábio Carvalho** – Fulham, Liverpool, **Brentford** – 2020–21, 2022–23, 2024–
- Ricardo Carvalho – Chelsea – 2004–10
- Ivan Cavaleiro – Wolverhampton Wanderers, Fulham – 2018–19, 2020–21
- Cédric – Southampton, Arsenal, Fulham – 2015–24
- Youssef Chermiti – Everton – 2023–25
- Chiquinho – Wolverhampton Wanderers – 2021–22, 2024–25
- Jorge Costa – Charlton Athletic – 2001–02
- **Costinha** – **Brighton & Hove Albion** – 2026–
- **Diogo Dalot** – **Manchester United** – 2018–20, 2021–
- Dani – West Ham United – 1995–96
- Deco – Chelsea – 2008–10
- **Rúben Dias** – **Manchester City** – 2020–
- José Dominguez – Tottenham Hotspur – 1997–2001
- Eder – Swansea City – 2015–16
- Dário Essugo – Chelsea – 2025–26
- João Félix – Chelsea – 2022–23, 2024–25
- **Bruno Fernandes** – **Manchester United** – 2019–
- Gedson Fernandes – Tottenham Hotspur – 2019–20
- Manuel Fernandes – Portsmouth, Everton – 2006–08
- **Mateus Fernandes** – Southampton, West Ham United, **Tottenham Hotspur** – 2024–
- Paulo Ferreira – Chelsea – 2004–13
- José Fonte – Southampton, West Ham United – 2012–18
- Carlos Forbs – Wolverhampton Wanderers – 2024–25
- Paulo Futre – West Ham United – 1996–97
- André Gomes – Everton – 2018–22, 2023–24
- Rodrigo Gomes – Wolverhampton Wanderers – 2024–26
- Toti Gomes – Wolverhampton Wanderers – 2021–26
- Gonçalo Guedes – Wolverhampton Wanderers – 2022–23, 2024–25
- Hélder – Newcastle United – 1999–2000
- Henrique Hilário – Chelsea – 2006–10, 2011–12
- João Mário – West Ham United – 2017–18
- Jordão – West Bromwich Albion – 2002–03
- Bruno Jordão – Wolverhampton Wanderers – 2019–20
- Diogo Jota – Wolverhampton Wanderers, Liverpool – 2018–25
- **Florentino Luís** – Burnley, **Ipswich Town** – 2025–
- Ariza Makukula – Bolton Wanderers – 2008–09
- Mateus Mané – Wolverhampton Wanderers – 2025–26
- Maniche – Chelsea – 2005–06
- Raul Meireles – Liverpool, Chelsea – 2010–12
- Pedro Mendes – Tottenham Hotspur, Portsmouth – 2004–08
- Nuno Morais – Chelsea – 2004–05, 2006–07
- João Moutinho – Wolverhampton Wanderers – 2018–23
- Nani – Manchester United – 2007–15
- Fernando Nélson – Aston Villa – 1996–98
- **Pedro Neto** – Wolverhampton Wanderers, **Chelsea** – 2019–
- Rúben Neves – Wolverhampton Wanderers – 2018–23
- **Matheus Nunes** – Wolverhampton Wanderers, **Manchester City** – 2022–
- Filipe Oliveira – Chelsea – 2002–05
- Nélson Oliveira – Swansea City – 2014–15
- Pablo – West Ham United – 2025–26
- João Palhinha – Fulham, Tottenham Hotspur – 2022–24, 2025–26
- Rui Patrício – Wolverhampton Wanderers – 2018–21
- Joel Pereira – Manchester United – 2016–17
- Ricardo Pereira – Leicester City – 2018–23, 2024–25
- Ivo Pinto – Norwich City – 2015–16
- Daniel Podence – Wolverhampton Wanderers – 2019–23, 2024–25
- Hugo Porfírio – West Ham United, Nottingham Forest – 1996–97, 1998–99
- Hélder Postiga – Tottenham Hotspur – 2003–04
- Ricardo Quaresma – Chelsea – 2008–09
- **Geovany Quenda** – **Chelsea** – 2026–
- Domingos Quina – Watford – 2018–20
- Bruno Ribeiro – Leeds United – 1997–99
- Rodrigo Ribeiro – Nottingham Forest – 2023–24
- Ricardo Rocha – Tottenham Hotspur, Portsmouth – 2006–08, 2009–10
- Dani Rodrigues – Southampton – 1999–2000
- Cristiano Ronaldo – Manchester United – 2003–09, 2021–23
- José Sá – Wolverhampton Wanderers – 2021–26
- Orlando Sá – Fulham – 2011–12
- Renato Sanches – Swansea City – 2017–18
- Nélson Semedo – Wolverhampton Wanderers – 2020–25
- Silas – Wolverhampton Wanderers – 2003–04
- Adrien Silva – Leicester City – 2017–19
- **António Silva** – **Bournemouth** – 2026–
- Bernardo Silva (**304**) – Manchester City – 2017–26
- Fábio Silva – Wolverhampton Wanderers – 2020–22, 2023–24
- Jota Silva – Nottingham Forest – 2024–26
- Xande Silva – West Ham United – 2018–19
- Nuno Tavares – Arsenal, Nottingham Forest – 2021–22, 2023–24
- Sidnei Tavares – Leicester City – 2020–21
- Filipe Teixeira – West Bromwich Albion – 2008–09
- João Carlos Teixeira – Liverpool – 2013–14, 2015–16
- Tiago – Chelsea – 2004–05
- Francisco Trincão – Wolverhampton Wanderers – 2021–22
- Nuno Valente – Everton – 2005–09
- Silvestre Varela – West Bromwich Albion – 2014–15
- Ricardo Vaz Tê – Bolton Wanderers, West Ham United – 2003–09, 2012–15
- Renato Veiga – Chelsea – 2024–25
- Hugo Viana – Newcastle United – 2002–04
- Fábio Vieira – Arsenal – 2022–24
- Rúben Vinagre – Wolverhampton Wanderers, Everton – 2018–21, 2022–23
- João Virgínia – Everton – 2020–21
- Vitinha – Wolverhampton Wanderers – 2020–21
- Abel Xavier – Everton, Liverpool, Middlesbrough – 1999–2003, 2005–07

=== Republic of Ireland ===
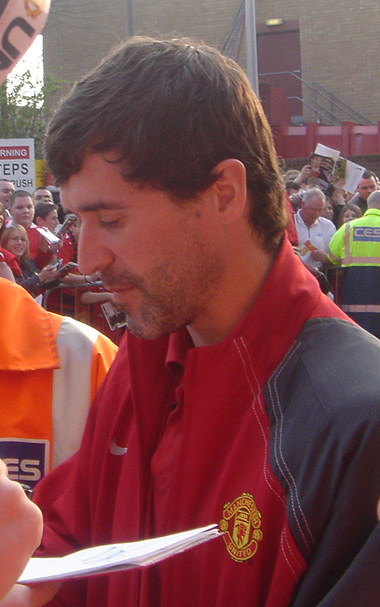
Roy Keane won seven Premier League titles with Manchester United, including four as captain

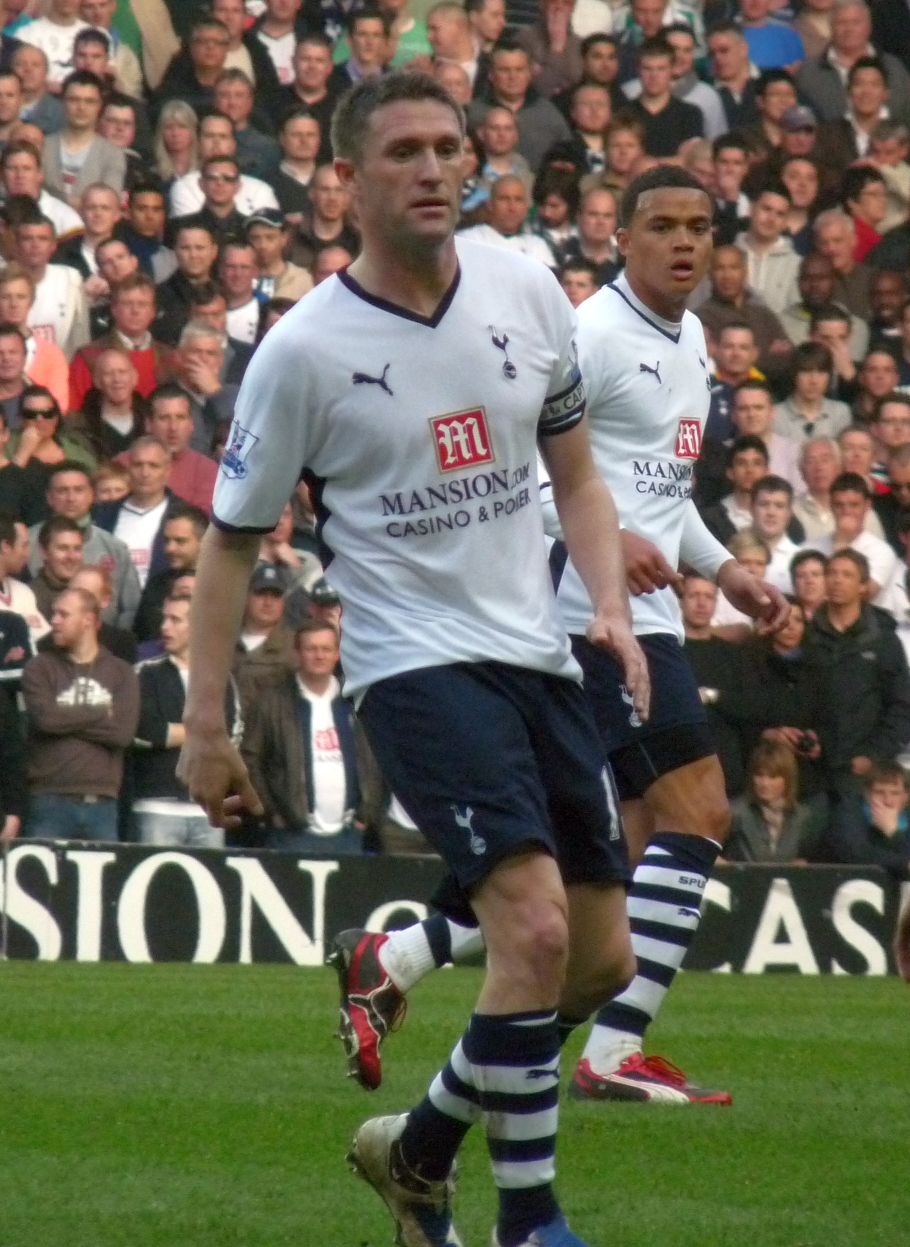
Robbie Keane played for six different Premier League clubs and scored a total of 126 goals

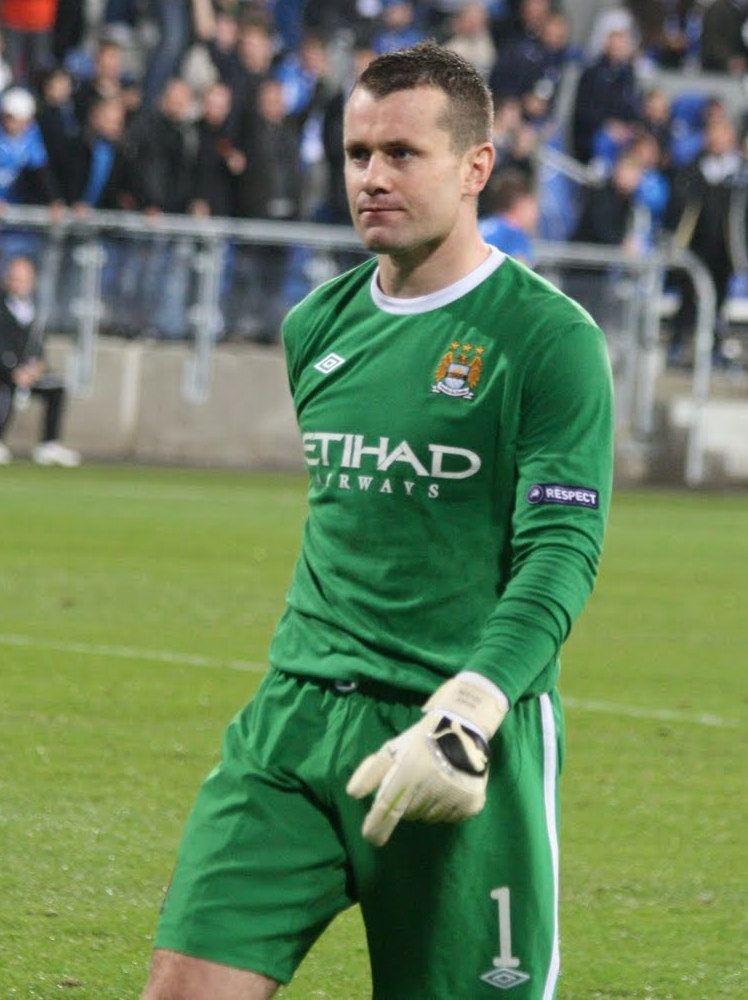
Shay Given kept a total of 113 Premier League clean sheets

- Keith Andrews – Wolverhampton Wanderers, Blackburn Rovers, West Bromwich Albion – 2003–04, 2008–12
- Harry Arter – Bournemouth, Cardiff City – 2015–19
- Phil Babb – Coventry City, Liverpool, Sunderland – 1992–99, 2002–03
- Graham Barrett – Arsenal – 1999–2000
- Gavin Bazunu – Southampton – 2022–23
- Leon Best – Southampton, Newcastle United – 2004–05, 2010–12
- Willie Boland – Coventry City – 1992–98
- Danny Boxall – Crystal Palace – 1997–98
- Lee Boylan – West Ham United – 1996–97
- Robbie Brady – Hull City, Norwich City, Burnley – 2013–21
- Keith Branagan – Bolton Wanderers, Ipswich Town – 1995–96, 1997–98, 2000–02
- Gary Breen – Coventry City, West Ham United, Sunderland – 1996–2001, 2002–03, 2005–06
- Paul Butler – Sunderland, Wolverhampton Wanderers – 1999–2001, 2003–04
- Thomas Butler – Sunderland – 1999–2003
- Shaun Byrne – West Ham United – 1999–2000, 2001–02
- Tom Cannon – Everton – 2022–24
- Brian Carey – Leicester City – 1994–95
- Stephen Carr – Tottenham Hotspur, Newcastle United, Birmingham City – 1993–94, 1996–2001, 2002–08, 2009–11
- Samir Carruthers – Aston Villa – 2011–12
- Lee Carsley – Derby County, Blackburn Rovers, Coventry City, Everton, Birmingham City – 1996–99, 2000–08, 2009–10
- Tony Cascarino – Chelsea – 1992–94
- Eiran Cashin – Brighton & Hove Albion – 2024–25
- Cyrus Christie – Fulham – 2018–19
- Ciaran Clark – Aston Villa, Newcastle United – 2009–16, 2017–22
- Clive Clarke – West Ham United – 2005–06
- Séamus Coleman – Everton – 2009–26
- Nick Colgan – Chelsea – 1996–97
- **Nathan Collins** – Burnley, Wolverhampton Wanderers, **Brentford** – 2021–
- Aaron Connolly – Brighton & Hove Albion – 2019–22
- David Connolly – Wigan Athletic, Sunderland – 2005–08
- Conor Coventry – West Ham United – 2022–23
- Simon Cox – West Bromwich Albion – 2010–12
- Owen Coyle – Bolton Wanderers – 1995–96
- Jim Crawford – Newcastle United – 1996–97
- Josh Cullen – West Ham United, Burnley – 2015–16, 2017–18, 2023–24, 2025–26
- Micky Cummins – Middlesbrough – 1998–2000
- Greg Cunningham – Manchester City, Cardiff City – 2009–10, 2018–19
- Kenny Cunningham – Wimbledon, Birmingham City – 1994–2000, 2002–06
- Liam Daish – Coventry City – 1995–97
- Damien Delaney – Leicester City, Crystal Palace – 2000–02, 2013–18
- Rory Delap – Derby County, Southampton, Sunderland, Stoke City – 1997–2006, 2008–13
- Gary Doherty – Tottenham Hotspur, Norwich City – 1999–2005
- Matt Doherty – Wolverhampton Wanderers, Tottenham Hotspur – 2011–12, 2018–26
- Aaron Doran – Blackburn Rovers – 2008–09
- Jonathan Douglas – Blackburn Rovers – 2002–05
- Colin Doyle – Birmingham City – 2007–08, 2010–11
- Kevin Doyle – Reading, Wolverhampton Wanderers, Crystal Palace – 2006–08, 2009–12, 2014–15
- Damien Duff – Blackburn Rovers, Chelsea, Newcastle United, Fulham – 1996–99, 2001–14
- Shane Duffy – Everton, Brighton & Hove Albion, Fulham – 2011–13, 2017–20, 2021–23
- Jimmy Dunne – Burnley – 2020–21
- Richard Dunne – Everton, Manchester City, Aston Villa, Queens Park Rangers – 1996–2001, 2002–12, 2014–15
- **John Egan** – Sheffield United, **Hull City** – 2019–21, 2023–24, 2026–
- Rob Elliot – Newcastle United – 2012–16, 2017–18
- Stephen Elliott – Manchester City, Sunderland – 2003–04, 2005–06
- Mickey Evans – Southampton – 1996–98
- Keith Fahey – Birmingham City – 2009–11
- Gareth Farrelly – Aston Villa, Everton, Bolton Wanderers – 1995–99, 2001–03
- Neale Fenn – Tottenham Hotspur – 1996–98
- Evan Ferguson – Brighton & Hove Albion, West Ham United – 2021–25
- Steve Finnan – Fulham, Liverpool, Portsmouth – 2001–08, 2009–10
- Scott Fitzgerald – Wimbledon – 1992–96
- Curtis Fleming – Middlesbrough – 1992–93, 1995–97, 1998–2002
- Willo Flood – Manchester City – 2004–06
- Caleb Folan – Wigan Athletic, Hull City – 2006–10
- Tony Folan – Crystal Palace – 1997–98
- Dominic Foley – Watford – 1999–2000
- Kevin Foley – Wolverhampton Wanderers – 2009–12
- Anthony Forde – Wolverhampton Wanderers – 2011–12
- Nathan Fraser – Wolverhampton Wanderers – 2023–24
- Owen Garvan – Crystal Palace – 2013–14
- Jason Gavin – Middlesbrough – 1998–2002
- Derek Geary – Sheffield United – 2006–07
- Darron Gibson – Manchester United, Everton, Sunderland – 2008–17
- Rory Ginty – Crystal Palace – 1997–98
- Shay Given (**451**) – Blackburn Rovers, Newcastle United, Manchester City, Aston Villa, Stoke City – 1996–2010, 2011–13, 2014–17
- Jon Goodman – Wimbledon – 1994–97
- Reece Grego-Cox – Queens Park Rangers – 2014–15
- Michael Harriman – Queens Park Rangers – 2011–13
- Ian Harte – Leeds United, Sunderland, Reading – 1995–2004, 2007–08, 2012–13
- Jeff Hendrick – Burnley, Newcastle United – 2016–22
- Joe Hodge – Wolverhampton Wanderers – 2022–23
- Matt Holland – Ipswich Town, Charlton Athletic – 2000–02, 2003–07
- Wes Hoolahan – Norwich City – 2011–14, 2015–16
- Ray Houghton – Aston Villa, Crystal Palace – 1992–95
- Conor Hourihane – Aston Villa – 2019–21
- Noel Hunt – Reading – 2012–13
- Stephen Hunt – Reading, Hull City, Wolverhampton Wanderers – 2006–08, 2009–12
- Adam Idah – Norwich City – 2019–20, 2021–22
- Stephen Ireland – Manchester City, Aston Villa, Newcastle United, Stoke City – 2005–16, 2017–18
- Denis Irwin – Manchester United, Wolverhampton Wanderers – 1992–2002, 2003–04
- Graham Kavanagh – Middlesbrough, Wigan Athletic – 1992–93, 1995–96, 2005–07
- Robbie Keane – Coventry City, Leeds United, Tottenham Hotspur, Liverpool, West Ham United, Aston Villa – 1999–2012
- Roy Keane – Nottingham Forest, Manchester United – 1992–2006
- Will Keane – Manchester United, Hull City – 2011–12, 2015–17
- **Caoimhín Kelleher** – Liverpool, **Brentford** – 2020–
- Alan Kelly – Sheffield United, Blackburn Rovers – 1992–94, 2001–03
- David Kelly – Sunderland – 1996–97
- Gary Kelly – Leeds United – 1993–98, 1999–2004
- Stephen Kelly – Tottenham Hotspur, Birmingham City, Stoke City, Fulham, Reading – 2003–06, 2007–13
- Jeff Kenna – Southampton, Blackburn Rovers, Birmingham City – 1992–99, 2002–04
- Mark Kennedy – Liverpool, Wimbledon, Manchester City, Wolverhampton Wanderers – 1994–99, 2000–01, 2003–04
- Paddy Kenny – Sheffield United, Queens Park Rangers – 2006–07, 2011–12
- Andy Keogh – Wolverhampton Wanderers – 2009–11
- Alan Kernaghan – Middlesbrough, Manchester City – 1992–96
- Dean Kiely – Charlton Athletic, Portsmouth, West Bromwich Albion – 2000–06, 2008–09
- Kevin Kilbane – Sunderland, Everton, Wigan Athletic, Hull City – 1999–2010
- Mark Kinsella – Charlton Athletic, Aston Villa – 1998–99, 2000–04
- Brian Launders – Crystal Palace, Derby County – 1994–95, 1998–99
- Liam Lawrence – Sunderland, Stoke City – 2005–06, 2008–10
- Kevin Long – Burnley – 2014–15, 2016–22
- Shane Long – Reading, West Bromwich Albion, Hull City, Southampton – 2006–08, 2011–21
- Jon Macken – Manchester City, Derby County – 2002–05, 2007–08
- Alan Mahon – Blackburn Rovers, Wigan Athletic – 2001–04, 2005–06
- Ryan Manning – Southampton – 2024–25
- Alan Maybury – Leeds United – 1995–96, 1997–98, 2001–02
- Jason McAteer – Bolton Wanderers, Liverpool, Blackburn Rovers, Sunderland – 1995–99, 2001–03
- **Kasey McAteer** – Leicester City, **Ipswich Town** – 2021–22, 2024–25, 2026–
- Chris McCann – Burnley – 2009–10
- James McCarthy – Wigan Athletic, Everton, Crystal Palace – 2009–21
- Paddy McCarthy – Crystal Palace – 2013–14
- James McClean – Sunderland, West Bromwich Albion – 2011–13, 2015–18
- David McDonald – Tottenham Hotspur – 1992–93
- Aiden McGeady – Everton – 2013–15
- Paul McGee – Wimbledon – 1992–93
- David McGoldrick – Sheffield United – 2019–21
- Eddie McGoldrick – Crystal Palace, Arsenal – 1992–97
- Brian McGovern – Arsenal – 1999–2000
- Paul McGrath – Aston Villa, Derby County – 1992–97
- John McGrath – Aston Villa – 2000–01
- Mark McKeever – Sheffield Wednesday – 1998–2000
- Stephen McPhail – Leeds United – 1997–2004
- Paul McShane – Sunderland, Hull City – 2007–10, 2013–15
- David Meyler – Sunderland, Hull City – 2009–15, 2016–17
- Liam Miller – Manchester United, Sunderland – 2004–06, 2007–09
- Mike Milligan – Oldham Athletic, Norwich City – 1992–95
- Adam Mitchell – Sunderland – 2012–13
- Jayson Molumby – Brighton & Hove Albion – 2020–21
- Alan Moore – Middlesbrough – 1992–93, 1995–97, 1998–99
- Andrew Moran – Brighton & Hove Albion – 2022–23
- Kevin Moran – Blackburn Rovers – 1992–94
- Chris Morris – Middlesbrough – 1992–93, 1995–97
- Clinton Morrison – Crystal Palace, Birmingham City – 1997–98, 2002–06
- Alex Murphy – Newcastle United – 2023–24, 2025–26
- Daryl Murphy – Sunderland – 2005–06, 2007–10
- Joe Murphy – West Bromwich Albion – 2002–03
- Michael Obafemi – Southampton, Burnley – 2017–21, 2023–24
- Alan O'Brien – Newcastle United – 2005–07
- Andy O'Brien – Bradford City, Newcastle United, Portsmouth, Bolton Wanderers – 1999–2011
- **Jake O'Brien** – **Everton** – 2024–
- Joey O'Brien – Bolton Wanderers, West Ham United – 2004–06, 2007–09, 2012–15
- Liam O'Brien – Newcastle United – 1993–94
- Roy O'Donovan – Sunderland – 2007–08
- Chiedozie Ogbene – Luton Town, Ipswich Town – 2023–25
- Keith O'Halloran – Middlesbrough – 1995–96
- Eunan O'Kane – Bournemouth – 2015–16
- David O'Leary – Arsenal, Leeds United – 1992–94
- Mark O'Mahony – Brighton & Hove Albion – 2023–24
- Andrew Omobamidele – Norwich City, Nottingham Forest – 2021–22, 2023–24
- Keith O'Neill – Norwich City, Middlesbrough – 1994–95, 1998–2001
- **Dara O'Shea** – West Bromwich Albion, Burnley, **Ipswich Town** – 2020–21, 2023–25, 2026–
- Jay O'Shea – Birmingham City – 2009–10
- John O'Shea – Manchester United, Sunderland – 2001–17
- Marcos Painter – Birmingham City – 2005–06
- Troy Parrott – Tottenham Hotspur – 2019–20
- Alex Pearce – Reading – 2012–13
- Gerry Peyton – Chelsea – 1992–93
- Terry Phelan – Manchester City, Chelsea, Everton – 1992–98, 1999–2000
- Anthony Pilkington – Norwich City – 2011–14
- Darren Potter – Liverpool – 2004–05
- Lee Power – Norwich City – 1992–94
- Alan Quinn – Sheffield Wednesday, Sheffield United – 1997–2000, 2006–07
- Barry Quinn – Coventry City – 1998–2001
- Niall Quinn – Manchester City, Sunderland – 1992–97, 1999–2003
- Rob Quinn – Crystal Palace – 1997–98
- Stephen Quinn – Sheffield United, Hull City – 2006–07, 2013–15
- Darren Randolph – Charlton Athletic, West Ham United – 2006–07, 2015–17, 2019–21
- Michael Reddy – Sunderland – 1999–2001
- Andy Reid – Tottenham Hotspur, Charlton Athletic, Sunderland, Blackpool – 2004–11
- Steven Reid – Blackburn Rovers, West Bromwich Albion, Burnley – 2003–15
- Callum Robinson – Aston Villa, Sheffield United, West Bromwich Albion – 2013–14, 2019–21
- Matthew Rush – West Ham United – 1993–95
- Richie Ryan – Sunderland – 2002–03
- Conor Sammon – Wigan Athletic – 2010–12
- John Sheridan – Sheffield Wednesday, Bolton Wanderers – 1992–98
- Tony Sheridan – Coventry City – 1992–94
- Bernie Slaven – Middlesbrough – 1992–93
- Will Smallbone – Southampton – 2019–22, 2024–25
- Tony Springett – Norwich City – 2021–22
- Steve Staunton – Aston Villa, Liverpool – 1992–2003
- Enda Stevens – Aston Villa, Sheffield United – 2012–13, 2019–21
- Anthony Stokes – Sunderland – 2007–09
- Sammie Szmodics – Ipswich Town – 2024–25
- Jay Tabb – Reading – 2012–13
- Sean Thornton – Sunderland – 2002–03
- Kevin Toner – Aston Villa – 2015–16
- Andy Townsend – Chelsea, Aston Villa, Middlesbrough – 1992–2000
- Jack Taylor – Ipswich Town – 2024–25
- Mark Travers – Bournemouth – 2018–20, 2022–25
- Keith Treacy – Blackburn Rovers – 2008–09
- Andy Turner – Tottenham Hotspur – 1992–95
- Jonathan Walters – Bolton Wanderers, Stoke City, Burnley – 2002–03, 2010–18
- Stephen Ward – Wolverhampton Wanderers, Burnley – 2009–12, 2014–15, 2016–19
- Keiren Westwood – Sunderland – 2011–12, 2013–14
- Gareth Whalley – Bradford City – 1999–2001
- Glenn Whelan – Stoke City – 2008–17
- Ronnie Whelan – Liverpool – 1992–94
- Derrick Williams – Aston Villa – 2012–13
- Marc Wilson – Portsmouth, Stoke City, West Bromwich Albion – 2008–17
- Mark Yeates – Tottenham Hotspur – 2003–05

=== Romania ===
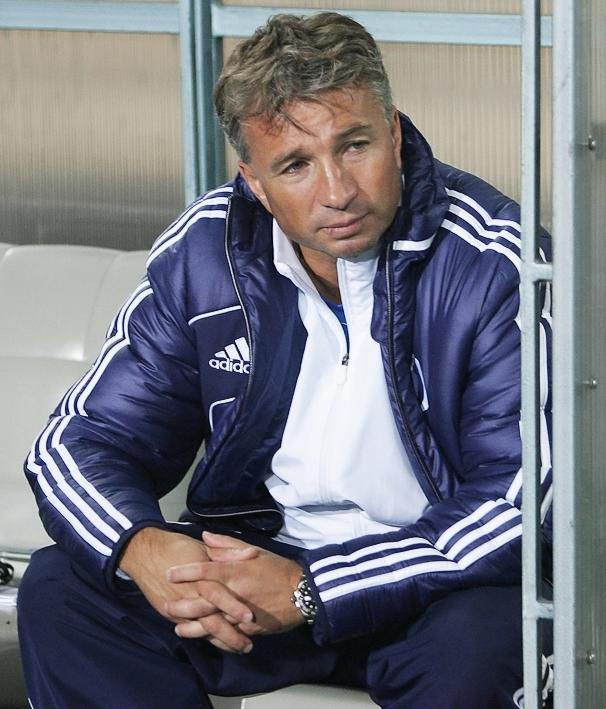
Dan Petrescu was selected as the right defender of the Premier League 10 Seasons Awards Overseas team

- Florin Andone – Brighton & Hove Albion – 2018–20
- Vlad Chiricheș – Tottenham Hotspur – 2013–15
- Cosmin Contra – West Bromwich Albion – 2004–05
- Radu Drăgușin – Tottenham Hotspur – 2023–26
- Ilie Dumitrescu – Tottenham Hotspur, West Ham United – 1994–97
- Ionel Ganea – Wolverhampton Wanderers – 2003–04
- Florin Gardoș – Southampton – 2014–15
- Viorel Moldovan – Coventry City – 1997–98
- Adrian Mutu – Chelsea – 2003–05
- Costel Pantilimon – Manchester City, Sunderland, Watford – 2013–17
- Dan Petrescu (**215**) – Sheffield Wednesday, Chelsea, Bradford City, Southampton – 1994–2002
- Gheorghe Popescu – Tottenham Hotspur – 1994–95
- Ionuț Radu – Bournemouth – 2023–24
- Florin Răducioiu – West Ham United – 1996–97
- Răzvan Raț – West Ham United – 2013–14
- Gabriel Tamaș – West Bromwich Albion – 2010–13

=== Russia ===
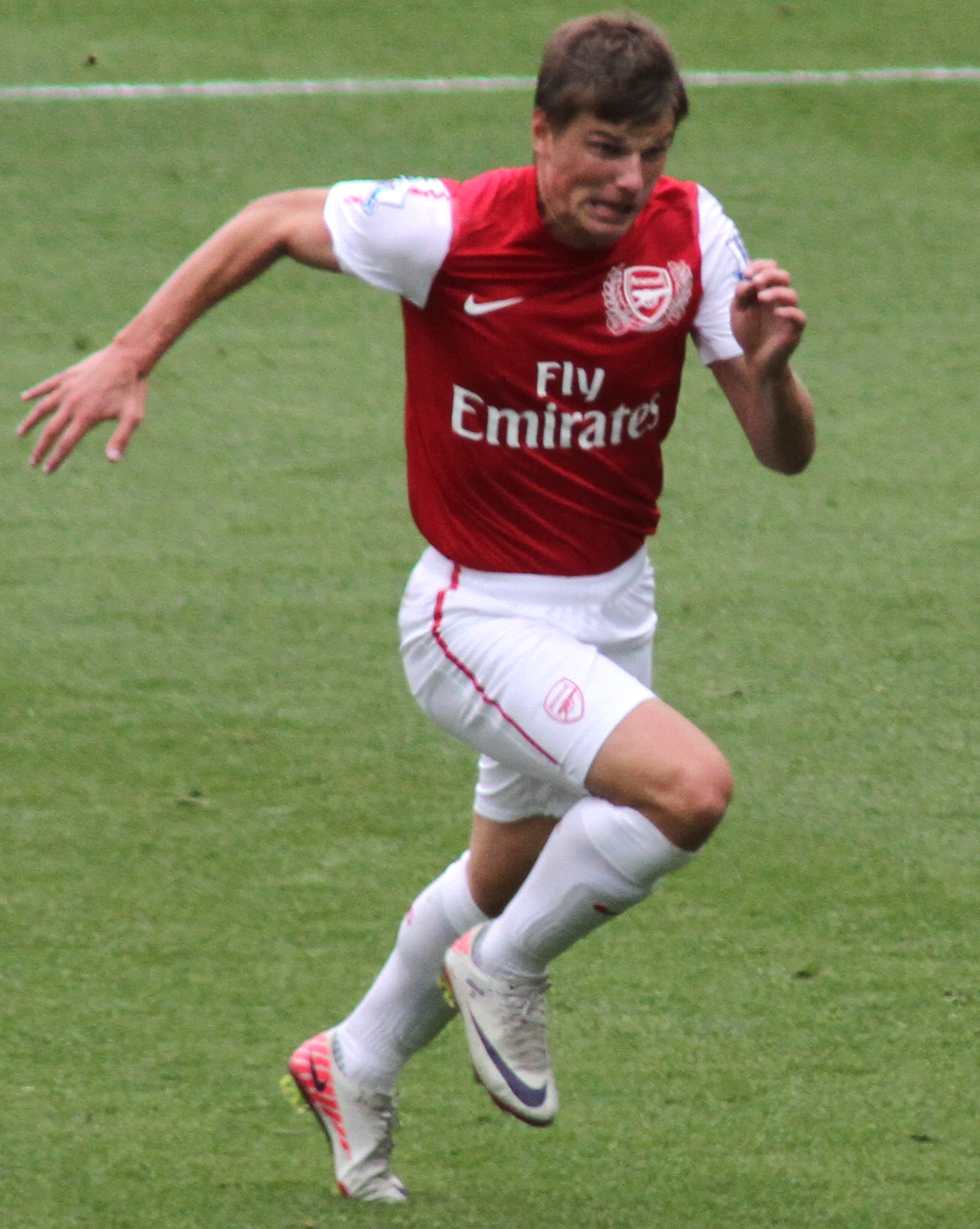
Andrey Arshavin became the first player in Premier League history to score four goals in an away game at Anfield

- Andrey Arshavin – Arsenal – 2008–13
- Diniyar Bilyaletdinov – Everton – 2009–12
- Andrei Kanchelskis (**151**) – Manchester United, Everton, Manchester City, Southampton – 1992–97, 2000–01, 2002–03
- Dmitri Kharine – Chelsea – 1992–99
- Roman Pavlyuchenko – Tottenham Hotspur – 2008–12
- Pavel Pogrebnyak – Fulham, Reading – 2011–13
- Alexey Smertin – Portsmouth, Chelsea, Charlton Athletic, Fulham – 2003–08
- Yuri Zhirkov – Chelsea – 2009–11

=== Serbia ===
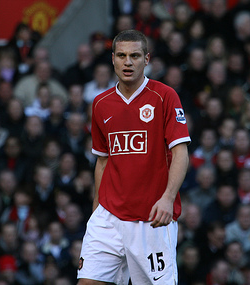
Nemanja Vidić won five Premier League titles for Manchester United and was voted Player of the Season twice

- Jovo Bosančić – Barnsley – 1997–98
- Goran Bunjevčević – Tottenham Hotspur – 2001–05
- Saša Ćurčić – Bolton Wanderers, Aston Villa, Crystal Palace – 1995–98
- Filip Đuričić – Southampton – 2014–15
- Marko Grujić – Liverpool – 2016–18
- Saša Ilić – Charlton Athletic, West Ham United – 1998–2001
- Branislav Ivanović (**274**) – Chelsea, West Bromwich Albion – 2008–17, 2020–21
- Slaviša Jokanović – Chelsea – 2000–02
- Milan Jovanović – Liverpool – 2010–11
- Mateja Kežman – Chelsea – 2004–05
- Aleksandar Kolarov – Manchester City – 2010–17
- Ognjen Koroman – Portsmouth – 2005–07
- Darko Kovačević – Sheffield Wednesday – 1995–96
- **Saša Lukić** – Fulham, **Ipswich Town** – 2022–
- Lazar Marković – Liverpool, Hull City, Fulham – 2014–15, 2016–17, 2018–19
- Nemanja Matić – Chelsea, Manchester United – 2009–10, 2013–22
- **Nikola Milenković** – **Nottingham Forest** – 2024–
- Nenad Milijaš – Wolverhampton Wanderers – 2009–12
- Luka Milivojević – Crystal Palace – 2016–23
- **Veljko Milosavljević** – **Bournemouth** – 2025–
- Savo Milošević – Aston Villa – 1995–98
- Aleksandar Mitrović – Newcastle United, Fulham – 2015–16, 2017–19, 2020–21, 2022–24
- Matija Nastasić – Manchester City – 2012–14
- Kosta Nedeljković – Aston Villa – 2024–25
- **Đorđe Petrović** – Chelsea, **Bournemouth** – 2023–24, 2025–
- Radosav Petrović – Blackburn Rovers – 2011–12
- Dejan Stefanović – Sheffield Wednesday, Portsmouth, Fulham – 1995–99, 2003–08
- Vladimir Stojković – Wigan Athletic – 2009–10
- Dušan Tadić – Southampton – 2014–18
- Zoran Tošić – Manchester United – 2008–09
- Miloš Veljković – Tottenham Hotspur – 2013–14
- Nemanja Vidić – Manchester United – 2005–14
- Zvonimir Vukić – Portsmouth – 2005–06
- Nikola Žigić – Birmingham City – 2010–11

=== Slovakia ===
- Igor Bališ – West Bromwich Albion – 2002–03
- Marek Čech – West Bromwich Albion – 2008–09, 2010–11
- Martin Dúbravka – Newcastle United, Burnley – 2017–26
- Ondrej Duda – Norwich City – 2019–20
- Vratislav Greško – Blackburn Rovers – 2002–06
- Vladimír Kinder – Middlesbrough – 1996–97, 1998–99
- Ján Kozák – West Bromwich Albion – 2005–06
- Juraj Kucka – Watford – 2021–22
- Vladimír Labant – West Ham United – 2001–03
- Filip Lesniak – Tottenham Hotspur – 2016–17
- Ľubomír Michalík – Bolton Wanderers – 2006–08
- Ján Mucha – Everton – 2012–13
- Szilárd Németh – Middlesbrough – 2001–06
- Marek Rodák – Fulham – 2020–21, 2022–23
- Martin Škrtel (**242**) – Liverpool – 2007–16
- Miroslav Stoch – Chelsea – 2008–09
- Dionatan Teixeira – Stoke City – 2014–16
- Stanislav Varga – Sunderland – 2000–02
- Vladimír Weiss – Manchester City, Bolton Wanderers – 2008–10

=== Slovenia ===
- Milenko Ačimovič – Tottenham Hotspur – 2002–03
- **Jaka Bijol** – **Leeds United** – 2025–
- Jon Gorenc Stanković – Huddersfield Town – 2018–19
- Robert Koren (**57**) – West Bromwich Albion, Hull City – 2008–09, 2013–14
- Aleš Križan – Barnsley – 1997–98
- Aleksander Rodić – Portsmouth – 2004–05
- **Benjamin Šeško** – **Manchester United** – 2025–
- Haris Vučkić – Newcastle United – 2011–12, 2014–15

=== Spain ===
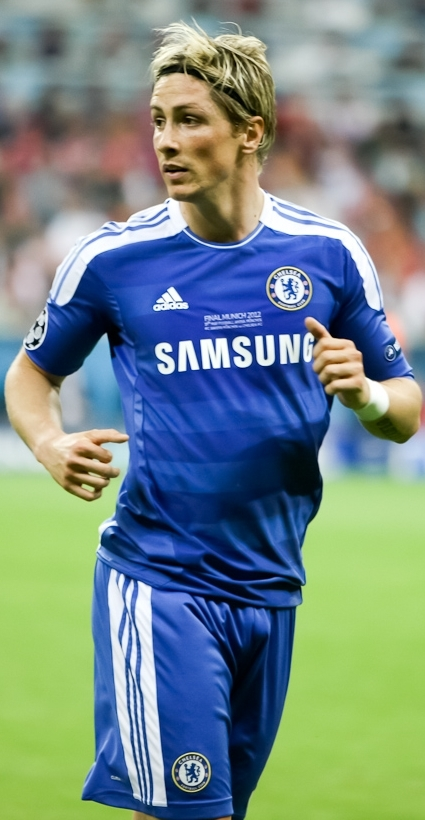
Fernando Torres was signed by Chelsea from Liverpool in 2011 for £50 million, then the most ever paid by a Premier League club

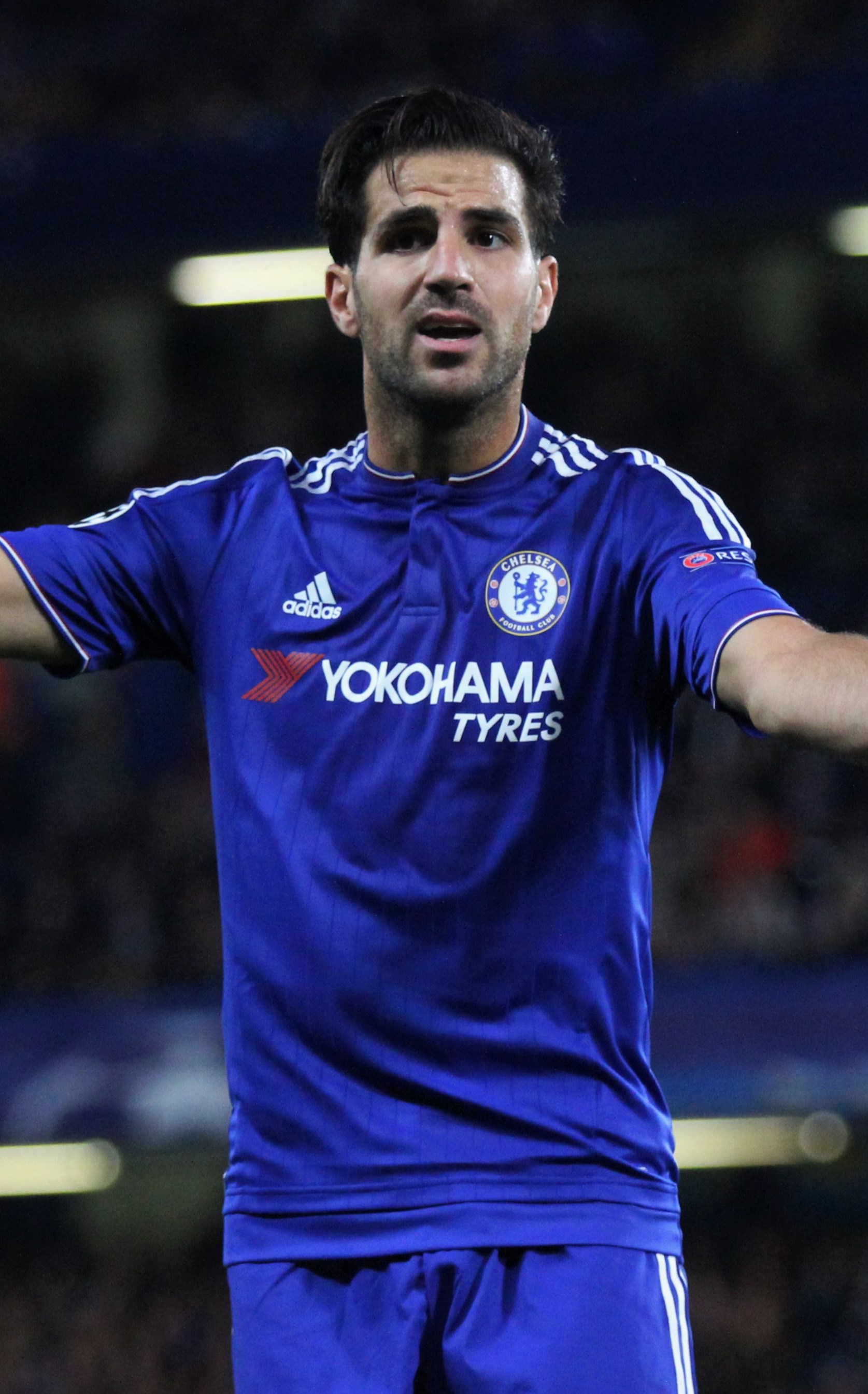
Cesc Fàbregas recorded 111 Premier League assists, the second most ever by a non-British player, and won two league titles with Chelsea

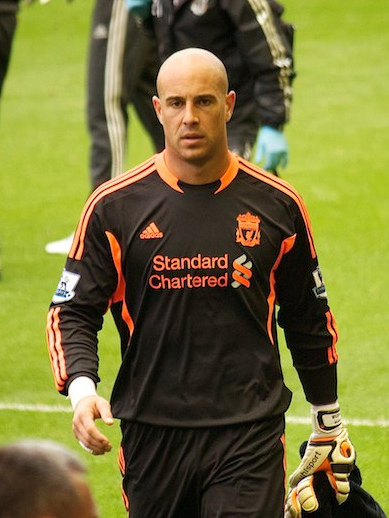
Pepe Reina of Liverpool had the most Premier League clean sheets in three consecutive seasons

- Adrián – West Ham United, Liverpool – 2013–18, 2019–21
- Thiago Alcântara – Liverpool – 2020–24
- Manuel Almunia – Arsenal – 2004–05, 2006–11
- Marcos Alonso – Bolton Wanderers, Sunderland, Chelsea – 2010–12, 2013–14, 2016–22
- Mikel Alonso – Bolton Wanderers – 2007–08
- Xabi Alonso – Liverpool – 2004–09
- **Chema Andrés** – **Brighton & Hove Albion** – 2026–
- **Manuel Ángel** – **Fulham** – 2026–
- Angeliño – Manchester City – 2019–20
- Álvaro Arbeloa – Liverpool, West Ham United – 2006–09, 2016–17
- **Kepa Arrizabalaga** – Chelsea, Bournemouth, **Arsenal** – 2018–23, 2024–
- Mikel Arteta – Everton, Arsenal – 2004–16
- Marco Asensio – Aston Villa – 2024–25
- Iago Aspas – Liverpool – 2013–14
- Daniel Ayala – Liverpool, Norwich City, Middlesbrough – 2009–10, 2011–12, 2016–17
- César Azpilicueta – Chelsea – 2012–23
- Stefan Bajcetic – Liverpool – 2022–24
- Antonio Barragán – Middlesbrough – 2016–17
- Héctor Bellerín – Arsenal – 2014–21
- Bojan – Stoke City – 2014–18
- Borja Bastón – Swansea City, Aston Villa – 2016–17, 2019–20
- Kepa Blanco – West Ham United – 2006–07
- Raúl Bravo – Leeds United – 2002–03
- Bruno – Brighton & Hove Albion – 2017–19
- Hugo Bueno – Wolverhampton Wanderers – 2022–24, 2025–26
- Cala – Cardiff City – 2013–14
- Víctor Camarasa – Cardiff City, Crystal Palace – 2018–20
- Eduard Campabadal – Wigan Athletic – 2012–13
- José Campaña – Crystal Palace – 2013–14
- Iván Campo – Bolton Wanderers – 2002–08
- José Cañas – Swansea City – 2013–14
- Sergi Canós – Liverpool, Brentford – 2015–16, 2021–23
- Kiko Casilla – Leeds United – 2020–21
- Santi Cazorla – Arsenal – 2012–17
- Dani Ceballos – Arsenal – 2019–21
- César – Bolton Wanderers – 2006–07
- **Pep Chavarría** – **Chelsea** – 2026–
- Pedro Chirivella – Liverpool – 2015–16
- Diego Costa – Chelsea, Wolverhampton Wanderers – 2014–17, 2022–23
- Pablo Couñago – Ipswich Town – 2001–02
- José Ángel Crespo – Aston Villa – 2015–16
- Albert Crusat – Wigan Athletic – 2011–12
- Marc Cucurella – Brighton & Hove Albion, Chelsea – 2021–26
- Carlos Cuéllar – Aston Villa, Sunderland – 2008–14
- **Jorge Cuenca** – **Fulham** – 2024–
- Gerard Deulofeu – Everton, Watford – 2013–14, 2015–20
- David de Gea (**415**) – Manchester United – 2011–23
- Enrique de Lucas – Chelsea – 2002–03
- Javier de Pedro – Blackburn Rovers – 2004–05
- Asier del Horno – Chelsea – 2005–06
- José Enrique – Newcastle United, Liverpool – 2007–15
- Cesc Fàbregas – Arsenal, Chelsea – 2004–11, 2014–19
- Fabri – Fulham – 2018–19
- Iago Falque – Tottenham Hotspur – 2012–13
- Ansu Fati – Brighton & Hove Albion – 2023–24
- Kiko Femenía – Watford – 2017–20, 2021–22
- Álvaro Fernández – Brentford – 2021–22
- Albert Ferrer – Chelsea – 1998–2003
- Chico Flores – Swansea City – 2012–14
- Pablo Fornals – West Ham United – 2019–24
- Jesús Gámez – Newcastle United – 2017–18
- Aleix García – Manchester City – 2016–17
- Andrés García – Aston Villa – 2024–26
- Eric García – Manchester City – 2019–21
- **Gonzalo García** – **Fulham** – 2026–
- Javi García – Manchester City – 2012–14
- Luis García – Liverpool – 2004–07
- Manu García – Manchester City – 2015–16
- Javier Garrido – Manchester City, Norwich City – 2007–10, 2012–14
- Bryan Gil – Tottenham Hotspur – 2021–24
- Carles Gil – Aston Villa – 2014–16
- Román Golobart – Wigan Athletic – 2012–13
- Jordi Gómez – Wigan Athletic, Sunderland – 2009–13, 2014–16
- Sergio Gómez – Manchester City – 2022–24
- **Nico González** – Manchester City, **Newcastle United** – 2024–
- Esteban Granero – Queens Park Rangers – 2012–13
- Vicente Guaita – Crystal Palace – 2018–23
- Marc Guiu – Chelsea, Sunderland – 2024–26
- Luis Hernández – Leicester City – 2016–17
- Pablo Hernández – Swansea City, Leeds United – 2012–14, 2020–21
- Ander Herrera – Manchester United – 2014–19
- Fernando Hierro – Bolton Wanderers – 2004–05
- Dean Huijsen – Bournemouth – 2024–25
- Pablo Ibáñez – West Bromwich Albion – 2010–11
- Vicente Iborra – Leicester City – 2017–19
- Jesé – Stoke City – 2017–18
- Álex Jiménez – Bournemouth – 2025–26
- Jonny – Wolverhampton Wanderers – 2018–24
- Joselu – Stoke City, Newcastle United – 2015–16, 2017–19
- Josemi – Liverpool – 2004–06
- Mateo Joseph – Leeds United – 2022–23
- Jota – Aston Villa – 2019–20
- Juanmi – Southampton – 2015–16
- José Manuel Jurado – Watford – 2015–16
- Aymeric Laporte – Manchester City – 2017–24
- Juan Larios – Southampton – 2022–23
- Diego Llorente – Leeds United – 2020–23
- Fernando Llorente – Swansea City, Tottenham Hotspur – 2016–19
- Adrián López – Wigan Athletic – 2010–13
- Fer López – Wolverhampton Wanderers – 2025–26
- Luis Alberto – Liverpool – 2013–14
- Antonio Luna – Aston Villa – 2013–14
- Albert Luque – Newcastle United – 2005–07
- Javier Manquillo – Liverpool, Sunderland, Newcastle United – 2014–15, 2016–23
- Marcelino – Newcastle United – 1999–2001
- Pablo Marí – Arsenal – 2019–22
- Juan Mata – Chelsea, Manchester United – 2011–22
- Eliezer Mayenda – Sunderland – 2025–26
- Gaizka Mendieta – Middlesbrough – 2003–07
- Fran Mérida – Arsenal – 2008–10
- **Mikel Merino** – Newcastle United, **Arsenal** – 2017–18, 2024–
- Roque Mesa – Swansea City – 2017–18
- Míchel – Birmingham City – 2009–10
- Michu – Swansea City – 2012–14
- **Óscar Mingueza** – **Crystal Palace** – 2026–
- Ignasi Miquel – Arsenal – 2011–13
- Nacho Monreal – Arsenal – 2012–20
- Martín Montoya – Brighton & Hove Albion – 2018–20
- Álvaro Morata – Chelsea – 2017–19
- Alberto Moreno – Liverpool – 2014–19
- Álex Moreno – Aston Villa, Nottingham Forest – 2022–25
- Javi Moreno – Bolton Wanderers – 2003–04
- Fernando Morientes – Liverpool – 2004–06
- **Cristhian Mosquera** – **Arsenal** – 2025–
- Marc Muniesa – Stoke City – 2013–17
- **Víctor Muñoz** – **Liverpool** – 2026–
- Marc Navarro – Watford – 2018–19
- Jesús Navas – Manchester City – 2013–17
- Nayim – Tottenham Hotspur – 1992–93
- Álvaro Negredo – Manchester City, Middlesbrough – 2013–14, 2016–17
- Nolito – Manchester City – 2016–17
- Antonio Núñez – Liverpool – 2004–05
- Andrea Orlandi – Swansea City – 2011–12
- Borja Oubiña – Birmingham City – 2007–08
- Daniel Pacheco – Liverpool – 2009–11
- **César Palacios** – **Fulham** – 2026–
- Pedro – Chelsea – 2015–20
- Ayoze Pérez – Newcastle United, Leicester City – 2014–16, 2017–23
- Lucas Pérez – Arsenal, West Ham United – 2016–17, 2018–19
- **Yeremy Pino** – **Crystal Palace** – 2025–
- Gerard Piqué – Manchester United – 2005–06, 2007–08
- **Pedro Porro** – **Tottenham Hotspur** – 2022–
- José Ángel Pozo – Manchester City – 2014–15
- Alejandro Pozuelo – Swansea City – 2013–14
- Iván Ramis – Wigan Athletic – 2012–13
- Àngel Rangel – Swansea City – 2011–18
- **David Raya** – Brentford, **Arsenal** – 2021–
- Sergio Reguilón – Tottenham Hotspur, Manchester United, Brentford – 2020–22, 2023–25
- Pepe Reina – Liverpool, Aston Villa – 2005–13, 2019–20
- José Antonio Reyes – Arsenal – 2003–06
- Ricardo – Manchester United – 2002–03
- Diego Rico – Bournemouth – 2018–20
- Sergio Rico – Fulham – 2018–19
- Albert Riera – Manchester City, Liverpool – 2005–06, 2008–10
- Roberto – West Ham United – 2019–20
- Joel Robles – Wigan Athletic, Everton, Leeds United – 2012–17, 2022–23
- Marc Roca – Leeds United – 2022–23
- Rubén Rochina – Blackburn Rovers – 2010–12
- Rodri – Manchester City – 2019–26
- Rodrigo – Bolton Wanderers, Leeds United – 2010–11, 2020–23
- Oriol Romeu – Chelsea, Southampton – 2011–13, 2015–23
- Míchel Salgado – Blackburn Rovers – 2009–12
- Salva – Bolton Wanderers – 2002–03
- **Juanlu Sánchez** – **Bournemouth** – 2026–
- Robert Sánchez – Brighton & Hove Albion, Chelsea – 2020–27
- Sandro – Everton – 2017–18
- Pablo Sarabia – Wolverhampton Wanderers – 2022–25
- Saúl – Chelsea – 2021–22
- David Silva – Manchester City – 2010–20
- Roberto Soldado – Tottenham Hotspur – 2013–15
- Carlos Soler – West Ham United – 2024–25
- Denis Suárez – Arsenal – 2018–19
- Mario Suárez – Watford – 2015–16
- Suso – Liverpool – 2012–13
- Fernando Torres – Liverpool, Chelsea – 2007–14
- Ferran Torres – Manchester City – 2020–22
- **Pau Torres** – **Aston Villa** – 2023–
- Adama Traoré – Aston Villa, Middlesbrough, Wolverhampton Wanderers, Fulham, West Ham United – 2015–17, 2018–26
- Diego Tristán – West Ham United – 2008–09
- Víctor Valdés – Manchester United, Middlesbrough – 2014–15, 2016–17
- Borja Valero – West Bromwich Albion – 2008–09
- Jesús Vallejo – Wolverhampton Wanderers – 2019–20
- Álvaro Vázquez – Swansea City – 2013–14
- Xisco – Newcastle United – 2008–09, 2010–11
- Yordi – Blackburn Rovers – 2001–02
- **Martín Zubimendi** – **Arsenal** – 2025–

=== Sweden ===
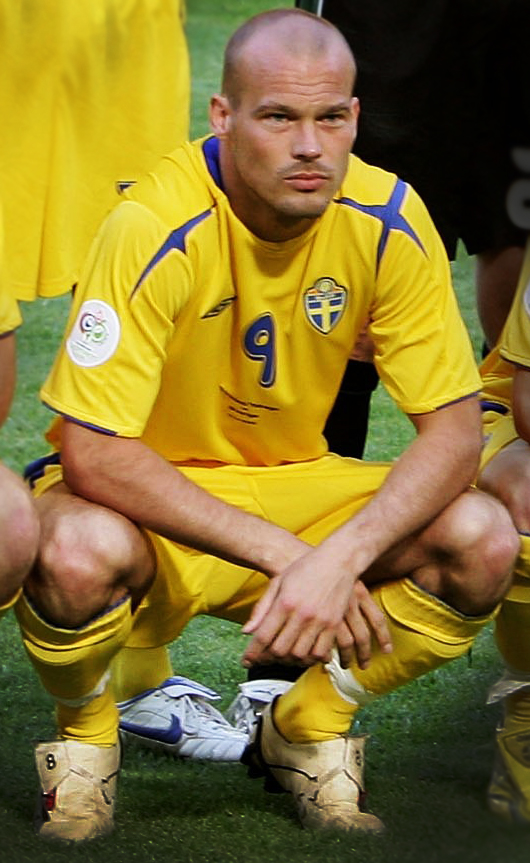
Freddie Ljungberg won two Premier League titles with Arsenal and was named Player of the Season in 2002

- Niclas Alexandersson – Sheffield Wednesday, Everton – 1997–2003
- Marcus Allbäck – Aston Villa – 2002–04
- Anders Andersson – Blackburn Rovers – 1997–98
- Andreas Andersson – Newcastle United – 1997–99
- Patrik Andersson – Blackburn Rovers – 1992–94
- Joel Asoro – Sunderland – 2016–17
- Ludwig Augustinsson – Aston Villa – 2022–23
- **Yasin Ayari** – **Brighton & Hove Albion** – 2022–23, 2024–
- **Lucas Bergvall** – **Tottenham Hotspur** – 2024–
- Joachim Björklund – Sunderland – 2001–03
- Jesper Blomqvist – Manchester United, Everton, Charlton Athletic – 1998–99, 2001–03
- Tomas Brolin – Leeds United, Crystal Palace – 1995–96, 1997–98
- Jens Cajuste – Ipswich Town – 2024–25
- Martin Dahlin – Blackburn Rovers – 1997–99
- Bojan Djordjic – Manchester United – 2000–01
- Erik Edman – Tottenham Hotspur, Wigan Athletic – 2004–06, 2007–10
- Hjalmar Ekdal – Burnley – 2023–24, 2025–26
- **Anthony Elanga** – Manchester United, Nottingham Forest, **Newcastle United** – 2020–
- **Melker Ellborg** – **Sunderland** – 2025–
- David Elm – Fulham – 2009–10
- Johan Elmander – Bolton Wanderers, Norwich City – 2008–11, 2013–14
- Jan Eriksson – Sunderland – 1996–97
- Andreas Granqvist – Wigan Athletic – 2007–08
- **Gabriel Gudmundsson** – **Leeds United** – 2025–
- Niklas Gudmundsson – Blackburn Rovers – 1995–97
- John Guidetti – Stoke City – 2013–14
- Tomas Gustafsson – Coventry City – 1999–2000
- **Viktor Gyökeres** – **Arsenal** – 2025–
- Magnus Hedman – Coventry City – 1997–2001
- Zlatan Ibrahimović – Manchester United – 2016–18
- Klas Ingesson – Sheffield Wednesday – 1994–96
- **Alexander Isak** – Newcastle United, **Liverpool** – 2022–
- Andreas Isaksson – Manchester City – 2006–08
- Andreas Jakobsson – Southampton – 2004–05
- Pontus Jansson – Brentford – 2021–23
- Andreas Johansson – Wigan Athletic – 2005–07
- Nils-Eric Johansson – Blackburn Rovers – 2001–05
- Mattias Jonson – Norwich City – 2004–05
- Alexander Kačaniklić – Fulham – 2011–14
- Kim Källström – Arsenal – 2013–14
- Pontus Kåmark – Leicester City – 1996–99
- Emil Krafth – Newcastle United – 2019–26
- **Dejan Kulusevski** – **Tottenham Hotspur** – 2021–25, 2026–
- Jonah Kusi-Asare – Fulham – 2025–26
- Henrik Larsson – Manchester United – 2006–07
- **Hugo Larsson** – **Fulham** – 2026–
- Sebastian Larsson (**282**) – Arsenal, Birmingham City, Sunderland – 2005–06, 2007–08, 2009–17
- Anders Limpar – Arsenal, Everton – 1992–97
- **Victor Lindelöf** – Manchester United, **Aston Villa** – 2017–
- Tobias Linderoth – Everton – 2001–04
- Freddie Ljungberg – Arsenal, West Ham United – 1998–2008
- Teddy Lučić – Leeds United – 2002–03
- Peter Markstedt – Barnsley – 1997–98
- Jesper Mattsson – Nottingham Forest – 1998–99
- Olof Mellberg – Aston Villa – 2001–08
- Joel Mumbongo – Burnley – 2020–21
- Mikael Nilsson – Southampton – 2004–05
- Roland Nilsson – Sheffield Wednesday, Coventry City – 1992–94, 1997–99
- Kristoffer Nordfeldt – Swansea City – 2015–17
- Robin Olsen – Everton, Aston Villa – 2020–25
- Jonas Olsson – West Bromwich Albion – 2008–09, 2010–17
- Marcus Olsson – Blackburn Rovers – 2011–12
- Martin Olsson – Blackburn Rovers, Norwich City, Swansea City – 2007–12, 2013–14, 2015–18
- Rade Prica – Sunderland – 2007–08
- Martin Pringle – Charlton Athletic – 1998–99, 2000–01
- Marino Rahmberg – Derby County – 1996–97
- Markus Rosenberg – West Bromwich Albion – 2012–14
- Björn Runström – Fulham – 2006–07
- Stefan Schwarz – Arsenal, Sunderland – 1994–95, 1999–2002
- Ken Sema – Watford – 2018–19, 2021–22
- Rami Shaaban – Arsenal – 2002–03
- Fredrik Stoor – Fulham – 2008–10
- **Elliot Stroud** – **Hull City** – 2026–
- Anders Svensson – Southampton – 2001–05
- Mathias Svensson – Charlton Athletic, Norwich City – 2000–05
- Michael Svensson – Southampton – 2002–04
- Muamer Tanković – Fulham – 2013–14
- Ola Toivonen – Sunderland – 2015–16
- Christian Wilhelmsson – Bolton Wanderers – 2007–08
- Jonas Wirmola – Sheffield United – 1993–94

=== Switzerland ===
- Almen Abdi – Watford – 2015–16
- Albian Ajeti – West Ham United – 2019–20
- Manuel Akanji – Manchester City – 2022–25
- Zeki Amdouni – Burnley – 2023–24, 2025–26
- **Aurèle Amenda** – **Coventry City** – 2026–
- Valon Behrami – West Ham United, Watford – 2008–11, 2015–17
- Gaetano Berardi – Leeds United – 2020–21
- Bruno Berner – Blackburn Rovers – 2006–08
- Fabio Daprelà – West Ham United – 2009–10
- Philipp Degen – Liverpool – 2009–10
- Johan Djourou – Arsenal, Birmingham City – 2005–12
- Josip Drmić – Norwich City – 2019–20
- **Nico Elvedi** – **Leeds United** – 2026–
- Edimilson Fernandes – West Ham United – 2016–18
- Gelson Fernandes – Manchester City – 2007–09
- Patrick Foletti – Derby County – 2001–02
- Remo Freuler – Nottingham Forest – 2022–23
- Gaetano Giallanza – Bolton Wanderers – 1997–98
- Bernt Haas – Sunderland, West Bromwich Albion – 2001–02, 2004–05
- Stéphane Henchoz – Blackburn Rovers, Liverpool, Wigan Athletic – 1997–2004, 2005–07
- Marc Hottiger – Newcastle United, Everton – 1994–97
- Gökhan Inler – Leicester City – 2015–16
- Eldin Jakupović – Hull City, Leicester City – 2013–15, 2016–18
- Alex Jankewitz – Southampton – 2020–21
- Pajtim Kasami – Fulham – 2011–14
- Timm Klose – Norwich City – 2015–16, 2019–20
- Stephan Lichtsteiner – Arsenal – 2018–19
- **Johan Manzambi** – **Aston Villa** – 2026–
- Giuseppe Mazzarelli – Manchester City – 1995–96
- Kevin Mbabu – Newcastle United, Fulham – 2015–16, 2022–23
- **Dan Ndoye** – **Nottingham Forest** – 2025–
- **Noah Okafor** – **Leeds United** – 2025–
- **Fabian Schär** – **Newcastle United** – 2018–
- Philippe Senderos – Arsenal, Everton, Fulham, Aston Villa – 2004–08, 2009–15
- Xherdan Shaqiri – Stoke City, Liverpool – 2015–21
- Ramon Vega – Tottenham Hotspur – 1996–2001
- Johann Vogel – Blackburn Rovers – 2007–09
- **Granit Xhaka** (**264**) – Arsenal, **Sunderland** – 2016–23, 2025–
- Denis Zakaria – Chelsea – 2022–23
- Andi Zeqiri – Brighton & Hove Albion – 2020–21
- Reto Ziegler – Tottenham Hotspur, Wigan Athletic – 2004–07

=== Turkey ===
- Bülent Akın – Bolton Wanderers – 2002–03
- Yıldıray Baştürk – Blackburn Rovers – 2009–10
- Altay Bayındır – Manchester United – 2024–26
- Emre Belözoğlu – Newcastle United – 2005–08
- Halil Dervişoğlu – Brentford – 2022–23
- Kerim Frei – Fulham – 2011–13
- Muzzy Izzet (**248**) – Leicester City, Birmingham City – 1996–2002, 2003–06
- Ozan Kabak – Liverpool, Norwich City – 2020–22
- **Ferdi Kadıoğlu** – **Brighton & Hove Albion** – 2024–
- Jem Karacan – Reading – 2012–13
- Colin Kazim-Richards – Sheffield United – 2006–07
- Tugay Kerimoğlu – Blackburn Rovers – 2001–09
- Yunus Emre Konak – Brentford – 2024–25
- Alpay Özalan – Aston Villa – 2000–04
- Tuncay Şanlı – Middlesbrough, Stoke City, Bolton Wanderers – 2007–12
- Nuri Şahin – Liverpool – 2012–13
- Çağlar Söyüncü – Leicester City – 2018–23
- Hakan Şükür – Blackburn Rovers – 2002–03
- Gökhan Töre – West Ham United – 2016–17
- Cenk Tosun – Everton, Crystal Palace – 2017–22
- Ozan Tufan – Watford – 2021–22
- Enes Ünal – Bournemouth – 2023–26
- Cengiz Ünder – Leicester City – 2020–21
- Hakan Ünsal – Blackburn Rovers – 2001–02
- Okay Yokuşlu – West Bromwich Albion – 2020–21

=== Ukraine ===
- Alex Evtushok – Coventry City – 1996–97
- Oleh Luzhnyi – Arsenal, Wolverhampton Wanderers – 1999–2003
- **Mykhailo Mudryk** – Chelsea, **Tottenham Hotspur** – 2022–25, 2026–
- **Vitalii Mykolenko** (**148**) – **Everton** – 2021–
- Serhiy Rebrov – Tottenham Hotspur – 2000–02
- Andriy Shevchenko – Chelsea – 2006–08, 2009–10
- **Timur Tutyerov** – **Sunderland** – 2026–
- Andriy Voronin – Liverpool – 2007–08, 2009–10
- Andriy Yarmolenko – West Ham United – 2018–22
- **Yehor Yarmolyuk** – **Brentford** – 2023–
- Illia Zabarnyi – Bournemouth – 2022–25
- Oleksandr Zinchenko (**148**) – Manchester City, Arsenal, Nottingham Forest – 2017–26

== North, Central America and Caribbean (CONCACAF) ==
=== Antigua and Barbuda ===
- Moses Ashikodi – Watford – 2006–07
- Dexter Blackstock – Southampton – 2004–05
- Mikele Leigertwood (**69**) – Crystal Palace, Sheffield United, Reading – 2004–05, 2006–07, 2012–13
- Dion Pereira – Watford – 2016–17

=== Barbados ===
- Nick Blackman – Blackburn Rovers, Reading – 2011–13
- Emmerson Boyce (**221**) – Crystal Palace, Wigan Athletic – 2004–05, 2006–13
- Gregory Goodridge – Queens Park Rangers – 1995–96
- Paul Ifill – Sheffield United – 2006–07

=== Bermuda ===
- Shaun Goater (**52**) – Manchester City – 2000–01, 2002–03
- Kyle Lightbourne – Coventry City – 1997–98
- Nahki Wells – Burnley – 2017–18

=== Canada ===
- Scott Arfield – Burnley – 2014–15, 2016–18
- Jim Brennan – Norwich City – 2004–05
- Theo Corbeanu – Wolverhampton Wanderers – 2020–21
- **Promise David** – **Brighton & Hove Albion** – 2026–
- Terry Dunfield – Manchester City – 2000–01
- David Edgar – Newcastle United, Burnley – 2006–10
- Craig Forrest – Ipswich Town, Chelsea, West Ham United – 1992–95, 1996–2001
- Junior Hoilett – Blackburn Rovers, Queens Park Rangers, Cardiff City – 2009–13, 2014–15, 2018–19
- Simeon Jackson – Norwich City – 2011–13
- **Daniel Jebbison** – Sheffield United, **Bournemouth** – 2020–21, 2023–25, 2026–
- Liam Millar – Hull City – 2026–27
- Tomasz Radzinski (**194**) – Everton, Fulham – 2001–07
- Paul Stalteri – Tottenham Hotspur, Fulham – 2005–08
- Frank Yallop – Ipswich Town – 1992–95

=== Costa Rica ===
- Brandon Aguilera – Nottingham Forest – 2023–24
- Joel Campbell – Arsenal – 2014–16
- Cristian Gamboa – West Bromwich Albion – 2014–16
- Keylor Navas – Nottingham Forest – 2022–23
- Bryan Oviedo – Everton, Sunderland – 2012–17
- Bryan Ruiz – Fulham – 2011–14
- Mauricio Solís – Derby County – 1996–98
- Paulo Wanchope (**156**) – Derby County, West Ham United, Manchester City – 1996–2001, 2003–04

=== Cuba ===
- Onel Hernández (**26**) – Norwich City – 2019–20

=== Curaçao ===
- Kemy Agustien – Swansea City – 2011–13
- Vurnon Anita (**106**) – Newcastle United – 2012–16
- Juninho Bacuna – Huddersfield Town – 2018–19
- Leandro Bacuna – Aston Villa, Cardiff City – 2013–16, 2018–19
- Tahith Chong – Manchester United, Luton Town – 2018–20, 2023–24
- Kenji Gorré – Swansea City – 2014–15
- Jürgen Locadia – Brighton & Hove Albion – 2017–20, 2021–22
- Cuco Martina – Southampton, Everton – 2015–18
- Shelton Martis – West Bromwich Albion – 2008–09
- Richairo Živković – Sheffield United – 2019–20

=== Dominican Republic ===
- Junior Firpo (**43**) – Leeds United – 2021–23

=== Grenada ===
- Shandon Baptiste – Brentford – 2021–24
- Delroy Facey – Bolton Wanderers – 2002–04
- Jason Roberts (**221**) – West Bromwich Albion, Portsmouth, Wigan Athletic, Blackburn Rovers, Reading – 2002–04, 2005–13

=== Guatemala ===
- Nathaniel Mendez-Laing (**20**) – Cardiff City – 2018–19

=== Guyana ===
- Matthew Briggs – Fulham – 2006–07, 2010–14
- Carl Cort (**111**) – Wimbledon, Newcastle United, Wolverhampton Wanderers – 1996–2004
- Leon Cort – Stoke City, Burnley – 2008–10
- Neil Danns – Blackburn Rovers, Birmingham City – 2002–04, 2007–08

=== Haiti ===
- Jean‐Ricner Bellegarde (**83**) – Wolverhampton Wanderers – 2023–26
- Hannes Delcroix – Burnley – 2023–24
- **Wilson Isidor** – **Sunderland** – 2025–

=== Honduras ===
- Roger Espinoza – Wigan Athletic – 2012–13
- Maynor Figueroa (**214**) – Wigan Athletic, Hull City – 2007–15
- Iván Guerrero – Coventry City – 2000–01
- Milton Núñez – Sunderland – 1999–2000
- Wilson Palacios – Birmingham City, Wigan Athletic, Tottenham Hotspur, Stoke City – 2007–15
- Hendry Thomas – Wigan Athletic – 2009–11

=== Jamaica ===
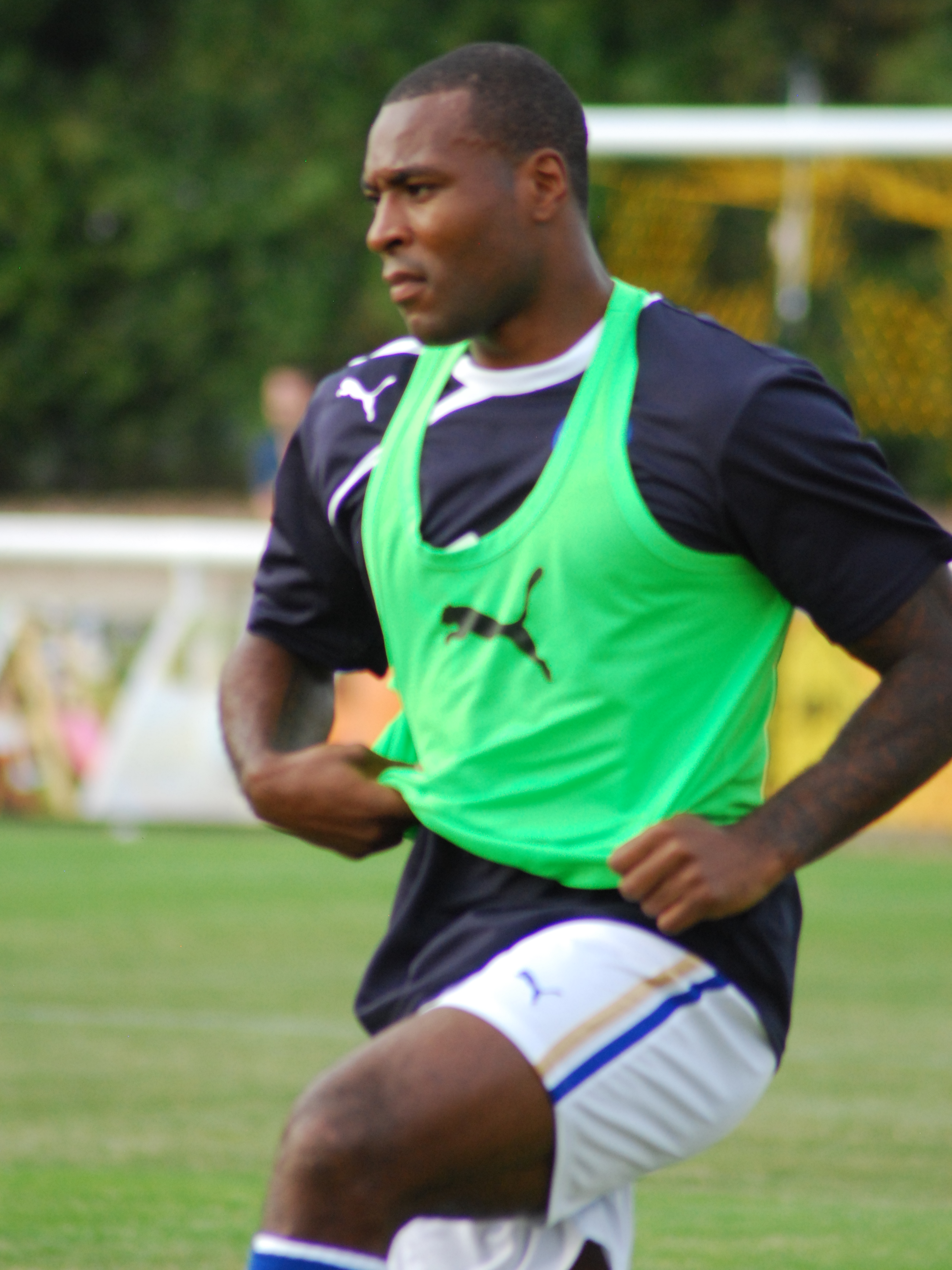
Wes Morgan captained Leicester's title-winning team in 2016

- Rolando Aarons – Newcastle United – 2014–16, 2017–18
- Michail Antonio – West Ham United – 2015–25
- **Leon Bailey** – **Aston Villa** – 2021–
- Giles Barnes – Derby County, West Bromwich Albion – 2007–08, 2010–11
- Jermaine Beckford – Everton – 2010–12
- Amari'i Bell – Luton Town – 2023–24
- Trevor Benjamin – Leicester City – 2000–02, 2003–04
- Elliott Bennett – Norwich City – 2011–14
- Andre Brooks – Sheffield United – 2023–24
- Deon Burton – Derby County, Portsmouth – 1997–2002, 2003–04
- Darren Byfield – Aston Villa – 1997–98
- Jamal Campbell-Ryce – Charlton Athletic – 2002–04
- Shaun Cummings – Reading – 2012–13
- Claude Davis – Sheffield United, Derby County – 2006–08
- Simon Dawkins – Aston Villa – 2012–13
- Bobby De Cordova-Reid – Cardiff City, Fulham, Leicester City – 2018–19, 2020–21, 2022–25
- Lloyd Doyley – Watford – 2006–07
- Robbie Earle – Wimbledon – 1992–2000
- Jason Euell – Wimbledon, Charlton Athletic, Middlesbrough, Blackpool – 1995–2000, 2001–07, 2010–11
- Damien Francis – Wimbledon, Norwich City, Wigan Athletic, Watford – 1997–98, 1999–2000, 2004–07
- Ricardo Fuller – Portsmouth, Stoke City – 2004–05, 2008–12
- Ricardo Gardner – Bolton Wanderers – 2001–12
- Marcus Gayle – Wimbledon – 1993–2000
- Lewis Grabban – Norwich City, Bournemouth – 2015–17
- Anthony Grant – Chelsea – 2004–05
- Andre Gray – Burnley, Watford – 2016–20
- Demarai Gray – Leicester City, Everton – 2015–23
- Paul Hall – Coventry City – 1998–2000
- Isaac Hayden – Newcastle United – 2017–22
- Barry Hayles – Fulham – 2001–04
- Michael Hector – Fulham – 2020–21
- **Rico Henry** – **Brentford** – 2021–
- Mason Holgate – Everton, Sheffield United – 2016–25
- Micah Hyde – Watford – 1999–2000
- David Johnson – Ipswich Town – 2000–01
- Jermaine Johnson – Bolton Wanderers – 2001–03
- Michael Johnson – Birmingham City, Derby County – 2002–03, 2007–08
- Marlon King – Watford, Wigan Athletic, Hull City, Middlesbrough – 2006–10
- **Joel Latibeaudiere** – **Coventry City** – 2026–
- Jamie Lawrence – Leicester City, Bradford City – 1994–95, 1996–97, 1999–2001
- Dexter Lembikisa – Wolverhampton Wanderers – 2022–23
- Kevin Lisbie – Charlton Athletic – 1998–99, 2000–07
- Jamal Lowe – Bournemouth – 2022–23
- Jamar Loza – Norwich City – 2013–14
- Danny Maddix – Queens Park Rangers – 1992–93, 1994–96
- Adrian Mariappa – Watford, Reading, Crystal Palace – 2006–07, 2012–20
- **Ephron Mason-Clark** – **Coventry City** – 2026–
- Jobi McAnuff – Reading – 2012–13
- Garath McCleary – Reading – 2012–13
- Darren Moore – West Bromwich Albion, Derby County – 2002–03, 2004–06, 2007–08
- Liam Moore – Leicester City – 2014–15
- Wes Morgan – Leicester City – 2014–21
- Ravel Morrison – West Ham United, Sheffield United – 2013–15, 2019–20
- Nyron Nosworthy – Sunderland – 2005–06, 2007–10
- Kasey Palmer – Huddersfield Town – 2017–18
- **Ethan Pinnock** – Brentford, **Coventry City** – 2021–
- Darryl Powell – Derby County, Birmingham City – 1996–2003
- Theo Robinson – Watford – 2006–07
- Luton Shelton – Sheffield United – 2006–07
- Fitzroy Simpson – Manchester City – 1992–95
- Frank Sinclair (**288**) – Chelsea, Leicester City – 1992–2002, 2003–04
- Kevin Stewart – Liverpool – 2015–17
- Lee Williamson – Watford – 2006–07

=== Mexico ===
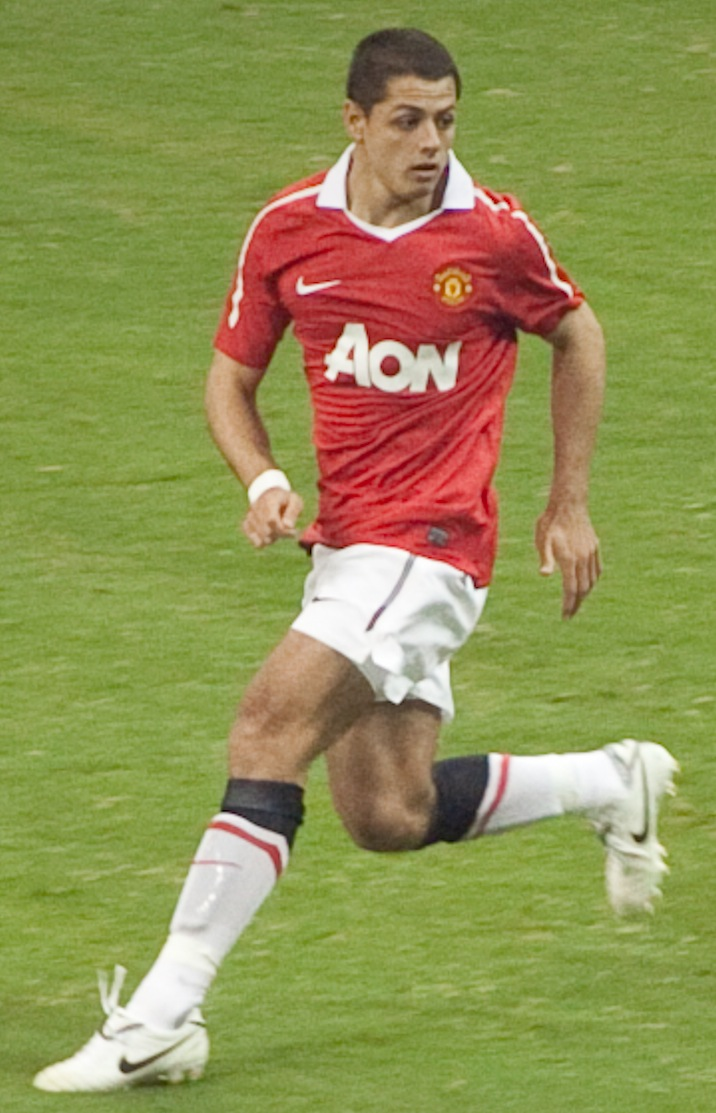
Javier Hernández won the Premier League twice with Manchester United

- Edson Álvarez – West Ham United – 2023–25
- Julián Araujo – Bournemouth – 2024–25
- Pablo Barrera – West Ham United – 2010–11
- Jared Borgetti – Bolton Wanderers – 2005–06
- Nery Castillo – Manchester City – 2007–08
- Giovani dos Santos – Tottenham Hotspur – 2008–12
- Guillermo Franco – West Ham United – 2009–10
- Javier Hernández – Manchester United, West Ham United – 2010–16, 2017–20
- Raúl Jiménez (**233**) – Wolverhampton Wanderers, Fulham – 2018–26
- Miguel Layún – Watford – 2015–16
- Carlos Salcido – Fulham – 2010–11
- Carlos Vela – Arsenal, West Bromwich Albion – 2008–11

=== Montserrat ===
- Brandon Comley – Queens Park Rangers – 2014–15
- Bruce Dyer – Crystal Palace – 1994–95, 1997–98
- Ruel Fox (**223**) – Norwich City, Newcastle United, Tottenham Hotspur – 1992–2000

=== Saint Kitts and Nevis ===
- Jordan Bowery – Aston Villa – 2012–14
- Bobby Bowry (**29**) – Crystal Palace – 1992–93, 1994–95
- Sagi Burton – Crystal Palace – 1997–98
- Adam Newton – West Ham United – 1999–2000
- Romaine Sawyers – West Bromwich Albion – 2020–21
- Calum Willock – Fulham – 2001–03

=== Suriname ===
- Ryan Donk (**16**) – West Bromwich Albion – 2008–09
- Joël Piroe (**16**) – Leeds United – 2025–26

=== Trinidad and Tobago ===
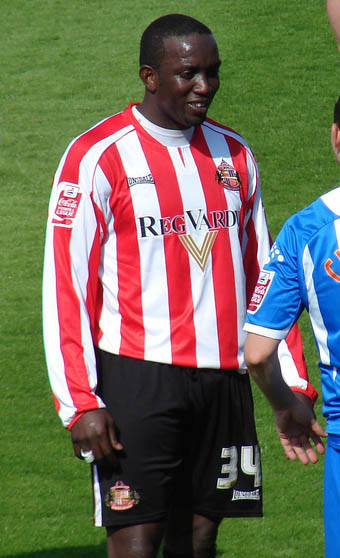
Dwight Yorke scored 123 Premier League goals, a record for a player from North America

- Rio Cardines – Crystal Palace – 2025–26
- Ian Cox – Crystal Palace – 1994–95
- Carlos Edwards – Sunderland – 2007–09
- Shaka Hislop – Newcastle United, West Ham United, Portsmouth – 1995–2002, 2003–06
- Gavin Hoyte – Arsenal – 2008–09
- Justin Hoyte – Arsenal, Sunderland, Middlesbrough, – 2002–09
- Stern John – Birmingham City, Sunderland – 2002–05, 2007–08
- Kenwyne Jones – Southampton, Sunderland, Stoke City, Cardiff City – 2004–05, 2007–14
- Clint Marcelle – Barnsley – 1997–98
- Jlloyd Samuel – Aston Villa, Bolton Wanderers – 1999–2010
- Jason Scotland – Wigan Athletic – 2009–10
- Tony Warner – Fulham – 2005–06, 2007–08
- Dwight Yorke (**375**) – Aston Villa, Manchester United, Blackburn Rovers, Birmingham City, Sunderland – 1992–2005, 2007–09

=== United States ===
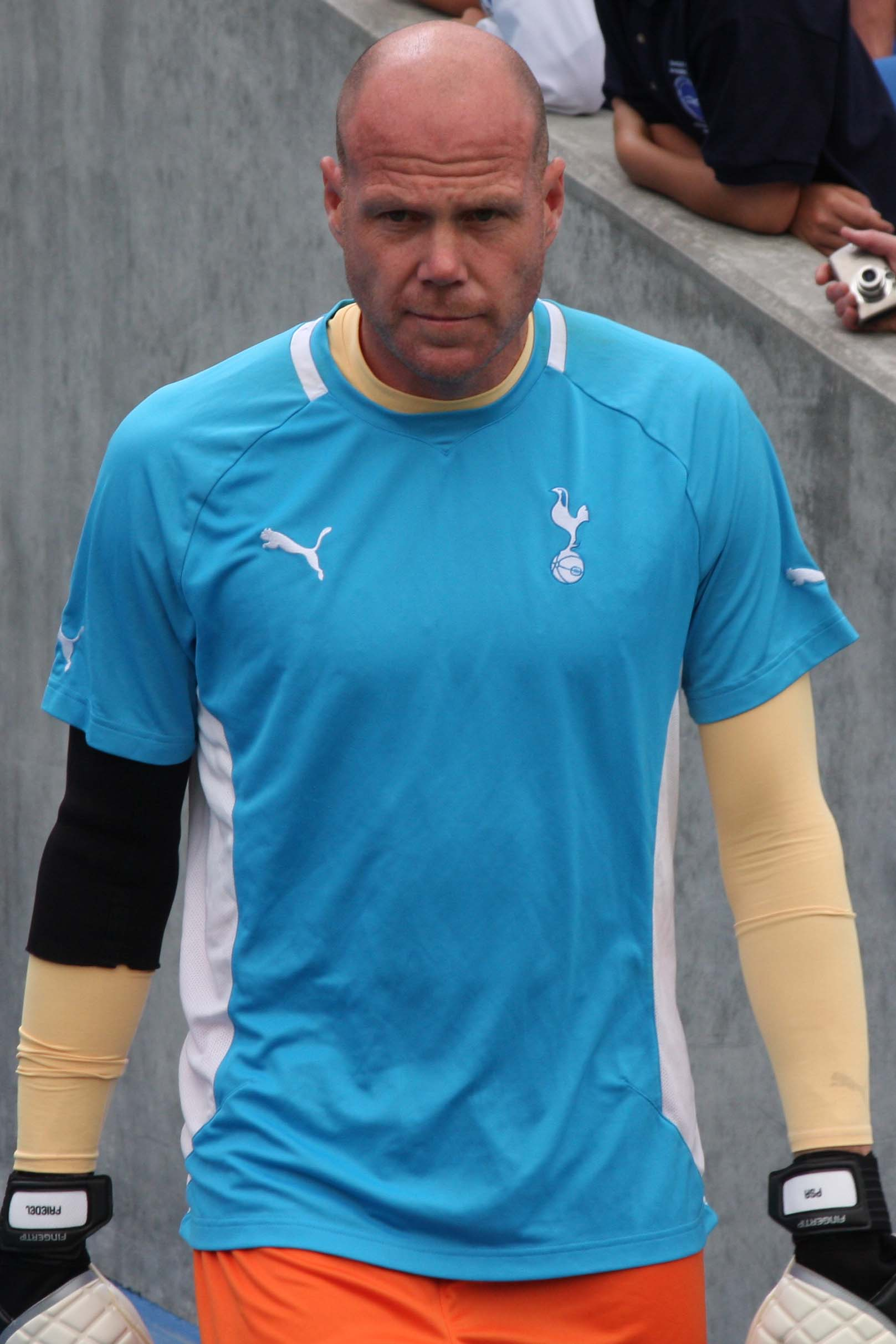
Brad Friedel appeared in a record 310 consecutive Premier League matches during spells at Blackburn, Aston Villa, and Tottenham

- **Brenden Aaronson** – **Leeds United** – 2022–23, 2025–
- **Tyler Adams** – Leeds United, **Bournemouth** – 2022–
- Jozy Altidore – Hull City, Sunderland – 2009–10, 2013–15
- Brandon Austin – Tottenham Hotspur – 2024–25
- Folarin Balogun – Arsenal – 2021–22
- DaMarcus Beasley – Manchester City – 2006–07
- Carlos Bocanegra – Fulham – 2003–08
- Michael Bradley – Aston Villa – 2010–11
- Geoff Cameron – Stoke City – 2012–18
- Bobby Convey – Reading – 2006–08
- Jay DeMerit – Watford – 2006–07
- Clint Dempsey – Fulham, Tottenham Hotspur – 2006–14
- Landon Donovan – Everton – 2009–10, 2011–12
- Maurice Edu – Stoke City – 2012–13
- Benny Feilhaber – Derby County – 2007–08
- Ian Feuer – West Ham United, Derby County – 1999–2000, 2001–02
- Brad Friedel (**450**) – Liverpool, Blackburn Rovers, Aston Villa, Tottenham Hotspur – 1997–2000, 2001–14
- Lynden Gooch – Sunderland – 2016–17
- **Zavier Gozo** – **Crystal Palace** – 2026–
- Brad Guzan – Aston Villa, Middlesbrough – 2008–09, 2011–17
- Marcus Hahnemann – Reading, Wolverhampton Wanderers – 2006–08, 2009–11
- John Harkes – Sheffield Wednesday, West Ham United, Nottingham Forest – 1992–93, 1995–96, 1998–99
- Stuart Holden – Bolton Wanderers – 2009–11
- Tim Howard – Manchester United, Everton – 2003–16
- Emerson Hyndman – Bournemouth – 2017–19
- Eddie Johnson – Fulham – 2007–08, 2009–11
- Jemal Johnson – Blackburn Rovers – 2004–06
- Cobi Jones – Coventry City – 1994–95
- Jermaine Jones – Blackburn Rovers – 2010–11
- Kasey Keller – Leicester City, Tottenham Hotspur, Southampton, Fulham – 1996–99, 2001–05, 2007–08
- Jovan Kirovski – Birmingham City – 2002–04
- Eddie Lewis – Fulham, Derby County – 2001–02, 2007–08
- Eric Lichaj – Aston Villa – 2010–13
- Matt Miazga – Chelsea – 2015–16
- Brian McBride – Everton, Fulham – 2002–08
- Weston McKennie – Leeds United – 2022–23
- Joe-Max Moore – Everton – 1999–2002
- Oguchi Onyewu – Newcastle United – 2006–07
- Owen Otasowie – Wolverhampton Wanderers – 2020–21
- Preki – Everton – 1992–94
- Christian Pulisic – Chelsea – 2019–23
- Tim Ream – Bolton Wanderers, Fulham – 2011–12, 2018–19, 2020–21, 2022–24
- Claudio Reyna – Sunderland, Manchester City – 2001–07
- Giovanni Reyna – Nottingham Forest – 2023–24
- **Chris Richards** – **Crystal Palace** – 2022–
- **Antonee Robinson** – **Fulham** – 2020–21, 2022–
- Josh Sargent – Norwich City – 2021–22
- Brek Shea – Stoke City – 2012–14
- Johann Smith – Bolton Wanderers – 2006–07
- Juergen Sommer – Queens Park Rangers – 1995–96
- Jonathan Spector – Manchester United, Charlton Athletic, West Ham United – 2004–11
- Zack Steffen – Manchester City – 2020–22
- Auston Trusty – Sheffield United – 2023–24
- Matt Turner – Nottingham Forest – 2023–24
- Indiana Vassilev – Aston Villa – 2019–20
- Roy Wegerle – Blackburn Rovers, Coventry City – 1992–95
- Zak Whitbread – Norwich City – 2011–12
- Danny Williams – Huddersfield Town – 2017–19
- DeAndre Yedlin – Tottenham Hotspur, Sunderland, Newcastle United – 2014–16, 2017–21

== Oceania (OFC) ==
=== New Zealand ===
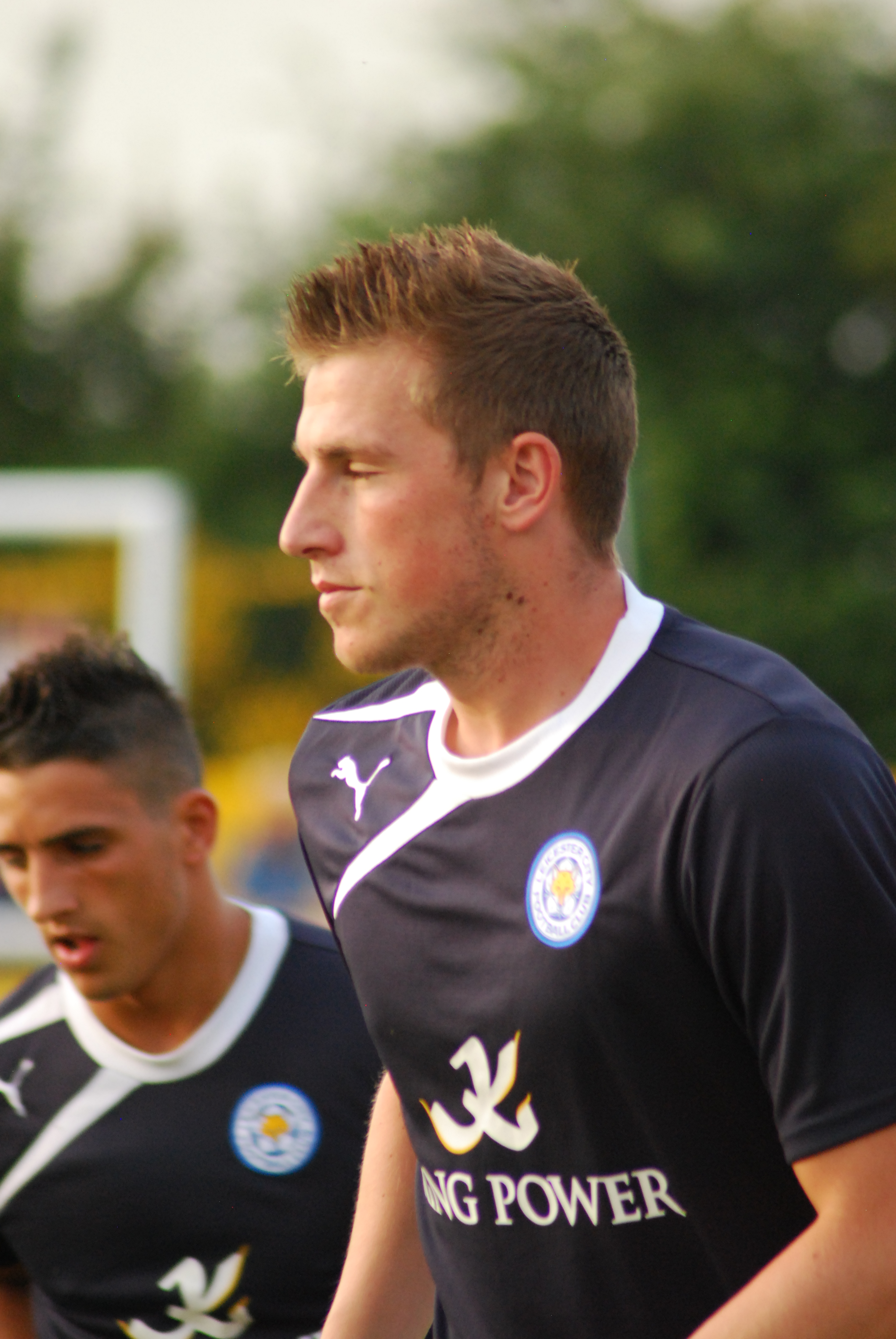
Chris Wood has made over 200 Premier League appearances and played for five different clubs

- Simon Elliott – Fulham – 2005–06
- Danny Hay – Leeds United – 2000–01
- Ryan Nelsen – Blackburn Rovers, Tottenham Hotspur, Queens Park Rangers – 2004–13
- Lee Norfolk – Ipswich Town – 1994–95
- Winston Reid – West Ham United – 2010–11, 2012–18
- **Chris Wood** (**282**) – West Bromwich Albion, Leicester City, Burnley, Newcastle United, **Nottingham Forest** – 2008–09, 2010–11, 2014–15, 2017–

== South America (CONMEBOL) ==
=== Argentina ===
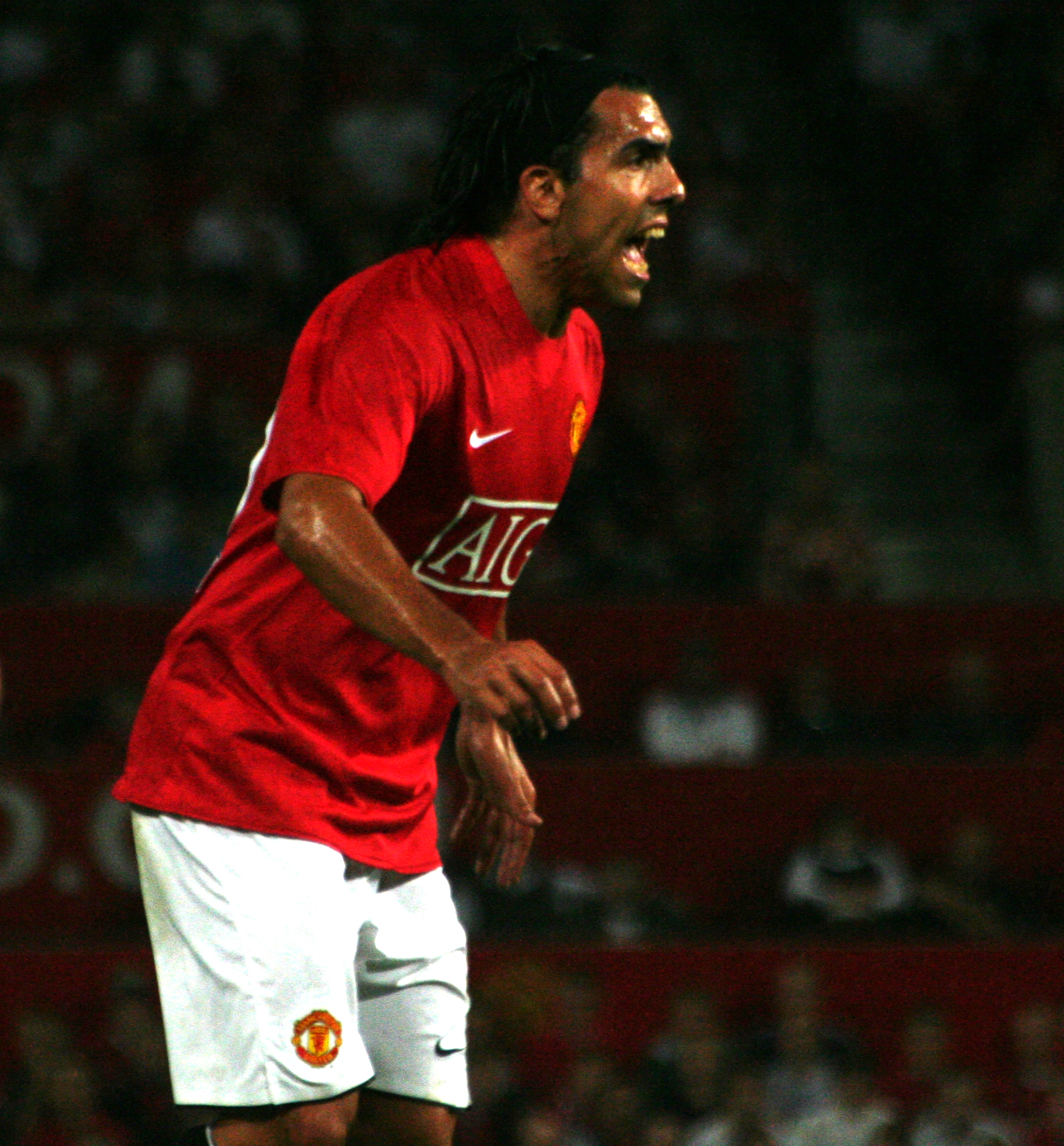
Carlos Tevez won the Premier League at Manchester United and Manchester City

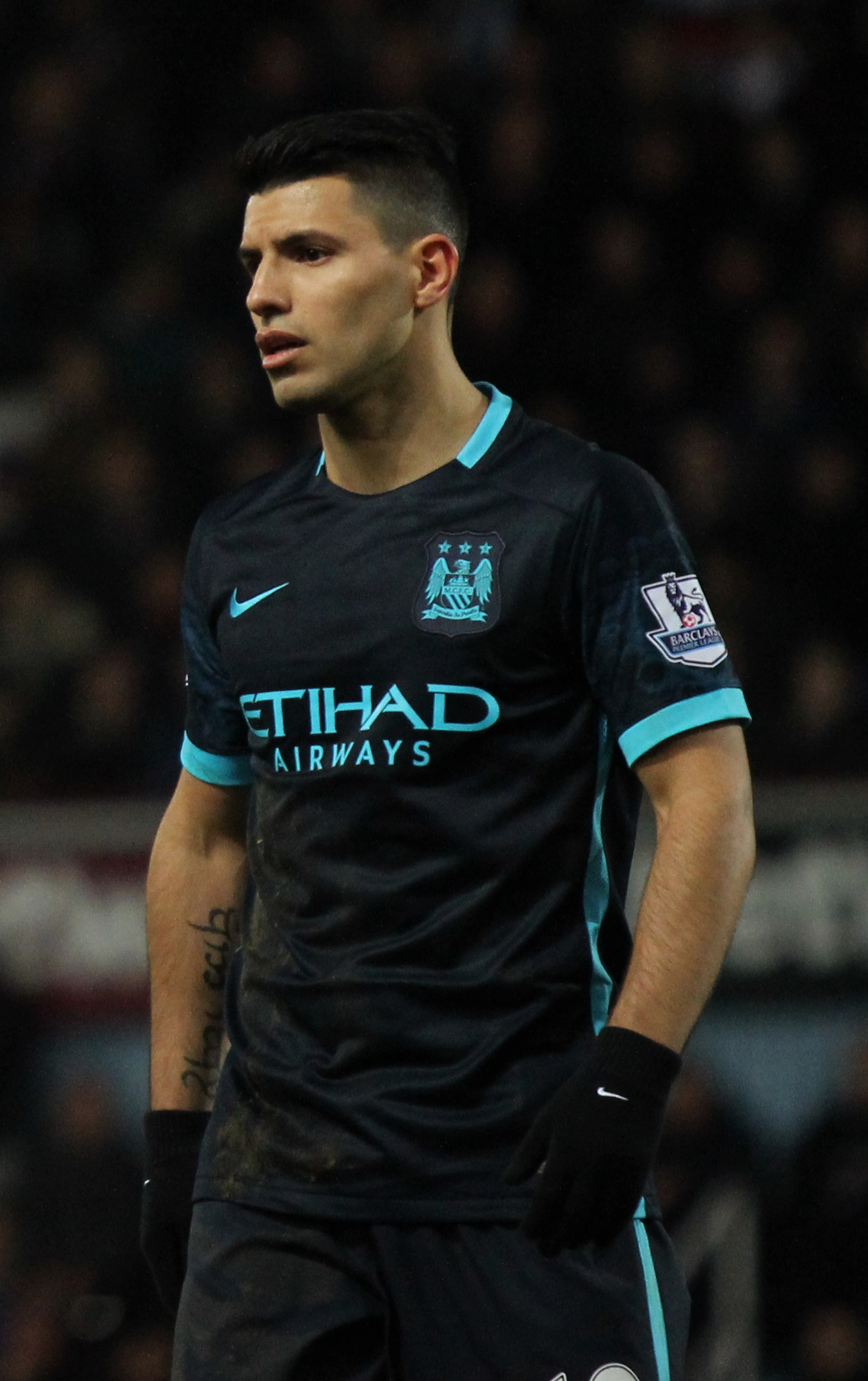
Sergio Agüero won five Premier League titles with Manchester City, and is the highest scoring foreign player in Premier League history

- Sergio Agüero – Manchester City – 2011–21
- **Charly Alcaraz** – Southampton, **Everton** – 2022–23, 2024–
- Julián Álvarez – Manchester City – 2022–24
- Ricky Álvarez – Sunderland – 2014–15
- Marcos Angeleri – Sunderland – 2010–11
- Julio Arca – Sunderland, Middlesbrough – 2000–03, 2005–09
- **Valentín Barco** – Brighton & Hove Albion, **Chelsea** – 2023–24, 2026–
- Christian Bassedas – Newcastle United – 2000–02
- Luciano Becchio – Norwich City – 2012–14
- **Walter Benítez** – **Crystal Palace** – 2025–
- Federico Bessone – Swansea City – 2011–12
- Sebastián Blanco – West Bromwich Albion – 2014–15
- Mauro Boselli – Wigan Athletic – 2010–11, 2012–13
- **Emiliano Buendía** – Norwich City, **Aston Villa** – 2019–20, 2021–23, 2024–
- Facundo Buonanotte – Brighton & Hove Albion, Leicester City, Chelsea, Leeds United – 2022–26
- Fabián Caballero – Arsenal – 1998–99
- Willy Caballero – Manchester City, Chelsea, Southampton – 2014–22
- Jonathan Calleri – West Ham United – 2016–17
- Esteban Cambiasso – Leicester City – 2014–15
- Horacio Carbonari – Derby County – 1998–2002
- Guido Carrillo – Southampton – 2017–18
- Taty Castellanos – West Ham United – 2025–26
- Juan Cobián – Sheffield Wednesday – 1998–99
- Fabricio Coloccini – Newcastle United – 2008–09, 2010–16
- Daniel Cordone – Newcastle United – 2000–01
- Hernán Crespo – Chelsea – 2003–04, 2005–06
- Andrés D'Alessandro – Portsmouth – 2005–06
- Martín Demichelis – Manchester City – 2013–16
- Ángel Di María – Manchester United – 2014–15
- Franco Di Santo – Chelsea, Blackburn Rovers, Wigan Athletic – 2008–13
- **Nicolás Domínguez** – **Nottingham Forest** – 2023–
- Claudio Echeverri – Manchester City – 2024–25
- Alejandro Faurlín – Queens Park Rangers – 2011–13, 2014–15
- Federico Fazio – Tottenham Hotspur – 2014–15
- **Enzo Fernández** – Chelsea, **Manchester City** – 2022–
- Federico Fernández – Swansea City, Newcastle United – 2014–22
- Mauro Formica – Blackburn Rovers – 2011–12
- Juan Foyth – Tottenham Hotspur – 2018–20
- Esteban Fuertes – Derby County – 1999–2000
- Ramiro Funes Mori – Everton – 2015–18
- **Alejandro Garnacho** – Manchester United, Chelsea, **Aston Villa** – 2021–
- Paulo Gazzaniga – Southampton, Tottenham Hotspur – 2012–16, 2017–20
- Jonás Gutiérrez – Newcastle United, Norwich City – 2008–09, 2010–15
- Gabriel Heinze – Manchester United – 2004–07
- Martín Herrera – Fulham – 2002–03
- Gonzalo Higuaín – Chelsea – 2018–19
- Emiliano Insúa – Liverpool – 2006–10
- Erik Lamela – Tottenham Hotspur – 2013–21
- Manuel Lanzini – West Ham United – 2015–23
- Giovani Lo Celso – Tottenham Hotspur – 2019–22, 2023–24
- **Alexis Mac Allister** – Brighton & Hove Albion, **Liverpool** – 2019–
- Carlos Marinelli – Middlesbrough – 1999–2004
- **Emiliano Martínez** – Arsenal, Aston Villa, **Chelsea** – 2014–15, 2016–17, 2019–
- **Lisandro Martínez** – **Manchester United** – 2022–
- Javier Mascherano – West Ham United, Liverpool – 2006–11
- Juan Carlos Menseguez – West Bromwich Albion – 2008–09
- Gonzalo Montiel – Nottingham Forest – 2023–24
- Nicolás Otamendi – Manchester City – 2015–20
- **Exequiel Palacios** – **Ipswich Town** – 2026–
- Mauricio Pellegrino – Liverpool – 2004–05
- Sixto Peralta – Ipswich Town – 2001–02
- Roberto Pereyra – Watford – 2016–20
- Máximo Perrone – Manchester City – 2022–23
- Ignacio Pussetto – Watford – 2019–20
- Guido Rodríguez – West Ham United – 2024–26
- Maxi Rodríguez – Liverpool – 2009–12
- Marcos Rojo – Manchester United – 2014–20
- Cristian Romero – Tottenham Hotspur – 2021–26
- Sergio Romero – Manchester United – 2015–18
- Facundo Sava – Fulham – 2002–04
- Lionel Scaloni – West Ham United – 2005–06
- Ignacio Scocco – Sunderland – 2013–14
- **Marcos Senesi** – Bournemouth, **Tottenham Hotspur** – 2022–
- **Julio Soler** – **Bournemouth** – 2024–
- Julián Speroni – Crystal Palace – 2004–05, 2013–16, 2017–19
- Denis Stracqualursi – Everton – 2011–12
- Mauricio Taricco – Tottenham Hotspur – 1998–2004
- Carlos Tevez – West Ham United, Manchester United, Manchester City – 2006–13
- Leonardo Ulloa – Leicester City, Brighton & Hove Albion – 2014–18
- Alejo Véliz – Tottenham Hotspur – 2023–24
- Santiago Vergini – Sunderland – 2013–15
- Juan Sebastián Verón – Manchester United, Chelsea – 2001–04
- Luciano Vietto – Fulham – 2018–19
- Emanuel Villa – Derby County – 2007–08
- Nelson Vivas – Arsenal – 1998–2001
- Claudio Yacob – West Bromwich Albion – 2012–18
- Pablo Zabaleta (**303**) – Manchester City, West Ham United – 2008–20
- Mauro Zárate – Birmingham City, West Ham United, Queens Park Rangers, Watford – 2007–08, 2014–17
- Luciano Zavagno – Derby County – 2001–02

=== Bolivia ===
- Jaime Moreno – Middlesbrough – 1995–96
- Marcelo Moreno (**12**) – Wigan Athletic – 2009–10

=== Brazil ===
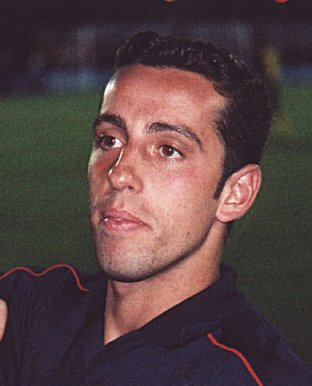
Edu was a member of the Arsenal "Invincibles" team which won the Premier League in 2004

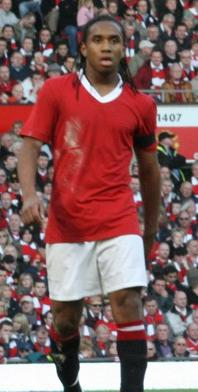
Anderson won four Premier League titles with Manchester United

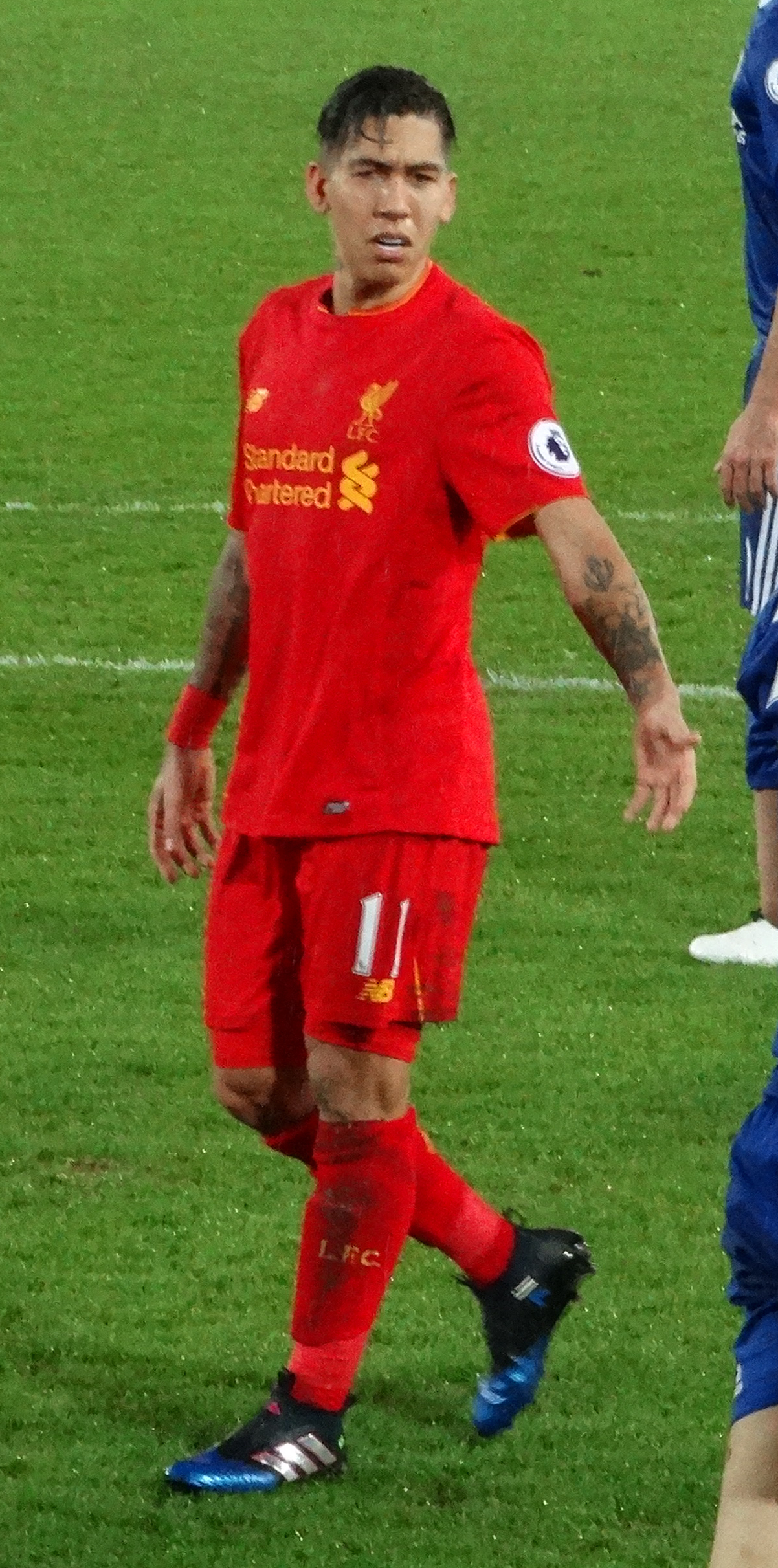
Roberto Firmino is the highest-scoring Brazilian in Premier League history, and won a title with Liverpool

- Alex – Chelsea – 2007–12
- **Alisson** – **Liverpool** – 2018–
- Allan – Everton – 2020–22
- **Allan** – **Manchester City** – 2026–
- Afonso Alves – Middlesbrough – 2007–09
- **Alysson** – **Aston Villa** – 2025–
- Anderson – Manchester United – 2007–15
- Anderson Silva – Everton – 2006–07
- André – Wolverhampton Wanderers – 2024–26
- Antony – Manchester United – 2022–25
- Fábio Aurélio – Liverpool – 2006–11
- Júlio Baptista – Arsenal – 2006–07
- Juliano Belletti – Chelsea – 2007–10
- Bernard – Everton – 2018–21
- Bernardo – Brighton & Hove Albion – 2018–21
- Léo Bonatini – Wolverhampton Wanderers – 2018–19
- Branco – Middlesbrough – 1995–97
- Caçapa – Newcastle United – 2007–09
- Carlos Vinícius – Tottenham Hotspur, Fulham – 2020–21, 2022–24
- Casemiro – Manchester United – 2022–26
- Philippe Coutinho – Liverpool, Aston Villa – 2012–18, 2021–24
- **Jair Cunha** – **Nottingham Forest** – 2025–
- **Matheus Cunha** – Wolverhampton Wanderers, **Manchester United** – 2022–
- Danilo – Manchester City – 2017–19
- Danilo – Nottingham Forest – 2022–25
- David Luiz – Chelsea, Arsenal – 2011–14, 2016–21
- Denílson – Arsenal – 2006–11
- Diego Carlos – Aston Villa – 2022–25
- Guly do Prado – Southampton – 2012–14
- Doni – Liverpool – 2011–12
- Doriva – Middlesbrough – 2002–06
- Douglas Luiz – Aston Villa, Nottingham Forest – 2019–24, 2025–26
- Ederson – Manchester City – 2017–25
- Edu – Arsenal – 2000–05
- Elano – Manchester City – 2007–09
- Emerson – Middlesbrough – 1996–97
- **Emersonn** – **Ipswich Town** – 2026–
- Emerson Royal – Tottenham Hotspur – 2021–24
- **Estêvão Willian** – **Chelsea** – 2025–
- Evandro – Hull City – 2016–17
- **Evanilson** – **Bournemouth** – 2024–
- Fabinho – Liverpool – 2018–23
- Fábio – Manchester United, Queens Park Rangers, Cardiff City, Middlesbrough – 2009–14, 2016–17
- Felipe – Nottingham Forest – 2022–24
- Felipe Anderson – West Ham United – 2018–21
- Fernandinho – Manchester City – 2013–22
- Fernando – Manchester City – 2014–17
- Filipe Luís – Chelsea – 2014–15
- Matheus França – Crystal Palace – 2023–25
- Roberto Firmino – Liverpool – 2015–23
- Fred – Manchester United – 2018–23
- Fumaça – Newcastle United – 1999–2000
- Gabriel Jesus – Manchester City, Arsenal – 2016–26
- **Gabriel Magalhães** – **Arsenal** – 2020–
- Gabriel Martinelli – Arsenal – 2019–26
- Gabriel Paulista – Arsenal – 2014–17
- Geovanni – Manchester City, Hull City – 2007–10
- Gilberto – Tottenham Hotspur – 2007–09
- Gilberto Silva – Arsenal – 2002–08
- Gláuber – Manchester City – 2008–09
- Heurelho Gomes – Tottenham Hotspur, Watford – 2008–11, 2015–18
- **João Gomes** – Wolverhampton Wanderers, **Aston Villa** – 2022–
- Luis Guilherme – West Ham United – 2024–26
- **Bruno Guimarães** – Newcastle United, **Arsenal** – 2021–
- **Igor Jesus** – **Nottingham Forest** – 2025–
- Igor Julio – Brighton & Hove Albion, West Ham United – 2023–26
- **Igor Thiago** – **Brentford** – 2024–
- Ilan – West Ham United – 2009–10
- Isaías – Coventry City – 1995–97
- Mário Jardel – Bolton Wanderers – 2003–04
- Jô – Manchester City, Everton – 2008–11
- **João Pedro** – Watford, Brighton & Hove Albion, **Chelsea** – 2019–20, 2021–22, 2023–
- **Joelinton** – **Newcastle United** – 2019–
- Júlio César – Bolton Wanderers – 2004–05
- Júlio César – Queens Park Rangers – 2012–13
- Juninho – Middlesbrough – 1995–97, 1999–2000, 2002–04
- Kayky – Manchester City – 2021–22
- Kenedy – Chelsea, Watford, Newcastle United – 2015–19, 2021–22
- **Kevin** – **Fulham** – 2025–
- Kléberson – Manchester United – 2003–05
- Pedro Lima – Wolverhampton Wanderers – 2024–26
- Renan Lodi – Nottingham Forest – 2022–23
- Lucas Leiva – Liverpool – 2007–17
- Lucas Moura – Tottenham Hotspur – 2017–23
- Lucas Paquetá – West Ham United – 2022–26
- Lyanco – Southampton – 2021–23
- Maicon – Manchester City – 2012–13
- Fernando Marçal – Wolverhampton Wanderers – 2020–22
- Marquinhos – Arsenal – 2022–23
- Mineiro – Chelsea – 2008–09
- Morato – Nottingham Forest – 2024–26
- **Rodrigo Muniz** – **Fulham** – 2023–
- **Murillo** – **Nottingham Forest** – 2023–
- Nenê – West Ham United – 2014–15
- Neto – Bournemouth – 2022–25
- Gustavo Nunes – Brentford – 2024–25
- Oscar – Chelsea – 2012–17
- Alexandre Pato – Chelsea – 2015–16
- Paulinho – Tottenham Hotspur – 2013–15
- Andreas Pereira – Manchester United, Fulham – 2014–16, 2018–20, 2022–25
- Matheus Pereira – West Bromwich Albion – 2020–21
- Bruno Perone – Queens Park Rangers – 2011–12
- **Lucas Perri** – **Leeds United** – 2025–
- Lucas Piazon – Chelsea – 2012–13
- Lucas Pires – Burnley – 2025–26
- Rafael – Manchester United – 2008–15
- Ramires – Chelsea – 2010–16
- Raphinha – Leeds United – 2020–22
- **Rayan** – **Bournemouth** – 2025–
- **Vitor Reis** – **Manchester City** – 2024–25, 2026–
- **Richarlison** – Watford, Everton, **Tottenham Hotspur** – 2017–
- Douglas Rinaldi – Watford – 2006–07
- Robinho – Manchester City – 2008–10
- Fábio Rochemback – Middlesbrough – 2005–08
- Rodrigo – Everton – 2002–03
- Roque Júnior – Leeds United – 2003–04
- Samir – Watford – 2021–22
- Sandro – Tottenham Hotspur, Queens Park Rangers, West Bromwich Albion – 2010–16
- André Santos – Arsenal – 2011–12
- **Andrey Santos** – Nottingham Forest, Chelsea, **Manchester United** – 2023–24, 2025–
- **Sávio** – Manchester City, **Tottenham Hotspur** – 2024–
- Gustavo Scarpa – Nottingham Forest – 2022–23
- Rafael Schmitz – Birmingham City – 2007–08
- Thiago Silva – Chelsea – 2020–24
- Souza – Tottenham Hotspur – 2025–26
- Vinícius Souza – Sheffield United – 2023–24
- Sylvinho – Arsenal, Manchester City – 1999–2001, 2009–10
- Alex Telles – Manchester United – 2020–22
- Tetê – Leicester City – 2022–23
- Emerson Thome – Sheffield Wednesday, Chelsea, Sunderland, Bolton Wanderers – 1997–2004
- **John Victor** – **Nottingham Forest** – 2025–
- Vitinho – Burnley – 2023–24
- Deivid Washington – Chelsea – 2023–24
- Welington – Southampton – 2024–25
- Wesley – Aston Villa – 2019–22
- Willian (**327**) – Chelsea, Arsenal, Fulham – 2013–21, 2022–25
- Willian José – Wolverhampton Wanderers – 2020–21

=== Chile ===
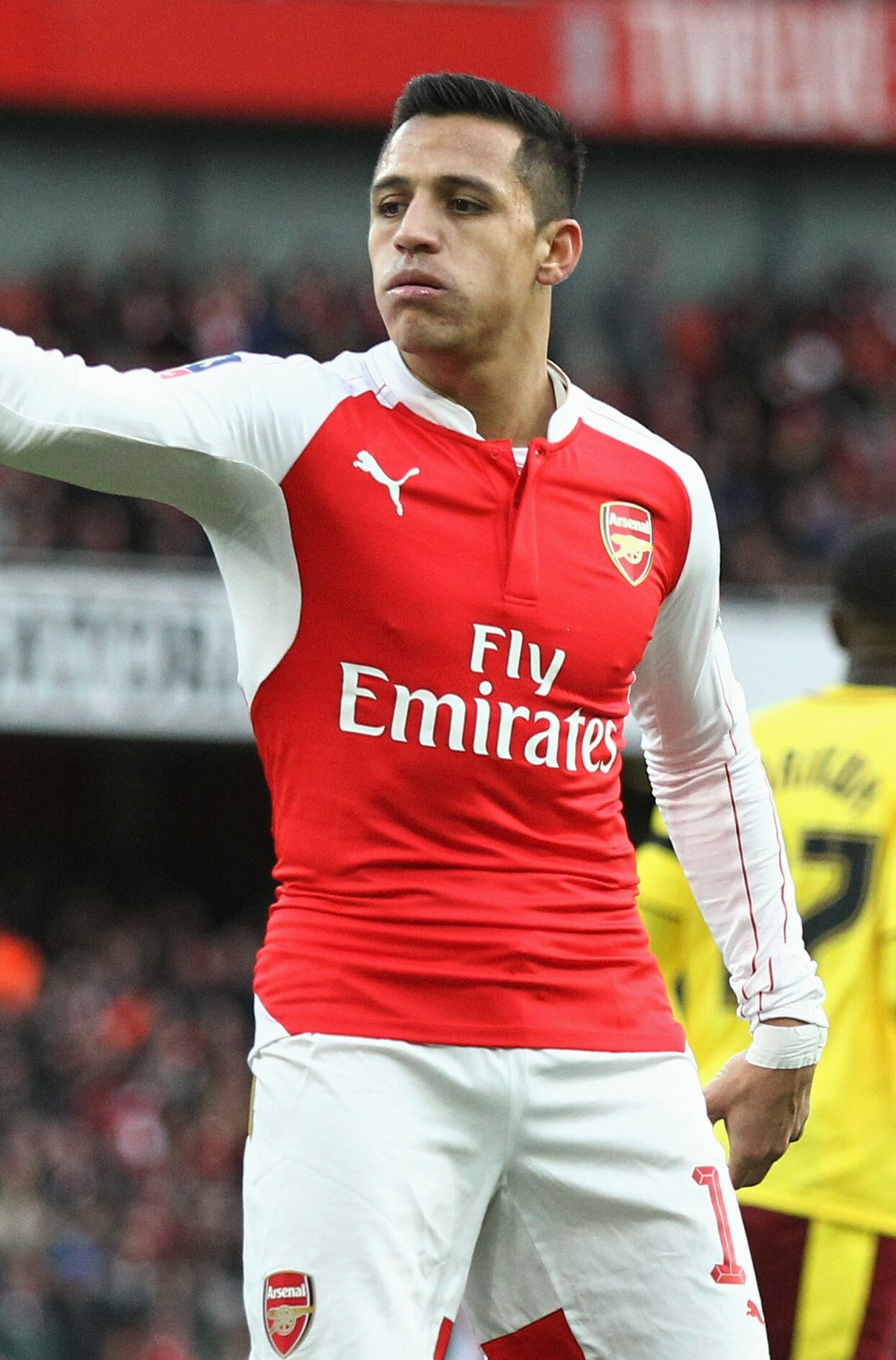
Alexis Sánchez scored 60 Premier League goals for Arsenal

- Clarence Acuña – Newcastle United – 2000–03
- Jean Beausejour – Birmingham City, Wigan Athletic – 2010–13
- Claudio Bravo – Manchester City – 2016–18, 2019–20
- Ben Brereton Díaz – Sheffield United, Southampton – 2023–25
- Mark González – Liverpool – 2006–07
- Ángelo Henríquez – Wigan Athletic – 2012–13
- Mauricio Isla – Queens Park Rangers – 2014–15
- Gonzalo Jara – West Bromwich Albion – 2010–12
- Luis Jiménez – West Ham United – 2009–10
- Javier Margas – West Ham United – 1998–2001
- Gary Medel – Cardiff City – 2013–14
- **Marcelino Núñez** – **Ipswich Town** – 2026–
- **Darío Osorio** – **Crystal Palace** – 2026–
- David Pizarro – Manchester City – 2011–12
- Alexis Sánchez (**154**) – Arsenal, Manchester United – 2014–19
- Francisco Sierralta – Watford – 2021–22
- Eduardo Vargas – Queens Park Rangers – 2014–15
- Carlos Villanueva – Blackburn Rovers – 2008–09

=== Colombia ===
- Steven Alzate – Brighton & Hove Albion – 2019–22
- Juan Pablo Ángel – Aston Villa – 2000–07
- Jhon Arias – Wolverhampton Wanderers – 2025–26
- Pablo Armero – West Ham United – 2013–14
- Faustino Asprilla – Newcastle United – 1995–98
- Juan Cuadrado – Chelsea – 2014–16
- Luis Díaz – Liverpool – 2021–25
- Jhon Durán – Aston Villa – 2022–25
- Bernardo Espinosa – Middlesbrough – 2016–17
- Radamel Falcao – Manchester United, Chelsea – 2014–16
- Cucho Hernández – Watford – 2021–22
- Víctor Ibarbo – Watford – 2015–16
- José Izquierdo – Brighton & Hove Albion – 2017–19, 2020–21
- **Jefferson Lerma** (**194**) – Bournemouth, **Crystal Palace** – 2018–20, 2022–
- Yerry Mina – Everton – 2018–23
- Yerson Mosquera – Wolverhampton Wanderers – 2024–26
- **Daniel Muñoz** – Crystal Palace, **Nottingham Forest** – 2023–
- David Ospina – Arsenal – 2014–18
- Ian Poveda – Leeds United – 2020–21
- Hámilton Ricard – Middlesbrough – 1998–2002
- Hugo Rodallega – Wigan Athletic, Fulham – 2008–14
- James Rodríguez – Everton – 2020–21
- Carlos Sánchez – Aston Villa, West Ham United – 2014–16, 2018–20
- Davinson Sánchez – Tottenham Hotspur – 2017–24
- Luis Sinisterra – Leeds United, Bournemouth – 2022–25
- Jhon Viáfara – Portsmouth – 2005–06
- Juan Camilo Zúñiga – Watford – 2016–17

=== Ecuador ===
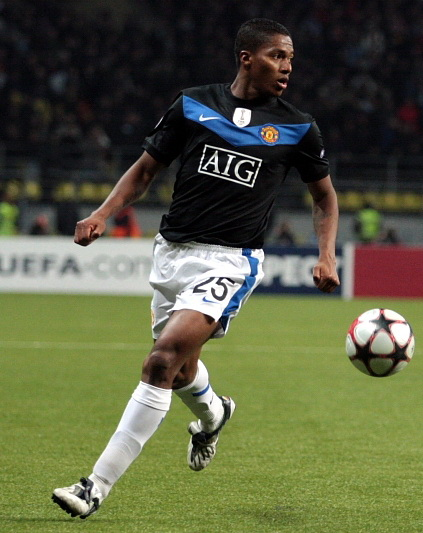
Antonio Valencia won the Premier League twice with Manchester United

- **Juan Riquelme Angulo** – **Sunderland** – 2026–
- **Nilson Angulo** – **Sunderland** – 2025–
- Christian Benítez – Birmingham City – 2009–10
- Felipe Caicedo – Manchester City – 2007–09
- **Moisés Caicedo** – Brighton & Hove Albion, **Chelsea** – 2021–
- Segundo Castillo – Everton, Wolverhampton Wanderers – 2008–10
- Ulises de la Cruz – Aston Villa, Reading – 2002–08
- Agustín Delgado – Southampton – 2001–04
- Pervis Estupiñán – Brighton & Hove Albion – 2022–25
- Fernando Guerrero – Burnley – 2009–10
- **Piero Hincapié** – **Arsenal** – 2025–
- Iván Kaviedes – Crystal Palace – 2004–05
- Jefferson Montero – Swansea City – 2014–17
- Juan Carlos Paredes – Watford – 2015–16
- Jeremy Sarmiento – Brighton & Hove Albion – 2021–23, 2024–25
- Antonio Valencia (**325**) – Wigan Athletic, Manchester United – 2006–19
- Enner Valencia – West Ham United, Everton – 2014–17

=== Paraguay ===
- Antolín Alcaraz – Wigan Athletic, Everton – 2010–15
- **Omar Alderete** – **Sunderland** – 2025–
- Miguel Almirón (**186**) – Newcastle United – 2018–25
- Fabián Balbuena – West Ham United – 2018–21
- Paulo da Silva – Sunderland – 2009–11
- **Julio Enciso** – Brighton & Hove Albion, **Ipswich Town** – 2022–25, 2026–
- Diego Gavilán – Newcastle United – 1999–2001
- **Diego Gómez** – **Brighton & Hove Albion** – 2024–
- Enso González – Wolverhampton Wanderers – 2023–24
- Juan Iturbe – Bournemouth – 2015–16
- Cristian Riveros – Sunderland – 2010–11
- Roque Santa Cruz – Blackburn Rovers, Manchester City – 2007–11
- Ramón Sosa – Nottingham Forest – 2024–25

=== Peru ===
- André Carrillo – Watford – 2017–18
- Diego Penny – Burnley – 2008–10
- Claudio Pizarro – Chelsea – 2007–09
- Nolberto Solano (**302**) – Newcastle United, Aston Villa, West Ham United – 1998–2008
- Oliver Sonne – Burnley – 2025–26
- Ysrael Zúñiga – Coventry City – 1999–2001

=== Uruguay ===
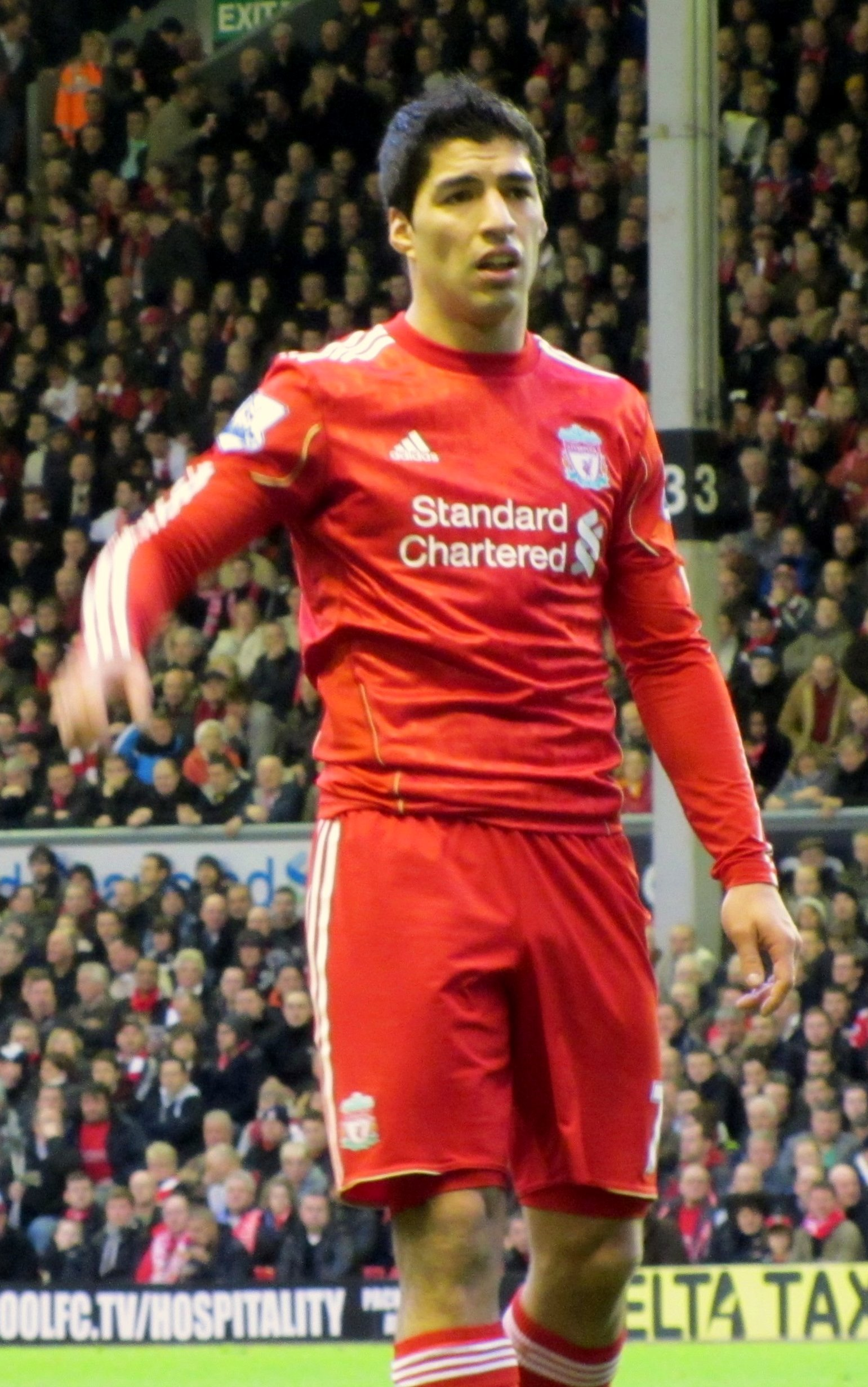
Luis Suárez was the top scorer in the 2013–14 Premier League, with a then record-equalling 31 goals

- **Ronald Araujo** – **Liverpool** – 2026–
- **Rodrigo Bentancur** – **Tottenham Hotspur** – 2021–
- Miguel Britos – Watford – 2015–19
- Santiago Bueno – Wolverhampton Wanderers – 2023–26
- Martín Cáceres – Southampton – 2016–17
- Edinson Cavani – Manchester United – 2020–22
- Sebastián Coates – Liverpool, Sunderland – 2011–13, 2014–16
- Diego Forlán – Manchester United – 2001–05
- Ignacio María González – Newcastle United – 2008–09
- Abel Hernández – Hull City – 2014–15, 2016–17
- Walter Alberto López – West Ham United – 2008–09
- Diego Lugano – West Bromwich Albion – 2013–14
- Williams Martínez – West Bromwich Albion – 2005–06
- Darwin Núñez – Liverpool – 2022–25
- Walter Pandiani – Birmingham City – 2004–06
- Adrián Paz – Ipswich Town – 1994–95
- Facundo Pellistri – Manchester United – 2022–24
- Omar Pouso – Charlton Athletic – 2006–07
- Diego Poyet – West Ham United – 2014–15
- Gus Poyet (**187**) – Chelsea, Tottenham Hotspur – 1997–2004
- Gastón Ramírez – Southampton, Hull City, Middlesbrough – 2012–17
- **Álvaro Rodríguez** – **Bournemouth** – 2026–
- Darío Silva – Portsmouth – 2005–06
- Gonzalo Sorondo – Crystal Palace, Charlton Athletic – 2004–07
- Cristhian Stuani – Middlesbrough – 2016–17
- Luis Suárez – Liverpool – 2010–14
- Lucas Torreira – Arsenal – 2018–20
- **Manuel Ugarte** – **Manchester United** – 2024–
- Guillermo Varela – Manchester United – 2015–16
- Matías Viña – Bournemouth – 2022–23

=== Venezuela ===
- Fernando Amorebieta – Fulham – 2013–14
- Salomón Rondón (**167**) – West Bromwich Albion, Newcastle United, Everton – 2015–19, 2021–23

== Notes ==
1. Born in Algeria
2. Born in Angola
3. Born in Angola (then Portuguese Angola)
4. Born in Argentina
5. Born in Australia
6. Born in Austria
7. Born in Burundi
8. Born in Belgium
9. Born in Bosnia and Herzegovina (then part of Yugoslavia)
10. Born in Brazil
11. Born in the Central African Republic
12. Born in Canada
13. Born in Cameroon
14. Born in Cape Verde
15. Born in Chad
16. Born in Croatia (then part of Yugoslavia)
17. Born in Curaçao (constituent country of the Kingdom of the Netherlands [then part of the Netherlands Antilles])
18. Born in Denmark
19. Born in Dominican Republic
20. Born in Democratic Republic of Congo
21. Born in England
22. Born in France
23. Born in the French Guiana (Overseas department of the French Republic)
24. Born in The Gambia
25. Born in West Germany (now part of Germany)
26. Born in Guinea-Bissau
27. Born in Germany
28. Born in Ghana
29. Born in Guadeloupe (Overseas department of the French Republic)
30. Born in Greece
31. Born in Greenland (autonomous country within the Kingdom of Denmark)
32. Born in French Guiana (Overseas department of the French Republic)
33. Born in Haiti
34. Born in Iraq
35. Born in Italy
36. Born in the Ivory Coast
37. Born in Jamaica
38. Born in Kosovo (then part of Yugoslavia)
39. Born in Liberia
40. Born in Mali
41. Born in Monaco
42. Born in Morocco
43. Born in Mozambique (then Portuguese Mozambique)
44. Born in Martinique (Overseas department of the French Republic)
45. Born in New Caledonia (Overseas territory of the French Republic)
46. Born in the Netherlands
47. Born in Nigeria
48. Born in Northern Ireland
49. Born in North Macedonia (then Macedonia, part of Yugoslavia)
50. Born in Paraguay
51. Born in Poland
52. Born in Portugal
53. Born in Réunion (Overseas department of the French Republic)
54. Born in Republic of Ireland
55. Born in Russia (then part of the Soviet Union)
56. Born in São Tomé and Príncipe
57. Born in South Africa
58. Born in Scotland
59. Born in Senegal
60. Born in Slovakia
61. Born in Slovenia
62. Born in Somalia
63. Born in Spain
64. Born in Serbia and Montenegro
65. Born in Serbia (then part of Yugoslavia)
66. Born in Switzerland
67. Born in Suriname
68. Born in Suriname (then part of the Kingdom of the Netherlands)
69. Born in Slovakia (then part of Czechoslovakia)
70. Born in Slovenia (then part of Yugoslavia)
71. Born in Sweden
72. Born in Syria
73. Born in Uganda
74. Born in Ukraine (then part of the Soviet Union)
75. Born in the United States
76. Born in Uzbekistan (then part of the Soviet Union)
77. Born in the Democratic Republic of Congo (then Zaïre)
78. Bosnian Croat. Born in Bosnia and Herzegovina (then part of Yugoslavia)
79. Bosnian Serb. Born in Bosnia and Herzegovina (then part of Yugoslavia)
80. Capped for the Andalusia national football team
81. Capped for the Albania national football team
82. Capped for the Argentina national under-20 football team
83. Capped for the Austria national under-17 football team
84. Capped for the Basque Country national football team
85. Capped for the Belgium national under-17 football team
86. Capped for the Belgium national under-21 football team
87. Capped for the Belgium national football team
88. Capped for the Bosnia and Herzegovina national under-21 football team
89. Capped for the Brazil national under-17 football team
90. Capped for the Brazil national under-20 football team
91. Capped for the Brazil national football team
92. Capped for the Brittany national football team
93. Capped for the Canada national under-20 football team
94. Capped for the Catalonia national football team
95. Capped for the Cayman Islands national football team
96. Capped for the Corsica national football team
97. Capped for the Czechoslovakia national football team
98. Capped for the Denmark national under-21 football team
99. Capped for the Dominican Republic national football team
100. Capped for the DR Congo national football team
101. Capped for the England national football B team
102. Capped for the England national football C team
103. Capped for the England national under-16 football team
104. Capped for the England national under-17 football team
105. Capped for the England national under-18 football team
106. Capped for the England national under-19 football team
107. Capped for the England national under-20 football team
108. Capped for the England national under-21 football team
109. Capped for the England national football team
110. Capped for the Equatorial Guinea national football team
111. Capped for the France national under-16 football team
112. Capped for the France national under-17 football team
113. Capped for the France national under-18 football team
114. Capped for the France national under-19 football team
115. Capped for the France national under-20 football team
116. Capped for the France national under-21 football team
117. Capped for the Galicia national football team
118. Capped for the Germany national under-15 football team
119. Capped for the Germany national under-18 football team
120. Capped for the Germany national under-20 football team
121. Capped for the Germany national under-21 football team
122. Capped for the Germany national football team
123. Capped for the Great Britain men's Olympic football team
124. Capped for the Guadeloupe national football team
125. Capped for the French Guiana national football team
126. Capped for the Republic of Ireland national under-19 football team
127. Capped for the Italy national under-21 football team
128. Capped for the Morocco national football team
129. Capped for the Montenegro national under-21 football team
130. Capped for the Martinique national football team
131. Capped for the Netherlands Antilles national football team
132. Capped for the Netherlands national football team
133. Capped for the Netherlands national under-15 football team
134. Capped for the Netherlands national under-20 football team
135. Capped for the Netherlands national under-21 football team
136. Capped for the Nigeria national under-23 football team
137. Capped for the Northern Ireland national football B team
138. Capped for the North Macedonia national under-17 football team (then Macedonia)
139. Capped for the Northern Ireland national under-21 football team
140. Capped for the Norway national under-21 football team
141. Capped for the Poland national under-18 football team
142. Capped for the Portugal national football team
143. Capped for the Portugal national under-19 football team
144. Capped for the Portugal national under-21 football team
145. Capped for the Portugal national under-21 football team
146. Capped for the Romania national under-17 football team
147. Capped for the Samoa national under-20 football team (then Western Samoa)
148. Capped for the Scotland national football B team
149. Capped for the Scotland national under-19 football team
150. Capped for the Scotland national under-21 football team
151. Capped for the Serbia and Montenegro national football team
152. Capped for the Serbia national under-19 football team
153. Capped for the Spain national football team
154. Capped for the Spain national under-18 football team
155. Capped for the Spain national under-19 football team
156. Capped for the Spain national under-21 football team
157. Capped for the Sweden men's national football team
158. Capped for the Sweden men's national under-17 football team
159. Capped for the Switzerland national under-16 football team
160. Capped for the Switzerland national under-17 football team
161. Capped for the Switzerland national under-18 football team
162. Capped for the Switzerland national under-21 football team
163. Capped for the Switzerland national football team
164. Capped for the Turkey national under-21 football team
165. Capped for the United States boys' national under-15 soccer team
166. Kosovo Albanian. Born in Kosovo (then part of Yugoslavia)
167. Yugoslavia while active
