= Shane O'Connor (footballer) =

Irish footballer

Personal information
- Full name: Shane Edward O'Connor
- Date of birth: 14 April 1990 (age 36)
- Place of birth: Cork, Ireland
- Height: 1.75 m (5 ft 9 in)
- Positions: Left back; winger

Youth career
- Wilton United
- Rockmount
- 2006–2009: Liverpool

Senior career*
Years	Team	Apps	(Gls)
2009–2012	Ipswich Town	17	(0)
2011–2012	→ Port Vale (loan)	0	(0)
2012	Cork City	5	(0)
2012	Shamrock Rovers	3	(0)
2013–2014	Portadown	10	(0)
2014	Limerick	11	(0)
2015–2016	Cobh Ramblers	50	(9)
2017	Waterford	23	(4)
2018	Longford Town	3	(0)
2018–2019	Cobh Ramblers	12	(1)
Total		134	(14)

International career
- Republic of Ireland U17
- Republic of Ireland U19
2011	Republic of Ireland U21	1	(0)
- * Club domestic league appearances and goals

Shane O'Connor (born 14 April 1990) is an Irish former professional footballer.

A graduate of the Liverpool F.C. Academy, he signed professionally with Ipswich Town in July 2009. He represented the Republic of Ireland at under-17, under-19, and under-21 levels. He joined Port Vale on a six-week loan spell in November 2011, though he did not make a first-team appearance. He left Ipswich in January 2012 and subsequently had spells signed with Cork City, Shamrock Rovers, Portadown, Limerick, Cobh Ramblers, Waterford and Longford Town. He helped the Waterford to win promotion as champions of the League of Ireland First Division in 2017. He spent the first half of 2018 with Longford Town, rejoining Cobh Ramblers in July 2018.

== Club career ==
=== Early career ===
O'Connor played for Wilton United and Rockmount before joining the Liverpool Academy as a 16-year-old. He started playing regularly for the under-18 side in the early 2008–09 Premier Academy League season.

=== Ipswich Town ===
In July 2009, after a short trial O'Connor signed a one-year deal with Championship side Ipswich Town, who were managed by his boyhood hero, Roy Keane. O'Connor made his debut for Ipswich in the League Cup away against Shrewsbury Town, replacing Jack Ainsley as a substitute at half-time; the "Tractor Boys" went on to win the match on penalties following a 3–3 draw. He made his first league start for Ipswich on 20 February, in a 1–0 win over Sheffield Wednesday at Hillsborough. He played a further eleven league games for Ipswich in 2009–10; he impressed in midfield against Cardiff City, though gave away a penalty in a draw at home to Doncaster Rovers. At the end of the campaign he was handed a new two-year deal, which he eventually signed. However, experienced player Mark Kennedy was also signed for a £75,000 fee, and was expected to battle O'Connor for the left-back spot.

He appeared in five of the club's first six games of 2010–11. He was then dropped from the first-team after suffering from a tore hamstring on international duty, and did not play again until a three-game spell in December. He set up Jason Scotland for Ipswich's third in a 3–0 win over Leicester City at Portman Road on 18 December. However, he ruptured and dislocated his shoulder joint, and so did not appear again until 25 January, in a 3–0 League Cup semi-final defeat to Arsenal at the Emirates Stadium. This was his last contribution to the campaign, and he was not selected again under Paul Jewell's stewardship, with whom he had a poor relationship.

At the start of the 2011–12 season, he rejected a six-month loan deal at Crawley Town. However, he did not feature for Ipswich, and so in November 2011, he joined Crawley's League Two rivals Port Vale on loan. He saw the loan as an opportunity to win a permanent contract away from Portman Road. He played a number of reserve team games, but never made a matchday squad at Vale Park before his loan spell ended in January; he felt disillusioned upon his arrival at the club when manager Micky Adams asked him what position he played. He then had a trial with Southend United, also of League Two, before leaving Ipswich Town by mutual consent on 20 January. He later admitted he struggled with depression and problem gambling after leaving the English professional football scene, and as a result lost 50% of the footballing ability he had at Ipswich.

I always felt like a failure, to be honest, and it's something I've found very, very difficult to get over. It's not yet something I can see as an achievement... The margin is slim and I came out on the wrong side of it. I could have done more. I should have done more. There was some bad luck, but I could have done a few things differently too. I left something behind me and that's not an easy thing to come to terms with.

— Speaking in September 2018, O'Connor said that he was still unable to take any pride in his football career.

=== League of Ireland ===
He was linked with a move into Irish football, as both Dundalk and Shamrock Rovers expressed an interest in acquiring his services. He was revealed as a Cork City player on 2 February 2012. He made only five league appearances for the "Leesiders". He went on trial at Crawley Town in July 2012.

O'Connor signed for Shamrock Rovers on 31 July. He made his competitive debut for Rovers in the final of the 2012 Leinster Senior Cup, which ended in a 1–0 win over St Patrick's CY. He made his League of Ireland debut against Bohemians the following week, and made a total of five appearances for the "Hoops". O'Connor signed with Portadown in October 2013. He spent the 2014 season with Limerick, playing 11 League of Ireland Premier Division games. He dropped into the League of Ireland First Division to play for Cobh Ramblers in January 2015. He was voted the club's Player of the Year for the 2015 season. He went on to score nine goals in 26 league appearances during the 2016 campaign.

In January 2017, he signed for First Division rivals Waterford. He also began working machinery operative at Dublin Port. He made his debut in a 1–0 defeat at Athlone Town on 24 February. He scored his first goal for the "Blues" in a 1–1 draw at Shelbourne on 30 June. On 21 July, O'Connor scored twice against former side Cobh Ramblers in a 4–0 win that put Waterford nine points clear of Cobh Ramblers and UCD at the top of the table with just seven games to play in the division. O'Connor continued his run of form with the winning goal in a 1–0 victory over UCD on 18 August. Waterford were crowned First Division champions following a 3–0 victory over Wexford, finishing eight points ahead of second-placed Cobh Ramblers, and promoted back to the Premier Division. O'Connor finished the 2017 season with 26 appearances and four goals to his name, and was voted as the club's Player of the Year by the members of the Blues Supporters Club.

On 18 January 2018, O'Connor signed a one-year contract with First Division side Longford Town. Injury restricted him to just three appearances before he left Strokestown Road in June 2018. He then relocated to work as a courier for the Health Service Executive. He re-joined Cobh Ramblers in July 2018 and featured four times in the 2018 season, including an appearance in the 2018 League of Ireland Cup final defeat to Derry City at Brandywell Stadium; his penalty was saved by Gerard Doherty in the last kick of the game and the score ended as 3–1 to Derry.

== International career ==
He made his debut appearance for the Republic of Ireland national under-21 team on 26 March 2011, in what ended as a 2–1 defeat to Portugal at the Estádio Municipal de Águeda; he was replaced by Ipswich teammate Conor Hourihane at half-time. He previously appeared for the under-17 and under-19 side.

== Career statistics ==
Appearances and goals by club, season and competition
Club	Season	League			National cup (Note: Includes FA Cup, FAI Cup, Irish Cup)		League cup (Note: Includes Football League Cup, League of Ireland Cup, Northern Ireland Football League Cup)		Other		Total	
Club	Season	Division	Apps	Goals	Apps	Goals	Apps	Goals	Apps	Goals	Apps	Goals
Ipswich Town	2009–10	Championship	12	0	0	0	1	0	—		13	0
Ipswich Town	2010–11	Championship	5	0	0	0	4	0	—		9	0
Ipswich Town	2011–12	Championship	0	0	0	0	0	0	—		0	0
Ipswich Town	Total		17	0	0	0	5	0	0	0	22	0
Port Vale (loan)	2011–12	League Two	0	0	—		—		—		0	0
Cork City	2012	LOI Premier Division	5	0	0	0	2	0	0	0	7	0
Shamrock Rovers	2012	LOI Premier Division	3	0	1	0	0	0	0	0	4	0
Portadown	2013–14	NIFL Premiership	10	0	0	0	1	0	0	0	11	0
Limerick	2014	LOI Premier Division	11	0	0	0	0	0	0	0	11	0
Cobh Ramblers	2015	LOI First Division	24	0	0	0	2	0	0	0	26	0
Cobh Ramblers	2016	LOI First Division	26	9	1	0	1	0	0	0	28	9
Cobh Ramblers	Total		50	9	1	0	3	0	0	0	54	9
Waterford	2017	LOI First Division	23	4	0	0	3	0	0	0	26	4
Longford Town	2018	LOI First Division	3	0	0	0	0	0	0	0	3	0
Cobh Ramblers	2018	LOI First Division	3	0	0	0	1	0	0	0	4	0
Cobh Ramblers	2019	LOI First Division	9	1	0	0	2	0	0	0	11	1
Cobh Ramblers	Total		12	1	0	0	3	0	0	0	15	1
Career total			134	14	2	0	17	0	0	0	153	14

== Honours ==
Waterford

- League of Ireland First Division: 2017

Cobh Ramblers

- League of Ireland Cup runner-up: 2018

Individual

- Cobh Ramblers Player of the Year: 2015
- Waterford Player of the Year: 2017
