= 2009–10 Ipswich Town F.C. season =

Ipswich Town
2009–10 season
- Chairman: Marcus Evans
- Manager: Roy Keane
- Stadium: Portman Road
- Championship: 15th
- FA Cup: Fourth round
- League Cup: Second round
- Top goalscorer: League: Jonathan Walters (8); All: Jonathan Walters (8)
- Highest home attendance: 27,059 (vs Newcastle United, 26 Sep 2009, Championship)
- Lowest home attendance: 19,283 (vs Watford, 20 Oct 2009, Championship)
- Average home league attendance: 20,840
Home colours	Away colours	Third colours

During the 2009–10 English football season, Ipswich Town competed in the Football League Championship.

The 2009–10 football season marked the 131st year of existence of Ipswich Town Football Club. Additionally, it marked the club's 74th anniversary of turning professional and was the club's 71st consecutive season in the English football league system.

The 2009–10 season was Roy Keane's first full season as manager of Ipswich Town. Ipswich Town competed in the Football League Championship, finishing 15th out of the 24 teams. The club also competed in the Football League Cup, where it was eliminated in the second round, and the FA Cup, where it was eliminated in the fourth round.

== Players ==
=== First-team squad ===
Squad at end of season

Note: Flags indicate national team as defined under FIFA eligibility rules; some limited exceptions apply. Players may hold more than one non-FIFA nationality.

No.	Pos.	Nation	Player
1	GK	ENG	Richard Wright
2	DF	ENG	David Wright
3	DF	IRL	Damien Delaney
4	DF	NIR	Gareth McAuley
6	MF	ENG	Grant Leadbitter
7	MF	IRL	Owen Garvan
8	MF	ENG	Lee Martin
9	FW	ESP	Pablo Couñago
10	MF	ENG	David Norris
12	DF	CAN	Jaime Peters
17	MF	ENG	Jack Colback (on loan from Sunderland)

No.	Pos.	Nation	Player
19	FW	IRL	Jonathan Walters (captain) (Note: Walters was born in Moreton, England, but also qualified to represent Republic of Ireland internationally through his mother and represented them at U-21 and B level before making his international debut for the Republic of Ireland in November 2010.)
20	FW	NIR	David Healy (on loan from Sunderland)
21	FW	IRL	Daryl Murphy (on loan from Sunderland)
23	MF	TRI	Carlos Edwards
25	MF	IRL	Alan Quinn
26	GK	IRL	Brian Murphy
28	GK	ENG	Arran Lee-Barrett
30	DF	IRL	Shane O'Connor
35	DF	NZL	Tommy Smith (Note: Smith was born in Macclesfield, England, and represented them at U-17 and U-18 level, but was also raised in New Zealand and made his international debut for New Zealand in March 2010.)
40	FW	ENG	Connor Wickham

=== Left club during season ===
Note: Flags indicate national team as defined under FIFA eligibility rules; some limited exceptions apply. Players may hold more than one non-FIFA nationality.

No.	Pos.	Nation	Player
5	DF	IRL	Alex Bruce (Note: Bruce was born in Norwich, England, but also qualified to represent Northern Ireland and the Republic of Ireland internationally through his grandmother and represented the Republic of Ireland at U-21 and B level before making his international debut for the Republic of Ireland in May 2007; he would change his international allegiance to Northern Ireland in July 2011 and make his international debut for Northern Ireland in February 2013.) (on loan to Leicester City)
11	FW	JAM	Kevin Lisbie (Note: Lisbie was born in Hackney, England, but also qualified to represent Jamaica internationally and made his international debut for Jamaica in 2002.) (on loan to Colchester United)
14	FW	ENG	Jon Stead (on loan to Coventry City)
15	DF	NED	Pim Balkestein (on loan to Brentford)
16	FW	HUN	Tamás Priskin (Note: Priskin was born in Komárno, Czechoslovakia (now Slovakia), but also qualified to represent Hungary internationally and made his international debut for Hungary in August 2005.) (on loan to Queens Park Rangers)
18	MF	IRL	Colin Healy (on loan to Falkirk)

No.	Pos.	Nation	Player
21	FW	TRI	Stern John (on loan from Crystal Palace)
22	DF	ENG	Liam Rosenior (on loan from Reading)
27	GK	IRL	Shane Supple (retired)
27	GK	BIH	Asmir Begović (Note: Begović was born in Trebinje, SFR Yugoslavia (now Bosnia and Herzegovina), but also qualified to represent Canada internationally and represented them at U-20 level before making his international debut for Bosnia and Herzegovina in October 2009.) (on loan from Portsmouth)
36	MF	ENG	Liam Trotter (on loan to Millwall)

=== Reserve squad ===
Note: Flags indicate national team as defined under FIFA eligibility rules; some limited exceptions apply. Players may hold more than one non-FIFA nationality.

No.	Pos.	Nation	Player
13	MF	ARG	Luciano Civelli
29	MF	ENG	Ed Upson
31	MF	USA	Devann Yao
32	GK	IRL	Ian McLoughlin
33	DF	WAL	Ben Thatcher (Note: Thatcher was born in Swindon, England, and represented them at U-21 level, but also qualified to represent Wales internationally through his grandmother and made his debut for Wales in March 2004.)
34	DF	ENG	Jack Ainsley

No.	Pos.	Nation	Player
37	MF	BER	Reggie Lambe
39	DF	WAL	Troy Brown (Note: Brown was born in Croydon, England, but also qualified to represent Wales internationally and represented them at U-17, U-19 and U-21 level.)
41	DF	ENG	Tom Eastman
42	MF	ENG	Billy Clark
44	FW	IRL	Ronan Murray
46	MF	ENG	Luke Hyam

== Coaching staff ==
Position	Name
Manager	(Republic of Ireland) Roy Keane
Assistant Manager	(England) Tony Loughlan
Assistant Manager	(Scotland) Ian McParland
Goalkeeping Coach	(England) James Hollman
Specialist Skills Coach	(England) Steve Foley
Fitness Coach	(Spain) Antonio Gomez
Fitness Coach	(England) Simon Thadani
Head Physiotherapist	(England) Matt Byard

== Pre-season ==
Ipswich traveled to the Republic of Ireland for pre-season in 2009, playing friendlies against Irish sides Finn Harps, Waterford and Cork City. The squad also spent time in Portugal on a four-day training camp. On the 25 July Ipswich played Colchester United in a testimonial match for retired former player Fabian Wilnis, a match which Ipswich won 2–0.

=== Legend ===
Win	Draw	Loss

Date	Opponent	Venue	Result	Attendance	Scorers
7 July 2009	Finn Harps	A	1–2	Unknown	Wickham (pen)
15 July 2009	Brentford	A	3–1	Unknown	Martin, Wickham, Rhodes
17 July 2009	Waterford	A	3–0	Unknown	Garvan (2), Lisbie
19 July 2009	Cork City	A	0–2	3,262	
22 July 2009	Southend United	A	2–0	Unknown	Trotter (2)
25 July 2009	Colchester United	H	2–0	Unknown	Okuonghae (o.g.), Rhodes
28 July 2009	Charlton Athletic	A	1–2	Unknown	Norris
31 July 2009	Real Valladolid	H	3–1	5,873	Balkestein, Wickham, Prieto (o.g.)

== Competitions ==
=== Football League Championship ===
==== League table ====
Pos	Team	Pld	W	D	L	GF	GA	GD	Pts
13	Queens Park Rangers	46	14	15	17	58	65	−7	57
14	Derby County	46	15	11	20	53	63	−10	56
15	Ipswich Town	46	12	20	14	50	61	−11	56
16	Watford	46	14	12	20	61	68	−7	54
17	Preston North End	46	13	15	18	58	73	−15	54

Source: The Football League
Rules for classification: 1) points; 2) goal difference; 3) number of goals scored.

Overall								Home						Away					
Pld	W	D	L	GF	GA	GD	Pts	W	D	L	GF	GA	GD	W	D	L	GF	GA	GD
46	12	20	14	50	61	−11	56	8	11	4	24	23	+1	4	9	10	26	38	−12

Source: Table

==== Legend ====
Win	Draw	Loss

Ipswich Town's score comes first

==== Matches ====
Date	Opponent	Venue	Result	Attendance	Scorers
9 August 2009	Coventry City	A	1–2	16,279	Walters
15 August 2009	Leicester City	H	0–0	22,454	
18 August 2009	Crystal Palace	H	1–3	20,348	Bruce
22 August 2009	West Bromwich Albion	A	0–2	19,390	
29 August 2009	Preston North End	H	1–1	19,454	Walters
12 September 2009	Middlesbrough	A	1–3	19,742	Walters (pen)
15 September 2009	Nottingham Forest	H	1–1	21,130	Leadbitter
19 September 2009	Doncaster Rovers	A	3–3	10,711	Colback, Priskin, Martin
26 September 2009	Newcastle United	H	0–4	27,059	
29 September 2009	Sheffield United	A	3–3	28,366	Walters, Leadbitter, McAuley
3 October 2009	Barnsley	A	1–2	12,224	Rosenior
17 October 2009	Swansea City	H	1–1	19,667	Couñago
20 October 2009	Watford	H	1–1	19,283	McAuley
24 October 2009	Plymouth Argyle	A	1–1	10,875	Stead
31 October 2009	Derby County	H	1–0	20,299	Wright
7 November 2009	Reading	A	1–1	19,053	Stead
21 November 2009	Sheffield Wednesday	H	0–0	19,636	
29 November 2009	Cardiff City	A	2–1	19,463	Walters, Stead
5 December 2009	Bristol City	A	0–0	14,287	
8 December 2009	Peterborough United	H	0–0	19,975	
12 December 2009	Blackpool	H	3–1	19,831	Stead, Colback, McAuley
26 December 2009	Crystal Palace	A	1–3	16,496	Peters
28 December 2009	Queens Park Rangers	H	3–0	25,349	Walters, Stead (2)
10 January 2010	Leicester City	A	1–1	20,758	Norris
16 January 2010	Coventry City	H	3–2	20,135	John, Colback, Couñago
26 January 2010	West Bromwich Albion	H	1–1	19,574	Leadbitter
30 January 2010	Preston North End	A	0–2	12,087	
6 February 2010	Middlesbrough	H	1–1	21,243	Murphy
9 February 2010	Queens Park Rangers	A	2–1	10,940	Norris, Murphy
16 February 2010	Peterborough United	A	1–3	9,428	Murphy
20 February 2010	Sheffield Wednesday	A	1–0	21,641	Edwards
23 February 2010	Scunthorpe United	A	1–1	5,828	Healy
27 February 2010	Bristol City	H	0–0	20,302	
6 March 2010	Blackpool	A	0–1	8,635	
9 March 2010	Cardiff City	H	2–0	19,997	Murphy (2)
13 March 2010	Scunthorpe United	H	1–0	19,378	Wickham
16 March 2010	Watford	A	1–2	13,996	Colback
20 March 2010	Barnsley	H	1–0	20,558	Murphy
23 March 2010	Plymouth Argyle	H	0–2	19,316	
27 March 2010	Swansea City	A	0–0	14,902	
3 April 2010	Reading	H	2–1	21,403	McAuley, Walters
5 April 2010	Derby County	A	3–1	28,137	McAuley, Edwards, Wickham
10 April 2010	Nottingham Forest	A	0–3	23,459	
17 April 2010	Doncaster Rovers	H	1–1	19,943	Wickham
24 April 2010	Newcastle United	A	2–2	52,181	Wickham, Walters
2 May 2010	Sheffield United	H	0–3	23,003	

=== FA Cup ===
As in the League Cup, Ipswich only progressed through one round of the FA Cup, falling to a 2–1 defeat against Southampton at St Mary's. This meant Ipswich was only left with trying to improve its league position.

Round	Date	Opponent	Venue	Result	Scorers	Attendance	Ref.
Third	2 January	Blackpool	Bloomfield Road	2–1	Colback 3', Garvan 77'	7,332	
Fourth	23 January	Southampton	St Mary's	1–2	Couñago 90'	20,446	

=== League Cup ===
Ipswich Town's League Cup campaign was disappointing. After winning a thrilling first round tie against Shrewsbury Town, Ipswich was knocked out of the competition by Peterborough United at London Road after Ipswich striker Tamas Priskin missed a vital penalty.

Round	Date	Opponent	Venue	Result	Scorers	Attendance	Ref.
First	11 August	Shrewsbury Town	New Meadow	3–3 (won 4–2 on Penalties)	Wickham (2) 11', 59', Quinn 32'	4,184	
Second	25 August	Peterborough United	London Road	1–2	Priskin 14'	5,451	

== Transfers ==
=== Transfers in ===
Date	Pos	Name	From	Fee	Ref
1 July 2009	DF	(Wales) Troy Brown	(England) Fulham	Free transfer	
2 July 2009	DF	(Republic of Ireland) Damien Delaney	(England) Queens Park Rangers	Undisclosed	
6 July 2009	MF	(England) Lee Martin	(England) Manchester United	£1,500,000	
24 July 2009	MF	(Republic of Ireland) Colin Healy	(Republic of Ireland) Cork City	Undisclosed	
27 July 2009	DF	(Republic of Ireland) Shane O'Connor	(England) Liverpool	Free transfer	
6 August 2009	FW	(Hungary) Tamás Priskin	(England) Watford	£1,200,000	
21 August 2009	GK	(England) Arran Lee-Barrett	(England) Hartlepool United	Free transfer	
1 September 2009	MF	(Trinidad and Tobago) Carlos Edwards	(England) Sunderland	£1,350,000	
1 September 2009	MF	(England) Grant Leadbitter	(England) Sunderland	£2,600,000	
6 November 2009	GK	(Republic of Ireland) Brian Murphy	(Republic of Ireland) Bohemian	Free transfer	

- Total transfer spending: £6,650,000+

=== Loans in ===
Date from	Pos	Name	From	Date until	Ref
6 August 2009	MF	(England) Jack Colback	(England) Sunderland	30 June 2010	
14 October 2009	GK	(Bosnia and Herzegovina) Asmir Begović	(England) Portsmouth	23 November 2009	
26 November 2009	FW	(Trinidad and Tobago) Stern John	(England) Crystal Palace	1 February 2010	
2 September 2009	DF	(England) Liam Rosenior	(England) Reading	1 June 2010	
1 February 2010	FW	(Republic of Ireland) Daryl Murphy	(England) Sunderland	30 June 2010	
1 February 2010	FW	(Northern Ireland) David Healy	(England) Sunderland	30 June 2010	

=== Transfers out ===
Date	Pos	Name	To	Fee	Ref
8 May 2009	MF	(England) Tommy Miller	(England) Sheffield Wednesday	Free transfer	
8 May 2009	DF	(Northern Ireland) Chris Casement	(Scotland) Dundee United	Free transfer	
8 May 2009	FW	(England) Dean Bowditch	(England) Yeovil Town	Free transfer	
8 May 2009	DF	(Spain) Iván Campo	(Cyprus) AEK Larnaca	Free transfer	
8 May 2009	FW	(Republic of Ireland) Billy Clarke	(England) Blackpool	Free transfer	
8 May 2009	DF	(England) Kurt Robinson	(England) Rushden & Diamonds	Free transfer	
8 May 2009	MF	(England) Jai Reason	(England) Cambridge United	Free transfer	
14 May 2009	MF	(England) Matt Richards	(England) Walsall	Free transfer	
21 May 2009	DF	(England) Dan Harding	(England) Southampton	Free transfer	
13 July 2009	FW	(England) Danny Haynes	(England) Bristol City	Undisclosed	
31 July 2009	FW	(England) Jordan Rhodes	(England) Huddersfield Town	£350,000	
4 August 2009	MF	(North Macedonia) Veliče Šumulikoski	(England) Preston North End	£400,000	
20 August 2009	GK	(Republic of Ireland) Shane Supple	Retired		
26 February 2010	DF	(Wales) Ben Thatcher	Free agent	Contract terminated	

- Total transfer income: £750,000+

=== Loans out ===
Date from	Pos	Name	From	Date until	Ref
3 August 2009	FW	(Jamaica) Kevin Lisbie	(England) Colchester United	30 June 2010	
6 November 2009	DF	(England) Jack Ainsley	(England) Rushden & Diamonds	1 January 2010	
20 November 2009	DF	(Netherlands) Pim Balkestein	(England) Brentford	31 December 2009	
4 January 2010	MF	(England) Liam Trotter	(England) Millwall	30 June 2010	
7 January 2010	DF	(New Zealand) Tommy Smith	(England) Brentford	30 June 2010	
12 January 2010	MF	(Republic of Ireland) Colin Healy	(Scotland) Falkirk	30 June 2010	
1 February 2010	DF	(Republic of Ireland) Alex Bruce	(England) Leicester City	30 June 2010	
1 February 2010	FW	(Hungary) Tamás Priskin	(England) Queens Park Rangers	30 June 2010	
15 February 2010	FW	(England) Jon Stead	(England) Coventry City	30 June 2010	
12 March 2010	MF	(England) Ed Upson	(England) Barnet	30 June 2010	
25 March 2010	DF	(Netherlands) Pim Balkestein	(England) Brentford	30 June 2010	

== Squad statistics ==
All statistics updated as of end of season

=== Appearances and goals ===
No.	Pos	Nat	Player	Total		Championship		FA Cup		League Cup	
No.	Pos	Nat	Player	Apps	Goals	Apps	Goals	Apps	Goals	Apps	Goals
Goalkeepers
1	GK	(England) ENG	Richard Wright	13	0	12	0	0	0	1	0
26	GK	(Republic of Ireland) IRL	Brian Murphy	16	0	16	0	0	0	0	0
28	GK	(England) ENG	Arran Lee-Barrett	15	0	12+1	0	2	0	0	0
Defenders
2	DF	(England) ENG	David Wright	29	1	25+1	1	1	0	2	0
3	DF	(Republic of Ireland) IRL	Damien Delaney	39	0	36	0	2	0	1	0
4	DF	(Northern Ireland) NIR	Gareth McAuley	43	5	40+1	5	2	0	0	0
12	DF	(Canada) CAN	Jaime Peters	34	1	22+10	1	0	0	2	0
22	DF	(England) ENG	Liam Rosenior	31	1	26+3	1	2	0	0	0
30	DF	(Republic of Ireland) IRL	Shane O'Connor	13	0	11+1	0	0	0	0+1	0
34	DF	(England) ENG	Jack Ainsley	1	0	0	0	0	0	1	0
35	DF	(New Zealand) NZL	Tommy Smith	15	0	11+3	0	0	0	1	0
39	DF	(Wales) WAL	Troy Brown	1	0	0+1	0	0	0	0	0
41	DF	(England) ENG	Tom Eastman	1	0	1	0	0	0	0	0
Midfielders
6	MF	(England) ENG	Grant Leadbitter	40	3	36+2	3	2	0	0	0
7	MF	(Republic of Ireland) IRL	Owen Garvan	28	1	14+11	0	1+1	1	1	0
8	MF	(England) ENG	Lee Martin	18	1	9+7	1	0+1	0	1	0
10	MF	(England) ENG	David Norris	25	2	24	2	1	0	0	0
17	MF	(England) ENG	Jack Colback	41	5	29+8	4	2	1	2	0
23	MF	(Trinidad and Tobago) TRI	Carlos Edwards	29	3	21+7	2	1	1	0	0
25	MF	(Republic of Ireland) IRL	Alan Quinn	21	1	8+11	0	0	0	2	1
37	MF	(Bermuda) BER	Reggie Lambe	1	0	0	0	0	0	0+1	0
42	MF	(England) ENG	Billy Clark	3	0	0+3	0	0	0	0	0
Forwards
9	FW	(Spain) ESP	Pablo Couñago	29	3	11+16	2	0+1	1	1	0
19	FW	(Republic of Ireland) IRL	Jonathan Walters	47	8	43	8	2	0	0+2	0
20	FW	(Northern Ireland) NIR	David Healy	12	1	5+7	1	0	0	0	0
21	FW	(Republic of Ireland) IRL	Daryl Murphy	18	6	18	6	0	0	0	0
40	FW	(England) ENG	Connor Wickham	29	7	9+17	4	0+1	1	1+1	2
Players transferred out during the season
5	DF	(Republic of Ireland) IRL	Alex Bruce	15	1	12+1	1	2	0	0	0
14	FW	(England) ENG	Jon Stead	22	6	13+9	6	0	0	0	0
15	DF	(Netherlands) NED	Pim Balkestein	10	0	8+1	0	0	0	1	0
16	FW	(Hungary) HUN	Tamás Priskin	19	2	9+8	1	0+1	0	1	1
18	MF	(Republic of Ireland) IRL	Colin Healy	5	0	3	0	0	0	2	0
21	FW	(Trinidad and Tobago) TRI	Stern John	9	1	5+2	1	2	0	0	0
27	GK	(Republic of Ireland) IRL	Shane Supple	1	0	0	0	0	0	1	0
27	GK	(Bosnia and Herzegovina) BIH	Asmir Begović	6	0	6	0	0	0	0	0
29	MF	(England) ENG	Ed Upson	2	0	0	0	0	0	0+2	0
36	MF	(England) ENG	Liam Trotter	12	0	11+1	0	0	0	0	0

Last updated: end of season
Source: Competitions

=== Goalscorers ===
No.	Pos	Nat	Player	Championship	FA Cup	League Cup	Total
19	FW	(Republic of Ireland)	Jonathan Walters	8	0	0	8
40	FW	(England)	Connor Wickham	4	1	2	7
14	FW	(England)	Jon Stead	6	0	0	6
21	FW	(Republic of Ireland)	Daryl Murphy	6	0	0	7
4	DF	(Northern Ireland)	Gareth McAuley	5	0	0	5
17	MF	(England)	Jack Colback	4	1	0	5
6	MF	(England)	Grant Leadbitter	3	0	0	3
9	FW	(Spain)	Pablo Couñago	2	1	0	3
23	MF	(Trinidad and Tobago)	Carlos Edwards	2	1	0	3
10	MF	(England)	David Norris	2	0	0	2
16	FW	(Hungary)	Tamás Priskin	1	0	1	2
2	DF	(England)	David Wright	1	0	0	1
5	DF	(Republic of Ireland)	Alex Bruce	1	0	0	1
7	MF	(Republic of Ireland)	Owen Garvan	0	1	0	1
8	MF	(England)	Lee Martin	1	0	0	1
12	DF	(Canada)	Jamie Peters	1	0	0	1
20	FW	(Northern Ireland)	David Healy	1	0	0	1
21	FW	(Trinidad and Tobago)	Stern John	1	0	0	1
22	DF	(England)	Liam Rosenior	1	0	0	1
25	MF	(Republic of Ireland)	Alan Quinn	0	0	1	1
Total				50	5	4	59

=== Clean sheets ===
Number	Nation	Name	Championship	FA Cup	League Cup	Total
1	(England)	Richard Wright	1	0	0	1
26	(Republic of Ireland)	Brian Murphy	6	0	0	6
27	(Bosnia and Herzegovina)	Asmir Begović	2	0	0	2
28	(England)	Arran Lee-Barrett	3	0	0	3
Total			12	0	0	12

=== Disciplinary record ===
No.	Pos.	Name	Championship		FA Cup		League Cup		Total	
No.	Pos.	Name	Booked	Sent off (straight red)	Booked	Sent off (straight red)	Booked	Sent off (straight red)	Booked	Sent off (straight red)
2	DF	(England) David Wright	3	0	0	0	0	0	3	0
3	DF	(Republic of Ireland) Damien Delaney	4	0	0	0	0	0	4	0
4	DF	(Northern Ireland) Gareth McAuley	4	1	0	0	0	0	4	1
5	DF	(Republic of Ireland) Alex Bruce	3	0	0	0	1	0	4	0
6	MF	(England) Grant Leadbitter	10	0	1	0	0	0	11	0
7	MF	(Republic of Ireland) Owen Garvan	2	0	0	0	0	0	2	0
8	MF	(England) Lee Martin	2	0	0	0	0	0	2	0
9	FW	(Spain) Pablo Couñago	2	0	1	0	0	0	3	0
10	MF	(England) David Norris	8	0	0	0	0	0	8	0
12	DF	(Canada) Jamie Peters	1	0	0	0	0	0	1	0
14	FW	(England) Jon Stead	0	1	0	0	0	0	0	1
15	DF	(Netherlands) Pim Balkestein	0	0	0	0	1	0	1	0
16	FW	(Hungary) Tamás Priskin	2	0	0	0	0	0	2	0
17	MF	(England) Jack Colback	6	0	0	0	0	0	6	0
19	FW	(Republic of Ireland) Jonathan Walters	8	0	0	0	0	0	8	0
21	FW	(Trinidad and Tobago) Stern John	1	0	0	0	0	0	1	0
22	DF	(England) Liam Rosenior	3	0	0	0	0	0	3	0
26	GK	(Republic of Ireland) Brian Murphy	1	0	0	0	0	0	1	0
28	GK	(England) Arran Lee-Barrett	1	0	1	0	0	0	2	0
35	DF	(New Zealand) Tommy Smith	1	0	0	0	0	0	1	0
40	FW	(England) Connor Wickham	3	0	1	0	0	0	4	0
41	DF	(England) Tom Eastman	0	1	0	0	0	0	0	1
Total			65	3	4	0	2	0	71	3

== Awards ==
=== Player awards ===
Award	Player	Ref
Player of the Year	(Northern Ireland) Gareth McAuley	
Players' Player of the Year	(England) Jack Colback	
Young Player of the Year	(England) Tom Eastman	
Goal of the Season	(England) Jack Colback	

=== Football League Young Player of the Month ===
Month	Player	Ref
April	(England) Connor Wickham	
