= 2011–12 Ipswich Town F.C. season =

Ipswich Town
2011–12 season
- Chairman: Marcus Evans
- Manager: Paul Jewell
- Stadium: Portman Road
- Championship: 15th
- FA Cup: Third round
- League Cup: First round
- Top goalscorer: League: Michael Chopra (14); All: Michael Chopra (14)
- Highest home attendance: 24,763 (vs Crystal Palace, 22 October 2011, Championship)
- Lowest home attendance: 9,401 (vs Northampton Town, 9 August 2011, League Cup)
- Average home league attendance: 18,267
Home colours	Away colours	Third colours

The 2011–12 season was Ipswich Town's tenth consecutive season in The Football League Championship, the second-highest division in the English football league system. In addition to competing in The Championship, Ipswich Town also competed in the League Cup and the FA Cup.

Ipswich were knocked out of the FA Cup in their first match, the third round, against Hull City and lost to Northampton Town in the first round of the League Cup. Winning their final league match, Ipswich avoided their worst league finish for 55 years, ending the season in 15th position, and becoming the longest continually serving member of The Championship courtesy of Coventry City's relegation to League One.

== Season summary ==
=== Pre-season ===
The 2011–12 season was Paul Jewell's first full season as manager of Ipswich Town. Many regular first-team players from the previous season left the club in the summer of 2011 including Márton Fülöp, Gareth McAuley and club captain David Norris. Young striker Connor Wickham was also sold to Sunderland on 29 June for a fee of over £8 million. New signings were made including strikers Michael Chopra and Jay Emmanuel-Thomas from Cardiff City and Arsenal respectively for fees of around £1 million each. Young left-back Aaron Cresswell was signed from Tranmere Rovers for a fee of around £250,000. Jewell also added experienced players to his squad, including former England internationals Lee Bowyer and Richard Wright, centre-backs Ívar Ingimarsson and Ibrahima Sonko, as well as striker Nathan Ellington who had previously played under Jewell at former clubs Wigan Athletic and Derby County. The previous seasons Player of the Season Jimmy Bullard was also signed permanently on a free transfer from Hull City following his loan spell the previous season. The loan signings of goalkeeper David Stockdale and Republic of Ireland internationals Keith Andrews and Daryl Murphy were also made to bolster the squad.

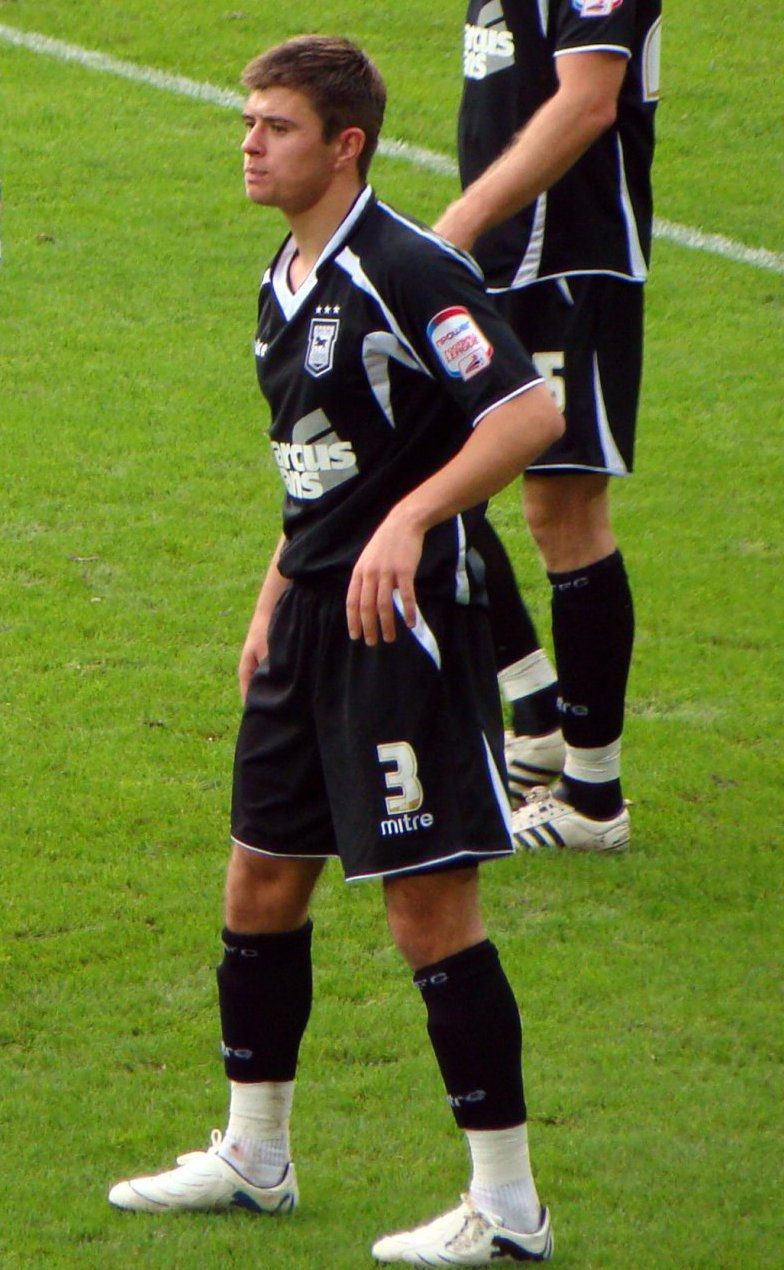
Aaron Cresswell won Ipswich's Player of the Season award during his debut season at the club after signing from Tranmere Rovers.

=== August to December ===
Ipswich made a winning start to the season, with new signing Michael Chopra scoring a brace in a 3–0 away win over Bristol City at Ashton Gate to take Ipswich to the top of the Championship table. Ipswich drew Football League Two side Northampton Town in the first round of the Football League Cup. Ipswich exited the League Cup at the first round following a 1–2 home loss, having initially lead the match through a goal from Jay Emmanuel-Thomas. The opening day league win was followed by a poor run of three straight losses in the league, including heavy defeats against Southampton and Peterborough United. Following this poor run, Ipswich managed to improve their form over the following eight games to get back into the play-off places. This improved run of form was followed by an appalling run of seven consecutive defeats to put Ipswich close to the relegation zone. This run looked set to continue as Ipswich found themselves 0–2 down at half-time away against Barnsley on 10 December, however an impressive second-half come-back saw Ipswich win the match 5–3 following second-half goals from Michael Chopra, Danny Collins, Jason Scotland and a brace from Keith Andrews. Ipswich followed this up with a 1–0 home win over Derby County at Portman Road,

=== January transfer window ===
Ipswich had a relatively quiet January transfer window, with goalkeeper Alex McCarthy joining on loan from Reading to provide competition following David Stockdale's loan return to Fulham in December. Scottish midfielder Ryan Stevenson was also signed from Heart of Midlothian for a fee of £50,000. There were no major departures from the club, although it was agreed that summer signing Ívar Ingimarsson's contract would be terminated by mutual consent, following which he decided to retire from football shortly after.

=== January to May ===
Another poor run followed leading up until late January, including a third round FA Cup exit to Hull City following a 3–1 away loss on 9 January. Ipswich managed to end this poor run with their biggest win of the season on 31 January, beating West Ham United 5–1 at Portman Road, with goals from Michael Chopra, Daryl Murphy, Lee Martin and a brace from Jay Emmanuel-Thomas. Ipswich went on to win the next three league matches to put a four game winning run together to take them away from the relegation zone. In February, Carlos Edwards took over as captain from current club captain Grant Leadbitter.

On 31 March 2012, the South Stand at Portman Road was renamed The Sir Alf Ramsey Stand in honour of former Ipswich and England manager Sir Alf Ramsey. The unveiling of the renamed stand took place before a home match against Barsnely. Prior to kick-off, club captain Carlos Edwards lead the Ipswich squad to applaud the members of the 1961–62 First Division title winning side including Ray Crawford, Andy Nelson, Larry Carberry, John Compton, Doug Moran and Ted Phillips, who had been invited to the club's directors box as part of the unveiling of The Sir Alf Ramsey Stand. Ipswich went on to win the match 1–0.

Ipswich followed-up their improved form in February with another consistent run throughout March, beginning the month with a 3–0 home win over Bristol City at Portman Road. Draws against Southampton and Hull City were followed by a 3–2 home win against Peterborough United, avenging the defeat to Peterborough earlier in the season. A run of 7 wins in 12 matches across February and March solidified Ipswich's place in mid-table following a poor first-half of the season.

Ipswich did not win any of their next five matches before ending the season with a 3–2 away win over Doncaster Rovers on the final day of the season, a match in which manager Paul Jewell gave academy graduate Byron Lawrence his first-team debut as a second-half substitute at the age of 16 years and 47 days old, making him the club's second youngest ever debutante after former striker Connor Wickham.

=== Post-season ===
An inconsistent season saw Ipswich finish 15th in the Championship, having not spent any time in the relegation zone during the season whilst never putting together a substantial challenge to get into the play-off places. The team suffered from a very poor defensive record, conceding 77 goals in the league, the joint second highest goals conceded of any team in the division, with only bottom placed side Doncaster Rovers conceding more goals than Ipswich, although only the division's top five placed sides scored more than Ipswich's 69 league goals, making them the highest scoring of any side to finish outside of the play-off positions. Striker Michael Chopra finished the season as Ipswich's top goal-scorer with 14 goals in his debut season at the club. Left-back Aaron Cresswell won the club's Player of the Season award for his excellent form during the campaign, with new skipper Carlos Edwards rounding off an impressive campaign by earning the Players' Player of the Season award. Striker Jason Scotland won the goal of the season award for his 25-yard equalizer away against Crystal Palace at Selhurst Park on 14 April.

== First-team squad ==
Note: Flags indicate national team as defined under FIFA eligibility rules; some limited exceptions apply. Players may hold more than one non-FIFA nationality.

No.	Pos.	Nation	Player
1	GK	ENG	Richard Wright
2	DF	CAN	Jaime Peters
3	DF	ENG	Aaron Cresswell
5	DF	IRL	Damien Delaney
6	MF	ENG	Grant Leadbitter
7	MF	TTO	Carlos Edwards (captain)
8	MF	ENG	Lee Bowyer
9	FW	ENG	Jay Emmanuel-Thomas
10	FW	ENG	Michael Chopra
11	MF	ENG	Lee Martin
12	GK	ENG	Arran Lee-Barrett
14	FW	TTO	Jason Scotland
16	MF	SCO	Ryan Stevenson

No.	Pos.	Nation	Player
17	MF	ENG	Andy Drury
18	FW	ENG	Nathan Ellington
19	MF	ENG	Luke Hyam
20	DF	NZL	Tommy Smith
21	MF	ENG	Jimmy Bullard
22	MF	NIR	Josh Carson
27	FW	IRL	Daryl Murphy (on loan from Celtic)
29	DF	ENG	Jack Ainsley
31	DF	SEN	Ibrahima Sonko
32	GK	ENG	Alex McCarthy (on loan from Reading)
38	MF	ENG	Byron Lawrence
39	DF	IRL	Mark Kennedy

=== Out on loan ===
Note: Flags indicate national team as defined under FIFA eligibility rules; some limited exceptions apply. Players may hold more than one non-FIFA nationality.

No.	Pos.	Nation	Player
4	DF	ISL	Ívar Ingimarsson (retired)
13	GK	ENG	David Stockdale (loan return to Fulham)
15	MF	IRL	Keith Andrews (loan return to Blackburn Rovers)
16	FW	HUN	Tamás Priskin (to Spartak Vladikavkaz)

No.	Pos.	Nation	Player
24	MF	IRL	Colin Healy (to Cork City)
25	DF	WAL	Danny Collins (loan return to Stoke City)
26	DF	ENG	Reece Wabara (loan return to Manchester City)
28	FW	IRL	Ronan Murray (on loan at Swindon Town)

== First-team coaching staff ==
Position	Name
Manager	(England) Paul Jewell
Assistant Manager	(England) Chris Hutchings
Assistant Manager	(Wales) Sean McCarthy
Goalkeeping Coach	(England) Malcolm Webster
Fitness Coach	(Scotland) Andy Liddell
Head of Fitness Development & Match Preparations	(England) Steve Williams
Head Physiotherapist	(England) Matt Byard
Assistant Head Physiotherapist	(England) Alex Chapman
Performance Analyst	(England) Jon Bickers
Kitman	(England) Paul Beesley

== Pre-season ==
12 July 2011	Eindhoven	0–2	Ipswich Town	Jan Louwers Stadion
14:30 BST			Chopra 48', 78'

13 July 2011	Haverhill Rovers	1–2	Ipswich Town XI	New Croft
19:45	Harvey		Lavery

14 July 2011	Den Bosch	1–3	Ipswich Town	de Vliert
18:00 BST	Van Dinter 74'		Smith 24'; Scotland 42'; Priskin 87'

19 July 2011	Cambridge United	2–2	Ipswich Town	Abbey Stadium
19:45	Charles 2'; Carew 4'		Chopra 5', 21'

20 July 2011	Bury Town	2–3	Ipswich Town XI	Ram Meadow
19:45	Bullard 23'; Cunningham 84'		Maduako 26'; Lavery 35'; Murray 86'

22 July 2011	Southend United	1–1	Ipswich Town	Roots Hall
19:45	Harris 66'		Martin 15'

26 July 2011	Colchester United	0–0	Ipswich Town	Colchester Community Stadium
20:00
Note: Match abandoned after 78 minutes

27 July 2011	Needham Market	1–1	Ipswich Town XI	Bloomfields
19:45	Fenn 26'		Priskin 53'

30 July 2011	Ipswich Town	1–2	Wolverhampton Wanderers	Ipswich
15:00	Bowyer 44'	Report	Hunt 76'; Ebanks-Blake 84' (pen.)	Stadium: Portman Road; Attendance: 5,945; Referee: Darren Deadman

== Competitions ==
=== Football League Championship ===
==== League table ====
Pos	Team	Pld	W	D	L	GF	GA	GD	Pts
13	Burnley	46	17	11	18	61	58	+3	62
14	Leeds United	46	17	10	19	65	68	−3	61
15	Ipswich Town	46	17	10	19	69	77	−8	61
16	Millwall	46	15	12	19	55	57	−2	57
17	Crystal Palace	46	13	17	16	46	51	−5	56

Updated to match(es) played on 28 April 2012. Source: BBC Sport
Rules for classification: 1) points; 2) goal difference; 3) number of goals scored.

==== Results summary ====
Overall								Home						Away					
Pld	W	D	L	GF	GA	GD	Pts	W	D	L	GF	GA	GD	W	D	L	GF	GA	GD
46	17	10	19	70	78	−8	61	11	4	9	40	33	+7	6	6	10	30	45	−15

Last updated: 28 April 2012.
Source: Table

==== Results by round ====
Round	1	2	3	4	5	6	7	8	9	10	11	12	13	14	15	16	17	18	19	20	21	22	23	24	25	26	27	28	29	30	31	32	33	34	35	36	37	38	39	40	41	42	43	44	45	46
Ground	A	H	H	A	H	A	H	A	A	H	A	H	H	A	H	A	H	A	H	A	H	A	A	H	A	H	A	H	A	A	H	A	H	A	A	H	H	A	H	H	A	H	A	H	H	A
Result	W	L	L	L	W	L	W	D	W	W	D	W	L	L	L	L	L	L	L	W	W	D	L	L	L	D	L	W	W	W	W	L	W	D	D	W	W	L	D	W	D	L	D	D	L	W
Position	1	7	16	20	14	17	13	13	11	9	10	6	9	11	14	16	18	20	21	20	19	19	19	19	20	19	21	19	19	17	16	16	14	15	16	15	14	15	15	14	15	15	15	15	15	15

Updated to match(es) played on 28 April 2012. Source: Fixtures Table
A = Away; H = Home; W = Win; D = Draw; L = Loss

==== August ====
6 August 2011 1	Bristol City	0–3	Ipswich Town	Ashton Gate
15:00		Report	Chopra 13', 60'; Martin 51'	Attendance: 13,107; Referee: Haywood

13 August 2011 2	Ipswich Town	0–1	Hull City	Portman Road
15:00		Report	Fryatt 76'; Cairney (yellow card) 85'	Attendance: 18,116; Referee: McDermid

16 August 2011 3	Ipswich Town	2–5	Southampton	Portman Road
19:45	Andrews 56'; Emmanuel-Thomas 61'	Report	Lambert 4', 11'; Connolly 42'; Lallana 76', 90+2'	Attendance: 18,553; Referee: Jon Moss

20 August 2011 4	Peterborough United	7–1	Ipswich Town	London Road Stadium
17:20	Taylor 30', 40'; Tomlin 38', 42', 90+3'; McCann 48' (pen.), 56'; Frecklington (yellow card) 52'	Report	Leadbitter (yellow card) 8'; Andrews 23'; Martin (red card) 45'; Smith (red card) 47'; Delaney (yellow card) 53'	Attendance: 7,928; Referee: Scott

27 August 2011 5	Ipswich Town	2–1	Leeds United	Portman Road
15:00	Emmanuel-Thomas (yellow card) 32'; Delaney (yellow card) 47'; Scotland 77'; Andrews 90'; Carson (yellow card) 90+3'	Report	McCormack 34'; White (red card) 49'; Clayton (yellow card) 68'; O'Brien (yellow card) 84'	Attendance: 19,758; Referee: D'Urso

==== September ====
10 September 2011 6	Blackpool	2–0	Ipswich Town	Bloomfield Road
15:00	Taylor-Fletcher 49'; Ferguson (yellow card) 56' (goal) 60'	Report	Collins (yellow card) 69'	Attendance: 12,804; Referee: Webster

19 September 2011 7	Ipswich Town	3–0	Coventry City	Portman Road
19:45	Cranie 7' (o.g.); Andrews 15'; Scotland 68'	Report	Bell (yellow card) 29'	Attendance: 15,650; Referee: Pawson

24 September 2011 8	Middlesbrough	0–0	Ipswich Town	Riverside Stadium
15:00	Bennet (yellow card) 3'	Report	Sonko (yellow card) 26'	Attendance: 17,741; Referee: Mathieson

27 September 2011 9	West Ham United	0–1	Ipswich Town	Upton Park
19:45	Lansbury (yellow card) 11'	Report	Bowyer (yellow card) 45' (goal) 89'	Attendance: 27,709; Referee: Stroud

==== October ====
1 October 2011 10	Ipswich Town	3–1	Brighton & Hove Albion	Portman Road
15:00	Leadbitter (yellow card) 40'; Bowyer (yellow card) 48'; Chopra 59', 73'; Sonko 70'	Report	Vicente 53'; Barnes (yellow card) 68'	Attendance: 19,793; Referee: Deadman

15 October 2011 11	Cardiff City	2–2	Ipswich Town	Cardiff City Stadium
15:00	Gestede 19'; Gunnarsson (yellow card) 45+2'; Whittingham 72' (pen.); McNaughton (yellow card) 87'	Report	Andrews (yellow card) 17'; Scotland 30'; Chopra 51'; Sonko (yellow card) 76'	Attendance: 21,809; Referee: Whitestone

18 October 2011 12	Ipswich Town	1–0	Portsmouth	Portman Road
19:45	Andrews 70'; Bowyer (yellow card) 82'	Report		Attendance: 17,297; Referee: Ward

22 October 2011 13	Ipswich Town	0–1	Crystal Palace	Portman Road
15:00	Cresswell (yellow card) 30' (yellow-red card) 92'; Bowyer (yellow card) 93'	Report	Dikgacoi (yellow card) 32'; McCarthy 55'	Attendance: 24,763; Referee: Phillips

29 October 2011 14	Millwall	4–1	Ipswich Town	The Den
15:00	Simpson 6', 75'; Henderson 9'; Feeney 73'	Report	Bullard 66'	Attendance: 12,464; Referee: Salisbury

==== November ====
1 November 2011	Birmingham City	P–P	Ipswich Town	St Andrew's
19:45
Note: Game postponed due to Birmingham's Europa League commitments, rescheduled for 11 January 2012, 19:45 kick-off

5 November 2011 15	Ipswich Town	2–3	Doncaster Rovers	Portman Road
15:00	Carson 53'; Leadbitter (yellow card) 63'; Emmanuel-Thomas (yellow card) 73'; Andrews (yellow card) 84'; Chopra 90+4'	Report	Diouf 18', 39'; Sharp 24'; Gillett (yellow card) 36'; Stock (yellow card) 60'	Attendance: 17,184; Referee: Hooper

19 November 2011 16	Nottingham Forest	3–2	Ipswich Town	City Ground
15:00	Findley 42'; Lynch 84'; Tudgay 90+1'	Report	Collins 25', 63'	Attendance: 21,143; Referee: Linington

26 November 2011 17	Ipswich Town	2–3	Reading	Portman Road
15:00	Murphy 56'; Carson 79'	Report	Gorkšs 76'; Pearce 90+1'; Hunt 93+1'	Attendance: 17,154; Referee: Ilderton

29 November 2011 18	Burnley	4–0	Ipswich Town	Turf Moor
19:45	Vokes 33'; McCann 45+1', 66'; Treacy (yellow card) 64'; Rodriguez 77'	Report		Attendance: 12,499; Referee: Miller

==== December ====
3 December 2011 19	Ipswich Town	1–2	Watford	Portman Road
15:00	Andrews 44' (yellow card) 83'	Report	Nosworthy (yellow card) 51'; Dickinson (yellow card) 62'; Sordell 69' (pen.) (yellow card) 81'; Deeney 74'	Attendance: 16,262; Referee: Stroud

10 December 2011 20	Barnsley	3–5	Ipswich Town	Oakwell
17:20	Davies 14' (pen.), 89'; Vaz Tê 39'	Report	Stockdale (yellow card) 12'; Sonko (yellow card) 24'; Martin (yellow card) 28'; Andrews 46', 49' (yellow card) 54'; Chopra (yellow card) 58' (goal) 68'; Collins 66'; Scotland 83'	Attendance: 9,107; Referee: Sutton

17 December 2011 21	Ipswich Town	1–0	Derby County	Portman Road
15:00	Andrews 46'	Report	Bailey (yellow card) 55'; Ward (yellow card) 90+6'	Attendance: 17,256; Referee: Webb

26 December 2011 22	Leicester City	1–1	Ipswich Town	King Power Stadium
15:00	Gallagher 69' (pen.)	Report	Bowyer 4'; Sonko (yellow card) 8'; Martin (yellow card) 38'	Attendance: 27,091; Referee: Drysdale

31 December 2011 23	Reading	1–0	Ipswich Town	Madejski Stadium
15:00	Pearce 64'	Report	Sonko (yellow card) 50'	Attendance: 18,737; Referee: Waugh

==== January ====
2 January 2012 24	Ipswich Town	1–3	Nottingham Forest	Portman Road
15:00	Leadbitter 75' (pen.) (yellow card) 90+2'	Report	Tudgay 5', 78'; McCleary 26'	Attendance: 18,964; Referee: Boyeson

11 January 2012 25	Birmingham City	2–1	Ipswich Town	St Andrew's
19:45	Žigić 9', 90+1'	Report	Martin 18'; Leadbitter (yellow card) 84'	Attendance: 16,528; Referee: Lewis

14 January 2012 26	Ipswich Town	2–2	Blackpool	Portman Road
15:00	Cresswell (yellow card) 7'; Ángel 10' (o.g.); Hyam (yellow card) 24'; Smith 60'	Report	Grandin 65'; Phillips 80'; Basham (yellow card) 84'	Attendance: 16,497; Referee: Ward

21 January 2012 27	Leeds United	3–1	Ipswich	Elland Road
15:00	Becchio (yellow card) 58' (goal) 90+1'; Snodgrass 74'; McCormack 82'	Report	Drury 34'; McCarthy (red card) 71'; Hyam (yellow card) 76'	Attendance: 22,844; Referee: Eltrigham

31 January 2012 28	Ipswich Town	5–1	West Ham United	Portman Road
19:45	Chopra 3'; Murphy 44'; Martin (yellow card) 90+2' (goal) 45+3' (pen.); Emmanuel-Thomas 64', 90+4'	Report	Collison 45'; Nolan (yellow card) 45+1'; McCartney (yellow card) 45+1'	Attendance: 22,185; Referee: Graham

==== February ====
4 February 2012 29	Coventry City	2–3	Ipswich Town	Ricoh Arena
15:00	Clingan 29' (pen.); Deegan 45'; Wood (yellow card) 66'	Report	Emmanuel-Thomas 22'; Chopra 64', 90+3'	Attendance: 13,464; Referee: Miller

11 February 2012	Ipswich Town	A–A	Middlesbrough	Portman Road
15:00		Report		Referee: Whitestone
Note: Abandoned after 37 minutes due to frozen pitch

14 February 2012 30	Portsmouth	0–1	Ipswich Town	Fratton Park
19:45	Ben Haim (yellow card) 12'; Halford (yellow card) 50'; Rocha (yellow card) 83'	Report	Chopra 13'; Hyam (yellow card) 30'; Emmanuel-Thomas (yellow card) 33'; Delaney (yellow card) 54'; Scotland (yellow card) 82'	Attendance: 14,330; Referee: Deadman

18 February 2012 31	Ipswich Town	3–0	Cardiff City	Portman Road
15:00	Lee-Barrett (yellow card) 9'; Martin 21', 73'; Chopra 47'	Report		Attendance: 17,032; Referee: Hooper

25 February 2012 32	Brighton & Hove Albion	3–0	Ipswich Town	Falmer Stadium
15:00	Mackail-Smith 20'; Barnes 65', 88'; Jara (yellow card) 78'	Report	Hyam (yellow card) 35'; Chopra (yellow card) 69'; Delaney (yellow card) 75'	Attendance: 20,490; Referee: Webster

==== March ====
3 March 2012 33	Ipswich Town	3–0	Bristol City	Portman Road
15:00	Chopra 25'; Leadbitter (yellow card) 30'; Edwards (yellow card) 43'; Smith 66'; Drury 85'; Delaney (yellow card) 88'	Report	Davis (yellow card) 44'; Fontaine (yellow card) 60'; Bolaise (yellow card) 62'; Carey (yellow card) 90'	Attendance: 16,671; Referee: Woolmer

6 March 2012 34	Southampton	1–1	Ipswich Town	St Mary's Stadium
19:45	Lambert 74'; Harding (yellow card) 87'	Report	Murphy (yellow card) 68'; Scotland 85'	Attendance: 23,315; Referee: Drysdale

10 March 2012 35	Hull City	2–2	Ipswich Town	KC Stadium
15:00	Brady 17'; McKenna (yellow card) 52'; Koren 54'; Dawson (yellow card) 75'	Report	Delaney (yellow card) 30'; Leadbitter 65' (pen.), 70'	Attendance: 17,625; Referee: East

17 March 2012 36	Ipswich Town	3–2	Peterborough United	Portman Road
15:00	Leadbitter 15'; Murphy 76'; Cresswell 85'	Report	Barnett 34'; Frecklington (yellow card) 64'; Sinclair 83'	Attendance: 17,927; Referee: Sutton

21 March 2012 37	Ipswich Town	1–0	Burnley	Portman Road
19:45	Bowyer (yellow card) 30'; Chopra 54'; Leadbitter (yellow card) 89' (yellow-red card)	Report		Attendance: 16,564; Referee: Linington

24 March 2012 38	Watford	2–1	Ipswich Town	Vicarage Road
15:00	Murray 71'; Deeney 82'	Report	Emmanuel-Thomas 18'	Attendance: 12,757; Referee: Walton

27 March 2012 39	Ipswich Town	1–1	Middlesbrough	Portman Road
19:45	Smith (yellow card) 44'; Leadbitter 74'	Report	Bailey (yellow card) 58'; Jutkiewicz 63'	Attendance: 18,727; Referee: Stroud

31 March 2012 40	Ipswich Town	1–0	Barnsley	Portman Road
15:00	Murphy 48'; Martin (yellow card) 62'; Delaney (yellow card) 68'	Report		Attendance: 20,053; Referee: Gibbs

==== April ====
7 April 2012 41	Derby County	0–0	Ipswich Town	Pride Park Stadium
15:00	Shackell (yellow card) 87'	Report		Attendance: 24,156; Referee: Haywood

9 April 2012 42	Ipswich Town	1–2	Leicester City	Portman Road
15:00	Scotland 43'	Report	Marshall 45'; King (yellow card) 55'; Nugent 58'	Attendance: 18,282; Referee: Bates

14 April 2012 43	Crystal Palace	1–1	Ipswich Town	Selhurst Park
15:00	Martin 36'; O'Keefe (yellow card) 38'; Clyne (yellow card) 68'	Report	Smith (yellow card) 24'; Martin (yellow card) 59'; Scotland 59'; Delaney (yellow card) 82'	Attendance: 17,961; Referee: Graham

17 April 2012 44	Ipswich Town	1–1	Birmingham City	Portman Road
19:45	Emmanuel-Thomas 75'	Report	Burke 45'; Gomis (yellow card) 40'	Attendance: 16,503; Referee: Sheldrake

21 April 2012 45	Ipswich Town	0–3	Millwall	Portman Road
15:00		Report	Keogh 3' 87'; Trotter 63'	Attendance: 18,947; Referee: Colin Webster

28 April 2012 46	Doncaster Rovers	2–3	Ipswich Town	Keepmoat Stadium
12:30	Robert 34'; Beye 90+2'	Report	Smith 10'; Stevenson 29'; Martin (yellow card) 42'; Scotland 79' (pen.)	Attendance: 9,764; Referee: Scott Mathieson

=== FA Cup ===
7 January 2012 Third round	Hull City	3–1	Ipswich Town	KC Stadium
15:00	McLean 27'; Cairney 32'; McShane (yellow card) 54'; Stewart 90+3'	Report	Smith (yellow card) 50'; Scotland 57'	Attendance: 10,246; Referee: Pawson

=== Football League Cup ===
9 August 2011 First round	Ipswich Town	1–2	Northampton Town	Portman Road
19:45	Emmanuel-Thomas 11'	Report	Tozer 39'; Turnbull 54'	Attendance: 9,401; Referee: Naylor

== Transfers ==
=== Transfers in ===
Date	Position	Nationality	Name	From	Fee	Ref.
10 June 2011	CF	(England)	Michael Chopra	(Wales) Cardiff City	£1,000,000 (Note: The fee was officially believed to be £1.5 million, Ipswich Town manager Paul Jewell revealed the fee to be £1 million.)	
13 June 2011	CB	(Iceland)	Ívar Ingimarsson	(England) Reading	Free transfer	
21 June 2011	CF	(England)	Nathan Ellington	(England) Watford	Free transfer	
1 July 2011	LB	(England)	Aaron Cresswell	(England) Tranmere Rovers	£240,000 (Note: May rise to £520,000 based on appearances and promotion.)	
10 July 2011	CM	(England)	Lee Bowyer	(England) Birmingham City	Free transfer	
26 July 2011	CF	(England)	Jay Emmanuel-Thomas	(England) Arsenal	£1,100,000	
23 August 2011	GK	(England)	Richard Wright	Free agent	Free transfer	
25 August 2011	CM	(England)	Jimmy Bullard	(England) Hull City	Free transfer	
26 August 2011	CB	(Senegal)	Ibrahima Sonko	(England) Stoke City	Free transfer	
30 January 2012	AM	(Scotland)	Ryan Stevenson	(Scotland) Heart of Midlothian	£50,000	

=== Loans in ===
Date from	Position	Nationality	Name	From	Date until	Ref.
26 July 2011	GK	(England)	David Stockdale	(England) Fulham	14 December 2011	
12 August 2011	DM	(Republic of Ireland)	Keith Andrews	(England) Blackburn Rovers	30 January 2012	
25 August 2011	CF	(Republic of Ireland)	Daryl Murphy	(Scotland) Celtic	30 June 2011	
9 September 2011	CB	(Wales)	Danny Collins	(England) Stoke City	17 December 2011	
30 September 2011	CB	(England)	Reece Wabara	(England) Manchester City	31 December 2011	
9 January 2012	GK	(England)	Alex McCarthy	(England) Reading	11 April 2012	

=== Transfers out ===
Date	Position	Nationality	Name	To	Fee	Ref.
23 May 2011	CB	(Northern Ireland)	Gareth McAuley	(England) West Bromwich Albion	Free transfer	
15 June 2011	CM	(England)	David Norris	(England) Portsmouth	Free transfer	
29 June 2011	CF	(England)	Connor Wickham	(England) Sunderland	£8,100,000 (Note: Fee could potentially rise to £12,000,000 with add-ons)	
29 June 2011	LM	(Argentina)	Luciano Civelli	(Paraguay) Club Libertad	Free transfer	
1 July 2011	CF	(Spain)	Pablo Couñago	Free agent	Released	
1 July 2011	CF	(Jamaica)	Kevin Lisbie	(England) Leyton Orient	Free transfer	
1 July 2011	CM	(Republic of Ireland)	David Cawley	Free agent	Released	
1 July 2011	CB	(England)	Josh Meekings	(Scotland) Inverness Caledonian Thistle	Free transfer	
1 July 2011	LB	(England)	Rory McKeown	(Scotland) Kilmarnock	Free transfer	
1 July 2011	GK	(Republic of Ireland)	Ian McLoughlin	(England) Milton Keynes Dons	Free transfer	
1 July 2011	GK	(Republic of Ireland)	Brian Murphy	(England) Queens Park Rangers	Free transfer	
1 July 2011	CM	(Republic of Ireland)	Alan Quinn	Free agent	Released	
1 July 2011	CB	(Wales)	Troy Brown	(England) Rotherham United	Free transfer	
1 July 2011	CB	(England)	Tom Eastman	(England) Colchester United	Free transfer	
1 July 2011	RM	(Bermuda)	Reggie Lambe	Free agent	Released	
30 July 2011	CM	(Republic of Ireland)	Conor Hourihane	(England) Plymouth Argyle	Free transfer	
6 August 2011	GK	(Hungary)	Márton Fülöp	(England) West Bromwich Albion	Free transfer	
23 November 2011	CM	(Republic of Ireland)	Colin Healy	(Republic of Ireland) Cork City	Free transfer	
9 January 2012	CB	(Iceland)	Ívar Ingimarsson	Retired		
17 January 2012	CF	(Hungary)	Tamás Priskin	(Russia) Alania Vladikavkaz	Free transfer	
20 January 2012	LB	(Republic of Ireland)	Shane O'Connor	(Republic of Ireland) Cork City	Free transfer	
8 March 2012	LM	(England)	Jamie Griffiths	(England) Sudbury	Free transfer	

=== Loans out ===
Date from	Position	Nationality	Name	To	Date until	Ref.
31 August 2011	CM	(England)	Jamie Griffiths	(England) Plymouth Argyle	30 November 2011	
15 September 2011	LW	(England)	Andy Drury	(England) Crawley Town	19 January 2012	
23 September 2011	RB	(Canada)	Jaime Peters	(England) Bournemouth	8 December 2011	
24 November 2011	LB	(Republic of Ireland)	Shane O'Connor	(England) Port Vale	20 January 2012	
24 November 2011	CF	(Hungary)	Tamás Priskin	(England) Derby County	17 January 2012	
25 November 2011	CF	(Republic of Ireland)	Ronan Murray	(England) Swindon Town	14 January 2012	
19 January 2012	CF	(Republic of Ireland)	Ronan Murray	(England) Swindon Town	30 June 2012	

=== New contracts ===
Number	Position	Nationality	Name	Contract length	Expiry	Ref.
3	LB	(England)	Aaron Cresswell	1 year	2015	
29	RB	(England)	Jack Ainsley	1.5 years	2013	
22	LW	(Northern Ireland)	Josh Carson	3 years	2015	
28	CF	(Republic of Ireland)	Ronan Murray	1.5 years	2013	
19	CM	(England)	Luke Hyam	1 year	2013	

== Squad statistics ==
All statistics updated as of end of season

=== Appearances and goals ===
No.	Pos	Nat	Player	Total		Championship		FA Cup		League Cup	
No.	Pos	Nat	Player	Apps	Goals	Apps	Goals	Apps	Goals	Apps	Goals
Goalkeepers
1	GK	(England) ENG	Richard Wright	1	0	1	0	0	0	0	0
12	GK	(England) ENG	Arran Lee-Barrett	20	0	17+1	0	1	0	1	0
32	GK	(England) ENG	Alex McCarthy	10	0	10	0	0	0	0	0
Defenders
2	DF	(Canada) CAN	Jaime Peters	1	0	0	0	0	0	1	0
3	DF	(England) ENG	Aaron Cresswell	46	1	44	1	1	0	1	0
5	DF	(Republic of Ireland) IRL	Damien Delaney	30	0	26+3	0	1	0	0	0
20	DF	(New Zealand) NZL	Tommy Smith	28	3	24+2	3	0+1	0	1	0
29	DF	(England) ENG	Jack Ainsley	2	0	1	0	0	0	1	0
39	DF	(Republic of Ireland) IRL	Mark Kennedy	7	0	6+1	0	0	0	0	0
31	DF	(Senegal) SEN	Ibrahima Sonko	23	1	20+2	1	1	0	0	0
Midfielders
6	MF	(England) ENG	Grant Leadbitter	36	5	32+2	5	1	0	0+1	0
7	MF	(Trinidad and Tobago) TTO	Carlos Edwards	46	0	45	0	1	0	0	0
8	MF	(England) ENG	Lee Bowyer	29	2	24+5	2	0	0	0	0
11	MF	(England) ENG	Lee Martin	35	5	28+6	5	0	0	0+1	0
17	MF	(England) ENG	Andy Drury	22	2	20+1	2	0	0	1	0
16	MF	(Scotland) SCO	Ryan Stevenson	11	1	3+8	1	0	0	0	0
19	MF	(England) ENG	Luke Hyam	10	0	7+1	0	1	0	1	0
21	MF	(England) ENG	Jimmy Bullard	21	1	12+9	1	0	0	0	0
22	MF	(Northern Ireland) NIR	Josh Carson	17	2	5+11	2	1	0	0	0
38	MF	(England) ENG	Byron Lawrence	1	0	0+1	0	0	0	0	0
Forwards
9	FW	(England) ENG	Jay Emmanuel-Thomas	44	7	28+14	6	1	0	1	1
10	FW	(England) ENG	Michael Chopra	46	14	39+6	14	0+1	0	0	0
14	FW	(Trinidad and Tobago) TTO	Jason Scotland	38	9	20+16	8	0+1	1	1	0
18	FW	(England) ENG	Nathan Ellington	17	0	1+14	0	1	0	1	0
27	FW	(Republic of Ireland) IRL	Daryl Murphy	34	4	31+2	4	1	0	0	0
Players transferred out during the season
4	DF	(Iceland) ISL	Ívar Ingimarsson	8	0	6+2	0	0	0	0	0
13	GK	(England) ENG	David Stockdale	18	0	18	0	0	0	0	0
15	MF	(Republic of Ireland) IRL	Keith Andrews	20	9	19+1	9	0	0	0	0
16	FW	(Hungary) HUN	Tamás Priskin	2	0	1+1	0	0	0	0	0
24	MF	(Republic of Ireland) IRL	Colin Healy	2	0	1	0	0	0	1	0
25	DF	(Wales) WAL	Danny Collins	16	3	16	3	0	0	0	0
26	DF	(England) ENG	Reece Wabara	6	0	1+5	0	0	0	0	0

Last updated: end of season
Source: Competitions

=== Goalscorers ===
No.	Pos.	Nat.	Name	Championship	FA Cup	League Cup	Total
10	FW	(England)	Michael Chopra	14	0	0	14
15	MF	(Republic of Ireland)	Keith Andrews	9	0	0	9
14	FW	(Trinidad and Tobago)	Jason Scotland	7	1	0	8
9	FW	(England)	Jay Emmanuel-Thomas	6	0	1	7
6	MF	(England)	Grant Leadbitter	5	0	0	5
11	MF	(England)	Lee Martin	5	0	0	5
27	FW	(Republic of Ireland)	Daryl Murphy	4	0	0	4
25	DF	(Wales)	Danny Collins	3	0	0	3
8	MF	(England)	Lee Bowyer	2	0	0	2
17	MF	(England)	Andy Drury	2	0	0	2
20	DF	(New Zealand)	Tommy Smith	2	0	0	2
22	MF	(Northern Ireland)	Josh Carson	2	0	0	2
3	DF	(England)	Aaron Cresswell	1	0	0	1
21	MF	(England)	Jimmy Bullard	1	0	0	1
31	DF	(Senegal)	Ibrahima Sonko	1	0	0	1
Own goal				2	0	0	2
Total				64	1	1	66

=== Clean sheets ===
No.	Nat	Player	Championship	FA Cup	League Cup	Total
12	(England)	Arran Lee-Barrett	5	0	0	5
13	(England)	David Stockdale	5	0	0	5
32	(England)	Alex McCarthy	2	0	0	2
Total			12	0	0	12

=== Disciplinary record ===
No.	Pos.	Nat.	Name	Championship		FA Cup		League Cup		Total	
No.	Pos.	Nat.	Name	Yellow card	Red card	Yellow card	Red card	Yellow card	Red card	Yellow card	Red card
11	MF	(England)	Lee Martin	4	1	0	0	0	0	4	1
6	MF	(England)	Grant Leadbitter	6	1	0	0	0	0	6	1
20	DF	(New Zealand)	Tommy Smith	1	2	1	0	0	0	2	2
3	DF	(England)	Aaron Cresswell	2	1	0	0	0	0	2	1
32	GK	(England)	Alex McCarthy	0	1	0	0	0	0	0	1
5	DF	(Republic of Ireland)	Damien Delaney	9	0	0	0	0	0	9	0
8	MF	(England)	Lee Bowyer	5	0	0	0	0	0	5	0
31	DF	(Senegal)	Ibrahima Sonko	5	0	0	0	0	0	5	0
19	MF	(England)	Luke Hyam	5	0	0	0	0	0	5	0
~~15~~	MF	(Republic of Ireland)	Keith Andrews	4	0	0	0	0	0	4	0
9	FW	(England)	Jay Emmanuel-Thomas	3	0	0	0	0	0	3	0
10	FW	(England)	Michael Chopra	3	0	0	0	0	0	3	0
22	MF	(Northern Ireland)	Josh Carson	1	0	0	0	0	0	1	0
~~25~~	DF	(Wales)	Danny Collins	1	0	0	0	0	0	1	0
~~13~~	GK	(England)	David Stockdale	1	0	0	0	0	0	1	0
1	GK	(England)	Arran Lee-Barrett	1	0	0	0	0	0	1	0
7	MF	(Trinidad and Tobago)	Carlos Edwards	1	0	0	0	0	0	1	0
27	FW	(Republic of Ireland)	Daryl Murphy	1	0	0	0	0	0	1	0
Total				53	6	1	0	0	0	54	6

== Awards ==
=== Player awards ===
Award	Player	Ref
Player of the Year	(England) Aaron Cresswell	
Players' Player of the Year	(Trinidad and Tobago) Carlos Edwards	
Young Player of the Year	(Iceland) Gunnar Thorsteinsson	
Goal of the Season	(Trinidad and Tobago) Jason Scotland	
