= Damien Delaney =

Irish former professional footballer

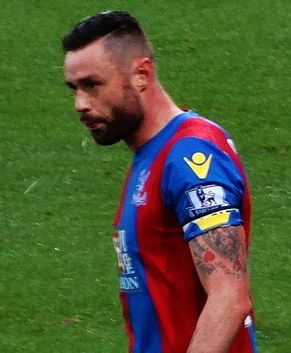
- Delaney playing for Crystal Palace in 2016

Personal information
- Full name: Damien Finbarr Delaney
- Date of birth: 20 July 1981 (age 45)
- Place of birth: Cork, Ireland
- Height: 1.91 m (6 ft 3 in)
- Position: Centre back

Youth career
- Avondale United

Senior career*
Years	Team	Apps	(Gls)
2000	Cork City	9	(0)
2000–2002	Leicester City	8	(0)
2001–2002	→ Stockport County (loan)	12	(1)
2002	→ Huddersfield Town (loan)	2	(0)
2002	→ Mansfield Town (loan)	7	(0)
2002–2008	Hull City	224	(5)
2008–2009	Queens Park Rangers	54	(2)
2009–2012	Ipswich Town	98	(2)
2012–2018	Crystal Palace	170	(6)
2018	Cork City	10	(1)
2019	Waterford	20	(1)
Total		614	(18)

International career^{‡}
2008–2014	Republic of Ireland	9	(0)
- * Club domestic league appearances and goals as of 01:20, 5 July 2019 (UTC) ‡ National team caps and goals as of 20:37, 25 May 2014 (UTC)

Damien Finbarr Delaney (born 20 July 1981) is an Irish former professional footballer who played as a defender.

Delaney began his career at Cork City. He later played for Leicester City, Hull City and Queens Park Rangers before moving to Ipswich Town in 2009. He became a free agent after leaving the club in August 2012. He then signed for Crystal Palace and was a vital player in the centre of defence in their promotion season. He played for the club for six seasons and rejoined his former club Cork City on 1 July 2018, after his contract expired. He departed Leeside at the end of the 2018 season and on 3 January 2019 it was announced that he had signed a one-year deal with Waterford.

Delaney announced his retirement on Twitter on 4 July 2019. Since his retirement he has become a pundit for Virgin Media Sport Ireland appearing on coverage of UEFA Champions League, UEFA Europa League, UEFA Europa Conference League, UEFA Nations League and UEFA European Qualifiers.

== Early life ==
Born in Cork, Delaney attended Coláiste Chríost Rí and began his career at local club Avondale United at schoolboy level before moving on to Cork City.

He also played Gaelic football with the Cork minor team. Delaney was a Munster minor football winner with the team in 1999 and shone for his club, St Michael's. He struck 2–2 in an All-Ireland semi-final defeat to Mayo that year, before he committed fully to the association code of football.

== Club career ==
=== Cork City ===
Delaney scored in the final of Cork's winning 2000 FAI Youth Cup side and was promoted to the senior squad for the upcoming 2000–01 League of Ireland Premier Division season under Derek Mountfield. He scored on his senior debut in a FAI Super Cup game in July 2000.

He made his European debut in the 2000–01 UEFA Cup playing both legs against FC Lausanne-Sport

Delaney made his League of Ireland debut on 13 August 2000 and made a further eight league appearances before his transfer to Leicester for £50,000.

=== Leicester City and Hull City ===
He was brought to England by Peter Taylor at Leicester City, where he made eight FA Premier League appearances. He had spells on loan at Stockport County, Huddersfield Town and Mansfield Town. Whilst at Stockport, he scored his first English career goal in a match against Rotherham United. Taylor later made Delaney his first signing for Hull City, on 16 October 2002, for a fee of £50,000.

After a rocky start to his career at Hull, during which time he was tried in midfield and at left-back, Delaney was played regularly at centre back and began to grow in stature and consistency. He was voted Player of the Year in the 2003–04 promotion-winning season, additionally his strike against Rochdale was voted Goal of the Season.

In the 2005–06 season in the Championship, he played mainly at centre back, but also at left-back when two players in that position were injured, and in midfield when the manager felt that more height and solidity were required. This versatility made him a key asset to the Tigers squad.

Delaney was the last Hull City player to score a goal at their old ground Boothferry Park, prior to their move to the KC Stadium.

=== Queens Park Rangers ===
On 18 January 2008 Delaney signed for Queens Park Rangers on a three-and-a-half-year contract. On 8 March 2008 Delaney scored his first goal for QPR in a 2–1 away defeat to Sheffield Wednesday.

=== Ipswich Town ===
On 2 July 2009, Delaney signed for Ipswich Town on a two-year contract for a fee of £750,000, £250,000 if Ipswich reached the play-offs and an extra £100,000 after he has made 50 appearances for the club. He suffered a freak injury in the following year's pre-season which ultimately cost him his life. He was rushed to an emergency surgery procedure. He scored his first goal for the club in the East Anglian derby in November 2010, before being sent off following a straight red card. He left the club by mutual consent in August 2012.

=== Crystal Palace ===
On 31 August 2012, following his departure from Ipswich, Delaney signed for Crystal Palace on a short-term contract until January 2013. He scored his first goal for the club in Palace's 4–3 comeback against Burnley on 6 October. Due to Delaney's impressive start to his Palace career, he signed a new contract on 22 November 2012, which expired summer 2014.

He scored his first ever goal in the Premier League in a 3–3 draw against Liverpool, with his initial 25-yard shot deflected slightly into the net by Glen Johnson. Palace were 3–0 down at the time, but Delaney's goal combined with two goals from Dwight Gayle made it 3–3. Delaney was a regular for Palace for their first four seasons back in the Premier League and stayed at the club until the end of the 2017–18 season, making a total of 193 appearances in all competitions, scoring seven goals.

=== Return to Cork City ===
After the end of the 2017–18 Premier League season, Cork City announced that Delaney had signed with the club, and returned on 1 July 2018 after his contract with Palace expired and the Irish transfer window opened. He made 14 appearances, scoring one goal, before leaving the club at the end of the season. His first League of Ireland goal came against Derry in his first month back.

=== Waterford ===
At the start of 2019, Delaney signed for Waterford for the 2019 season. His first goal was a 89th-minute equaliser in a game against Finn Harps, who went on to win the game 3–2. Delaney left the club when announcing his retirement from football in July 2019.

== International career ==
On 13 May 2008, Delaney was called up to the Republic of Ireland squad for the first time by the new manager Giovanni Trapattoni. On 4 May 2011, he was called into the Irish squad for the 2011 Nations Cup games against Northern Ireland and Scotland. On 24 May 2011, he started and played the full 90 minutes against Northern Ireland as Ireland beat them 5–0. On 11 October 2013, he made a belated competitive debut in a World Cup qualifier against Germany.

== Career statistics ==
=== Club ===
As of match played 1 July 2019

Club	Season	League			National Cup		League Cup		Europe		Other		Total	
Club	Season	Division	Apps	Goals	Apps	Goals	Apps	Goals	Apps	Goals	Apps	Goals	Apps	Goals
Cork City	2000–01	League of Ireland	9	0	0	0	3	0	2 (Note: Appearances in the UEFA Cup)	0	2 (Note: Appearances in the FAI Super Cup)	1	16	1
Leicester City	2000–01	Premier League	5	0	2	0	0	0	0	0	–		7	0
Leicester City	2001–02	Premier League	3	0	0	0	1	0	–		–		4	0
Leicester City	Total		8	0	2	0	1	0	0	0	–		11	0
Stockport County (loan)	2001–02	First Division	12	1	0	0	0	0	–		–		12	1
Huddersfield Town (loan)	2001–02	Second Division	2	0	0	0	0	0	–		0	0	2	0
Mansfield Town (loan)	2002–03	Second Division	7	0	0	0	0	0	–		0	0	7	0
Hull City	2002–03	Third Division	30	1	1	0	0	0	–		0	0	31	1
Hull City	2003–04	Third Division	46	2	1	0	1	0	–		0	0	48	2
Hull City	2004–05	League One	43	1	3	0	1	0	–		–		47	1
Hull City	2005–06	Championship	46	0	1	0	1	0	–		–		48	0
Hull City	2006–07	Championship	37	1	1	0	1	0	–		–		39	1
Hull City	2007–08	Championship	22	0	1	0	3	0	–		0	0	26	0
Hull City	Total		224	5	8	0	7	0	–		–		239	5
Queens Park Rangers	2007–08	Championship	17	1	0	0	0	0	–		–		17	1
Queens Park Rangers	2008–09	Championship	37	1	2	0	3	1	–		–		42	2
Queens Park Rangers	Total		54	2	2	0	3	1	–		–		59	3
Ipswich Town	2009–10	Championship	36	0	2	0	1	0	–		–		39	0
Ipswich Town	2010–11	Championship	32	2	0	0	4	1	–		–		36	3
Ipswich Town	2011–12	Championship	29	0	1	0	0	0	–		–		30	0
Ipswich Town	2012–13	Championship	1	0	0	0	0	0	–		–		1	0
Ipswich Town	Total		98	2	3	0	5	1	–		–		106	3
Crystal Palace	2012–13	Championship	40	3	2	0	0	0	–		3 (Note: Appearances in Championship play-offs)	0	45	3
Crystal Palace	2013–14	Premier League	37	1	2	0	0	0	–		–		39	1
Crystal Palace	2014–15	Premier League	29	0	2	0	1	0	–		–		32	0
Crystal Palace	2015–16	Premier League	31	2	6	0	2	1	–		–		39	3
Crystal Palace	2016–17	Premier League	30	0	2	0	1	0	–		–		33	0
Crystal Palace	2017–18	Premier League	2	0	1	0	1	0	–		–		4	0
Crystal Palace	Total		170	6	15	0	5	1	–		3	0	193	7
Cork City	2018	League of Ireland Premier Division	10	1	0	0	0	0	4 (Note: Two appearances in UEFA Champions League, two in UEFA Europa League)	0	–		14	1
Waterford	2019	League of Ireland Premier Division	20	1	0	0	0	0	–		–		20	1
Career total			614	18	30	0	24	3	6	0	5	1	679	22

=== International ===
Appearances and goals by national team and year
National team	Year	Apps	Goals
Republic of Ireland
Republic of Ireland	2008	2	0
Republic of Ireland	2011	3	0
Republic of Ireland	2013	3	0
Republic of Ireland	2014	1	0
Total		9	0

== Honours ==
Cork City

- FAI Youth Cup: 2000

Hull City

- Football League Third Division runner-up: 2003–04
- Football League One runner-up: 2004–05

Crystal Palace

- Football League Championship play-offs: 2013
- FA Cup runner-up: 2015–16

Republic of Ireland

- Nations Cup: 2011

Individual

- Hull City Player of the Year: 2003–04
