= Colin Healy =

Irish footballer (born 1980)

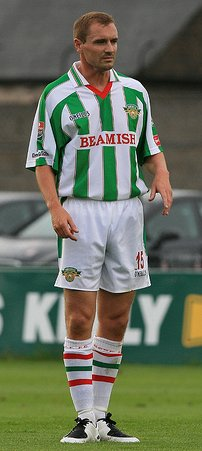
- Healy playing for Cork City in 2007

Personal information
- Full name: Colin Healy
- Date of birth: 14 March 1980 (age 46)
- Place of birth: Cork, Ireland
- Height: 5 ft 9 in (1.75 m)
- Position: Midfielder

Youth career
- 1997: Ballincollig
- 1997: Wilton United

Senior career*
Years	Team	Apps	(Gls)
1998–2003	Celtic	30	(1)
2002–2003	→ Coventry City (loan)	17	(2)
2003–2006	Sunderland	20	(0)
2006	Livingston	9	(2)
2006–2007	Barnsley	8	(0)
2006	→ Bradford City (loan)	2	(0)
2007–2009	Cork City	62	(2)
2009–2011	Ipswich Town	20	(2)
2010	→ Falkirk (loan)	19	(1)
2012–2017	Cork City	110	(5)
Total		297	(15)

International career
1998–1999	Republic of Ireland U18		
2002–2003	Republic of Ireland	13	(1)

Managerial career
- 2020–2023: Cork City
- 2023–2024: Republic of Ireland women (assistant)
- 2025–: Kerry
- * Club domestic league appearances and goals

Colin Healy (born 14 March 1980) is an Irish football manager and former player. He was appointed manager of Cork City FC in late 2020, and held the post until May 2023. He has been the manager of League of Ireland First Division club Kerry FC since May 2025.

He started his senior career at Celtic, spending five years with the Scottish club before joining English side Sunderland in 2003, where he spent three years. He returned to Scotland in 2006 to sign for Livingston. After a short spell with Livingston he returned to England to join Barnsley. After leaving Barnsley in 2007, he joined Irish side Cork City, where he spent two years before joining English side Ipswich Town. He spent two years with Ipswich before returning to the Republic of Ireland to sign for former club Cork City. Healy represented the Republic of Ireland at youth and senior level. He made his senior debut for his country in 2002, going on to win 13 caps, scoring once.

== Early and personal life ==
Healy was born in Ballincollig, County Cork. He came from a sporting family, with his grandfather Paddy Healy having been a Gaelic footballer and hurler who won All-Ireland Senior Football Championship and All-Ireland Senior Hurling Championship medals with the Cork inter-county football and hurling teams in 1945 and 1946.

Married with two children, Healy's wife died in April 2024. His son, Arran Healy, signed with Cork City in mid-2024, later moving to Kerry FC.

== Club career ==
=== Early career ===
Healy played local soccer with Ballincollig and then Wilton United. He attended the FAS/FAI course in Cork run by former Celtic and Cork City midfielder Mike Conroy and from here he was taken to Celtic Park. He would go on to score three goals for Celtic, his first coming in a league game against Dundee in February 2000. His other two goals came in Scottish League Cup ties against Hearts and Stirling Albion. With Celtic he won a Scottish League Cup medal, playing in the team that beat Kilmarnock 3–0 at Hampden on 18 March 2001.

=== Sunderland ===
Sunderland signed Healy from Celtic in 2003. In December 2003 he broke his leg in a match against a former loan club, Coventry City after a challenge by Moroccan international Youssef Safri.

In October 2004, he broke his leg again soon after resuming training with Sunderland, after a tackle from then manager Mick McCarthy. In January 2006, it was announced that Healy's contract with Sunderland had expired, and the midfielder left the club.

=== Livingston and Barnsley ===
Healy joined SPL club Livingston on 10 March 2006 until the end of the season. On 10 August 2006 Healy signed a one-year contract with Barnsley. Having made only 10 appearances for Barnsley, he had his contract cancelled by mutual consent.

=== Cork City and FIFA case ===
On 20 February 2007 he signed a two-year contract with hometown League of Ireland club Cork City, alongside former international colleague Gareth Farrelly. FIFA ruled both players to be unable to play for the club, citing a rule forbidding players from transferring between clubs more than twice in a 12-month period between July and June. FIFA rejected appeals made by both players. On 1 July 2007 both Healy and Gareth Farrelly became eligible to play for Cork City. On this date, they both played for the club's under-21 team against Lifford of Ennis, Co Clare, winning the game 2–0.

Healy made his full Cork City debut against Bohemians when they were beaten in extra time in the Eircom League Cup Quarter Final held at Dalymount Park on 3 July 2007.

Healy signed a two-year contract for Cork in 2009. In April 2009, Healy scored his first goal for Cork at Tallaght Stadium.

=== Ipswich Town ===
On 16 July 2009, it was confirmed that Cork City had accepted a £100,000 bid from Hartlepool United to take Healy and fellow Cork City teammate Denis Behan to Victoria Park, Hartlepool. However, five days later, Hartlepool United manager Chris Turner confirmed that the deal had not happened due to late interest from Ipswich Town. Healy subsequently signed for Ipswich for an undisclosed fee. In January 2010, he signed on-loan with Scottish Premier League club Falkirk. At Falkirk he scored once against Aberdeen.

Returning to Ipswich from the on-loan spell in Scotland, during the League Cup Semi-Final 2011 first leg win by Ipswich Town over Arsenal, it was commented that "Colin Healy made Cesc Fabregas look like Colin Healy". In February 2011 Healy scored his first goal for Ipswich against Doncaster Rovers. His contract was terminated by mutual consent in November 2011.

=== Return to Cork City ===
In 2013, Healy returned to Cork City on a three-year deal. His most memorable moment came against St Patrick's Athletic in 2014 when he scored a late over head kick against a fellow title rival. He and Cork finished runners up behind Dundalk for three years in a row and Healy lost the 2015 FAI Cup to Dundalk before finally winning a trophy in March 2016 in the Presidents Cup and the 2016 FAI Cup final where he came off the bench. He retired from playing in April 2017.

== Coaching career ==
After retirement from playing he was Cork City's "head of academy" for a number of seasons before being appointed "first team head coach" in December 2020. He resigned the post in May 2023.

In February 2024, he was named as Eileen Gleeson's assistant manager of the Republic of Ireland women's national team alongside Emma Byrne on a permanent basis, having been in the role since 2023 while Gleeson was originally in interim charge of the team. Healy left this role in late 2024, when his contract was not extended by the FAI, in circumstances described in some sources as "controversial" and "disgraceful".

On 5 May 2025, he was appointed as manager of League of Ireland First Division club Kerry.

== International career ==
Healy played and scored a goal against Australia at the FIFA World Youth Championship finals in Nigeria in 1999.

He represented his country at the UEFA U-19 Championship in Sweden in 1999, and won a bronze medal.

During the Saipan incident between Mick McCarthy and fellow Cork man Roy Keane at the 2002 FIFA World Cup, Healy was called upon by McCarthy as the replacement should Keane be dropped from the squad. A succession of changes-of-heart by the Manchester United player led to the call-up being delayed and the deadline passing, with Healy unable to join the World Cup squad.

== Career statistics ==
=== Club ===
Appearances and goals by club, season and competition
Club	Season	League			National Cup		League Cup		Other		Total	
Club	Season	Division	Apps	Goals	Apps	Goals	Apps	Goals	Apps	Goals	Apps	Goals
Celtic	1998–99	Scottish Premier League	3	0	0	0	0	0	0	0	3	0
Celtic	1999–00	Scottish Premier League	10	1	1	0	1	0	1 (Note: Appearance(s) in UEFA Cup)	0	13	1
Celtic	2000–01	Scottish Premier League	12	0	0	0	3	1	6	0	21	1
Celtic	2001–02	Scottish Premier League	4	0	1	0	1	1	0	0	6	1
Celtic	2002–03	Scottish Premier League	1	0	2	0	1	0	1	0	5	0
Celtic	Total		30	1	4	0	6	2	8	0	48	3
Coventry City (loan)	2001–02	First Division	17	2	0	0	0	0	—		17	2
Sunderland	2003–04	First Division	20	0	0	0	0	0	0	0	20	0
Sunderland	2004–05	Championship	0	0	0	0	0	0	—		0	0
Sunderland	Total		20	0	0	0	0	0	0	0	20	0
Livingston	2005–06	Scottish Premier League	9	2	0	0	0	0	—		9	2
Barnsley	2006–07	Championship	8	0	0	0	2	0	—		10	0
Bradford City (loan)	2006–07	League One	2	0	2	0	0	0	0	0	4	0
Cork City	2007	Premier Division	18	0	0	0	0	0	0	0	18	0
Cork City	2008	Premier Division	24	0	0	0	0	0	0	0	24	0
Cork City	2009	Premier Division	20	2	0	0	0	0	—		20	2
Cork City	Total		62	2	0	0	0	0	0	0	62	2
Ipswich Town	2009–10	Championship	3	0	0	0	2	0	—		5	0
Ipswich Town	2010–11	Championship	16	2	1	0	5	0	—		22	2
Ipswich Town	2011–12	Championship	1	0	0	0	1	0	—		2	0
Ipswich Town	Total		20	2	1	0	8	0	0	0	29	2
Falkirk (loan)	2009–10	Scottish Premier League	19	1	0	0	0	0	—		19	1
Cork City	2012	Premier Division	21	0	0	0	0	0	—		21	0
Cork City	2013	Premier Division	23	1	0	0	0	0	—		23	1
Cork City	2014	Premier Division	27	2	0	0	0	0	—		27	2
Cork City	2015	Premier Division	20	2	0	0	0	0	2 (Note: Appearances in UEFA Europa League)	0	22	2
Cork City	2016	Premier Division	19	0	0	0	0	0	3	0	22	0
Cork City	Total		110	5	0	0	0	0	5	0	115	5
Career total			297	15	7	0	16	2	13	0	333	17

=== International ===
Appearances and goals by national team and year
National team	Year	Apps	Goals
Republic of Ireland
Republic of Ireland	2002	6	1
Republic of Ireland	2003	7	0
Total		13	1

=== International goals ===
Republic of Ireland score listed first, score column indicates score after each Healy goal.

International goals by date, venue, cap, opponent, score, result and competition
No.	Date	Venue	Cap	Opponent	Score	Result	Competition
1	21 August 2002	Helsinki Olympic Stadium, Helsinki, Finland	4	Finland	2–0	3–0	Friendly

== Honours ==
Celtic

- Scottish Premier League: 2000–01
- Scottish League Cup: 2000–01

Cork City

- FAI Cup: 2007, 2016
- Setanta Sports Cup: 2008
- FAI President's Cup: 2016

Manager

- League of Ireland First Division: 2022

Individual

- PFAI Team of the Year: 2014 Premier Division
- League of Ireland Player of the Year: 2014
