= Lee Martin (footballer, born 1987) =

English footballer

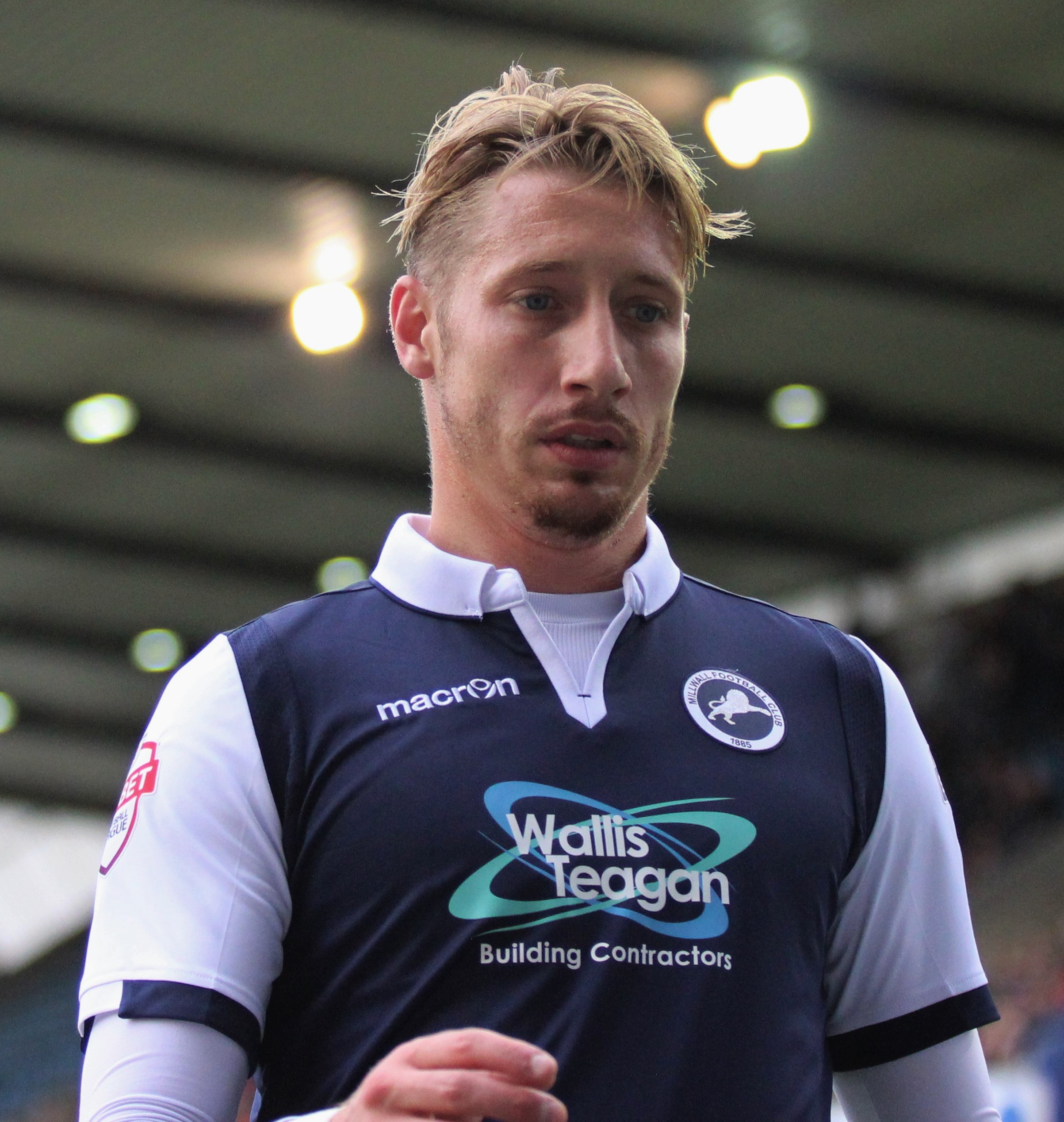
- Martin playing for Millwall in 2015

Personal information
- Full name: Lee Robert Martin
- Date of birth: 9 February 1987 (age 39)
- Place of birth: Taunton, England
- Height: 5 ft 10 in (1.78 m)
- Positions: Winger; attacking midfielder

Team information
- Current team: Whitstable Town (manager)

Youth career
- –2003: Wimbledon
- 2003–2005: Manchester United

Senior career*
Years	Team	Apps	(Gls)
2005–2009	Manchester United	1	(0)
2006	→ Royal Antwerp (loan)	17	(1)
2006	→ Rangers (loan)	7	(0)
2007	→ Stoke City (loan)	13	(1)
2007–2008	→ Plymouth Argyle (loan)	12	(2)
2008	→ Sheffield United (loan)	6	(0)
2008	→ Nottingham Forest (loan)	13	(1)
2009–2013	Ipswich Town	100	(6)
2010–2011	→ Charlton Athletic (loan)	20	(2)
2013–2016	Millwall	61	(2)
2016	→ Northampton Town (loan)	10	(0)
2016–2018	Gillingham	52	(6)
2018–2020	Exeter City	63	(7)
2020–2022	Ebbsfleet United	36	(6)
2022–2023	Dover Athletic	43	(1)
2023–2024	Ramsgate	37	(4)
2024	Ashford United	3	(0)
2024–2025	Ramsgate	28	(2)
2025–2026	Ramsgate	2	(0)

Managerial career
- 2025: Welling United
- 2025: Ramsgate (interim)
- 2025–2026: Ramsgate
- 2026–: Whitstable Town
- * Club domestic league appearances and goals as of 17:10, 16 April 2026 (UTC)

Lee Robert Martin (born 9 February 1987) is an English manager and former professional footballer who plays as a winger, second striker, or attacking midfielder, currently manager at Whitstable Town.

== Playing career ==
=== Manchester United ===
Martin began his career as a trainee with Wimbledon, where he caught the eye of many Premier League teams. Pursued by a number of other top clubs, including Arsenal, Liverpool and Tottenham Hotspur, he signed for Manchester United on 17 December 2003, following a week-long trial in October 2003, during which time he made one appearance for the Manchester United Under-19s team. The compensation package United paid Wimbledon is estimated to be approximately £1 million, with £200k being paid up front, and the rest in instalments based on both his and Manchester United's performance.

Over the remainder of the 2003–04 season, Martin made seven more appearances for United's various youth teams, and was even named as an unused substitute for the Reserves in January 2004. The following season, Martin began as a regular in the Under-18s, but he was soon promoted to the Reserve team, where he began to flourish, scoring goals as well as setting them up, including a hat-trick in one game against Bolton Wanderers Reserves. The 2005–06 season was even more auspicious for Martin; after being named on the bench for two UEFA Champions League group games, he finally made his first team debut in the League Cup against Barnet on 26 October 2005. He was substituted after 75 minutes, allowing Darron Gibson to make his own first team debut, but he was a constant threat to the Barnet goal.

==== Royal Antwerp (loan) ====
In January 2006, Martin joined United's feeder club, Belgian Second Division side Royal Antwerp in a loan deal until May 2006, to gain regular first team experience. During that short spell, he earned the Royal Antwerp Fans' Player of the Year award, and earned the fan-chosen Man of the Match award in five consecutive games. In the run-up to the 2006–07 season, Martin played in six of United's seven friendlies following their summer tour of South Africa. Their match against Celtic attracted the attention of Celtic's Glasgow rivals, Rangers, who sought to take him on loan for the first half of the season.

==== Rangers (loan) ====
Seen as not quite ready for the Premier League, Martin joined the Scottish club with a view to an extension of the loan to the end of the season. After a succession of injuries he failed to establish himself and returned to Manchester United in December 2006, having made just 10 appearances.

==== Stoke City (loan) ====
On 25 January 2007, he was farmed out on loan again, this time to Stoke City. He scored his first senior goal in Stoke's 2–1 win against Southampton on 10 March 2007; it was his only goal in his 14 appearances for the club.

==== Return to United ====
Martin returned to United for the 2007–08 season, and toured the Far East with the club in July 2007. He played in two of the four matches, and scored a spectacular goal against Chinese side Guangzhou Pharmaceutical on 27 July 2007, before being replaced by Patrice Evra. He was again named as an unused substitute for the Community Shield against Chelsea on 5 August 2007. Had he played in the game, it would have been his third game in as many days, having played a total of 149 minutes over the previous two games.

On 26 September 2007, Martin started the League Cup Third Round match against Coventry City, but, with United 1–0 down at half-time, he was substituted, Fraizer Campbell his replacement. However, United conceded again and were knocked out of the cup.

==== Plymouth Argyle (loan) ====
On 5 October 2007, he joined Championship side Plymouth Argyle on a three-month loan deal, with Plymouth beating three other Championship clubs to his signature. He scored his first Argyle goal in the 1–0 victory over Coventry City on 20 October 2007.

Martin discussed an extension to his loan with Sir Alex Ferguson on 2 January, but it was decided that Martin would return to Manchester United at the end of the spell on 5 January.

==== Sheffield United (loan) ====
However, on 10 January 2008, Sheffield United announced that they had managed to capture Martin on loan until the end of the season. Martin made his debut for the Blades in a 2–0 away defeat to local rivals Sheffield Wednesday but his loan spell was marred by a recurring knee injury and he returned to Old Trafford having only played nine games in total for the Blades.

In Manchester United's 2008 pre-season tour of South Arica, Martin scored United's winner against Orlando Pirates in their 1–0 win in the Vodacom Challenge.

==== Nottingham Forest (loan) ====
On 13 August 2008, Martin joined Nottingham Forest on a one-month loan. That evening, he made his first appearance for Forest in their League Cup clash against Morecambe. Forest won the match 4–0, but Martin was booked in the first half. Martin scored his first competitive goal for Forest on 23 August 2008, scoring the opening goal in a 3–2 win over Watford at the City Ground. On 29 August 2008, Nottingham Forest announced an extension of the loan deal until 31 December 2008.

==== Latter days at United ====
Upon returning from his loan, Martin was increasingly used by Ole Gunnar Solskjær in the Manchester United Reserve team as an attacking midfielder and makeshift striker, scoring five goals in the latter half of the season. He was also named as a substitute for the first team's home match against Aston Villa on 5 April 2009, but did not take to the field.

Martin made his first league start for Manchester United in the final match of the 2008–09 Premier League season at Hull City, as United rested key players for the Champions League Final.

=== Ipswich Town ===
Martin joined Ipswich Town on 6 July 2009 for an undisclosed fee thought to be around £1.5 million, signing a four-year contract with the club managed by former Manchester United captain Roy Keane. He made his debut for Ipswich in a friendly against Brentford on 15 July 2009, scoring a goal within eight minutes; Ipswich went on to win the game 3–1. His first competitive start for Ipswich came on 9 August 2009, in a Championship game with Coventry Martin scored his first competitive goal for Ipswich in a 3–3 draw away to Doncaster – it was his 8th appearance for the club. Martin was one of eight players made available for transfer by manager Roy Keane at the end of the 2009–10 season.

==== Charlton Athletic (loan) ====
On 6 August 2010, Martin joined League One club Charlton Athletic for the duration of the 2010–11 season. He scored his first goal for the club in a League Cup match against Shrewsbury Town on 10 August 2010. He scored his only two league goals for Charlton in a 5–1 victory against Peterborough United at London Road. He was recalled by Ipswich on 18 January 2011.

==== Ipswich Town return ====
With Paul Jewell being appointed manager, he recalled Martin back from loan. Martin scored his second goal for the club on 6 August 2011 in the season's opening game at Bristol City. Martin has been a regular player under Paul Jewell and has made 26 appearances, scoring five goals. He was released by Mick McCarthy at the end of the 2012–13 season.

=== Millwall ===
On 4 July 2013, Martin joined Championship club Millwall on a one-year contract. He signed a two-year extension on 17 June 2014. In January 2016 Martin went out on loan to Northampton Town. He was released by Millwall at the end of the 2015–16 season.

=== Gillingham ===
On 6 July 2016 he joined League One club Gillingham on a two-year contract. He suffered a serious ankle injury in a pre-season friendly at the end of the month and early indications were that he would miss the entire season as a result, but he eventually returned to action in February 2017 making his debut against Port Vale in a 1–1 draw.

On 3 August 2017 he was named as Gillingham captain by manager Adrian Pennock. He was released by Gillingham at the end of the 2017–18 season.

=== Exeter City ===
Following his release from Gillingham, Martin joined Exeter City. He made 77 appearances and scored 8 goals over two seasons at the club, helping Exeter reach the 2020 EFL League Two play-off final. He was released following the end of his contract in July 2020.

=== Ebbsfleet United ===
He joined National League South side Ebbsfleet United on 29 July, following his release from Exeter City.

=== Dover Athletic ===
On 4 July 2022, Martin joined recently relegated National League South club Dover Athletic. Martin was not one of the four players to be initially retained following final day survival at the end of the 2022–23 season.

=== Ramsgate ===
On 16 June 2023, Martin signed for Isthmian League South East Division club Ramsgate.

=== Ashford United ===
On 5 July 2024, Martin joined Isthmian South East division rivals Ashford United.

=== Return to Ramsgate ===
On 2 September 2024, Martin returned to Ramsgate.

=== Third spell at Ramsgate ===
In October 2025, following a spell as manager of Welling United, Martin returned to Isthmian League Premier Division club Ramsgate for a third spell, returning in the role of player-coach.

On 16 April 2026, Ramsgate announced that they would begin the process of appointing a new first team manager following the departure of Martin.

== Coaching career ==
On 3 May 2025, Martin was appointed manager of recently relegated Isthmian League Premier Division side Welling United. Following a poor start to the season, Martin was sacked on 2 October 2025.

In November 2025, following the resignation of manager Ben Smith, Martin was appointed interim manager of Ramsgate. On 17 November 2025, Martin was appointed permanently. Martin was brought into Ramsgate with the aim of avoiding relegation; the club finished in 10th place, however following defeat in the Alan Turvey Trophy final, Martin was sacked on 16 April 2026. A statement from the club's board said that Martin had been relieved of his duties because "the playing budget was significantly underspent", which was met with criticism on social media.

On 18 May 2026, Martin was appointed manager of newly promoted Isthmian League South East Division club Whitstable Town.

== Career statistics ==
=== As a player ===
As of end of 11 April 2026

Appearances and goals by club, season and competition
Club	Season	League			National Cup		League Cup		Other		Total	
Club	Season	Division	Apps	Goals	Apps	Goals	Apps	Goals	Apps	Goals	Apps	Goals
Manchester United	2005–06	Premier League	0	0	0	0	1	0	0	0	1	0
Manchester United	2006–07	Premier League	0	0	0	0	0	0	0	0	0	0
Manchester United	2007–08	Premier League	0	0	0	0	1	0	0	0	1	0
Manchester United	2008–09	Premier League	1	0	0	0	0	0	0	0	1	0
Manchester United	Total		1	0	0	0	2	0	0	0	3	0
Royal Antwerp (loan)	2005–06	Belgian First Division	17	1	0	0	0	0	0	0	17	1
Rangers (loan)	2006–07	Scottish Premier League	7	0	0	0	2	0	1 (Note: Appearance in UEFA Cup)	0	10	0
Stoke City (loan)	2006–07	Championship	13	1	1	0	0	0	—		14	1
Plymouth Argyle (loan)	2007–08	Championship	12	2	0	0	0	0	—		12	2
Sheffield United (loan)	2007–08	Championship	6	0	3	0	0	0	—		9	0
Nottingham Forest (loan)	2008–09	Championship	13	1	0	0	1	0	—		14	1
Ipswich Town	2009–10	Championship	16	1	1	0	1	0	—		18	1
Ipswich Town	2010–11	Championship	16	0	0	0	0	0	—		16	0
Ipswich Town	2011–12	Championship	34	5	1	0	1	0	—		36	5
Ipswich Town	2012–13	Championship	34	0	1	0	2	0	—		37	0
Ipswich Town	Total		100	6	3	0	4	0	0	0	107	6
Charlton Athletic (loan)	2010–11	League One	20	2	0	0	1	1	4 (Note: Appearance(s) in Football League Trophy)	0	25	3
Millwall	2013–14	Championship	26	1	1	0	2	0	—		29	1
Millwall	2014–15	Championship	27	1	2	0	0	0	—		29	1
Millwall	2015–16	League One	8	0	1	0	1	0	1	0	11	0
Millwall	Total		61	2	4	0	3	0	1	0	69	2
Northampton Town (loan)	2015–16	League Two	10	0	0	0	0	0	0	0	10	0
Gillingham	2016–17	League One	17	0	0	0	0	0	0	0	17	0
Gillingham	2017–18	League One	35	6	3	0	0	0	1 (Note: Appearance(s) in EFL Trophy)	0	39	6
Gillingham	Total		52	6	3	0	0	0	1	0	56	6
Exeter City	2018–19	League Two	35	1	0	0	2	0	3	0	40	1
Exeter City	2019–20	League Two	28	6	4	0	1	0	4 (Note: Three appearances in EFL Trophy, one appearance in EFL League Two play-offs)	1	37	7
Exeter City	Total		63	7	4	0	3	0	7	1	77	8
Ebbsfleet United	2020–21	National League South	13	2	2	1	—		2 (Note: Appearance(s) in FA Trophy)	1	17	4
Ebbsfleet United	2021–22	National League South	23	4	2	0	—		3 (Note: One appearance in the Kent Senior Cup) (Note: Two appearances in the National League South Play-Offs)	1	28	5
Ebbsfleet United	Total		36	6	4	1	0	0	5	2	45	9
Dover Athletic	2022–23	National League South	43	1	1	0	—		0	0	44	1
Ramsgate	2023–24	Isthmian League South East Division	37	4	6	1	—		3 (Note: Two appearances in FA Trophy, one appearance in Isthmian League South East Division play-offs)	0	46	5
Ashford United	2024–25	Isthmian League South East Division	3	0	4	0	—		0	0	7	0
Ramsgate	2024–25	Isthmian League South East Division	28	2	0	0	—		4 (Note: Two appearances in FA Trophy, one appearance in Alan Turvey Trophy, one appearance in Kent Senior Cup)	0	32	2
Ramsgate	2025–26	Isthmian League Premier Division	2	0	—		—		0	0	2	0
Career Total			524	41	33	2	16	1	26	3	599	47

=== As a manager ===
As of match played 15 April 2026

Managerial record by team and tenure
Team	From	To	Record				
Team	From	To	P	W	D	L	Win %
Welling United	3 May 2025	2 October 2025	13	3	1	9	23.1
Ramsgate	16 October 2025	16 April 2026	34	16	7	11	47.1
Total			47	19	8	20	40.4

== Honours ==
Manchester United

- FA Community Shield: 2007

Ramsgate

- Isthmian League South East Division: 2024–25
