= Ibrahima Sonko =

Senegalese footballer (born 1981)

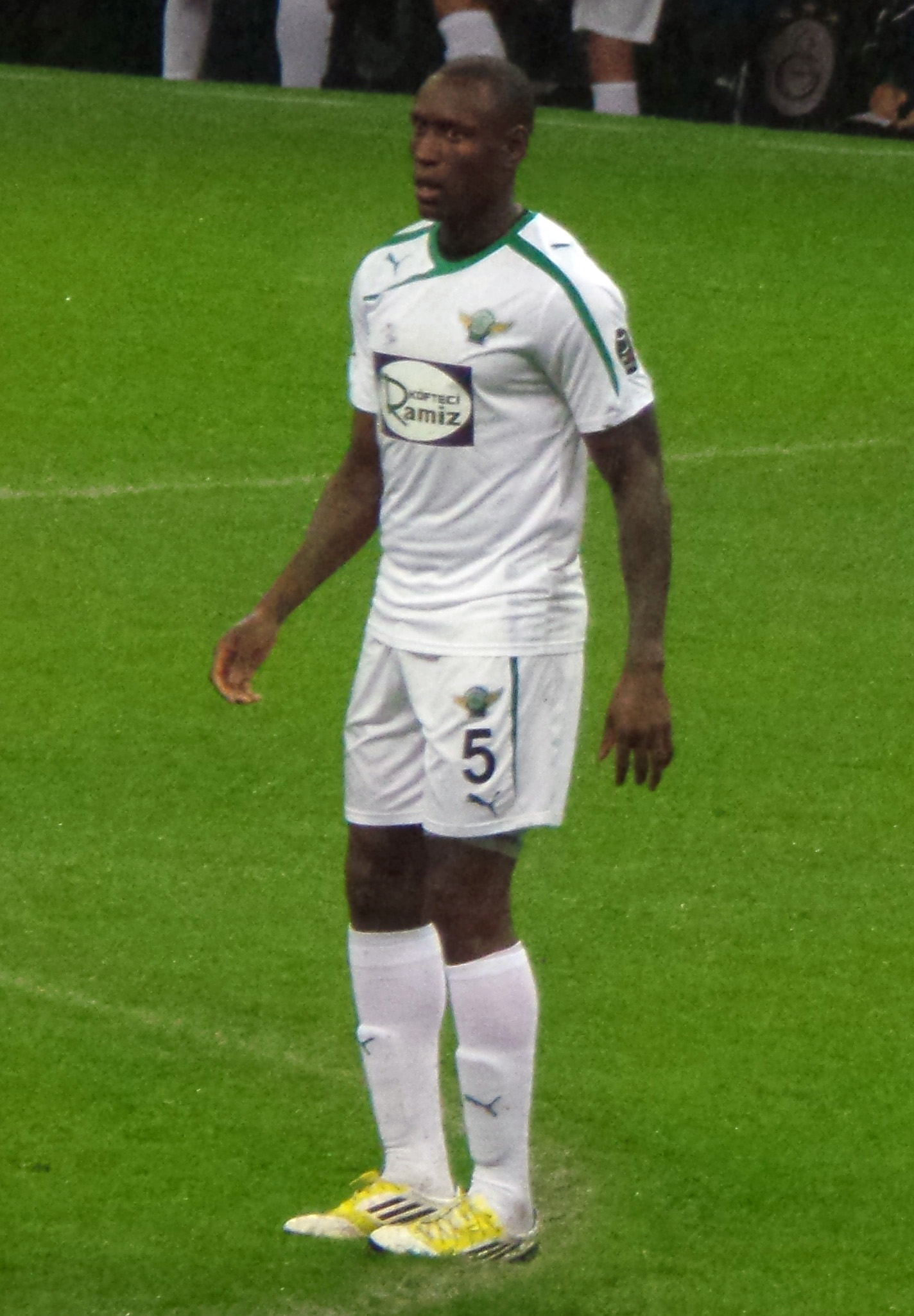
- Sonko playing for Akhisar Belediyespor in 2014

Personal information
- Date of birth: 22 January 1981 (age 45)
- Place of birth: Bignona, Senegal
- Height: 6 ft 3 in (1.91 m)
- Position: Defender

Youth career
- 1995–1996: Olympique Noisy-le-Sec
- 1997–1999: Saint-Étienne

Senior career*
Years	Team	Apps	(Gls)
1999–2002	Grenoble	47	(2)
2002–2004	Brentford	80	(8)
2004–2008	Reading	127	(8)
2008–2011	Stoke City	14	(0)
2009–2010	→ Hull City (loan)	9	(0)
2010–2011	→ Portsmouth (loan)	23	(1)
2011–2012	Ipswich Town	22	(1)
2012–2015	Akhisar Belediyespor	58	(0)
2015–2018	Harlow Town	110	(10)
Total		490	(30)

International career
2008	Senegal	5	(1)
- * Club domestic league appearances and goals

Ibrahima Sonko (born 22 January 1981) is a Senegalese former professional footballer who played as a centre back.

Sonko moved to France from Senegal at a young age and began his career with Olympique Noisy-le-Sec and AS Saint-Étienne, before turning professional with Grenoble. In 2002 Sonko moved to English side Brentford where he spent two seasons before moving to Reading in 2004. Sonko spent four seasons with the Royals and helped them gain promotion to the Premier League in 2005–06. Following their relegation, Sonko joined Stoke City for a fee of £2 million in August 2008. However, he failed to establish himself in the first team at Stoke and spent time out on loan at Hull City and Portsmouth before being released. He spent the 2011–12 season with Ipswich Town and then played for Turkish side Akhisar Belediyespor from 2012 until 2015.

== Club career ==
=== Brentford ===
Sonko was born in Bignona, Senegal but moved to France when he was young. He played with Olympique Noisy-le-Sec and was in the youth team at AS Saint-Étienne before he joined Grenoble in 1999. Sonko helped Grenoble gain promotion from the Championnat National in 2000–01 and in 2002 he left to join English side Brentford. He played 45 times for Brentford in 2002–03, scoring six goals at the Bees finished in 16th position. He played 46 times in 2003–04 as Brentford again finished in a mid-table position this time 17th. His performances for Brentford attracted interest from high placed sides.

=== Reading ===
Sonko joined Reading on a bosman in the summer of 2004. He made 42 appearances in 2004–05 as Reading finished in 7th place missing out on a play-off place by three points. In 2005–06 Sonko was ever-present as the Royals gained promotion to the Premier League in emphatic fashion after winning the league with a record 106 points. During the season, he won the player of the month award for October and was also named in the PFA Team of the Year.

Sonko's first season in the Premier League was eventful. He received a straight red card against Aston Villa for tripping Luke Moore in the penalty area, meaning Reading lost 2–1. He was the subject of further controversy in a match against Chelsea on 14 October 2006, when his challenge left goalkeeper Carlo Cudicini unconscious. Cudicini was carried off the field wearing a neck brace. Sonko stated that he was scared after receiving death threats in connection with the Chelsea match. On 11 December 2006, Sonko signed an extension to his contract with Reading, keeping him at the Madejski Stadium until the summer of 2010. However, on 20 January 2007, he injured knee ligaments when he fell awkwardly whilst playing for Reading in their 3–1 home win against Sheffield United, and it was subsequently announced that he would miss the rest of the 2006–07 season. Sonko played a total of 23 times on 2006–07 as Reading ended the season in 8th position.

He returned to first team action on 20 October 2007 in a 4–2 defeat away to Blackburn Rovers. Sonko went on to play 16 matches for Reading in 2007–08 as they were unable to retain the Premier League status, being relegated in 18th place. Sonko ended the season on a sour note after he and teammate Emerse Faé were suspended by the club after refusing manager Steve Coppell's request to play in a reserve match. Sonko later stated that he wanted to leave Reading after he had become an 'outcast' at the club. Despite this he did start the first three matches of the 2008–09 season where he scored twice against Plymouth Argyle. He also scored against Charlton Athletic but was also sent-off in the match.

=== Stoke City ===
On 29 August 2008, Sonko signed for Premier League club Stoke City for a fee of £2 million, which could rise to £2.25 million depending on appearances. He made his Stoke debut on 14 September 2008, in a 3–2 defeat against Everton. However, he was unable to hold on to his place in the team under Tony Pulis and was mainly used as a substitute. On 20 December 2008, Stoke played away at Blackburn Rovers. Sonko conceded an early penalty after a horribly mistimed tackle on Morten Gamst Pedersenwhich helped Blackburn ease to a 3–0 win, Pulis described it as 'abysmal defending'. Sonko only figured as a substitute for the remainder of the 2008–09 season as the Potters finished in 14th position.

On 1 September 2009, he joined Hull City on loan for the 2009–10 season. Sonko made his debut for Hull on 12 September 2009, in a 4–1 loss away to Sunderland. He made just nine appearances as Hull suffered relegation from the Premier League. He spent the 2010–11 season on loan at Portsmouth. He played 27 times for Pompey, scoring once.

After an unsuccessful time at Stoke he was released at the end of the 2010–11 season.

=== Ipswich Town ===
Following his release from Stoke, Sonko went on trial with his former club Reading but was unable to earn a contract.

On 26 August 2011, Sonko signed for Championship club Ipswich Town on a one-year deal. He scored his first goal for Ipswich in a 3–1 win over Brighton & Hove Albion on 1 October 2011. Sonko struggled with fitness and injuries during his time at Portman Road and was openly criticised by manager Paul Jewell after a 3–1 defeat against Leeds United. He was released by Ipswich at the end of the 2011–12 season.

=== Akhisar Belediyespor ===
On 15 August 2012, Sonko joined newly promoted Turkish side Akhisar Belediyespor of the Süper Lig. He spent three seasons with Akhisar, making 63 appearances.

=== Harlow Town ===
It was announced on 6 August 2015, that Sonko had returned to England and signed for Isthmian League Division One North club Harlow Town. In September of the same year, Sonko revealed he turned down a one-year contract with Scottish Premiership side Kilmarnock to remain with Harlow Town and stay close to his family. Sonko retired at the end of the 2017–18 season.

== International career ==
Sonko was born in Senegal, but moved to France when he was six months and 14 days old. Despite this, Sonko initially elected to play for the Senegal national team. He represented Senegal at U23 level, but declined his call-up to their African Cup of Nations squad of 2006, opting instead to help Reading's ultimately successful bid for promotion to the Premier League. He then announced that he would play for France if selected, but if called up to the Senegal squad before a French call-up, he would play for the African team.

Sonko was named in Senegal's provisional 38-man squad for the African Cup of Nations, which runs from 20 January to 10 February 2008. Senegal coach Henryk Kasperczak also included Sonko in his final 23-man squad making him the only uncapped player in the squad. He finally made his debut for Senegal on 12 January 2008 in their 3–1 win over Namibia in Dakar; he played the entire game in the centre of defence.

== Personal life ==
His cousin Bacary Sagna is also a professional footballer.

== Career statistics ==
=== Club ===
Appearances and goals by club, season and competition
Club	Season	League			National Cup		League Cup		Other^{[A]}		Total	
Club	Season	Division	Apps	Goals	Apps	Goals	Apps	Goals	Apps	Goals	Apps	Goals
Grenoble	1999–2000	Championnat National	1	0	0	0	―		0	0	1	0
Grenoble	2000–01	Championnat National	31	1	0	0	―		0	0	31	1
Grenoble	2001–02	Ligue 2	15	1	3	0	―		0	0	18	1
Grenoble	Total		47	2	3	0	―		0	0	50	2
Brentford	2002–03	Second Division	37	5	4	0	2	1	2	0	45	6
Brentford	2003–04	Second Division	43	3	2	0	1	0	0	0	46	3
Brentford	Total		80	8	6	0	3	1	2	0	91	9
Reading	2004–05	Championship	39	1	3	0	0	0	―		42	1
Reading	2005–06	Championship	46	3	2	0	4	0	―		52	3
Reading	2006–07	Premier League	23	1	0	0	0	0	―		23	1
Reading	2007–08	Premier League	16	0	0	0	0	0	―		16	0
Reading	2008–09	Championship	3	3	―		0	0	―		3	3
Reading	Total		127	8	5	0	4	0	―		136	8
Stoke City	2008–09	Premier League	14	0	1	0	1	0	―		16	0
Stoke City	2009–10	Premier League	0	0	―		1	0	―		1	0
Stoke City	Total		14	0	1	0	2	0	―		17	0
Hull City (loan)	2009–10	Premier League	9	0	0	0	―		―		9	0
Portsmouth (loan)	2010–11	Championship	23	1	1	0	3	0	0	0	27	1
Ipswich Town	2011–12	Championship	22	1	1	0	0	0	0	0	23	1
Akhisar Belediyespor	2012–13	Süper Lig	30	0	1	0	―		―		31	0
Akhisar Belediyespor	2013–14	Süper Lig	28	0	2	0	―		―		30	0
Akhisar Belediyespor	2014–15	Süper Lig	0	0	2	0	―		―		2	0
Akhisar Belediyespor	Total		58	0	5	0	―		―		63	0
Harlow Town	2015–16	Isthmian League First Division North	40	3	5	0	―		5	1	50	4
Harlow Town	2016–17	Isthmian League Premier Division	41	5	1	0	―		7	0	49	5
Harlow Town	2017–18	Isthmian League Premier Division	29	2	4	0	―		1	0	34	2
Harlow Town	Total		110	10	10	0	―		13	1	133	11
Career total			490	30	32	0	12	1	15	1	549	32

A. The "Other" column constitutes appearances and goals in the Football League Trophy, FA Trophy, Isthmian League play-offs and Isthmian League Cup

=== International ===
Appearances and goals by national team and year
National team	Year	Apps	Goals
Senegal	2008	5	1
Total		5	1

=== International goals ===
Senegal score listed first, score column indicates score after each Sonko goal.

International goals by date, venue, cap, opponent, score, result and competition
No.	Date	Venue	Cap	Opponent	Score	Result	Competition	Ref
1	21 June 2008	Stade Léopold Sédar Senghor, Dakar, Senegal	4	Liberia	1–0	3–1	2010 FIFA World Cup qualification	

== Honours ==
Grenoble

- Championnat National: 2000–01

Reading

- Football League Championship: 2005–06

Harlow Town

- Isthmian League First Division North play-offs: 2016

Individual

- Football League Championship Player of the Month: October 2005
- PFA Team of the Year: 2005–06 Championship
