= Brian Murphy (footballer, born 1983) =

Irish footballer

Personal information
- Full name: Brian Edward Murphy
- Date of birth: 7 May 1983 (age 43)
- Place of birth: Waterford, Ireland
- Height: 1.83 m (6 ft 0 in)
- Position: Goalkeeper

Youth career
- Waterford Bohemians

Senior career*
Years	Team	Apps	(Gls)
2000–2003	Manchester City	0	(0)
2003	→ Oldham Athletic (loan)	0	(0)
2003	→ Peterborough United (loan)	1	(0)
2003–2006	Swansea City	13	(0)
2007–2009	Bohemians	97	(0)
2010–2011	Ipswich Town	20	(0)
2011–2015	Queens Park Rangers	2	(0)
2015–2016	Portsmouth	21	(0)
2016–2020	Cardiff City	6	(0)
2020–2022	Waterford	62	(0)
Total		222	(0)

International career
1999–2000	Republic of Ireland U16	5	(0)

Managerial career
- 2026: Waterford (interim)
- * Club domestic league appearances and goals

Brian Edward Murphy (born 7 May 1983) is an Irish former professional footballer who played as a goalkeeper. He is currently the goalkeeping coach at his former club Waterford.

Murphy began his career at English side Manchester City. He spent spells out on loan at Oldham Athletic and Peterborough United but did not make a senior appearance at Manchester City before leaving to join Swansea City in 2003. He spent three seasons at Swansea before returning to his native Ireland to join Bohemians where he spent another three years. In November 2009 he returned to England to join Ipswich Town, where he spent two seasons before joining Queens Park Rangers in 2011. Murphy spent four seasons at Queens Park Rangers before leaving to join Portsmouth in 2015, where he spent one season, before joining Cardiff City in 2016. He spent a further four seasons with Cardiff before once again returning to Ireland in 2020 to join Waterford, where he spent the remainder of his career, finally retiring in 2022.

== Youth career ==
Murphy played football and hurling with one of his primary schools, Dunhill Ns Killea BNS in Dunmore East. As a teenager, Murphy did not harbour ambitions to be a professional football player. He was involved in many sports as a child including gaelic football, hurling and rugby union. It was rugby that Murphy wished to pursue as a career, playing as an outside half for his school and club. He was also the kicker for his teams, and once confessed to being able to "boom a ball a long way from about 14 years old". This is now something that he has developed a reputation for as a professional goalkeeper. At 15 years of age, Murphy had rugby trials with Ireland but ultimately decided not to pursue when Manchester City offered him a place in their youth set-up.

== Senior career ==
=== Manchester City ===
Murphy spent four seasons with Manchester City where the competition for the number one jersey included David Seaman, Nicky Weaver and Carlo Nash, but made the 1st team bench on a number of occasions in the old 1st Division (second tier) and the Premier League. Loaned out to Oldham Athletic in 2002–03, he made his senior début during a loan period with Peterborough United that same season away to Brentford in League One in May 2003.

=== Swansea City ===
Brian Flynn signed him for Swansea City on a free transfer two months later, and he made 26 appearances for the club during the 2003–04 season. He was kept out of the first team in the following two seasons by the form of Frenchman Willy Gueret.

=== Bohemian ===
Murphy was one of the first players signed by Bohemians manager Sean Connor. He made an instant impression in pre-season friendlies, giving him the edge over on-loan Aston Villa goalkeeper Lee Boyle. Murphy kept 19 clean sheets in his 29 league games during the 2007 season to help "Bohs" to the best defensive record in the league.

Murphy ended rumors linking him to Bristol City by signing an improved contract at Bohemians in November 2007.

On 11 January 2008, he was voted "Goalkeeper of the Year" for the 2007 season by the Soccer Writers Association of Ireland.

Murphy was voted (by the supporters) Eircom League of Ireland Premier Division Player of the Season for 2008 receiving 54% of the votes on eircomloi.ie, the league's official website after keeping 20 clean sheets in 33 league games. He added a FAI Cup winners medal to his League winning one when saving two penalties in a penalty shoot-out win over Derry City on 23 November. And the honours kept coming for Murphy as he was announced as the SWAI Player of the Month for November.

On 4 December 2008, he regained the "Goalkeeper of the Year" award as voted by the Soccer Writers Association of Ireland and his performances were further recognised on 8 February 2009 when he became the first goalkeeper to be awarded League of Ireland Player of the Year for the 2008 season.

Murphy continued his outstanding form through the start of the 2009 season and excelled in Bohemians UEFA Champions League qualifying tie against Red Bull Salzburg, saving a penalty from Austrian international Marc Janko at the Red Bull Arena. However Murphy and "Bohs" would depart that competition, losing 2–1 on aggregate.

Back in domestic action on 17 August 2009, Murphy scored and saved twice in a penalty shoot-out against Dundalk in the fourth round of the FAI Cup to help Bohemians through to the next round. He then added to his collection of medals in September as "Bohs" beat Waterford United in the final of the League of Ireland Cup. And he wasn't done yet as a great run of form towards the end of the season helped Murphy and Bohs to their second League of Ireland Premier Division title in a row, winning by 4 points from closest rivals Shamrock Rovers.

The game against Bray Wanderers on 6 November 2009 would be Murphy's 97th and last league appearance for Bohemians before his move to Ipswich Town. In those 97 league games, Murphy kept an outstanding 63 clean sheets.

=== Ipswich Town ===
In late 2009 Murphy agreed to join Ipswich Town during the January 2010 transfer window. This was announced on the same day that Bohemians won their second successive League of Ireland title, and Murphy received his first call into the Irish senior squad. At the start of the January transfer window, Murphy formalized his transfer to Portman Road.

His first appearance in the Town squad came on 10 January 2010 against Leicester City. Arran Lee-Barrett was to start in goal after showing impressive form late in 2009, with Murphy covering on the bench. However, Murphy was injured in the warm up at Leicester and was subsequently unable to fulfill his place on the bench for Town. The injury was to his knee ligaments and kept Murphy out until February, when he made a reserves appearance in a 1–0 win at Norwich. Lee-Barrett was, by this time, beginning to lose the form he had previously shown – something that was highlighted in a defeat away to table propping Peterborough. The following game Murphy was handed his debut against Sheffield Wednesday and kept a clean sheet on 20 February 2010.

Murphy impressed in that game, especially when he denied the Owls with a close range, reflex save in the first half. He retained his place in goal for the next game with Scunthorpe only conceding one goal. His home debut came against Bristol City on 27 February 2010, making a save from David Clarkson. Indeed, it turned out to be a game for the goalkeepers: Murphy's opposite number, Dean Gerken, stole the headlines with a spectacular performance that included five world class saves.

On 7 May 2011 it was confirmed that Murphy had rejected a new contract and would be leaving the club.

=== Queens Park Rangers ===
After impressing on trial Murphy signed a two-year deal with Queens Park Rangers. He made his first start for the club in a 2–0 loss to Rochdale in the League Cup. Despite only playing once in his first two seasons, Murphy signed a new two-year deal following the club's relegation.

=== Portsmouth ===
On 8 August 2015, Murphy signed a deal until January with Portsmouth, making his debut for the club in a 3–0 home win against Dagenham & Redbridge on the same day.

=== Cardiff City ===
On 2 September 2016, Murphy joined Football League Championship side Cardiff City. He was released at the end of the 2018–19 season. However, he was re-signed by the club in August 2019 as injury cover.

=== Waterford ===
On 12 February 2020, it was announced that Murphy had signed for his hometown club Waterford of the League of Ireland Premier Division. After 3 seasons with the club, Murphy announced his retirement from football in January 2023.

== International career ==
Murphy represented the Republic of Ireland Under-16 team at the 2000 UEFA European Under-16 Football Championship and the Under-19 team at the 2002 UEFA European Under-19 Football Championship. He was a regular in the Ireland under-19 squad under Brian Kerr and was preferred to Aston Villa goalkeeper Wayne Henderson for the European under-19 Championships qualifiers and finals in 2002 until a shoulder injury allowed Henderson to reclaim his place. He has been capped since at under-20 and under-21 levels.

On 6 November 2009, Murphy was called up to the Ireland squad for the World Cup play-offs against France following the withdrawal of Coventry City's Keiren Westwood. He was not called up again until 3 March 2014 for the friendly versus Serbia following the withdrawal of Rob Elliot.

== Coaching career ==
After retiring from playing, Murphy became goalkeeping coach at Waterford, the club where he had retired. On 2 May 2026, he was named interim manager of the club following the sacking of manager Jon Daly. He was in charge for one game, a 3–3 draw with Dundalk before the quick appointment of new manager Graham Coughlan.

== Career statistics ==
=== Playing career ===
Appearances and goals by club, season and competition
Club	Season	League			National Cup		League Cup		Europe		Other		Total	
Club	Season	Division	Apps	Goals	Apps	Goals	Apps	Goals	Apps	Goals	Apps	Goals	Apps	Goals
Manchester City	2001–02	First Division	0	0	0	0	0	0	—		—		0	0
Oldham Athletic (loan)	2002–03	Second Division	0	0	0	0	0	0	—		0 (Note: Appearances in Football League Trophy)	0	0	0
Peterborough United (loan)	2002–03	Second Division	1	0	0	0	0	0	—		0	0	1	0
Swansea City	2003–04	Third Division	11	0	0	0	1	0	—		1	0	13	0
Swansea City	2004–05	League Two	2	0	0	0	0	0	—		0	0	2	0
Swansea City	2005–06	League One	0	0	0	0	0	0	—		3	0	3	0
Swansea City	Total		13	0	0	0	1	0	—		4	0	18	0
Bohemians	2007	League of Ireland Premier Division	29	0	3	0	3	0	—		—		35	0
Bohemians	2008	League of Ireland Premier Division	33	0	5	0	1	0	4 (Note: Appearances in UEFA Intertoto Cup)	0	—		43	0
Bohemians	2009	League of Ireland Premier Division	35	0	4	0	2	0	2 (Note: Appearances in UEFA Champions League)	0	2 (Note: Appearances in Setanta Sports Cup)	0	45	0
Bohemians	Bohemians Total		97	0	12	0	6	0	6	0	2	0	123	0
Ipswich Town	2009–10	Championship	16	0	0	0	0	0	—		—		16	0
Ipswich Town	2010–11	Championship	4	0	0	0	5	0	—		—		9	0
Ipswich Town	Total		20	0	0	0	5	0	—		—		25	0
Queens Park Rangers	2011–12	Premier League	0	0	0	0	1	0	—		—		1	0
Queens Park Rangers	2012–13	Premier League	0	0	0	0	0	0	—		—		0	0
Queens Park Rangers	2013–14	Championship	2	0	0	0	2	0	—		0 (Note: Appearances in EFL Championship play-offs)	0	4	0
Queens Park Rangers	2014–15	Premier League	0	0	0	0	1	0	—		—		1	0
Queens Park Rangers	Total		2	0	0	0	4	0	—		0	0	6	0
Portsmouth	2015–16	League Two	21	0	4	0	0	0	—		0	0	25	0
Cardiff City	2016–17	Championship	5	0	1	0	0	0	—		—		6	0
Cardiff City	2017–18	Championship	1	0	1	0	2	0	—		—		4	0
Cardiff City	2018–19	Premier League	0	0	0	0	0	0	—		—		0	0
Cardiff City	2019–20	Championship	0	0	0	0	0	0	—		0	0	0	0
Cardiff City	Total		6	0	2	0	2	0	—		0	0	10	0
Waterford	2020	League of Ireland Premier Division	16	0	0	0	—		—		—		16	0
Waterford	2021	League of Ireland Premier Division	24	0	2	0	—		—		1 (Note: Appearances in 2021 League of Ireland promotion/relegation playoffs)	0	27	0
Waterford	2022	League of Ireland First Division	22	0	0	0	—		—		1 (Note: Appearances in the 2022 League of Ireland promotion/relegation playoffs)	0	23	0
Waterford	Total		62	0	2	0	—		—		2	0	66	0
Career total			222	0	20	0	18	0	6	0	8	0	270	0

=== Managerial career ===
As of match played 4 May 2026

Managerial record by team and tenure
Team	From	To	Record							
Team	From	To	G	W	D	L	GF	GA	GD	Win %
Waterford (interim)	2 May 2026	6 May 2026	1	0	1	0	3	3	+0	0.00
Total			1	0	1	0	3	3	+0	0.00

== Honours ==
Swansea City

- Football League Trophy: 2005–06

Bohemian

- League of Ireland: 2008, 2009
- FAI Cup: 2008
- League of Ireland Cup: 2009

Queens Park Rangers

- Football League Championship play-offs: 2014

Individual

- SWAI Goalkeeper of the Year: 2007, 2008, 2009
- League of Ireland Player of the Year: 2008
- Bohemians Player of the Year: 2007
- PFAI Team of the Year: 2007, 2008, 2009
