= Jack Ainsley =

English footballer (born 1990)

Personal information
- Date of birth: 17 September 1990 (age 36)
- Place of birth: Ipswich, England
- Height: 5 ft 11 in (1.80 m)
- Position: Centre-back

Team information
- Current team: Felixstowe & Walton United (player/joint manager)

Youth career
- 2002–2009: Ipswich Town

Senior career*
Years	Team	Apps	(Gls)
2009–2013	Ipswich Town	4	(0)
2009	→ Rushden & Diamonds (loan)	1	(0)
2010	→ Histon (loan)	2	(0)
2013	→ Chelmsford City (loan)	15	(0)
2013–2016	Lowestoft Town	103	(22)
2016–2018	Leiston	96	(21)
2018–2019	Felixstowe & Walton United	35	(14)
2019–2023	Stowmarket Town	96	(21)
2023–	Felixstowe & Walton United	30	(0)

International career
2006	England U17	4	(3)

Managerial career
- 2025–: Felixstowe & Walton United
- * Club domestic league appearances and goals as of 10:54, 5 September 2024 (UTC)

Jack Ainsley (born 17 September 1990) is an English footballer who is player/joint manager at Felixstowe & Walton United.

== Club career ==
=== Early career ===
Born in Ipswich, Suffolk, His father George Ainsley and brother Stuart Ainsley also were at Ipswich as youngsters but never broke into the first team. Ainsley first started his career as a striker with an impressive goal ratio at youth level but since his professional contract Ainsley has currently adapted to right back or centre back.

=== Ipswich Town ===
Ainsley signed a one-year professional contract on 9 June 2009 with Ipswich Town despite interest from a number of Premier League clubs. Ainsley made his debut for Ipswich Town in a 3–3 draw with Shrewsbury Town after extra time in the League Cup, which was won 4–2 in a penalty shootout.

On 30 April 2010 he signed a one-year extension with the club. On 7 August he made his Football League debut replacing Mark Kennedy in the 89th minute in a 3–1 win over Middlesbrough. In April 2011 he was awarded an initial six-month contract extension by the club.

Ainsley made his first league start for Ipswich, playing as a centre back in their 7–1 away defeat to Peterborough on Saturday 21 August 2011. On 20 December 2011 Jack Ainsley signed a new contract keeping him at Portman Road until June 2013.

==== Rushden & Diamonds (loan) ====
On 6 November 2009, Ainsley went on loan to Rushden & Diamonds. He only made one appearance which angered the then Ipswich manager Roy Keane and the local press. Keane quoted in a press conference: "He certainly won't be going back there. None of our players will be going there. It's not the first time that club's done that to a player. Not at this club, but I've spoken to other managers. If a club comes in and we feel he might get a reasonable chance we might send him out again, which is why we send them out on loan. When a player's really not given an opportunity then you have concerns. But, as I say, I think it's happened to one or two other players who've gone there. There's a bit of history with their manager Justin Edinburgh you see. There's a bit of history with everyone.".

==== Histon (loan) ====
On 19 November 2010, Ainsey went on loan to Histon, struggling at the foot of the Conference National, on a one-month deal. He went straight into their squad for the match at Luton Town on 20 November 2010, but could not prevent the side from losing 5–1; Histon were relegated, having finished bottom of the table, at the end of the season.

==== Chelmsford City (loan) ====
On 26 February 2013, Ainsley joined Conference South side Chelmsford City on a month's loan. On 27 March the loan was extended until the end of the season.

=== Lowestoft Town ===
In July 2013, Ainsley signed a two-year contract to play with Isthmian League Premier Division side Lowestoft Town. This will see him line up alongside his brother Stuart, who was already at the club.

=== Leiston ===
In February 2016, Ainsley joined Isthmian League Premier Division side Leiston.

=== Felixstowe & Walton United ===
In June 2018, Ainsley signed for Felixstowe & Walton United.

=== Stowmarket Town ===
In June 2019, Ainsley signed for Stowmarket Town.

=== Return to Felixstowe ===
He returned to Felixstowe & Walton United in May 2023.

== International career ==
On 30 June 2006, Ainsley was called into the England U17 squad playing in the Nordic Cup. Ainsley scored on his debut against Sweden in a 4–2 win and then scored two as England defeated Norway 2–1. Ainsley won four caps scoring three goals but England lost in the final to Denmark 4–0.

== Club statistics ==
As of match played 29 September 2012

Appearances and goals by club, season and competition
Club	Season	League			FA Cup		League Cup		Other		Total	
Club	Season	Division	Apps	Goals	Apps	Goals	Apps	Goals	Apps	Goals	Apps	Goals
Ipswich Town	2009–10	Championship	0	0	0	0	1	0	—		1	0
Ipswich Town	2010–11	Championship	1	0	0	0	1	0	—		2	0
Ipswich Town	2011–12	Championship	1	0	0	0	1	0	—		2	0
Ipswich Town	2012–13	Championship	2	0	0	0	1	0	—		3	0
Ipswich Town	Total		4	0	0	0	4	0	0	0	8	0
Rushden & Diamonds (loan)	2009–10	Conference Premier	1	0	0	0	—		0	0	1	0
Histon (loan)	2010–11	Conference Premier	2	0	0	0	—		0	0	2	0
Chelmsford City (loan)	2012–13	Conference South	15	0	0	0	—		0	0	15	0
Career total			22	0	0	0	4	0	0	0	26	0
