= Billy Clark (footballer, born 1991) =

English footballer

Personal information
- Date of birth: 20 October 1991 (age 35)
- Place of birth: Ipswich, England
- Height: 5 ft 10 in (1.78 m)
- Position: Midfielder

Youth career
- Ipswich Town

Senior career*
Years	Team	Apps	(Gls)
2009–2011	Ipswich Town	3	(0)
2011–2015	Bury Town	71	(25)
- * Club domestic league appearances and goals as of 18:26, 11 August 2013 (UTC)

Billy Clark (born 20 October 1991) is an English retired professional footballer. He previously played in the Football League for Ipswich Town.

== Club career ==
Clark made his début for Ipswich as a substitute in a 1–1 draw with Doncaster Rovers on 17 April 2010. He made two further appearances from the bench for Ipswich in the 2009/10 season against Newcastle United and Sheffield United. In April 2011 he made the news by tweeting that he was happy to be leaving the club when his contract expired at the end of the 2010–11 season, prompting a response from manager Paul Jewell that he could leave immediately if he felt this way. Later, after speaking to Clark, Jewell forgave the player and allowed him to remain at the club until the end of the season.
