= SSFC =

The abbreviation SSFC may refer to, in terms of educational establishments:

- Scarborough Sixth Form College, North Yorkshire
- Shrewsbury Sixth Form College, Shropshire
- Solihull Sixth Form College, West Midlands
- Stockton Sixth Form College, Stockton-on-Tees
- Sir Sandford Fleming College, Ontario

and in terms of sport, to:

- Sagawa Shiga F.C.
- Seattle Sounders FC
- Shanghai Shenhua F.C.
- Sivutsa Stars F.C.
- Sony Sugar F.C.
- South Shields F.C.
- South Sydney Football Club
- Southland Spirit FC
- Stourport Swifts F.C.

and also, to:

- South Shields Folk Club, South Shields
- Special Security Force Command, a paramilitary law enforcement body in Bahrain
