= Scarborough Sixth Form College =

College in North Yorkshire, England

Location
- Sandybed Lane; Scarborough, North Yorkshire, YO12 5LF; England; 54.27529°N 0.43076°W

Information
- Type: Sixth form
- Established: 1973
- Local authority: North Yorkshire Council
- Department for Education URN: 130593 Tables
- Ofsted: Reports
- Chair of Governors: Rachel Dolby
- Principal: Philip Rumsey
- Gender: Mixed
- Age: 16+
- Enrolment: 1,127
- Website: http://www.s6f.org.uk/

Scarborough Sixth Form College is located on the outskirts of Scarborough, North Yorkshire, England.

== Background ==
The Sixth form college offers a variety of study courses to around 1,000 mostly 16- to 19-year-olds. Courses range from level 2 (GCSE) to level 3 (Advanced Level and BTEC). A 2001 Ofsted inspection described the college as "a particularly successful college", being rated 23rd in a list of the United Kingdom's most successful colleges in that year.

An Ofsted inspection from 2016 said the college was a "good college" and it "displays elements that are outstanding".

Students take AS or A2 (A-Level) qualifications, as well as BTECs and GCSEs.

In 2012 the college opened a new study space called "The Hub"; it was opened by former students, Howard Wilson and Toby Jepson.

The £3 million refit of the college, including the library facility, was fully completed in November 2012.

== Notable former students ==
- Eliza Carthy, folk musician
- John Fendley, television presenter & former producer of Soccer AM
- Toby Jepson, singer and songwriter
- Melanie Leng, isotope geoscientist
- Mikey North, actor in Coronation Street
- Timothy Sheader, artistic director at Regent's Park Open Air Theatre
- Little Angels, hard rock band of the late 1980s to mid-1990s
- Howard Wilson, professor of plasma physics
- Gavin Williamson, Conservative MP former Secretary of State for Defence, and former Secretary of State for Education
