= Jimmy Bullard =

English footballer & television personality (born 1978)

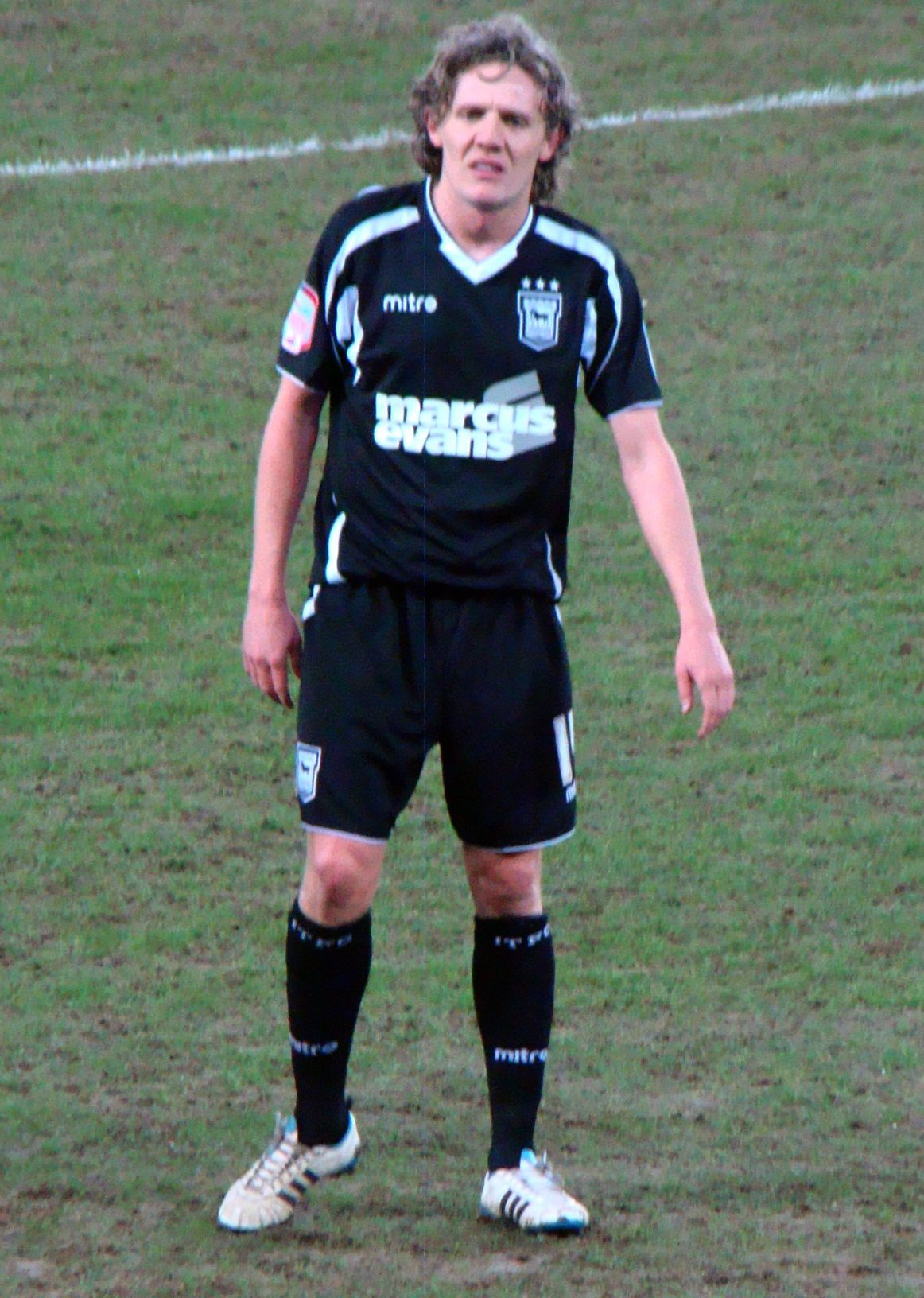
- Bullard playing for Ipswich Town in 2011

Personal information
- Full name: James Richard Bullard
- Date of birth: 23 October 1978 (age 48)
- Place of birth: East Ham, London, England
- Height: 5 ft 10 in (1.78 m)
- Position: Midfielder

Youth career
- West Ham United

Senior career*
Years	Team	Apps	(Gls)
- Corinthian
1997–1998	Dartford		
1998–1999	Gravesend & Northfleet		
1999–2001	West Ham United	0	(0)
2001–2003	Peterborough United	66	(11)
2003–2006	Wigan Athletic	145	(10)
2006–2009	Fulham	39	(6)
2009–2011	Hull City	23	(6)
2011	→ Ipswich Town (loan)	16	(5)
2011–2012	Ipswich Town	21	(1)
2012	Milton Keynes Dons	2	(0)
Total		312	(39)

Managerial career
- 2016–2017: Leatherhead
- * Club domestic league appearances and goals

James Richard Bullard (born 23 October 1978) is an English former professional footballer, coach and television personality. He was the co-host of the Saturday morning Sky Sports show Soccer AM.

As a player he was a midfielder and played youth football at West Ham United before moving to Gravesend & Northfleet in 1998. Two seasons at Peterborough United was followed by a spell at Wigan Athletic where he scored ten goals in 145 league appearances, helping them to their first promotion to the Premier League. Bullard was known for being a passionate leader on the pitch and for his funny antics, playing football with a smile throughout his career. Paul Jewell described Bullard as the heart and soul of the dressing room.

A transfer to Fulham in 2006 resulted in six goals in 39 league appearances before Bullard moved to Hull City in 2009. A loan move to Ipswich Town commenced in 2011 where he scored on his debut. He later moved permanently to Ipswich and ended his career at Milton Keynes Dons. On 1 October 2012, Bullard retired from professional football, because problems with his knees meant he was unable to keep up the playing demands of up to two games a week. He was most recently manager at Leatherhead between September 2016 and May 2017.

== Club career ==
=== Early career ===
Bullard was born in East Ham, London. He played schools' representative football for Bexley Primary Schools FA and Kent Schools FA whilst at primary school, and then represented North Kent Schools FA whilst a pupil at Erith School. He started his career in non-League football with amateur club Corinthian before moving to Dartford, where he made 26 appearances in the 1997–98 season. He then moved to Gravesend & Northfleet before being signed by the club he supported as a boy, West Ham United, for a fee of £30,000 in 1999. He did not manage to break into the team, however, and was given a free transfer at the end of the 2000–01 season. In May 2001, Bullard signed for Second Division club Peterborough United on a three-year contract. Initially he was on trial but he was offered a permanent deal after impressing manager Barry Fry with his pace, energy and eye for goal. After impressing with Peterborough, Bullard earned a move to Wigan Athletic for £275,000 in January 2003.

=== Wigan Athletic ===
Bullard quickly established himself in the Wigan first team and was named in the PFA Division Two Team of the Year for 2002–03. He helped Wigan secure promotion to the FA Premier League in the 2004–05 season and an appearance in the 2006 Football League Cup Final, which they lost 4–0 to Manchester United.

=== Fulham ===
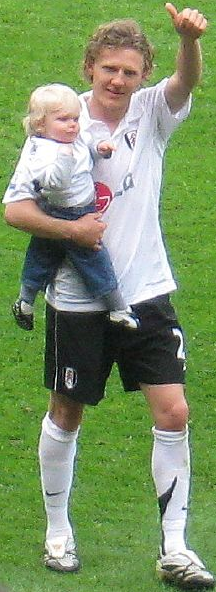
Bullard at Fulham with his son in 2008

On 28 April 2006, it was announced that Bullard would sign for Fulham at the end of the 2005–06 season after a £2.5 million offer from the London club triggered a release clause in his contract. On 16 May, Bullard was officially confirmed as a Fulham player. Bullard's Fulham debut came as the team lost 5–1 to Manchester United on 20 August. His first goal for Fulham came against Bolton Wanderers on 26 August, a last-minute penalty kick to level the scores at 1–1. Three days later, after he scored a 28-yard (26 m) curling free kick against Sheffield United in a 1–0 win, Fulham boss Chris Coleman hailed Bullard as "the best £2million we've ever spent".

On 9 September, Bullard dislocated his kneecap in a match against Newcastle United. This injury was thought to keep him out for six to eight weeks. However three days later it was revealed that Bullard would in fact be out for up to nine months with cruciate knee ligament damage. Fulham's new manager Lawrie Sanchez announced that the midfielder was aiming to return around October 2007. However, he did not make a first team appearance until 12 January 2008, coming off the bench to play against West Ham. Bullard then came on as a half time substitute in a 2–1 win against Aston Villa on 3 February, setting up the equaliser then scoring the winning goal from a 25-yard (23 m) free kick and winning the man of the match award. He scored an identical free kick weeks later, to rescue a point against Blackburn Rovers and keep Fulham's hope of Premier League survival alive.

After missing a large part of the season due to injury, his return to the team, along with club captain Brian McBride, sparked Fulham into a run of form which saw them move out of the bottom three with one game remaining, after a 2–0 victory over Birmingham City. After helping Fulham out of the relegation zone, Bullard vowed to stay at Fulham to remain loyal with the club.

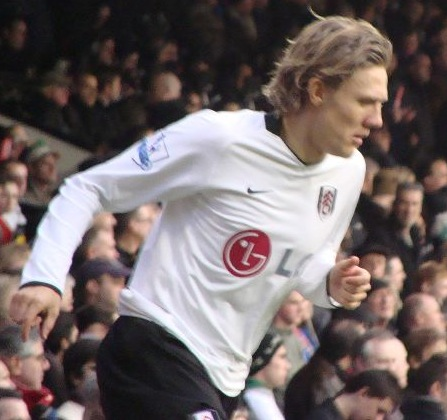
Bullard playing for Fulham in 2008

At the start of the 2008–09 season, Bullard found himself being linked with various clubs, with his former club, Wigan, expressing an interest in signing him. However, newly appointed manager Roy Hodgson said that he would not sell Bullard, insisting he was a key player. Bullard claimed he was in talks to sign a new deal with the club. However, this was denied by the club. The uncertainty surrounding Bullard's future at Fulham left him "very confused". Despite being regularly featured in the first team in the first half of the season, it was reported on Sky Sports that Bullard was told by the club that he could leave the club.

=== Hull City ===
On 23 January 2009, Bullard completed a move to Hull City for £5 million, a record transfer fee paid by the club. In an interview broadcast on BBC's Football Focus on 31 January, Bullard discussed his reasons for leaving Fulham:

I had sixteen months left on my contract, which to me – I've been out sixteen months, I know it isn't a long time – and I wasn't willing to play with sixteen months... with one year left on my contract, and I did tell them that, I made that clear, even though I am under contract. Also I didn't feel I had the backing from the club, so I felt like it was time to move on. I felt like Fulham didn't want me and it was as simple as that really. I was in talks with Fulham over a contract and I was told I'm not getting a new contract and I can leave in January. So for a player to be told that was quite harsh, you know, and I came up to speak to Hull and it was totally different, and it sort of made it a lot easier for me. I'm only human, I just wanted to play for a team who really wanted me, and Hull showed me that really.

— Jimmy Bullard,

Fulham boss Roy Hodgson said "He's been seeking the type of contract we couldn't give him. I congratulate Hull and Jimmy on getting the contract he wanted. It wasn't just wage demands prompting Jimmy to go, but the length of contract too". Bullard signed a four-and-a-half-year deal with Hull. In 2016, Bullard, having retired by that time, claimed that Hull presented him with a contract containing a "misprint" for 15,000 pounds per week more than what Bullard said was the originally agreed salary of 40,000 pounds per week and he signed on knowing that it was a "misprint."

Bullard made his Hull debut as a substitute in their 28 January match against West Ham, but picked up a knee injury during the game. The injury was to the same knee that he dislocated while at Fulham, but was not initially thought to be related to the prior damage. It was sufficiently serious to necessitate Bullard flying back to the same surgeon, Richard Steadman, in the United States for further knee surgery. On 19 February, it was declared that he would be out for the rest of the season after the cruciate ligament surgery. He returned to action on 6 October, in a reserve team match against Bolton, scoring a long range goal. His first team return was off the bench on 19 October against his old club, Fulham, a 2–0 defeat. He scored his first goal for Hull, a free kick, against West Ham on 21 November. He also scored his second goal for the club in the same game, this time from the penalty spot. His third goal for Hull came against Manchester City, again from the penalty spot. His goal celebration saw him wagging his finger at his Hull teammates who had sat down in a circle, imitating Hull manager Phil Brown's on-pitch team talk from the same fixture the previous season where he sat his team on the pitch for a half-time dressing-down. Amused, Brown himself applauded Bullard's celebration.

Against Aston Villa on 5 December, Bullard went up for an aerial challenge against James Milner and landed awkwardly, injuring his knee. After a scan it was confirmed that he would be out for six to eight weeks with an injury to the left knee. This came after receiving the player of the month accolade the Friday previous. He made a scoring return in February 2010 for Hull reserves. On 27 March he scored from the penalty spot against former club Fulham, giving Hull the lead in a 2–0 victory. His next penalty came against Sunderland on 24 April, but he hit the post with Hull a goal down receiving jeers from some of the Hull support, who viewed his high transfer fee and wages partly responsible for the club's financial problems. Bullard was substituted at half-time, with Hull needing to win to avoid relegation.

On 27 June, Hull's chairman confirmed that Bullard was available for loan and was free to speak to Celtic. However, Hull officials said on 12 July that Celtic and the player had been unable to reach agreement on his wage demands. The club opted to exclude Bullard from pre-season friendlies to reduce the risk of injury preventing the player's sale. Hull were facing the prospect of administration to tackle the club's heavy debts; they had very little choice but to offload Bullard, who was one of the club's highest earners, in order to raise additional revenue and reduce the club's large wage bill. At the start of 2010–11 Bullard was not given a squad number, but some time later he was handed number 27 and played the full 90 minutes against Derby County, before going on to play in a further three games. Bullard scored a last minute winner against Sheffield United at Bramall Lane on 26 December, returning after an injury.

On 22 July 2011, Bullard was suspended by Hull City following an incident at Hull's training camp in Slovenia the previous week, which was believed to be a breach of the club's alcohol policy. On 18 August, Hull announced that they had terminated Bullard's contract. Bullard received an out of court settlement after the unlawful termination of his contract.

=== Ipswich Town ===
On 27 January 2011, he joined Ipswich Town on loan. He scored on his debut in a 2–1 victory at Derby County on 1 February. Hull said his exit saved the club £320,000 in wages, as he had signed a £45,000-a-week contract for them while they were still in the Premier League. Bullard scored five times in 16 appearances for Ipswich. He won the Supporters' Player of the Year award, despite only being with the club for three months. Some supporters called for manager Paul Jewell to sign him on a permanent basis. However, with Bullard's wages being so high at Hull, chances of a permanent move being agreed looked unlikely. On 3 April, Bullard admitted that he would be interested in a move to Ipswich, and that he would be prepared to take a pay-cut.

On 25 August, Bullard joined Ipswich Town on a permanent deal, signing a two-year contract. After starting positively, injuries meant he spent the majority of the remainder of the season on the bench. Bullard was suspended for two weeks while Michael Chopra was fined two weeks wages by the club due to being late to training after a night out in Newcastle. Jewell explained that Bullard and Chopra committed the same offence, but Chopra was suffering from off-the-field issues, therefore it would be inappropriate to suspend him. Jewell highlighted that Bullard "loved playing football and training", deciding that a two-week suspension was the best way to discipline him. Jewell admitted "It's never easy to suspend a player who I have signed twice, who is the life and soul of the dressing room".

After serving his suspension Bullard was reintroduced back into the first team making a number of first team appearances, but was widely used as an impact substitute. Bullard left Ipswich by mutual consent in August 2012; even though he was highly rated by Jewell he was unable to guarantee him regular first-team football.

=== Milton Keynes Dons and retirement ===
On 28 August 2012, Bullard signed a short-term contract with Milton Keynes Dons, with a deal running until 31 December, but he announced his retirement from football on 1 October of the same year due to injuries. Bullard said "In the summer I knew I wanted to give it one last crack and show people what I could do, But what I think with my strong head and what I could physically do are two different things. My head tells me I can do it, but my body tells me, no Jim, you can't." The following day, he was reported to have joined non-League side Holland as a player coach, with Holland chairman Mark Sorrell saying: "Jimmy is a family friend and has agreed to help us out. He will take the coaching sessions and will play three or four times a season". However, the deal fell through, with Sorrell saying: "The situation has got right out of hand. Jimmy likes to keep himself to himself and he was just coming down to help us out".

== International career ==
Although English by birth, Bullard has a German grandmother and was therefore eligible for the German national team. In the run-up to the 2006 FIFA World Cup, it was reported that Bullard was contemplating an international call-up from the Nationalmannschaft, having made his interest known to the national coach Jürgen Klinsmann. He was called into the England squad in August 2008 for the 2010 FIFA World Cup qualifiers against Andorra and Croatia in September, but did not feature in either match. He was called up on three occasions.

== Managerial career ==
On 17 September 2016, Bullard was named manager of Isthmian League Premier Division side Leatherhead. He left the club at the end of the season.

== Outside football ==
In 2014 Bullard released his autobiography Bend It like Bullard which told the story of his footballing career and became a best-seller. Bullard has made a number of appearances as a pundit for BT Sport and the BBC most notably in the 2014 FA Cup final between Arsenal and Hull City, the latter who Bullard had previously played for. In addition Bullard has made multiple television appearances on Soccer AM and Goals on Sunday.

In November 2014, he was announced as a contestant in the fourteenth series of I'm a Celebrity...Get Me Out of Here! Since his exit from the show, Bullard has made special appearances on ITV's annual charity show, Text Santa, The Xtra Factor, Celebrity Juice and Alan Carr's Specstacular.

Alongside comedians Rob Beckett and Ian Smith, Bullard hosted UK television channel Dave's comedy-football podcast The Magic Sponge. The podcast was an irreverent look at the lives of professional footballers and included appearances from guests including Barry Fry, Dean Windass and Lee Hendrie. Bullard now hosts his own fishing podcast and video series Off The Hook with Jimmy Bullard. Bullard has continued to make television appearances in 2015, as a guest on Channel 4's Sunday Brunch and ITV2's Reality Bites and as a pundit on Match of the Day for the FA Cup third round tie between Arsenal and Hull City.

Bullard founded Extra Time Management with his friend and manager James Erwood. Extra Time Management is an organisation which helps professional sports persons who are about to or are already retired from their chosen sport, to open doors to new careers in media and broadcasting. Extra Time Management firstly helps sports persons deal with depression and other mental health issues and then begins to find new careers for their clients. A percentage of the company's commissions is donated to multiple charities.

Bullard was the host's assistant on the first series of ITV comedy panel show Play to the Whistle, starring alongside Bradley Walsh, Frank Lampard and Holly Willoughby. Bullard has co-hosted Sky Sports' Soccer AM since August 2017, initially alongside John Fendley and Lloyd Griffith. As of June 2020, he now co-hosts alongside Fendley, with Griffith having stepped down in July 2019.

Bullard now features on YouTube as a member of former Soccer AM presenter Peter Dales' channel: "Golf Life," as well as hosting his own podcast with John Fendley called FCBullard.

In 2026, he was one of the 'All Stars' contestants in series 2 of I'm a Celebrity... South Africa, first aired on ITV on 6 April 2026, and caused a lot of drama during the series and the live final broadcast on April 24th.

== Personal life ==
As of 2014, Bullard was engaged to his long-term girlfriend and had two children.

His son, Archie, currently races single-seaters and is competing in the 2026 GB4 Championship with Fox Motorsport.

== Career statistics ==
Appearances and goals by club, season and competition
Club	Season	League			FA Cup		League Cup		Other		Total	
Club	Season	Division	Apps	Goals	Apps	Goals	Apps	Goals	Apps	Goals	Apps	Goals
West Ham United	1998–99	Premier League	0	0	0	0	0	0	—		0	0
West Ham United	1999–00	Premier League	0	0	0	0	0	0	0	0	0	0
West Ham United	2000–01	Premier League	0	0	0	0	0	0	—		0	0
West Ham United	Total		0	0	0	0	0	0	0	0	0	0
Peterborough United	2001–02	Second Division	40	8	5	1	1	0	2 (Note: Appearance(s) in Football League Trophy)	2	48	11
Peterborough United	2002–03	Second Division	26	3	1	0	1	0	1	0	29	4
Peterborough United	Total		66	11	6	1	2	0	3	2	77	15
Wigan Athletic	2002–03	Second Division	17	1	0	0	0	0	—		17	1
Wigan Athletic	2003–04	First Division	46	2	1	0	3	1	—		50	3
Wigan Athletic	2004–05	Championship	46	3	1	0	1	0	—		48	3
Wigan Athletic	2005–06	Premier League	36	4	2	0	4	0	—		42	4
Wigan Athletic	Total		145	10	4	0	8	1	0	0	157	11
Fulham	2006–07	Premier League	4	2	0	0	0	0	—		4	2
Fulham	2007–08	Premier League	17	2	1	0	0	0	—		18	2
Fulham	2008–09	Premier League	18	2	0	0	1	1	—		19	3
Fulham	Total		39	6	1	0	1	1	0	0	41	7
Hull City	2008–09	Premier League	1	0	0	0	0	0	—		1	0
Hull City	2009–10	Premier League	14	4	0	0	0	0	—		14	4
Hull City	2010–11	Championship	8	2	1	0	0	0	—		9	2
Hull City	Total		23	6	1	0	0	0	0	0	24	6
Ipswich Town	2010–11	Championship	16	5	0	0	0	0	—		16	5
Ipswich Town	2011–12	Championship	21	1	0	0	0	0	—		21	1
Ipswich Town	Total		37	6	0	0	0	0	0	0	37	6
Milton Keynes Dons	2012–13	League One	2	0	0	0	0	0	1	0	3	0
Career total			312	39	12	1	11	2	4	2	339	44

== Honours ==
Wigan Athletic

- Football League Second Division: 2002–03
- Football League Championship runner-up: 2004–05
- Football League Cup runner-up: 2005–06

Individual

- PFA Team of the Year: 2002–03 Second Division, 2004–05 Championship
- Premier League Player of the Month: November 2009
- Ipswich Town Player of the Year: 2010–11

== Filmography ==
Year	Title	Role	Notes
2014	I'm a Celebrity...Get Me Out of Here!	Himself	
2014	Text Santa	Himself	Guest appearance
2015	Celebrity Big Brother	Himself	Guest panellist; 2 episodes
2015	Reality Bites	Himself	Guest panellist; 1 episode
2015	Big Star's Little Star	Himself	Celebrity contestant; 1 episode
2015	The Magic Sponge	Himself	
2015	Play to the Whistle	Himself	Host's assistant; 7 episodes
2015	Virtually Famous	Himself	Guest Panellist; 1 episode
2016	Celebrity Juice	Himself	Guest Panellist; 1 episode
2017 – 2023	Soccer AM	Himself	Co-Host
2017	Tipping Point: Lucky Stars	Himself	Contestant; 1 episode
2026	Im A Celebrity South Africa	Himself	
