= John Fendley =

British television presenter

- Born: 16 September 1969 (age 57); Scarborough, North Riding of Yorkshire, England
- Occupations: Television presenter & producer
- Years active: 1990s–present
- Known for: Soccer AM

John "Fenners" Fendley is a British television presenter, best known for being a co-host of Sky Sports' Soccer AM between 2015 and 2023.

== Career ==
Between 1997 and 2007, Fendley was a producer on Soccer AM. Upon leaving the show, Fendley began working for internet television channel ChannelBee in 2008.

In 2010, he was an occasional 'feature reporter' on Sky Sports News show Soccer Saturday. From 2010–2012, Fendley presented Take It Like a Fan alongside Charlotte Jackson and then Bianca Westwood.

In August 2015, Fendley was named as a co-presenter of Soccer AM alongside Helen Chamberlain, replacing Max Rushden. Fendley also co-presented Sky TV's The Fantasy Football Club alongside Paul Merson in 2018. From June 2019 until May 2023, Fendley presented Soccer AM alongside Jimmy Bullard.

After Soccer AM finished airing in May 2023, Fendley spoke to media saying how the show being axed had affected his mental health. In April 2024, it was announced he had launched a podcast alongside his former Soccer AM co-host Jimmy Bullard called FC Bullard.

== Personal life ==
Fendley attended East Ayton Primary School and Raincliffe School in Scarborough. After leaving Scarborough Sixth Form College, Fendley had a gap year in Australia.
