= 2010–11 Ipswich Town F.C. season =

Ipswich Town
2010–11 season
- Chairman: Marcus Evans
- Manager: Roy Keane (until 7 January 2011); Ian McParland (caretaker) (7-12 January 2011); Paul Jewell (from 13 January 2011)
- Stadium: Portman Road
- Championship: 13th
- FA Cup: Third round
- League Cup: Semi-finals
- Top goalscorer: League: Jason Scotland (10); All: David Norris (11)
- Highest home attendance: 29,258 (vs. Norwich City, 21 April 2011, Championship)
- Lowest home attendance: 11,363 (vs. West Bromwich Albion, 1 December 2010, League Cup)
- Average home league attendance: 19,615
Home colours	Away colours	Third colours

The 2010–11 season is Ipswich Town's ninth consecutive season in The Football League Championship, the second-highest division in the English football league system. In addition to competing in The Championship, Ipswich Town are also competing in the League Cup and the FA Cup. Manager Roy Keane was sacked after the defeat to Nottingham Forest in January after a season-and-a-half in charge. First-team coach Ian McParland presided over the FA Cup defeat at Chelsea and the League Cup semi-final 1st leg win over Arsenal before Paul Jewell took over the managerial role on a permanent basis.

== First-team squad ==
Note: Flags indicate national team as defined under FIFA eligibility rules; some limited exceptions apply. Players may hold more than one non-FIFA nationality.

No.	Pos.	Nation	Player
1	GK	IRL	Brian Murphy
2	DF	CAN	Jaime Peters
3	DF	IRL	Shane O'Connor
4	DF	NIR	Gareth McAuley
5	DF	IRL	Damien Delaney
6	MF	ENG	Grant Leadbitter
7	MF	TTO	Carlos Edwards
8	MF	ENG	David Norris (captain)
9	FW	ENG	Connor Wickham
10	FW	TTO	Jason Scotland
11	MF	ENG	Lee Martin
12	GK	ENG	Arran Lee-Barrett

No.	Pos.	Nation	Player
14	MF	ENG	Jimmy Bullard (on loan from Hull City)
15	MF	IRL	Alan Quinn
16	FW	HUN	Tamás Priskin
17	MF	ENG	Andy Drury
19	MF	ENG	Luke Hyam
21	GK	HUN	Márton Fülöp
22	DF	WAL	Troy Brown
23	DF	ENG	Tom Eastman
24	MF	IRL	Colin Healy
26	MF	ARG	Luciano Civelli
39	DF	IRL	Mark Kennedy
42	MF	NIR	Josh Carson

=== Left club during season ===
Note: Flags indicate national team as defined under FIFA eligibility rules; some limited exceptions apply. Players may hold more than one non-FIFA nationality.

No.	Pos.	Nation	Player
10	FW	IRL	Jonathan Walters (to Stoke City)
13	GK	IRL	Ian McLoughlin (on loan to Stockport County)
14	FW	ENG	Jon Stead (to Bristol City)
14	MF	ENG	Jake Livermore (loan return to Tottenham Hotspur)
17	MF	ENG	Andros Townsend (loan return to Tottenham Hotspur)
18	FW	ESP	Pablo Couñago (on loan to Crystal Palace)
20	DF	NZL	Tommy Smith (on loan to Colchester United)

No.	Pos.	Nation	Player
28	FW	IRL	Ronan Murray (on loan to Torquay United)
30	MF	ENG	Kieron Dyer (loan return to West Ham United)
33	FW	JAM	Kevin Lisbie (on loan to Colchester United)
35	DF	NED	Gianni Zuiverloon (loan return to West Bromwich Albion)
36	MF	ENG	Jack Colback (loan return to Sunderland)
37	FW	NZL	Rory Fallon (loan return to Plymouth Argyle)
48	DF	IRL	Darren O'Dea (loan return to Celtic)

=== Under-23 squad ===
Note: Flags indicate national team as defined under FIFA eligibility rules; some limited exceptions apply. Players may hold more than one non-FIFA nationality.

No.	Pos.	Nation	Player
25	MF	ENG	Billy Clark
27	MF	BER	Reggie Lambe
29	DF	ENG	Jack Ainsley

No.	Pos.	Nation	Player
31	MF	IRL	David Cawley
32	MF	ENG	Jamie Griffiths
34	MF	IRL	Conor Hourihane

== First-team coaching staff ==
Until 7 January:

Position	Name
Manager	(Republic of Ireland) Roy Keane
Assistant manager	(England) Tony Loughlan
Assistant manager	(Scotland) Ian McParland
First-team Coach	(England) Gary Albett
Goalkeeping coach	(England) James Hollman
Fitness Coach	(Spain) Antonio Gomez
Fitness Coach	(England) Simon Thadani
Head physiotherapist	(England) Matt Byard

From 13 January:

Position	Name
Manager	(England) Paul Jewell
Assistant manager	(England) Chris Hutchings
Assistant manager	(Wales) Sean McCarthy
Goalkeeping coach	(England) James Hollman
Fitness Coach	(Spain) Antonio Gomez
Fitness Coach	(England) Simon Thadani
Head physiotherapist	(England) Matt Byard

== Pre-season ==
6 July 2010 Friendly	Newmarket Town	1–9	Ipswich Town	Newmarket, Suffolk
19:45 BST	Olive	(report)	Martin; Garvan; Leadbitter; Couñago; Healy; Quinn	Stadium: Cricket Field Road; Attendance: ~1,000

9 July 2010 Friendly	Histon	0–6	Ipswich Town	Impington, Cambridgeshire
19:45 BST		(report)	Norris; Wickham; McAuley; Martin; Jon Stead	Stadium: Bridge Road

12 July 2010 Friendly	Hadleigh United	1–3	Ipswich Town XI	Hadleigh, Suffolk
19:45 BST	Dennett	(report)	Cawley; Brandon; Lavery	Stadium: Millfield

17 July 2010 Friendly	PSV Eindhoven	1–0	Ipswich Town	Eindhoven, North Brabant
15:00 CEST	Koevermans	(report)		Stadium: Philips Stadion

18 July 2010 Friendly	Great Yarmouth Town	1–4	Ipswich Town XI	Great Yarmouth, Norfolk
15:00 BST	Roach	(report)	Eastman; Quinn	Stadium: Wellesley Recreation Ground

27 July 2010 Friendly	Leiston	0–2	Ipswich Town XI	Leiston, Suffolk
19:45 BST		(report)	Murray; Cawley	Stadium: Victory Road

28 July 2010 Friendly	Bury Town	0–1	Ipswich Town	Bury St Edmunds, Suffolk
19:45 BST		(report)	McAuley	Stadium: Ram Meadow

31 July 2010 Friendly	Ipswich Town	0–1	West Ham United	Ipswich, Suffolk
15:00 BST		(report)	Cole	Stadium: Portman Road; Attendance: 10,564

3 August 2010 Friendly	Ipswich Town XI	0–1	Tottenham Hotspur XI	Ipswich, Suffolk
19:45 BST		(report)	Pavlyuchenko	Stadium: Portman Road; Attendance: 5,770

== Competitions ==
=== Football League Championship ===
==== League table ====
Pos	Team	Pld	W	D	L	GF	GA	GD	Pts
11	Hull City	46	16	17	13	52	51	+1	65
12	Middlesbrough	46	17	11	18	68	68	0	62
13	Ipswich Town	46	18	8	20	62	68	−6	62
14	Watford	46	16	13	17	77	71	+6	61
15	Bristol City	46	17	9	20	62	65	−3	60

Updated to match(es) played on 7 May 2011. Source: The Football League
Rules for classification: 1) points; 2) goal difference; 3) number of goals scored.

==== Results summary ====
Overall								Home						Away					
Pld	W	D	L	GF	GA	GD	Pts	W	D	L	GF	GA	GD	W	D	L	GF	GA	GD
46	18	8	20	62	68	−6	62	10	3	10	33	37	−4	8	5	10	29	31	−2

Source: Table

==== Results by round ====
Round	1	2	3	4	5	6	7	8	9	10	11	12	13	14	15	16	17	18	19	20	21	22	23	24	25	26	27	28	29	30	31	32	33	34	35	36	37	38	39	40	41	42	43	44	45	46
Ground	A	H	A	H	A	H	H	A	A	H	H	A	A	H	A	H	H	A	A	H	A	H	A	H	A	H	A	H	A	A	H	A	H	A	H	A	H	H	A	H	H	A	H	A	H	A
Result	W	D	W	W	D	L	W	D	L	W	L	L	L	W	W	L	L	L	L	L	L	W	D	L	L	W	W	W	D	W	D	L	L	W	L	D	L	W	W	W	D	W	L	L	W	L
Position	3	4	5	3	3	5	2	4	7	5	6	8	14	10	6	7	12	13	16	17	18	17	19	19	20	19	17	14	15	13	13	13	14	14	16	15	16	15	13	13	13	12	12	13	12	13

Source: Fixtures Table
A = Away; H = Home; W = Win; D = Draw; L = Loss

==== August ====
Win Draw Loss Void Upcoming fixture

7 August 2010 1	Middlesbrough	1–3	Ipswich Town	Middlesbrough, North Yorkshire
15:00 BST	McDonald 22'	Report	Smith 50'; Priskin 51'; Stead 77'	Stadium: Riverside Stadium; Attendance: 21,882; Referee: Bates

14 August 2010 2	Ipswich Town	1–1	Burnley	Ipswich, Suffolk
15:00 BST	Norris 86'	Report	Edgar (red card) 79'; Carlisle 90+2'	Stadium: Portman Road; Attendance: 19,317; Referee: Hegley

21 August 2010 3	Crystal Palace	1–2	Ipswich Town	Croydon, Greater London
15:00 BST	Davis (red card) 50'; Danns 90+3'	Report	Leadbitter 51' (pen.); Edwards 56'; Townsend (red card) 73'	Stadium: Selhurst Park; Attendance: 15,781; Referee: Moss

28 August 2010 4	Ipswich Town	2–0	Bristol City	Ipswich, Suffolk
15:00 BST	Priskin 59'; Scotland 74'	Report		Stadium: Portman Road; Attendance: 19,011; Referee: Russell

==== September ====
11 September 2010 5	Portsmouth	0–0	Ipswich Town	Portsmouth, Hampshire
15:00 BST		Report		Stadium: Fratton Park; Attendance: 15,445; Referee: Tanner

14 September 2010 6	Ipswich Town	0–3	Queens Park Rangers	Ipswich, Suffolk
19:45 BST		Report	Mackie 31', 42'; Helguson 68' (pen.)	Stadium: Portman Road; Attendance: 19,931; Referee: Stroud

18 September 2010 7	Ipswich Town	2–0	Cardiff City	Ipswich, Suffolk
15:00 BST	Matthews 62' (o.g.); Scotland 74'	Report		Stadium: Portman Road; Attendance: 22,599; Referee: Graham

25 September 2010 8	Scunthorpe United	1–1	Ipswich Town	Scunthorpe, Lincolnshire
15:00 BST	Mirfin 30'	Report	Peters 57'	Stadium: Glanford Park; Attendance: 5,931; Referee: Haywood

28 September 2010 9	Reading	1–0	Ipswich Town	Reading, Berkshire
20:00 BST	Mills (red card) 59'; Church 88'	Report	Hyam (red card) 52'	Stadium: Madejski Stadium; Attendance: 15,763; Referee: Crossley

==== October ====
2 October 2010 10	Ipswich Town	2–1	Leeds United	Ipswich, Suffolk
15:00 BST	Scotland 19'; Smith 83'	Report	Snodgrass 77'; Bruce (red card) 79'	Stadium: Portman Road; Attendance: 23,105; Referee: Hill

16 October 2010 11	Ipswich Town	1–2	Coventry City	Ipswich, Suffolk
15:00 BST	Scotland 58'	Report	Platt 19'; Jutkiewicz 56' (pen.)	Stadium: Portman Road; Attendance: 19,100 (529 visitors); Referee: Shoebridge

19 October 2010 12	Watford	2–1	Ipswich Town	Watford, Hertfordshire
19:45 BST	McGinn 41'; Sordell 43'	Report	Norris 69'	Stadium: Vicarage Road; Attendance: 11,836; Referee: Scott

23 October 2010 13	Nottingham Forest	2–0	Ipswich Town	Nottingham, Nottinghamshire
15:00 BST	McGoldrick 13'; McGugan 45'	Report	Leadbitter (yellow card) 44'	Stadium: City Ground; Attendance: 22,935; Referee: Andy Woolmer

30 October 2010 14	Ipswich Town	2–0	Millwall	Ipswich, Suffolk
15:00 BST	Scotland 5'; Leadbitter 56'		Dunne (yellow card) 89'	Stadium: Portman Road; Attendance: 19,020; Referee: Kevin Friend

==== November ====
6 November 2010 15	Sheffield United	1–2	Ipswich Town	Sheffield, South Yorkshire
15:00 GMT	Quinn 29'	Report	Priskin 6'; McAuley 40'	Stadium: Bramall Lane; Attendance: 19,207; Referee: Salisbury

9 November 2010 16	Ipswich Town	0–2	Derby County	Ipswich, Suffolk
19:45 GMT		Report	Commons 58', 76'	Stadium: Portman Road; Attendance: 17,572; Referee: East

13 November 2010 17	Ipswich Town	1–3	Barnsley	Ipswich, Suffolk
15:00 GMT	Smith 80'	Report	Lovre 21'; Fülöp 27' (o.g.); O'Connor 50'	Stadium: Portman Road; Attendance: 18,024; Referee: Tierney

20 November 2010 18	Hull City	1–0	Ipswich Town	Kingston upon Hull, East Riding of Yorkshire
15:00 GMT	Koren 77'	Report		Stadium: KC Stadium; Attendance: 20,535; Referee: Haines

28 November 2010 19	Norwich City	4–1	Ipswich Town	Norwich, Norfolk
13:15 GMT	Holt 13', 35', 76'; Hoolahan 78'	Report	Delaney 29' (red card) 37'	Stadium: Carrow Road; Attendance: 26,532; Referee: Hill

==== December ====
4 December 2010 20	Ipswich Town	1–3	Swansea City	Ipswich, Suffolk
12:45 GMT	O'Dea (yellow card) 41'; Townsend 51'	Report	Rangel (yellow card) 60'; Beattie 64', 86'; Allen 70'	Stadium: Portman Road; Attendance: 16,978; Referee: Andy D'Urso

11 December 2010 21	Preston North End	1–0	Ipswich Town	Preston, Lancashire
15:00 GMT	Hume 50'; Barton (yellow card) 81'; Lonergan (yellow card) 90+1'	Report		Stadium: Deepdale; Attendance: 9,419; Referee: Ilderton

18 December 2010 22	Ipswich Town	3–0	Leicester City	Ipswich, Suffolk
17:20 GMT	Fallon (yellow card) 3'; Norris 6'; Scotland 27', 39'	Report	Davies (yellow card) 31'	Stadium: Portman Road; Attendance: 16,728; Referee: Attwell

26 December 2010	Ipswich Town	P–P	Watford	Ipswich, Suffolk
Postponed		Report		Stadium: Portman Road

28 December 2010	Doncaster Rovers	P–P	Ipswich Town	Doncaster, South Yorkshire
Postponed		Report		Stadium: Keepmoat Stadium

==== January ====
1 January 2011 23	Coventry City	1–1	Ipswich Town	Coventry, West Midlands
15:00 GMT	Eastwood 48'; King (red card) 59'	Report	Fallon 44'; Scotland (yellow card) 62'	Stadium: Ricoh Arena; Attendance: 14,412; Referee: Booth

3 January 2011 24	Ipswich Town	0–1	Nottingham Forest	Ipswich, Suffolk
15:00 GMT	Norris (yellow card) 35'; Leadbitter (red card) 90+5'	Report	Camp (yellow card) 31'; Delaney 45+2' (o.g.); Ramsey (yellow card) 66'	Stadium: Portman Road; Attendance: 19,455; Referee: Sheldrake

15 January 2011 25	Millwall	2–1	Ipswich Town	Lewisham, Greater London
15:00 GMT	Schofield 45'; Morison 76'	Report	Priskin 25'	Stadium: The Den; Attendance: 12,111; Referee: Williamson

22 January 2011 26	Ipswich Town	3–2	Doncaster Rovers	Ipswich, Suffolk
15:00 GMT	Norris 48'; Wickham 60'; Edwards 64'	Report	Sharp 6' 61'	Stadium: Portman Road; Attendance: 17,298; Referee: Brown

==== February ====
1 February 2011 27	Derby County	1–2	Ipswich Town	Derby, Derbyshire
19:45 GMT	Bueno 7'; Barker (yellow card) 70'	Report	Bullard 28'; Norris 68'; Edwards (yellow card) 86'	Stadium: Pride Park; Attendance: 23,159; Referee: Boyeson

5 February 2011 28	Ipswich Town	3–0	Sheffield United	Ipswich, Suffolk
15:00 GMT	Delaney 29'; Norris 53'; Wickham 87'	Report	Doyle (yellow card) 33'; Lowry (yellow card) 71'; Williamson (red card) 89'; Kozluk (red card) 88'	Stadium: Portman Road; Attendance: 18,280; Referee: Phillips

12 February 2011 29	Barnsley	1–1	Ipswich Town	Barnsley, South Yorkshire
15:00 GMT	Mellis 90'	Report	Scotland 82'	Stadium: Oakwell; Attendance: 10,904; Referee: Drysdale

15 February 2011 30	Doncaster Rovers	0–6	Ipswich Town	Doncaster, South Yorkshire
19:45 GMT		Report	Hird 25' (o.g.); Healy 33'; Wickham 42', 61', 90' (pen.); McAuley 65'	Stadium: Keepmoat Stadium; Attendance: 8,448; Referee: Halsey

19 February 2011 31	Ipswich Town	1–1	Hull City	Ipswich, Suffolk
15:00 GMT	Scotland 58'; Leadbitter (yellow card) 33'	Report	Simpson 85'	Stadium: Portman Road; Attendance: 19,135; Referee: Pawson

22 February 2011 32	Queens Park Rangers	2–0	Ipswich Town	Hammersmith & Fulham, Greater London
20:00 GMT	Hill 77'; Helguson 83'	Report	Kennedy (yellow card) 58'	Stadium: Loftus Road; Attendance: 16,587; Referee: Wright

26 February 2011 33	Ipswich Town	0–2	Portsmouth	Ipswich, Suffolk
15:00 GMT		Report	Rocha (yellow card) 20'; Nugent 55'; Cotterill 77'	Stadium: Portman Road; Attendance: 23,345; Referee: Mathieson

==== March ====
5 March 2011 34	Cardiff City	0–2	Ipswich Town	Cardiff, South Glamorgan
17:20 GMT		Report	Bullard 67', 86'; Martin (yellow card) 77'	Stadium: Cardiff City Stadium; Attendance: 21,347; Referee: Bates

8 March 2011 35	Ipswich Town	1–3	Reading	Ipswich, Suffolk
19:45 GMT	Norris (yellow card) 90+2'; Wickham 90+3'	Report	Long 18'; Hunt (yellow card) 19' (goal) 89'; Robson-Kanu (yellow card) 77'; Harte 86'	Stadium: Portman Road; Attendance: 17,308; Referee: McDermid

12 March 2011 36	Leeds United	0–0	Ipswich Town	Leeds, West Yorkshire
15:00 GMT	Paynter (yellow card) 4'; O'Brien (yellow card) 28'	Report	McAuley (yellow card) 60'; Wickham (yellow card) 90+2'	Stadium: Elland Road; Attendance: 27,432; Referee: Deadman

15 March 2011 37	Ipswich Town	0–3	Watford	Ipswich, Suffolk
19:45 GMT		Report	Graham 3', 61'; Eustace (yellow card) 15'; Thompson (yellow card) 45+2'; Cowie 90+1'	Stadium: Portman Road; Attendance: 17,789; Referee: Hegley

19 March 2011 38	Ipswich Town	2–0	Scunthorpe United	Ipswich, Suffolk
15:00 GMT	Leadbitter (yellow card) 11'; Edwards 26'; Martin (yellow card) 49'; Bullard 53'; McAuley (yellow card) 72'	Report	O'Connor (yellow card) 52'	Stadium: Portman Road; Attendance: 17,787; Referee: Webb

==== April ====
2 April 2011 39	Burnley	1–2	Ipswich Town	Burnley, Lancashire
15:00 BST	Rodriguez 68'	Report	Norris 17'; Wickham 24'	Stadium: Turf Moor; Attendance: 14,483; Referee: Kettle

9 April 2011 40	Ipswich Town	2–1	Crystal Palace	Ipswich, Suffolk
15:00 BST	Carson 38', 66'	Report	McCarthy 73'	Stadium: Portman Road; Attendance: 24,378; Referee: Salisbury

12 April 2011 41	Ipswich Town	3–3	Middlesbrough	Ipswich, Suffolk
19:45 BST	Leadbitter 6', 76' (pen.); Wickham 64'	Report	Halliday 42'; McDonald 43'; Taylor 51'	Stadium: Portman Road; Attendance: 17,286; Referee: Russell

16 April 2011 42	Bristol City	0–1	Ipswich Town	Bristol
15:00 BST		Report	Martin (red card) 28'; Carson 52'	Stadium: Ashton Gate; Attendance: 14,159; Referee: Booth

21 April 2011 43	Ipswich Town	1–5	Norwich City	Ipswich, Suffolk
19:45 BST	Bullard 78'	Report	Surman 13'; McAuley 24' (o.g.); Jackson 73'; Martin 80'; Pacheco 90+4'	Stadium: Portman Road; Attendance: 29,258; Referee: Moss

25 April 2011 44	Swansea City	4–1	Ipswich Town	Swansea, West Glamorgan
15:00 BST	Borini 9', 30'; Moore 14'; Sinclair 71' (pen.)	Report	Healy 20'	Stadium: Liberty Stadium; Attendance: 16,001; Referee: Linington

30 April 2011 45	Ipswich Town	2–1	Preston North End	Ipswich, Suffolk
15:00 BST	Scotland 10'; Norris 19'	Report	Coutts 52'	Stadium: Portman Road; Attendance: 18,431; Referee: Wright

==== May ====
8 May 2011 46	Leicester City	4–2	Ipswich Town	Leicester, Leicestershire
15:00 BST	King 26'; Yakubu 42'; Abe 45+2'; Kamara 72'	Report	Leadbitter 69' (pen.); Wickham 70'	Stadium: Walkers Stadium; Attendance: 24,859; Referee: Carl Boyeson

=== FA Cup ===
9 January 2011 Third round	Chelsea	7–0	Ipswich Town	Hammersmith & Fulham, Greater London
15:00 GMT	Kalou 33'; Sturridge 33', 52'; Edwards 41' (o.g.); Anelka 49'; Lampard 78', 79'	Report		Stadium: Stamford Bridge; Attendance: 41,654; Referee: Andy D'Urso

=== Football League Cup ===
Ipswich Town reached the semi-final of the League Cup for the first time in 10 years.

10 August 2010 First round	Exeter City	2–3 (a.e.t.)	Ipswich Town	Exeter, Devon
19:45 BST	Harley 54', 81'	Report	Murray 63'; Norris 73', 99'	Stadium: St James Park; Attendance: 4,520; Referee: Shoebridge

24 August 2010 Second round	Crewe Alexandra	0–1 (a.e.t.)	Ipswich Town	Crewe, Cheshire
19:45 BST		Report	Norris 101'	Stadium: Alexandra Stadium; Attendance: 3,309; Referee: Tierney

21 September 2010 Third round	Millwall	1–2	Ipswich Town	Southwark, Greater London
19:45 BST	Morison 62'	Report	Priskin 23'; McAuley 45+3'	Stadium: The Den; Attendance: 5,070; Referee: D'Urso

26 October 2010 Fourth round	Ipswich Town	3–1	Northampton Town	Ipswich, Suffolk
19:45 BST	Edwards 26'; Delaney 44'; Priskin 88'	Report	Davis 16'	Stadium: Portman Road; Attendance: 12,929; Referee: Ilderton

1 December 2010 Fifth round	Ipswich Town	1–0	West Bromwich Albion	Ipswich, Suffolk
19:45 GMT	Leadbitter 69' (pen.)	Report		Stadium: Portman Road; Attendance: 11,363; Referee: Jones

12 January 2011 Semi-finals; First leg	Ipswich Town	1–0	Arsenal	Ipswich, Suffolk
19:45 GMT	Priskin 78'	Report		Stadium: Portman Road; Attendance: 29,146; Referee: Martin Atkinson

25 January 2011 Semi-finals; Second leg	Arsenal	3–0 (3–1 agg.)	Ipswich Town	Islington, Greater London
19:45 GMT	Bendtner 61'; Koscielny 64'; Fàbregas 77'	Report		Stadium: Emirates Stadium; Attendance: 59,387; Referee: Mark Halsey

== Transfers ==
=== Transfers in ===
Date	Position	Nationality	Name	From	Fee	Ref.
16 July 2010	CM	(Republic of Ireland)	Conor Hourihane	(England) Sunderland	Free transfer	
28 July 2010	LB	(Republic of Ireland)	Mark Kennedy	(Wales) Cardiff City	£75,000	
2 August 2010	GK	(Hungary)	Márton Fülöp	(England) Sunderland	£750,000	
23 August 2010	CF	(Trinidad and Tobago)	Jason Scotland	(England) Wigan Athletic	£750,000	
31 January 2010	LW	(England)	Andy Drury	(England) Luton Town	£150,000	

- Total spending: ▼£1.65 million+

=== Loans in ===
Date from	Position	Nationality	Name	From	Date until	Ref.
12 August 2010	RW	(England)	Andros Townsend	(England) Tottenham Hotspur	22 December 2010	
17 August 2010	CB	(Republic of Ireland)	Darren O'Dea	(Scotland) Celtic	17 January 2011	
23 September 2010	CM	(England)	Jake Livermore	(England) Tottenham Hotspur	5 January 2011	
15 October 2010	DM	(England)	Jack Colback	(England) Sunderland	6 January 2011	
23 November 2010	CF	(New Zealand)	Rory Fallon	(England) Plymouth Argyle	16 January 2011	
25 November 2010	RB	(Netherlands)	Gianni Zuiverloon	(England) West Bromwich Albion	27 December 2010	
27 January 2011	CM	(England)	Jimmy Bullard	(England) Hull City	30 June 2011	
11 March 2011	CM	(England)	Kieron Dyer	(England) West Ham United	11 April 2011	

=== Transfers out ===
Date	Position	Nationality	Name	To	Fee	Ref.
24 June 2010	CM	(England)	Liam Trotter	(England) Millwall	Undisclosed	
30 June 2010	GK	(England)	Richard Wright	Free agent	Released	
30 June 2010	RB	(England)	David Wright	(England) Crystal Palace	Free transfer	
30 June 2010	CB	(Netherlands)	Pim Balkestein	(England) Brentford	Free transfer	
30 June 2010	LW	(United States)	Devann Yao	Free agent	Released	
2 July 2010	CM	(England)	Ed Upson	(England) Yeovil Town	Free transfer	
30 July 2010	CB	(Republic of Ireland)	Alex Bruce	(England) Leeds United	£225,000	
3 August 2010	CM	(Republic of Ireland)	Owen Garvan	(England) Crystal Palace	£225,000	
18 August 2010	CF	(Republic of Ireland)	Jonathan Walters	(England) Stoke City	£2,750,000	
23 August 2010	CF	(England)	Jon Stead	(England) Bristol City	£225,000	
1 March 2011	LB	(England)	Seb Dunbar	(England) Maldon & Tiptree	Free transfer	

- Total income: ▲£3.4 million+

=== Loans out ===
Date from	Position	Nationality	Name	To	Date until	Ref.
28 July 2010	CF	(Jamaica)	Kevin Lisbie	(England) Millwall	30 June 2011	
6 August 2010	AM	(England)	Lee Martin	(England) Charlton Athletic	30 June 2011	
20 August 2010	CF	(Spain)	Pablo Couñago	(England) Crystal Palace	30 June 2011	
29 October 2010	GK	(Republic of Ireland)	Ian McLoughlin	(England) Lowestoft Town	29 November 2010	
19 November 2010	RB	(England)	Jack Ainsley	(England) Histon	19 December 2010	
25 February 2011	GK	(Republic of Ireland)	Ian McLoughlin	(England) Stockport County	30 June 2011	
9 March 2011	CF	(Republic of Ireland)	Ronan Murray	(England) Torquay United	30 June 2011	
17 March 2011	CB	(New Zealand)	Tommy Smith	(England) Colchester United	30 June 2011	
24 March 2011	RM	(Bermuda)	Reggie Lambe	(England) Bristol Rovers	30 June 2011	
24 March 2011	CF	(Hungary)	Tamás Priskin	(Wales) Swansea City	30 June 2011	

== Squad statistics ==
All statistics updated as of end of season

=== Appearances and goals ===
No.	Pos	Nat	Player	Total		Championship		FA Cup		League Cup	
No.	Pos	Nat	Player	Apps	Goals	Apps	Goals	Apps	Goals	Apps	Goals
Goalkeepers
1	GK	(Republic of Ireland) IRL	Brian Murphy	9	0	4	0	0	0	5	0
12	GK	(England) ENG	Arran Lee-Barrett	7	0	7	0	0	0	0	0
21	GK	(Hungary) HUN	Márton Fülöp	38	0	35	0	1	0	2	0
Defenders
2	DF	(Canada) CAN	Jamie Peters	30	1	12+11	1	1	0	3+3	0
3	DF	(Republic of Ireland) IRL	Shane O'Connor	9	0	2+3	0	0	0	2+2	0
4	DF	(Northern Ireland) NIR	Gareth McAuley	45	3	39	2	1	0	5	1
5	DF	(Republic of Ireland) IRL	Damien Delaney	36	3	32	2	0	0	4	1
22	DF	(Wales) WAL	Troy Brown	16	0	6+6	0	1	0	3	0
23	DF	(England) ENG	Tom Eastman	12	0	8+1	0	0	0	3	0
29	DF	(England) ENG	Jack Ainsley	2	0	0+1	0	0	0	1	0
39	DF	(Republic of Ireland) IRL	Mark Kennedy	30	0	24+2	0	1	0	3	0
Midfielders
6	MF	(England) ENG	Grant Leadbitter	50	6	44	5	0	0	5+1	1
7	MF	(Trinidad and Tobago) TTO	Carlos Edwards	51	4	42+3	3	1	0	4+1	1
8	MF	(England) ENG	David Norris	43	11	35+1	8	1	0	6	3
11	MF	(England) ENG	Lee Martin	16	0	15+1	0	0	0	0	0
14	MF	(England) ENG	Jimmy Bullard	16	5	16	5	0	0	0	0
17	MF	(England) ENG	Andy Drury	12	0	4+8	0	0	0	0	0
19	MF	(England) ENG	Luke Hyam	13	0	8+2	0	0	0	3	0
24	MF	(Republic of Ireland) IRL	Colin Healy	22	2	7+9	2	1	0	4+1	0
26	MF	(Argentina) ARG	Luciano Civelli	9	0	0+9	0	0	0	0	0
27	MF	(Bermuda) BER	Reggie Lambe	5	0	0+2	0	0	0	3	0
32	MF	(England) ENG	Jamie Griffiths	1	0	0	0	0	0	0+1	0
42	MF	(Northern Ireland) NIR	Josh Carson	9	3	8+1	3	0	0	0	0
Forwards
9	FW	(England) ENG	Connor Wickham	41	9	24+13	9	1	0	2+1	0
10	FW	(Trinidad and Tobago) TTO	Jason Scotland	45	10	32+7	10	1	0	2+3	0
16	FW	(Hungary) HUN	Tamás Priskin	39	7	18+14	4	0+1	0	6	3
Players transferred out during the season
10	FW	(Republic of Ireland) IRL	Jonathan Walters	1	0	1	0	0	0	0	0
14	FW	(England) ENG	Jon Stead	4	1	2+1	1	0	0	1	0
28	FW	(Republic of Ireland) IRL	Ronan Murray	13	1	1+7	0	0+1	0	0+4	1
20	DF	(New Zealand) NZL	Tommy Smith	26	3	22	3	0	0	3+1	0
Loan players returning to parent clubs during the season
14	MF	(England) ENG	Jake Livermore	12	0	8+4	0	0	0	0	0
17	MF	(England) ENG	Andros Townsend	16	1	11+2	1	0	0	3	0
30	MF	(England) ENG	Kieron Dyer	4	0	1+3	0	0	0	0	0
35	DF	(Netherlands) NED	Gianni Zuiverloon	4	0	4	0	0	0	0	0
36	MF	(England) ENG	Jack Colback	13	0	13	0	0	0	0	0
37	FW	(Australia) AUS	Rory Fallon	6	1	4+2	1	0	0	0	0
48	DF	(Republic of Ireland) IRL	Darren O'Dea	25	0	17+3	0	1	0	4	0

Last updated: end of season
Source: Competitions

=== Goalscorers ===
No.	Pos	Nat	Player	Championship	FA Cup	League Cup	Total
8	MF	(England)	David Norris	8	0	3	11
10	FW	(Trinidad and Tobago)	Jason Scotland	10	0	0	10
9	FW	(England)	Connor Wickham	9	0	0	9
16	FW	(Hungary)	Tamás Priskin	4	0	3	7
6	MF	(England)	Grant Leadbitter	5	0	1	6
14	MF	(England)	Jimmy Bullard	5	0	0	5
7	MF	(Trinidad and Tobago)	Carlos Edwards	3	0	1	4
4	DF	(Northern Ireland)	Gareth McAuley	2	0	1	3
5	DF	(Republic of Ireland)	Damien Delaney	2	0	1	3
29	DF	(New Zealand)	Tommy Smith	3	0	0	3
42	MF	(Northern Ireland)	Josh Carson	3	0	0	3
24	MF	(Republic of Ireland)	Colin Healy	2	0	0	2
2	DF	(Canada)	Jamie Peters	1	0	0	1
17	MF	(England)	Andros Townsend	1	0	0	1
28	FW	(Republic of Ireland)	Ronan Murray	0	0	1	1
14	FW	(England)	Jon Stead	1	0	0	1
37	FW	(Australia)	Rory Fallon	1	0	0	1
Own goal				2	0	0	2
Total				62	0	11	73

=== Clean sheets ===
No.	Nat	Player	Championship	FA Cup	League Cup	Total
21	(Hungary)	Márton Fülöp	9	0	1	10
1	(Republic of Ireland)	Brian Murphy	0	0	2	2
12	(England)	Arran Lee-Barrett	2	0	0	2
Total			11	0	3	14

=== Disciplinary record ===
No.	Pos	Nat	Player	Championship		FA Cup		League Cup		Total	
No.	Pos	Nat	Player	Yellow card	Red card	Yellow card	Red card	Yellow card	Red card	Yellow card	Red card
2	DF	(Canada)	Jamie Peters	1	0	0	0	0	0	1	0
3	DF	(Republic of Ireland)	Shane O'Connor	0	0	0	0	1	0	1	0
4	DF	(Northern Ireland)	Gareth McAuley	4	0	0	0	0	0	4	0
5	DF	(Republic of Ireland)	Damien Delaney	6	1	0	0	0	0	6	1
6	MF	(England)	Grant Leadbitter	10	1	0	0	1	0	11	1
7	MF	(Trinidad and Tobago)	Carlos Edwards	2	0	0	0	0	0	2	0
8	MF	(England)	David Norris	9	0	1	0	2	0	12	0
9	FW	(England)	Connor Wickham	6	0	0	0	2	0	8	0
10	FW	(Trinidad and Tobago)	Jason Scotland	2	0	0	0	0	0	2	0
11	MF	(England)	Lee Martin	4	1	0	0	0	0	4	1
12	GK	(England)	Arran Lee-Barrett	1	0	0	0	0	0	1	0
14	MF	(England)	Jake Livermore	1	0	0	0	0	0	1	0
14	MF	(England)	Jimmy Bullard	1	0	0	0	0	0	1	0
16	FW	(Hungary)	Tamás Priskin	2	0	0	0	2	0	4	0
17	MF	(England)	Andros Townsend	0	1	0	0	0	0	0	1
19	MF	(England)	Luke Hyam	1	1	0	0	0	0	1	1
20	DF	(New Zealand)	Tommy Smith	1	0	0	0	1	0	2	0
21	GK	(Hungary)	Márton Fülöp	1	0	0	0	0	0	1	0
22	DF	(Wales)	Troy Brown	1	0	0	0	1	0	2	0
36	MF	(England)	Jack Colback	3	0	0	0	0	0	3	0
37	FW	(Australia)	Rory Fallon	1	0	0	0	0	0	1	0
39	DF	(Republic of Ireland)	Mark Kennedy	3	0	0	0	0	0	3	0
48	DF	(Republic of Ireland)	Darren O'Dea	2	0	0	0	1	0	3	0
Total				62	5	1	0	11	0	74	5

== Awards ==
=== Player awards ===
Award	Player	Ref
Player of the Year	(England) Jimmy Bullard	
Young Player of the Year	(Northern Ireland) Josh Carson	

=== Football League Championship Player of the Month ===
Month	Player	Ref
February	(England) Connor Wickham	

=== Football League Young Player of the Year ===
Player	Ref
(England) Connor Wickham	

=== Championship Apprentice Award ===
Player	Ref
(England) Connor Wickham	
