= Howard Wilson (physicist) =

British plasma physicist

Howard Read Wilson FInstP is a British physicist specialising in plasma physics and fusion energy. He is Director of Science and Technology for the Spherical Tokamak for Energy Production (STEP) programme.

He was previously Professor of Plasma Physics at the University of York, where he established the York Plasma Institute, and has held senior positions at the United Kingdom Atomic Energy Authority (UKAEA) and Oak Ridge National Laboratory (ORNL).

== Early life and education ==
Wilson studied physics at Durham University, graduating in 1985. He became interested in fusion energy through his final-year undergraduate project. He received his PhD in theoretical particle physics from the University of Cambridge in 1988.

== Career and research ==
Wilson joined the UKAEA at Culham in 1988 as a theoretical plasma physicist working on the British fusion programme. His research included plasma turbulence and edge-localized modes, instabilities which can eject heat and particles from a fusion plasma.

Wilson remained at Culham until 2005, when he was appointed Professor of Plasma Physics at the University of York to establish a fusion research and training programme. In 2011, he led the establishment of the York Plasma Institute and served as its first director until 2019.

In 2017, Wilson was seconded part-time to the UKAEA as Research Programme Director for its national fusion programme. He subsequently played a leading role in developing the proposal for STEP and served as its first interim director from 2019 to 2020, before returning full-time to York.

In 2023, Wilson joined Oak Ridge National Laboratory in the United States as Fusion Pilot Plant Research and Development Lead. He returned to the United Kingdom in 2025 to become Director of Science and Technology for STEP.

Wilson's research focuses on the theory and computation of magnetically confined plasmas for fusion energy. His research interests include plasma turbulence and transport, edge-localized modes and core plasma stability. He has also worked on the design of fusion devices, particularly those based on the spherical tokamak concept.

== Honours and awards ==
Wilson is a Fellow of the Institute of Physics. In 2011, he received a Royal Society Wolfson Research Merit Award.
