= Soccer AM =

British football–based talk show, 1994–2023

- Starring: Jane Hoffen (1995); Russ Williams (1995–96); Gary A. Stevens (1995–96); Helen Chamberlain (1995–2017); Tim Lovejoy (1996–2007); Vince Henderson (1997); Andy Goldstein (2007–08); Max Rushden (2008–2015); Lloyd Griffith (2017–2019); John Fendley (2015–2023); Jimmy Bullard (2017–2023)
- Opening theme: Playground (Andy Powell, Linda Roan, Dominic Marsh, 2015–2023)
- Country of origin: United Kingdom
- Original language: English

Production
- Production locations: Studio H, Osterley, London (1994–2012); Studio G (Sky 2) (2012–2016); Studio F (Sky 2) (2018–2023)
- Camera setup: Multi-camera
- Running time: 240 minutes (1994–2001); 180 minutes (2001–2010); 120 minutes (2010–2016); 90 minutes (2016–2023)

Original release
- Network: Sky Sports
- Release: 20 August 1994 – 27 May 2023

Soccer AM is a British football-based comedy talk show, produced by Sky Sports. It aired from 20 August 1994 to 27 May 2023 on Sky Showcase, Sky Sports Premier League and Sky Sports Football. From 2010, the programme was put on a short broadcast delay to allow censoring of profanity or other issues before it went to air.

Its best-known presenters were Helen Chamberlain, who presented the show for 22 years, and Tim Lovejoy, who hosted from 1996 to 2007. Its final set of presenters were John Fendley and ex-footballer Jimmy Bullard.

On 22 March 2023, Sky announced that the show would be axed after the end of the current footballing season. The final episode aired on Saturday 27 May 2023, the day before the end of the 2022–23 Premier League season.

== Key features ==
=== Fans of the Week ===
The "Fans of the Week" feature is a mainstay of the show - eight fans of a British football club feature as studio guests every week, seated in a section of the set known as the "Luther Blissett Stand", introduced in December 1997. They were featured in various aspects of the show, culminating in a team footballing challenge at the end of the programme. The feature was dropped for the 2015–16 season when the programme's running time was cut to 90 minutes.

=== The car park game ===
The challenge involved fans attempting to kick a football through a number of holes within the sixty second time limit. The challenge had been renamed almost every season, along with the props and background music for the feature. The other studio guests all have the opportunity to attempt to score as well. Its various guises through the years include:

- "You Know The Drill Live" (2018–2023) - Jimmy Bullard provides the demonstration to the ball shooting techniques, then challenges in-studio guests to recreate the best goals within the sixty second time limit. The goals that they've scored represent points. It began in 2016, where Tubes defeats Fenners in a volley challenge with 8–3. It also returned in 2018 after 2 years as one-off segment, with Bullard battling Robbie Fowler in a Double Bubble challenge. Fowler won the challenge with 10–9.
- "Soccer AM Pro AM" (2017–2023) - Fans must answer some trivia questions from Fenners throughout the football world within 5 minutes. If the contestants got the correct answer, an in-studio guest is ready to attack. But if the contestants got the answer wrong, other celebrity guests are ready to attack. The contestants are a set of football fans. There will be 5 ball shooting techniques for £50: Penalty Shootout, Volley, One-on-One with a goalkeeper, Crossbar and Free Kick.
- "Volley Challenge" (2015–2023) - Fans must volley a shot and try and score past a "celebrity" keeper each week. The contestants are a set of football fans.
- "World Cup Worldies" – Jimmy Bullard and an in-studio guest, or maybe Bullard himself must compete in a challenge in order to recreate the best World Cup goals from the past within a time limit.
- "The Champions League" (2012–2015) – The game has been reworked, now featuring five panels - each decorated with the name and logo of one of the five highest Leagues, with a hole in each of increasing elevation and decreasing width. Fans are challenged to hit the ball into each hole in order, from League 2 up to the Champions League, within 60 seconds.
- "Wembley 2011" (2010–11) – Fans now have a much larger hole to kick the ball through. The set now features a hole in the number 0 (of the inflated year 2011), the curtain of the Champions League logo, and the stadium in which the final will be played, Wembley.
- "The Glory Hole" (2009–10) – Fans now have a much larger hole to kick the ball through. The set now features a large Premier League trophy, as well as the curtain of the Soccer AM logo.
- "Road To Rome" (2008–09) – Fans now have a much larger hole to kick the ball through. The set now features a large Champions League trophy surrounded by players such as Steven Gerrard, Ryan Giggs, and Billy McNeill. Other features of the set include Julius Caesar holding up a red card and a red carpet displaying the Champions League logo along with the city in which the final will be played, Rome.
- "Hollywood" (2007–08) – following David Beckham's move to the Los Angeles Galaxy, the game featured a Hollywood Walk of Fame-style "pavement" leading to the familiar target with a David Beckham mock-up alongside it. The stars included friends of the show with Jeff Stelling as the biggest star on the walkway. Noel Gallagher, Ricky Hatton, Mani, and Kasabian's Sergio Pizzorno also featured.
- "Road to Wembley II" (2006–07) – a revision of 2005–06's "Road to Wembley" – a tongue-in-cheek response to the failure of Wembley Stadium to be completed in time for 2006 FA Cup final. On 26 August 2006, Kasabian guitarist and vocalist Sergio Pizzorno scored what was hailed to be the best goal on Soccer AM by Helen Chamberlain – flicking the ball up in front of him and unleashing a spectacular right footed volley clean through the hole target whilst wearing cowboy style boots.
- "Road to Wembley" (2005–06) – the original edition was named to celebrate the return of the FA Cup Final to Wembley Stadium in May 2006, although remained unchanged despite The FA's announcement that the stadium would not be complete, and be relocated to Millennium Stadium in Cardiff. The challenge was 'scoring' by hitting the ball through the hole in the letter "b" (of the inflated word "Wembley") as many times as possible in 80 seconds from 12 yards. Viewers are encouraged to text in and guess the number of times the "Fans of the Week" will get the ball through the "b". This is done with the background music of "Que Sera, Sera". Teams who score seven or more times won an "Easy" T-shirt for each member.
- "We Are the Champions League" (2004–05) – celebrating Sky Sports' purchase of broadcasting rights for the Champions League, the central star of a 3D Champions' League logo was removed and made the target from 12 yards. The background music was, "Blitzkrieg Bop" by Ramones.
- "Feed The Iron Curtain" (2002–03) – fans had to kick the ball through the Iron Curtain as many times as possible in one minute. Meanwhile, the Eastern European substitutes (wearing red TCCCP tracksuits - a pun on the old СССР shirts and TCP the antiseptic) would warm-up, a memorable moment from "Feed the Iron Curtain" was when one of the celebrities missed the "goal" and kicked the rebounding ball in frustration and the ball hit one of the eastern European substitutes in the face. This celebrity was Frank McAvennie and Tim and Helen loved it so much that they renamed the car park The Frank McAvennie Car Park in his honour.
- "World Cup 2002" (2001–02) – a giant face of Sven-Göran Eriksson with his mouth wide open was the target, with the background music of "Sven, 'Gor-don', Eriksson, tra, lala, lala!" (to the tune of Brown Girl in the Ring).
- "Feed the Goat" (2000–01) – the target being the mouth of a giant goat, with the background music of "Feed The Goat And He Will Score" (to the tune of Cwm Rhondda) – a popular terrace chant for Shaun Goater at Manchester City.
- "Lob Star" (1999–00) – The target was a large net, held up by a lobster. The object being to chip the ball into the net from distance. Notably, Neil Lennon successfully found the target, only to be told he had done so before the whistle. Following the whistle, he repeated the feat.
- "Chips" (1998–99) – As the name suggested, the ball had to be chipped into the target. This had to be done over a short "brick" wall. The ball boys at this time were American state troopers in the style of those in the popular TV show CHiPs.
- "Rob Jones" (1996–1998) – A round target with a head shot photo of Liverpool defender Rob Jones glued onto it. The target was on a spring sticking out of a small box. Each week Tim would joke 'because Rob Jones hasn't scored for Liverpool in the 2/3/4/5 seasons he's been playing for them'.

=== Soccerette ===
The Soccer AM Soccerette was a feature of the show for several years. A young woman modelling a Soccer AM T-shirt, which was redesigned each season acted as a competition prize. Viewers can win the T-shirt by guessing the number of goals scored by the "Fans of the Week" in their team challenge later in the show. The Soccerette was introduced by the male presenter and was asked a series of questions that almost inevitably led into premeditated gags and innuendo.

The Soccerette was asked about her marital status, which results in rampant cheers if "single", and boos if the Soccerette "has a boyfriend" or "married" (although the latter was fairly rare), and a crew member would run on without a shirt and react. Former host Tim Lovejoy used to declare that the Soccerette's relationship will "never last", regardless of how long they had been together.

Famous Soccerettes have included Natalie Sawyer, Jennifer Metcalfe, Lucy Pinder, Tamsin Greenway, Gemma Atkinson and Louise Cliffe. This segment was dropped in 2015.

== Footballing features ==
=== Shocker Saturday / Sky Spoof News ===
Shocker Saturday is a segment parodying Sky Sports News' Soccer Saturday, featuring Fendley playing the part of Jeff Stelling. The studio guests, standing in front of a green-screen in the studio, pretend to be match reporters. During his time co-presenting the show, Lloyd Griffith played a character named "Glen Stefani", an obvious reference to American singer-songwriter Gwen Stefani. Fendley and the "reporters" all typically link into humorous clips of various footballing antics, in addition to some non-football clips.

Sky Spoof News was a segment featuring Lloyd Griffith playing a Sky Sports News presenter named "Glen Stefani", typically alongside one of the actual presenters from the channel. The segment typically features blunders from presenters and journalists, as well as entertaining football clips. On occasion, Griffith also presented from other events such as the PDC World Darts Championship.

=== Unbelievable Tekkers ===
Unbelievable Tekkers is a segment featuring a clip of football action from the past week, usually the best goal or piece of skill of the week. The phrase was apparently first used by Andy Ansah on Wayne Rooney's Street Striker, with the word "tekkers" meaning "technique". The introduction goes "Some tekkers are good..." (with clip of a great Wayne Rooney overhead kick), "Some tekkers are bad..." (with clip of David Dunn miskicking and falling over) "but some tekkers..." (Andy Ansah clip) "Unbelievable Tekkers!" The 2010–11 season Soccer AM T-shirt also featured this phrase.

The segment is, as of 2019, called Obscene Skill, featuring a clip of football action, ending with a clip of Jamie Carragher saying "That's obscene that is!".

=== Nutmeg Files ===
A nutmeg is the term applied when a player plays the ball between his opponent's legs and regains control of the ball after going round him. Another ever-present feature of the show, the weekly edition of "The Nutmeg Files" shows a clip from the previous week's football matches of a player being nutmegged, while the "nutmegger" is superimposed shouting "NUTS!", "¡Caňo!" (Brazil/Portugal), "Tunnel" (Italy) and "Petit Pont" (France), depending on which country the "nutmegger" is from. This feature is (very loosely) based on The Rockford Files.

The segment is, as of 2019, called Megnuts of the Week.

=== Third Eye ===
Third Eye has been a feature of the show from its outset, and involves viewers sending in often-comical mishaps from the television (generally football matches) that may well have been missed by the majority of the viewing audience. These typically involve people falling over or being caught doing something stupid.

=== Taxi ===
The feature Taxi!, accompanied by the theme tune of the US sitcom, consists of yet more clips from the previous week's live football. The clips chosen are typically embarrassing displays of showboating gone wrong. The embarrassed player's name is then suffixed to the voice-over phrase "TAXI FOR...". Concluding with the quote "Taxi is filmed in front of a live stadium audience."

The presenters highlight several embarrassing moments from the previous week's football, the worst comes last and is usually introduced with:

"It's time for a trip to (stadium)".
"Taxi for (name)!"

=== Team Mates ===
Team Mates is the section at the end of the show where a player from a football team is interviewed about their teammates, being asked questions such as which teammate is the best trainer or has the worst dress sense.

=== The Crossbar Challenge ===
The Crossbar Challenge is a feature that involves a weekly trip to the training ground of a British league football team. The entire squad, including willing coaching staff and managers, are filmed, one-by-one, introducing themselves and attempting to hit the crossbar of the goal from the halfway line. The feat is rarely accomplished - the majority of squads fail to hit the bar once. However, a successful strike generally provokes manic celebrations by the kicker and his teammates. The original background music is the instrumental "Seventeen Years" by Ratatat but this was changed to "Smiling" by The Beta Band.

The current record is held by Wolverhampton Wanderers who hit the crossbar four times on 25 April 2009. The current player record is held by Graham Stack who has hit the bar three times for three different clubs (Wolves, Plymouth and Millwall).

In 2007, the Ice Patrol Ship HMS Endurance's 1XI team carried out The Crossbar Challenge in Antarctica, with the goalposts semi buried in fresh snow. This was shown on the show and is acknowledged as the most southerly Crossbar Challenge, to date.

=== Skill Skool ===
A pre-recorded section where two members of a football team – usually a youth/academy side – pits their wits against each in showing off their best individual skills with the football. It involves a different side each week. Rocket presents this part with the two opponents, surrounded by their teammates, and with the appropriate drum and bass backing tune of "Don't Wanna Know" by Shy FX, T-Power, Di and Skibadee. He begins by saying to the footballers (named Joe and Bob for example):

"Joe, Bob, Welcome to Skill Skool. You know the rules, three rounds, best skill wins. Let's get the lesson on!"

Sublime individual skills are shown by each competitor while being egged on by their teammates. After each have completed 3 rounds, Rocket says:

"Joe/Bob, good skills. But there's only one winner.... Guys, give it up for Joe (cue cheering and applause). Give it up for Bob (bigger/lesser cheering and applause) Bob, you're the Skill Skool winner. Skills!"

Rocket proceeds to thrust the ball into the mid-rift of the winner, while the teammates usually mob and even sometimes perform some prank.

A live version of the segment where two freestylers pit their wits against each in showing off their best individual skills, to involve a different side. Rocket presents this part with the two opponents, surrounded by an audience from the car park, and with the same tune and rules with a short time limit addition.

=== My Favourite Goal ===
A famous footballer is asked to name his three favourite goals throughout his career so far, and the choices are played (in reverse order) at various stages throughout the show. Notable appearances have included Thierry Henry, Wayne Rooney, David Beckham, and Ryan Giggs. Ruud van Nistelrooy in this section was only asked to pick his top three favourite goals for Manchester United. The song used during the older version of 'My Favourite Goal' is "Strange and Beautiful (I'll Put a Spell on You)" by Aqualung.

=== Our Man In A Caff ===
This sketch involves crew member Trev, dressing up in a builders outfit, sitting in a café and reading the newspaper (presumably tabloid) and giving us his account of recent events in football and footballers all over the world, in a parody of James Richardson from Football Italia. This is a skit on the typical lazy English builder, having lunch in a café. Our Man In A Caff ends with Trev signing out with 'Over an Out' plus an added sign off from somebody or from somewhere.

=== I'm an A League Celebrity, Get Me Out Of Here ===
This weekly sketch involves two crew members playing the part of Ant and Dec in Australia as if presenting the ITV show I'm A Celebrity, Get Me Out Of Here, who introduce football clips from Australia's A-League, typically featuring former Premier League star Robbie Fowler, accompanied by a parody Australian commentary which is filled with references to soap operas. While the football clip is playing, a guest attempts a "bushtucker trial" trying to find a star in "Georgie Thompson's box", a cardboard box with a picture of said Sky Sports News presenter on the front and shown to contain some form of unpleasant creature, a task at which the guest always fails. The end of the sketch generally sees "Ant" hit in the eyes by some kind of object or substance and shouting "I'm blind, Dec!", a reference to a scene from the teenage drama Byker Grove in which the real-life Ant and Dec first found fame.

=== You Know The Drill ===
The You Know The Drill challenge was introduced in 2015. It is also a pre-recorded section that involves a weekly trip to some training grounds and stadiums. Jimmy Bullard presents this part with willing coaching staff and managers by demonstrating ball shooting techniques before he challenges every member of a football team for a goal-scoring battle, to determine the winner with the most goals scored by the points. The end of the segment is the decision for the winner of this challenge, alongside a catchphrase of Bullard saying "Football's always the winner!". A live version of the segment began in 2016, where Tubes battles Fenners in a volley challenge. Its live version also returned in 2018, where Fenners presents this part from the car park with Jimmy Bullard demonstrating ball shooting techniques. Then Bullard challenges every guests, such as professional and legendary footballers, willing coaching staff and managers, as well as celebrities, for a goal-scoring battle within the sixty second time limit, also to determine the winner with the most goals scored by the points.

== Other past comedy features ==
Current, and former performing crew members include "Fenners" (John Fendley), "Sheephead" (Joe Worsley), "Tubes" (Peter Dale), "Rocket" (James Long), Neil (Smythe), Robbie Knox (TRAMP! is sung every time he is mentioned to the tune of The Champ by The Mohawks), Jon Dyson, Chris Nutbeam and newest member Steve Sutcliffe, as well as "Curly" (James Kirtland).

=== Tubes ===
Crew member "Tubes" (Peter Dale) has had a regular feature on the show, where he has "one question and one question only" to one of the studio guests. Max asks "Who is your question for this week", and the answer results in a dimming of the studio lights and a spotlight on the questionee. After the question has been asked Tubes goes to shake the questionees hand thanking them as he does. Tubes' popularity has grown significantly - a public vote saw him being voted more popular than (crew member) Rocket - in part due to his woeful (but comic) rapping ability which he demonstrates every week before actually posing a question, his ability to keep a "straight" face is also one of his main attributes. Due to his weekly binge drinking exploits, Tim Lovejoy called for pub landlords across the country to ban Tubes from their establishments for his own good. Tubes' rapping has also been used in a parody of iTunes, where at the end instead of saying "iTunes", it says "iTubes". Some Of Tubes' Catchphrases include "Sickening" "Sick" and "Sickness".

The segment had been discontinued and replaced by his usual interview with professional and legendary footballers, or some willing coaching staff and managers, starting in 2015.

Tubes suffered a heart attack in January 2018 and spent time off show whilst recovering.

When Tubes was unable to conduct an interview, Fenners would be on a set to have a chat with the biggest names in football, such as Pep Guardiola, Craig Shakespeare, Arsène Wenger, Marcus Rashford and José Mourinho.

=== The Dance-Off ===
Each year, the Soccer AM Dance-Off was held which is a dancing competition usually involving all crew members. The crew have 15 seconds each to dance before the next contestant goes on, and each dance usually receives good natured laughing and booing from the audience. In 2014 the first and only member of the public Lee Woods participated in the ‘Dance off’ after an audition that won the public vote. During his performance Lee slipped on baked beans which had been placed on the floor earlier by crew member Frankie Fryer sparking the controversial and infamous ‘Beangate’ incident. Lee was the bookmakers hot favourite to win but after the slip Rocket subsequently took the crown. Rocket was the undisputed Dance off champion with 5 wins to his name, he has a tattoo to commemorate his success. The ‘Dance off’ feature ended in 2015.

== Former comedy features ==
Following Tim Lovejoy's departure, several of the crew members including "Fenners" (John Fendley), "Sheephead" and Robbie Knox also departed, which meant the end of some of the features of the show. Adam Smith (Baby Elvis/Franky Fryer) departed from the show as well to become a permanent host of Saturday Social.

=== Boston Goals ===
From 2004 to 2007 the previous weekends highlights from Boston United's games featured in their own segment called "Boston Goals". Presented by "Mike Schweinberger" and "Randy Wakeman III", Boston were coined as "the League's only American side" alluding to the City of Boston, Massachusetts and making a play on United's nickname "The Pilgrims" which was named after the settlers of the same name. The commentary would be exaggerated and 'Americanized' with various phrases featured in American sports like Baseball, Basketball and American football featuring heavily. Phrases featured were "PK" for a penalty, "Corner Restart" for a corner, "Ejected" for a red card, "Rejected" for a save by the goalkeeper, "Top body strike" for a header. Shots or goals hit into the top corner would be described as hit towards the "upper 90" or "lower 90" with phrases such as "Touchdown" occasionally used to describe a goal and "fumble" when a player would lose a ball to the other team, a goalkeeper was occasionally referred to as a "Point Guard" The feature ended when Boston United were relegated from the Football League at the end of the 2006–07 season.

=== Small Talk ===
In Small Talk, Rocket and Arrogant Baby Elvis go around the streets of a chosen British town and ask a question related to a current event in the Football world e.g. in the episode from 13 September 2008, Baby Elvis asked people in Doncaster how they keep fit, following reports of Dimitar Berbatov being on an intensive fitness programme after his recent move to Manchester United.

=== Big Stan Hibbert ===
His catchphrases were "I'm Here All Week & Centrifugal Force".

=== Topless Weather ===
Sheephead reads the weather, with frequent references to gravy and a light drizzle.

=== Brad Bobley ===
This is a sketch which was a parody of the new American manager of Swansea City, Bob Bradley. The sketch is a light-hearted take on the way Americans take "Soccer" and expressions used. Phrases were coined in a similar way to the previous Boston Goals sketch as Fenners who had played "Mike Schweinberger" also played Bobley. The theme was the "Brad Bobley Soccer Camp" and each week he would show participants how to execute a variety of different football skills such as Penalties, Free Kicks and challenges. The segment would often feature Bobley lambasting and swearing at Rocket and hitting him over the head with his clipboard. He coined the phrase "Megnuts, so sweet" in reference to a "Nutmeg". The real Bradley was dismissed after only a few months in the Swansea job, but Soccer AM continued with the Brad Bobley character for the rest of the 2016–17 season. This led to a new feature called "Megnuts of the Week". When asked about Bradley's sacking AFC Bournemouth manager, Eddie Howe accidentally referred to him by naming him "Brad". This was picked up on by the show who played it the following week.

== Other features ==
=== Soccer AM webcam ===
The Soccer AM Webcam was introduced in the start of the 10th season. Refreshing every 5 seconds, it gave viewers the opportunity to view a live feed from the Soccer AM Office. Due to popular demand, it was later upgraded to refreshing every 3 seconds. The webcam soon gained its own feature on the show - a soap picking out the best behind-the-scenes moments from the office, and concluding with a cliffhanger of a will he-won't he. The webcam broke in between seasons in the summer of 2006, but at the start of the following season the team announced that a new webcam had been installed with improved pictures as well as the ability for the team to zoom in on certain aspects of the office.

=== The Ten-Yard Bucket Challenge ===
Borne out of the link between professional footballers and golf, "The Ten-Yard Bucket Challenge" sees a professional footballer attempting to chip a golf ball into a bucket from a distance of ten yards. The football-golf link exists due mainly to the amount of free time footballers are allowed in the daytime after training sessions, and Soccer AM's homage to golf involves a single personality from the world of football who attempts the challenge. One notable attempt was from Ryan Taylor, then of Tranmere Rovers, who was not featuring in the challenge that week, but was accompanying teammate Jason McAteer. While cameras happened to be rolling, he had a go and accomplished the feat in a single attempt. Many overconfident amateurs have been known to run tallies of well over a hundred attempts. The background music to the challenge is "Ladyflash" by The Go! Team.

=== Bullseye Challenge ===
A part of the show where two players from a club compete to see who can hit the bullseye of a dart board first. The current holder with only two throws is Emmanuel Eboue whilst he was playing for Arsenal.

== Achievements ==
As its audience share grew, its influence grew in turn. Some of the show's notable influences have included:

- The Save Chip campaign saw large "Save Chip" banners appear all over the world, not only in football matches. The full tag line was "Save Chip... Don't Let Sarah win!". The campaign involved a football fan's plea to help save him from his girlfriend Sarah, who would not let him watch his favourite sport. It became a cult when banners appeared at countless televised football matches across the country and also made airtime in WWE wrestling events, rugby matches and many more televised sporting (and non sporting) events. The banner also appears randomly in the first screens of the PC video game Championship Manager: Season 01/02 released by Sports Interactive. Marc Bridge-Wilkinson also promoted the campaign after scoring the winner in the 2001 LDV Final for Port Vale, lifting his shirt over his head revealing a shirt underneath which said "Save Chip"
- Getting a golden star on the England football shirt. Sparked after France 98, when the France national team added a golden star to their shirt as soon as they won the FIFA World Cup, the Soccer AM team successfully campaigned to get a golden star on England's shirt to commemorate winning the World Cup in 1966.
- Getting the word "bouncebackability" into the English dictionary has been credited to Soccer AM. Its creation is generally accredited to former Crystal Palace manager Iain Dowie's reference to his team's return to form in 2005, and the Soccer AM team took it upon themselves to continuously refer to the subject until their feat was accomplished later that year.

The "Easy" logo from the male T-shirt

- The Soccer AM regulars are immortalised in the computer game Football Manager 2005, as an unmanageable team called The Badgers. Amongst the 'players' are Rocket, Tubes, Sheephead, Paul Dalglish, Fenners, Phil Neal, John Wark and of course, Tim Lovejoy himself. All of the players can be signed by the player. They have also been featured in Football Manager 2012, featuring Max Rushden as captain.
- The World of Wrestling sketch exploded into British culture in 2005. After destroying his opponent in a public place (e.g. a swimming pool), the masked "red" wrestler began a chant of "Easy! Easy!, whilst clapping his hands above his head, before stopping telling an observer "You shut up!" and resuming his chant of "Easy! Easy!". The sketch is a parody and play on words of the World of Sport wrestling, which had been repeated on TWC Fight! starting in early 2004. In the sketch, the masked wrestlers are based on Kendo Nagasaki, whilst the chanting is taken from Big Daddy. This chanting action has since been reintroduced thanks to the sketch and is now seen across the UK at all kinds of events - sporting or otherwise.

== Other content ==
- Tim Lovejoy offered five of "the queen's English pounds" to anyone who went to an English football match with a banner saying "Lovejoy is a legend", although he soon stopped after it ended up costing him too much money (mainly after Sky Sports's match coverage picked up on the competition, showing a number of banners before each match).
- Tim Lovejoy and Bradley Walsh were flown by helicopter after the show to do Sky's fanzone commentary for the Arsenal v Chelsea FA Cup Final in 2002. Lovejoy has been ridiculed on Soccer AM ever since for saying "Oh it's okay, it's only Ray Parlour" moments before Parlour's spectacular opener in the 2–0 win, to which Walsh replied "That is some goal!". Whenever Parlour is mentioned, they find some way to bring this up.
- The programme has been known to jokingly change its name in its on-air graphics to Soccer PM when a show has run into the afternoon.

== Football League Trophy Play Your Cards Right ==
For some seasons, Soccer AM had the privilege of being able to draw fixtures for each round of the Football League Trophy.

This was normally done - in the style of British gameshow Play Your Cards Right - by the presenters cutting oversized cards onto large holders, and turning them over one at a time to generate football matches. This process was overseen by an independent adjudicator from the Football League Stuart Trigwell, known to Soccer AM as 'face', ridiculing a column in the Daily Mail referring to him as the 'Face of The Football League'.

== Merchandise ==
Four Soccer AM DVDs were released by Universal Pictures Video - The Top Ten Goals of All Time in November 2004, The Ten Greatest Players of the Last Ten Years the following year, The Greatest Matches of All Time in 2006, and Dream Team - The Greatest Team in the World in 2009.

A soundtrack of indie and rock music featured in the show's goal compilations was released in June 2006.

== The Soccer AM Stadium ==
In July 2014, Soccer AM announced a partnership with non-league Basingstoke Town F.C. The club's Camrose Stadium was renamed 'The Soccer AM Stadium' as part of the partnership – with the club featuring regularly on the show. "Soccer AM" producer, Rob Wakeling said "We’re really pleased to be supporting Basingstoke Town FC from now on – and we’ve got some very exciting things planned over the coming season".

== Soccer AM All-Sports Show ==
Soccer AM's All Sports Show was a spin-off of Soccer AM, launched in 2002 and originally hosted by Tim Lovejoy and Helen Chamberlain until 2004 when Andy Goldstein replaced Lovejoy and according to Andy when Tim left "he took all the writers with him".

It was shown on every Friday during the football season from 6-7:00 p.m. on Sky Sports 1, with repeats shown regularly throughout the night on Sky3 and Sky Sports 2.

When Lovejoy left Soccer AM in the summer of 2007, Goldstein was again called to replace him leaving the future of the All-Sports show in doubt. At the end of the 10th and final All Sports Show's weekly podcast it was confirmed that the show would not be returning for the 2007–08 season.

Unlike its sister programme, The All Sports show focuses on a wider range of sports. This means that as well as football, sports like cricket, rugby (both Union and League) and even "American sports" like the NFL and the NBA are covered on the show.

== See also ==
- Sky Sports
- Cricket AM
- Soccer AM's All Sports Show
