= Dan Harding =

English footballer (born 1983)

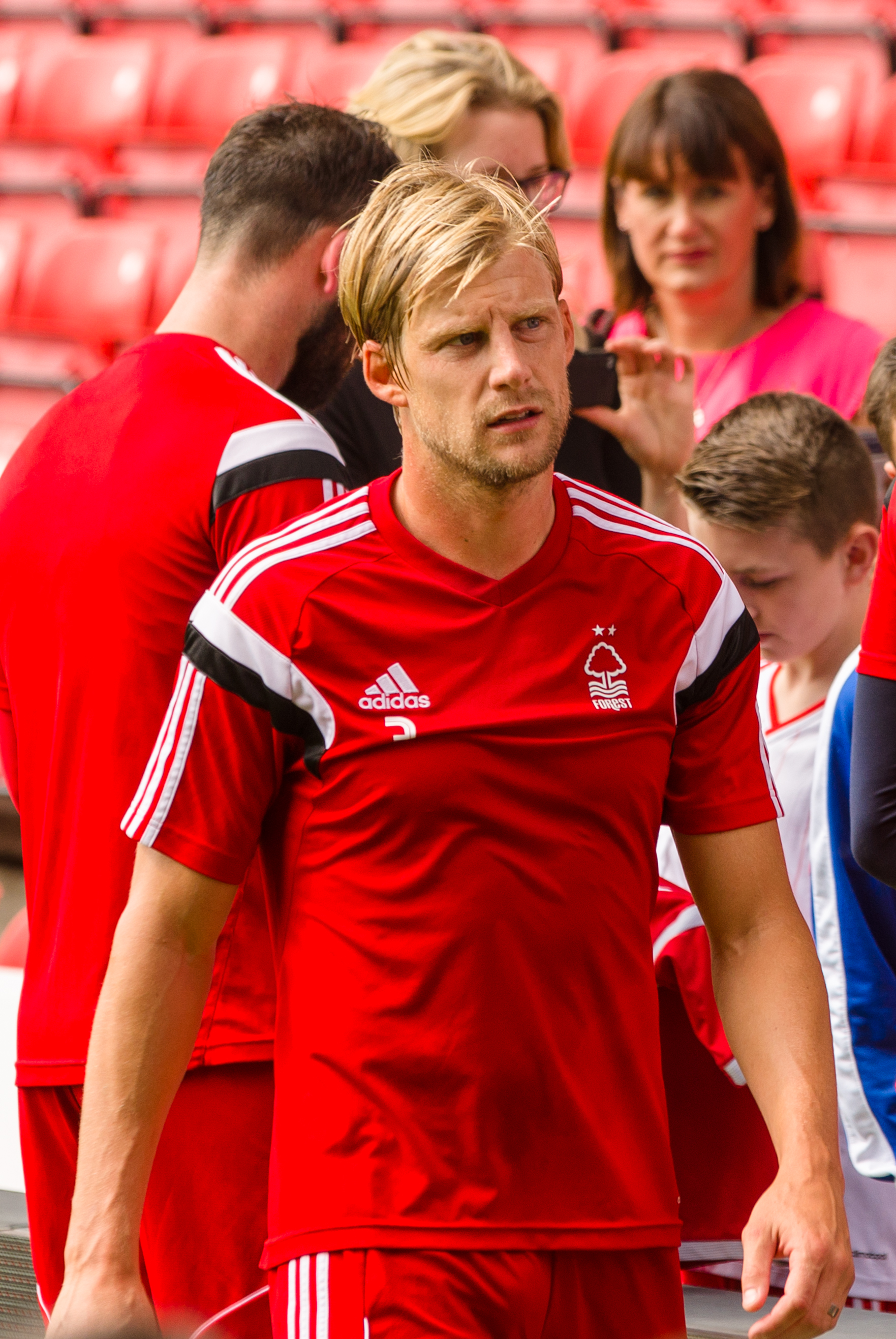
- Harding with Nottingham Forest in 2014

Personal information
- Full name: Daniel Andrew Harding
- Date of birth: 23 December 1983 (age 42)
- Place of birth: Gloucester, England
- Height: 6 ft 0 in (1.83 m)
- Position: Defender

Youth career
- 1999–2002: Brighton & Hove Albion

Senior career*
Years	Team	Apps	(Gls)
2002–2005	Brighton & Hove Albion	67	(1)
2005–2006	Leeds United	20	(0)
2006–2009	Ipswich Town	73	(1)
2008–2009	→ Southend United (loan)	19	(1)
2009	→ Reading (loan)	3	(0)
2009–2012	Southampton	98	(4)
2012–2015	Nottingham Forest	54	(0)
2015	→ Millwall (loan)	20	(0)
2015–2016	Eastleigh	31	(0)
2016–2017	Whitehawk	30	(1)
Total		415	(8)

International career
2004	England U21	4	(0)

Managerial career
- 2017: Whitehawk (Player caretaker manager)
- * Club domestic league appearances and goals

Daniel Andrew Harding (born 23 December 1983) is an English former professional footballer who played as a defender.

Harding began his career with Brighton & Hove Albion and has also played for Leeds United, Ipswich Town, Southend United, Reading, Southampton, Nottingham Forest and Millwall before joining Eastleigh and then Whitehawk in September 2016. Harding is a former England under-21 player.

== Career ==
=== Brighton & Hove Albion ===
Harding joined the Brighton & Hove Albion youth scheme in 1999 aged sixteen. After a successful run in the reserves he made his first Albion appearance as a substitute for Shaun Wilkinson in the 79th minute in a 2–0 home loss against Norwich City on 17 August 2002. This was his only appearance in the 2002–03 season after he suffered a back injury in October. In April 2003 Harding signed his first professional contract with the club.

After impressing in 2003–04 pre-season friendlies, Harding spent the first half of the season on the substitutes' bench with seven appearances. Soon after the appointment of manager Mark McGhee, Harding was selected to make his full debut against AFC Bournemouth on 21 February 2004 following the suspension of Kerry Mayo. The game ended in a 3–0 win for Bournemouth. Harding remained in the starting eleven for the remainder of the 2003–04 season and helped the club gain promotion to the Championship after beating Bristol City 1–0 in the play-off final in Cardiff. Harding finished the season making twenty-three appearances.

Harding was sent-off in the second match of the 2004–2005 season, a 2–0 loss to Plymouth Argyle. After the game manager Mark McGhee defended Harding and he regained his first team place and then scored his first goal for the club, in a 1–0 win over against Rotherham United. However, in the next game against Millwall Harding was at fault for the two goals which saw Brighton lose 2–0. He was also dropped by McGhee after making mistakes during a match against Stoke City. Despite this, Harding helped to keep the club in the Championship 2004–05, finishing 20th, their highest league position in 14 years.

After two seasons in which England's U21 coach Peter Taylor and a number of Premier League clubs had reportedly taken an interest in him, Harding was preparing to move on. With his contract expiring at the end of the 2004–05 season, he expressed an interest in a new long-term deal at the club and was initially offered a new two-year contract in 2004. Delays in resolving the negotiations led manager McGhee to publicly express unhappiness, with Harding denying he had turned down a new deal. In February 2005, McGhee re-opened contract talks with Harding, but three months later Harding rejected the revised deal.

During his time at Brighton Harding was given the nickname Mr Tickle by his teammates because of his long legs and arms, and at one point was nominated by FourFourTwo magazine as one of the best 50 players outside the Premiership along with teammate Leon Knight.

=== Leeds United ===
On 7 June 2005, Harding reportedly cut short a holiday to sign a three-year contract with Leeds United on a free transfer. Since he was under 24 years of age, Brighton were entitled to compensation to be decided by a tribunal. On 28 July, Leeds United were ordered to pay up to £850,000 to Brighton, with an initial payment of £450,000 and a further £400,000 dependent on appearances, international caps and promotion success.

Harding made his Leeds United debut in the opening game of the 2005–06 season in a 2–1 win over Millwall. He played his first match against his former club on 12 September 2005 and was booed by the away Brighton supporters every time he touched the ball. After appearing in the first seven matches of the season Harding was injured and lost his regular first team place. He went on to make twenty appearances.

=== Ipswich Town ===
After only one season at Leeds United, Harding moved to Ipswich Town in a part-exchange deal for Ian Westlake on 4 August 2006. Leeds also paid Ipswich £400,000 and a further £100,000 was dependent on Westlake's appearances. Harding made his Ipswich debut in the opening game of the season in a 2–1 loss against Crystal Palace. Harding then provided an assist for Sylvain Legwinski in a 3–1 win over Southend United on 21 October 2006. Harding established himself as first choice left back but despite suffering from an ankle injury that kept him out for three weeks, he won two awards in the Ipswich Town Player of the Year presentations.

Harding started the 2007–08 season in the first team and scored his first goal for Ipswich in a 3–1 defeat at Hull City on 29 September 2007. Harding also set up two goals in two games, starting with the first assist for Jonathan Walters in a 3–1 win over local rivals, Colchester United on 23 October 2007 and another assist for Danny Haynes in a 3–0 win over Wolves four days later. After missing three matches due to the performance of Sito, Harding was recalled for the match against Leicester City following Sito's injury. But after making one appearance Harding suffered a thigh injury that kept him out for a number of weeks. After making his return to the first team against Plymouth Argyle, Harding regained his first team place until Sito's return that kept him out of the first team for the rest of the season.

Manager Jim Magilton announced that Harding was no longer in his plans for the 2008–2009 season and on 7 August 2008 Harding moved to Southend United on a six-month loan deal with a view to a permanent deal. Harding made his Southend United debut in the opening game of the season in a 1–0 win over Peterborough United. Against Stockport County on 11 October 2008, Harding was sent-off in the 68th minute. After serving a three match ban Harding made his return from suspension and scored against former club Leeds in a 1–0 win on 28 October 2008. After the match, Shrimpers' manager Steve Tilson praised Harding's performance. After nineteen appearances for Southend, the club wanted Harding to stay but he opted to return to his parent club, even though Ipswich were still keen on selling him.

Harding made one further appearance for Ipswich in a 1–0 away win at Crystal Palace before joining Reading on loan in January 2009 for the remainder of the 2008–09 season. Harding made his Reading debut on 21 April 2009 in a 2–0 win over Derby County.

After talks with Ipswich's new manager Roy Keane in May 2009 Harding was told his contract would not be renewed and that he would be released by the club. After leaving Portman Road Harding went on trial at his former club Brighton & Hove Albion.

=== Southampton ===
On 21 July 2009 Harding signed a two-year deal with Southampton, becoming new manager Alan Pardew's first signing. Harding said joining the club was an easy decision the moment he received a phone call from Pardew.

Harding made his Southampton debut in the opening game of the season at left-back in a 1–1 draw against Millwall. Harding then scored his first goal for the club in a 1–1 draw with Brentford on 22 August 2009. His second goal came on 12 December 2009 in a 3–0 win over Tranmere Rovers, and his third on 13 March 2010 in a 1–0 win over Leeds United. In March 2010 Harding played in the Football League Trophy final at right-back in a 4–1 win over Carlisle United. Harding finished his first season at Southampton with forty-two appearances.

In the 2010–11 season, Harding retained his first team place, despite initially being dropped in favour of Ryan Dickson. Harding provided two assists later in the season: the first when he set up a goal for Rickie Lambert in a 4–1 win over Swindon Town on 26 February 2011; and the second when he set up a goal for Jonathan Forte to score his second of the game in a 3–2 win over Milton Keynes Dons on 2 April 2011. Harding helped the club secure promotion to The Championship after a two years absence. After making thirty-six appearances in the season he was named in the League One Team of the Year along with four teammates. His performances throughout the 2010–11 season were praised by Francis Benali. At the end of the season, Harding had an automatic one-year extension to his contract activated.

In the 2011–12 season, Harding was awarded a new three-year contract, and scored his first goal of the season in a 3–2 defeat at Leicester City on 27 August 2011. Throughout the 2011–12 season, Harding shared the left back spot with Danny Fox, making twenty appearances. Following Southampton's promotion to the Premier League, Harding's future at the club became more uncertain due to new signings.

=== Nottingham Forest ===
On 28 July 2012 Harding joined Nottingham Forest for an undisclosed fee on a three-year contract, hoping to win over the hearts of fans as a left back. Harding made his debut in the opening game of the season at left-back in a 1–0 win over Bristol City. Harding assisted an own goal from Pablo Ibáñez, in a 2–2 draw against Birmingham City on 15 September 2012 and then provided another assist for Andy Reid in a 1–0 win over Peterborough United on 6 October 2012. Soon after, Harding suffered a hamstring injury. After making his return to the first team against Wolverhampton Wanderers on 24 November 2012, Harding managed to regain his left-back position before being injured against Bristol City on 9 February 2013. After months on the sidelines, where he appeared on the bench on two occasions, Harding made his return in a 1–0 win over Millwall. Harding finished his first season at Nottingham Forest making twenty league appearances.

Harding started the 2013–14 season as an unused substitute before making his first start in a 3–1 win over Hartlepool United in the first round of League Cup. Harding played against Derby County, but was barely used in the first team as Chris Cohen was preferred in the left-back position. Harding made five appearances when Cohen was injured but then returned to the substitutes bench following the arrival of Danny Fox in January. Harding provided an assist for Jamie Paterson in a 2–1 loss against Millwall on 5 April 2014. He went on to make nineteen appearances for the club.

Ahead of the 2014–15 season there were suggestions that Harding might be sold by Forest, and he was approached by Orlando City about a move abroad. Having initially become a first team regular under manager Stuart Pearce, he was left out of the squad ahead of the match against Sheffield Wednesday in favour of Fox. In the first half of the season Harding had made eight appearances for the club. His manager Pearce praised Harding's attitude in fighting for his place in the team.

On 5 January 2015, Harding was loaned to Championship rivals Millwall until the end of the season. Five days after signing for the club, Harding made his Millwall debut at left-back in a 1–0 loss against Blackpool. Harding became a regular in the first team, making twenty appearances as Millwall were relegated to League One.

After his loan spell at Millwall came to an end Harding was among four players released by Nottingham Forest.

=== Eastleigh ===
Harding signed a two-year deal with National League club Eastleigh in August 2015 having turned down a move to Portsmouth, given his links with rivals Southampton.

Harding made his Eastleigh debut at left-back in the opening game of the season in a 4–0 win over Southport. After his debut Harding established himself in the first team and made nineteen appearances until he suffered a calf injury during the first round of the FA Cup against Crewe Alexandra. After a month on the sidelines Harding made his return to the first team in a 1–1 draw against Aldershot Town. In mid-February Harding suffered a hamstring injury during a 3–2 loss to Kidderminster Harriers. In his first season at Eastleigh, Harding made thirty-one appearances for the club. Ahead of the 2016–17 season Harding was placed on the transfer list by manager Chris Todd. On 2 August 2016 it was announced that he had been released by the club.

=== Whitehawk ===
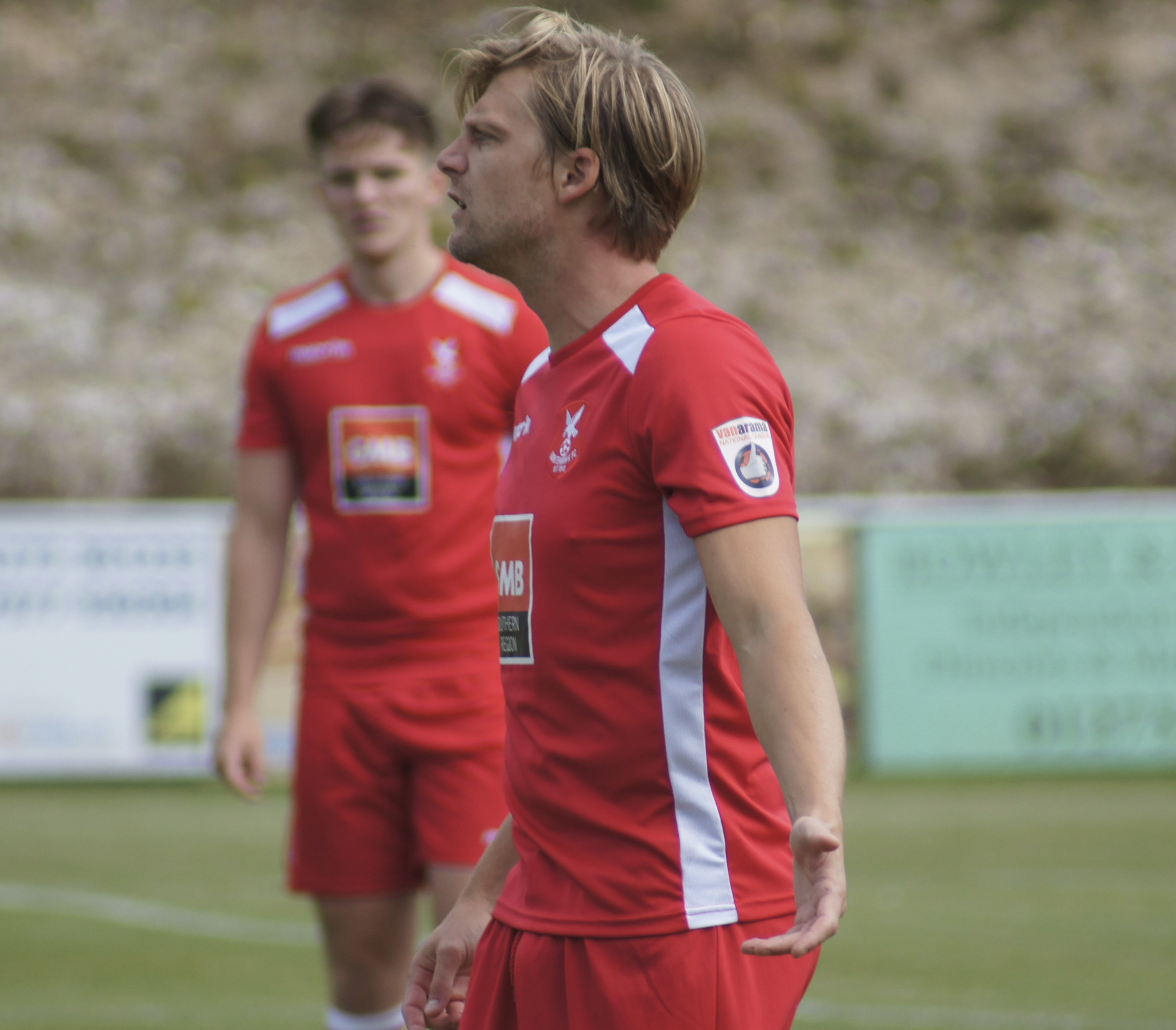
Harding playing for Whitehawk 2017

In September 2016 Harding returned to Brighton, signing for National League South side Whitehawk under his former boss at Eastleigh, Richard Hill. Harding re-signed as player-coach under new manager Jimmy Dack for the start of the 2016–17 season. Following Dack's resignation on 28 August 2017, Harding was appointed caretaker manager. After the permanent appointment of Steve King on 13 September 2017, Harding left the club on 21 September 2017.

== International career ==
In August 2004, Harding was called up by England under-21, which he describe the moment that left him shocked. Harding made his England U21 debut on 17 August 2004, in a 3–1 win over Ukraine U21. After the match, Harding was praised by Manager Taylor, quoting: "I was pleased with Dan. He has come on for 45 minutes and played very sensibly. He did not get beaten once." His performance was also praised by The Argus for his "combining intelligent use of the ball with sound defending". Harding went to make three more appearances for England U21.

== Personal life ==
Harding owned a Cocker Spaniel named Poppy. Harding revealed he grew up supporting Leeds United.

In October 2008, Harding's mother died from cancer. Harding dedicated his goal to his mother after scoring against his former club, Leeds United. Harding is friends with Matt Richards.

Harding and his wife, Vicki, have three children. In 2015, his wife was expecting triplets, but only one child survived.

== Career statistics ==
Appearances and goals by club, season and competition
Club	Season	League			FA Cup		League Cup		Other		Total	
Club	Season	Division	Apps	Goals	Apps	Goals	Apps	Goals	Apps	Goals	Apps	Goals
Brighton & Hove Albion	2002–03	First Division	1	0	0	0	0	0	—		1	0
Brighton & Hove Albion	2003–04	Second Division	23	0	0	0	2	0	5 (Note: Two appearances in Football League Trophy, three in Football League play-offs)	0	30	0
Brighton & Hove Albion	2004–05	Championship	43	1	1	0	1	0	—		45	1
Brighton & Hove Albion	Total		67	1	1	0	3	0	5	0	76	1
Leeds United	2005–06	Championship	20	0	0	0	1	0	0	0	21	0
Ipswich Town	2006–07	Championship	42	0	4	0	1	0	—		47	0
Ipswich Town	2007–08	Championship	30	1	0	0	1	0	—		31	1
Ipswich Town	2008–09	Championship	1	0	0	0	0	0	—		1	0
Ipswich Town	Total		73	1	4	0	2	0	—		79	1
Southend United (loan)	2008–09	League One	19	1	0	0	1	0	0	0	20	1
Reading (loan)	2008–09	Championship	3	0	0	0	0	0	2 (Note: Appearances in Football League play-offs)	0	5	0
Southampton	2009–10	League One	42	3	4	0	2	0	5 (Note: Appearance(s) in Football League Trophy)	1	53	4
Southampton	2010–11	League One	36	0	4	0	2	0	1	0	43	0
Southampton	2011–12	Championship	20	1	3	0	2	0	—		25	1
Southampton	Total		98	4	11	0	6	0	6	1	121	5
Nottingham Forest	2012–13	Championship	27	0	1	0	2	0	—		30	0
Nottingham Forest	2013–14	Championship	19	0	2	0	3	0	—		24	0
Nottingham Forest	2014–15	Championship	8	0	0	0	2	0	—		10	0
Nottingham Forest	Total		54	0	3	0	7	0	—		61	0
Millwall (loan)	2014–15	Championship	20	0	0	0	0	0	—		20	0
Eastleigh	2015–16	National League	31	0	3	0	—		—		34	0
Career total			385	7	22	0	20	0	13	1	440	8

== Honours ==
Brighton & Hove Albion

- Football League Second Division play-offs: 2004

Southampton

- Football League Trophy: 2009–10
- Football League One runner-up: 2010–11
- Football League Championship runner-up: 2011–12

Individual

- PFA Team of the Year: 2010–11 League One
