= 2008–09 Ipswich Town F.C. season =

Ipswich Town
2008–09 season
- Chairman: Marcus Evans
- Manager: Jim Magilton (until 22 April); Roy Keane (from 23 April)
- Stadium: Portman Road
- Championship: 9th
- FA Cup: Fourth round
- League Cup: Third round
- Top goalscorer: League: Jon Stead (12); All: Jon Stead (13)
- Highest home attendance: 28,274 (vs. Norwich City, 19 Apr 2009, Championship)
- Lowest home attendance: 10,477 (vs. Leyton Orient, 12 Aug 2008, League Cup)
- Average home league attendance: 20,961
| Home colours | Away colours |

During the 2008–09 English football season, Ipswich Town competed in the Football League Championship.

== Season summary ==
Ipswich Town had an average season in the Championship, finishing in ninth place, eight points away from the playoffs. Manager Jim Magilton was sacked in April after three seasons in charge of Ipswich and was replaced by former Sunderland boss Roy Keane.

== Kit ==
Ipswich Town retained the previous season's home kit, manufactured by English company Mitre, although Marcus Evans became the new kit sponsor. An all-red strip with black trimmings was Town's away kit.

== Players ==
=== First-team squad ===
Note: Flags indicate national team as defined under FIFA eligibility rules; some limited exceptions apply. Players may hold more than one non-FIFA nationality.

| No. | Pos. | Nation | Player |
|---|---|---|---|
| 1 | GK | ENG | Richard Wright |
| 2 | DF | ENG | David Wright |
| 4 | DF | NIR | Gareth McAuley (captain) |
| 5 | DF | IRL | Alex Bruce (Note: Bruce was born in Norwich, England, but also qualified to represent Northern Ireland and the Republic of Ireland internationally through his grandmother and represented the Republic of Ireland at U-21 and B level before making his international debut for the Republic of Ireland in May 2007; he would change his international allegiance to Northern Ireland in July 2011 and make his international debut for Northern Ireland in February 2013.) |
| 7 | MF | IRL | Owen Garvan |
| 8 | MF | ENG | Tommy Miller |
| 9 | FW | ESP | Pablo Couñago |
| 10 | MF | ENG | David Norris |
| 11 | FW | JAM | Kevin Lisbie (Note: Lisbie was born in Hackney, England, but also qualified to represent Jamaica internationally and made his international debut for Jamaica in 2002.) |
| 12 | DF | CAN | Jaime Peters |
| 13 | MF | ARG | Luciano Civelli |
| 14 | FW | ENG | Jon Stead |
| 15 | DF | NED | Pim Balkestein |

| No. | Pos. | Nation | Player |
|---|---|---|---|
| 17 | FW | ENG | Dean Bowditch |
| 18 | FW | ENG | Danny Haynes |
| 19 | FW | IRL | Jonathan Walters (Note: Walters was born in Moreton, England, but also qualified to represent Republic of Ireland internationally through his mother and represented them at U-21 and B level before making his international debut for the Republic of Ireland in November 2010.) |
| 20 | FW | MEX | Giovani dos Santos (on loan from Tottenham Hotspur) |
| 21 | DF | ESP | Iván Campo |
| 22 | DF | GER | Moritz Volz (on loan from Fulham) |
| 25 | MF | IRL | Alan Quinn |
| 26 | MF | MKD | Veliče Šumulikoski |
| 27 | GK | IRL | Shane Supple |
| 28 | GK | POL | Bartosz Białkowski (on loan from Southampton) |
| 30 | MF | ENG | Matt Richards |
| 33 | DF | WAL | Ben Thatcher (Note: Thatcher was born in Swindon, England, and represented them at U-21 level, but also qualified to represent Wales internationally through his grandmother and made his debut for Wales in March 2004.) |

=== Left club during season ===
Note: Flags indicate national team as defined under FIFA eligibility rules; some limited exceptions apply. Players may hold more than one non-FIFA nationality.

| No. | Pos. | Nation | Player |
|---|---|---|---|
| 6 | DF | ENG | Richard Naylor (to Leeds United) |
| 14 | FW | IRL | Alan Lee (to Crystal Palace) |

| No. | Pos. | Nation | Player |
|---|---|---|---|
| 20 | MF | ENG | Darren Ambrose (on loan from Charlton Athletic) |
| 23 | DF | ENG | Dan Harding (on loan to Reading) |

=== Reserve squad ===
Note: Flags indicate national team as defined under FIFA eligibility rules; some limited exceptions apply. Players may hold more than one non-FIFA nationality.

| No. | Pos. | Nation | Player |
|---|---|---|---|
| 16 | DF | NIR | Chris Casement |
| 24 | FW | IRL | Billy Clarke |
| 29 | MF | ENG | Ed Upson |
| 35 | DF | ENG | Tommy Smith (Note: Smith was born in Macclesfield, England, and represented them at U-17 and U-18 level, but was also raised in New Zealand and made his international debut for New Zealand in March 2010.) |
| 36 | MF | ENG | Liam Trotter |

| No. | Pos. | Nation | Player |
|---|---|---|---|
| 37 | DF | ENG | Kurt Robinson |
| 38 | FW | ENG | Jordan Rhodes (Note: Rhodes was born in Oldham, England, but also qualified to represent Scotland internationally through his father and represented them at U-21 level before making his international debut for Scotland in November 2011.) |
| 39 | MF | ENG | Jai Reason |
| 40 | FW | ENG | Connor Wickham |

== Coaching staff ==
Until 22 April

| Position | Name |
|---|---|
| Manager | (Northern Ireland) Jim Magilton |
| Assistant manager | (Scotland) John Gorman |
| Goalkeeping coach | (England) James Hollman |
| Specialist Skills Coach | (England) Steve Foley |
| Fitness Coach | (England) Simon Thadani |
| Head physiotherapist | (England) Matt Byard |

From 22 April:

| Position | Name |
|---|---|
| Manager | (Republic of Ireland) Roy Keane |
| Assistant manager | (England) Tony Loughlan |
| Goalkeeping coach | (England) James Hollman |
| Specialist Skills Coach | (England) Steve Foley |
| Fitness Coach | (England) Simon Thadani |
| Head physiotherapist | (England) Matt Byard |

== Pre-season ==
Ipswich's preparations for the 2008–09 season included a pre-season training camp in Northern Ireland, including friendlies against Belfast based sides Cliftonville, Donegal Celtic and Glentoran.

=== Legend ===
| Win | Draw | Loss |

| Date | Opponent | Venue | Result | Attendance | Scorers |
|---|---|---|---|---|---|
| 9 July 2008 | Bury Town | A | 3–0 | Unknown | Bowditch, Peters, Upson |
| 11 July 2008 | Brentford | A | 2–0 | Unknown | Balkestein, Haynes |
| 14 July 2008 | Cliftonville | A | 7–0 | Unknown | Roberts, Lee, Haynes, Peters, Quinn (2), Wright |
| 17 July 2008 | Donegal Celtic | A | 4–1 | Unknown | Munster (o.g.), Garvan, Quinn (2) |
| 19 July 2008 | Glentoran | A | 3–1 | 3,262 | Lee, Couñago, Roberts (pen) |
| 23 July 2008 | Gillingham | A | 1–1 | 1,374 | Miller (pen) |
| 26 July 2008 | West Bromwich Albion | H | 2–1 | 7,189 | Miller (pen), Lisbie |
| 29 July 2008 | Brighton & Hove Albion | A | 3–2 | Unknown | Lisbie, Miller (pen) (2) |
| 4 August 2008 | West Ham United | H | 3–5 | 17,223 | Šumulikoski, Garvan, Lee |

== Competitions ==
=== Football League Championship ===
==== League table ====
| Pos | Team | Pld | W | D | L | GF | GA | GD | Pts |
|---|---|---|---|---|---|---|---|---|---|
| 7 | Cardiff City | 46 | 19 | 17 | 10 | 65 | 53 | +12 | 74 |
| 8 | Swansea City | 46 | 16 | 20 | 10 | 63 | 50 | +13 | 68 |
| 9 | Ipswich Town | 46 | 17 | 15 | 14 | 62 | 53 | +9 | 66 |
| 10 | Bristol City | 46 | 15 | 16 | 15 | 54 | 54 | 0 | 61 |
| 11 | Queens Park Rangers | 46 | 15 | 16 | 15 | 42 | 44 | −2 | 61 |

Updated to match(es) played on 3 May 2009. Source: The Football League
Rules for classification: 1) points; 2) goal difference; 3) number of goals scored.

==== Legend ====
| Win | Draw | Loss |

Ipswich Town's score comes first

==== Matches ====
| Date | Opponent | Venue | Result | Attendance | Scorers |
|---|---|---|---|---|---|
| 9 August 2008 | Preston North End | H | 1–2 | 22,307 | Lisbie |
| 16 August 2008 | Burnley | A | 3–0 | 11,312 | Trotter, Lisbie, Jordan (o.g.) |
| 23 August 2008 | Wolverhampton Wanderers | H | 0–2 | 21,483 | |
| 30 August 2008 | Watford | A | 1–2 | 16,345 | Couñago |
| 13 September 2008 | Reading | H | 2–0 | 21,366 | Stead, Walters |
| 17 September 2008 | Southampton | A | 2–2 | 14,916 | Garvan, Quinn |
| 20 September 2008 | Sheffield Wednesday | A | 0–0 | 17,198 | |
| 27 September 2008 | Crystal Palace | H | 1–1 | 19,032 | Stead |
| 30 September 2008 | Barnsley | H | 3–0 | 18,177 | Stead, Garvan, Campo |
| 4 October 2008 | Charlton Athletic | A | 1–2 | 20,643 | Cranie (o.g.) |
| 18 October 2008 | Swansea City | H | 2–2 | 20,026 | Couñago (2) |
| 21 October 2008 | Nottingham Forest | A | 1–1 | 19,455 | Miller (pen) |
| 25 October 2008 | Plymouth Argyle | A | 3–1 | 12,294 | Garvan (2), Lisbie |
| 28 October 2008 | Charlton Athletic | H | 1–1 | 20,352 | Garvan |
| 1 November 2008 | Queens Park Rangers | H | 2–0 | 20,966 | Stead (2) |
| 8 November 2008 | Blackpool | A | 1–0 | 7,349 | David Norris |
| 15 November 2008 | Doncaster Rovers | A | 0–1 | 10,823 | |
| 22 November 2008 | Derby County | H | 2–0 | 20,239 | Couñago, Walters |
| 25 November 2008 | Birmingham City | A | 1–2 | 15,689 | Bruce |
| 29 November 2008 | Sheffield United | H | 1–1 | 19,785 | Miller (pen) |
| 7 December 2008 | Norwich City | A | 0–2 | 25,472 | |
| 10 December 2008 | Bristol City | H | 3–1 | 17,749 | Walters, Couñago, Fontaine (o.g.) |
| 13 December 2008 | Cardiff City | H | 1–2 | 19,665 | Stead |
| 20 December 2008 | Coventry City | A | 2–2 | 15,598 | Lisbie (2) |
| 26 December 2008 | Birmingham City | H | 0–1 | 23,536 | |
| 28 December 2008 | Derby County | A | 1–0 | 28,358 | Walters |
| 10 January 2009 | Sheffield Wednesday | H | 1–1 | 22,213 | Couñago |
| 17 January 2009 | Crystal Palace | A | 4–1 | 15,348 | Garvan, David Norris, Lisbie, Hill (o.g.) |
| 27 January 2009 | Barnsley | A | 2–1 | 11,183 | Stead (2) |
| 31 January 2009 | Plymouth Argyle | H | 0–0 | 20,333 | |
| 7 February 2009 | Swansea City | A | 0–3 | 14,020 | |
| 14 February 2009 | Blackpool | H | 1–1 | 19,299 | Miller |
| 18 February 2009 | Nottingham Forest | H | 2–1 | 19,930 | Perch (o.g.), Wright |
| 21 February 2009 | Queens Park Rangers | A | 3–1 | 13,904 | Stead, Couñago, Walters |
| 28 February 2009 | Preston North End | A | 2–3 | 12,709 | Miller(2) |
| 3 March 2009 | Southampton | H | 0–3 | 20,040 | |
| 10 March 2009 | Wolverhampton Wanderers | A | 0–0 | 22,227 | |
| 14 March 2009 | Reading | A | 1–0 | 20,592 | Stead |
| 17 March 2009 | Burnley | H | 1–1 | 18,745 | dos Santos |
| 21 March 2009 | Watford | H | 0–0 | 21,434 | |
| 4 April 2009 | Sheffield United | A | 0–2 | 25,315 | |
| 11 April 2009 | Doncaster Rovers | H | 1–3 | 19,918 | Garvan |
| 13 April 2009 | Bristol City | A | 1–1 | 16,430 | dos Santos (pen) |
| 19 April 2009 | Norwich City | H | 3–2 | 28,274 | Quinn, dos Santos (pen), Stead |
| 25 April 2009 | Cardiff City | A | 3–0 | 19,129 | Couñago, Wright, Stead |
| 3 May 2009 | Coventry City | H | 2–1 | 27,225 | dos Santos, Couñago |

=== FA Cup ===
| Round | Date | Opponent | Venue | Result | Attendance | Goalscorers |
|---|---|---|---|---|---|---|
| R3 | 3 January 2009 | Chesterfield | H | 3–0 | 12,524 | Walters (pen), Couñago, Stead |
| R4 | 24 January 2009 | Chelsea | A | 1–3 | 41,137 | Bruce |

=== League Cup ===
| Round | Date | Opponent | Venue | Result | Attendance | Goalscorers |
|---|---|---|---|---|---|---|
| R1 | 12 August 2008 | Leyton Orient | H | 4–1 | 10,477 | Haynes (2), Miller, Lee |
| R2 | 26 August 2008 | Colchester United | H | 2–1 | 17,084 | Couñago, Lisbie |
| R3 | 24 September 2008 | Wigan Athletic | H | 1–4 | 13,803 | Walters |

== Transfers ==
=== Transfers in ===
| Date | Pos | Name | From | Fee | Ref |
|---|---|---|---|---|---|
| 16 June 2008 | DF | (Netherlands) Pim Balkestein | (Netherlands) Heerenveen | Undisclosed | |
| 18 June 2008 | DF | (Northern Ireland) Gareth McAuley | (England) Leicester City | Undisclosed | |
| 30 June 2008 | FW | (Jamaica) Kevin Lisbie | (England) Colchester United | £600,000 | |
| 21 July 2008 | GK | (England) Richard Wright | (England) West Ham United | Undisclosed | |
| 11 August 2008 | DF | (Spain) Iván Campo | (England) Bolton Wanderers | Free transfer | |
| 14 August 2008 | DF | (Wales) Ben Thatcher | (England) Charlton Athletic | Free transfer | |
| 15 September 2008 | FW | (England) Jon Stead | (England) Sheffield United | Undisclosed | |
| 29 January 2009 | MF | (Argentina) Luciano Civelli | (Argentina) Club Atlético Banfield | £1,000,000 | |

=== Loans in ===
| Date from | Pos | Name | From | Date until | Ref |
|---|---|---|---|---|---|
| 28 August 2008 | DF | (Germany) Moritz Volz | (England) Fulham | 30 June 2009 | |
| 1 September 2008 | FW | (England) Jon Stead | (England) Sheffield United | 15 September 2008 | |
| 11 November 2008 | MF | (England) Darren Ambrose | (England) Charlton Athletic | 2 January 2009 | |
| 13 March 2009 | FW | (Mexico) Giovani dos Santos | (England) Tottenham Hotspur | 30 June 2009 | |
| 17 March 2009 | GK | (Poland) Bartosz Białkowski | (England) Southampton | 30 June 2009 | |

=== Transfers out ===
| Date | Pos | Name | To | Fee | Ref |
|---|---|---|---|---|---|
| 27 June 2008 | MF | (Wales) Gavin Williams | (England) Bristol City | Undisclosed | |
| 1 July 2008 | DF | (Netherlands) Fabian Wilnis | (England) Grays Athletic | Free transfer | |
| 1 July 2008 | DF | (Canada) Jason de Vos | Retired | | |
| 1 July 2008 | MF | (France) Sylvain Legwinski | Free agent | Released | |
| 1 July 2008 | DF | (Spain) Sito | (Spain) UD Salamanca | Free transfer | |
| 1 July 2008 | GK | (England) Nick Pope | (England) Bury Town | Free transfer | |
| 1 July 2008 | GK | (Republic of Ireland) Nick Colgan | (England) Sunderland | Free transfer | |
| 1 July 2008 | DF | (Republic of Ireland) Michael Synnott | Free agent | Released | |
| 29 July 2008 | MF | (England) Gary Roberts | (England) Huddersfield Town | £250,000 | |
| 30 August 2008 | FW | (Republic of Ireland) Alan Lee | (England) Crystal Palace | Undisclosed | |
| 2 February 2009 | DF | (England) Richard Naylor | (England) Leeds United | Free transfer | |

=== Loans out ===
| Date from | Pos | Name | From | Date until | Ref |
|---|---|---|---|---|---|
| 1 August 2008 | MF | (England) Matt Richards | (England) Brighton & Hove Albion | 1 January 2009 | |
| 8 August 2008 | DF | (England) Dan Harding | (England) Southend United | 1 January 2009 | |
| 29 August 2008 | DF | (Northern Ireland) Chris Casement | (Scotland) Hamilton Academical | 1 January 2009 | |
| 1 September 2008 | MF | (England) Ed Upson | (England) Stevenage Borough | 1 January 2009 | |
| 12 September 2008 | FW | (England) Jordan Rhodes | (England) Rochdale | 1 January 2009 | |
| 18 September 2008 | MF | (England) Liam Trotter | (England) Grimsby Town | 1 January 2009 | |
| 31 October 2008 | FW | (England) Dean Bowditch | (England) Brentford | 1 January 2009 | |
| 27 November 2008 | DF | (England) Kurt Robinson | (England) Northampton Town | 27 December 2008 | |
| 7 January 2009 | DF | (Northern Ireland) Chris Casement | (England) Wycombe Wanderers | 7 February 2009 | |
| 8 January 2009 | DF | (England) Kurt Robinson | (England) Rushden & Diamonds | 8 February 2009 | |
| 22 January 2009 | MF | (Canada) Jaime Peters | (England) Gillingham | 22 February 2009 | |
| 23 January 2009 | FW | (England) Jordan Rhodes | (England) Brentford | 23 February 2009 | |
| 29 January 2009 | DF | (England) Dan Harding | (England) Reading | 30 June 2009 | |
| 1 February 2009 | MF | (England) Jai Reason | (England) Cambridge United | 30 June 2009 | |
| 23 February 2009 | MF | (England) Liam Trotter | (England) Scunthorpe United | 30 June 2009 | |

== Squad statistics ==
All statistics updated as of end of season

=== Appearances and goals ===
| No. | Pos | Nat | Player | Total | | Championship | | FA Cup | | League Cup | |
| No. | Pos | Nat | Player | Apps | Goals | Apps | Goals | Apps | Goals | Apps | Goals |
Goalkeepers
| 1 | GK | (England) ENG | Richard Wright | 50 | 0 | 46 | 0 | 2 | 0 | 2 | 0 |
| 27 | GK | (Republic of Ireland) IRL | Shane Supple | 1 | 0 | 0 | 0 | 0 | 0 | 1 | 0 |
Defenders
| 2 | DF | (England) ENG | David Wright | 36 | 1 | 34 | 1 | 2 | 0 | 0 | 0 |
| 4 | DF | (Northern Ireland) NIR | Gareth McAuley | 39 | 0 | 35 | 0 | 2 | 0 | 2 | 0 |
| 5 | DF | (Republic of Ireland) IRL | Alex Bruce | 29 | 2 | 25 | 1 | 1+1 | 1 | 2 | 0 |
| 15 | DF | (Netherlands) NED | Pim Balkestein | 23 | 0 | 15+5 | 0 | 1 | 0 | 1+1 | 0 |
| 16 | DF | (Northern Ireland) NIR | Chris Casement | 2 | 0 | 0 | 0 | 0 | 0 | 2 | 0 |
| 21 | DF | (Spain) ESP | Iván Campo | 20 | 1 | 14+3 | 1 | 1 | 0 | 2 | 0 |
| 22 | DF | (Germany) GER | Moritz Volz | 23 | 0 | 20+2 | 0 | 0 | 0 | 1 | 0 |
| 33 | DF | (Wales) WAL | Ben Thatcher | 23 | 0 | 20 | 0 | 1 | 0 | 2 | 0 |
| 35 | DF | (England) ENG | Tommy Smith | 2 | 0 | 2 | 0 | 0 | 0 | 0 | 0 |
Midfielders
| 7 | MF | (Republic of Ireland) IRL | Owen Garvan | 39 | 7 | 22+15 | 7 | 1 | 0 | 0+1 | 0 |
| 8 | MF | (England) ENG | Tommy Miller | 37 | 6 | 26+6 | 5 | 2 | 0 | 2+1 | 1 |
| 10 | MF | (England) ENG | David Norris | 41 | 3 | 35+2 | 3 | 2 | 0 | 1+1 | 0 |
| 12 | MF | (Canada) CAN | Jamie Peters | 3 | 0 | 2+1 | 0 | 0 | 0 | 0 | 0 |
| 13 | MF | (Argentina) ARG | Luciano Civelli | 8 | 0 | 8 | 0 | 0 | 0 | 0 | 0 |
| 25 | MF | (Republic of Ireland) IRL | Alan Quinn | 39 | 2 | 28+6 | 2 | 1+1 | 0 | 3 | 0 |
| 26 | MF | (North Macedonia) MKD | Veliče Šumulikoski | 27 | 0 | 22+4 | 0 | 1 | 0 | 0 | 0 |
| 30 | MF | (England) ENG | Matt Richards | 1 | 0 | 1 | 0 | 0 | 0 | 0 | 0 |
| 36 | MF | (England) ENG | Liam Trotter | 5 | 1 | 2+1 | 1 | 0 | 0 | 2 | 0 |
Forwards
| 9 | FW | (Spain) ESP | Pablo Couñago | 47 | 11 | 26+18 | 9 | 2 | 1 | 1 | 1 |
| 11 | FW | (Jamaica) JAM | Kevin Lisbie | 45 | 7 | 24+17 | 6 | 0+1 | 0 | 2+1 | 1 |
| 14 | FW | (England) ENG | Jon Stead | 41 | 13 | 26+13 | 12 | 0+2 | 1 | 0 | 0 |
| 17 | FW | (England) ENG | Dean Bowditch | 2 | 0 | 0+1 | 0 | 0 | 0 | 0+1 | 0 |
| 18 | FW | (England) ENG | Danny Haynes | 29 | 2 | 8+16 | 0 | 1+1 | 0 | 1+2 | 2 |
| 19 | FW | (Republic of Ireland) IRL | Jonathan Walters | 41 | 7 | 30+6 | 5 | 2 | 1 | 3 | 1 |
| 20 | FW | (Mexico) MEX | Giovani dos Santos | 8 | 4 | 6+2 | 4 | 0 | 0 | 0 | 0 |
| 38 | FW | (England) ENG | Jordan Rhodes | 2 | 0 | 0+2 | 0 | 0 | 0 | 0 | 0 |
| 40 | FW | (England) ENG | Connor Wickham | 2 | 0 | 0+2 | 0 | 0 | 0 | 0 | 0 |
Players transferred out during the season
| 6 | DF | (England) ENG | Richard Naylor | 25 | 0 | 20+3 | 0 | 0 | 0 | 2 | 0 |
| 14 | FW | (Republic of Ireland) IRL | Alan Lee | 4 | 1 | 2+1 | 0 | 0 | 0 | 1 | 1 |
| 20 | MF | (England) ENG | Darren Ambrose | 9 | 0 | 6+3 | 0 | 0 | 0 | 0 | 0 |
| 23 | DF | (England) ENG | Dan Harding | 1 | 0 | 1 | 0 | 0 | 0 | 0 | 0 |

Last updated: end of season
Source: Competitions

=== Goalscorers ===
| No. | Pos | Nat | Player | Championship | FA Cup | League Cup | Total |
|---|---|---|---|---|---|---|---|
| 14 | FW | (England) | Jon Stead | 12 | 1 | 0 | 13 |
| 9 | FW | (Spain) | Pablo Couñago | 9 | 1 | 1 | 11 |
| 7 | MF | (Republic of Ireland) | Owen Garvan | 7 | 0 | 0 | 7 |
| 11 | FW | (Jamaica) | Kevin Lisbie | 6 | 0 | 1 | 7 |
| 19 | FW | (Republic of Ireland) | Jonathan Walters | 5 | 1 | 1 | 7 |
| 8 | MF | (England) | Tommy Miller | 5 | 0 | 1 | 6 |
| 20 | FW | (Mexico) | Giovani dos Santos | 4 | 0 | 0 | 4 |
| 10 | MF | (England) | David Norris | 3 | 0 | 0 | 3 |
| 5 | DF | (Republic of Ireland) | Alex Bruce | 1 | 1 | 0 | 2 |
| 18 | FW | (England) | Danny Haynes | 0 | 0 | 2 | 2 |
| 25 | MF | (Republic of Ireland) | Alan Quinn | 2 | 0 | 0 | 2 |
| 2 | DF | (England) | David Wright | 1 | 0 | 0 | 1 |
| 14 | FW | (Republic of Ireland) | Alan Lee | 0 | 0 | 1 | 1 |
| 21 | DF | (Spain) | Iván Campo | 1 | 0 | 0 | 1 |
| 36 | MF | (England) | Liam Trotter | 1 | 0 | 0 | 1 |
| Own goal | | | | 5 | 0 | 0 | 5 |
| Total | | | | 62 | 4 | 7 | 73 |

=== Clean sheets ===
| Number | Nation | Name | Championship | FA Cup | League Cup | Total |
|---|---|---|---|---|---|---|
| 1 | (England) | Richard Wright | 13 | 1 | 0 | 14 |
| Total | | | 13 | 1 | 0 | 14 |

=== Disciplinary record ===
| No. | Pos. | Name | Championship | | FA Cup | | League Cup | | Total | |
| No. | Pos. | Name | Yellow card | Red card | Yellow card | Red card | Yellow card | Red card | Yellow card | Red card |
|---|---|---|---|---|---|---|---|---|---|---|
| 2 | DF | (England) David Wright | 3 | 0 | 0 | 0 | 0 | 0 | 3 | 0 |
| 4 | DF | (Northern Ireland) Gareth McAuley | 5 | 0 | 0 | 0 | 0 | 0 | 5 | 0 |
| 5 | DF | (Republic of Ireland) Alex Bruce | 3 | 2 | 1 | 0 | 1 | 0 | 5 | 2 |
| 6 | DF | (England) Richard Naylor | 3 | 0 | 0 | 0 | 0 | 0 | 3 | 0 |
| 7 | MF | (Republic of Ireland) Owen Garvan | 6 | 0 | 1 | 0 | 0 | 0 | 7 | 0 |
| 8 | MF | (England) Tommy Miller | 4 | 0 | 0 | 0 | 0 | 0 | 4 | 0 |
| 9 | FW | (Spain) Pablo Couñago | 5 | 0 | 0 | 0 | 0 | 0 | 5 | 0 |
| 10 | MF | (England) David Norris | 6 | 1 | 1 | 0 | 1 | 0 | 8 | 1 |
| 14 | FW | (England) Jon Stead | 3 | 0 | 0 | 0 | 0 | 0 | 3 | 0 |
| 15 | DF | (Netherlands) Pim Balkestein | 3 | 0 | 0 | 0 | 0 | 0 | 3 | 0 |
| 16 | DF | (Northern Ireland) Chris Casement | 0 | 0 | 0 | 0 | 1 | 0 | 1 | 0 |
| 18 | FW | (England) Danny Haynes | 2 | 0 | 0 | 0 | 0 | 0 | 2 | 0 |
| 19 | FW | (Republic of Ireland) Jonathan Walters | 2 | 0 | 0 | 0 | 0 | 0 | 2 | 0 |
| 20 | FW | (Mexico) Giovani dos Santos | 1 | 0 | 0 | 0 | 0 | 0 | 1 | 0 |
| 21 | DF | (Spain) Iván Campo | 5 | 0 | 0 | 0 | 0 | 0 | 5 | 0 |
| 22 | DF | (Germany) Moritz Volz | 6 | 0 | 0 | 0 | 1 | 0 | 7 | 0 |
| 25 | MF | (Republic of Ireland) Alan Quinn | 6 | 0 | 0 | 0 | 1 | 0 | 7 | 0 |
| 26 | MF | (North Macedonia) Veliče Šumulikoski | 4 | 0 | 1 | 0 | 0 | 0 | 5 | 0 |
| 33 | DF | (Wales) Ben Thatcher | 5 | 1 | 0 | 0 | 0 | 0 | 5 | 1 |
| Total | | | 72 | 4 | 4 | 0 | 5 | 0 | 81 | 4 |

== Awards ==
=== Player awards ===
| Award | Player | Ref |
|---|---|---|
| Player of the Year | (England) Richard Wright | |
| Players' Player of the Year | (England) Richard Wright | |
| Young Player of the Year | (England) Connor Wickham | |
| Goal of the Season | (Republic of Ireland) Jonathan Walters | |
