= James Krause =

James Krause may refer to:

- James Krause (fighter) (born 1986), American mixed martial artist
- James Krause (footballer) (born 1987), English footballer
