= 2006–07 Ipswich Town F.C. season =

Ipswich Town
2006–07 season
- Chairman: David Sheepshanks
- Manager: Jim Magilton
- Stadium: Portman Road
- Championship: 14th
- FA Cup: Fifth round
- League Cup: First round
- Top goalscorer: League: Alan Lee (16); All: Alan Lee (17)
- Highest home attendance: 28,355 (vs. Colchester United, 20 January 2007, Championship)
- Lowest home attendance: 11,732 (vs. Chester City, 16 January 2007, FA Cup)
- Average home league attendance: 22,890

The 2006–07 season was the 62nd full season of league football for Ipswich Town. The club played in the Football League Championship for the 2006–07 season, whilst also competing in the FA Cup and League Cup.

== Events ==
- 5 June 2006 - Jim Magilton replaces Joe Royle as manager.
- 19 November 2006 - Town defeat Norwich City 3–1 in the East Anglian derby, with Danny Haynes scoring two late goals.
- 28 April 2007 - Ipswich effectively relegate Leeds United with a draw at Elland Road. The game is stopped half a minute early because of crowd trouble, with the responsible fans removed from the ground. Referee Nigel Miller controversially brings the teams back out to end the game. Ipswich hold on to a draw and would have won the game had their goals not been ruled out for offside.

== Season summary ==
=== Pre-season ===
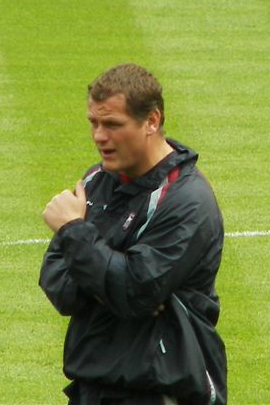
Jim Magilton was appointed Ipswich Town manager in June 2006

The 2006–07 season was a transitional season for Ipswich Town. Joe Royle left his position as manager and was replaced by Jim Magilton on 5 June 2006, who was making the move from player to manager. Magilton continued to be registered as a player at the club although he would only feature in the first-team in an emergency situation. Following his appointment he stated that he was intending to play in reserve team games to use his experience to help the club's young players develop. Bryan Klug was appointed as first-team coach alongside Magilton. He thanked Ipswich's fans for the positive reaction to his appointment once he had been revealed as the club's new manager.

"I have had a fantastic response from the fans and I would like to thank them for that.

"I've had a great rapport with the supporters of this club since I first came here as a player and have been lifted again by the support I have had since taking over as manager.

"I think in many ways the fans at the club are the most passionate in the Championship because they care so much about everything that happens here.

"This is a community and Ipswich Town Football Club is the focal point and the people of the town want the club to be successful.

"I want it to be successful as well, so do my coaching staff, and I can tell you that the players will be the same. We will be giving it everything to take this club forward."

Following his appointment as manager, Magilton named Canadian international centre-back Jason de Vos as Ipswich's new club captain. Magilton also appointed new members to his coaching and back-room staff. Steve Foley was appointed as a coach on 9 June, who had been appointed to work with both the academy and first-team, club physio Dave Williams was named the head of Ipswich's newly created sports science department.

Ipswich were still financially recovering from administration, with limited funds restricting the playing budget. Magilton's first signing as manager saw Alex Bruce arrive from Birmingham City on a free transfer on 2 August 2006. Ian Westlake was sold to Leeds United on 4 August for a reported fee of £400,000, potentially rising to £500,000 with add-ons, in a deal which also saw Dan Harding move in the other direction, signing a three-year deal with Ipswich. French midfielder Sylvain Legwinski also joined on a free transfer from Fulham on 31 August, signing a two-year contract with the club. Strikers Sam Parkin and Nicky Forster also departed for fees, joining Luton Town and Hull City respectively before the end of August. Magilton also utilized the loan market, with midfielders Simon Walton and Mark Noble joining on loan from Charlton Athletic and West Ham United respectively. Republic of Ireland striker Jon Macken also joined on loan until January from Crystal Palace.

=== August to December ===
The season began on the 5 August, with Magilton taking charge of his first game as Ipswich Town manager at home to Crystal Palace at Portman Road. Despite taking the lead through a first-half goal from the previous season's top scorer Nicky Forster, Ipswich suffered a 1–2 opening day defeat due to second-half goals from Jobi McAnuff and former Ipswich Town striker James Scowcroft. The tough start to the season continued for Magilton's Ipswich as they lost the following two games away to Wolverhampton Wanderers and Leicester City. A 0–0 draw with Hull City followed before Ipswich earned their first victory of the season, defeating Queens Park Rangers 3–1 away at Loftus Road, with goals from Simon Walton, Jason de Vos and Dean Bowditch. Following Magilton's first win as Ipswich manager, the team went on to win the following two games, with home victories over Southampton and Coventry City.

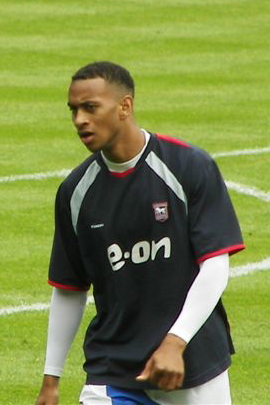
Danny Haynes scored twice for Ipswich Town in the 3–1 East Anglian derby victory on 19 November

The first three months of the season saw Ipswich pick up six wins, three draws and six losses from their opening fifteen league games. Whilst also exiting the league cup 2–4 on penalties at the first round stage to Peterborough United, following a 2–2 draw after extra time. On 29 October, Ipswich defeated Luton Town 5–0 at Portman Road, with Alan Lee scoring a Hat-trick, this was the team's largest winning margin of the season. The 19 November saw the first East Anglian derby of the season take place, with Ipswich facing local rivals Norwich City at Portman Road. Despite going behind in the 26th minute to a goal from Luke Chadwick, Sylvain Legwinski equalized for Ipswich in the 40th minute, leaving the game at 1–1 going into half-time. With the game tied at 1–1, Ipswich academy graduate Danny Haynes came on as a substitute for Billy Clarke in the 76th minute and scored within a minute of entering onto the pitch, putting Ipswich 2–1 ahead. Haynes scored again in the 90th minute with a curling shot from the edge of the 18 yard box that went in off the post. Ipswich defeated Norwich City 3–1 in the East Anglian Derby. After the match Magilton said of Haynes: "Danny Haynes will get hero status here and seems to enjoy local derbies. I felt it was time to put him on because the pitch was strength-sapping and Danny's pace will always cause problems against tired legs."

=== January transfer window ===
The January transfer window saw multiple new signings join the club. The first deal to take place was the permanent signing of midfielder Gary Roberts from Accrington Stanley, following a successful loan spell. Defender David Wright was signed from Wigan Athletic on 11 January for an undisclosed fee, whilst George O'Callaghan was also signed from League of Ireland side Cork City following a four-month spell of training with Ipswich. The club's final permanent deal of the January transfer window was the signing of Jonathan Walters from Chester City for a reported fee of £100,000.

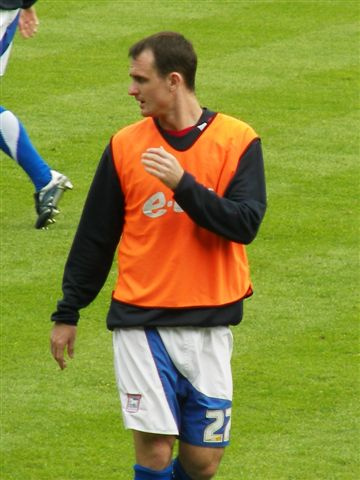
Former England international Francis Jeffers signed on loan for Ipswich in March

=== January to May ===
Ipswich's form had stuttered through to the end of December, however they started the new year with a 1–0 home win over Birmingham City at Portman Road, with Gavin Williams netting the winning goal in the 90th minute. Ipswich were drawn away to Chester City in the FA Cup third round on 6 January. The first tie ended in a 0–0 draw, resulting in a replay scheduled for the 16 January, which Ipswich won 1–0, with Matt Richards scoring the winning goal. On 20 January Ipswich defeated local rivals Colchester United 3–2, with goals from Alan Lee, Sylvain Legwinski and Danny Haynes. The second round of the FA Cup took place on 27 January, with Ipswich drawn at home to Swansea City. Alan Lee scored the only goal of the match, converting a penalty in the 64 minute to send Ipswich into the next round of the cup. Ipswich suffered from a poor run of form during February, with the team going on a four-game losing run throughout the month, whist also exiting the FA Cup due to a 0–1 away loss to Watford at Vicarage Road.

The team's form improved during the later stages of the season. On 6 March, Ipswich recorded a 5–2 away win over Hull City, the team's biggest away win of the season. On 7 April, Ipswich defeated Barnsley 5–1 at Portman Road, the third time in the season that they had scored five goals in a single game. Ipswich faced rivals Norwich City for the second East Anglian derby of the season on 22 April away at Carrow Road. The match ended in a 1–1 draw, with David Wright's second-half equalizer leveling the tie. The following match Ipswich faced Leeds United at Elland Road. The match ended in a 1–1 draw, a result which effectively relegated Leeds to League One. The game was stopped half a minute early because of crowd trouble, with the responsible fans removed from the ground. Referee Nigel Miller controversially brought the teams back out to end the game. Ipswich held on to draw the game and would have won the game had their goals not been ruled out for offside. Ipswich's final game of the season saw them host Cardiff City at Portman Road. Ipswich ended the season with a 3–1 victory following a goal from Francis Jeffers, and a brace from Jonathan Walters. Ipswich finished 14th in the Championship in the 2006–07 season. Irish striker Alan Lee finished the season as Ipswich's top goal-scorer with 17 goals in all competitions, 16 of which were scored in the league. French midfielder Sylvain Legwinski won both the club's Supporters' and Players' Player of the Year awards for the season, whilst Tommy Smith won the club's Academy Player of the Year award. Welshman Gavin Williams won the club's Goal of the Season award for his strike in the 1–0 home victory over Leeds United on 16 December.

== First-team squad ==
Squad at end of season

Note: Flags indicate national team as defined under FIFA eligibility rules; some limited exceptions apply. Players may hold more than one non-FIFA nationality.

No.	Pos.	Nation	Player
1	GK	IRL	Shane Supple
2	DF	NED	Fabian Wilnis
3	DF	ENG	Matt Richards
4	DF	CAN	Jason de Vos (captain)
5	DF	IRL	Alex Bruce
6	DF	ENG	Richard Naylor
7	MF	IRL	Owen Garvan
8	MF	FRA	Sylvain Legwinski
11	MF	WAL	Gavin Williams
12	MF	CAN	Jaime Peters
14	FW	IRL	Alan Lee

No.	Pos.	Nation	Player
15	DF	ESP	Sito
17	FW	ENG	Dean Bowditch
18	FW	ENG	Danny Haynes
19	FW	IRL	Jonathan Walters
20	DF	ENG	David Wright
21	MF	IRL	George O'Callaghan
23	DF	ENG	Dan Harding
24	FW	IRL	Billy Clarke
27	FW	ENG	Francis Jeffers (on loan from Blackburn Rovers)
33	MF	ENG	Gary Roberts
34	GK	WAL	Lewis Price

=== Left club during season ===
Note: Flags indicate national team as defined under FIFA eligibility rules; some limited exceptions apply. Players may hold more than one non-FIFA nationality.

No.	Pos.	Nation	Player
8	FW	ENG	Nicky Forster (to Hull City)
9	FW	ENG	Sam Parkin (to Luton Town)
10	MF	ENG	Darren Currie (on loan to Derby County)
19	DF	ENG	Aidan Collins (to Cambridge United)
20	MF	ENG	Mark Noble (on loan from West Ham United)

No.	Pos.	Nation	Player
21	MF	ENG	Simon Walton (on loan from Charlton Athletic)
27	FW	IRL	Jon Macken (on loan from Crystal Palace)
38	GK	CZE	Jaroslav Drobný (released)
39	DF	ENG	Matthew Bates (on loan from Middlesbrough)
40	GK	ENG	Mike Pollitt (on loan from Wigan Athletic)

=== Reserve squad ===
Note: Flags indicate national team as defined under FIFA eligibility rules; some limited exceptions apply. Players may hold more than one non-FIFA nationality.

No.	Pos.	Nation	Player
16	DF	NIR	Chris Casement
22	FW	ENG	Darryl Knights
25	GK	ENG	Andy Rhodes
26	DF	ENG	Scott Barron
28	MF	ENG	Martin Brittain
30	MF	ENG	Sammy Moore

No.	Pos.	Nation	Player
31	DF	IRL	Michael Synnott
32	DF	ENG	Ian Miller
35	DF	ENG	James Krause
36	MF	ENG	Liam Trotter
37	GK	ENG	Andrew Plummer
38	FW	ENG	Jordan Rhodes

== Coaching staff ==
Position	Name
Manager	(Northern Ireland) Jim Magilton
Assistant manager	(England) Bryan Klug
Goalkeeping coach	(England) Andy Rhodes
Specialist Skills Coach	(England) Steve Foley
Fitness Coach	(England) Simon Thadani
Head of Sports Science	(England) Dave Williams

== Pre-season ==
Preparations for the 2006–07 season included a pre-season tour of the Netherlands and Belgium, in which Ipswich played friendly matches against Dutch sides Willem II and Dordrecht, Zulte Waregem from Belgium and Italian side Lazio.

=== Legend ===
Win	Draw	Loss

Date	Opponent	Venue	Result	Attendance	Scorers
8 July 2006	Boston United	A	1–1	Unknown	Forster (pen)
12 July 2006	Galway United	A	2–0	Unknown	Forster, Sito
17 July 2006	Willem II	A	1–1	Unknown	Richards
19 July 2006	Zulte Waregem	A	1–1	Unknown	Westlake
21 July 2006	Dordrecht	A	1–1	Unknown	Naylor
29 July 2006	Lazio	H	0–2	10,365	

== Competitions ==
=== Football League Championship ===
==== League table ====
Pos	Team	Pld	W	D	L	GF	GA	GD	Pts
12	Crystal Palace	46	18	11	17	59	51	+8	65
13	Cardiff City	46	17	13	16	57	53	+4	64
14	Ipswich Town	46	18	8	20	64	59	+5	62
15	Burnley	46	15	12	19	52	49	+3	57
16	Norwich City	46	16	9	21	56	71	−15	57

Source: RSSSF
Rules for classification: In the Football League goals scored (F) takes precedence over goal difference (GD).

==== Legend ====
Win	Draw	Loss

Ipswich Town's score comes first

==== Matches ====
Date	Opponent	Venue	Result	Attendance	Scorers
5 August	Crystal Palace	H	1–2	25,413	Forster
8 August	Wolverhampton Wanderers	A	0–1	19,199	
12 August	Leicester City	A	1–3	18,820	Richards
19 August	Hull City	H	0–0	19,790	
25 August	QPR	A	3–1	10,918	Walton, de Vos, Bowditch
9 September	Southampton	H	2–1	21,422	Walton (pen), Clarke
12 September	Coventry City	H	2–1	19,465	Noble, Clarke
16 September	Birmingham City	A	2–2	20,841	Lee, Walton
23 September	Sunderland	H	3–1	23,311	Currie, Lee (2)
29 September	Colchester United	A	0–1	6,065	
14 October	West Bromwich Albion	H	1–5	22,581	Perry (o.g.)
17 October	Preston North End	H	2–3	19,337	Macken (pen), Lee
21 October	Southend United	A	3–1	11,415	Clarke, Legwinski, Lee
29 October	Luton Town	H	5–0	20,975	Legwinski, Peters, Lee (3, 1x pen.)
31 October	Plymouth Argyle	A	1–1	12,210	Legwinski
4 November	Burnley	A	0–1	11,709	
11 November	Sheffield Wednesday	H	0–2	21,830	
19 November	Norwich City	H	3–1	27,276	Legwinski, Haynes (2)
25 November	Barnsley	A	0–1	10,556	
29 November	Derby County	A	1–2	22,606	Roberts
2 December	Burnley	H	1–1	20,254	Lee
9 December	Cardiff City	A	2–2	16,015	Macken (2)
16 December	Leeds United	H	1–0	23,661	Williams
23 December	Stoke City	H	0–1	20,369	
26 December	Coventry City	A	2–1	22,154	Macken, Lee
30 December	West Bromwich Albion	A	0–2	20,328	
1 January	Birmingham City	H	1–0	22,436	Williams
13 January	Sunderland	A	0–1	27,604	
20 January	Colchester United	H	3–2	28,355	Lee (pen), Legwinski, Haynes
30 January	Stoke City	A	0–0	11,812	
3 February	Crystal Palace	A	0–2	17,090	
10 February	Leicester City	H	0–2	21,221	
20 February	Wolverhampton Wanderers	H	0–1	20,602	
24 February	Southampton	A	0–1	27,974	
3 March	QPR	H	2–1	21,412	Lee, Walters
6 March	Hull City	A	5–2	18,056	Jeffers, Peters, Lee, de Vos, Haynes
10 March	Southend United	H	0–2	24,051	
13 March	Preston North End	A	0–1	13,100	
17 March	Luton Town	A	2–0	8,880	Lee, Richards
31 March	Plymouth Argyle	H	3–0	21,078	Garvan, Lee, Haynes
7 April	Barnsley	H	5–1	20,585	Roberts, O'Callaghan, Haynes, Jeffers, Walters
9 April	Sheffield Wednesday	A	2–0	23,232	
14 April	Derby County	H	2–1	24,319	Haynes, Jeffers
22 April	Norwich City	A	1–1	25,476	Wright
28 April	Leeds United	A	1–1	31,269	Lee
6 May	Cardiff City	H	3–1	26,488	Jeffers, Walters (2)

=== FA Cup ===
Round	Date	Opponent	Venue	Result	Attendance	Goalscorers
R3	6 January	Chester City	A	0–0	4,330	
R3 Replay	16 January	Chester City	H	1–0	11,732	Richards
R4	27 January	Swansea City	H	1–0	16,635	Lee (pen)
R5	17 February	Watford	A	0–1	17,016	

=== League Cup ===
Round	Date	Opponent	Venue	Result	Attendance	Goalscorers
R1	22 August	Peterborough	A	2–2 (lost 2–4 on penalties after extra time)	4,792	de Vos, Clarke

== Transfers ==
=== Transfers in ===
Date	Pos	Name	From	Fee	Ref
2 August 2006	DF	(Republic of Ireland) Alex Bruce	(England) Birmingham City	Free transfer	
4 August 2006	DF	(England) Dan Harding	(England) Leeds United	Part-exchange	
21 August 2006	MF	(England) Martin Brittain	Free agent	Free transfer	
31 August 2006	MF	(France) Sylvain Legwinski	(England) Fulham	Free transfer	
18 September 2006	DF	(England) Ian Miller	(England) Bury Town	Free transfer	
27 October 2006	GK	(Czech Republic) Jaroslav Drobný	Free agent	Free transfer	
1 January 2007	MF	(England) Gary Roberts	(England) Accrington Stanley	Undisclosed	
11 January 2007	DF	(England) David Wright	(England) Wigan Athletic	Undisclosed	
17 January 2007	MF	(Republic of Ireland) George O'Callaghan	(Republic of Ireland) Cork City	Undisclosed	
19 January 2007	FW	(Republic of Ireland) Jonathan Walters	(England) Chester City	£250,000	

=== Loans in ===
Date from	Pos	Name	From	Date until	Ref
18 August 2006	MF	(England) Simon Walton	(England) Charlton Athletic	2 January 2007	
18 August 2006	MF	(England) Mark Noble	(England) West Ham United	16 November 2006	
31 August 2006	FW	(Republic of Ireland) Jon Macken	(England) Crystal Palace	8 January 2007	
17 October 2006	MF	(England) Gary Roberts	(England) Accrington Stanley	31 December 2006	
13 November 2006	DF	(England) Matthew Bates	(England) Middlesbrough	13 December 2006	
15 November 2006	GK	(England) Mike Pollitt	(England) Wigan Athletic	23 November 2006	
2 March 2007	FW	(England) Francis Jeffers	(England) Blackburn Rovers	30 May 2007	

=== Transfers out ===
Date	Pos	Name	To	Fee	Ref
15 May 2006	MF	(Northern Ireland) Kevin Horlock	(England) Doncaster Rovers	Free transfer	
22 May 2006	MF	(England) Dean McDonald	(England) Gillingham	Free transfer	
30 May 2006	MF	(Republic of Ireland) Cathal Lordan	(Republic of Ireland) Cork City	Free transfer	
5 June 2006	MF	(Northern Ireland) Jim Magilton	Retired		
1 July 2006	DF	(Republic of Ireland) Gerard Nash	Retired		
1 July 2006	FW	(Norway) Vemund Brekke Skard	Free agent	Released	
1 July 2006	FW	(England) Charlie Sheringham	(England) Crystal Palace	Free transfer	
4 August 2006	MF	(England) Ian Westlake	(England) Leeds United	£400,000	
25 August 2006	FW	(England) Sam Parkin	(England) Luton Town	£340,000	
31 August 2006	FW	(England) Nicky Forster	(England) Hull City	£250,000	
30 November 2006	GK	(Czech Republic) Jaroslav Drobný	Free agent	Released	
31 January 2007	DF	(England) Aidan Collins	(England) Cambridge United	Free transfer	

=== Loans out ===
Date from	Pos	Name	To	Date until	Ref
30 August 2006	MF	(England) Liam Trotter	(England) Millwall	30 November 2006	
25 September 2006	FW	(England) Danny Haynes	(England) Millwall	23 October 2006	
30 October 2006	MF	(England) Martin Brittain	(England) Yeovil Town	2 January 2007	
31 October 2006	FW	(England) Dean Bowditch	(England) Brighton & Hove Albion	31 December 2006	
3 November 2006	DF	(England) Ian Miller	(England) Boston United	14 January 2007	
21 November 2006	DF	(England) James Krause	(England) Carlisle United	30 June 2007	
22 November 2006	MF	(England) Darren Currie	(England) Coventry City	2 January 2007	
31 January 2007	MF	(England) Martin Brittain	(England) Yeovil Town	19 May 2007	
7 February 2007	DF	(England) Scott Barron	(Wales) Wrexham	8 March 2007	
8 February 2007	DF	(England) Ian Miller	(England) Darlington	18 March 2007	
20 February 2007	FW	(England) Darryl Knights	(England) Yeovil Town	28 May 2007	
15 March 2007	MF	(England) Darren Currie	(England) Derby County	16 May 2007	
27 March 2007	DF	(Northern Ireland) Chris Casement	(England) Millwall	22 April 2007	

Total transfer fees paid: ▼£250,000
Total transfer fees received: ▲£990,000

Does not take into account undisclosed fees.

== Squad statistics ==
All statistics updated as of end of season

=== Appearances and goals ===
No.	Pos	Nat	Player	Total		Championship		FA Cup		League Cup	
No.	Pos	Nat	Player	Apps	Goals	Apps	Goals	Apps	Goals	Apps	Goals
Goalkeepers
1	GK	(Republic of Ireland) IRL	Shane Supple	13	0	11+1	0	1	0	0	0
34	GK	(Wales) WAL	Lewis Price	38	0	34	0	3	0	1	0
Defenders
2	DF	(Netherlands) NED	Fabian Wilnis	24	0	19+2	0	2	0	1	0
3	DF	(England) ENG	Matt Richards	32	3	20+8	2	2+1	1	1	0
4	DF	(Canada) CAN	Jason de Vos	41	3	39	2	1	0	1	1
5	DF	(Republic of Ireland) IRL	Alex Bruce	45	0	40+1	0	3	0	1	0
6	DF	(England) ENG	Richard Naylor	29	0	21+4	0	3	0	1	0
15	DF	(Spain) ESP	Sito	9	0	6+2	0	1	0	0	0
16	DF	(Northern Ireland) NIR	Chris Casement	4	0	0	0	1+2	0	0+1	0
20	DF	(England) ENG	David Wright	20	1	19	1	1	0	0	0
23	DF	(England) ENG	Dan Harding	47	0	40+2	0	4	0	1	0
32	DF	(England) ENG	Ian Miller	1	0	0+1	0	0	0	0	0
Midfielders
7	MF	(Republic of Ireland) IRL	Owen Garvan	29	1	24+3	1	1+1	0	0	0
8	MF	(France) FRA	Sylvain Legwinski	36	5	31+1	5	4	0	0	0
10	MF	(England) ENG	Darren Currie	14	1	6+7	1	0	0	1	0
11	MF	(Wales) WAL	Gavin Williams	32	2	25+4	2	2+1	0	0	0
12	MF	(Canada) CAN	Jaime Peters	26	2	20+3	2	3	0	0	0
21	MF	(Republic of Ireland) IRL	George O'Callaghan	12	1	3+8	1	1	0	0	0
28	MF	(England) ENG	Martin Brittain	1	0	0	0	0	0	0+1	0
30	MF	(England) ENG	Sammy Moore	1	0	0+1	0	0	0	0	0
33	MF	(England) ENG	Gary Roberts	37	2	30+3	2	4	0	0	0
36	MF	(England) ENG	Liam Trotter	1	0	0	0	0+1	0	0	0
Forwards
14	FW	(Republic of Ireland) IRL	Alan Lee	44	17	38+3	16	3	1	0	0
17	FW	(England) ENG	Dean Bowditch	10	1	3+6	1	0	0	1	0
18	FW	(England) ENG	Danny Haynes	36	7	4+27	7	2+2	0	1	0
19	FW	(Republic of Ireland) IRL	Jonathan Walters	16	4	11+5	4	0	0	0	0
24	FW	(Republic of Ireland) IRL	Billy Clarke	32	4	10+17	3	2+2	0	0+1	1
27	FW	(England) ENG	Francis Jeffers	9	4	7+2	4	0	0	0	0
Players transferred out during the season
8	FW	(England) ENG	Nicky Forster	5	1	4	1	0	0	1	0
9	FW	(England) ENG	Sam Parkin	2	0	0+2	0	0	0	0	0
20	MF	(England) ENG	Mark Noble	13	1	12+1	1	0	0	0	0
21	MF	(England) ENG	Simon Walton	19	3	13+6	3	0	0	0	0
27	FW	(Republic of Ireland) IRL	Jon Macken	14	4	13+1	4	0	0	0	0
39	DF	(England) ENG	Matthew Bates	2	0	2	0	0	0	0	0
40	GK	(England) ENG	Mike Pollitt	1	0	1	0	0	0	0	0

Last updated: end of season
Source: Competitions

=== Goalscorers ===
No.	Pos	Nat	Player	Championship	FA Cup	League Cup	Total
14	FW	(Republic of Ireland)	Alan Lee	16	1	0	17
18	FW	(England)	Danny Haynes	7	0	0	7
8	MF	(France)	Sylvain Legwinski	5	0	0	5
19	FW	(Republic of Ireland)	Jonathan Walters	4	0	0	4
24	FW	(Republic of Ireland)	Billy Clarke	3	0	1	4
27	FW	(England)	Francis Jeffers	4	0	0	4
27	FW	(Republic of Ireland)	Jon Macken	4	0	0	4
3	DF	(England)	Matt Richards	2	1	0	3
4	DF	(Canada)	Jason de Vos	2	0	1	3
11	MF	(Wales)	Gavin Williams	2	0	0	2
12	MF	(Canada)	Jamie Peters	2	0	0	2
33	MF	(England)	Gary Roberts	2	0	0	2
7	MF	(Republic of Ireland)	Owen Garvan	1	0	0	1
8	FW	(England)	Nicky Forster	1	0	0	1
10	MF	(England)	Darren Currie	1	0	0	1
17	FW	(England)	Dean Bowditch	1	0	0	1
20	DF	(England)	David Wright	1	0	0	1
20	MF	(England)	Mark Noble	1	0	0	1
21	MF	(Republic of Ireland)	George O'Callaghan	1	0	0	1
Own goal				1	0	0	1
Total				61	2	2	65

=== Clean sheets ===
No.	Nat	Player	Championship	FA Cup	League Cup	Total
34	(Wales)	Lewis Price	7	2	0	9
1	(Republic of Ireland)	Shane Supple	1	1	0	2
Total			8	3	0	11

=== Disciplinary record ===
No.	Pos.	Name	Championship		FA Cup		League Cup		Total	
No.	Pos.	Name	Yellow card	Red card	Yellow card	Red card	Yellow card	Red card	Yellow card	Red card
2	DF	(Netherlands) Fabian Wilnis	1	1	0	0	0	0	1	1
4	DF	(Canada) Jason de Vos	3	0	0	0	0	0	3	0
5	DF	(Republic of Ireland) Alex Bruce	10	0	1	0	1	0	12	0
6	DF	(England) Richard Naylor	3	0	0	0	1	0	4	0
7	MF	(Republic of Ireland) Owen Garvan	6	1	0	0	0	0	6	1
8	MF	(France) Sylvain Legwinski	6	0	0	0	0	0	6	0
10	MF	(England) Darren Currie	2	0	0	0	0	0	2	0
11	MF	(Wales) Gavin Williams	9	0	0	0	0	0	9	0
14	FW	(Republic of Ireland) Alan Lee	9	1	1	0	0	0	10	1
15	DF	(Spain) Sito	2	0	1	0	0	0	3	0
16	DF	(Northern Ireland) Chris Casement	0	0	0	0	1	0	1	0
18	FW	(England) Danny Haynes	2	0	0	0	1	0	3	0
20	DF	(England) David Wright	1	1	0	0	0	0	1	1
20	MF	(England) Mark Noble	5	0	0	0	0	0	5	0
21	MF	(England) Simon Walton	6	1	0	0	0	0	6	1
21	MF	(Republic of Ireland) George O'Callaghan	2	0	0	0	0	0	2	0
23	DF	(England) Dan Harding	10	0	1	0	0	0	11	0
24	FW	(Republic of Ireland) Billy Clarke	10	0	1	0	0	0	11	0
27	FW	(Republic of Ireland) Jon Macken	1	0	0	0	0	0	1	0
27	FW	(England) Francis Jeffers	1	0	0	0	0	0	1	0
32	DF	(England) Ian Miller	1	0	0	0	0	0	1	0
33	MF	(England) Gary Roberts	6	0	1	0	0	0	7	0
Total			96	5	6	0	4	0	106	5

=== Starting 11 ===
Considering starts in all competitions

No.	Pos.	Nat.	Name	MS	Notes
34	GK	(Wales)	Lewis Price	38	
2	RB	(Netherlands)	Fabian Wilnis	22	David Wright has 20 starts
4	CB	(Canada)	Jason de Vos	41	
5	CB	(Republic of Ireland)	Alex Bruce	44	
23	LB	(England)	Dan Harding	45	
33	RM	(England)	Gary Roberts	34	
11	CM	(Wales)	Gavin Williams	27	Owen Garvan has 25 starts
8	CM	(France)	Sylvain Legwinski	35	
3	LM	(England)	Matt Richards	23	Jaime Peters has 23 starts
27	CF	(Republic of Ireland)	Jon Macken	13	Billy Clarke has 12 starts
14	CF	(Republic of Ireland)	Alan Lee	41	

4–4–2 Formation

== Season statistics ==
=== Attendance ===
- Highest: 28,355 (vs. Colchester United, 20 January, Championship)
- Lowest: 19,337 (vs. Preston North End, 19 October, Championship)
- Cumulative league attendance - home: 516,231 - away: 114,260 - total: 630,491
- Average attendance (league): 22,890
- Ratio: Average attendance to stadium capacity: 71%

=== Matches ===
- Biggest win: 5–0 (vs. Luton Town, 29 October, home, Championship)
- Heaviest defeat: 1–5 (vs. West Bromwich Albion, 14 October, home, Championship)
- Longest winning run (league games): 3 (25 August – 12 September), (17 March – 7 April)
- Longest losing run (league games): 3 (6 August – 12 August), (29 September – 17 October)

== Awards ==
=== Player awards ===
Award	Player	Ref
Player of the Year	(France) Sylvain Legwinski	
Players' Player of the Year	(France) Sylvain Legwinski	
Young Player of the Year	(England) Tommy Smith	
Goal of the Season	(Wales) Gavin Williams	
