= 2009–10 Bristol City F.C. season =

Bristol City
2009–10 season
- Chairman: Steve Lansdown
- Manager: Gary Johnson
- Stadium: Ashton Gate Stadium
- Championship: 10th
- FA Cup: Third round (eliminated by Cardiff City)
- League Cup: Second round (eliminated by Carlisle United)
- Top goalscorer: League: Nicky Maynard (10); All: Nicky Maynard (11)
- Highest home attendance: 16,035 (vs Watford, 28 December 2009)
- Lowest home attendance: 6,359 (vs Carlisle United, 26 August 2009)
- Average home league attendance: 14,601
Home colours	Away colours

The 2009–10 football season was Bristol City's 112th season as a professional football club and third consecutive season in the second division. They competed in the Football League Championship having finished in tenth position the previous season. Bristol City were knocked out in the second round of the Football League Cup against Carlisle United. They also entered the FA Cup in January 2010 at the third round stage, losing to Cardiff City after a replay.

== Competitions ==
=== League One ===
==== League table ====
Pos	Team	Pld	W	D	L	GF	GA	GD	Pts
8	Sheffield United	46	17	14	15	62	55	+7	65
9	Reading	46	17	12	17	68	63	+5	63
10	Bristol City	46	15	18	13	56	65	−9	63
11	Middlesbrough	46	16	14	16	58	50	+8	62
12	Doncaster Rovers	46	15	15	16	59	58	+1	60

Source: The Football League
Rules for classification: 1) points; 2) goal difference; 3) number of goals scored.

==== Results ====
Championship match details
Date	Opponents	Venue	Result	Score F–A	Scorers	Attendance	Ref.
8 August 2009	Preston North End	A	D	2–2	Hartley 49' (pen.), Clarkson 58'	13,025	
15 August 2009	Crystal Palace	H	W	1–0	Maynard 89'	14,603	
18 August 2009	Queens Park Rangers	H	W	1–0	Maynard 78'	14,571	
23 August 2009	Cardiff City	A	L	0–3		20,853	
29 August 2009	Middlesbrough	H	W	2–1	Maynard 63', 90+1'	14,402	
12 September 2009	Coventry City	A	D	1–1	Maynard 48'	16,449	
15 September 2009	Swansea City	A	D	0–0		12,859	
19 September 2009	Scunthorpe United	H	D	1–1	Saborío 50'	14,203	
26 September 2009	Derby County	A	L	0–1		27,144	
29 September 2009	Blackpool	H	W	2–0	Maynard 28', Haynes 57'	13,673	
3 October 2009	Newcastle United	A	D	0–0		43,326	
17 October 2009	Peterborough United	H	D	1–1	Skuse 31'	13,833	
20 October 2009	Plymouth Argyle	H	W	3–1	Haynes 73', McCombe 76', Maynard 79'	15,021	
24 October 2009	Barnsley	A	W	3–2	Maynard 26', Sno 42', Elliott 75'	11,314	
31 October 2009	Sheffield Wednesday	H	D	1–1	Maynard 59'	15,005	
7 November 2009	Nottingham Forest	A	D	1–1	Haynes 90'	21,467	
21 November 2009	West Bromwich Albion	A	L	1–4	Hartley 83'	23,444	
28 November 2009	Sheffield United	H	L	2–3	Carey 53', Saborío 90+5'	14,637	
5 December 2009	Ipswich Town	H	D	0–0		14,287	
8 December 2009	Leicester City	A	W	3–1	Sproule 19', Skuse 29', Sno 76'	19,349	
12 December 2009	Doncaster Rovers	A	L	0–1		9,572	
19 December 2009	Reading	H	D	1–1	Hartley 13' (pen.)	14,366	
26 December 2009	Queens Park Rangers	A	L	1–2	Maynard 57'	13,534	
28 December 2009	Watford	H	D	2–2	Haynes 38', Hartley 45+2'	16,035	
16 January 2010	Preston North End	H	W	4–2	Haynes 2', Fontaine 12', Carey 58', Sno 90'	13,146	
26 January 2010	Cardiff City	H	L	0–6		13,825	
30 January 2010	Middlesbrough	A	D	0–0		17,865	
6 February 2010	Coventry City	H	D	1–1	Clarkson 83'	13,852	
9 February 2010	Watford	A	L	0–2		12,179	
13 February 2010	Sheffield United	A	L	0–2		22,613	
16 February 2010	Leicester City	H	D	1–1	Clarkson 90+1'	13,746	
21 February 2010	West Bromwich Albion	H	W	2–1	Iwelumo 55', Johnson 59'	14,374	
27 February 2010	Ipswich Town	A	D	0–0		20,302	
6 March 2010	Doncaster Rovers	H	L	2–5	Orr 9', 15'	13,401	
9 March 2010	Crystal Palace	A	W	1–0	Iwelumo 73'	12,844	
13 March 2010	Reading	A	L	0–2		17,900	
16 March 2010	Plymouth Argyle	A	L	2–3	Maynard 58', 78'	9,289	
20 March 2010	Newcastle United	H	D	2–2	Nyatanga 10', Maynard 44'	19,144	
23 March 2010	Barnsley	H	W	5–3	Haynes 2', 63', Maynard 43', 56', Hartley 76' (pen.)	13,009	
27 March 2010	Peterborough United	A	W	1–0	Clarkson 71'	6,445	
3 April 2010	Nottingham Forest	H	D	1–1	Fontaine 3'	16,125	
5 April 2010	Sheffield Wednesday	A	W	1–0	Maynard 81'	19,688	
10 April 2010	Swansea City	H	W	1–0	Maynard 84'	14,719	
17 April 2010	Scunthorpe United	A	L	0–3		5,430	
24 April 2010	Derby County	H	W	2–1	Maynard 3', 79' (pen.)	15,835	
2 May 2010	Blackpool	A	D	1–1	Maynard 16'	12,296	

=== FA Cup ===
FA Cup match details
Round	Date	Opponents	Venue	Result	Score F–A	Scorers	Attendance	Ref.
Third round	12 January 2010	Cardiff City	H	D	1–1	Williams 90+2'	7,289	
Third round replay	19 January 2010	Cardiff City	A	L	0–1		6,731	

=== Football League Cup ===
Football League Cup match details
Round	Date	Opponents	Venue	Result	Score F–A	Scorers	Attendance	Ref.
First round	11 August 2009	Brentford	A	W	1–0	Maynard 58'	3,024	
Second round	26 August 2009	Carlisle United	H	L	0–2		6,359	

== Players ==
=== Transfers ===
==== In ====
Date	Name	From	Fee	Ref
29 June 2009	David Clarkson	Motherwell	£600,000	
30 June 2009	Dean Gerken	Colchester United	Undisclosed	
19 January 2010	Jamal Campbell-Ryce	Barnsley	Undisclosed	

==== Loans in ====
Date from	Name	From	Date until	Ref
17 August 2009	Andrius Velička	Rangers	End of season	
1 September 2009	Álvaro Saborío	FC Sion	17 February 2010	
1 September 2009	Evander Sno	Ajax	End of season	
13 February 2010	Chris Iwelumo	Wolverhampton Wanderers	13 March 2010	
15 March 2010	Stefan Maierhofer	Wolverhampton Wanderers	12 April 2010	

==== Out ====
Date	Name	To	Fee	Ref
4 August 2009	Michael McIndoe	Coventry City	Undisclosed	

==== Loans out ====
Date from	Name	To	Date until	Ref
13 November 2009	John Akinde	Wycombe Wanderers	7 January 2010	
1 January 2010	Lee Johnson	Derby County	31 January 2010	
21 January 2010	Frankie Artus	Chesterfield	1 March 2010	
1 February 2010	John Akinde	Brentford	1 March 2010	
12 February 2010	Peter Štyvar	Spartak Trnava	End of season	
