= David Wright (English footballer) =

English footballer and manager

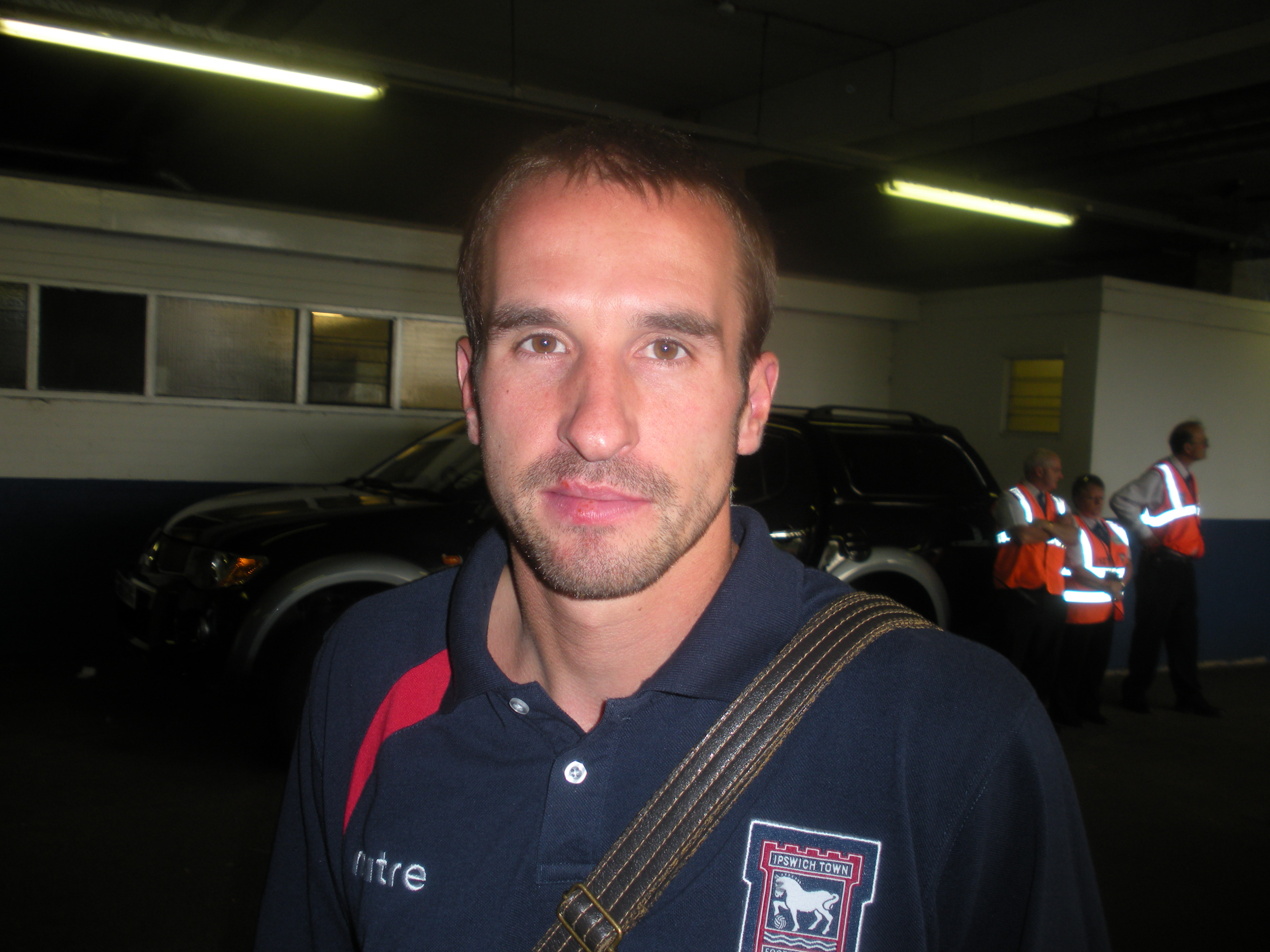

Personal information
- Full name: David Wright
- Date of birth: 1 May 1980 (age 46)
- Place of birth: Warrington, England
- Height: 5 ft 11 in (1.80 m)
- Positions: Defender; midfielder

Team information
- Current team: Ipswich Town Women (manager)

Youth career
- –1997: Crewe Alexandra

Senior career*
Years	Team	Apps	(Gls)
1997–2004	Crewe Alexandra	211	(3)
2004–2007	Wigan Athletic	45	(0)
2005	→ Norwich City (loan)	5	(0)
2007–2010	Ipswich Town	120	(5)
2010–2013	Crystal Palace	51	(0)
2012	→ Gillingham (loan)	7	(0)
2013–2014	Colchester United	49	(1)
Total		488	(9)

Managerial career
- 2015: Maldon & Tiptree
- 2016: Colchester United (caretaker)
- 2016: Colchester United U18
- 2016–2019: Norwich City U18
- 2019–2021: Norwich City U23
- 2026–: Ipswich Town Women
- * Club domestic league appearances and goals

David Wright (born 1 May 1980) is an English former professional footballer and manager who is currently manager of Ipswich Town Women.

Wright began his playing career at Crewe Alexandra, where he helped the club to promotion to the First Division in 2002–03 following the club's relegation to the Second Division in the previous season. He went on the make over 200 league appearances for the club. He also played over 100 league games for Ipswich Town between 2007 and 2010, as well as representing Wigan Athletic, Norwich City on loan, Crystal Palace, Gillingham on loan and Colchester United.

In 2013, Wright took on his first coaching role at the Ipswich Town Academy, before taking on a similar role at Colchester while also managing Isthmian League side Maldon & Tiptree in 2015. He left the Jammers in December 2015 to team up with new Colchester United manager Kevin Keen as his assistant. After Keen left by mutual consent in April 2016, Wright took temporary charge of Colchester's penultimate league game of the 2015–16 season. He was then appointed manager of the under-18 team, before moving to Norwich City to take up the same role. He was appointed manager of Ipswich Town Women in April 2026.

== Club career ==
=== Crewe Alexandra ===
Born in Warrington, Wright rose through the youth team ranks at Crewe Alexandra, making his first-team debut for the Railwaymen in August 1997 as a late substitute during a 2–0 away win against Norwich City. He made three First Division appearances during the 1997–98 season, and established himself in the following season, making 20 league appearances and a substitute appearance in the League Cup. He scored his first goal during the 1998–99 season when he netted the opening goal in a 5–1 thrashing of West Bromwich Albion on 5 April 1999.

Wright went on to make 213 league appearances for Crewe in his seven years with the club. On the back of relegation to the Second Division in 2002, Wright helped the club gain immediate promotion back to Division One after finishing in the runners-up spot.

=== Wigan Athletic ===
In June 2004, Wright signed for Wigan Athletic for an undisclosed fee in the region of £250,000. Making 31 Championship appearances in the 2004–05 season, he again experienced promotion, on this occasion to the Premier League. However, Wright found himself out of favour in his second season, and having not made a league appearance, he joined Norwich City on a one-month loan deal in November 2005.

Wright made five appearances for the Canaries before returning to Wigan. Following his loan spell, Wright made his Premier League bow for the Latics, replacing Leighton Baines at left back after 66 minutes in what ended as a 3–0 home defeat to Blackburn Rovers on 31 December 2005. He made one further appearance in the 2005–06 season, starting in an away game at Birmingham City two days after his last appearance. Wigan were defeated 2–0 as Wright played the full 90 minutes.

The 2006–07 season saw Wright make 12 Premier League appearances. Wright played his final game for Wigan on New Year's Day 2007, featuring as a substitute in another 3–0 home defeat to Blackburn.

=== Ipswich Town ===
Ipswich Town signed Wright from Wigan in January 2007 on a three-and-a-half-year deal. He made his Town debut in a 1–0 defeat to Sunderland at the Stadium of Light on 13 January, and in only his second appearance for the club, Wright found himself sent off for handling the ball in Ipswich's 3–2 win over local rivals Colchester United. His only goal of the campaign came in the East Anglian derby against his former side Norwich City, the equalising goal in a 1–1 draw on 22 April.

Wright featured regularly for Town in the 2007–08 season, ending the campaign with 43 appearances in all competitions and scoring two goals; against Bristol City in a 6–0 thrashing and against West Bromwich Albion on New Year's Day 2008.

During the 2008–09 season, although Wright was born in Warrington, England, Scotland and former Ipswich Town manager George Burley was considering selecting Wright for the Scotland national team due to his grandparents Scottish ancestry. However, this never came to fruition. Another solid season saw Wright rack up another 36 appearances and score the decisive goal in a 2–1 win against Nottingham Forest on 18 February 2009.

Wright scored the only goal of the game in a match against Derby County on 31 October 2009 to halt manager Roy Keane's winless run of 15 games, in what was the team's first win of the season. Following this, Wright made a further 21 appearances in the 2009–10 season, bringing his total appearance figure for Ipswich to 128 matches.

=== Crystal Palace ===
Former Scotland manager George Burley signed Wright for his Crystal Palace side on a two-year contract in June 2010. He made his debut for the Eagles on 14 August 2010 as Palace fell to a 1–0 defeat away at Barnsley. Wright made 29 appearances during the 2010–11 season and made a further 25 appearances in his second season.

Wright played just three games for Palace during the 2012–13 season before joining League Two club Gillingham in September 2012, on loan for one month. He made seven appearances during the spell, and although the club attempted to extend his loan, the deal fell through as it was not confirmed before a 17:00 GMT transfer deadline on 22 November 2012. Following this loan spell, Wright did not make any further appearances for Crystal Palace before leaving the club.

=== Colchester United ===
On 25 January 2013, Wright signed for League One club Colchester United on a free transfer. He made his debut for the club in a 2–0 win over Walsall the following day, a win which marked the first points in nine games for the U's.

After ending his first season with Colchester with 12 League One appearances, Wright held down a regular role during the 2013–14 season and scored his first professional goal in four and a half years in Colchester's 4–2 defeat to Wolverhampton Wanderers at Molineux on 25 March 2014. He signed a new one-year contract with the club on 3 July 2014. After making only three substitute appearances in the 2014–15 season, Wright was released from his Colchester contract by mutual consent on 26 November 2014.

== Coaching career ==
=== Ipswich Town Academy ===
While playing for Colchester United, during the summer of 2013, Wright was appointed Academy coach at nearby Ipswich Town, where he coached players in the under-14, under-15 and under-16 age groups. He continued in his role following his contractual release from Colchester in November 2014.

=== Maldon & Tiptree ===
He returned to the coaching set-up at Colchester in June 2015, linking up with the club's academy to work under John McGreal. In a dual-coaching role, the move also saw him named as manager of Isthmian League Division One North side Maldon & Tiptree in a development link-up between the two clubs. His role would see him act as a full-time coach with Colchester, while managing Maldon & Tiptree on a part-time basis. Wright said "I'm very excited about the opportunity and I'm really looking forward to it".

=== Colchester United ===
After taking charge of Maldon & Tiptree for 25 games, resulting in ten league wins, five draws and ten defeats, Wright was appointed assistant manager to Kevin Keen at Colchester United on 21 December 2015 following Tony Humes exit from the club. Wright left the Jammers in 14th position in the table. After Keen left by mutual consent on 26 April 2016, Wright was named as caretaker manager for the penultimate game of the 2015–16 season following Colchester's relegation from League One three days earlier. In his first game in charge, he led the club to a 2–2 draw against Barnsley at Oakwell. After Colchester took the lead in the first-half, two Barnsley goals second-half turned the match in the home side's favour, but an equaliser in the eighth minute of stoppage time from Tom Lapslie rescued a point for Wright and his team. John McGreal was named permanent manager on 4 May ahead of Colchester's final game of the season. Wright was appointed in a new role in May 2016, becoming manager of Colchester's under-18 team.

=== Norwich City U18/U23 ===
In November 2016, Wright left Colchester to take up the role of under-18s manager at Norwich City. In 2019, he was appointed manager of the club's U23 side.

=== Milton Keynes Dons ===
On 17 August 2021, Wright joined League One club Milton Keynes Dons as assistant first team coach, working under new manager Liam Manning. Wright departed the club alongside Manning on 11 December 2022.

=== Ipswich Town Women ===
On 6 January 2026, Wright was appointed caretaker manager of Ipswich Town Women, following the departure of Joe Sheehan. On 24 April 2026, he was appointed to the job on a permanent basis, after guiding the team to three wins in nine games which saw Ipswich rise to 10th place in the WSL2 at the time of his appointment.

== Career statistics ==
=== Playing statistics ===
Club	Season	League			FA Cup		League Cup		Other		Total	
Club	Season	Division	Apps	Goals	Apps	Goals	Apps	Goals	Apps	Goals	Apps	Goals
Crewe Alexandra	1997–98	First Division	3	0	0	0	0	0	—		3	0
Crewe Alexandra	1998–99	First Division	20	1	0	1	0	0	—		21	1
Crewe Alexandra	1999–2000	First Division	45	0	1	0	3	0	—		49	0
Crewe Alexandra	2000–01	First Division	42	0	2	0	4	0	—		48	0
Crewe Alexandra	2001–02	First Division	30	0	4	0	0	0	—		34	0
Crewe Alexandra	2002–03	Second Division	31	1	4	0	1	0	4 (Note: Appearance(s) in Football League Trophy)	0	40	1
Crewe Alexandra	2003–04	First Division	40	1	1	0	2	0	—		43	1
Crewe Alexandra	Total		211	3	12	0	11	0	4	0	238	3
Wigan Athletic	2004–05	Championship	31	0	1	0	0	0	—		32	0
Wigan Athletic	2005–06	Premier League	2	0	0	0	2	0	—		4	0
Wigan Athletic	2006–07	Premier League	12	0	0	0	1	0	—		13	0
Wigan Athletic	Total		45	0	1	0	3	0	—		49	0
Norwich City (loan)	2005–06	Championship	5	0	0	0	0	0	—		5	0
Ipswich Town	2006–07	Championship	19	1	1	0	0	0	—		20	1
Ipswich Town	2007–08	Championship	41	2	1	0	1	0	—		43	2
Ipswich Town	2008–09	Championship	34	1	2	0	0	0	—		36	1
Ipswich Town	2009–10	Championship	26	1	1	0	2	0	—		29	1
Ipswich Town	Total		120	5	5	0	3	0	—		128	5
Crystal Palace	2010–11	Championship	28	0	1	0	0	0	—		29	0
Crystal Palace	2011–12	Championship	22	0	1	0	2	0	—		25	0
Crystal Palace	2012–13	Championship	1	0	0	0	2	0	—		3	0
Crystal Palace	Total		51	0	2	0	4	0	—		57	0
Gillingham (loan)	2012–13	League Two	7	0	0	0	0	0	0	0	7	0
Colchester United	2012–13	League One	12	0	0	0	0	0	0	0	12	0
Colchester United	2013–14	League One	35	1	0	0	1	0	1	0	36	1
Colchester United	2014–15	League One	2	0	0	0	0	0	1	0	3	0
Colchester United	Total		49	1	0	0	1	0	2	0	52	1
Career total			488	9	20	0	22	0	6	0	536	9

=== Managerial statistics ===
As of match played 30 April 2016.

Team	From	To	Record				
Team	From	To	G	W	D	L	Win %
Maldon & Tiptree	17 June 2015	21 December 2015	30	11	5	14	36.67
Colchester United (caretaker)	26 April 2016	4 May 2016	1	0	1	0	0.00

== Honours ==
Crewe Alexandra

- Football League Second Division runner-up: 2002–03

Wigan Athletic

- Football League Championship runner-up: 2004–05
