= Dean Bowditch =

English footballer (born 1986)

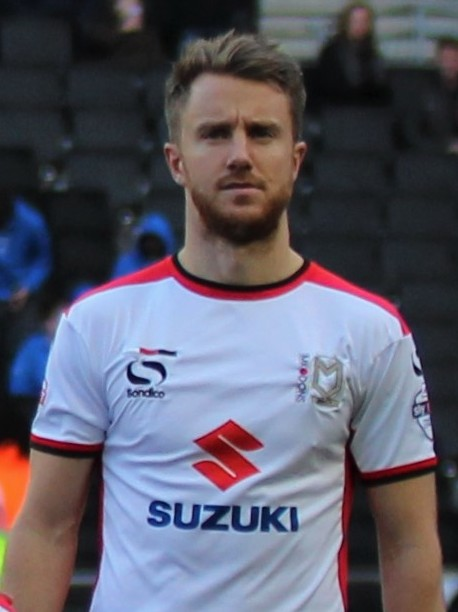
- Bowditch in January 2015

Personal information
- Full name: Dean Peter Bowditch
- Date of birth: 15 June 1986 (age 40)
- Place of birth: Bishop's Stortford, England
- Height: 5 ft 11 in (1.80 m)
- Positions: Midfielder; forward

Youth career
- 1996–2002: Ipswich Town

Senior career*
Years	Team	Apps	(Gls)
2002–2009	Ipswich Town	72	(8)
2005	→ Burnley (loan)	10	(1)
2006	→ Wycombe Wanderers (loan)	11	(1)
2006	→ Brighton & Hove Albion (loan)	3	(1)
2007–2008	→ Northampton Town (loan)	10	(2)
2008	→ Brighton & Hove Albion (loan)	5	(0)
2008–2009	→ Brentford (loan)	9	(2)
2009–2011	Yeovil Town	71	(25)
2011–2017	Milton Keynes Dons	192	(37)
2017–2019	Northampton Town	31	(3)
2018	→ Stevenage (loan)	5	(2)
2019–2020	Stowmarket Town	8	(0)
Total		427	(82)

International career
2001–2002	England U16	8	(0)
2002–2003	England U17	5	(0)
2004–2005	England U19	6	(0)
- * Club domestic league appearances and goals as of 12:04, 20 February 2020 (UTC)

Dean Peter Bowditch (born 15 June 1986) is an English former professional footballer who played as a midfielder or forward.

He made over 200 appearances for Milton Keynes Dons and also played for Ipswich Town, Northampton Town and Yeovil Town, with loan spells at Brighton & Hove Albion, Wycombe Wanderers, Burnley, Brentford and Stevenage.

== Club career ==
=== Ipswich Town ===
Bowditch joined the academy of Ipswich Town at the age of ten and progressed through several age groups. He made his first team debut in March 2003, aged 16, when he came off the bench against local rivals Norwich City, a match in which Ipswich won 2–0. The following season, he became the club's youngest player to score a hat-trick, against Watford. He was named the club's 2003–04 Academy Player of the Year. A series of injuries saw him feature less for the Ipswich first team and he was loaned to Burnley, Wycombe Wanderers and Brighton & Hove Albion. On 22 November 2007 he signed a one-month loan deal at Northampton Town.

On 11 February 2008, Bowditch agreed to re-join Brighton & Hove Albion on loan, initially for one-month. On 31 October 2008, he joined Brentford on loan until January 2009, with an option to be recalled after one month.

Ipswich released Bowditch at the end of the 2008–09 season.

=== Yeovil Town ===
Bowditch signed a one-year contract with League One club Yeovil on 30 July 2009. He scored on his debut against Tranmere but was later injured. On 14 November, he returned from injury and scored as a second-half substitute in Yeovil's 1–0 win over Southend. He scored his 9th goal of the season against Leeds United on 5 April 2010 in a 2–1 defeat. He reached double figures for the season with the opener against Millwall on Tuesday 13 April 2010. Having finished the 2009–10 season as Yeovil's top scorer, he signed a new contract with the club on 16 June 2010. At the end of the 2010–11 season, he was informed by the club that he was one of seven Yeovil players who would be awarded new contracts. However, rejected this contract offer and left Yeovil.

=== Milton Keynes Dons ===
On 20 June 2011, Dean Bowditch signed a two-year deal with Milton Keynes Dons, becoming manager Karl Robinson's first signing of the 2011–12 season. Despite playing as a striker for most of his career he has spent the majority of his spell at the Dons playing wide left, providing 13 assists and scoring 15. He has become a fan favourite for the Dons and was their top scorer and topped the assist table for the 2012–13 season, despite being primarily deployed as a winger or a wide midfielder. On 10 March 2014, Bowditch signed a new one-year deal with the club.

On 25 April 2017, after 6 seasons, 227 appearances and 48 goals, Milton Keynes Dons announced that Bowditch would leave the club at the end of the 2016–17 season.

=== Northampton Town ===
On 23 June 2017, Northampton Town announced the signing of Bowditch on a two-year deal effective from 1 July 2017. Following limited opportunities, Bowditch joined League Two club Stevenage on loan on 31 January 2018, with the deal running for the remainder of the 2017–18 season. He was later one of 8 players released by Northampton at the end of the 2018–19 season.

=== Stowmarket Town ===
On 19 November 2019, Bowditch signed for Eastern Counties League Premier Division club Stowmarket Town until the end of the season. Bowditch scored his first goal for Stowmarket in a 4–0 win against Stansted in the FA Vase.

== International career ==
Bowditch received his first call-up to the England U16 national team in July 2001. On 26 October 2001, he scored two goals in a 4–3 win over Spain U16. He was called up to the England U17 side in June 2002 for the Nationwide International Tournament. He made his England U17 debut on 8 July 2002, featuring as a second-half substitute in a 2–2 draw with Italy U17. He helped England to win the Nationwide Tournament. In January 2004, Bowditch was placed on stand-by for the England U19 squad ahead of a friendly with Netherlands U19 the following month. He was again placed on stand-by for the England U19s in March 2004, whilst also receiving a call up to the England U18 side on 12 March, however he was left out of the Under-18 side that faced Belgium U18 in a friendly, following a recall request by Ipswich. He featured for England U19 in a 2–0 win over Republic of Ireland U19 on 10 September 2004.

== Personal life ==
He has an older brother, Ben Bowditch, who plays for Potters Bar Town.

== Career statistics ==
As of match played 18 February 2020

Appearances and goals by club, season and competition
Club	Season	League			FA Cup		League Cup		Other		Total	
Club	Season	Division	Apps	Goals	Apps	Goals	Apps	Goals	Apps	Goals	Apps	Goals
Ipswich Town	2002–03	First Division	4	0	0	0	0	0	—		4	0
Ipswich Town	2003–04	First Division	16	4	1	0	2	1	1 (Note: Appearance in First Division play-offs)	0	20	5
Ipswich Town	2004–05	Championship	21	3	0	0	2	0	1 (Note: Appearance in Championship play-offs)	0	24	3
Ipswich Town	2005–06	Championship	21	0	0	0	1	0	—		22	0
Ipswich Town	2006–07	Championship	9	1	0	0	1	0	—		10	1
Ipswich Town	2007–08	Championship	0	0	0	0	0	0	—		0	0
Ipswich Town	2008–09	Championship	1	0	0	0	1	0	—		2	0
Ipswich Town	Total		72	8	1	0	7	1	2	0	82	9
Burnley (loan)	2004–05	Championship	10	1	0	0	0	0	—		10	1
Wycombe Wanderers (loan)	2005–06	League Two	11	1	0	0	0	0	0	0	11	1
Brighton & Hove Albion (loan)	2006–07	League One	3	1	0	0	0	0	1 (Note: Appearance in Football League Trophy)	0	4	1
Northampton Town (loan)	2007–08	League One	10	2	0	0	0	0	0	0	10	2
Brighton & Hove Albion (loan)	2007–08	League One	5	0	0	0	0	0	0	0	5	0
Brentford (loan)	2008–09	League Two	9	2	0	0	0	0	0	0	9	2
Yeovil Town	2009–10	League One	30	10	0	0	0	0	0	0	30	10
Yeovil Town	2010–11	League One	41	15	2	0	1	0	1	0	45	15
Yeovil Town	Total		71	25	2	0	1	0	1	0	75	25
Milton Keynes Dons	2011–12	League One	41	12	4	3	3	0	3 (Note: Two appearances in League One play-offs, one appearance in Football League Trophy)	0	51	15
Milton Keynes Dons	2012–13	League One	39	8	5	3	3	1	1	0	48	12
Milton Keynes Dons	2013–14	League One	12	1	1	0	0	0	0	0	13	1
Milton Keynes Dons	2014–15	League One	35	7	1	0	3	0	1	0	40	7
Milton Keynes Dons	2015–16	Championship	37	4	3	0	0	0	—		40	4
Milton Keynes Dons	2016–17	League One	28	5	3	1	2	3	2 (Note: Appearances in EFL Trophy)	0	35	9
Milton Keynes Dons	Total		192	37	17	7	11	4	7	0	227	48
Northampton Town	2017–18	League One	11	0	2	0	0	0	3	0	16	0
Northampton Town	2018–19	League Two	20	3	0	0	1	0	3	0	24	3
Northampton Town	Total		31	3	2	0	1	0	6	0	40	3
Stevenage (loan)	2017–18	League Two	5	2	0	0	0	0	0	0	5	2
Stowmarket Town	2019–20	ECL Premier Division	8	0	—		—		4 (Note: Three appearances in FA Vase, one appearance in Eastern Counties League Challenge Cup)	1	12	1
Career total			427	82	22	7	20	5	21	1	490	95

== Honours ==
Milton Keynes Dons

- Football League One runner-up: 2014–15

England U17

- Nationwide Tournament: 2002

Individual

- Ipswich Town Academy Player of the Year: 2003–04
- Football League One Player of the Month: February 2012
