= Chris Casement =

Northern Irish professional footballer

Personal information
- Full name: Christopher Casement
- Date of birth: 12 January 1988 (age 38)
- Place of birth: Belfast, Northern Ireland
- Position: Defender

Team information
- Current team: Ipswich Wanderers

Youth career
- Ipswich Town

Senior career*
Years	Team	Apps	(Gls)
2005–2009	Ipswich Town	8	(0)
2007	→ Millwall (loan)	0	(0)
2008–2009	→ Hamilton Academical (loan)	4	(0)
2009	→ Wycombe Wanderers (loan)	12	(0)
2009–2010	Dundee	1	(0)
2010	→ Linfield (loan)	8	(0)
2010–2012	Linfield	39	(2)
2012–2016	Portadown	167	(16)
2016–2020	Linfield	197	(6)
2020–2023	Stowmarket Town		
2023–2024	Leiston	33	(2)
2024–	Ipswich Wanderers	0	(0)

International career^{‡}
2007–2009	Northern Ireland U21	23	(2)
2009	Northern Ireland B	1	(0)
2009	Northern Ireland	1	(0)

Managerial career
- 2023: Stowmarket Town
- * Club domestic league appearances and goals as of 15:45, 25 June 2024 (UTC) ‡ National team caps and goals as of 14 November 2018

Christopher Casement (born 12 January 1988) is a Northern Irish professional footballer who plays for Ipswich Wanderers. He began his senior career with Ipswich Town for whom he played from 2005 to 2009, during which time he participated in several loans. He played for Dundee from 2009 to 2010 and, in the 2010s, he played for Linfield and Portadown. He also played internationally for Northern Ireland between 2007 and 2009, primarily for the under-21 football team, and gained one full international cap in 2009.

== Early life ==
Casement attended Newtownbreda High School in south Belfast.

== Club career ==
After accomplished displays in the FA Cup, most notably against Swansea City and Watford in January 2007, Casement moved out on loan to Millwall for three months. When he did finally join Millwall, he did not make an appearance during his month there.

In August 2008, he signed on loan with Hamilton Academical until January 2009. Chances were limited for Casement, and he returned to Ipswich having mainly been used as a substitute. On 7 January 2009, Casement signed on loan for League Two side Wycombe Wanderers for a month. This loan deal was subsequently extended, firstly to two months, then to three months. Casement returned to Ipswich before being released on 8 May.

On 22 June, it was announced that he had signed a three-year deal with Scottish First Division side Dundee.

On 31 January, Casement signed on loan for Linfield until the end of the season. On 4 May 2010, he was informed along with three other players that he was no longer wanted by Dundee and was free to look for another club. On 8 May 2012, it was confirmed Casement had signed a three-year contract with Portadown. On 26 July 2016, it was announced that Portadown had accepted a bid in the region of £20,000 for Casement and it was announced later that he would be rejoining the Blues on a two-year contract.

On 30 September 2020, Casement signed for Stowmarket Town. He was appointed manager of the club in February 2023. In May 2023, he stepped down as manager to focus fully on the continuation of his playing career.

In June 2023, Casement joined Leiston.

In June 2024, Casement joined Isthmian League North Division side Ipswich Wanderers.

== International career ==
Casement was called up to the Northern Ireland squad in May 2009, along with nine other uncapped players for the international friendly against Italy on 6 June. He made his international debut, along with seven other debutants, in the 3–0 defeat against Italy in the friendly match at Arena Garibaldi in Pisa. Casement played the full match.

== Career statistics ==
=== Club ===
As of match played on 12 September 2020.

Appearances and goals by club, season and competition
Club	Season	League			National Cup (Note: Appearances in the FA Cup and Irish Cup.)		League Cup (Note: Appearances in the EFL Cup and Northern Ireland Football League Cup.)		Continental		Other		Total	
Club	Season	Division	Apps	Goals	Apps	Goals	Apps	Goals	Apps	Goals	Apps	Goals	Apps	Goals
Ipswich Town	2005–06	Championship	5	0	0	0	0	0	—		—		5	0
Ipswich Town	2006–07	Championship	0	0	3	0	1	0	—		—		4	0
Ipswich Town	2007–08	Championship	3	0	0	0	0	0	—		—		3	0
Ipswich Town	2008–09	Championship	0	0	0	0	2	0	—		—		2	0
Ipswich Town	Total		8	0	3	0	3	0	—		—		14	0
Hamilton Academical (loan)	2008–09	Scottish Premier League	1	0	0	0	0	0	—		—		1	0
Wycombe Wanderers (loan)	2008–09	League Two	12	0	0	0	0	0	—		—		12	0
Dundee	2009–10	Scottish First Division	1	0	0	0	0	0	—		—		1	0
Linfield (loan)	2009–10	NIFL Premiership	8	0	0	0	0	0	—		—		8	0
Linfield	2010–11	NIFL Premiership	26	2	0	0	1	0	—		1 (Note: Appearance in the Setanta Sports Cup.)	0	28	2
Linfield	2011–12	NIFL Premiership	13	0	1	0	1	0	2 (Note: Appearance in the UEFA Champions League.)	0	—		17	0
Linfield	Total		47	2	1	0	2	0	2	0	1	0	53	2
Portadown	2011–12	NIFL Premiership	29	0	3	1	2	0	4 (Note: Appearance in the UEFA Europa League.)	0	—		38	1
Portadown	2013–14	NIFL Premiership	37	5	0	0	2	0	—		—		39	5
Portadown	2014–15	NIFL Premiership	33	6	2	1	2	0	—		—		37	7
Portadown	2015–16	NIFL Premiership	36	4	2	0	1	0	—		—		39	4
Portadown	Total		135	15	7	2	7	0	4	0	—		153	17
Linfield	2016–17	NIFL Premiership	26	0	2	0	1	0	—		1 (Note: Appearance in the Scottish Challenge Cup.)	0	30	0
Linfield	2017–18	NIFL Premiership	17	0	1	0	1	0	4	0	1 (Note: Appearance in the NIFL Charity Shield.)	0	20	0
Linfield	2018–19	NIFL Premiership	31	3	1	0	3	0	—		—		34	3
Linfield	2019–20	NIFL Premiership	15	1	0	0	1	0	8 (Note: Appearances in the UEFA Champions League and UEFA Europa League.)	0	—		24	1
Linfield	Total		89	4	4	0	5	0	12	0	2	0	112	4
Career total			289	21	15	2	18	0	18	0	3	0	343	23

=== International ===
Appearances and goals by national team and year
National team	Year	Apps	Goals
Northern Ireland	2009	1	0
Total		1	0

== Honours ==
Ipswich Town

- FA Youth Cup: 2004–05

Linfield

- IFA Premiership: 2010–11, 2011–12, 2012–13, 2016–17, 2018–19
- Irish Cup: 2010–11, 2011–12, 2012–13, 2016–17

Individual

- Ipswich Town Young Player of the Year: 2004–05
