= Jaime Peters =

Canadian soccer player (born 1987)

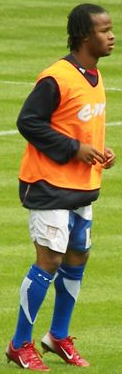
- Peters with Ipswich Town in 2007

Personal information
- Full name: Jaime Bryant Piet Peters
- Date of birth: 4 May 1987 (age 39)
- Place of birth: Pickering, Ontario, Canada
- Height: 1.70 m (5 ft 7 in)
- Position: Right wing-back

Youth career
- C.S. Azzurri
- North Scarborough SC
- 2003–2005: 1. FC Kaiserslautern
- 2005: Ipswich Town

Senior career*
Years	Team	Apps	(Gls)
2005–2012	Ipswich Town	99	(4)
2007–2008	→ Yeovil Town (loan)	14	(1)
2008–2009	→ Gillingham (loan)	3	(0)
2011–2012	→ AFC Bournemouth (loan)	8	(0)
2021	Master's FA	2	(0)
Total		125	(5)

International career
2002–2003	Canada U16	8	(1)
2003	Canada U17	6	(1)
2004–2007	Canada U20	29	(2)
2003	Canada U23	1	(0)
2004–2011	Canada	26	(1)
- * Club domestic league appearances and goals

Jaime Bryant Piet Peters (born 4 May 1987) is a Canadian former professional soccer player who played as a right wing-back. He represented Canada at various levels. He was a member of the U20 team at the 2007 FIFA U-20 World Cup.

== Youth career ==
Peters grew up in Pickering, Ontario and played youth soccer with North Scarborough SC and Toronto-based C.S. Azzurri.

In 2003, Peters joined the youth set-up at German club 1. FC Kaiserslautern. Two years later, he rejected offers from Premier League giants Chelsea and Manchester United, opting instead for Ipswich Town on recommendation by former Canada coach Frank Yallop. However, Peters spent the rest of the season with the academy, he yet received a work permit, but managed to do in the summer.

== Club career ==
=== Ipswich Town ===
Shortly after being granted a work permit, Peters made his Ipswich Town debut, where he came on as a substitute in the second half, in a 1–0 win over Cardiff City in the opening game of the season. Despite facing competitions, as well as, his own injury concern, he went on to make thirteen appearances in the 2005–06 season. During the season, he was featured in the reserve and scored a hat-trick, in an 8–1 win over Watford's Reserve.

In the 2006–07 season, Peters was told by Manager Jim Magilton that he can leave the club on loan to get first team experience. Despite this, he stayed at the club, making eleven appearances and went on to receive the most improved player award in the 2006–07 season, as well as, being offered a new contract. After winning the most improved player award, he was granted a work permit for the second time, allowing him to sign a three-year contract with the club.

After three appearances at Gillingham, he returned to Ipswich and played his first 2008–09 game for the club in the 3–2 derby win over Norwich City on 19 April, coming on as a substitute for the injured Ben Thatcher. Peters also appeared two more matches later in the 2008–09 season against Cardiff City and Coventry City, where he made three appearances for the club this season.

As Peters returned to Ipswich from his various loans spells in mid-2009, newly appointed manager Roy Keane experimented Peters at right back. After suffering from an injury at the start of the season, he then returned to the first team against Middlesbrough on 12 September 2009. After signing a contract with the club, keeping him until 2013, Peters then scored his first goal for the club ten days later, on 26 December 2009, in a 3–1 loss against Crystal Palace. Peters went to finish the 2009–10 season, making thirty-four appearances and scoring once in all competitions.

Because of his role in the right back from the previous season, this test worked out pushing the previously struggling winger into the first team, Peters partaking in the first 15 matches of the 2010/2011 season. Peters scored his first goal of the campaign against Scunthorpe United on 25 September, the game ended in a 1–1 away draw. However Peters had his strongest performance as a Tractor Boy in the first game after Keane was sacked. It came in the League Cup Semi-Final first leg against Arsenal on 12 January 2011. Peters marked Andrei Arshavin so well it forced Arsène Wenger to sub the Russian Winger out in the second half, Ipswich won the game 1–0. Following the hire of Paul Jewell as manager in early January, Peters began to struggle for first team selection, during a span of 14 league matches Peters was only given one game playing for 12 minutes against Doncaster Rovers on 15 February 2011. Despite this, Peters finished the 2010–11 season, making thirty appearances and scoring once in all competitions.

Peters made his 2011–12 season debut in the League Cup against Northampton Town on 9 August, losing the game 2–1. After his loan at AFC Bournemouth came to an end, Peters never made appearance for the rest of the 2011–12 season. Peters would be told by Paul Jewell that he was not in his plans for the 2012–13 season and he was formally released from his contract by mutual consent on 23 August 2012, ending his seven years association with the club. It came after Jewell told both Peters and Nathan Ellington that they can leave the club after being left out the club's pre-season tour.

=== Loan spells ===
After making six appearances in the first half of the 2007–08 season, Peters was loaned out to Yeovil Town until the end of the season despite interests from Romanian side Steaua Bucharest. Peters then made his Yeovil Town debut a few days later on 2 February 2008, in a 2–0 loss against Huddersfield Town. Despite suffering from ankle injury, Peters returned to the first team and then scored in the last game of the season, in a 3–2 loss against Nottingham Forest. After making fourteen appearances and scoring once, the club were keen on signing him for the next season, but it never happened.

After making no appearances for the club in the first half of 2008–09 season, Peters joined Gillingham on a one-month loan on 22 January 2009 transfer window, and made his debut on 24 January 2009 as a substitute in a 1–0 home win over Exeter City. While at Gillingham, Peters was able to join fellow Canadian international Simeon Jackson who scored 14 league goals that season. After making three appearances, his loan spell with Gillingham came to an end after a month there.

However Peters' struggle for playing time at Ipswich Town continued from last season failing to play another minute until he was loaned out in late September to Bournemouth in League One on a month loan. Peters made his debut for the club on 24 September 2011, where he made his first start and played for 84 minutes before being substituted, in a 2–1 loss against Hartlepool United. The loan deal was for a one-month, however, manager Lee Bradbury was impressed with Peters' performance and was able to have the deal extended for a second month. Peters returned to Ipswich in early December after a failed attempt of extending the loan deal, he made eight league and two cup appearances while on loan.

=== Later career ===
After formally leaving Ipswich, Peters went on an extended trial with Yeovil Town, rejoining his former club, in hopes of earning a contract there.

In January 2013, Peters went on trial with Major League Soccer side Vancouver Whitecaps FC in his native Canada. He was released in mid-February.

After almost nine years away from the sport, Peters joined semi-pro side Master's FA of League1 Ontario for the 2021 season.

== International career ==
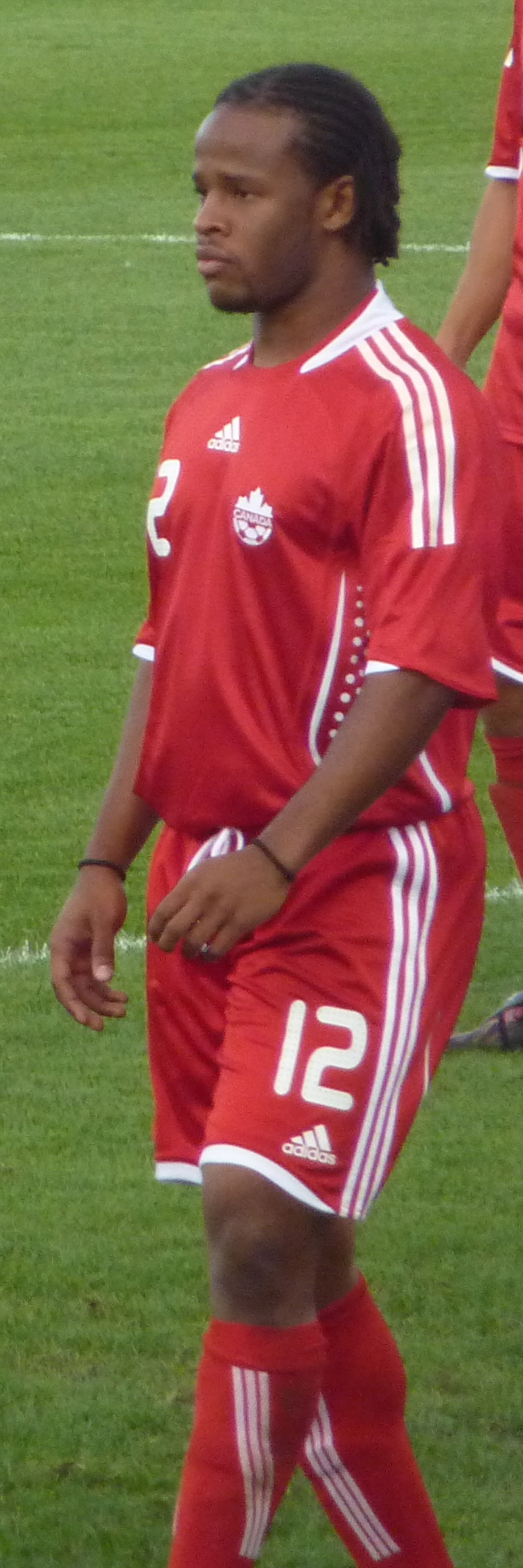
Peters playing against Peru at BMO Field on 4 September 2010.

Peters played for the Canada U20 national team at the 2005 FIFA World Youth Championship and was an ambassador and a member of the Canada U20 squad in the 2007 FIFA World Youth Championship, held in Canada.

He made his debut with the Canada senior national team in August 2004 at the age of 17 against Guatemala. Throughout his international career, he played 26 times for Canada, scoring once. He represented Canada in five FIFA World Cup qualification matches and at the 2005 and 2009 CONCACAF Gold Cups. He scored his first and only goal for Canada in a friendly against Panama on 4 June 2008.

== Career statistics ==
=== Club ===
As of match played on 14 August 2021

Appearances and goals by club, season and competition
Club	Season	League			National cup		League cup		Other		Total	
Club	Season	Division	Apps	Goals	Apps	Goals	Apps	Goals	Apps	Goals	Apps	Goals
Ipswich Town	2005–06	Championship	13	0	0	0	1	0	—		14	0
Ipswich Town	2006–07	Championship	23	2	3	0	0	0	—		26	2
Ipswich Town	2007–08	Championship	5	0	1	0	0	0	—		6	0
Ipswich Town	2008–09	Championship	3	0	0	0	0	0	—		3	0
Ipswich Town	2009–10	Championship	32	1	2	0	0	0	—		34	1
Ipswich Town	2010–11	Championship	23	1	1	0	6	0	—		30	1
Ipswich Town	2011–12	Championship	0	0	0	0	1	0	—		1	0
Ipswich Town	Total		99	4	7	0	8	0	—		114	4
Yeovil Town (loan)	2007–08	League One	14	1	—		—		—		14	1
Gillingham (loan)	2008–09	League Two	3	0	—		—		—		3	0
AFC Bournemouth (loan)	2011–12	League One	8	0	—		—		2 (Note: Appearances in Football League Trophy)	0	10	0
Master's FA	2021	League1 Ontario	2	0	0	0	—		—		2	0
Career total			126	5	7	0	8	0	2	0	143	5

=== International ===
Appearances and goals by national team and year
National team	Year	Apps	Goals
Canada	2004	5	0
Canada	2005	7	0
Canada	2006	1	0
Canada	2008	2	1
Canada	2009	6	0
Canada	2010	2	0
Canada	2011	3	0
Total		26	1

Scores and results list Canada's goal tally first, score column indicates score after each Peters goal.

List of international goals scored by Jaime Peters
No.	Date	Venue	Cap	Opponent	Score	Result	Competition
1	4 June 2008	Lockhart Stadium, Fort Lauderdale, United States	15	Panama	1–0	2–2	Friendly
