= Luciano Civelli =

Argentine footballer (born 1986)

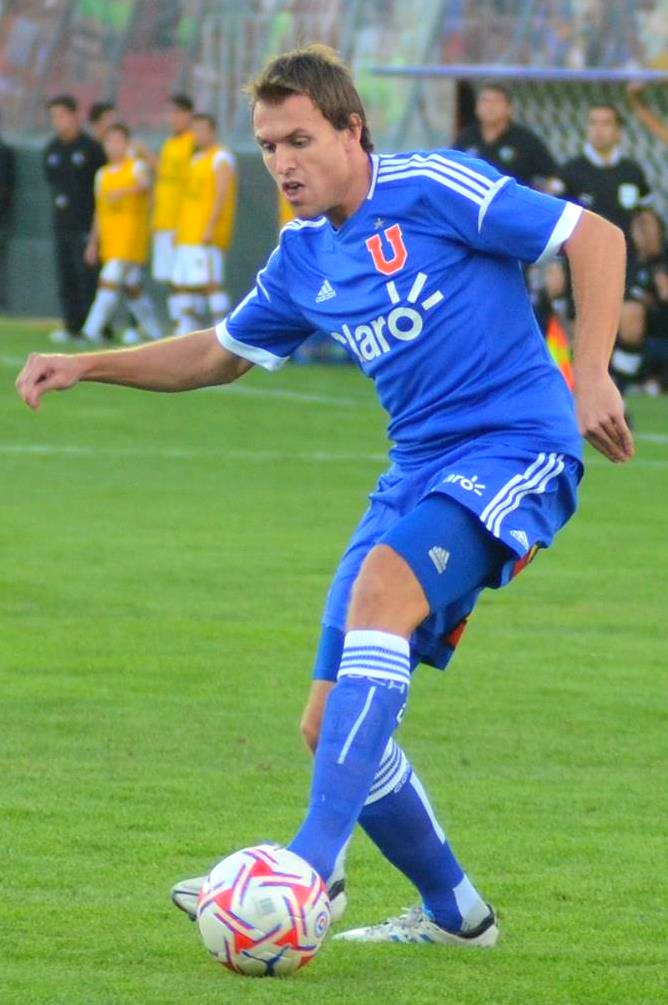
- Civelli playing for Universidad de Chile in 2013

Personal information
- Date of birth: 6 October 1986 (age 40)
- Place of birth: Pehuajó, Argentina
- Height: 1.87 m (6 ft 2 in)
- Position: Midfielder

Youth career
- Banfield

Senior career*
| Years | Team | Apps | (Gls) |
| 2006–2009 | Banfield | 68 | (8) |
| 2009–2011 | Ipswich Town | 17 | (0) |
| 2011–2012 | Libertad | 36 | (5) |
| 2012–2014 | Universidad de Chile | 18 | (3) |
| 2015–2017 | Banfield | 29 | (1) |
| Total | | 168 | (17) |
- * Club domestic league appearances and goals

Luciano Civelli (born 6 October 1986) is an Argentine former professional footballer who played as a midfielder.

== Career ==
=== Banfield ===
Civelli made his breakthrough into the Banfield first team in 2006, and established himself as a member of the first team squad. Whilst with the Argentinian club, Civelli scored eight times in 68 appearances.

=== Ipswich Town ===
On 12 January 2009, Sky Sports News reported that Banfield had accepted a bid of £1 million from Football League Championship side Ipswich Town.

On 28 January it was announced that Civelli had passed a medical and agreed terms on a move to Ipswich. Civelli holds an Italian passport, which allowed him to sign without requiring a work permit. Officially signing for an undisclosed fee, his contract keeps him at Ipswich until summer 2012. He made his debut at Portman Road on 14 February 2009 in a 1–1 draw with Blackpool. He fast became a crowd favourite for his work-rate, effort and determination.

==== Knee injury ====
Civelli suffered a serious knee injury on 17 March 2009 in a league game against Burnley at Portman Road, which ruled him out for the remainder of the 2008–09 season, due to torn and ruptured knee ligaments. Scans later revealed that the injury was very serious, and that Civelli would require surgery on two separate occasions. Firstly, Civelli underwent exploratory surgery to further determine the extent of the injury. On 27 March 2009, Civelli underwent surgery to repair the damaged ligaments in his knee. The surgery was a success, but would rule him out until early 2010.

On 7 September 2009, Civelli said that his rehabilitation from the injury was going very well, and that he was at the stage of doing running and swimming with the club's fitness coach to build up strength in the knee. Civelli also stated that his expectation was to be back playing first team football before Christmas.

However, on 15 December 2009 Civelli suffered a setback in his recovery from the injury, with Ipswich manager, Roy Keane stating that Civelli would not be back before the end of January at the very earliest. In January 2010 Keane confirmed that it is likely that Civelli would not be fit to play until the 2010–11 season due to the severity of his injury and the setbacks that he has experienced. Civelli was allowed home to Argentina for two months to continue his recovery.

==== Return from long-term injury ====
On 7 February 2011, Civelli came on as a substitute in Ipswich's 3–0 victory over Sheffield United. He left the club on 28 July 2011 after he and Ipswich agreed to terminate his contract.

== Personal life ==
Luciano is the younger brother of Renato Civelli who is currently playing for Banfield.
