= Sylvain Legwinski =

French footballer (born 1973)

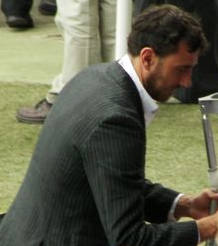
- Legwinski in 2007

Personal information
- Date of birth: 6 October 1973 (age 53)
- Place of birth: Clermont-Ferrand, France
- Height: 1.85 m (6 ft 1 in)
- Position: Midfielder

Senior career*
Years	Team	Apps	(Gls)
1992–1999	Monaco	135	(13)
1999–2001	Bordeaux	49	(2)
2001–2006	Fulham	128	(8)
2006–2008	Ipswich Town	47	(7)
2009	St Neots Town	2	(0)
Total		361	(30)

International career
1996	France U21/Olympic	4	(1)
- * Club domestic league appearances and goals

Sylvain Legwinski (born 6 October 1973) is a French former professional footballer, who played as a midfielder. He is now assistant coach at AS Monaco in France.

Having made a name for himself at AS Monaco and Bordeaux, he played seven years of his professional career in England, collecting more than 200 official appearances for Fulham and Ipswich Town.

== Club career ==
Legwinski was born in Clermont-Ferrand. The son of a basketball player with Polish descent who settled at Vichy, he joined AS Monaco FC's youth system at 18, as Arsène Wenger was the main squad's manager, giving the player his first team debuts shortly after. He developed into a midfield force under Jean Tigana's guidance, scoring nine league goals in 1996–97, as Monaco won the national title.

After two seasons and four games into 2001–02 with FC Girondins de Bordeaux, Legwinski rejoined Tigana at Fulham. At the beginning of the 2006–07 season, new Fulham boss Chris Coleman made it clear that Legwinski did not fit into the side's future plans and, in August 2006, following a successful trial with Ipswich Town, the player signed a two-year contract.

In his first year at the club, Legwinski won the supporter's and manager's Player of the Year Award for 2006–07, netting five league goals. During the campaign, he became the only Ipswich player to have scored against all East Anglian opposition during one season (Norwich City, Colchester United, Southend United and Luton Town).

However, Legwinski found himself out of the picture for much of the following season, still managing to find the net twice, in draws against Queen's Park Rangers and Burnley. Due to the team's extensive midfield, he was told he would not be offered a new contract and, as Town teammate Fabian Wilnis, started looking to the future, working towards his coaching badges.

In September 2008, Legwinski underwent an unsuccessful trial with Swedish team IFK Göteborg. Early in the following year, he had another tryout in the country, with Örgryte IS, which had just won promotion to the top flight.

In March 2009, Legwinski joined St Neots Town as a player/assistant manager, joining player-manager Steve Lomas. Shortly after, definitely retired, he moved to Crystal Palace as a youth coach. He is now assistant coach at AS Monaco in France.

== International career ==
An under-21 international, Legwinski scored once in four matches for the 1996 Summer Olympics quarter-finalists.

== Career statistics ==
Appearances and goals by club, season and competition
Club	Season	League			National Cup		League Cup		Continental		Total	
Club	Season	Division	Apps	Goals	Apps	Goals	Apps	Goals	Apps	Goals	Apps	Goals
Monaco	1992–93	French Division 1	2	0	0	0	0	0	–		2	0
Monaco	1993–94	French Division 1	0	0	0	0	0	0	–		0	0
Monaco	1994–95	French Division 1	21	1	0	0	0	0	–		21	1
Monaco	1995–96	French Division 1	29	2	0	0	0	0	1	0	30	2
Monaco	1996–97	French Division 1	37	9	0	0	0	0	2	1	39	10
Monaco	1997–98	French Division 1	22	0	0	0	0	0	2	0	24	0
Monaco	1998–99	French Division 1	14	1	0	0	0	0	–		14	1
Monaco	1999–2000	French Division 1	10	0	0	0	0	0	2	1	12	1
Monaco	Total		135	13	0	0	0	0	7	2	142	15
Bordeaux	1999–2000	French Division 1	13	1	2	0	0	0	–		15	1
Bordeaux	2000–01	French Division 1	32	1	0	0	–		4	0	36	1
Bordeaux	2001–02	French Division 1	4	0	0	0	0	0	–		4	0
Bordeaux	Total		49	2	2	0	0	0	4	0	55	2
Fulham	2001–02	Premier League	33	3	5	1	2	1	–		40	5
Fulham	2002–03	Premier League	35	4	3	0	0	0	12 (Note: Seven appearances and two goals in UEFA Intertoto Cup, five appearances in UEFA Cup)	2	50	6
Fulham	2003–04	Premier League	32	0	4	0	1	0	–		37	0
Fulham	2004–05	Premier League	15	1	5	0	2	0	–		22	1
Fulham	2005–06	Premier League	13	0	1	0	1	0	–		15	0
Fulham	Total		128	8	18	1	6	1	12	2	164	12
Ipswich Town	2006–07	Championship	32	5	4	0	0	0	–		36	5
Ipswich Town	2007–08	Championship	15	2	0	0	1	0	–		16	2
Ipswich Town	Total		47	7	4	0	1	0	0	0	52	7
Career total			359	30	24	1	7	1	23	4	413	36

== Honours ==
=== Club ===
Monaco

- French League: 1996–97, 1999–2000

Fulham

- UEFA Intertoto Cup: 2002

=== Individual ===
- Ipswich Town Player of the Year: 2006–07
- Ipswich Town Players' Player of the Year: 2006–07
