= James Krause (footballer) =

English footballer

Personal information
- Date of birth: 9 January 1987 (age 39)
- Place of birth: Bury St Edmunds, England
- Position: Defender

Team information
- Current team: Huddersfield Town (first team coach analyst)

Youth career
- Ipswich Town

Senior career*
Years	Team	Apps	(Gls)
2006–2007	Ipswich Town	0	(0)
2006	→ Carlisle United (loan)	3	(0)
2007	Rushden & Diamonds	0	(0)
2007–2008	Crawley Town	14	(0)
2008–2012	Cambridge City	20	(1)
Total		37	(1)

International career^{‡}
- England U17
- * Club domestic league appearances and goals as of 12:28, 15 May 2010 (UTC) ‡ National team caps and goals as of 15:52, 2 January 2007 (UTC)

James Krause (born 9 January 1987) is a former professional footballer. He is a first team coach analyst for EFL League One club Huddersfield Town.

== Playing career ==
Krause, a defender, began his career with Ipswich Town and has represented England at under-17 level.

Krause signed a two-month loan deal with Carlisle United on 21 November 2006 with a view to a permanent deal. On 11 January 2007 his loan deal was extended to the end of the 2006–07 season, but returned to Ipswich on 3 May 2007 after playing only 3 first team League games.

Krause was released by Ipswich in May 2007 and subsequently joined Rushden & Diamonds, but was released in August 2007 and joined Crawley Town.

== Analyst career ==
In July 2023, Krause joined League One side Oxford United as first-team coach analyst following eight years with Arsenal. In November 2023, he followed manager Liam Manning to Championship side Bristol City.

In June 2025, Krause once again followed Manning, appointed first-team coach analyst at Norwich City. In January 2026, he followed Manning again to Huddersfield Town

== Honours ==
Ipswich Town

- FA Youth Cup: 2004–05
