= 2005–06 Ipswich Town F.C. season =

Ipswich Town
2005–06 season
- Chairman: David Sheepshanks
- Manager: Joe Royle
- Stadium: Portman Road
- Championship: 15th
- FA Cup: Third round
- League Cup: First round
- Top goalscorer: League: Nicky Forster (7); All: Nicky Forster (7)
- Highest home attendance: 29,184 (vs Norwich City, 18 Sep 2005, Championship)
- Lowest home attendance: 11,299 (vs Yeovil Town, 23 Aug 2005, League Cup)
- Average home league attendance: 24,251

During the 2005–06 English football season, Ipswich Town competed in the Football League Championship.

== Season summary ==
Although Ipswich had been pre-season promotion favourites for the 2005–06 season, they finished 15th, the club's lowest finish in the English football pyramid since 1966, and Joe Royle resigned on 11 May 2006.

== First-team squad ==
Note: Flags indicate national team as defined under FIFA eligibility rules; some limited exceptions apply. Players may hold more than one non-FIFA nationality.

No.	Pos.	Nation	Player
2	DF	NED	Fabian Wilnis
3	DF	ENG	Matt Richards
4	DF	CAN	Jason de Vos
5	DF	SCO	Jay McEveley (on loan from Blackburn Rovers)
6	DF	ENG	Richard Naylor
7	MF	NIR	Jim Magilton (captain)
8	FW	ENG	Nicky Forster
9	FW	ENG	Sam Parkin
10	MF	ENG	Darren Currie
11	MF	NIR	Kevin Horlock
12	MF	CAN	Jaime Peters
14	MF	ENG	Dean McDonald
15	DF	ESP	Sito

No.	Pos.	Nation	Player
17	FW	ENG	Dean Bowditch
19	MF	FRA	Jimmy Juan (on loan from Monaco)
23	MF	IRL	Owen Garvan
26	DF	ENG	Scott Barron
27	FW	NOR	Vemund Brekke Skard
29	FW	ENG	Danny Haynes
30	MF	WAL	Gavin Williams
31	GK	IRL	Shane Supple
32	FW	IRL	Alan Lee
33	MF	ENG	Ian Westlake
34	GK	WAL	Lewis Price
35	FW	JAM	Ricardo Fuller (on loan from Southampton)

=== Left club during season ===
Note: Flags indicate national team as defined under FIFA eligibility rules; some limited exceptions apply. Players may hold more than one non-FIFA nationality.

No.	Pos.	Nation	Player
18	DF	RSA	Mark Fish (on loan from Charlton Athletic)
18	FW	ENG	Adam Proudlock (released)

No.	Pos.	Nation	Player
24	FW	IRL	Billy Clarke (on loan to Colchester United)

=== Reserve squad ===
Note: Flags indicate national team as defined under FIFA eligibility rules; some limited exceptions apply. Players may hold more than one non-FIFA nationality.

No.	Pos.	Nation	Player
16	DF	NIR	Chris Casement
20	DF	ENG	Aidan Collins
21	DF	ENG	Scott Mitchell
22	FW	ENG	Darryl Knights
25	GK	ENG	Andy Rhodes

No.	Pos.	Nation	Player
28	DF	IRL	Gerard Nash
35	DF	ENG	James Krause
36	MF	ENG	Liam Trotter
—	FW	ENG	Charlie Sheringham

== Pre-season ==
Ipswich spent time on a pre-season tour of Hungary in July 2005 as part of preparations for the 2005–06 season.

=== Legend ===
Win	Draw	Loss

Date	Opponent	Venue	Result	Attendance	Scorers
13 July 2005	Cambridge United	A	3–0	Unknown	Forster, Bowditch (2)
16 July 2005	Boston United	A	5–2	Unknown	Forster (2), Garvan, Magilton, White (o.g.)
19 July 2005	Rangers	H	0–2	17,202	
22 July 2005	Újpest	A	2–3	Unknown	Currie (pen), Bowditch
24 July 2005	Diósgyőri	A	0–1	Unknown	
29 July 2005	Atlético Madrid	H	1–2	9,305	Westlake
3 August 2005	Colchester United	A	3–1	3,186	McDonald (2), Currie

== Competitions ==
=== Football League Championship ===
==== League table ====
Pos	Team	Pld	W	D	L	GF	GA	GD	Pts
13	Stoke City	46	17	7	22	54	63	−9	58
14	Plymouth Argyle	46	13	17	16	39	46	−7	56
15	Ipswich Town	46	14	14	18	53	66	−13	56
16	Leicester City	46	13	15	18	51	59	−8	54
17	Burnley	46	14	12	20	46	54	−8	54

Updated to match(es) played on 2 December 2011. Source: RSSSF
Rules for classification: 1) points; 2) goal difference; 3) number of goals scored.

==== Legend ====
Win	Draw	Loss

Ipswich Town's score comes first

==== Matches ====
Date	Opponent	Venue	Result	Attendance	Scorers
6 August 2005	Cardiff City	H	1–0	24,292	Forster
9 August 2005	Queens Park Rangers	A	1–2	14,632	Parkin
13 August 2005	Leicester City	A	0–0	21,879	
20 August 2005	Sheffield Wednesday	H	2–1	24,238	Naylor, Westlake
27 August 2005	Millwall	A	2–1	8,277	Currie, Parkin
29 August 2005	Preston North End	H	0–4	22,551	
10 September 2005	Sheffield United	A	0–2	21,054	
13 September 2005	Southampton	H	2–2	22,997	Naylor, Garvan
18 September 2005	Norwich City	H	0–1	29,184	
24 September 2005	Leeds United	A	2–0	21,626	Parkin (2)
27 September 2005	Burnley	A	0–3	10,496	
1 October 2005	Crewe Alexandra	H	2–1	23,145	Currie, Forster
16 October 2005	Reading	A	0–2	17,581	
18 October 2005	Coventry City	H	2–2	22,656	Currie, Juan
22 October 2005	Watford	H	0–1	24,069	
29 October 2005	Brighton & Hove Albion	A	1–1	6,867	Parkin
2 November 2005	Derby County	A	3–3	21,598	Naylor, Magilton, Richards
5 November 2005	Plymouth Argyle	H	3–1	23,083	McEveley, Juan, Richards (pen)
19 November 2005	Coventry City	A	1–1	18,316	Williams
22 November 2005	Reading	H	0–3	22,621	
28 November 2005	Cardiff City	A	1–2	8,724	Juan
3 December 2005	Wolverhampton Wanderers	H	1–1	23,563	Richards (pen)
10 December 2005	Queens Park Rangers	H	2–2	24,628	de Vos, Haynes
17 December 2005	Sheffield Wednesday	A	1–0	21,716	Forster
26 December 2005	Crystal Palace	H	0–2	27,392	
28 December 2005	Hull City	A	0–2	20,124	
31 December 2005	Luton Town	H	1–0	23,957	Westlake
2 January 2006	Stoke City	A	2–2	14,493	de Vos, Wilnis
14 January 2006	Sheffield United	H	1–1	23,794	Juan
21 January 2006	Southampton	A	2–0	22,250	Lee
31 January 2006	Leeds United	H	1–1	25,845	Haynes
4 February 2006	Norwich City	A	2–1	21,385	Juan, Doherty (own goal)
11 February 2006	Burnley	H	2–1	24,482	Lee, Richards (pen)
14 February 2006	Crewe Alexandra	A	2–1	5,686	Lee, McDonald
18 February 2006	Wolverhampton Wanderers	A	0–1	23,561	
25 February 2006	Leicester City	H	2–0	24,861	Garvan, Fuller
11 March 2006	Millwall	H	1–1	24,864	Garvan
14 March 2006	Preston North End	A	1–3	14,507	de Vos
18 March 2006	Crystal Palace	A	2–2	22,076	Soares (own goal), Fuller
25 March 2006	Hull City	H	1–1	23,968	Currie
1 April 2006	Luton Town	A	0–1	9,820	
8 April 2006	Stoke City	H	1–4	23,592	Haynes
15 April 2006	Brighton & Hove Albion	H	1–2	21,865	Forster
17 April 2006	Watford	A	1–2	16,721	Forster
22 April 2006	Derby County	H	2–0	24,067	Forster, Currie
30 April 2006	Plymouth Argyle	A	1–2	15,921	Forster

=== FA Cup ===
Round	Date	Opponent	Venue	Result	Attendance	Goalscorers
R3	8 January 2006	Portsmouth	H	0–1	15,593	

=== League Cup ===
Round	Date	Opponent	Venue	Result	Attendance	Goalscorers
R1	23 August 2005	Yeovil Town	H	0–2	11,299	

== Transfers ==
=== Transfers in ===
Date	Pos	Name	From	Fee	Ref
22 June 2005	FW	(England) Nicky Forster	(England) Reading	Free transfer	
23 June 2005	FW	(England) Sam Parkin	(England) Swindon Town	£550,000	
1 July 2005	DF	(Spain) Sito	(Spain) Racing de Ferrol	Free transfer	
2 August 2005	DF	(Canada) Jaime Peters	(Germany) 1. FC Kaiserslautern	Free transfer	
3 January 2006	MF	(Wales) Gavin Williams	(England) West Ham United	£300,000	
3 January 2006	FW	(England) Adam Proudlock	(England) Sheffield Wednesday	Undisclosed	
6 January 2006	FW	(Norway) Vemund Brekke Skard	(Norway) Brumunddal	Free transfer	
10 January 2006	FW	(Republic of Ireland) Alan Lee	(Wales) Cardiff City	£100,000	

=== Loans in ===
Date from	Pos	Name	From	Date until	Ref
1 July 2005	MF	(France) Jimmy Juan	(France) Monaco	30 June 2006	
8 August 2005	DF	(South Africa) Mark Fish	(England) Charlton Athletic	23 August 2005	
29 August 2005	DF	(Scotland) Jay McEveley	(England) Blackburn Rovers	30 June 2006	
10 November 2005	MF	(Wales) Gavin Wiliams	(England) West Ham United	3 January 2006	
16 October 2005	FW	(England) Adam Proudlock	(England) Sheffield Wednesday	3 January 2006	
16 February 2006	FW	(Jamaica) Ricardo Fuller	(England) Southampton	30 June 2006	

=== Transfers out ===
Date	Pos	Name	To	Fee	Ref
1 July 2005	DF	(England) Jerrome Sobers	(England) Chelmsford City	Free transfer	
1 July 2005	DF	(England) Ben Patten	(England) Chelmsford City	Free transfer	
1 July 2005	MF	(England) Adem Atay	Free agent	Released	
1 July 2005	MF	(England) Liam Manning	(England) Bishop's Stortford	Free transfer	
1 July 2005	MF	(England) Fraser Beveridge	Free agent	Released	
1 July 2005	DF	(England) Daniel Flack	(England) Whitton United	Free transfer	
23 June 2005	MF	(England) Tommy Miller	(England) Sunderland	Free transfer	
1 July 2005	DF	(Guinea) Drissa Diallo	(England) Sheffield Wednesday	Free transfer	
1 July 2005	FW	(England) Darren Bent	(England) Charlton Athletic	£2,500,000	
1 July 2005	FW	(Finland) Shefki Kuqi	(England) Blackburn Rovers	Free transfer	
28 July 2005	GK	(England) Kelvin Davis	(England) Sunderland	£1,250,000	
20 August 2005	FW	(Spain) Pablo Couñago	(Spain) Málaga	Undisclosed	
17 January 2006	MF	(Scotland) Liam Craig	(Scotland) Falkirk	Free transfer	
24 March 2005	FW	(England) Adam Proudlock	Free agent	Released	

=== Loans out ===
Date from	Pos	Name	From	Date until	Ref
16 November 2005	MF	(England) Dean McDonald	(England) Hartlepool United	18 December 2005	
10 January 2006	DF	(Republic of Ireland) Gerard Nash	(England) Hartlepool United	30 January 2006	
13 January 2006	DF	(England) Aidan Collins	(England) Wycombe Wanderers	13 March 2006	
26 January 2006	FW	(England) Dean Bowditch	(England) Wycombe Wanderers	31 March 2006	
10 February 2006	MF	(Northern Ireland) Kevin Horlock	(England) Doncaster Rovers	16 April 2006	
22 March 2006	FW	(Republic of Ireland) Billy Clarke	(England) Colchester United	7 May 2006	
23 March 2006	DF	(Republic of Ireland) Gerard Nash	(England) Southend United	7 May 2006	

== Squad statistics ==
All statistics updated as of end of season

=== Appearances and goals ===
No.	Pos	Nat	Player	Total		Championship		FA Cup		League Cup	
No.	Pos	Nat	Player	Apps	Goals	Apps	Goals	Apps	Goals	Apps	Goals
Goalkeepers
31	GK	(Republic of Ireland) IRL	Shane Supple	23	0	21+1	0	1	0	0	0
34	GK	(Wales) WAL	Lewis Price	26	0	25	0	0	0	1	0
Defenders
2	DF	(Netherlands) NED	Fabian Wilnis	37	1	33+2	1	1	0	0+1	0
3	DF	(England) ENG	Matt Richards	40	4	31+7	4	1	0	1	0
4	DF	(Canada) CAN	Jason de Vos	42	3	41	3	1	0	0	0
5	DF	(Scotland) SCO	Jay McEveley	19	1	17+2	1	0	0	0	0
6	DF	(England) ENG	Richard Naylor	44	3	42	3	1	0	1	0
15	DF	(Spain) ESP	Sito	40	0	31+7	0	0+1	0	1	0
16	DF	(Northern Ireland) NIR	Chris Casement	5	0	2+3	0	0	0	0	0
20	DF	(England) ENG	Aidan Collins	4	0	2+1	0	0	0	1	0
26	DF	(England) ENG	Scott Barron	16	0	14+1	0	1	0	0	0
Midfielders
7	MF	(Northern Ireland) NIR	Jim Magilton	35	1	25+9	1	1	0	0	0
10	MF	(England) ENG	Darren Currie	48	5	39+7	5	1	0	1	0
11	MF	(Northern Ireland) NIR	Kevin Horlock	18	0	13+4	0	0	0	1	0
12	MF	(Canada) CAN	Jamie Peters	14	0	4+9	0	0	0	1	0
14	MF	(England) ENG	Dean McDonald	15	1	4+10	1	0	0	1	0
19	MF	(France) FRA	Jimmy Juan	36	5	24+10	5	0+1	0	1	0
23	MF	(Republic of Ireland) IRL	Owen Garvan	33	3	29+2	3	0+1	0	0+1	0
30	MF	(Wales) WAL	Gavin Williams	13	1	12	1	1	0	0	0
33	MF	(England) ENG	Ian Westlake	28	2	19+7	2	1	0	0+1	0
36	MF	(England) ENG	Liam Trotter	1	0	0+1	0	0	0	0	0
Forwards
8	FW	(England) ENG	Nicky Forster	20	7	17+3	7	0	0	0	0
9	FW	(England) ENG	Sam Parkin	20	5	17+3	5	0	0	0	0
17	FW	(England) ENG	Dean Bowditch	22	0	14+7	0	0	0	1	0
27	FW	(Norway) NOR	Vemund Brekke Skard	3	0	2+1	0	0	0	0	0
29	FW	(England) ENG	Danny Haynes	20	4	6+13	4	1	0	0	0
32	FW	(Republic of Ireland) IRL	Alan Lee	14	4	14	4	0	0	0	0
35	FW	(Jamaica) JAM	Ricardo Fuller	3	2	3	2	0	0	0	0
Players transferred out during the season
18	DF	(South Africa) RSA	Mark Fish	1	0	1	0	0	0	0	0
18	FW	(England) ENG	Adam Proudlock	9	0	3+6	0	0	0	0	0
24	FW	(Republic of Ireland) IRL	Billy Clarke	2	0	1+1	0	0	0	0	0

Last updated: end of season
Source: Competitions

=== Goalscorers ===
No.	Pos	Nat	Player	Championship	FA Cup	League Cup	Total
8	FW	(England)	Nicky Forster	7	0	0	7
9	FW	(England)	Sam Parkin	5	0	0	5
10	MF	(England)	Darren Currie	5	0	0	5
19	MF	(France)	Jimmy Juan	5	0	0	5
3	DF	(England)	Matt Richards	4	0	0	4
29	FW	(England)	Danny Haynes	4	0	0	4
32	FW	(Republic of Ireland)	Alan Lee	4	0	0	4
4	DF	(Canada)	Jason de Vos	3	0	0	3
6	DF	(England)	Richard Naylor	3	0	0	3
23	MF	(Republic of Ireland)	Owen Garvan	3	0	0	3
33	MF	(England)	Ian Westlake	2	0	0	2
35	FW	(Jamaica)	Ricardo Fuller	2	0	0	2
2	DF	(Netherlands)	Fabian Wilnis	1	0	0	1
5	DF	(Scotland)	Jay McEveley	1	0	0	1
7	MF	(Northern Ireland)	Jim Magilton	1	0	0	1
14	MF	(England)	Dean McDonald	1	0	0	1
30	MF	(Wales)	Gavin Williams	1	0	0	1
Own goal				2	0	0	2
Total				54	0	0	54

=== Clean sheets ===
No.	Nat	Player	Championship	FA Cup	League Cup	Total
31	(Republic of Ireland)	Shane Supple	5	0	0	5
34	(Wales)	Lewis Price	4	0	0	4
Total			9	0	0	9

=== Disciplinary record ===
No.	Pos.	Name	Championship		FA Cup		League Cup		Total	
No.	Pos.	Name	Yellow card	Red card	Yellow card	Red card	Yellow card	Red card	Yellow card	Red card
2	DF	(Netherlands) Fabian Wilnis	4	1	0	0	0	0	2	1
3	DF	(England) Matt Richards	2	0	0	0	0	0	2	0
4	DF	(Canada) Jason de Vos	5	0	0	0	0	0	5	0
5	DF	(Scotland) Jay McEveley	4	0	0	0	0	0	4	0
6	DF	(England) Richard Naylor	6	2	0	0	0	0	6	2
7	MF	(Northern Ireland) Jim Magilton	1	0	0	0	0	0	1	0
8	FW	(England) Nicky Forster	1	0	0	0	0	0	1	0
9	FW	(England) Sam Parkin	3	0	0	0	0	0	3	0
11	MF	(Northern Ireland) Kevin Horlock	6	0	0	0	0	0	6	0
15	DF	(Spain) Sito	3	1	0	0	1	0	4	1
17	FW	(England) Dean Bowditch	1	0	0	0	0	0	1	0
19	MF	(France) Jimmy Juan	5	0	0	0	0	0	5	0
23	MF	(Republic of Ireland) Owen Garvan	6	0	0	0	0	0	6	0
26	DF	(England) Scott Barron	1	0	0	0	0	0	1	0
29	FW	(England) Danny Haynes	1	0	0	0	0	0	1	0
30	MF	(Wales) Gavin Williams	2	0	1	0	0	0	3	0
32	FW	(Republic of Ireland) Alan Lee	3	0	0	0	0	0	3	0
33	MF	(England) Ian Westlake	2	0	0	0	0	0	2	0
34	GK	(Wales) Lewis Price	1	0	0	0	0	0	1	0
35	FW	(Jamaica) Ricardo Fuller	2	1	0	0	0	0	2	1
Total			59	5	1	0	1	0	61	5

=== Starting 11 ===
Considering starts in all competitions

No.	Pos.	Nat.	Name	MS	Notes
34	GK	(Wales)	Lewis Price	26	Shane Supple has 22 starts
2	RB	(Netherlands)	Fabian Wilnis	34	
4	CB	(Canada)	Jason de Vos	42	
6	CB	(England)	Richard Naylor	44	
15	LB	(Spain)	Sito	32	
10	RM	(England)	Darren Currie	41	
23	CM	(Republic of Ireland)	Owen Garvan	29	
7	CM	(Northern Ireland)	Jim Magilton	26	Jimmy Juan has 25 starts
3	LM	(England)	Matt Richards	33	
8	CF	(England)	Nicky Forster	11	Dean Bowditch has 15 starts
9	CF	(England)	Sam Parkin	17	Alan Lee has 14 starts

4–4–2 Formation

== Awards ==
=== Player awards ===
Award	Player	Ref
Player of the Year	(Netherlands) Fabian Wilnis	
Players' Player of the Year	(Canada) Jason de Vos	
Young Player of the Year	(Northern Ireland) Chris Casement	
Goal of the Season	(England) Sam Parkin	
