= 2004–05 Ipswich Town F.C. season =

Ipswich Town
2004–05 season
- Chairman: David Sheepshanks
- Manager: Joe Royle
- Stadium: Portman Road
- Championship: 3rd
- FA Cup: Third round
- League Cup: Second round
- Play-offs: Semi-finals
- Top goalscorer: League: Darren Bent (20); All: Darren Bent / Shefki Kuqi (20)
- Highest home attendance: 30,010 (vs West Ham United, 18 May 2005, Championship Play-offs)
- Lowest home attendance: 10,190 (vs Brentford, 24 Aug 2004, League Cup)
- Average home league attendance: 25,651
Home colours	Away colours

During the 2004–05 English football season, Ipswich Town competed in the Football League Championship.

== Season summary ==
Ipswich missed automatic promotion in the 2004–05 season, finishing third, only two points behind second-placed Wigan Athletic. Again, they lost to West Ham United in the play off semi-finals, this time by a 4–2 aggregate score.

== First-team squad ==
Note: Flags indicate national team as defined under FIFA eligibility rules; some limited exceptions apply. Players may hold more than one non-FIFA nationality.

No.	Pos.	Nation	Player
1	GK	ENG	Kelvin Davis
2	DF	NED	Fabian Wilnis
3	DF	ENG	Matt Richards
4	DF	CAN	Jason de Vos
5	DF	GUI	Drissa Diallo
6	DF	ENG	Richard Naylor
7	MF	NIR	Jim Magilton (captain)
8	MF	ENG	Tommy Miller
9	FW	ESP	Pablo Couñago

No.	Pos.	Nation	Player
10	MF	ENG	Darren Currie
11	MF	NIR	Kevin Horlock
12	DF	USA	Danny Karbassiyoon (on loan from Arsenal)
14	FW	ENG	James Scowcroft (on loan from Leicester City)
16	DF	ENG	David Unsworth (on loan from Portsmouth)
18	FW	ENG	Darren Bent
32	FW	FIN	Shefki Kuqi
33	MF	ENG	Ian Westlake
34	GK	WAL	Lewis Price

=== Left club during season ===
Note: Flags indicate national team as defined under FIFA eligibility rules; some limited exceptions apply. Players may hold more than one non-FIFA nationality.

No. / Pos. / Nation / Player; 10 / MF / ENG / Tony Dinning (on loan from Wigan Athletic)	No. / Pos. / Nation / Player; 17 / FW / ENG / Dean Bowditch (on loan to Burnley)

=== Reserve squad ===
Note: Flags indicate national team as defined under FIFA eligibility rules; some limited exceptions apply. Players may hold more than one non-FIFA nationality.

No.	Pos.	Nation	Player
15	MF	ENG	Dean McDonald
19	MF	FRA	Jimmy Juan (on loan from AS Monaco)
20	DF	ENG	Aidan Collins
21	DF	ENG	Scott Mitchell
22	FW	ENG	Darryl Knights
23	MF	IRL	Owen Garvan
24	FW	IRL	Billy Clarke

No.	Pos.	Nation	Player
26	DF	ENG	Scott Barron
27	MF	ENG	Adem Atay
28	DF	IRL	Gerard Nash
29	DF	ENG	Ben Patten
30	DF	ENG	Jerrome Sobers
31	GK	IRL	Shane Supple

== Pre-season ==
Ipswich traveled to Denmark for a pre-season tour in July 2004. Ipswich also played a friendly match against Newcastle United on 28 July, a testimonial match which was played in honour of former assistant manager and player Dale Roberts.

=== Legend ===
Win	Draw	Loss

Date	Opponent	Venue	Result	Attendance	Scorers
10 July 2004	Peterborough United	A	2–1	Unknown	Couñago, Westlake
13 July 2004	Randers	A	0–0	Unknown	
16 July 2004	AaB	A	0–2	Unknown	
21 July 2004	Oxford United	A	5–1	Unknown	Miller (2), Bent, Couñago, Magilton
24 July 2004	Crystal Palace	H	2–1	Unknown	Diallo, Bowditch
28 July 2004	Newcastle United	H	2–1	24,644	Kuqi, Couñago
2 August 2004	Osasuna	H	2–1	4,817	Couñago, Kuqi

== Competitions ==
=== Football League Championship ===
==== League table ====
Pos	Team	Pld	W	D	L	GF	GA	GD	Pts	Promotion, qualification or relegation
1	Sunderland (C, P)	46	29	7	10	76	41	+35	94	Promotion to the FA Premier League
2	Wigan Athletic (P)	46	25	12	9	79	35	+44	87	Promotion to the FA Premier League
3	Ipswich Town	46	24	13	9	85	56	+29	85	Qualification for Championship play-offs
4	Derby County	46	22	10	14	71	60	+11	76	Qualification for Championship play-offs
5	Preston North End	46	21	12	13	67	58	+9	75	Qualification for Championship play-offs

Updated to match(es) played on 9 December 2011. Source: Football League Tables
Rules for classification: 1) points; 2) goal difference; 3) number of goals scored.
(C) Champions; (P) Promoted

==== Legend ====
Win	Draw	Loss

Ipswich Town's score comes first

==== Matches ====
Date	Opponent	Venue	Result	Attendance	Scorers
7 August 2004	Gillingham	H	2–1	23,130	Naylor, Bowditch
11 August 2004	Nottingham Forest	A	1–1	21,125	Bent
14 August 2004	Derby County	A	2–3	22,234	Miller, Bowditch
21 August 2004	Cardiff City	H	3–1	21,828	Bent, Miller, Westlake
28 August 2004	Rotherham United	A	2–0	5,504	Kuqi (2)
30 August 2004	Wolverhampton Wanderers	H	2–1	24,590	Bent, Miller
12 September 2004	Millwall	H	2–0	26,790	Bent, Couñago
14 September 2004	Stoke City	A	2–3	23,029	Westlake, de Vos
18 September 2004	West Ham United	A	1–1	28,812	Couñago
25 September 2004	Plymouth Argyle	H	3–2	23,270	de Vos, Kuqi (2)
28 September 2004	Reading	H	1–1	23,167	Kuqi
3 October 2004	Coventry City	A	2–1	12,608	Bowditch, Mills (own goal)
16 October 2004	Burnley	H	1–1	23,183	Richards
19 October 2004	Leicester City	A	2–2	22,497	Westlake, Heath (own goal)
23 October 2004	Watford	A	2–2	15,894	Westlake, Bent
30 October 2004	Preston North End	H	3–0	23,745	Kuqi, Miller, Bent
2 November 2004	Sheffield United	H	5–1	22,977	Miller, Kuqi (2), Naylor, Westlake
6 November 2004	Burnley	A	2–0	11,969	Bent (2)
13 November 2004	Leeds United	H	1–0	29,955	Bent
21 November 2004	Sunderland	A	0–2	31,723	
27 November 2004	Brighton & Hove Albion	H	1–0	26,269	Kuqi
4 December 2004	Crewe Alexandra	A	2–2	7,236	Naylor, Bent
11 December 2004	Queens Park Rangers	A	4–2	18,231	de Vos, Bent, Currie, Kuqi
21 December 2004	Wigan Athletic	H	2–1	28,286	Naylor, Bent
26 December 2004	Millwall	A	1–3	14,532	Kuqi
28 December 2004	Stoke City	H	1–0	26,217	Kuqi
1 January 2005	West Ham United	H	0–2	30,003	
3 January 2005	Plymouth Argyle	A	2–1	17,923	Currie (2)
15 January 2005	Coventry City	H	3–2	23,670	Bent (2), Kuqi
22 January 2005	Reading	A	1–1	23,203	Bent
5 February 2005	Sheffield United	A	2–0	20,680	Unsworth, Kuqi
12 February 2005	Leicester City	H	2–1	27,392	de Vries (own goal), Kuqi
18 February 2005	Preston North End	A	1–1	14,418	Miller
22 February 2005	Watford	H	1–2	23,993	Miller
26 February 2005	Queens Park Rangers	H	0–2	29,008	
5 March 2005	Wigan Athletic	A	0–1	16,744	
12 March 2005	Nottingham Forest	H	6–0	25,765	Naylor, Westlake, Miller (2), Kuqi, Bent
15 March 2005	Cardiff City	A	1–0	11,768	Miller
19 March 2005	Gillingham	A	0–0	9,311	
2 April 2005	Derby County	H	3–2	28,796	Magilton, Bent, Miller
5 April 2005	Rotherham United	H	4–3	26,017	Westlake, Bent (2), Magilton
11 April 2005	Wolverhampton Wanderers	A	0–2	25,882	
17 April 2005	Sunderland	H	2–2	29,230	Naylor, Bent
23 April 2005	Leeds United	A	1–1	29,607	Kuqi
30 April 2005	Crewe Alexandra	H	5–1	28,244	Kuqi, Magilton, Miller (2), Couñago
8 May 2005	Brighton & Hove Albion	A	1–1	6,848	Kuqi

=== Championship play-offs ===
Round	Date	Opponent	Venue	Result	Attendance	Goalscorers
SF 1st Leg	14 May 2005	West Ham United	A	2–2	33,723	Walker (own goal), Kuqi
SF 2nd Leg	18 May 2005	West Ham United	H	0–2	30,010	

=== FA Cup ===
Round	Date	Opponent	Venue	Result	Attendance	Goalscorers
R3	8 January 2005	Bolton Wanderers	H	1–3	20,080	Miller

=== League Cup ===
Round	Date	Opponent	Venue	Result	Attendance	Goalscorers
R1	24 August 2004	Brentford	H	2–0	10,190	Westlake, Miller
R2	21 September 2004	Doncaster Rovers	A	0–2	6,020	

== Transfers ==
=== Transfers in ===
Date	Pos	Name	From	Fee	Ref
1 July 2004	DF	(Canada) Jason de Vos	(England) Wigan Athletic	Free transfer	
1 July 2004	DF	(England) Jerrome Sobers	(England) Ford United	£10,000	
9 July 2004	MF	(Northern Ireland) Kevin Horlock	(England) West Ham United	Free transfer	
10 December 2004	MF	(England) Darren Currie	(England) Brighton & Hove Albion	£250,000	

=== Loans in ===
Date from	Pos	Name	From	Date until	Ref
10 August 2004	MF	(England) Tony Dinning	(England) Wigan Athletic	29 September 2004	
21 December 2004	DF	(United States) Danny Karbassiyoon	(England) Arsenal	30 June 2005	
27 January 2005	DF	(England) David Unsworth	(England) Portsmouth	30 June 2005	
31 January 2005	MF	(France) Jimmy Juan	(France) Monaco	30 June 2005	
14 February 2005	FW	(England) James Scowcroft	(England) Leicester City	30 June 2005	

=== Transfers out ===
Date	Pos	Name	To	Fee	Ref
8 May 2004	DF	(England) John McGreal	(England) Burnley	Free transfer	
23 June 2004	FW	(England) Marcus Bent	(England) Everton	£450,000	
1 July 2004	MF	(England) Jermaine Wright	(England) Leeds United	Free transfer	
1 July 2004	DF	(Cape Verde) Georges Santos	(England) Queens Park Rangers	Free transfer	
1 July 2004	MF	(Netherlands) Martijn Reuser	(Netherlands) Willem II	Free transfer	
1 July 2004	MF	(England) Chris Bart-Williams	(Cyprus) APOEL	Free transfer	
2 August 2004	DF	(England) Chris Makin	(England) Leicester City	Free transfer	
15 September 2004	FW	(England) Alun Armstrong	(England) Darlington	Free transfer	
9 December 2004	FW	(England) Craig Reid	(England) Coventry City	Free transfer	
14 January 2005	FW	(England) Antonio Murray	(Scotland) Hibernian	Undisclosed	
31 January 2005	DF	(England) Chris Hogg	(Scotland) Hibernian	Free transfer	

=== Loans out ===
Date from	Pos	Name	From	Date until	Ref
19 November 2004	GK	(Wales) Lewis Price	(England) Cambridge United	29 December 2004	
9 March 2005	FW	(England) Dean Bowditch	(England) Burnley	9 May 2005	
24 March 2005	DF	(England) Jerrome Sobers	(England) Brentford	16 May 2005	

== Squad statistics ==
All statistics updated as of end of season

=== Appearances and goals ===
No.	Pos	Nat	Player	Total		Championship		FA Cup		League Cup		Play-offs	
No.	Pos	Nat	Player	Apps	Goals	Apps	Goals	Apps	Goals	Apps	Goals	Apps	Goals
Goalkeepers
1	GK	(England) ENG	Kelvin Davis	42	0	39	0	1	0	0	0	2	0
34	GK	(Wales) WAL	Lewis Price	10	0	7+1	0	0	0	2	0	0	0
Defenders
2	DF	(Netherlands) NED	Fabian Wilnis	44	0	40+1	0	1	0	0	0	2	0
3	DF	(England) ENG	Matt Richards	28	1	15+9	1	0+1	0	1	0	1+1	0
4	DF	(Canada) CAN	Jason de Vos	49	3	45	3	1	0	1	0	2	0
5	DF	(Guinea) GUI	Drissa Diallo	29	0	23+3	0	0	0	2	0	1	0
6	DF	(England) ENG	Richard Naylor	50	6	46	6	0	0	2	0	2	0
15	DF	(United States) USA	Danny Karbassiyoon	6	0	3+2	0	1	0	0	0	0	0
16	DF	(England) ENG	David Unsworth	16	1	16	1	0	0	0	0	0	0
21	DF	(England) ENG	Scott Mitchell	2	0	0	0	1	0	1	0	0	0
26	DF	(England) ENG	Scott Barron	1	0	0	0	0	0	1	0	0	0
Midfielders
7	MF	(Northern Ireland) NIR	Jim Magilton	44	3	33+6	3	1	0	2	0	2	0
8	MF	(England) ENG	Tommy Miller	50	15	45	13	0+1	1	0+2	1	2	0
10	MF	(England) ENG	Darren Currie	27	3	19+5	3	1	0	0	0	1+1	0
11	MF	(Northern Ireland) NIR	Kevin Horlock	44	0	33+8	0	1	0	0+1	0	1	0
33	MF	(England) ENG	Ian Westlake	50	8	41+4	7	1	0	2	1	2	0
Forwards
9	FW	(Spain) ESP	Pablo Couñago	22	3	4+15	3	0+1	0	2	0	0	0
14	FW	(England) ENG	James Scowcroft	9	0	3+6	0	0	0	0	0	0	0
18	FW	(England) ENG	Darren Bent	50	20	45	20	1	0	2	0	2	0
22	FW	(England) ENG	Darryl Knights	1	0	0+1	0	0	0	0	0	0	0
32	FW	(Finland) FIN	Shefki Kuqi	48	20	40+3	19	1	0	0+2	0	2	1
Players transferred/loaned out during the season
10	MF	(England) ENG	Tony Dinning	9	0	3+4	0	0	0	2	0	0	0
17	FW	(England) ENG	Dean Bowditch	24	3	6+15	3	0	0	2	0	0+1	0

Last updated: end of season
Source: Competitions

=== Goalscorers ===
No.	Pos	Nat	Player	Championship	FA Cup	League Cup	Play-offs	Total
18	FW	(England)	Darren Bent	20	0	0	0	20
32	FW	(Finland)	Shefki Kuqi	19	0	0	1	20
8	MF	(England)	Tommy Miller	13	1	1	0	15
33	MF	(England)	Ian Westlake	7	0	1	0	8
6	DF	(England)	Richard Naylor	6	0	0	0	6
4	DF	(Canada)	Jason de Vos	3	0	0	0	3
7	MF	(Northern Ireland)	Jim Magilton	3	0	0	0	3
9	FW	(Spain)	Pablo Couñago	3	0	0	0	3
10	MF	(England)	Darren Currie	3	0	0	0	3
17	FW	(England)	Dean Bowditch	3	0	0	0	3
3	DF	(England)	Matt Richards	1	0	0	0	1
16	DF	(England)	David Unsworth	1	0	0	0	1
Own goal				3	0	0	1	0
Total				85	1	2	2	90

=== Clean sheets ===
No.	Nat	Player	Championship	FA Cup	League Cup	Play-offs	Total
1	(England)	Kelvin Davis	10	0	0	0	10
34	(Wales)	Lewis Price	1	0	1	0	2
Total			11	0	1	0	12

=== Disciplinary record ===
No.	Pos.	Name	Championship		FA Cup		League Cup		Play-offs		Total	
No.	Pos.	Name	Yellow card	Red card	Yellow card	Red card	Yellow card	Red card	Yellow card	Red card	Yellow card	Red card
2	DF	(Netherlands) Fabian Wilnis	4	1	0	0	0	0	1	0	5	1
3	DF	(England) Matt Richards	1	0	0	0	0	0	0	0	1	0
4	DF	(Canada) Jason de Vos	6	0	0	0	0	0	0	0	6	0
5	DF	(Guinea) Drissa Diallo	4	0	0	0	0	0	0	0	4	0
6	DF	(England) Richard Naylor	5	0	0	0	0	0	1	0	5	0
7	MF	(Northern Ireland) Jim Magilton	4	0	0	0	0	0	0	0	4	0
8	MF	(England) Tommy Miller	3	0	0	0	0	0	0	0	3	0
9	FW	(Spain) Pablo Couñago	2	0	0	0	0	0	0	0	2	0
10	MF	(England) Tony Dinning	1	0	0	0	1	0	0	0	2	0
11	MF	(Northern Ireland) Kevin Horlock	6	0	0	0	0	0	0	0	6	0
12	DF	(United States) Danny Karbassiyoon	1	0	0	0	0	0	0	0	1	0
14	FW	(England) James Scowcroft	4	0	0	0	0	0	0	0	4	0
16	DF	(England) David Unsworth	3	0	0	0	0	0	0	0	3	0
17	FW	(England) Dean Bowditch	1	0	0	0	0	0	0	0	1	0
18	FW	(England) Darren Bent	1	0	0	0	0	0	0	0	1	0
32	FW	(Finland) Shefki Kuqi	5	0	0	0	0	0	0	0	5	0
33	MF	(England) Ian Westlake	4	0	0	0	0	0	1	0	5	0
Total			55	1	0	0	1	0	3	0	59	1

=== Starting 11 ===
Considering starts in all competitions

No.	Pos.	Nat.	Name	MS	Notes
1	GK	(England)	Kelvin Davis	42	
5	RB	(Guinea)	Drissa Diallo	26	
4	CB	(Canada)	Jason de Vos	49	
6	CB	(England)	Richard Naylor	50	
2	LB	(Netherlands)	Fabian Wilnis	43	
11	RM	(Northern Ireland)	Kevin Horlock	35	
8	CM	(England)	Tommy Miller	47	
7	CM	(Northern Ireland)	Jim Magilton	26	
33	LM	(England)	Ian Westlake	46	
18	CF	(England)	Darren Bent	50	
32	CF	(Finland)	Shefki Kuqi	43	

4–4–2 Formation

== Awards ==
=== Player awards ===
Award	Player	Ref
Player of the Year	(Finland) Shefki Kuqi	
Players' Player of the Year	(England) Kelvin Davis	
Young Player of the Year	(Republic of Ireland) Billy Clarke	

=== Football League Championship Manager of the Month ===
Month	Manager	Ref
November	(England) Joe Royle	

=== Football League Championship Player of the Month ===
Month	Player	Ref
October	(Northern Ireland) Kevin Horlock	

=== PFA Championship Team of the Year ===
Player	Ref
(England) Kelvin Davis	
