= Fabian Wilnis =

Surinamese footballer (born 1970)

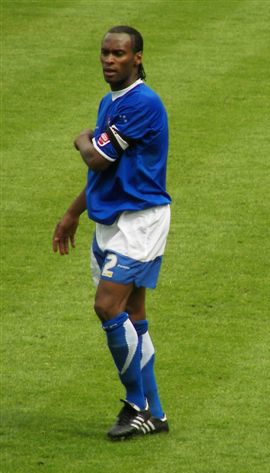
- Wilnis playing for Ipswich Town in 2007

Personal information
- Full name: Fabian Wilnis
- Date of birth: 23 August 1970 (age 56)
- Place of birth: Paramaribo, Suriname
- Height: 5 ft 11 in (1.80 m)
- Position: Full-back

Youth career
- 1985–1991: Sparta Rotterdam

Senior career*
Years	Team	Apps	(Gls)
1991–1995	NAC Breda	134	(3)
1995–1999	De Graafschap	107	(1)
1999–2008	Ipswich Town	282	(6)
2008–2009	Grays Athletic	33	(0)
2014	Leiston		
Total		556	(10)
- * Club domestic league appearances and goals

Fabian Wilnis (born 23 August 1970) is a Surinamese former professional footballer who played as a full-back. He played for NAC Breda, De Graafschap, Ipswich Town, Grays Athletic and Leiston.

Wilnis started his career with the Sparta Rotterdam academy. After leaving the youth system at Sparta Rotterdam he joined NAC Breda in 1991. He spent four years at NAC Breda, making over one hundred appearances before joining De Graafschap in 1995. Wilnis also spent four years at De Graafschap and made over one hundred appearances for the club. In 1999, Wilnis joined English side Ipswich Town. He spent ten years at Ipswich, making over three hundred appearances for the club while also helping Ipswich win promotion to the Premier League in 2000. After leaving Ipswich in 2008, Wilnis joined Grays Athletic where he spent a single season. He retired from playing professional football at the end of the 2008–09 season. On 15 March 2024 he was inducted into the Ipswich Town hall of fame.

== Career ==
=== Early career ===
Wilnis began his career in the Sparta Rotterdam academy, joining the club's youth set up in 1985. After spending six years at Sparta Rotterdam he joined NAC Breda where he spend four years, making over 100 appearances for the club. In 1995 he signed for De Graafschap. He made over 100 appearances for the Dutch club between 1995 and 1999.

=== Ipswich Town ===
Wilnis signed for Ipswich Town in January 1999. The Dutchman joined the Blues from De Graafschap for £200,000, replacing Mauricio Taricco. Wilnis quickly established himself in the side and was a key part of George Burley's side which won promotion to the Premiership. He made his debut for Ipswich in a 1–0 loss to Grimsby Town on 9 January 1999. Wilnis featured frequently during the remainder of the 1998–99 season as Ipswich finished 3rd in the First Division, losing out to Bolton Wanderers on aggregate over two legs in the First Division play-offs. He scored his first goal for the club on 3 April 1999, netting the final goal in a 6–0 win over Swindon Town.

He featured regularly during the 1999–2000 season as Ipswich challenged for promotion to the Premier League. He made his first appearance of the season on the opening day, featuring as a second-half substitute in a 3–1 home win over Nottingham Forest at Portman Road. He made 40 appearances in all competitions over the course of the season as Ipswich once again finished 3rd in the First Division, qualifying for the play-offs as a result. Ipswich faced Bolton Wanderers in the play-offs for the second consecutive season. Wilnis started the first leg of the play-off semi-finals away at the University of Bolton Stadium, with the match ending in a 2–2 draw after Ipswich came back from 0–2 down following a brace from Marcus Stewart. He did not feature in the semi-final second leg which Ipswich won 5–3, making the aggregate score 7–5 to earn Ipswich a place in the play-off final at Wembley Stadium. Wilnis featured as a late substitute during the final, replacing Jermaine Wright in the 89 minute. Ipswich won the final 4–2, earning promotion to the Premier League for the 2000–01 season.

Wilnis scored a rare and memorable goal against Manchester United in the first home game after Ipswich's return to the top flight on 22 August 2000. He continued to be a key part of the Ipswich first-team throughout the season. On 20 November, he scored the winning goal as Ipswich won 1–0 away against Coventry City at Highfield Road. Ipswich defied expectations to finish 5th in the Premier League, earning a place in the UEFA Cup for the following season. Wilnis made 37 appearances during the season, scoring twice.

After Chris Makin's recruitment in 2001, Wilnis played fewer games and looked to be on his way out of the club after falling out with manager George Burley after being substituted in the first half of the UEFA Cup tie at Helsingborg late in 2001. He saw his game time reduced during the 2001–02 season, making 19 appearances in all competitions as Ipswich suffered relegation from the Premier League following an 18th-placed finish.

Former Norwich striker Joe Royle's arrival as manager a year later saw Wilnis get his chance once more. He was a regular during the season, mainly at right-back whilst also often playing at left-back and latterly at centre-half during the former England striker's tenure as manager. Wilnis scored the opening goal in a 2–0 win away at Norwich City on 2 March 2003. He played a key part in Ipswich's league campaign, whilst also featuring in the UEFA Cup. In total, made 43 appearances during the season, scoring 2 goals.

Wilnis became one of the longest-serving players at the club. He continued to keep his place as the starting right-back in the team, making 46 appearances in all competitions and helping Ipswich reach the play-offs in the 2003–04 season by finishing 5th in the First Division.

Wilnis made a publicised "angry rant" against Norwich City, following Norwich's 3–1 win in a 2004 East Anglia derby match.

[Wilnis] said Norwich weren't good enough to top the table, wouldn't survive in the Premier League and unless they signed 15 new players they'd be relegated by Christmas – much to the fury of City followers.

In Wilnis' 2009 autobiography, he wrote:

"I got letters saying I was a dead man and threatening to break my arms and legs if I ever set foot in Norwich. At the time, it was really frightening ... I upset and offended some of their fans and for that I really am sorry. I think the dust has settled now, though. I've only been back there for football ... and won't risk doing anything else, especially if I'm with my family."

He continued to serve as Ipswich's starting right-back during the 2004–05 season. He helped the team reach the Championship play-offs once again as Ipswich finished 3rd in the league, narrowly missing out on an automatic promotion place. Ipswich lost out to West Ham United in the play-off semi-finals for the second consecutive season.

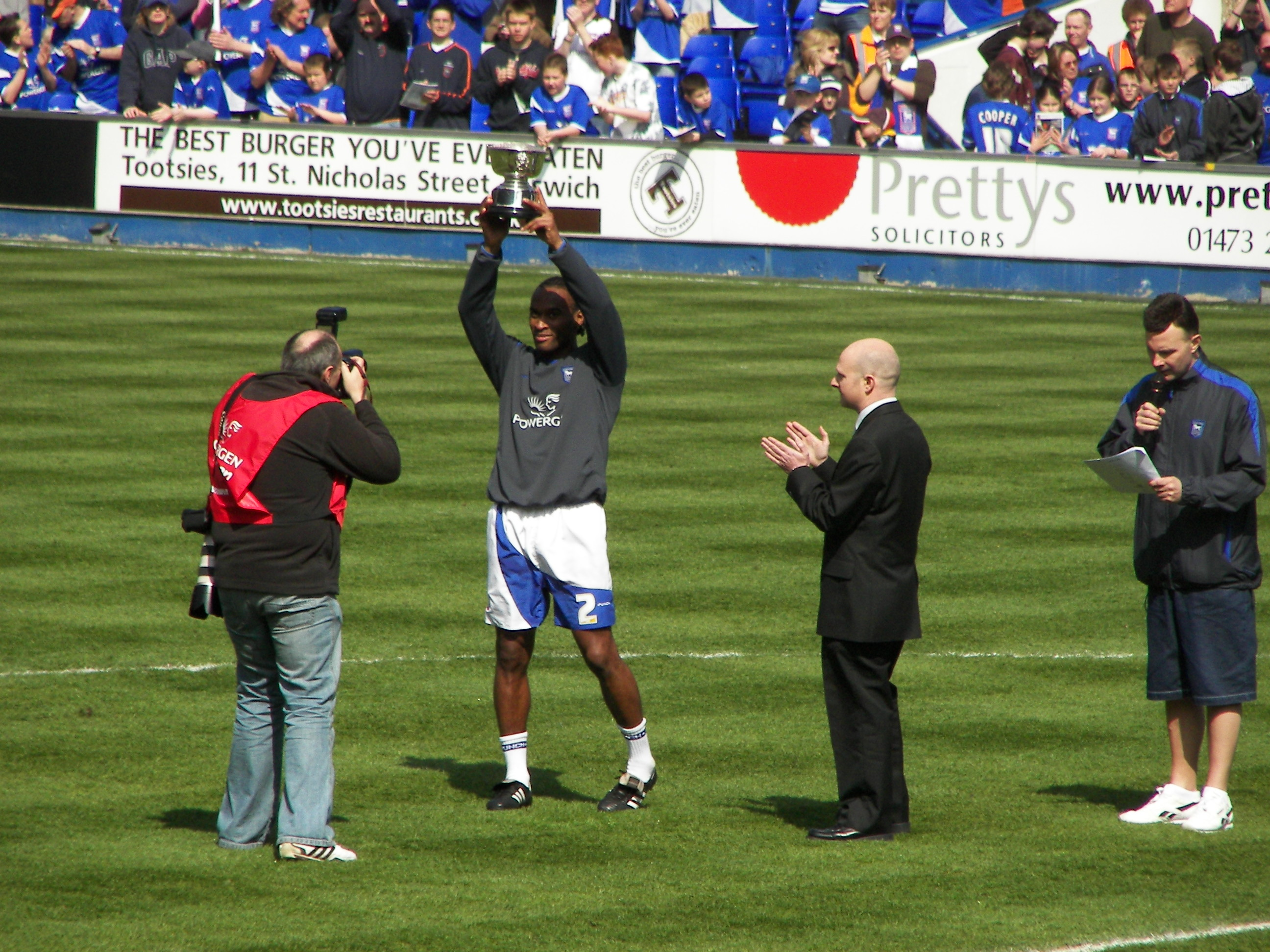
Wilnis with the Ipswich Town Player of the Year trophy, which he won for the 2005–06 season

The 2005–06 season was one of Wilnis' most impressive seasons at the club. He scored his first goal of the season on 2 January, in a 2–2 draw away at Stoke City at the Britannia Stadium. His performances during the season saw him win the supporters' Player of the Year award for the 2005–06.

Under Jim Magilton, Wilnis frequently found himself on the sidelines, but signed a new one-year contract in May 2007. The revival of form by Spanish defender Sito Castro and the strong partnership of Alex Bruce and Jason de Vos, made it hard for Wilnis to break back into the side. After Ipswich's final game of the 2007–08 season, Wilnis announced that he was to retire as a player, but was interested in coaching opportunities at Ipswich. Unfortunately he was told there were no vacancies at Portman Road at the time, which brought to an end a long association with the club. He was released by the club at the end of the 2007–08 season.

In August 2008, Wilnis signed for Grays Athletic on a one-year contract. He retired at the end of the 2008–09 season. Wilnis played his last game for Ipswich Town in his Testimonial game with Colchester United in 2009. A stunning own goal from Colchester defender Magnus Okuonghae and a strike from Jordan Rhodes gave the Blues a 2–0 victory. Fabian Wilnis made his final appearance in a Town shirt with 12 minutes left, his every touch applauded by the Blues supporters. After the final whistle Fabian Wilnis thanked and said goodbye to Town fans for the final time at the end of his distinguished 11 years in English football, 10 of them with the Blues. In December 2011 he joined the Colchester United Centre of Excellence coaching staff

== Career statistics ==
Appearances and goals by club, season and competition
Club	Season	League			National cup (Note: Includes appearances in FA Cup and KNVB Cup)		League cup (Note: Includes appearances in EFL Cup)		Other		Total	
Club	Season	Division	Apps	Goals	Apps	Goals	Apps	Goals	Apps	Goals	Apps	Goals
De Graafschap	1995–96	Eredivisie	32	0	1	0	—		—		33	0
De Graafschap	1996–97	Eredivisie	23	0	0	0	—		—		23	0
De Graafschap	1997–98	Eredivisie	33	1	0	0	—		—		33	1
De Graafschap	1998–99	Eredivisie	19	0	3	0	—		—		22	0
De Graafschap	Total		107	1	4	0	0	0	0	0	111	1
Ipswich Town	1998–99	First Division	18	1	1	0	0	0	2 (Note: Appearances in First Division play-offs)	0	21	1
Ipswich Town	1999–00	First Division	35	0	1	0	2	0	2	0	40	0
Ipswich Town	2000–01	Premier League	29	2	2	0	6	0	—		37	2
Ipswich Town	2001–02	Premier League	14	0	1	0	2	0	2 (Note: Appearances in UEFA Cup)	0	19	0
Ipswich Town	2002–03	First Division	35	2	2	0	2	0	4	0	43	2
Ipswich Town	2003–04	First Division	41	0	2	0	1	0	2	0	46	0
Ipswich Town	2004–05	Championship	41	0	1	0	0	0	2 (Note: Appearances in Championship play-offs)	0	44	0
Ipswich Town	2005–06	Championship	35	1	1	0	1	0	—		37	1
Ipswich Town	2006–07	Championship	21	0	2	0	1	0	—		24	0
Ipswich Town	2007–08	Championship	13	0	1	0	0	0	—		14	0
Ipswich Town	Total		282	6	14	0	15	0	12	0	323	6
Grays Athletic	2008–09	Conference Premier	33	0	2	0	—		0	0	35	0
Career total			422	7	20	0	15	0	12	0	469	7

== Honours ==
Ipswich Town

- Football League First Division play-offs: 2000

Individual

- Ipswich Town Player of the Year: 2005–06
