= 2003–04 Ipswich Town F.C. season =

Ipswich Town
2003–04 season
- Chairman: David Sheepshanks
- Manager: Joe Royle
- Stadium: Portman Road
- First Division: 5th
- FA Cup: Fourth round
- League Cup: Second round
- Play-offs: Semi-finals
- Top goalscorer: League: Darren Bent (15); All: Darren Bent (16)
- Highest home attendance: 30,152 (vs Norwich City, 21 Dec 2003, First Division)
- Lowest home attendance: 11,118 (vs Kidderminster Harriers, 13 Aug 2003, League Cup)
- Average home league attendance: 24,519
Home colours	Away colours

During the 2003–04 English football season, Ipswich Town competed in the Football League First Division.

== Season summary ==
Ipswich Town, in their second consecutive season in English football's second tier, finished the campaign in fifth place. Having scored 84 goals, Town suffered from their poor defensive record: with 72 goals conceded, Town had the third worst defensive record in the whole division, and the worst of the top 18 teams. Town won the first leg of their play-off, against fourth-placed West Ham United, with a goal from teenage striker Darren Bent (who scored 15 goals in the league alone), but lost the second leg 2–0, condemning Town to another season in the new championship.

== First-team squad ==
Squad at end of season

Note: Flags indicate national team as defined under FIFA eligibility rules; some limited exceptions apply. Players may hold more than one non-FIFA nationality.

No.	Pos.	Nation	Player
1	GK	ENG	Kelvin Davis
2	DF	NED	Fabian Wilnis
3	DF	ENG	Chris Makin
4	DF	ENG	John McGreal
5	DF	GUI	Drissa Diallo
6	DF	SCO	Matt Elliott (on loan from Leicester City)
7	MF	NIR	Jim Magilton (captain)
8	MF	ENG	Tommy Miller
9	FW	ESP	Pablo Couñago
10	FW	ENG	Alun Armstrong
11	MF	ENG	Jermaine Wright

No.	Pos.	Nation	Player
12	DF	ENG	Richard Naylor
14	DF	ENG	Matt Richards
15	DF	CPV	Georges Santos
17	FW	ENG	Dean Bowditch
18	FW	ENG	Darren Bent
23	MF	ENG	Chris Bart-Williams
30	MF	NED	Martijn Reuser
32	FW	FIN	Shefki Kuqi
33	MF	ENG	Ian Westlake
34	GK	WAL	Lewis Price

=== Left club during season ===
Note: Flags indicate national team as defined under FIFA eligibility rules; some limited exceptions apply. Players may hold more than one non-FIFA nationality.

No.	Pos.	Nation	Player
16	FW	ENG	Marcus Bent (on loan to Leicester City)
19	GK	ENG	Andy Marshall (on loan to Wolverhampton Wanderers and Millwall)
22	GK	ENG	Nathan Abbey (to Burnley)

No.	Pos.	Nation	Player
25	MF	IRL	Alan Mahon (on loan from Blackburn Rovers)
26	GK	ENG	James Pullen (to Peterborough United)
27	MF	ENG	Matt Bloomfield (to Wycombe Wanderers)

=== Reserve squad ===
Note: Flags indicate national team as defined under FIFA eligibility rules; some limited exceptions apply. Players may hold more than one non-FIFA nationality.

No.	Pos.	Nation	Player
20	DF	ENG	Aidan Collins
21	DF	ENG	Scott Mitchell
24	MF	NED	Nabil Abidallah
26	DF	ENG	Scott Barron

No.	Pos.	Nation	Player
28	DF	IRL	Gerard Nash
29	FW	ENG	Antonio Murray
31	FW	NIR	Sam Morrow

== Pre-season ==
Ipswich's pre-season preparations for the 2003–04 season included a pre-season tour of Scandinavia in July.

=== Legend ===
Win	Draw	Loss

Date	Opponent	Venue	Result	Attendance	Scorers
15 July 2003	Southend United	A	4–2	Unknown	Westlake, M Bent, D Bent, Couñago
18 July 2003	Mjällby	A	3–1	Unknown	M Bent, D Bent, Couñago
20 July 2003	Helsingør IF	A	3–1	Unknown	D Bent (2), M Bent
22 July 2003	Trelleborgs FF	A	5–0	Unknown	D Bent (pen), Couñago, Reuser, M Bent, Wilnis
26 July 2003	Colchester United	A	3–0	Unknown	M Bent, D Bent (2)
30 July 2003	Boston United	A	2–0	Unknown	Westlake, Armstrong
1 August 2003	Levski Sofia	H	1–1	Unknown	Couñago

== Competitions ==
=== Football League First Division ===
==== League table ====
Pos	Team	Pld	W	D	L	GF	GA	GD	Pts	Promotion, qualification or relegation
3	Sunderland	46	22	13	11	62	45	+17	79	Qualification for the First Division play-offs
4	West Ham United	46	19	17	10	67	45	+22	74	Qualification for the First Division play-offs
5	Ipswich Town	46	21	10	15	84	72	+12	73	Qualification for the First Division play-offs
6	Crystal Palace (O, P)	46	21	10	15	72	61	+11	73	Qualification for the First Division play-offs
7	Wigan Athletic	46	18	17	11	60	45	+15	71	

Source: Soccerway
Rules for classification: 1) points; 2) goal difference; 3) number of goals scored.
(O) Play-off winners; (P) Promoted

==== Legend ====
Win	Draw	Loss

Ipswich Town's score comes first

==== Matches ====
Date	Opponent	Venue	Result	Attendance	Scorers
9 August 2003	Reading	H	1–1	24,830	Miller (pen)
16 August 2003	Crewe Alexandra	A	0–1	6,982	
23 August 2003	Coventry City	H	1–1	22,419	M Bent
26 August 2003	Wigan Athletic	A	0–1	8,292	
30 August 2003	West Ham United	H	1–2	29,679	Wright
13 September 2003	West Bromwich Albion	A	1–4	24,954	Naylor
16 September 2003	Walsall	H	2–1	20,912	Armstrong (pen), D Bent
20 September 2003	Wimbledon	H	4–1	23,428	Armstrong, Naylor, D Bent, Couñago (pen)
27 September 2003	Watford	A	2–1	15,350	Kuqi, Magilton
30 September 2003	Sunderland	A	2–3	24,840	D Bent, Naylor
4 October 2003	Rotherham United	H	2–1	21,859	Couñago (2) (pen)
11 October 2003	Bradford City	A	1–0	10,229	Mahon
14 October 2003	Burnley	H	6–1	22,048	Couñago (2), Wright, Chris Bart-Williams, Chaplow (o.g.), Kuqi
18 October 2003	Stoke City	H	1–0	22,122	Richards
21 October 2003	Crystal Palace	A	4–3	15,483	Naylor (2), Couñago, Kuqi
25 October 2003	Preston North End	A	1–1	14,863	Couñago (pen)
1 November 2003	Gillingham	H	3–4	24,788	Westlake, Couñago, Miller
8 November 2003	Derby County	A	2–2	19,976	Miller (pen), D Bent
22 November 2003	Sheffield United	H	3–0	25,004	Kuqi (pen), Westlake, D Bent
29 November 2003	Cardiff City	A	3–2	17,833	Miller, Santos, Bart-Williams
3 December 2003	Nottingham Forest	A	1–1	21,558	D Bent
6 December 2003	Derby County	H	2–1	25,018	D Bent, Mawene (o.g.)
13 December 2003	Millwall	A	0–0	9,829	
21 December 2003	Norwich City	H	0–2	30,152	
26 December 2003	West Ham United	A	2–1	35,021	Couñago (2) (pen)
28 December 2003	Crystal Palace	H	1–3	27,629	Wright
10 January 2004	Reading	A	1–1	17,362	McGreal
17 January 2004	Crewe Alexandra	H	6–4	22,071	Miller (2), Kuqi (2), Reuser, Couñago
31 January 2004	Coventry City	A	1–1	14,441	Westlake
7 February 2004	Wigan Athletic	H	1–3	22,093	Kuqi
14 February 2004	Bradford City	H	3–1	21,478	Kuqi, Westlake, D Bent
21 February 2004	Burnley	A	2–4	12,418	Miller, Reuser
28 February 2004	Preston North End	H	2–0	23,359	Miller, Westlake
2 March 2004	Stoke City	A	0–2	11,435	
7 March 2004	Norwich City	A	1–3	23,942	Miller
13 March 2004	Millwall	H	1–3	23,582	D Bent
16 March 2004	Walsall	A	3–1	6,562	D Bent (3)
20 March 2004	Watford	H	4–1	23,524	Bowditch (3), Wright
27 March 2004	Wimbledon	A	2–1	6,389	D Bent, Kuqi
4 April 2004	West Bromwich Albion	H	2–3	24,608	Miller, D Bent
10 April 2004	Rotherham United	A	3–1	6,561	Wright, D Bent, Kuqi
12 April 2004	Sunderland	H	1–0	26,801	Miller (pen)
17 April 2004	Gillingham	A	2–1	9,641	Reuser, D Bent
24 April 2004	Nottingham Forest	H	1–2	27,848	Bowditch
30 April 2004	Sheffield United	A	1–1	24,184	Westlake
9 May 2004	Cardiff City	H	1–1	28,703	Kuqi

=== First Division play-offs ===
Round	Date	Opponent	Venue	Result	Attendance	Goalscorers
SF 1st Leg	15 May 2004	West Ham United	H	1–0	28,435	D Bent
SF 2nd Leg	18 May 2004	West Ham United	A	0–2	34,002	

=== FA Cup ===
Round	Date	Opponent	Venue	Result	Attendance	Goalscorers
R3	4 January 2004	Derby County	H	3–0	16,159	Naylor, Miller, Kuqi
R4	24 January 2004	Sunderland	H	1–2	21,406	Reuser

=== League Cup ===
Round	Date	Opponent	Venue	Result	Attendance	Goalscorers
R3	13 August 2003	Kidderminster Harriers	H	1–0	11,118	Bowditch
R4	23 September 2003	Notts County	A	1–2	4,059	Couñago

== Transfers ==
=== Transfers in ===
Date	Pos	Name	From	Fee	Ref
4 June 2003	DF	(Guinea) Drissa Diallo	(England) Burnley	Free transfer	
17 July 2003	DF	(Cape Verde) Georges Santos	(England) Grimsby Town	Free transfer	
28 July 2003	GK	(England) Kelvin Davis	(England) Wimbledon	Free transfer	
27 November 2003	FW	(Finland) Shefki Kuqi	(England) Sheffield Wednesday	Free transfer	
11 December 2003	MF	(England) Chris Bart-Williams	(England) Charlton Athletic	Undisclosed	
17 December 2003	GK	(England) Nathan Abbey	(England) Hayes	Free transfer	

=== Loans in ===
Date from	Pos	Name	From	Date until	Ref
5 September 2003	DF	(Republic of Ireland) Alan Mahon	(England) Blackburn Rovers	22 December 2003	
10 September 2003	MF	(England) Chris Bart-Williams	(England) Charlton Athletic	11 December 2003	
26 September 2003	FW	(Finland) Shefki Kuqi	(England) Sheffield Wednesday	27 November 2003	
14 March 2004	DF	(Scotland) Matt Elliott	(England) Leicester City	30 June 2004	

=== Transfers out ===
Date	Pos	Name	To	Fee	Ref
9 June 2003	DF	(England) Lee Beevers	(England) Boston United	Free transfer	
12 June 2003	MF	(Nigeria) Finidi George	Free agent	Mutual Consent	
16 June 2003	MF	(Republic of Ireland) Matt Holland	(England) Charlton Athletic	£750,000	
19 June 2003	MF	(France) Ulrich Le Pen	(France) Strasbourg	Free transfer	
1 July 2003	MF	(England) Matthew Robinson	Free agent	Released	
10 July 2003	DF	(England) Mark Venus	(England) Cambridge United	Free transfer	
18 July 2003	GK	(Italy) Matteo Sereni	(Italy) Lazio	Undisclosed	
31 July 2003	DF	(Denmark) Thomas Gaardsøe	(England) West Bromwich Albion	Undisclosed	
2 September 2003	DF	(Turkey) Erdem Artun	(England) Darlington	Free transfer	
3 November 2003	GK	(England) James Pullen	(England) Peterborough United	Free transfer	
23 December 2003	MF	(England) Matt Bloomfield	(England) Wycombe Wanderers	Free transfer	
16 January 2004	GK	(England) Nathan Abbey	(England) Burnley	Free transfer	
25 March 2004	GK	(England) Andy Marshall	(England) Millwall	Free transfer	

=== Loans out ===
Date from	Pos	Name	From	Date until	Ref
4 August 2003	GK	(England) James Pullen	(England) Dagenham & Redbridge	19 October 2003	
1 September 2003	FW	(England) Marcus Bent	(England) Leicester City	30 June 2004	
11 November 2003	GK	(England) Andy Marshall	(England) Wolverhampton Wanderers	1 January 2004	
10 December 2003	FW	(England) Sam Morrow	(England) Boston United	11 January 2004	
10 December 2003	DF	(England) Chris Hogg	(England) Boston United	14 March 2004	
22 December 2003	FW	(England) Alun Armstrong	(England) Bradford City	18 March 2004	
17 January 2004	MF	(Netherlands) Nabil Abidallah	(England) Northampton Town	17 February 2004	
28 January 2004	GK	(England) Andy Marshall	(England) Millwall	24 March 2004	

== Squad statistics ==
All statistics updated as of end of season

=== Appearances and goals ===
No.	Pos	Nat	Player	Total		First Division		FA Cup		League Cup		Play-offs	
No.	Pos	Nat	Player	Apps	Goals	Apps	Goals	Apps	Goals	Apps	Goals	Apps	Goals
Goalkeepers
1	GK	(England) ENG	Kelvin Davis	51	0	45	0	2	0	2	0	2	0
34	GK	(Wales) WAL	Lewis Price	1	0	1	0	0	0	0	0	0	0
Defenders
2	DF	(Netherlands) NED	Fabian Wilnis	46	0	41	0	2	0	1	0	2	0
3	DF	(England) ENG	Chris Makin	6	0	5	0	0	0	1	0	0	0
4	DF	(England) ENG	John McGreal	21	1	18	1	2	0	0	0	1	0
5	DF	(Guinea) GUI	Drissa Diallo	20	0	16+3	0	0	0	1	0	0	0
6	DF	(Scotland) SCO	Matt Elliott	12	0	10	0	0	0	0	0	2	0
12	DF	(England) ENG	Richard Naylor	45	6	28+11	5	2	1	1+1	0	2	0
14	DF	(England) ENG	Matt Richards	50	1	41+3	1	2	0	2	0	2	0
15	DF	(Cape Verde) CPV	Georges Santos	36	1	28+6	1	0	0	2	0	0	0
21	DF	(England) ENG	Scott Mitchell	2	0	0+2	0	0	0	0	0	0	0
28	DF	(Republic of Ireland) IRL	Gerard Nash	1	0	0+1	0	0	0	0	0	0	0
Midfielders
7	MF	(Northern Ireland) NIR	Jim Magilton	52	1	46	1	1+1	0	2	0	2	0
8	MF	(England) ENG	Tommy Miller	39	12	27+7	11	2	1	1	0	2	0
11	DF	(England) ENG	Jermaine Wright	51	5	42+3	5	2	0	2	0	2	0
23	MF	(England) ENG	Chris Bart-Williams	28	2	23+3	2	1	0	0	0	0+1	0
30	MF	(Netherlands) NED	Martijn Reuser	21	4	3+14	3	1+1	1	1	0	0+1	0
33	MF	(England) ENG	Ian Westlake	43	6	30+9	6	1	0	1	0	2	0
Forwards
9	FW	(Spain) ESP	Pablo Couñago	33	12	18+11	11	2	0	2	1	0	0
10	FW	(England) ENG	Alun Armstrong	9	2	5+2	2	0	0	0+1	0	0+1	0
17	FW	(England) ENG	Dean Bowditch	20	5	7+9	4	0+1	0	1+1	1	0+1	0
18	FW	(England) ENG	Darren Bent	41	17	32+5	16	1	0	1	0	2	1
22	FW	(England) ENG	Darryl Knights	0	0	0	0	0	0	0	0	0	0
31	FW	(Northern Ireland) NIR	Sam Morrow	1	0	0	0	0	0	0+1	0	0	0
32	FW	(Finland) FIN	Shefki Kuqi	40	12	29+7	11	1+1	1	0	0	1+1	0
Players transferred out during the season
16	FW	(England) ENG	Marcus Bent	5	1	4	1	0	0	0+1	0	0	0
23	MF	(Republic of Ireland) IRL	Alan Mahon	12	1	7+4	1	0	0	1	0	0	0
27	MF	(England) ENG	Matt Bloomfield	1	0	0	0	0	0	0+1	0	0	0

Last updated: end of season
Source: Competitions

=== Goalscorers ===
No.	Pos	Nat	Player	First Division	FA Cup	League Cup	Play-offs	Total
18	FW	(England)	Darren Bent	15	0	0	1	16
8	MF	(England)	Tommy Miller	11	1	0	0	12
9	FW	(Spain)	Pablo Couñago	11	0	1	0	12
32	FW	(Finland)	Shefki Kuqi	11	1	0	0	12
12	DF	(England)	Richard Naylor	5	1	0	0	6
33	MF	(England)	Ian Westlake	6	0	0	0	6
11	MF	(England)	Jermaine Wright	5	0	0	0	5
17	FW	(England)	Dean Bowditch	4	0	1	0	5
30	MF	(Netherlands)	Martijn Reuser	3	1	0	0	4
10	FW	(England)	Alun Armstrong	2	0	0	0	2
23	MF	(England)	Chris Bart-Williams	2	0	0	0	2
4	DF	(England)	John McGreal	1	0	0	0	1
7	MF	(Northern Ireland)	Jim Magilton	1	0	0	0	1
14	DF	(England)	Matt Richards	1	0	0	0	1
15	DF	(Cape Verde)	Georges Santos	1	0	0	0	1
16	FW	(England)	Marcus Bent	1	0	0	0	1
25	MF	(Republic of Ireland)	Alan Mahon	1	0	0	0	1
Own goal				1	0	0	0	1
Total				82	4	2	1	89

=== Clean sheets ===
No.	Nat	Player	First Division	FA Cup	League Cup	Play-offs	Total
1	(England)	Kelvin Davis	6	1	1	1	9
Total			6	1	1	1	9

=== Disciplinary record ===
No.	Pos.	Name	First Division		FA Cup		League Cup		Play-offs		Total	
No.	Pos.	Name	Yellow card	Red card	Yellow card	Red card	Yellow card	Red card	Yellow card	Red card	Yellow card	Red card
1	GK	(England) Kelvin Davis	1	0	0	0	0	0	0	0	1	0
2	DF	(Netherlands) Fabian Wilnis	7	0	1	0	0	0	2	0	10	0
3	DF	(England) Chris Makin	2	0	0	0	0	0	0	0	2	0
4	DF	(England) John McGreal	2	0	0	0	0	0	0	0	2	0
5	DF	(Guinea) Drissa Diallo	4	1	0	0	0	0	0	0	4	1
6	DF	(Scotland) Matt Elliott	2	0	0	0	0	0	0	0	2	0
7	MF	(Northern Ireland) Jim Magilton	5	0	0	0	0	0	1	0	6	0
8	MF	(England) Tommy Miller	2	0	0	0	0	0	0	0	2	0
9	FW	(Spain) Pablo Couñago	4	0	0	0	0	0	0	0	4	0
11	MF	(England) Jermaine Wright	2	0	0	0	0	0	0	0	2	0
12	DF	(England) Richard Naylor	8	0	0	0	0	0	0	0	8	0
14	DF	(England) Matt Richards	5	0	0	0	0	0	0	0	5	0
15	DF	(Cape Verde) Georges Santos	8	0	0	0	0	0	0	0	8	0
17	FW	(England) Dean Bowditch	1	0	0	0	0	0	0	0	1	0
18	FW	(England) Darren Bent	1	0	0	0	0	0	0	0	1	0
23	MF	(England) Chris Bart-Williams	9	0	0	0	0	0	0	0	9	0
25	MF	(Republic of Ireland) Alan Mahon	4	0	0	0	0	0	0	0	4	0
30	MF	(Netherlands) Martijn Reuser	1	0	0	0	0	0	0	0	1	0
32	FW	(Finland) Shefki Kuqi	5	0	0	0	0	0	0	0	5	0
33	MF	(England) Ian Westlake	3	0	0	0	0	0	0	0	3	0
Total			76	1	1	0	0	0	3	0	80	1

=== Starting 11 ===
Considering starts in all competitions

No.	Pos.	Nat.	Name	MS	Notes
1	GK	(England)	Kelvin Davis	51	
2	RB	(Netherlands)	Fabian Wilnis	46	
15	CB	(Cape Verde)	Georges Santos	30	
6	CB	(England)	Richard Naylor	50	
3	LB	(England)	Matt Richards	47	
11	RM	(England)	Jermaine Wright	48	
8	CM	(England)	Tommy Miller	32	Chris Bart-Williams has 24 starts
7	CM	(Northern Ireland)	Jim Magilton	51	
33	LM	(England)	Ian Westlake	34	
18	CF	(England)	Darren Bent	36	
32	CF	(Finland)	Shefki Kuqi	31	

4–4–2 Formation

== Awards ==
=== Player awards ===
Award	Player	Ref
Player of the Year	(England) Ian Westlake	
Players' Player of the Year	(England) Jermaine Wright	
Young Player of the Year	(England) Dean Bowditch	
