= 2002–03 Ipswich Town F.C. season =

Ipswich Town
2002-03 season
- Chairman: David Sheepshanks
- Manager: George Burley (until 11 October 2002); Tony Mowbray (caretaker) (11–28 October 2002); Joe Royle (from 28 October 2002)
- Stadium: Portman Road
- First Division: 7th
- FA Cup: Fourth round
- League Cup: Fourth round
- UEFA Cup: Second round
- Top goalscorer: League: Pablo Couñago (17); All: Pablo Couñago (21)
- Highest home attendance: 29,503 (vs Nottingham Forest, 5 Apr 2003, First Division)
- Lowest home attendance: 13,266 (vs Brighton & Hove Albion, 24 Sep 2002, League Cup)
- Average home league attendance: 25,498
Home colours	Away colours

During the 2002–03 English football season, Ipswich Town competed in the First Division, following relegation from the FA Premier League the previous season. Despite being relegated, Ipswich Town had achieved UEFA Cup qualification for the second season running, this time via the UEFA Respect Fair Play ranking.

== Season summary ==
The financial cost of relegation the previous season saw Ipswich enter administration on 10 February. The financial problems had caused the sale of both key players like Marcus Stewart and promising young players like Titus Bramble and Darren Ambrose, leading to poor results on the pitch that left Ipswich struggling near the relegation zone. A 3–0 defeat at fellow strugglers Grimsby Town proved to be the final straw and manager George Burley was sacked in October. First team coach and former Ipswich player Tony Mowbray took charge of the next four games, winning one, before being replaced by Joe Royle - a former player for Town's archrivals Norwich City. Royle turned Town's fortunes around considerably and they finished in 7th place, 4 points off the playoff places.

In the League Cup, Ipswich reached the fourth round before being knocked out by eventual winners Liverpool 5–4 on penalties, after Tommy Miller's strike in the fourteenth minute was cancelled out by El Hadji Diouf's 54th-minute penalty.

== First-team squad ==
Squad at end of season

Note: Flags indicate national team as defined under FIFA eligibility rules; some limited exceptions apply. Players may hold more than one non-FIFA nationality.

No.	Pos.	Nation	Player
1	GK	ENG	Andy Marshall
2	DF	NED	Fabian Wilnis
4	DF	ENG	John McGreal
6	DF	ENG	Mark Venus
7	MF	NIR	Jim Magilton
8	MF	IRL	Matt Holland (captain)
9	FW	ESP	Pablo Couñago
10	FW	ENG	Alun Armstrong
12	DF	ENG	Richard Naylor
14	MF	ENG	Jermaine Wright

No.	Pos.	Nation	Player
15	DF	ENG	Chris Makin
16	FW	ENG	Marcus Bent
17	FW	ENG	Dean Bowditch
18	FW	ENG	Darren Bent
19	MF	NGA	Finidi George
21	MF	ENG	Tommy Miller
23	DF	DEN	Thomas Gaardsøe
26	GK	ENG	James Pullen
30	MF	NED	Martijn Reuser
32	DF	ENG	Matt Richards

=== Left club during season ===
Note: Flags indicate national team as defined under FIFA eligibility rules; some limited exceptions apply. Players may hold more than one non-FIFA nationality.

No.	Pos.	Nation	Player
3	MF	ENG	Jamie Clapham (to Birmingham City)
5	DF	ISL	Hermann Hreiðarsson (to Charlton Athletic)
11	FW	ENG	Marcus Stewart (to Sunderland)
13	GK	IRL	Keith Branagan (retired)
17	DF	ENG	Wayne Brown (to Watford)

No.	Pos.	Nation	Player
20	FW	ENG	Richard Logan (to Boston United)
22	MF	ENG	Darren Ambrose (to Newcastle United)
25	MF	FRA	Ulrich Le Pen (on loan to Strasbourg)
29	DF	RSA	Justin Miller (to Leyton Orient)
31	GK	ENG	Paul Gerrard (on loan from Everton)

=== Reserve squad ===
Note: Flags indicate national team as defined under FIFA eligibility rules; some limited exceptions apply. Players may hold more than one non-FIFA nationality.

No.	Pos.	Nation	Player
20	DF	ENG	Aidan Collins
24	MF	NED	Nabil Abidallah
27	MF	ENG	Matt Bloomfield
28	DF	ENG	Lee Beevers

No.	Pos.	Nation	Player
29	FW	ENG	Antonio Murray
33	MF	ENG	Ian Westlake
35	GK	WAL	Lewis Price

== Pre-season ==
Ipswich went on a pre-season tour of Denmark in July as part of the pre-season for the 2002–03 season.

=== Legend ===
Win	Draw	Loss

Date	Opponent	Venue	Result	Attendance	Scorers
16 July 2002	AaB	A	0–1	Unknown	
18 July 2002	Nordsjælland	A	1–2	Unknown	Armstrong
24 July 2002	Bristol Rovers	A	2–1	Unknown	Ambrose, D Bent
27 July 2002	Bristol City	A	3–0	Unknown	D Bent, Miller (2) (pen)
29 July 2002	Barnet	A	2–1	Unknown	Couñago (2)
31 July 2002	Brentford	A	3–0	Unknown	George, Stewart (2)
3 August 2002	Celta Vigo	H	2–1	Unknown	Ambrose (2)

== Competitions ==
=== Football League First Division ===
==== League table ====
Pos	Team	Pld	W	D	L	GF	GA	GD	Pts	Promotion or relegation
5	Wolverhampton Wanderers (O, P)	46	20	16	10	81	44	+37	76	Qualification for First Division Playoffs
6	Nottingham Forest	46	20	14	12	82	50	+32	74	Qualification for First Division Playoffs
7	Ipswich Town	46	19	13	14	80	64	+16	70	
8	Norwich City	46	19	12	15	60	49	+11	69	
9	Millwall	46	19	9	18	59	69	−10	66	

Updated to match(es) played on 11 May 2003. Source: Soccerway
Rules for classification: 1) points; 2) goal difference; 3) number of goals scored.
(O) Play-off winners; (P) Promoted

==== Legend ====
Win	Draw	Loss

Ipswich Town's score comes first

==== Matches ====
Date	Opponent	Venue	Result	Attendance	Scorers
10 August 2002	Walsall	A	2–0	5,253	Ambrose, M Bent
18 August 2002	Leicester City	H	6–1	27,374	Holland (2), Ambrose, George, Couñago (2)
24 August 2002	Millwall	A	1–1	8,097	D Bent
26 August 2002	Bradford City	H	1–2	25,457	D Bent
1 September 2002	Preston North End	A	0–0	15,357	
15 September 2002	Norwich City	H	1–1	29,112	Couñago
22 September 2002	Stoke City	A	1–2	14,587	Holland
28 September 2002	Derby County	H	0–1	24,439	
6 October 2002	Wimbledon	A	1–0	3,238	Ambrose
8 October 2002	Grimsby Town	A	0–3	4,688	
12 October 2002	Sheffield Wednesday	H	2–1	23,410	Couñago (2)
19 October 2002	Reading	A	1–3	19,524	Ambrose
22 October 2002	Burnley	H	2–2	22,736	McGreal, Ambrose
26 October 2002	Gillingham	H	0–1	24,176	
3 November 2002	Crystal Palace	H	1–2	24,941	Ambrose
9 November 2002	Sheffield United	A	0–0	15,884	
17 November 2002	Watford	A	2–0	16,184	Armstrong, Clapham
23 November 2002	Coventry City	H	2–1	23,633	D Bent, Couñago
30 November 2002	Nottingham Forest	A	1–2	24,898	Williams (o.g)
7 December 2002	Rotherham United	H	1–2	22,770	Wilnis
10 December 2002	Brighton & Hove Albion	A	1–1	6,377	Magilton
14 December 2002	Watford	H	4–2	22,985	Miller, Naylor, Couñago, Bent
21 December 2002	Portsmouth	A	1–1	19,130	Gaardsøe
26 December 2002	Leicester City	A	2–1	31,426	Gaardsøe, Ambrose
28 December 2002	Walsall	H	3–2	26,550	Couñago (2), Gaardsøe
1 January 2003	Millwall	H	4–1	26,040	Miller (2), Wright, M Bent
11 January 2003	Burnley	A	1–1	15,501	Couñago
18 January 2003	Preston North End	H	3–0	24,666	M Bent, D Bent (2)
1 February 2003	Bradford City	A	0–2	12,080	
8 February 2003	Sheffield United	H	3–2	26,151	D Bent (2), Ambrose
19 February 2003	Wolverhampton Wanderers	H	2–4	27,700	M Bent, Holland
22 February 2003	Grimsby Town	H	2–2	24,118	D Bent
2 March 2003	Norwich City	A	2–0	21,243	Wilnis, D Bent
5 March 2003	Wolverhampton Wanderers	A	1–1	26,901	Naylor
8 March 2003	Stoke City	H	0–0	25,547	
11 March 2003	Crystal Palace	A	1–1	15,990	M Bent
15 March 2003	Sheffield Wednesday	A	1–0	24,726	Holland
18 March 2003	Reading	H	3–1	24,108	Gaardsøe, Holland, Magilton
22 March 2003	Brighton & Hove Albion	H	2–2	26,078	M Bent, Reuser
29 March 2003	Gillingham	A	3–1	8,508	Couñago (2), M Bent
5 April 2003	Nottingham Forest	H	3–4	29,503	Miller (2) (pen), M Bent
12 April 2003	Coventry City	A	4–2	13,968	M Bent (2), Couñago (2)
18 April 2003	Portsmouth	H	3–0	29,396	Reuser, Miller, Couñago
21 April 2003	Rotherham United	A	1–2	7,519	Couñago
26 April 2003	Wimbledon	H	1–5	25,564	D Bent
4 May 2003	Derby County	A	4–1	28,785	Couñago, D Bent, Magilton, Holland

=== FA Cup ===
Round	Date	Opponent	Venue	Result	Attendance	Goalscorers
R3	4 January 2003	Morecambe	H	4–0	18,529	Clapham, D Bent (2), Ambrose
R4	25 January 2003	Sheffield United	A	3–4	12,757	Gaardsøe, Miller (pen), Bent

=== League Cup ===
Round	Date	Opponent	Venue	Result	Attendance	Goalscorers
R3	24 September 2002	Brighton & Hove Albion	H	3–1	13,266	D Bent, Couñago, Ambrose
R4	6 November 2002	Middlesbrough	H	3–1	14,417	Gaardsøe, Clapham, D Bent
R5	4 December 2002	Liverpool	A	1–1 (lost 4–5 on pens)	26,305	Miller

=== UEFA Cup ===
Round	Date	Opponent	Venue	Result	Attendance	Goalscorers
QR First Leg	15 August 2002	Avenir Beggen	A	1–1	12,000	Stewart
QR Second Leg	29 August 2002	Avenir Beggen	H	8–1 (won 9–2 on agg)	17,462	Miller (2), Couñago (3), Brown, McGreal, Ambrose
R1 First Leg	19 September 2002	Smederevo	H	1–1	16,933	Alun Armstrong
R1 Second Leg	3 October 2002	Smederevo	A	1–0 (won 2–1 on agg)	16,500	M Bent (pen)
R2 First Leg	31 October 2002	Slovan Liberec	H	1–0	16,138	D Bent
R2 Second Leg	14 November 2002	Slovan Liberec	A	0–1 (1–1 on agg, lost 2–4 on pens)	6,509	

== Transfers ==
=== Loans in ===
Date from	Pos	Name	From	Date until	Ref
15 November 2002	GK	(England) Paul Gerrard	(England) Everton	13 December 2002	

=== Transfers out ===
Date	Pos	Name	To	Fee	Ref
1 July 2002	DF	(England) Will Snowdon	(Scotland) Livingston	Free transfer	
1 July 2002	MF	(England) Ashley Nicholls	(England) Darlington	Free transfer	
12 July 2002	DF	(England) Titus Bramble	(England) Newcastle United	£5,000,000	
30 August 2002	FW	(England) Marcus Stewart	(England) Sunderland	£3,250,000	
30 October 2002	GK	(Republic of Ireland) Keith Branagan	Retired		
18 December 2002	DF	(England) Wayne Brown	(England) Watford	Free transfer	
10 January 2003	DF	(England) Jamie Clapham	(England) Birmingham City	£1,300,000	
20 January 2003	FW	(England) Richard Logan	(England) Boston United	Free transfer	
31 January 2003	DF	(South Africa) Justin Miller	(England) Leyton Orient	Free transfer	
11 March 2003	FW	(England) Steve Burton	(England) Doncaster Rovers	Free transfer	
24 March 2003	MF	(England) Darren Ambrose	(England) Newcastle United	Undisclosed	
27 March 2003	DF	(Iceland) Hermann Hreiðarsson	(England) Charlton Athletic	£900,000	

=== Loans out ===
Date from	Pos	Name	From	Date until	Ref
18 July 2002	GK	(Italy) Matteo Sereni	(Italy) Brescia	30 June 2003	
6 August 2002	FW	(England) Steve Burton	(England) Boston united	6 October 2002	
29 August 2002	MF	(France) Ulrich Le Pen	(France) Strasbourg	1 June 2003	
13 September 2002	DF	(South Africa) Justin Miller	(England) Leyton Orient	17 December 2002	
16 September 2002	DF	(Turkey) Erdem Artun	(England) Doncaster Rovers	16 October 2002	
29 November 2002	FW	(England) Richard Logan	(England) Boston United	19 January 2003	
26 March 2003	DF	(England) Lee Beevers	(England) Boston United	4 May 2003	
26 March 2003	MF	(England) Robert Dickinson	(England) Boston United	4 May 2003	

== Squad statistics ==
All statistics updated as of end of season

=== Appearances and goals ===
No.	Pos	Nat	Player	Total		First Division		FA Cup		League Cup		UEFA Cup	
No.	Pos	Nat	Player	Apps	Goals	Apps	Goals	Apps	Goals	Apps	Goals	Apps	Goals
Goalkeepers
1	GK	(England) ENG	Andy Marshall	50	0	40	0	2	0	2	0	6	0
26	GK	(England) ENG	James Pullen	2	0	1	0	0	0	1	0	0	0
Defenders
2	DF	(Netherlands) NED	Fabian Wilnis	43	2	33+2	2	2	0	2	0	4	0
4	DF	(England) ENG	John McGreal	22	2	16	1	0	0	1	0	5	1
6	DF	(England) ENG	Mark Venus	12	0	8	0	0	0	2	0	2	0
12	DF	(England) ENG	Richard Naylor	19	2	11+6	2	1	0	0+1	0	0	0
15	DF	(England) ENG	Chris Makin	38	0	33	0	1	0	1	0	3	0
20	DF	(England) ENG	Aidan Collins	1	0	0+1	0	0	0	0	0	0	0
23	DF	(Denmark) DEN	Thomas Gaardsøe	42	7	37	4	1	1	2	1	2	1
32	DF	(England) ENG	Matt Richards	17	0	10+3	0	1	0	0+1	0	1+1	0
Midfielders
7	MF	(Northern Ireland) NIR	Jim Magilton	47	3	39+1	3	1	0	1+1	0	3+1	0
8	MF	(Republic of Ireland) IRL	Matt Holland	54	7	45	7	2	0	1	0	4+2	0
14	MF	(England) ENG	Jermaine Wright	47	1	25+14	1	2	0	3	0	3	0
19	MF	(Nigeria) NGA	Finidi George	17	1	3+7	1	0	0	1+1	0	1+4	0
21	MF	(England) ENG	Tommy Miller	37	10	24+6	6	1	1	2	1	3+1	2
24	MF	(Netherlands) NED	Nabil Abidallah	1	0	0	0	0+1	0	0	0	0	0
30	MF	(Netherlands) NED	Martijn Reuser	18	2	6+10	2	0+1	0	0	0	1	0
33	MF	(England) ENG	Ian Westlake	5	0	0+4	0	0	0	0+1	0	0	0
Forwards
9	FW	(Spain) ESP	Pablo Couñago	48	21	28+11	17	2	0	2	1	5	3
10	FW	(England) ENG	Alun Armstrong	24	2	9+10	1	0	0	0+1	0	4	1
16	FW	(England) ENG	Marcus Bent	38	12	25+7	11	2	0	0+1	0	2+1	1
17	FW	(England) ENG	Dean Bowditch	5	0	0+5	0	0	0	0	0	0	0
18	FW	(England) ENG	Darren Bent	44	18	24+11	12	0+2	3	3	2	1+3	1
29	FW	(England) ENG	Antonio Murray	1	0	0+1	0	0	0	0	0	0	0
Players transferred out during the season
3	DF	(England) ENG	Jamie Clapham	36	3	26	1	1	1	3	1	6	0
5	DF	(Iceland) ISL	Hermann Hreiðarsson	36	0	28	0	2	0	3	0	3	0
11	FW	(England) ENG	Marcus Stewart	4	1	3	0	0	0	0	0	1	1
17	DF	(England) ENG	Wayne Brown	11	1	7	0	0	0	1	0	3	1
20	FW	(England) ENG	Richard Logan	1	0	0	0	0	0	0+1	0	0	0
22	MF	(England) ENG	Darren Ambrose	37	11	20+9	8	1+1	1	2	1	3+1	1
25	MF	(France) FRA	Ulrich Le Pen	1	0	0	0	0	0	0	0	0+1	0
31	GK	(England) ENG	Paul Gerrard	5	0	5	0	0	0	0	0	0	0

Last updated: end of season
Source: Competitions

=== Goalscorers ===
No.	Pos	Nat	Player	First Division	FA Cup	League Cup	UEFA Cup	Total
9	FW	(Spain)	Pablo Couñago	17	0	1	3	21
18	FW	(England)	Darren Bent	12	3	2	1	18
16	FW	(England)	Marcus Bent	11	0	0	1	12
22	MF	(England)	Darren Ambrose	8	1	1	1	11
21	MF	(England)	Tommy Miller	6	1	1	2	10
8	MF	(Republic of Ireland)	Matt Holland	7	0	0	0	7
23	DF	(Denmark)	Thomas Gaardsøe	4	1	1	1	7
3	DF	(England)	Jamie Clapham	1	1	1	0	3
7	MF	(Northern Ireland)	Jim Magilton	3	0	0	0	3
17	DF	(England)	Wayne Brown	0	0	1	0	
0	DF	(Netherlands)	Fabian Wilnis	2	0	0	0	2
4	DF	(England)	John McGreal	1	0	0	1	2
10	FW	(England)	Alun Armstrong	1	0	0	1	2
12	DF	(England)	Richard Naylor	2	0	0	0	2
30	MF	(Netherlands)	Martijn Reuser	2	0	0	0	2
11	FW	(England)	Marcus Stewart	0	0	0	1	1
14	MF	(England)	Jermaine Wright	1	0	0	0	1
19	MF	(Nigeria)	Finidi George	1	0	0	0	1
Own goal				1	0	0	0	1
Total				80	7	7	13	107

=== Clean sheets ===
No.	Nat	Player	First Division	FA Cup	League Cup	UEFA Cup	Total
1	(England)	Andy Marshall	9	1	0	2	12
31	(England)	Paul Gerrard	1	0	0	0	1
Total			10	1	0	2	13

=== Disciplinary record ===
No.	Pos.	Name	First Division		FA Cup		League Cup		UEFA Cup		Total	
No.	Pos.	Name	Booked	Sent off (straight red)	Booked	Sent off (straight red)	Booked	Sent off (straight red)	Booked	Sent off (straight red)	Booked	Sent off (straight red)
1	GK	(England) Andy Marshall	1	0	0	0	0	0	1	0	2	0
2	DF	(Netherlands) Fabian Wilnis	3	0	0	0	0	0	0	0	3	0
3	DF	(England) Jamie Clapham	1	0	0	0	1	0	0	0	2	0
4	DF	(England) John McGreal	3	0	0	0	0	0	2	0	5	0
5	DF	(Iceland) Hermann Hreiðarsson	5	1	0	0	0	0	0	0	5	1
6	DF	(England) Mark Venus	3	0	0	0	0	0	0	0	3	0
7	MF	(Northern Ireland) Jim Magilton	3	0	0	0	0	0	0	0	3	0
8	MF	(Republic of Ireland) Matt Holland	3	0	0	0	0	0	0	0	3	0
9	FW	(Spain) Pablo Couñago	5	2	0	0	0	0	1	0	6	2
14	MF	(England) Jermaine Wright	1	0	0	0	0	0	0	0	1	0
15	DF	(England) Chris Makin	8	1	0	0	0	0	0	0	8	1
16	FW	(England) Marcus Bent	2	0	1	0	0	0	0	0	3	0
18	FW	(England) Darren Ambrose	1	0	0	0	0	0	0	0	1	0
19	MF	(Nigeria) Finidi George	0	0	0	0	0	0	1	0	1	0
21	MF	(England) Tommy Miller	3	0	1	0	0	0	0	0	4	0
22	MF	(England) Darren Ambrose	2	0	0	0	0	0	0	0	2	0
23	DF	(Denmark) Thomas Gaardsøe	5	0	1	0	0	0	2	0	8	0
30	MF	(Netherlands) Martijn Reuser	1	0	0	0	0	0	0	0	1	0
Total			50	4	3	0	1	0	7	0	61	4

=== Starting 11 ===
Considering starts in all competitions

No.	Pos.	Nat.	Name	MS	Notes
1	GK	(England)	Andy Marshall	50	
2	RWB	(Netherlands)	Fabian Wilnis	41	
15	CB	(England)	Chris Makin	38	
23	CB	(Denmark)	Thomas Gaardsøe	42	
5	CB	(Iceland)	Hermann Hreiðarsson	36	
3	LWB	(England)	Jamie Clapham	36	Darren Ambrose has 26 starts
8	CM	(Republic of Ireland)	Matt Holland	52	
14	CM	(England)	Jermaine Wright	33	Tommy Miller has 30 starts
7	CM	(Northern Ireland)	Jim Magilton	44	
18	CF	(England)	Marcus Bent	29	Darren Bent has 28 starts
9	CF	(Spain)	Pablo Couñago	37	

3–5–2 Formation

== Awards ==
=== Player awards ===
Award	Player	Ref
Player of the Year	(Republic of Ireland) Matt Holland	
Players' Player of the Year	(Spain) Pablo Couñago	
Young Player of the Year	(England) Darren Bent	
