= 2007–08 Ipswich Town F.C. season =

Ipswich Town
2007–08 season
- Chairman: David Sheepshanks
- Manager: Jim Magilton
- Stadium: Portman Road
- Championship: 8th
- FA Cup: Third round
- League Cup: First round
- Top goalscorer: League: Jonathan Walters (13); All: Jonathan Walters (13)
- Highest home attendance: 29,656 (vs Norwich City, 13 Apr 2008, Championship)
- Lowest home attendance: 17,938 (vs Leicester City, 11 Dec 2007, Championship)
- Average home league attendance: 21,935
Home colours	Away colours	Third colours

During the 2007–08 English football season, Ipswich Town competed in the Football League Championship.

== Season summary ==
Despite making a strong challenge for promotion during the season, Ipswich Town were denied the chance to participate in the play-offs for promotion to the Premier League on the last day of the season, with Crystal Palace and Watford taking the play-off places instead.

== First-team squad ==
Note: Flags indicate national team as defined under FIFA eligibility rules; some limited exceptions apply. Players may hold more than one non-FIFA nationality.

No.	Pos.	Nation	Player
2	DF	NED	Fabian Wilnis
4	DF	CAN	Jason de Vos (captain)
5	DF	IRL	Alex Bruce
6	DF	ENG	Richard Naylor
7	MF	IRL	Owen Garvan
8	MF	FRA	Sylvain Legwinski
9	FW	ESP	Pablo Couñago
10	MF	ENG	Tommy Miller
11	MF	WAL	Gavin Williams
14	FW	IRL	Alan Lee
15	DF	ESP	Sito

No.	Pos.	Nation	Player
18	FW	ENG	Danny Haynes
19	FW	IRL	Jonathan Walters
20	DF	ENG	David Wright
21	DF	ENG	Danny Simpson (on loan from Manchester United)
22	MF	ENG	Gary Roberts
23	DF	ENG	Dan Harding
25	MF	IRL	Alan Quinn
26	MF	MKD	Veliče Šumulikoski
28	MF	ENG	David Norris
32	FW	FIN	Shefki Kuqi (on loan from Crystal Palace)
43	GK	ENG	Stephen Bywater (on loan from Derby County)

=== Left club during season ===
Note: Flags indicate national team as defined under FIFA eligibility rules; some limited exceptions apply. Players may hold more than one non-FIFA nationality.

No.	Pos.	Nation	Player
1	GK	IRL	Shane Supple (on loan to Falkirk)
3	DF	ENG	Matt Richards (on loan to Brighton & Hove Albion)
12	MF	CAN	Jaime Peters (on loan to Yeovil Town)

No.	Pos.	Nation	Player
21	MF	IRL	George O'Callaghan (to Cork City)
24	FW	IRL	Billy Clarke (on loan to Falkirk)
27	GK	SCO	Neil Alexander (to Rangers)

=== Reserve squad ===
Note: Flags indicate national team as defined under FIFA eligibility rules; some limited exceptions apply. Players may hold more than one non-FIFA nationality.

No.	Pos.	Nation	Player
13	GK	IRL	Nick Colgan
16	DF	NIR	Chris Casement
17	FW	ENG	Dean Bowditch
29	MF	ENG	Ed Upson
31	DF	IRL	Michael Synnott

No.	Pos.	Nation	Player
35	DF	ENG	Tommy Smith
36	MF	ENG	Liam Trotter
37	GK	ENG	Andrew Plummer
38	FW	ENG	Jordan Rhodes

=== Left club during season ===
Note: Flags indicate national team as defined under FIFA eligibility rules; some limited exceptions apply. Players may hold more than one non-FIFA nationality.

No. / Pos. / Nation / Player; 30 / MF / ENG / Sammy Moore (to Stevenage Borough)	No. / Pos. / Nation / Player; 32 / DF / ENG / Ian Miller (to Darlington)

== Coaching staff ==
Position	Name
Manager	(Northern Ireland) Jim Magilton
Assistant Manager	(England) Bryan Klug
Goalkeeping Coach	(England) Andy Rhodes
Specialist Skills Coach	(England) Steve Foley
Fitness Coach	(England) Simon Thadani
Head Physiotherapist	(England) Matt Byard

== Pre-season ==
=== Legend ===
Win	Draw	Loss

Date	Opponent	Venue	Result	Attendance	Scorers
10 July 2007	Burton Albion	A	3–0	935	Richards, Lee (2) (pen)
12 July 2007	Kettering Town	A	3–1	Unknown	O'Callaghan, Clarke, Synnott
18 July 2007	Stevenage	A	0–3	Unknown	
19 July 2007	Chelmsford City	A	2–2	Unknown	Unknown (o.g.) Moore
21 July 2007	Rushden & Diamonds	A	2–1	1,060	Walters, Roberts
24 July 2007	Crawley Town	A	5–1	1,043	Miller (3) (pen), Lee (2)
27 July 2007	Bury Town	A	6–1	1,926	Clarke (3), Haynes, Garvan, Robinson
31 July 2007	Royal Antwerp	A	1–1	Unknown	Roberts
3 August 2007	Leiston	A	P		
5 August 2007	Panathinaikos	H	2–0	8,165	Couñago (2)
7 August 2007	(England) Dartford	A	3–1	649	Roberts, Clarke, O'Callaghan

== Competitions ==
=== Football League Championship ===
==== League table ====
Pos	Team	Pld	W	D	L	GF	GA	GD	Pts	Promotion, qualification or relegation
6	Watford	46	18	16	12	62	56	+6	70	Qualification for Championship play-offs
7	Wolverhampton Wanderers	46	18	16	12	53	48	+5	70	
8	Ipswich Town	46	18	15	13	65	56	+9	69	
9	Sheffield United	46	17	15	14	56	51	+5	66	
10	Plymouth Argyle	46	17	13	16	60	50	+10	64	

Updated to match(es) played on 4 May 2008. Source: The Football League
Rules for classification: 1) points; 2) goal difference; 3) number of goals scored.

==== Legend ====
Win	Draw	Loss

Ipswich Town's score comes first

==== Matches ====
Date	Opponent	Venue	Result	Attendance	Scorers
11 August 2007	Sheffield Wednesday	H	4–1	23,099	Lee (2) (pen), Roberts, Couñago
18 August 2007	Plymouth Argyle	A	1–1	13,260	Lee
26 August 2007	Crystal Palace	H	1–0	19,382	Walters
1 September 2007	Watford	A	0–2	17,295	
15 September 2007	West Bromwich Albion	A	0–4	19,460	
22 September 2007	Coventry City	H	4–1	18,840	de Vos, Couñago (2), Walters
29 September 2007	Hull City	A	1–3	15,456	Harding
2 October 2007	Burnley	A	2–2	9,952	Legwinski, Lee
6 October 2007	Preston North End	H	2–1	19,243	Lee, Miller
20 October 2007	Queens Park Rangers	A	1–1	13,946	Legwinski
23 October 2007	Colchester United	H	3–1	25,727	Walters, Trotter, Haynes
27 October 2007	Wolverhampton Wanderers	H	3-0	23,308	Lee, Couñago, Haynes
4 November 2007	Norwich City	A	2–2	25,461	Lee, Couñago
6 November 2007	Sheffield United	A	1–3	25,033	Walters
10 November 2007	Bristol City	H	6–0	22,020	Walters (3), Wright, Miller (pen), Couñago
24 November 2007	Cardiff City	A	0–1	15,173	
27 November 2007	Southampton	H	2–0	19,791	Walters, Couñago
1 December 2007	Barnsley	H	0–0	19,540	
4 December 2007	Bristol City	A	0–2	14,062	
8 December 2007	Charlton Athletic	A	1–3	24,680	Couñago
11 December 2007	Leicester City	H	3–1	17,938	Couñago, Lee (pen), Walters
15 December 2007	Scunthorpe United	H	3–2	19,306	Couñago, Garvan, Miller
22 December 2007	Burnley	H	0–0	20,077	
26 December 2007	Leicester City	A	0–2	24,049	
29 December 2007	Coventry City	A	1–2	18,346	Haynes
1 January 2008	West Bromwich Albion	H	2–0	24,000	Wright, de Vos
12 January 2008	Stoke City	H	1–1	20,346	Haynes
19 January 2008	Blackpool	A	1–1	9,154	Walters
29 January 2008	Plymouth Argyle	H	0–0	20,095	
2 February 2008	Sheffield Wednesday	A	2–1	19,092	Quinn, Lee
9 February 2008	Watford	H	1–2	24,227	Walters
12 February 2008	Crystal Palace	A	1–0	16,090	Haynes
16 February 2008	Blackpool	H	2–1	21,059	Šumulikoski, Walters
23 February 2008	Stoke City	A	0–1	23,563	
1 March 2008	Southampton	A	1–1	23,299	David Norris
4 March 2008	Sheffield United	H	1–1	20,190	Lee
11 March 2008	Barnsley	A	1–4	11,333	Couñago
15 March 2008	Charlton Athletic	H	2–0	23,539	Garvan, Haynes
22 March 2008	Scunthorpe United	A	2–1	6,636	Couñago, Sito
29 March 2008	Queens Park Rangers	H	0–0	24,570	
5 April 2008	Colchester United	A	0–2	6,264	
9 April 2008	Cardiff City	H	1–1	20,311	Rhodes
13 April 2008	Norwich City	H	2–1	29,656	Pearce (o.g.), Haynes
19 April 2008	Wolverhampton Wanderers	A	1–1	26,072	Miller
26 April 2008	Preston North End	A	2–2	14,187	Miller, Walters
4 May 2008	Hull City	H	1–0	28,233	Lee

=== FA Cup ===
Round	Date	Opponent	Venue	Result	Attendance	Goalscorers
R3	5 January 2008	Portsmouth	H	0–1	23,446	

=== League Cup ===
Round	Date	Opponent	Venue	Result	Attendance	Goalscorers
R1	14 August 2007	Milton Keynes Dons	A	3–3 (lost 3–5 on pens)	7,496	Lee (pen), Murphy (o.g.), Garvan

== Transfers ==
=== Transfers in ===
Date	Pos	Name	From	Fee	Ref
13 July 2007	FW	(Spain) Pablo Couñago	(Spain) Málaga	Free transfer	
16 July 2007	GK	(Scotland) Neil Alexander	(Wales) Cardiff City	Free transfer	
19 July 2007	MF	(England) Tommy Miller	(England) Sunderland	Free transfer	
23 January 2008	MF	(Republic of Ireland) Alan Quinn	(England) Sheffield United	Undisclosed	
28 January 2008	MF	(North Macedonia) Veliče Šumulikoski	(Turkey) Bursaspor	Undisclosed	
31 January 2008	MF	(England) David Norris	(England) Plymouth Argyle	Undisclosed	
31 January 2008	GK	(Republic of Ireland) Nick Colgan	Free agent	Free transfer	

=== Loans in ===
Date from	Pos	Name	From	Date until	Ref
31 January 2008	GK	(England) Stephen Bywater	(England) Derby County	30 June 2008	
15 March 2008	FW	(Finland) Shefki Kuqi	(England) Crystal Palace	30 June 2008	
21 March 2008	DF	(England) Danny Simpson	(England) Manchester United	30 June 2008	

=== Transfers out ===
Date	Pos	Name	To	Fee	Ref
3 June 2007	DF	(England) James Krause	(England) Rushden & Diamonds	Free transfer	
1 July 2007	MF	(England) Darren Currie	(England) Luton Town	Free transfer	
1 July 2007	MF	(England) Martin Brittain	(England) Carlisle United	Free transfer	
1 July 2007	MF	(England) Stuart O'Keefe	(England) Southend United	Free transfer	
1 July 2007	FW	(England) Darryl Knights	(England) Yeovil Town	Free transfer	
1 July 2007	FW	(England) Kieron Leabon	(England) Boston United	Free transfer	
27 July 2007	GK	(Wales) Lewis Price	(England) Derby County	Undisclosed	
11 January 2008	DF	(England) Ian Miller	(England) Darlington	Free transfer	
24 January 2008	MF	(England) Sammy Moore	(England) Stevenage Borough	Free transfer	
30 January 2008	GK	(Scotland) Neil Alexander	(Scotland) Rangers	£500,000	
31 January 2008	MF	(Republic of Ireland) George O'Callaghan	(Republic of Ireland) Cork City	Free transfer	

=== Loans out ===
Date from	Pos	Name	From	Date until	Ref
25 July 2007	MF	(England) Sammy Moore	(England) Brentford	6 January 2008	
30 July 2007	DF	(England) Ian Miller	(England) Darlington	10 January 2008	
31 August 2007	MF	(Republic of Ireland) George O'Callaghan	(England) Brighton & Hove Albion	1 January 2008	
18 September 2007	DF	(England) Matt Richards	(England) Brighton & Hove Albion	30 June 2008	
10 October 2007	FW	(England) Jordan Rhodes	(England) Oxford United	10 November 2007	
22 November 2007	FW	(England) Dean Bowditch	(England) Northampton Town	22 January 2008	
17 January 2008	DF	(England) Matt Richards	(England) Brighton & Hove Albion	30 June 2008	
30 January 2008	MF	(Canada) Jaime Peters	(England) Yeovil Town	4 May 2008	
31 January 2008	GK	(Republic of Ireland) Shane Supple	(Scotland) Falkrik	30 June 2008	
31 January 2008	FW	(Republic of Ireland) Billy Clarke	(Scotland) Falkrik	30 June 2008	
12 February 2008	FW	(England) Dean Bowditch	(England) Brighton & Hove Albion	5 March 2008	
12 February 2008	MF	(England) Gary Roberts	(England) Crewe Alexandra	12 March 2008	
20 February 2008	DF	(England) Tommy Smith	(England) Stevenage Borough	27 April 2008	

== Squad statistics ==
All statistics updated as of end of season

=== Appearances and goals ===
No.	Pos	Nat	Player	Total		Championship		FA Cup		League Cup	
No.	Pos	Nat	Player	Apps	Goals	Apps	Goals	Apps	Goals	Apps	Goals
Goalkeepers
43	GK	(England) ENG	Stephen Bywater	17	0	17	0	0	0	0	0
Defenders
2	DF	(Netherlands) NED	Fabian Wilnis	14	0	9+4	0	1	0	0	0
4	DF	(Canada) CAN	Jason de Vos	47	2	46	2	0	0	1	0
5	DF	(Republic of Ireland) IRL	Alex Bruce	38	0	35+1	0	1	0	1	0
6	DF	(England) ENG	Richard Naylor	8	0	6+1	0	0+1	0	0	0
15	DF	(Spain) ESP	Sito	14	1	11+2	1	1	0	0	0
16	DF	(Northern Ireland) NIR	Chris Casement	3	0	2+1	0	0	0	0	0
20	DF	(England) ENG	David Wright	43	2	39+2	2	1	0	1	0
21	DF	(England) ENG	Danny Simpson	8	0	7+1	0	0	0	0	0
23	DF	(England) ENG	Dan Harding	31	1	29+1	1	0	0	1	0
Midfielders
7	MF	(Republic of Ireland) IRL	Owen Garvan	45	3	39+4	2	1	0	1	1
8	MF	(France) FRA	Sylvain Legwinski	16	2	9+6	2	0	0	0+1	0
10	MF	(England) ENG	Tommy Miller	38	5	32+5	5	0	0	1	0
11	MF	(Wales) WAL	Gavin Williams	14	0	10+3	0	1	0	0	0
22	MF	(England) ENG	Gary Roberts	22	1	10+11	1	0	0	1	0
25	MF	(Republic of Ireland) IRL	Alan Quinn	16	1	14+2	1	0	0	0	0
26	MF	(North Macedonia) MKD	Veliče Šumulikoski	16	1	10+6	1	0	0	0	0
28	MF	(England) ENG	David Norris	9	1	9	1	0	0	0	0
36	MF	(England) ENG	Liam Trotter	8	1	2+5	1	1	0	0	0
Forwards
9	FW	(Spain) ESP	Pablo Couñago	45	12	35+8	12	1	0	1	0
14	FW	(Republic of Ireland) IRL	Alan Lee	47	12	37+8	11	0+1	0	1	1
18	FW	(England) ENG	Danny Haynes	42	7	18+22	7	1	0	0+1	0
19	FW	(Republic of Ireland) IRL	Jonathan Walters	41	13	39+1	13	0	0	1	0
32	FW	(Finland) FIN	Shefki Kuqi	4	0	2+2	0	0	0	0	0
38	FW	(England) ENG	Jordan Rhodes	8	1	0+8	1	0	0	0	0
Players transferred out during the season
12	MF	(Canada) CAN	Jamie Peters	6	0	0+5	0	0+1	0	0	0
21	MF	(Republic of Ireland) IRL	George O'Callaghan	1	0	1	0	0	0	0	0
24	FW	(Republic of Ireland) IRL	Billy Clarke	22	0	9+11	0	1	0	0+1	0
27	GK	(Scotland) SCO	Neil Alexander	31	0	29	0	1	0	1	0

Last updated: end of season
Source: Competitions

=== Goalscorers ===
No.	Pos	Nat	Player	Championship	FA Cup	League Cup	Total
19	FW	(Republic of Ireland)	Jonathan Walters	13	0	0	13
9	FW	(Spain)	Pablo Couñago	12	0	0	12
14	FW	(Republic of Ireland)	Alan Lee	11	0	1	12
18	FW	(England)	Danny Haynes	7	0	0	7
10	MF	(England)	Tommy Miller	5	0	0	5
7	MF	(Republic of Ireland)	Owen Garvan	2	0	1	3
4	DF	(Canada)	Jason de Vos	2	0	0	2
8	MF	(France)	Sylvain Legwinski	2	0	0	2
20	DF	(England)	David Wright	2	0	0	2
15	DF	(Spain)	Sito	1	0	0	1
22	MF	(England)	Gary Roberts	1	0	0	1
23	DF	(England)	Dan Harding	1	0	0	1
25	MF	(Republic of Ireland)	Alan Quinn	1	0	0	1
26	MF	(North Macedonia)	Veliče Šumulikoski	1	0	0	1
28	MF	(England)	David Norris	1	0	0	1
36	MF	(England)	Liam Trotter	1	0	0	1
38	FW	(England)	Jordan Rhodes	1	0	0	1
Own goal				1	0	1	2
Total				65	0	3	68

=== Clean sheets ===
Number	Nation	Name	Championship	FA Cup	League Cup	Total
27	(Scotland)	Neil Alexander	8	0	0	8
43	(England)	Stephen Bywater	4	0	0	4
Total			12	0	0	12

=== Disciplinary record ===
No.	Pos.	Name	Championship		FA Cup		League Cup		Total	
No.	Pos.	Name	Yellow card	Red card	Yellow card	Red card	Yellow card	Red card	Yellow card	Red card
2	DF	(Netherlands) Fabian Wilnis	0	1	0	0	0	0	0	1
4	DF	(Canada) Jason de Vos	4	0	0	0	0	0	4	0
5	DF	(Republic of Ireland) Alex Bruce	3	0	0	0	0	0	3	0
7	MF	(Republic of Ireland) Owen Garvan	3	0	0	0	0	0	3	0
8	MF	(France) Sylvain Legwinski	2	0	0	0	0	0	2	0
9	FW	(Spain) Pablo Couñago	4	1	1	0	0	0	5	1
10	MF	(England) Tommy Miller	2	1	0	0	0	0	2	1
11	MF	(Wales) Gavin Williams	4	0	0	0	0	0	4	0
14	FW	(Republic of Ireland) Alan Lee	3	0	1	0	0	0	4	0
15	DF	(Spain) Sito	2	1	0	0	0	0	2	1
18	FW	(England) Danny Haynes	6	0	0	0	0	0	6	0
19	FW	(Republic of Ireland) Jonathan Walters	1	0	0	0	0	0	1	0
20	DF	(England) David Wright	1	0	0	0	0	0	1	0
21	DF	(England) Danny Simpson	2	0	0	0	0	0	2	0
22	MF	(England) Gary Roberts	5	0	0	0	0	0	5	0
23	DF	(England) Dan Harding	3	0	0	0	1	0	4	0
24	FW	(Republic of Ireland) Billy Clarke	1	0	0	0	1	0	2	0
25	MF	(Republic of Ireland) Alan Quinn	1	0	0	0	0	0	1	0
27	GK	(Scotland) Neil Alexander	2	0	0	0	0	0	2	0
36	MF	(England) Liam Trotter	1	0	0	1	0	0	1	1
43	GK	(England) Stephen Bywater	1	0	0	0	0	0	1	0
Total			51	4	2	1	2	0	55	5

== Awards ==
=== Player awards ===
Award	Player	Ref
Player of the Year	(Republic of Ireland) Jonathan Walters	
Players' Player of the Year	(Republic of Ireland) Jonathan Walters	
Young Player of the Year	(England) Jordan Rhodes	
Goal of the Season	(Spain) Pablo Couñago	
