= Scott Mitchell (footballer) =

English footballer (born 1985)

Personal information
- Full name: Scott Andrew Mitchell
- Date of birth: 2 September 1985 (age 41)
- Place of birth: Ely, England
- Position: Defender

Senior career*
Years	Team	Apps	(Gls)
2003–2006	Ipswich Town	2	(0)
2006–2008	Livingston	41	(4)
2008	Peterborough United	5	(0)
2008	→ Stevenage Borough (loan)	6	(0)
2008	Rushden & Diamonds	0	(0)
2008–2009	King's Lynn	33	(2)
2009–2014	Lowestoft Town		
2014–2015	Leiston		
Total		87	(6)
- * Club domestic league appearances and goals as of 18:11, 10 June 2008 (UTC)

Scott Andrew Mitchell (born 2 September 1985) is an English former professional footballer.

== Playing career ==
Mitchell began his career with Ipswich Town, joining at the age of 10. He made his debut against Derby County in November 2003 and made four appearances for the first-team. He was not offered a new contract at the end of the 2005–06 season and joined Scottish First Division side Livingston in May 2006 on a two-year contract, where he made over 40 first-team appearances for the club. He joined Peterborough United on a short-term contract in January 2008 and made five appearances for Peterborough in Football League Two. He then joined Conference National side Rushden & Diamonds in June 2008. In August 2009, Mitchell joined the Suffolk coastal side Lowestoft Town playing in the Isthmian League Division One North. Mitchell was confirmed as signed for Leiston on 21 July 2014.

== Later career ==
Mitchell joined his former club Ipswich Town as an academy coach in 2011. After retiring from playing, he became the Head of Academy Performance Analysis at Ipswich in 2016. In 2017, he became the club's Head of Academy Recruitment.

In June 2026, Mitchell became Director of Football at Leyton Orient

== Career statistics ==
Appearances and goals by club, season and competition
Club	Season	League			National Cup		League Cup		Other		Total	
Club	Season	Division	Apps	Goals	Apps	Goals	Apps	Goals	Apps	Goals	Apps	Goals
Ipswich Town	2003–04	First Division	2	0	0	0	0	0	0	0	2	0
Ipswich Town	2004–05	Championship	0	0	1	0	1	0	0	0	2	0
Ipswich Town	2005–06	Championship	0	0	0	0	0	0	—		0	0
Ipswich Town	Total		2	0	1	0	1	0	0	0	4	0
Livingston	2006–07	Scottish First Division	32	4	2	0	2	0	1 (Note: Appearance in Scottish Challenge Cup)	0	37	4
Livingston	2007–08	Scottish First Division	9	0	0	0	1	0	1	0	11	0
Livingston	Total		41	4	2	0	3	0	2	0	48	4
Peterborough United	2007–08	League Two	5	0	1	0	0	0	0	0	6	0
Career total			48	4	4	0	4	0	2	0	58	4
