= Aidan Collins =

English footballer

Personal information
- Full name: Aidan Arthur Collins
- Date of birth: 18 October 1986 (age 40)
- Place of birth: Chelmsford, England
- Position: Defender

Senior career*
| Years | Team | Apps | (Gls) |
| 2003–2006 | Ipswich Town | 4 | (0) |
| 2006 | → Wycombe Wanderers (loan) | 5 | (1) |
| 2006 | → Stockport County (loan) | 3 | (0) |
| 2007 | Cambridge United | 11 | (0) |
| 2007–2008 | Chelmsford City | | |
| 2008–2009 | Maldon & Tiptree | | |
| Total | | 23 | (1) |
- * Club domestic league appearances and goals

Aidan Arthur Collins (born 18 October 1986) is an English retired footballer who played as a defender. He made over 25 appearances in the Football League and the Conference National League.

== Club career ==
Collins began his career at Ipswich and made his debut against Derby County 4–1 in May 2003. He collected a winners medal when Ipswich won the FA Youth Cup in April 2005 and made four league and cup appearances for the first-team in the 2005–06 season before joining Wycombe Wanderers on loan in January 2006. He made five appearances for Wycombe, scoring once, and then joined Stockport County on loan in March 2006, where he started two games before being recalled by Ipswich a month later. He has one England U18 cap.

Collins was not offered a new contract at Ipswich at the end of the 2005–06 season and joined Cambridge United in January 2007 for one month on a non-contract basis. He started three games for Cambridge and agreed a contract until the end of the 2006–07 season with manager Jimmy Quinn saying, "He's a fantastic addition to the team..." In March 2007, he appeared with his brother, Jordan Collins in Cambridge's club-record 7–0 win over Weymouth, the first pair of siblings to appear for the club since November 1995. At the end of the season, he retired from the game due to injury but later joined Chelmsford City F.C. in August 2007. Assistant-manager Glenn Pennyfather said of him, "Aidan is a fantastic signing. He is young, strong, good in the air in both boxes and reads the game well with excellent distribution."

== Personal life ==
Collins has an undergraduate degree from Goldsmiths, University of London, and a Masters and PhD from the University of York in history. His book, 'Financial Failure in Early Modern England' has been published by Boydell and Brewer Press.

== Career statistics ==
Appearances and goals by club, season and competition
| Club | Season | League | | | FA Cup | | League Cup | | Other | | Total | |
| Club | Season | Division | Apps | Goals | Apps | Goals | Apps | Goals | Apps | Goals | Apps | Goals |
|---|---|---|---|---|---|---|---|---|---|---|---|---|
| Ipswich Town | 2002–03 | First Division | 1 | 0 | 0 | 0 | 0 | 0 | — | | 1 | 0 |
| Ipswich Town | 2003–04 | First Division | 0 | 0 | 0 | 0 | 0 | 0 | 0 | 0 | 0 | 0 |
| Ipswich Town | 2004–05 | Championship | 0 | 0 | 0 | 0 | 0 | 0 | 0 | 0 | 0 | 0 |
| Ipswich Town | 2005–06 | Championship | 3 | 0 | 0 | 0 | 1 | 0 | — | | 4 | 0 |
| Ipswich Town | Total | | 4 | 0 | 0 | 0 | 1 | 0 | 0 | 0 | 5 | 0 |
| Wycombe Wanderers (loan) | 2005–06 | League Two | 5 | 1 | 0 | 0 | 0 | 0 | 0 | 0 | 5 | 1 |
| Stockport County (loan) | 2005–06 | League Two | 3 | 0 | 0 | 0 | 0 | 0 | 0 | 0 | 3 | 0 |
| Cambridge United | 2006–07 | Conference National | 11 | 0 | 0 | 0 | — | | 0 | 0 | 11 | 0 |
| Career total | | | 23 | 1 | 0 | 0 | 1 | 0 | 0 | 0 | 24 | 1 |

== Honours ==
Ipswich Town

- FA Youth Cup: 2004–05
