= Gerard Nash (footballer) =

Irish footballer

Personal information
- Date of birth: 11 July 1986 (age 40)
- Place of birth: Leixlip, County Kildare, Ireland
- Height: 6 ft 1 in (1.85 m)
- Position: Defender

Team information
- Current team: Mjällby AIF (assistant coach)

Youth career
- Leixlip United
- Belvedere
- 2002–2003: Ipswich Town

Senior career*
Years	Team	Apps	(Gls)
2003–2006	Ipswich Town	1	(0)
2006	→ Hartlepool United (loan)	3	(0)
2006	→ Southend United (loan)	0	(0)
Total		4	(0)

Managerial career
- 2013–2016: Ipswich Town U18
- 2016–2020: Ipswich Town U23
- 2021–2022: FAI (High Performance Coach)
- 2022–2024: Aston Villa U18
- 2024–2025: GAIS (First Team Coach)
- 2025: Cork City
- 2025–: Mjällby (Assistant Coach)
- * Club domestic league appearances and goals

Gerard Nash (born 11 July 1986) is an Irish former professional footballer and coach, who is currently the assistant coach of Allsvenskan club Mjällby.

Nash played his youth football with Leixlip United and Belvedere before joining the Ipswich Town academy. He played for Ipswich Town and also spent time on loan at Hartlepool United and Southend United before he was forced to retire in 2006 due to complications occurring after two cruciate ligament injuries.

He subsequently took up coaching roles at Ipswich, becoming the U18s manager in 2013 and later the same position in the U23s in 2016.

He departed the club in May 2021 joining the Football Association of Ireland as High Performance Coach.

In June 2022, he left the FAI, joining Aston Villa as U18 Head Coach, before, in August 2024, joining GAIS of the Swedish Allsvenskan as a First Team Coach.

== Playing career ==
Nash began his career playing youth football for his hometown club Leixlip United in Ireland. He also played youth football for Belvedere before moving to England to join the Ipswich Town academy in 2002.

He made his first and only appearance for Ipswich as a second-half substitute in a 6–1 home win over Burnley at Portman Road on 14 October 2003. He also spent time on loan at Hartlepool United and Southend United during the 2005–06 season.

Nash was called up to the Republic of Ireland U21 side in January 2006. Although he had to pull out of the squad later that month due to domestic commitments.

Nash was forced to retire from playing football in 2006, at the age of 20, due to complications occurring after two cruciate ligament injuries.

== Coaching career ==
=== Early coaching ===
Upon retiring from playing, Nash joined the Ipswich Town academy as a professional development coach. He took over as manager of the Ipswich Under-18 side after Russell Osman left the club in 2013. In 2016, Nash took over the role as manager of Ipswich's Under-23 side following the departure of current Under-23s manager Mark Kennedy.

Following the departure of Mick McCarthy as Ipswich manager in April 2018, Nash worked with the first-team alongside caretaker manager Bryan Klug and fellow Under-23s coach Chris Hogg for the remainder of the 2017–18 season. He worked with the first-team alongside Bryan Klug again in October 2018, following the departure of Paul Hurst.

He led Ipswich's Under-23 side to win the Professional Development League South Division title in 2019.

In May 2021, Nash left his position at the club, joining the Football Association of Ireland as High Performance Coach.

On 15 June 2022, Nash joined Aston Villa Academy as the Under-18s coach.

In August 2024, he joined Swedish Allsvenskan club GAIS as a First Team Coach.

=== Cork City ===
On 15 May 2025, Nash was appointed as manager of League of Ireland Premier Division club Cork City. On 30 May 2025, it was announced that former Republic of Ireland midfielder David Meyler had been chosen as Nash's assistant manager. On 3 October 2025, Nash lead his side to the FAI Cup Final, after defeating St Patrick's Athletic in the Semi Final at Turners Cross. 10 days later, on 13 October 2025, Cork were officially relegated to the League of Ireland First Division with 3 games still to play, following a 2–1 loss at home to Shelbourne. On 9 November 2025, his side were defeated 2–0 by Shamrock Rovers in the 2025 FAI Cup final at the Aviva Stadium. On 23 December 2025, he stepped down as manager with immediate affect, due to personal reasons.

=== Mjällby (assistant) ===
On 30 December 2025, Nash was announced as the new assistant coach of Swedish champions Mjällby AIF.

== Personal life ==
On Thursday 6 November 2025, 3 days before managing his club in the 2025 FAI Cup final, Nash was arrested at 2:55am in Midleton, County Cork and was subsequently charged with driving under the influence of alcohol and with dangerous driving. He resigned from managing Cork City following his arrest and was remanded on bail until 14 May 2026, with a date for a court hearing set for that date at Midleton District Court.

== Career statistics ==
=== Playing career ===
Appearances and goals by club, season and competition
Club	Season	Division	League		FA Cup		League Cup		Other		Total	
Club	Season	Division	Apps	Goals	Apps	Goals	Apps	Goals	Apps	Goals	Apps	Goals
Ipswich Town	2003–04	First Division	1	0	0	0	0	0	0	0	1	0
Ipswich Town	2004–05	Championship	0	0	0	0	0	0	0	0	0	0
Ipswich Town	2005–06	Championship	0	0	0	0	0	0	—		0	0
Ipswich Town	Total		1	0	0	0	0	0	0	0	1	0
Hartlepool United (loan)	2005–06	League One	3	0	0	0	0	0	0	0	3	0
Southend United (loan)	2005–06	League One	0	0	0	0	0	0	0	0	0	0
Career total			4	0	0	0	0	0	0	0	4	0

=== Managerial career ===
As of match played 9 November 2025

Managerial record by team and tenure
Team	From	To	Record							
Team	From	To	G	W	D	L	GF	GA	GD	Win %
(Republic of Ireland) Cork City	15 May 2025	23 December 2025	26	6	6	14	27	39	−12	23.08
Total			26	6	6	14	27	39	−12	23.08
