= Danny Karbassiyoon =

American soccer player and scout

Personal information
- Full name: Daniel Karbassiyoon
- Date of birth: August 10, 1984 (age 42)
- Place of birth: Roanoke, Virginia, United States
- Height: 1.73 m (5 ft 8 in)
- Position: Left-back

Senior career*
Years	Team	Apps	(Gls)
–2003	Roanoke Star		
2003–2005	Arsenal	0	(0)
2004–2005	→ Ipswich Town (loan)	5	(0)
2005–2006	Burnley	5	(0)
2006–2007	Roanoke Star		
Total		10	(0)

International career
2003	United States U18	4	(2)
- * Club domestic league appearances and goals

Daniel Karbassiyoon (born August 10, 1984) is an American former professional soccer player who played for English sides Arsenal, Ipswich Town and Burnley. He works as a scout and IT Product Owner for Arsenal in London.

== Early life ==
Karbassiyoon was born in Roanoke, Virginia to an Italian mother and Iranian father. He holds dual American and Italian citizenship.

== Club career ==
Karbassiyoon signed a full contract with Arsenal in 2003, moving from amateur club Roanoke Star at the beginning of the previous season. Having joined as a forward, he adapted his role to that of a left-back.

Karbassiyoon's first match for Arsenal was against Manchester City in the League Cup on October 27, 2004, as a substitute for Arturo Lupoli. He marked his debut by scoring a goal in the 90th minute; the match finished 2–1. He then went on to secure a starting spot in the League Cup's next round match against Everton at Highbury where a young Arsenal side prevailed 3–1. His final match with the first team saw him play the final ten minutes of a 1–0 defeat against Manchester United at Old Trafford. However, he could not gain any sort of place in the regular Arsenal first team and, in November 2004, he was loaned out to Football League Championship team Ipswich Town for three months, making six appearances for the East Anglian side.

Arsenal released Karbassiyoon in the summer of 2005, after he had played just three times for them, all in the League Cup. He signed for Burnley soon afterwards. However, a series of injuries left Karbassiyoon unable to establish himself at Turf Moor and he was placed on the transfer list at the end of his first season at the club. His contract was terminated by mutual consent in August 2006.

Karbassiyoon had a trial at Dutch team AZ Alkmaar, but wasn't offered a contract. Owing to knee injury problems, he retired from professional football in February 2007, at the age of 22.

In April 2007, Karbassiyoon returned to Arsenal as the club's North American scout. He has been credited for scouting Costa Rican international Joel Campbell as well as German-born Gedion Zelalem. He has since also taken on the role of product manager within the club's IT department.

Karbassiyoon published an e-book, The Arsenal Yankee, which detailed his journey from player to scout in 2016.

== Career statistics ==
Appearances and goals by club, season and competition
Club	Season	League			FA Cup		EFL Cup		Total	
Club	Season	Division	Apps	Goals	Apps	Goals	Apps	Goals	Apps	Goals
Arsenal	2004–05	Premier League	0	0	0	0	3	1	3	1
Ipswich Town (loan)	2004–05	Championship	5	0	1	0	0	0	6	0
Burnley	2005–06	Championship	5	0	0	0	1	0	6	0
Career total			10	0	1	0	4	1	15	1
