= Vemund Brekke Skard =

Norwegian footballer (born 1981)

Personal information
- Full name: Vemund Brekke Skard
- Date of birth: 11 September 1981 (age 45)
- Place of birth: Norway
- Height: 1.75 m (5 ft 9 in)
- Positions: Forward; midfielder

Senior career*
Years	Team	Apps	(Gls)
2001–2006	Brumunddal	2	(0)
2006	Ipswich Town	3	(0)
2006–2007	CE L'Hospitalet		
2007–2010	Raufoss	10	(1)
2008	→ Hødd (loan)	16	(0)
2010–2014	Brumunddal	42	(0)
2012	Brumunddal 2	4	(0)
2014–2015	Stabæk Fotball 2	2	(0)
Total		79	(1)
- * Club domestic league appearances and goals

Vemund Brekke Skard (born 11 September 1981) is a Norwegian former professional footballer who played as a forward or midfielder.

== Career ==
Born in Brumunddal, Skard signed his first professional contract having joined from Norwegian Second Division side Brumunddal FK in October 2005, where he played part-time whilst also training to be a teacher. He signed for Ipswich Town in 2005 but was released early in the 2006–07 season after just three appearances for the club.

He later played for Catalan team CE L'Hospitalet, Raufoss IL in Adeccoligaen (2007) and IL Hødd (2008). After several seasons in his native Brumunddal he featured briefly for Stabæk Fotball 2 in 2014. Developing as a football coach, in 2017 he studied for the UEFA A Licence.
