= Jermaine Wright =

English footballer

Personal information
- Full name: Jermaine Malaki Wright
- Date of birth: 21 October 1975 (age 51)
- Place of birth: Greenwich, England
- Height: 5 ft 9 in (1.75 m)
- Positions: Midfielder; defender

Youth career
- ?–1992: Millwall

Senior career*
Years	Team	Apps	(Gls)
1992–1994	Millwall	0	(0)
1994–1998	Wolverhampton Wanderers	20	(0)
1996	→ Doncaster Rovers (loan)	13	(0)
1998–1999	Crewe Alexandra	49	(5)
1999–2004	Ipswich Town	184	(10)
2004–2006	Leeds United	38	(3)
2005	→ Millwall (loan)	15	(2)
2006	→ Southampton (loan)	13	(0)
2006–2008	Southampton	78	(1)
2008–2009	Blackpool	3	(0)
2010	Croydon Athletic	0	(0)
2010–2011	Lewes	26	(0)
Total		439	(21)

International career
1993	England U18	1	(0)
- * Club domestic league appearances and goals

Jermaine Malaki Wright (born 21 October 1975) is an English former professional footballer who played as a midfielder and could also operate as a defender.

== Career ==
Wright started his career at Millwall as a trainee, but moved to Wolverhampton Wanderers in 1994. At Wolves he scored once; his goal coming in a League Cup tie against Fulham in September 1995. After a loan spell at Doncaster Rovers he joined Crewe Alexandra in February 1998 for a fee of £50,000. At Crewe, his career took off under the guidance of Dario Gradi, who switched him from the right wing to a creative role in the centre of midfield.

In July 1999, after rejecting the offer of a new contract, he was transferred for a fee of £500,000 to Ipswich, where George Burley saw him as a replacement for Kieron Dyer, who had just been sold to Newcastle United. His career thrived under the guidance of Burley but then stalled after he surprisingly opted to move to relegated Leeds United rather than Everton in July 2004.

However, he fell out of favour at Leeds in 2005 and was loaned out first to Millwall (where he had started his career) and then, in January 2006, to Southampton, where he linked up with Burley once more.

After his loan spell ended, he returned to Elland Road where the remaining year of his contract was cancelled by mutual consent. He returned to Southampton for a trial during pre-season training and signed with the club on 10 July 2006 on a two-year deal keeping him at St Mary's until June 2008. He scored his only Saints goal in the 2–1 home defeat by Queens Park Rangers on 30 September 2006.

Wright was released by Southampton on 2 July 2008. During his two years at St Mary's, Wright made exactly 100 appearances, either in midfield or more often at right-back.

On 11 July 2008, Wright signed for Blackpool on a one-year deal with the option of a second. He made his debut for the Seasiders on 9 August 2008 in a 1–0 home defeat to Bristol City. However, he suffered an Achilles tendon injury in his third league match for the club against Sheffield United on 23 August and a month later he underwent an operation which kept him on the sidelines for more than four months and he never managed to establish himself in the side on his return.

On 9 June 2009, Blackpool confirmed that Wright had not been offered a new deal and that he was being released. In July 2010 newly promoted Isthmian League Premier Division side Croydon Athletic signed Wright for the new season. Following allegations that Croydon owner Mazhar Majeed was using the club for money laundering purposes, Wright followed former Crydon boss Tim O'Shea to Lewes in October 2010. Wright played an important role in helping Lewes recover from being adrift in last place but the team fell just short by one point of staying up and Wright retired at the end of the 2010–11 season.

== Personal life ==
Wright was born in Greenwich, London. His son, Drey Wright, is a professional footballer.

== Career statistics ==
Appearances and goals by club, season and competition
Club	Season	League			FA Cup		League Cup		Other		Total	
Club	Season	Division	Apps	Goals	Apps	Goals	Apps	Goals	Apps	Goals	Apps	Goals
Wolverhampton Wanderers	1994–95	First Division	6	0	0	0	0	0	1 (Note: Appearance(s) in First Division play-offs)	0	7	0
Wolverhampton Wanderers	1995–96	First Division	7	0	0	0	2	1	—		9	1
Wolverhampton Wanderers	1996–97	First Division	4	0	0	0	2	0	0	0	6	0
Wolverhampton Wanderers	1997–98	First Division	4	0	0	0	0	0	—		4	0
Wolverhampton Wanderers	Total		21	0	0	0	4	1	1	0	26	1
Doncaster Rovers (loan)	1995–96	Third Division	13	0	0	0	0	0	0	0	13	0
Crewe Alexandra	1997–98	First Division	5	0	0	0	0	0	—		5	0
Crewe Alexandra	1998–99	First Division	44	5	1	0	5	0	—		50	5
Crewe Alexandra	Total		49	5	1	0	5	0	0	0	55	5
Ipswich Town	1999–00	First Division	34	1	1	0	3	0	1	0	39	1
Ipswich Town	2000–01	Premier League	37	2	2	1	7	0	—		46	3
Ipswich Town	2001–02	Premier League	29	1	2	0	2	0	5 (Note: Appearances in UEFA Cup)	0	38	1
Ipswich Town	2002–03	First Division	39	1	2	0	3	0	3	0	47	1
Ipswich Town	2003–04	First Division	45	5	2	0	2	0	2	0	51	5
Ipswich Town	Total		184	10	9	1	17	0	11	0	221	11
Leeds United	2004–05	Championship	35	3	1	0	1	0	—		37	3
Leeds United	2005–06	Championship	3	0	0	0	0	0	0	0	3	0
Leeds United	Total		38	3	1	0	1	0	0	0	40	3
Millwall (loan)	2005–06	Championship	15	2	0	0	1	0	—		16	2
Southampton (loan)	2005–06	Championship	13	0	1	0	0	0	—		14	0
Southampton	2006–07	Championship	42	1	2	0	2	0	0	0	46	1
Southampton	2007–08	Championship	36	0	3	0	1	0	—		40	0
Southampton	Total		91	1	6	0	3	0	0	0	100	1
Blackpool	2008–09	Championship	3	0	0	0	1	0	—		4	0
Career total			414	21	17	1	32	1	12	0	475	23

== Honours ==
Ipswich Town

- Football League First Division play-offs: 2000

Individual

- Ipswich Town Players' Player of the Year: 2003–04
