= Andy Marshall =

English footballer

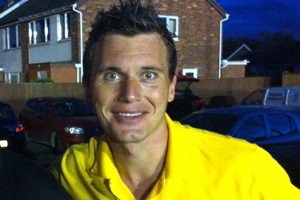
- Marshall in 2011

Personal information
- Full name: Andrew John Marshall
- Date of birth: 14 April 1975 (age 51)
- Place of birth: Bury St Edmunds, England
- Height: 1.88 m (6 ft 2 in)
- Position: Goalkeeper

Youth career
- 1992–1994: Norwich City

Senior career*
Years	Team	Apps	(Gls)
1994–2001	Norwich City	195	(0)
1996	→ AFC Bournemouth (loan)	11	(0)
1996	→ Gillingham (loan)	5	(0)
2001–2004	Ipswich Town	53	(0)
2003–2004	→ Wolverhampton Wanderers (loan)	0	(0)
2004	→ Millwall (loan)	7	(0)
2004–2006	Millwall	60	(0)
2006–2009	Coventry City	59	(0)
2009–2013	Aston Villa	0	(0)
2013–2014	Millwall	0	(0)
Total		390	(0)

International career
1993	England U18	1	(0)
1995–1997	England U21	4	(0)

Managerial career
- 2015: Aston Villa (interim)
- * Club domestic league appearances and goals

Andrew John Marshall (born 14 April 1975) is an English former professional footballer who played for Norwich City, AFC Bournemouth, Gillingham, Ipswich Town, Wolverhampton Wanderers, Millwall, Coventry City and the England under-21 team. He went into coaching, and was goalkeeping coach at Aston Villa (where he was briefly caretaker manager alongside Scott Marshall in 2015), Charlton Athletic and Birmingham City.

== Career ==
=== Norwich City ===
Born in Bury St Edmunds, Marshall began his career as a trainee with Norwich City. He made his first successful team debut on 27 December 1994 as a substitute in an away match at Nottingham Forest, following an injury to first-choice goalkeeper Bryan Gunn. Gunn's injury kept him out of action for the rest of the season and Marshall played in the majority of City's remaining matches that season. They were relegated.

Gunn was re-instated as first choice goalkeeper at Carrow Road at the start of the following season, and Marshall had loan spells at Bournemouth and Gillingham to increase his first team experience. Gunn remained first choice until the end of the 1996–97 campaign, when he was dropped for the first time in his Norwich career. Marshall seized the opportunity to establish himself as Norwich’s number one and, despite his difficulties with goal kicks—often sending the ball out for a throw-in—he became a regular starter and a popular figure among supporters during his time at Carrow Road. Marshall went on to make 219 appearances for the Canaries.

The 2000–01 season was Marshall's best for Norwich and also his last. Marshall's form in goal was a crucial factor in the team avoiding relegation. The supporters recognised his contribution by voting him as their player of the season. However, Marshall's contract was due to expire in the summer of 2001 and he had refused to sign a new deal with the club citing that he wanted to play Premier League football having proved his capabilities.

=== Ipswich ===
Marshall joined the then Premier League club Ipswich Town, also the rivals of Norwich City, on a free transfer. Ipswich had recently qualified for the UEFA Cup. The move created a great deal of anger among Ipswich and Norwich City fans alike.

Marshall sought to further his ambition of playing for England by playing regular football in the Premier League and increasing his profile.

Things never worked out for Marshall with many Ipswich fans not accepting him due to his past club. Even an impressive clean sheet at Norwich where Marshall celebrated wildly did not give him the acceptance he desired.

In November of the 2003–04 season he commenced a one-month loan spell at Wolverhampton Wanderers.

=== Millwall (loan) ===
In January 2004, Marshall began another loan spell, this time at Millwall which led to a permanent move in March 2004. During his time at the club Marshall won many Man of the Match awards and was part of the Millwall side that fulfilled every footballers' dream of playing in the 2004 FA Cup Final at the end of the 2003–04 season. In the final at Cardiff's Millennium Stadium, Millwall were beaten 3–0 by Manchester United, in which Marshall put in an outstanding performance.

Marshall remained at Millwall for the following two seasons for the duration of his contract.

=== Coventry City ===
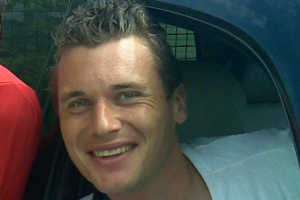
Marshall in 2008

On 30 June 2006, Marshall joined Coventry City on a free transfer becoming a favourite with the fans. For the 2006–07 season he won the London Supporters Player of the Year Trophy, the Wales Supporters Player of the Year and the Player of the Season Award as voted for by all the fans.

Marshall was released by Coventry City on 30 June 2009 after his contract expired.

=== Aston Villa ===
Marshall spent a short period on trial at Queens Park Rangers following his release from Coventry City and the club offered him a one-year contract on 3 August. However, on 12 August 2009, he signed with Aston Villa on a one-year deal to provide cover for goalkeepers Brad Friedel and Brad Guzan.

He did not feature during the first half of the 2009–10 season, after picking up an ankle injury that kept him out for six months. However, in March 2010, he returned to action. He was a member of Aston Villa's reserve side that won the 2009–10 Premier Reserve League South. He left Villa at the end of the 2009–10 season and went on trial with Charlton Athletic. However, Charlton did not sign the goalkeeper and he later rejoined Aston Villa on another one-year contract.

On 2 January 2011, following the loaning of Brad Guzan to Championship side Hull City, Marshall was named on the Aston Villa bench in a 3–3 away draw with Chelsea.

In March 2011, Marshall signed a one-year deal keeping him at the club until the end of the 2011–12 season. In the 2012–13 season he made two appearances on the bench. He was released at the end of the 2012–13 season along with Richard Dunne and Eric Lichaj.

=== Return to Millwall ===
On 8 August 2013, Marshall returned to Millwall for a second time as cover after regular goalkeeper David Forde was ruled out with injury.

Marshall announced his retirement from professional football on 31 January 2014.

== Honours ==
Millwall

- FA Cup runner-up: 2003–04

Aston Villa

- Premier Reserve League: 2009–10
