= Dean McDonald =

English footballer (born 1986)

Personal information
- Full name: Dean Louis McDonald
- Date of birth: 19 February 1986 (age 40)
- Place of birth: Lambeth, England
- Positions: Attacking midfielder; striker

Youth career
- 2002–2003: Arsenal
- 2003–2005: Ipswich Town

Senior career*
Years	Team	Apps	(Gls)
2005–2006	Ipswich Town	14	(1)
2005–2006	→ Hartlepool United (loan)	5	(1)
2006–2007	Gillingham	26	(6)
2007–2008	Inverness Caledonian Thistle	7	(0)
2008–2009	Rushden & Diamonds	3	(1)
2008	→ Grays Athletic (loan)	0	(0)
2009	Northwich Victoria	2	(1)
2009	Tooting & Mitcham United	10	(6)
2009–2011	Farnborough	90	(45)
2011–2012	Carshalton Athletic	26	(5)
2012–2013	Billericay Town		
2013	Macclesfield Town	6	(0)
2013	Sutton United	15	(2)
2013	Billericay Town	0	(0)
2013–2014	Margate	3	(0)
2014	Whitehawk	10	(0)
2014–2016	Dulwich Hamlet	37	(6)
2016–2017	Merstham		
2018	Welling United	12	(3)
2019	Whitehawk	0	(0)
- * Club domestic league appearances and goals

Dean Louis McDonald (born 19 February 1986) is an English former professional footballer who played as an attacking midfielder or striker.

== Career ==
=== Ipswich Town ===
McDonald was signed by Ipswich Town manager Joe Royle from Arsenal, where he started his career as a youth player. He opened his account with the winning goal for Ipswich on 14 February 2006 against Crewe Alexandra, with the Tractor Boys going on to win the game 2–1.

McDonald is primarily an attacking midfielder, although he can play in a more of a striker role. He spent a month on loan with Hartlepool United, scoring one goal the winner in a 2–1 win against AFC Bournemouth, before bring recalled due to an injury crisis at Ipswich, with Ipswich rejecting a bid for the player.

=== Gillingham ===
In May 2006 he signed for Gillingham on a two-year contract. On his debut for his new club in August 2006 he scored the winner in a 2–1 win over Huddersfield Town.

=== Inverness Caledonian Thistle ===
It was announced in July 2007 that, despite having a year left on his contract with the Kent club, McDonald had agreed terms for a move to Scottish Premier League side Inverness Caledonian Thistle. He scored in his first pre-season match for his new club, a 2–0 win over Qatar's U-21 team, on 11 July 2007.

Following the arrival of Craig Brewster at the club, he was restricted to just substitute appearances and was on trial during January 2008, including Gillingham and Toronto FC. Although offered a contract by Toronto FC, he decided to stay at Inverness Caledonian Thistle until the end of the 2007–08 season. Despite having a year left on his contract it was cancelled by mutual consent in July 2008.

=== Non league spells ===
McDonald then signed for Conference National side Rushden & Diamonds in July 2008. Having been transfer-listed, he signed for Grays Athletic on loan from 20 November 2008 until January 2009. However, McDonald failed to make an appearance in the Conference National and only made three appearances in the Conference League Cup, FA Trophy and Essex Senior Cup.

McDonald was released by Rushden & Diamonds in January 2009, and was signed by Northwich Victoria on non-contract terms. He left Northwich Victoria after manager Steve King departed in February. This led to a short spell at Tooting & Mitcham United, which lasted until the end of the season.

McDonald ended the 2009–10 season with 35 goals in 53 appearances in all competitions for Farnborough, earning himself a trial at Football League Championship side Swansea City. McDonald was denied a move to the club after a successful trial due to the two clubs being unable to agree a fee for the player as he had one year left on his contract.

In June 2011, McDonald signed for Isthmian League Premier Division side Carshalton Athletic. The forward made 15 league appearances in his only season as a Robin and scored five league goals, including both in a 2–0 away win at Hastings United.

On 25 January 2013, McDonald signed for Conference National side Macclesfield Town from Billericay Town, making his debut the following day in the fourth round of the FA Cup against Premier League team Wigan Athletic, coming on for 20 minutes. McDonald made his league debut on 1 February, coming on for the last ten minutes against Ebbsfleet United to provide an assist for the 4th and final goal in a 4–0 win for the club.

On 16 August 2013, McDonald signed for Conference South side Sutton United.

In September 2013, McDonald signed a short-term deal with Billericay Town, and he went on to play for Margate and Whitehawk before the end of the 2013–14 season.

In June 2014, it was announced that McDonald had signed for Dulwich Hamlet of the Isthmian League Premier Division.

After one season with Dulwich Hamlet, making 21 appearances and scoring 5 goals in all competitions, McDonald was released ahead of the 2015-16 campaign with Hamlet manager Gavin Rose commenting "Dean got too many injuries and we didn't feel we could give him another contract. But he is still a very talented player." He continued to train with the club, however, and returned to the first team for their FA Cup first qualifying round win over Hampton & Richmond Borough on 12 September 2015, coming off the bench in the 78th minute.

McDonald was once again released by Dulwich Hamlet towards the end of March 2016, with Hamlet manager Gavin Rose citing a lack of end product being behind the decision to let him go.

On 5 July 2016, McDonald joined Isthmian League Premier Division side Merstham after his release from Dulwich Hamlet.

McDonald was signed by former manager Steve King for the fifth time when he joined Welling United at the start of the 2018–19 season, but was released in October 2018.

In May 2019, McDonald re-signed for one of his former clubs when he joined Whitehawk, but left before the season started.
