= Sito (footballer, born 1980) =

Spanish footballer

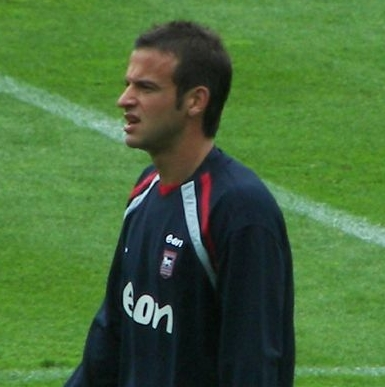
- Sito with Ipswich Town in 2006

Personal information
- Full name: Luis Castro Rodríguez
- Date of birth: 21 May 1980 (age 46)
- Place of birth: A Coruña, Spain
- Height: 1.74 m (5 ft 9 in)
- Position: Full back

Team information
- Current team: Berceo

Youth career
- 1998–1999: Deportivo La Coruña

Senior career*
Years	Team	Apps	(Gls)
1999–2001	Imperator Oar		
2001–2002	Lugo	10	(0)
2002	→ Calahorra (loan)	18	(0)
2002–2005	Racing Ferrol	60	(0)
2003	→ O Val (loan)		
2005–2008	Ipswich Town	59	(1)
2008–2012	Salamanca	73	(0)
2013	Alfaro	11	(0)
2013–2014	Peña Sport	33	(0)
2014–2018	Calahorra	102	(4)
2018–2019	SD Logroñés	25	(1)
2019–2023	Calahorra B	101	(1)
2023–2024	Berceo	34	(1)
2024–2025	Arnedo	14	(0)
2025–	Berceo	3	(0)
- * Club domestic league appearances and goals as of 28 September 2025

Luis Castro Rodríguez (born 21 May 1980), commonly known as Sito, is a Spanish professional footballer who plays for Tercera Federación club Berceo as a defender (right or left back).

== Football career ==
After starting professionally with CD Lugo and CD Calahorra, Sito spent three seasons with another Galician club, Racing Club de Ferrol – two in Segunda División and another in Segunda División B. He signed with Ipswich Town on 5 August 2005 on a free transfer, after a trial.

After two years in and out of the first team, Sito enjoyed a good spell in the 2007–08 campaign, following injuries and loss of form to those ahead of him in the pecking order. He scored his only goal for the English side and in the Championship against Scunthorpe United, helping to a 2–1 away win on 22 March 2008; previously, in early January 2006, he had extended his contract with the club until the summer of 2008.

Sito was released by Ipswich in May 2008 and returned to Spain the following month, joining UD Salamanca. His best output consisted of 35 games in his third year (34 starts), but the Charros were relegated from the second level.
