= 1999–2000 Ipswich Town F.C. season =

Ipswich Town
1999–2000 season
- Chairman: David Sheepshanks
- Manager: George Burley
- Stadium: Portman Road
- First Division: 3rd (promoted via play-offs)
- FA Cup: Third round
- League Cup: Second round
- Play-offs: Winners
- Top goalscorer: League: David Johnson (22); All: David Johnson (23)
- Highest home attendance: 21,908 (vs Walsall, 7 May 2000, First Division)
- Lowest home attendance: 14,383 (vs Southampton, 13 Dec 1999, FA Cup)
- Average home league attendance: 18,524

During the 1999–2000 English football season, Ipswich Town competed in the Football League First Division.

== Season summary ==
Ipswich finished the season in third place in the First Division, missing out on the two automatic places for promotion to the Premiership and instead took part in the play-offs for the fourth year running, to determine the third promoted team. Ipswich finished two points behind Manchester City (who were promoted in second place) and four behind league winners Charlton Athletic.

On the final day of the league season Ipswich played Walsall, and won 2–0 with two goals from Ipswich's top scorer David Johnson, who finished the season with 22 goals. At one point, after his first goal, second place Manchester City were trailing to Blackburn, meaning that Ipswich would qualify for promotion automatically. However, this only lasted nine minutes, with City eventually scoring four goals to win the match and secure promotion.

In the play-off semi-finals, Ipswich faced sixth-placed Bolton Wanderers, who had beaten them in the semi-final the previous year. After a 2–2 draw in the first leg away at the Reebok Stadium, Ipswich won 5–3 at Portman Road, winning 7–5 on aggregate.

In the play-off final, the last domestic competitive fixture at Wembley Stadium before the stadium was redeveloped, Ipswich played fourth-placed Barnsley, beating them 4–2 and finally securing their return to the Premiership after an absence of five years.

== First-team squad ==
Note: Flags indicate national team as defined under FIFA eligibility rules; some limited exceptions apply. Players may hold more than one non-FIFA nationality.

No.	Pos.	Nation	Player
1	GK	ENG	Richard Wright
2	DF	NED	Fabian Wilnis
3	DF	ENG	Jamie Clapham
4	DF	FRA	Jean-Manuel Thetis
5	DF	ENG	Tony Mowbray
6	DF	ENG	Mark Venus
7	MF	ENG	Mick Stockwell
8	MF	IRL	Matt Holland (captain)
9	FW	JAM	David Johnson
10	FW	ENG	James Scowcroft
11	MF	NIR	Jim Magilton

No.	Pos.	Nation	Player
12	FW	ENG	Richard Naylor
13	GK	ENG	Mike Salmon
14	MF	ENG	Jermaine Wright
15	MF	NED	Marco Holster
17	DF	ENG	Wayne Brown
24	DF	ENG	John McGreal
25	DF	ENG	Gary Croft
27	FW	ENG	Marcus Stewart
29	GK	IRL	Keith Branagan
30	MF	NED	Martijn Reuser (on loan from Ajax)
32	FW	SWE	Jonas Axeldal

=== Left club during season ===
Note: Flags indicate national team as defined under FIFA eligibility rules; some limited exceptions apply. Players may hold more than one non-FIFA nationality.

No.	Pos.	Nation	Player
16	MF	ENG	Adam Tanner (to Peterborough United)
19	FW	ENG	Neil Midgley (on loan to Kidderminster Harriers)
23	FW	NIR	Sean Friars (on loan to Portadown)

No.	Pos.	Nation	Player
28	DF	ENG	Michael Clegg (loan return to Manchester United)
31	GK	NED	Sieb Dijkstra (released)

=== Reserve squad ===
Note: Flags indicate national team as defined under FIFA eligibility rules; some limited exceptions apply. Players may hold more than one non-FIFA nationality.

No.	Pos.	Nation	Player
18	DF	ENG	Titus Bramble
20	FW	ENG	Richard Logan
21	MF	ENG	John Kennedy

No.	Pos.	Nation	Player
22	MF	SCO	Stuart Niven
26	GK	ENG	James Pullen
–	MF	FRA	Patrice Maurel (on loan from Toulouse)

== Pre-season ==
Ipswich traveled to Scandinavia for pre-season prior to the 1999–2000 season, playing friendlies against Swedish sides Gefle IF and GIF Sundsvall.

=== Legend ===
Win	Draw	Loss

Date	Opponent	Venue	Result	Attendance	Scorers
20 July 1999	St Albans City	A	3–0	Unknown	Friars, Naylor, Niven
22 July 1999	Gefle IF	A	3–2	Unknown	Stockwell, Scowcroft, Midgley
24 July 1999	GIF Sundsvall	A	1–1	Unknown	Johnson
27 July 1999	Peterborough United	A	1–0	Unknown	Johnson
31 July 1999	FC Twente	H	1–2	Unknown	Scowcroft

== Competitions ==
=== Football League First Division ===
==== League table ====
Pos	Team	Pld	W	D	L	GF	GA	GD	Pts	Qualification or relegation
1	Charlton Athletic (C, P)	46	27	10	9	79	45	+34	91	Promotion to the Premier League
2	Manchester City (P)	46	26	11	9	78	40	+38	89	Promotion to the Premier League
3	Ipswich Town (O, P)	46	25	12	9	71	42	+29	87	Qualification for the First Division play-offs
4	Barnsley	46	24	10	12	88	67	+21	82	Qualification for the First Division play-offs
5	Birmingham City	46	22	11	13	65	44	+21	77	Qualification for the First Division play-offs

Rules for classification: 1) Points; 2) Goal difference; 3) Goals scored
(C) Champions; (O) Play-off winners; (P) Promoted

==== Legend ====
Win	Draw	Loss

Ipswich Town's score comes first

==== Matches ====
Date	Opponent	Venue	Result	Attendance	Scorers
7 August 1999	Nottingham Forest	H	3-1	20,830	Naylor, Johnson, Scowcroft
15 August 1999	Swindon Town	A	4-1	6,195	Johnson (2), Naylor (2)
21 August 1999	Bolton Wanderers	H	1-0	17,696	Johnson
28 August 1999	Sheffield United	A	2-2	12,455	Scowcroft, Johnson
30 August 1999	Barnsley	H	6-1	18,037	Johnson (2), Venus, Naylor, Scowcroft, Magilton
11 September 1999	Portsmouth	A	1-1	16,034	Scowcroft
18 September 1999	Birmingham City	H	0-1	19,758	
26 September 1999	Manchester City	H	2-1	19,406	Johnson, Croft
2 October 1999	Grimsby Town	A	1-2	6,531	Magilton
16 October 1999	Queens Park Rangers	H	1-4	17,544	Holland
19 October 1999	Charlton Athletic	H	4-2	17,940	Scowcroft, Venus, Johnson, Stockwell
23 October 1999	Walsall	A	1-0	6,526	Naylor
27 October 1999	Manchester City	A	0-1	32,799	
30 October 1999	Grimsby Town	H	2-0	16,617	Clapham, Naylor
2 November 1999	Huddersfield Town	A	1-3	12,093	Holland
6 November 1999	Blackburn Rovers	A	2-2	18,512	Holland, Mowbray
12 November 1999	Tranmere Rovers	H	0-0	14,514	
21 November 1999	Norwich City	A	0-0	19,948	
24 November 1999	Wolverhampton Wanderers	H	1-0	15,731	Scowcroft
27 November 1999	Crewe Alexandra	H	2-1	15,211	Johnson (2)
5 December 1999	Nottingham Forest	A	1-0	15,724	Holland
7 December 1999	Crystal Palace	A	2-2	13,176	Holland, Johnson
18 December 1999	West Bromwich Albion	H	3-1	14,712	Johnson, Scowcroft, Midgley
26 December 1999	Fulham	A	0-0	17,255	
28 December 1999	Stockport County	H	1-0	20,671	Scowcroft
3 January 2000	Port Vale	A	2-1	6,908	Holland, Scowcroft
15 January 2000	Swindon Town	H	3-0	17,326	Stockwell, Naylor (2)
22 January 2000	Bolton Wanderers	A	1-1	11,924	Holland
29 January 2000	Sheffield United	H	1-1	17,350	Johnson (pen)
5 February 2000	Barnsley	A	2-0	17,601	Scowcroft, Stewart
12 February 2000	Huddersfield Town	H	2-1	21,233	Scowcroft, Stewart
19 February 2000	Crewe Alexandra	A	2-1	6,393	Clapham, Wright
27 February 2000	Birmingham City	A	1-1	20,493	Johnson
4 March 2000	Portsmouth	H	0-1	20,305	
7 March 2000	Blackburn Rovers	H	0-0	18,871	
11 March 2000	Wolverhampton Wanderers	A	1-2	22,652	Scowcroft
19 March 2000	Norwich City	H	0-2	21,760	
22 March 2000	Tranmere Rovers	A	2-0	6,933	Holland, Johnson
25 March 2000	Fulham	H	1-0	20,168	Reuser
4 April 2000	West Browich Albion	A	1-1	12,536	Holland
8 April 2000	Port Vale	H	3-0	19,663	Scowcroft, Johnson, Holland
15 April 2000	Stockport County	A	1-0	8,501	Johnson
22 April 2000	Queens Park Rangers	A	1-3	14,920	Magilton (pen)
25 April 2000	Crystal Palace	H	1-0	18,798	Johnson
29 April 2000	Charlton Athletic	A	3-1	20,043	Magilton, Johnson, Reuser
7 May 2000	Walsall	H	2-0	21,908	Johnson (2)

=== First Division play-offs ===
Round	Date	Opponent	Venue	Result	Attendance	Goalscorers
SF 1st Leg	14 May 2000	Bolton Wanderers	A	2-2	18,814	Stewart (2)
SF 2nd Leg	17 May 2000	Bolton Wanderers	H	5-3 (won 7–5 on agg)	21,543	Magilton (3), Clapham (pen), Reuser
Final	29 May 2000	Barnsley	Wembley Stadium	4-2	73,427	Mowbray, Naylor, Stewart, Reuser

=== FA Cup ===
Round	Date	Opponent	Venue	Result	Attendance	Goalscorers
R3	13 December 1999	Southampton	H	0-1	14,383	

=== League Cup ===
Round	Date	Opponent	Venue	Result	Attendance	Goalscorers
R1 1st Leg	11 August 1999	Brentford	A	2-0		Johnson, Clapham
R1 2nd Leg	24 August 1999	Brentford	H	2-0 (won 4–0 on agg)		Scowcroft, Clapham
R2 1st Leg	14 September 1999	Crewe Alexandra	A	1-2		Venus
R2 2nd Leg	21 September 1999	Crewe Alexandra	H	1-1 (lost 2–3 on agg)		Scowcroft

== Transfers ==
=== Transfers in ===
Date	Pos	Name	From	Fee	Ref
14 July 1999	GK	(England) Mike Salmon	(England) Charlton Athletic	Free transfer	
21 July 1999	MF	(England) Jermaine Wright	(England) Crewe Alexandra	£500,000	
5 August 1999	DF	(England) John McGreal	(England) Tranmere Rovers	£650,000	
23 August 1999	FW	(Sweden) Jonas Axeldal	(Italy) Calcio Foggia	Free transfer	
21 September 1999	DF	(England) Gary Croft	(England) Blackburn Rovers	£540,000	
29 September 1999	GK	(England) James Pullen	(England) Heybridge Swifts	Free transfer	
11 November 1999	GK	(Netherlands) Sieb Dijkstra	(Scotland) Dundee United	Free transfer	
1 February 2000	FW	(England) Marcus Stewart	(England) Huddersfield Town	£2,750,000	
22 March 2000	GK	(Republic of Ireland) Keith Branagan	(England) Bolton Wanderers	Free transfer	

=== Loans in ===
Date from	Pos	Name	From	Date until	Ref
8 February 2000	MF	(France) Patrice Maurel	(France) Toulouse	30 June 2000	
16 February 2000	DF	(England) Michael Clegg	(England) Manchester United	10 March 2000	
23 March 2000	MF	(Netherlands) Martijn Reuser	(Netherlands) Ajax	30 June 2000	

=== Transfers out ===
Date	Pos	Name	To	Fee	Ref
3 June 1999	DF	(England) David Theobald	(England) Brentford	Free transfer	
1 July 1999	GK	(England) Lee Bracey	(England) Hull City	Free transfer	
1 July 1999	DF	(England) Jason Cundy	(England) Portsmouth	Free transfer	
1 July 1999	MF	(Netherlands) Bobby Petta	(Scotland) Celtic	Free transfer	
14 July 1999	MF	(England) Kieron Dyer	(England) Newcastle United	£6,000,000	
16 November 1999	GK	(Netherlands) Sieb Dijkstra	Free agent	Released	
23 March 2000	MF	(England) Adam Tanner	(England) Peterborough United	Free transfer	
23 March 2000	MF	(England) Chris Keeble	(England) Colchester United	Free transfer	

=== Loans out ===
Date from	Pos	Name	From	Date until	Ref
23 September 1999	FW	(England) Neil Midgley	(England) Luton Town	23 November 1999	
30 December 1999	DF	(England) Titus Bramble	(England) Colchester United	30 January 2000	
18 March 2000	FW	(Northern Ireland) Sean Friars	(Northern Ireland) Portadown	18 May 2000	
30 March 2000	FW	(England) Neil Midgley	(England) Kidderminster Harriers	8 May 2000	

== Squad statistics ==
All statistics updated as of end of season

=== Appearances and goals ===
No.	Pos	Nat	Player	Total		First Division		FA Cup		League Cup		Play-offs	
No.	Pos	Nat	Player	Apps	Goals	Apps	Goals	Apps	Goals	Apps	Goals	Apps	Goals
Goalkeepers
1	GK	(England) ENG	Richard Wright	53	0	46	0	1	0	4	0	2	0
Defenders
2	DF	(Netherlands) NED	Fabian Wilnis	40	0	35	0	1	0	1+1	0	1+1	0
3	DF	(England) ENG	Jamie Clapham	54	5	46	2	1	0	4	2	3	1
4	DF	(France) FRA	Jean-Manuel Thetis	20	0	16	0	0	0	3	0	1	0
5	DF	(England) ENG	Tony Mowbray	40	2	36	1	0	0	1	0	3	1
6	DF	(England) ENG	Mark Venus	34	3	28	2	0	0	3	1	3	0
17	DF	(England) ENG	Wayne Brown	30	0	25	0	1	0	2	0	1+1	0
24	DF	(England) ENG	John McGreal	38	1	34	0	1	0	0	0	3	1
25	DF	(England) ENG	Gary Croft	24	1	21	1	0	0	0	0	2+1	0
28	DF	(England) ENG	Michael Clegg	3	0	3	0	0	0	0	0	0	0
Midfielders
7	MF	(England) ENG	Mick Stockwell	42	2	35	2	1	0	3+1	0	2	0
8	MF	(Republic of Ireland) IRL	Matt Holland	54	10	46	10	1	0	4	0	3	0
11	MF	(Northern Ireland) NIR	Jim Magilton	46	7	39	4	1	0	3	0	3	3
14	MF	(England) ENG	Jermaine Wright	39	1	34	1	0+1	0	3	0	1	0
30	MF	(Netherlands) NED	Martijn Reuser	11	4	2+6	2	0	0	0	0	0+3	2
Forwards
9	FW	(Jamaica) JAM	David Johnson	52	23	44	22	1	0	4	1	3	0
10	FW	(England) ENG	James Scowcroft	50	15	43	13	1	0	4	2	2	0
12	FW	(England) ENG	Richard Naylor	43	9	36	8	0+1	0	3+1	0	0+2	1
19	FW	(England) ENG	Neil Midgley	4	1	4	1	0	0	0	0	0	0
20	FW	(England) ENG	Richard Logan	1	0	0+1	0	0	0	0	0	0	0
23	FW	(Northern Ireland) NIR	Sean Friars	1	0	0+1	0	0	0	0	0	0	0
27	FW	(England) ENG	Marcus Stewart	13	5	9+1	2	0	0	0	0	3	3
32	FW	(Sweden) SWE	Jonas Axeldal	20	0	1+15	0	0+1	0	0+3	0	0	0

Last updated: end of season
Source: Competitions

=== Goalscorers ===
No.	Pos	Nat	Player	First Division	FA Cup	League Cup	Play-offs	Total
9	FW	(Jamaica)	David Johnson	22	0	1	0	23
10	FW	(England)	James Scowcroft	13	0	2	0	15
8	MF	(Republic of Ireland)	Matt Holland	10	0	0	0	10
12	FW	(England)	Richard Naylor	8	0	0	1	9
11	MF	(Northern Ireland)	Jim Magilton	4	0	0	3	7
3	DF	(England)	Jamie Clapham	2	0	2	1	5
27	FW	(England)	Marcus Stewart	2	0	0	3	5
30	MF	(Netherlands)	Martijn Reuser	2	0	0	2	4
6	DF	(England)	Mark Venus	2	0	1	0	3
5	DF	(England)	Tony Mowbray	1	0	0	1	2
7	MF	(England)	Mick Stockwell	2	0	0	0	2
14	MF	(England)	Jermaine Wright	1	0	0	0	1
19	FW	(England)	Neil Midgely	1	0	0	0	1
24	DF	(England)	John McGreal	0	0	0	1	1
25	DF	(England)	Gary Croft	1	0	0	0	1
Total				71	0	6	12	89

=== Clean sheets ===
No.	Nat	Player	First Division	FA Cup	League Cup	Play-offs	Total
1	(England)	Richard Wright	18	0	2	0	20
Total			18	0	2	0	20

=== Disciplinary record ===
No.	Pos	Nat	Player	First Division		FA Cup		League Cup		Play-offs		Total	
No.	Pos	Nat	Player	Booked	Sent off (straight red)	Booked	Sent off (straight red)	Booked	Sent off (straight red)	Booked	Sent off (straight red)	Booked	Sent off (straight red)
2	DF	(Netherlands)	Fabian Wilnis	7	0	0	0	0	0	0	0	7	0
3	DF	(England)	Jamie Clapham	2	0	0	0	0	0	0	0	2	0
4	DF	(France)	Jean-Manuel Thetis	5	1	0	0	0	0	0	0	5	1
5	DF	(England)	Tony Mowbray	5	0	0	0	0	0	0	0	5	0
6	DF	(England)	Mark Venus	8	0	0	0	0	0	1	0	9	0
9	FW	(Jamaica)	David Johnson	6	0	0	0	0	0	0	0	6	0
10	FW	(England)	James Scowcroft	2	0	0	0	0	0	0	0	2	0
11	MF	(Northern Ireland)	Jim Magilton	2	1	0	0	1	0	0	0	3	1
12	FW	(England)	Richard Naylor	3	0	0	0	0	0	1	0	4	0
14	MF	(England)	Jermaine Wright	2	0	0	0	0	0	0	0	2	0
17	DF	(England)	Wayne Brown	1	0	0	0	0	0	0	0	1	0
24	DF	(England)	John McGreal	4	1	0	0	0	0	0	0	4	1
25	DF	(England)	Gary Croft	2	0	0	0	0	0	0	0	2	0
28	DF	(England)	Michael Clegg	1	0	0	0	0	0	0	0	1	0
Total				50	3	0	0	1	0	2	0	53	3

== Awards ==
=== Player awards ===
Award	Player	Ref
Player of the Year	(England) James Scowcroft	

=== PFA First Division Team of the Year ===
Player	Ref
(England) Richard Wright	
(England) Marcus Stewart	
