= 1998–99 Ipswich Town F.C. season =

Ipswich Town
1998–99 season
- Chairman: David Sheepshanks
- Manager: George Burley
- Stadium: Portman Road
- First Division: 3rd
- FA Cup: Fourth round
- League Cup: Second round
- Play-offs: Semi-finals
- Top goalscorer: League: David Johnson / James Scowcroft (13); All: David Johnson / James Scowcroft (14)
- Highest home attendance: 22,162 (vs Queens Park Rangers, 5 Apr 1999, First Division)
- Lowest home attendance: 7,952 (vs Exeter City, 18 Aug 1998, League Cup)
- Average home league attendance: 16,920

During the 1998–99 English football season, Ipswich Town competed in the Football League First Division.

== Season summary ==
In the 1998–99 season, Ipswich fans felt it would be third time lucky in the play-offs for the Tractor Boys. However the team once again lost on away goals to Bolton Wanderers. Ipswich had been second at the beginning of April but defeat to Bolton saw Bradford City overtake them and two more defeats in their last four games, including a shock home defeat to relegation-threatened Crewe Alexandra, saw Ipswich finish third.

== First-team squad ==
Note: Flags indicate national team as defined under FIFA eligibility rules; some limited exceptions apply. Players may hold more than one non-FIFA nationality.

No.	Pos.	Nation	Player
—	GK	(England) ENG	Richard Wright
—	GK	(England) ENG	Lee Bracey
—	DF	(England) ENG	Jason Cundy
—	DF	(England) ENG	Tony Mowbray
—	DF	(England) ENG	Mark Venus
—	DF	(France) FRA	Jean-Manuel Thetis
—	DF	(Netherlands) NED	Fabian Wilnis
—	MF	(England) ENG	Jamie Clapham
—	MF	(England) ENG	Kieron Dyer
—	MF	(England) ENG	John Kennedy

No.	Pos.	Nation	Player
—	MF	(England) ENG	Mick Stockwell
—	MF	(England) ENG	Adam Tanner
—	MF	(Northern Ireland) NIR	Jim Magilton
—	MF	(England) ENG	Matt Holland (captain)
—	MF	(Netherlands) NED	Marco Holster
—	MF	(Netherlands) NED	Bobby Petta
—	FW	(England) ENG	Richard Naylor
—	FW	(England) ENG	James Scowcroft
—	FW	(Jamaica) JAM	David Johnson

=== Left club during season ===
Note: Flags indicate national team as defined under FIFA eligibility rules; some limited exceptions apply. Players may hold more than one non-FIFA nationality.

No.	Pos.	Nation	Player
—	DF	(Argentina) ARG	Mauricio Taricco (to Tottenham Hotspur)
—	MF	(Northern Ireland) NIR	Danny Sonner (to Sheffield Wednesday)
—	MF	(England) ENG	Paolo Vernazza (loan return to Arsenal)
—	MF	(England) ENG	Lee Hodges (loan return to West Ham United)
—	MF	(England) ENG	Jonathan Hunt (loan return to Derby County)

No.	Pos.	Nation	Player
—	MF	(England) ENG	Paul Mason (Retired)
—	FW	(Scotland) SCO	Alex Mathie (to Dundee United)
—	FW	(France) FRA	Samassi Abou (loan return to West Ham United)
—	FW	(England) ENG	Marlon Harewood (loan return to Nottingham Forest)

=== Reserve squad ===
Note: Flags indicate national team as defined under FIFA eligibility rules; some limited exceptions apply. Players may hold more than one non-FIFA nationality.

No.	Pos.	Nation	Player
—	DF	(England) ENG	Wayne Brown
—	DF	(England) ENG	Titus Bramble
—	MF	(Scotland) SCO	Stuart Niven

No.	Pos.	Nation	Player
—	MF	(England) ENG	Chris Keeble
—	FW	(England) ENG	Richard Logan

== Competitions ==
=== Football League First Division ===
==== League table ====
Pos	Team	Pld	W	D	L	GF	GA	GD	Pts	Qualification or relegation
1	Sunderland (C, P)	46	31	12	3	91	28	+63	105	Promotion to the Premier League
2	Bradford City (P)	46	26	9	11	82	47	+35	87	Promotion to the Premier League
3	Ipswich Town	46	26	8	12	69	32	+37	86	Qualification for the First Division play-offs
4	Birmingham City	46	23	12	11	66	37	+29	81	Qualification for the First Division play-offs
5	Watford (O, P)	46	21	14	11	65	56	+9	77	Qualification for the First Division play-offs

Rules for classification: 1) Points; 2) Goals scored; 3) Goal difference
(C) Champions; (O) Play-off winners; (P) Promoted

==== Legend ====
Win	Draw	Loss

Ipswich Town's score comes first

==== Matches ====
Date	Opponent	Venue	Result	Attendance	Scorers
9 August 1998	Grimsby Town	A	0–0	7,211	
15 August 1998	Bury	H	0–0	13,267	
22 August 1998	Portsmouth	A	0–0	12,002	
29 August 1998	Sunderland	H	0–2	15,813	
31 August 1998	Port Vale	A	3–0	5,485	Scowcroft, Johnson, Holland
8 September 1998	Bradford City	H	3–0	11,596	Scowcroft (2), Venus
12 September 1998	Oxford United	A	3–3	6,632	Scowcroft, Johnson, Dyer
19 September 1998	Bristol City	H	3–1	13,657	Johnson (2), Scowcroft
26 September 1998	Watford	A	0–1	13,109	
29 September 1998	Tranmere Rovers	A	2–0	5,072	Stockwell, Scowcroft
3 October 1998	Crystal Palace	H	3–0	16,837	Venus (pen), Taricco, Mathie
17 October 1998	Swindon Town	H	1–0	13,212	Johnson
20 October 1998	Norwich City	H	0–1	22,079	
24 October 1998	Stockport County	A	1–0	7,432	Dyer
31 October 1998	West Bromwich Albion	H	2–0	15,568	Johnson (2)
3 November 1998	Wolverhampton Wanderers	H	2–0	14,680	Scowcroft, Stockwell
7 November 1998	Huddersfield Town	A	2–2	14,240	Venus, Johnson
14 November 1998	Barnsley	A	1–0	15,966	Johnson
21 November 1998	Bolton Wanderers	H	0–1	17,255	
28 November 1998	Crewe Alexandra	A	3–0	5,165	Scowcroft (3, 1 pen)
2 December 1998	Queens Park Rangers	A	1–1	12,449	Holland
5 December 1998	Birmingham City	H	1–0	15,901	Petta
12 December 1998	Barnsley	H	0–2	16,021	
20 December 1998	Sheffield United	A	2–1	12,944	Abou, Naylor
26 December 1998	Portsmouth	H	3–0	21,805	Naylor (2), Dyer
28 December 1998	Wolverhampton Wanderers	A	0–1	24,636	
9 January 1999	Grimsby Town	H	0–1	15,575	
17 January 1999	Sunderland	A	1–2	39,835	Holland
30 January 1999	Port Vale	H	1–0	16,328	Clapham
6 February 1999	Bury	A	3–0	4,750	Venus (pen), Mowbray, Harewood
13 February 1999	Bradford City	A	0–0	15,024	
20 February 1999	Oxford United	H	2–1	16,920	Holland, Venus (pen)
27 February 1999	Bristol City	A	1–0	14,065	Naylor
2 March 1999	Watford	H	3–2	18,818	Dyer, Venus, Johnson
6 March 1999	Tranmere Rovers	H	1–0	15,929	Thetis
9 March 1999	Crystal Palace	A	2–3	16,360	Johnson, Clapham
13 March 1999	Huddersfield Town	H	3–0	17,170	Magilton, Johnson, Petta
20 March 1999	West Bromwich Albion	A	1–0	15,552	Thetis
3 April 1999	Swindon Town	A	6–0	10,337	Venus (2 pens), Scowcroft, Mowbray, Clapham, Wilnis
5 April 1999	Queens Park Rangers	H	3–1	22,162	Johnson, Scowcroft, Holland
11 April 1999	Norwich City	A	0–0	19,511	
17 April 1999	Bolton Wanderers	A	0–2	19,894	
20 April 1999	Stockport County	H	1–0	17,056	Magilton
24 April 1999	Crewe Alexandra	H	1–2	20,845	Venus (pen)
2 May 1999	Birmingham City	A	0–1	27,685	
9 May 1999	Sheffield United	H	4–1	21,689	Magilton, Scowcroft, Dyer, Naylor

=== First Division play-offs ===
Round	Date	Opponent	Venue	Result	Attendance	Goalscorers
SF 1st Leg	16 May 1999	Bolton Wanderers	A	0–1	18,295	
SF 2nd Leg	19 May 1999	Bolton Wanderers	H	4–3 (lost on away goals)	21,755	Holland (2), Dyer (2)

=== FA Cup ===
Round	Date	Opponent	Venue	Result	Attendance	Goalscorers
R3	2 January 1999	Tranmere Rovers	A	1–0	7,223	McGreal (own goal)
R4	23 January 1999	Everton	A	0–1	28,854	

=== League Cup ===
Round	Date	Opponent	Venue	Result	Attendance	Goalscorers
R1 1st Leg	11 August 1998	Exeter City	A	1–1	3,233	Holland
R1 2nd Leg	18 August 1998	Exeter City	H	5–1 (won 6–2 on agg)	7,952	Taricco, Holland, Stockwell, Mathie, Mason
R2 1st Leg	15 September 1998	Luton Town	H	2–1	9,032	Scowcroft, Thetis
R2 2nd Leg	22 September 1998	Luton Town	A	2–4 (lost 4–5 on agg)	5,655	Johnson, Davis (own goal)

== Transfers ==
=== Transfers in ===
Date	Pos	Name	From	Fee	Ref
1 July 1998	MF	(Netherlands) Marco Holster	(Netherlands) Heracles Almelo	Free transfer	
1 August 1998	FW	(Northern Ireland) Sean Friars	(England) Liverpool	Free transfer	
11 September 1998	DF	(France) Jean-Manuel Thetis	(Spain) Sevilla	£50,000	
6 January 1999	DF	(Netherlands) Fabian Wilnis	(Netherlands) De Graafschap	£200,000	
22 March 1999	MF	(Northern Ireland) Jim Magilton	(England) Sheffield Wednesday	£680,000	

=== Loans in ===
Date from	Pos	Name	From	Date until	Ref
3 October 1998	MF	(England) Paolo Vernazza	(England) Arsenal	3 November 1998	
28 October 1998	MF	(England) Jonathan Hunt	(England) Derby County	17 November 1998	
18 November 1998	MF	(England) Lee Hodges	(England) West Ham United	21 December 1998	
3 December 1998	FW	(France) Samassi Abou	(England) West Ham United	29 December 1998	
12 January 1999	MF	(Northern Ireland) Jim Magilton	(England) Sheffield Wednesday	21 March 1999	
28 January 1999	FW	(England) Marlon Harewood	(England) Nottingham Forest	4 March 1999	

=== Transfers out ===
Date	Pos	Name	To	Fee	Ref
1 July 1998	MF	(England) Simon Milton	Retired		
7 July 1998	MF	(Wales) Geraint Williams	(England) Colchester United	Undisclosed	
7 July 1998	DF	(Netherlands) Gus Uhlenbeek	(England) Fulham	Free transfer	
29 September 1998	MF	(England) Paul Mason	Retired		
14 October 1998	MF	(Northern Ireland) Danny Sonner	(England) Sheffield Wednesday	Undisclosed	
16 October 1998	FW	(Scotland) Alex Mathie	(Scotland) Dundee United	£700,000	
9 November 1998	DF	(Argentina) Mauricio Taricco	(England) Tottenham Hotspur	£1,775,000	

=== Loans out ===
Date from	Pos	Name	From	Date until	Ref
1 August 1998	MF	(England) John Kennedy	(England) Morecambe	31 October 1998	

== Awards ==
=== Player awards ===
Award	Player	Ref
Player of the Year	(England) Jamie Clapham	

=== PFA First Division Team of the Year ===
Player	Ref
(England) Richard Wright	
(England) Mark Venus	
(England) Kieron Dyer	
