= 2016–17 Championnat de France Amateur =

Championnat de France Amateur
- Season: 2016–17
- Champions: Grenoble
- Promoted: Cholet; Entente SSG; Grenoble; Rodez
- Relegated: (10 teams - see "Season outcomes" section)
- Top goalscorer: Patrick Etshini Kindenge, Entente SSG; 20 goals
- Biggest home win: 8–0 Monaco (res) v Nice (res); Group D, R14, 14 December 2016
- Biggest away win: 1–8 Calais RUFC v Entente SSG; Group B, R8, 15 October 2016
- Highest scoring: 9 goals Calais RUFC 1–8 Entente SSG; Group B, R8, 15 October 2016; Toulon 4–5 Nice (res); Group D, R23, 18 March 2017
- All statistics correct as of 19:40, 20 May 2017 (UTC).

The 2016–17 Championnat de France Amateur was the 19th season of the fourth tier in the French football league system in its current format. The competition was contested by 64 clubs split geographically across 4 groups of 16 teams each. The teams included amateur clubs (although a few are semi-professional) and the reserve teams of professional clubs.

== Teams ==
On July 15, the FFF ratified the constitution of the competition, and published the groups as follows:

- 47 clubs who were neither relegated or promoted from the 2015–16 Championnat de France amateur groups.
- 1 team administratively relegated from 2015–16 Ligue 2 (Évian TG)
- 1 team relegated from 2015–16 Championnat National (Fréjus Saint-Raphaël).
- 12 teams promoted from 2015–16 Championnat de France Amateur 2. (Rennes reserves, Chartres, ES Paulhan-Pézenas, Andrézieux, Reims reserves, Lille reserves, Le Havre, Annecy, Saint-Maur, Montpellier reserves, Raon-l'Étape and Granville).
- 2 teams reprieved from relegation from 2015–16 Championnat de France Amateur (Rodez and Vitré)
- Sporting Club Toulon, formed from a merger of Toulon-Le Las and Toulon, and taking the former's place in the league.

On 9 August, the FFF confirmed the decision by Évian TG not to participate in the CFA following the club's recent receivership. Because the decision comes after 15 July, there will be no replacement and Group C will instead operate with 15 clubs.

== League tables ==
Group A
Pos	Team	Pld	W	D	L	GF	GA	GD	Pts	Promotion or relegation
1	Rennes (res) (C)	30	16	8	6	44	34	+10	56	
2	Cholet (Note: Cholet were penalised by the FFF for a technical infringement on submission of the teamsheet in the Round 2 game away at Châteaubriant on 20 August 2016. The original scoreline was 1–2 in favour of Cholet. The match was awarded to Châteaubriant 3–0 and Cholet were deducted a point. Cholet appealed, but currently the decision stands.) (P)	30	14	10	6	46	32	+14	51	Promotion to National
3	Bergerac (Note: Bergerac were penalised by the FFF for fielding two suspended players in the Round 22 game away at Cholet on 11 March 2017. The original scoreline was 0–0. The match was awarded to Cholet 3–0 and Bergerac were deducted a point.)	30	14	7	9	35	34	+1	48	
4	Granville	30	13	8	9	40	41	−1	47	
5	Trélissac	30	13	7	10	44	31	+13	46	
6	Vitré	30	12	9	9	36	34	+2	45	
7	Romorantin	30	12	8	10	35	31	+4	44	
8	Fontenay	30	11	9	10	47	49	−2	42	
9	Saint-Malo	30	11	9	10	32	32	0	42	
10	Paris Saint-Germain (res)	30	12	6	12	44	36	+8	42	
11	Lorient (res)	30	10	9	11	41	35	+6	39	
12	Chartres	30	7	12	11	33	41	−8	33	
13	Mantes	30	7	8	15	23	41	−18	29	
14	Plabennec (R)	30	6	11	13	30	37	−7	29	Relegation to National 3
15	Nantes (res) (R)	30	5	13	12	40	40	0	28	Relegation to National 3
16	Châteaubriant (R)	30	6	8	16	26	48	−22	26	Relegation to National 3

Source: FFF.fr
Rules for classification: 1) points; 2) head-to-head results; 3) head-to-head goal difference; 4) goal difference; 5) number of goals scored; 6) fair play points; 7) draw
(C) Champions; (P) Promoted; (R) Relegated
Notes:

Group B
Pos	Team	Pld	W	D	L	GF	GA	GD	Pts	Promotion or relegation
1	Entente SSG (C, P)	30	16	10	4	52	20	+32	58	Promotion to National
2	Fleury	30	17	6	7	36	22	+14	57	
3	Saint-Maur	30	14	12	4	36	20	+16	54	
4	Boulogne-Billancourt	30	15	4	11	48	42	+6	49	
5	Arras FA	30	13	7	10	47	34	+13	46	
6	Lens (res)	30	13	5	12	36	37	−1	44	
7	Drancy	30	9	12	9	28	22	+6	39	
8	Lille (res)	30	9	11	10	36	38	−2	38	
9	Croix (Note: On 10 September 2016, the game between Croix and Calais RUFC was abandoned by the referee after the assistant referee was squirted with a water bottle. On 18 November 2016, the DCNG penalised Croix by deducting a point and awarded the game to Calais RUFC by the score 3–0.)	30	10	8	12	34	36	−2	37	
10	Le Havre (res)	30	10	6	14	36	43	−7	36	
11	Viry-Châtillon (Note: Viry-Châtillon were deducted two points by the DNCG on 13 December 2016.)	30	8	12	10	37	40	−3	34	
12	AC Amiens	30	9	6	15	30	40	−10	33	
13	Poissy	30	8	8	14	37	44	−7	32	
14	Wasquehal (R)	30	6	11	13	23	36	−13	29	Relegation to National 3
15	Dieppe (R)	30	6	10	14	21	47	−26	28	Relegation to National 3
16	Calais RUFC (Note: On 17 January 2017 Calais RUFC were deducted 6 points by the Direction Nationale de Contrôle de Gestion (DNCG) for breach of financial rules. The club appealed, but the ban was upheld. Calais were deducted a further point by the FFF on 8 March 2017 for not having an appropriately qualified coach.) (R)	30	7	12	11	41	57	−16	26	Relegation to Régional 1

Source: FFF.fr
Rules for classification: 1) points; 2) head-to-head results; 3) head-to-head goal difference; 4) goal difference; 5) number of goals scored; 6) fair play points; 7) draw
(C) Champions; (P) Promoted; (R) Relegated
Notes:

Group C
Pos	Team	Pld	W	D	L	GF	GA	GD	Pts	Promotion or relegation
1	Grenoble (C, P)	28	20	6	2	47	15	+32	66	Promotion to National
2	Le Puy	28	16	9	3	40	15	+25	57	
3	Annecy	28	15	5	8	50	32	+18	50	
4	Lyon (res)	28	13	7	8	54	44	+10	46	
5	Jura Sud	28	12	8	8	44	38	+6	44	
6	Villefranche	28	11	7	10	34	34	0	40	
7	Reims (res)	28	8	12	8	43	41	+2	36	
8	Andrézieux	28	9	6	13	37	44	−7	33	
9	Raon-l'Étape	28	8	8	12	37	49	−12	32	
10	Chasselay MDA	28	8	7	13	29	37	−8	31	
11	Yzeure	28	6	11	11	28	38	−10	29	
12	St-Louis Neuweg (Note: On 3 January 2017 St-Louis Neuweg were deducted 3 points by the Direction Nationale de Contrôle de Gestion (DNCG) for breach of financial rules. The club appealed, but the ban was upheld.)	28	8	7	13	30	44	−14	28	
13	Montceau	28	7	7	14	35	48	−13	28	
14	Auxerre (res) (R)	28	6	7	15	35	51	−16	25	Relegation to National 3
15	Mulhouse (Note: On 17 January 2017 Mulhouse were deducted 4 points by the Direction Nationale de Contrôle de Gestion (DNCG) for breach of financial rules. The club appealed, but the ban was upheld.) (R)	28	7	5	16	30	43	−13	22	Relegation to National 3
16	Evian Thonon Gaillard	0	0	0	0	0	0	0	0	Folded as a team, Refounded as Thonon Evian Savoie

Source: FFF.fr
Rules for classification: 1) points; 2) head-to-head results; 3) head-to-head goal difference; 4) goal difference; 5) number of goals scored; 6) fair play points; 7) draw
(C) Champions; (P) Promoted; (R) Relegated
Notes:

Group D
Pos	Team	Pld	W	D	L	GF	GA	GD	Pts	Promotion or relegation
1	Rodez (C, P)	30	18	7	5	43	27	+16	61	Promotion to National
2	Mont de Marsan	30	14	9	7	46	28	+18	51	
3	Fréjus Saint-Raphaël	30	15	6	9	46	31	+15	51	
4	Toulon	30	12	8	10	42	33	+9	44	
5	Colomiers	30	11	10	9	35	37	−2	43	
6	Hyères	30	10	13	7	32	22	+10	43	
7	Monaco (res)	30	12	6	12	54	48	+6	42	
8	Marignane-Gignac	30	10	10	10	47	45	+2	40	
9	Tarbes	30	9	12	9	32	32	0	39	
10	Marseille (res)	30	10	8	12	30	32	−2	38	
11	Martigues	30	10	8	12	33	40	−7	38	
12	Nice (res)	30	8	11	11	37	50	−13	35	
13	Sète	30	8	11	11	26	28	−2	35	
14	Paulhan-Pézenas	30	8	9	13	34	45	−11	33	
15	Montpellier (res) (R)	30	8	7	15	26	45	−19	31	Relegation to National 3
16	Le Pontet (R)	30	5	9	16	25	45	−20	24	Relegation to National 3

Source: FFF.fr
Rules for classification: 1) points; 2) head-to-head results; 3) head-to-head goal difference; 4) goal difference; 5) number of goals scored; 6) fair play points; 7) draw
(C) Champions; (P) Promoted; (R) Relegated

== Season outcomes ==
Outcomes below are provisional and subject to ratification by the FFF.

=== Champions and promotions ===
Cholet, Entente SSG, Grenoble and Rodez are promoted to National. Although Rennes (res) finished at the top of Group A, reserve sides are not eligible for promotion.

Grenoble are Champions of 2016–17 Championnat de France Amateur, due to having the best record of the four group winning sides against the teams finishing in 2nd to 6th in their respective groups.

=== Relegation ===
Plabennec, Nantes (res), Châteaubriant, Wasquehal, Dieppe, Calais RUFC, Auxerre (res), Mulhouse, Paulhan-Pézenas, Le Pontet and Montpellier (res) are provisionally relegated to National 3, subject to reprieves.

Calais RUFC were subsequently given an administrative relegation by the FFF, and as a consequence will play in the top level of regional football in 2017–18.

=== Reprieves ===
On 30 May the FFF announced that Furiani-Agliani were to be denied promotion from 2016–17 Championnat de France Amateur 2. This decision was overturned on appeal.

On 7 June the FFF announced that AS Saint-Ouen-l'Aumône were to be denied promotion from 2016–17 Championnat de France Amateur 2, and as a result Paulhan-Pézenas would be reprieved. This decision was ratified on appeal.

If any other administrative events lead to teams from outside the relegation places being relegated, already relegated teams will be reprieved in the following order:

==== Best 14th placed teams ====
Based on record against the teams finishing in 9th to 13th place in their respective groups.

Pos	Team	Pld	Pts	GD	
1	Paulhan-Pézenas	10	14	1	Reprieved
2	Plabennec	10	10	-2	
3	Wasquehal	10	9	-5	
4	Auxerre (res)	10	7	-6	Ineligible

==== Best 15th placed teams ====
Based on record against the teams finishing in 10th to 14th place in their respective groups.

Pos	Team	Pld	Pts	GD	
1	Mulhouse	10	14	4	Ineligible
2	Dieppe	10	13	-6	
3	Montpellier (res)	10	8	-7	
4	Nantes (res)	10	7	-3	

== Top scorers ==
As of end of season

Rank	Player	Club	Goals
1	Patrick Etshini Kindenge	L'Entente SSG	20
2	Edwin Maanane	Grenoble	19
3	Sébastien Bernard	Arras FA	16
4	Alan Dzabana	Lyon (res)	15
4	Mohamed Chalali	Boulogne-Billancourt	15
4	Yannis Dogo	Granville	15
7	Sébastien Persico	Romorantin	14
7	Anthony Petrilli	Trélissac	14
7	Fahd El Khoumisti	Fontenay	14
7	Irvin Cardona	Monaco (res)	14
