= 2019–20 Coupe de France preliminary rounds, Occitanie =

The 2019–20 Coupe de France preliminary rounds, Occitanie was the qualifying competition to decide which teams from the leagues of the Occitanie region of France took part in the main competition from the seventh round.

A total of eleven teams qualified from the Occitanie preliminary rounds. In 2018–19, FC Sète 34 progressed furthest in the main competition, reaching the round of 32 before losing to Lille OSC.

== Schedule ==
The first two rounds of the qualifying competition took place on the weekends of 25 August and 1 September 2019. A total of 460 teams were involved in the first two rounds, with 104 teams awarded byes to round two. Both the first and second rounds were arranged entirely within each district of the region.

The third round draw was made on 4 September 2019. The 11 Championnat National 3 (tier 5) sides entered at this stage.

The fourth round draw was made on 19 September 2019. The two sides from Championnat National 2 (tier 4) entered at this stage, and 39 ties were drawn.

The fifth round draw was made on 3 October 2019. The single side from Championnat National (tier 3) entered at this stage, and 20 ties were drawn.

The sixth round draw was made on 17 October 2019. Ten ties were drawn.

=== First round ===
These matches are from the Ariège district, and were played on 23, 24 and 25 August 2019.

First round results: Occitanie (Ariège)
Tie no	Home team (tier)	Score	Away team (tier)
1.	FC Pamiers (8)	1–2	FC St Girons (8)
2.	ES Fossatoise (8)	3–0	FC Saverdun (8)
3.	AS Rieux-de-Pelleport (9)	1–0	US Montaut (10)
4.	AS Plantaurel (11)	0–8	Tarascon FC (9)
5.	FC Coussa-Hers (9)	0–3	FC Pays d'Olmes (9)
6.	Vernajoul AC (10)	4–2 (a.e.t.)	FC Mirepoix (9)
7.	FC Laroque d'Olmes (9)	6–4 (a.e.t.)	EF St Paul avec Mercus (12)
8.	EN Mazères (9)	1–2	ES St Jean-du-Falga (9)

These matches are from the Aude district, and were played on 23, 24 and 25 August 2019.

First round results: Occitanie (Aude)
Tie no	Home team (tier)	Score	Away team (tier)
1.	Olympique Moussan-Montredon (9)	1–2 (a.e.t.)	FC Chalabre (10)
2.	AS Pexiora (9)	0–2	EC Coursan (10)
3.	FC Corbières Méditerranée (9)	3–3 (2–3 p)	USA Pezens (8)
4.	UFC Narbonne (9)	3–1	FC Malepère (10)
5.	US Villasavary (11)	1–2	ES Ste Eulalie-Villesèquelande (8)
6.	Razès Olympique (9)	0–1	Olympic Cuxac-d'Aude (10)
7.	Trapel-Pennautier FC (10)	0–3	AS Ventenac (10)
8.	Entente Naurouze-Labastide (9)	2–0	AS Bram (10)
9.	ASC des Îles (11)	2–3	FC Caux-et-Sauzens (10)
10.	FC St Nazairois (11)	3–1	Limoux-Pieusse FC (9)
11.	FC Villedubert (10)	1–4	Haut-Minervois Olympique (9)
12.	US Minervois (9)	7–1	FC Villegly (10)

These matches are from the Aveyron district, and were played on 23, 24 and 25 August 2019.

First round results: Occitanie (Aveyron)
Tie no	Home team (tier)	Score	Away team (tier)
1.	FC Agen-Gages (10)	5–1	AS Moyrazès (12)
2.	AS Cantoin (14)	0–3 (Note: Tie won by means of forfeit.)	AS Olemps (8)
3.	Stade Villefranchois (9)	0–1	FC Monastère (8)
4.	Entente Villecomtal-Mouret-Pruines-Entraygues (11)	1–5	AS Aguessac (9)
5.	US Bas Rouergue (9)	3–0	Foot Vallon (10)
6.	Foot Rouergue (11)	0–2	FC Villeneuvois/Diège (9)
7.	SC Sébazac (9)	3–2	Entente Campuac-Golinhac-Espeyrac (10)
8.	Union Haut Lévézou (11)	1–3	JS Bassin Aveyron (8)
9.	JS Lévézou (10)	4–3 (a.e.t.)	AS Vabraise (10)
10.	Pareloup Céor FC (12)	1–2	Olympique Martiel (14)
11.	SO Millau (9)	9–0	US Montbazens (10)
12.	Association St Laurentaise Cantonale Canourguaise (10)	0–5	US Argence/Viadène (10)
13.	US Pays Alzuréen (9)	3–1	AS St Geniez-d'Olt (11)
14.	AO Bozouls (10)	0–0 (6–5 p)	Entente Costecalde Lestrade Broquiès (11)
15.	FC Lioujas (11)	1–3	US Pays Rignacoise (9)
16.	US Réquistanaise (9)	1–2	Entente St Georges/St Rome (8)
17.	FC St Juéry (12)	2–3	Entente Salles Curan/Curan (9)

These matches are from the Gard-Lozère district, and were played on 23, 24 and 25 August 2019.

First round results: Occitanie (Gard-Lozère)
Tie no	Home team (tier)	Score	Away team (tier)
1.	SC Nîmois (11)	4–7	ES Grau-du-Roi (9)
2.	SA Cigalois (11)	3–0	AS Badaroux (11)
3.	AS Sommières (11)	1–6	FC Cévennes (10)
4.	FC Val de Cèze (9)	6–2	Foot Sud Lozère (10)
5.	EFC Beaucairois (11)	3–5	ESC Vézénobres (10)
6.	AS Le Malzieu (12)	0–10	JS Chemin Bas d'Avignon (8)
7.	Olympique Minier Pontil-Pradel (12)	0–6	FC Moussac (11)
8.	Olympique Fourquésien (11)	3–2	Olympique St Ambroisien (11)
9.	SC Cailaren (12)	0–3	AS Poulx (9)
10.	FC Vauverdois (8)	3–0 (Note: Tie won by means of forfeit.)	FC Pays Viganais Aigoual (11)
11.	ES Marguerittes (10)	13–0	Marvejols Sports (10)
12.	ASC Chanacoise (13)	2–6	ES Suménoise (9)
13.	AS Cendras (11)	0–10	US Monoblet (9)
14.	Gévaudan FC (13)	1–4	AS Caissargues (10)
15.	JSO Aubord (11)	6–2	Entente Chirac-Le Monastier (12)
16.	Omnisports St Hilaire-La Jasse (11)	3–0	Vaillante Aumonaise (11)
17.	AS Randonnaise (12)	0–11	RC Générac (9)
18.	OC Redessan (9)	3–1 (Note: Tie reversed with agreement of both clubs.)	AS St Christol-lès-Alès (10)
19.	Valdonnez FC (11)	1–2	FC Pont-St-Esprit (10)
20.	ESC Le Buisson (10)	1–1 (1–4 p)	AS St Privat-des-Vieux (9)
21.	Stade Ste Barbe (10)	2–2 (3–5 p)	ES Trois Moulins' (9)
22.	AS Nîmes Camarguais Croix de Fer (12)	1–2	AS St Paulet (10)
23.	FC Langlade (10)	3–6 (Note: GC Gallician penalised for fielding a suspended player. FC Langlade qualify.)	GC Gallician (10)
24.	Olympique de Gaujac (12)	3–4	US Garons (11)
25.	CA Bessegeoise (10)	3–0	FC Grandrieu-Rocles (11)
26.	AS Nîmes Athletic (9)	6–1	FC Rodilhan (12)
27.	US Peyrolaise (11)	3–0	FC St Jeannais (11)
28.	FC La Calmette (11)	1–0	SC Uzes (11)
29.	GS Gardois (9)	3–0	ES Rimeize (12)
30.	SC Manduellois (10)	0–2	ES Aigues-Vives/Aubais (10)

These matches are from the Haute-Garonne district, and were played on 23, 24, 25 and 28 August 2019.

First round results: Occitanie (Haute-Garonne)
Tie no	Home team (tier)	Score	Away team (tier)
1.	Toulouse Olympique Aviation Club (9)	5–1	Montastruc-de-Salies FC (10)
2.	AS Villeneuve Lécussan (11)	1–6	Pucho United (12)
3.	FC Autan (13)	2–5	Grenade FC (10)
4.	US Riveraine (11)	1–1 (7–6 p)	FC Eaunes/Labarthe-sur-Lèze (8)
5.	Espoirs Puymaurinois (12)	0–6	AO Cornebarrieu (10)
6.	AS Villemur (10)	4–1	FC Montastruc (13)
7.	Rieumes FC Savès 31 (13)	0–3	EFC Aurignac (9)
8.	FC Mahorais Toulouse (12)	1–5 (a.e.t.)	Entente Landorthe-Labarthe-Estancarbon-Savarthès (9)
9.	UE Bossòst (10)	2–4	FC Canal Nord (11)
10.	FC Venerque-Le Vernet (11)	1–0	Toulouse Football Sud (12)
11.	US Léguevin (8)	3–3 (5–4 p) (Note: Tie reversed with agreement of both clubs.)	Toulouse Rangueil FC (9)
12.	US Bagatelle (12)	3–1	AS Mondonville (10)
13.	Toulouse Foot Compans Caffarelli (10)	4–0	AS Castelnau-d'Estrétefonds (8)
14.	Toulouse ACF (10)	3–1	Bruguières SC (12)
15.	Fontenilles FC (11)	2–1	US Ramonville (10)
16.	US Encausse-Soueich-Ganties (9)	1–1 (5–3 p)	Pyrénées Sud Comminges (11)
17.	Baziège OC (8)	4–0	FC Bessières-Buzet (13)
18.	Inter FC (9)	2–2 (4–2 p)	Comminges St Gaudens (8)
19.	St Lys Olympique FC (10)	5–1	US Bagnères Luchon Sports/Cierp-Gaud/Marignac (11)
20.	US Auriacaise (11)	2–3	Confluent/Lacroix/Saubens/Pinsaguel (11)
21.	FC Mabroc (8)	2–2 (3–4 p)	JS Toulouse Pradettes (8)
22.	Lagardelle Miremont Sports (11)	3–4	AS Toulouse Lardenne (11)
23.	EF Castelmaurou Verfeil (10)	2–2 (4–3 p)	AS Toulouse Mirail (10)
24.	ASPTT Grand Toulouse (13)	0–9	ERCSO L'Isle-en-Dodon (9)
25.	Lauragais FC (10)	2–1	JS Brax (10)
26.	AS Hersoise (11)	4–1	EF Montjoire-La Magdelaine (13)
27.	JE Toulousaine Croix-Daurade (9)	3–1	UA Fenouillet (8)

These matches are from the Gers district and were played on 23, 24 and 25 August 2019.

First round results: Occitanie (Gers)
Tie no	Home team (tier)	Score	Away team (tier)
1.	UA Vic-Fezensac (9)	3–0	FC Mirandais (9)
2.	Rassemblement Bas Armangnac FC (10)	2–4	Forza Labéjan-St Jean-le-Comtal (10)
3.	Mauvezin FC (11)	5–2	Entente Simorre-Samaron (9)
4.	ES Cologne-Sarrant (9)	4–0	US Pessanaise (11)
5.	FC Pavien (8)	2–0 (Note: Tie reversed with agreement of both clubs.)	FC L'Islois (8)
6.	Sud Astarac 2010 (9)	1–3	US Aignanaise (9)
7.	Ste Christie-Preignan AS (9)	4–0	Eauze FC (9)
8.	US Lectoure (10)	3–2 (a.e.t.)	US Aubiet (9)
9.	AS Manciet (10)	3–4 (a.e.t.)	SC St Clar (9)

These matches are from the Hérault district, and were played on 23, 24 and 25 August 2019.

First round results: Occitanie (Hérault)
Tie no	Home team (tier)	Score	Away team (tier)
1.	AS St Martin Montpellier (12)	0–7	Baillargues-St Brès-Valergues (8)
2.	FC Montpeyroux (12)	2–4	FC Petit Bard (8)
3.	FCO Valras-Serignan (10)	4–0	ASPTT Lunel (12)
4.	AS Canétoise (10)	3–0 (Note: Tie won by means of forfeit)	ES Sète (10)
5.	Entente Corneilhan-Lignan (9)	2–1 (a.e.t.)	Olympique St-André-de-Sangonis (8)
6.	ES Paulhan-Pézenas (10)	4–0	ES Coeur Hérault (11)
7.	US Villeneuvoise (12)	4–1	Olympique Midi Lirou Capestang-Poilhes (11)
8.	SC St Thibérien (9)	2–1 (a.e.t.)	ES Pérols (8)
9.	ROC Social Sète (11)	3–2	AS Celleneuve (11)
10.	Stade Lunaret Nord (12)	0–3	FC Lespignan-Vendres (9)
11.	ES Cazouls-Marauusan-Maureilham (11)	2–5	Olympique La Peyrade FC (9)
12.	RC Vedasien (9)	1–0	Jacou Clapiers FA (9)
13.	USO Florensac-Pinet (10)	5–3 (a.e.t.)	AS Pignan (8)
14.	AS Mireval (11)	1–2	US Montagnacoise (8)
15.	AS Valerguoise (11)	2–5	AS Puissalicon-Magalas (9)
16.	SA Marsillarguois (12)	3–2	FC Neffies (13)
17.	ASPTT Montpellier (12)	1–3	US Plaissanaise (12)
18.	FC Pradéen (10)	4–5	FC Sussargues-Berange (10)
19.	AS Juvignac (10)	3–1	FC Villeneuve-lès-Béziers (12)
20.	FC St Pargoire (12)	1–7	FO Sud Hérault (9)
21.	FC Thongue et Libron (11)	1–3 (a.e.t.)	FC Lamalou-les-Bains (12)
22.	FC Lavérune (9)	5–0	US Colombiers Nissan Montady (12)
23.	Bouzigues-Loupian AC (11)	2–3	US Pougetoise (11)
24.	AS St Gilloise (10)	2–3	RC Lemasson (11)
25.	AS La Grand-Motte (12)	0–0 (4–2 p)	RSO Cournonterral (10)
26.	US Villeveyracoise (11)	0–3	Crabe Sportif Marseillan (11)
27.	FCO Viassois (12)	3–1	Avenir Castriote (11)
28.	AC Alignanais (10)	0–7	AS Atlas Paillade (11)
29.	FC Aspiranais (11)	1–3	Sète OFC (10)
30.	RS Gigeannais (11)	5–0	AS St Mathieu-de-Tréviers (10)

These matches are from the Lot district, and were played on 23, 24 and 25 August 2019.

First round results: Occitanie (Lot)
Tie no	Home team (tier)	Score	Away team (tier)
1.	AS Causse Limargue (8)	1–5	Figeac Quercy (8)
2.	Uxello FC Capdenac (11)	3–2	Entente Cajarc Cenevières (9)
3.	Val Roc Foot (9)	2–2 (4–2 p)	FC Lalbenque-Fontanes (8)
4.	Entente Ségala (9)	1–3	ES Souillac-Cressenac-Gignac (9)
5.	Élan Marivalois (9)	3–2 (a.e.t.)	Haut Célé FC (9)
6.	CL Cuzance (11)	0–1	Puy-l'Évêque-Prayssac FC (9)
7.	ES St Germain (10)	1–3	AS Montcabrier (9)

These matches are from the Hautes-Pyrénées district, and were played on 23, 24 and 25 August 2019.

First round results: Occitanie (Hautes-Pyrénées)
Tie no	Home team (tier)	Score	Away team (tier)
1.	Horgues-Odos FC (9)	1–2 (a.e.t.)	FC Bazillac (12)
2.	US Marquisat Bénac (9)	1–4	Soues Cigognes FC (8)
3.	FC Val d'Adour (9)	2–2 (2–4 p)	FC Plateau-Lannezman (9)
4.	Tarbes FC (9)	4–3	ASC Barbazan-Debat (9)
5.	US Tarbais Nouvelle Vague (9)	0–1 (a.e.t.)	Séméac OFC (8)
6.	US Côteaux (10)	0–2	Elan Pyrénéen Bazet-Bordères-Lagarde (9)
7.	Boutons d'Or Ger (9)	3–1	FC des Nestes (9)

These matches are from the Pyrénées-Orientales district, and were played on 23, 24 and 25 August 2019.

First round results: Occitanie (Pyrénées-Orientales)
Tie no	Home team (tier)	Score	Away team (tier)
1.	Les Amis de Cédric Brunier (10)	3–2 (a.e.t.) (Note: A challenge was made by Le Boulou-St Jean-Pla-de-Courts FC that the coach of Les Amis de Cédric Brunier was suspended for the game. This challenge was initially upheld on 27 August, but then overturned on 30 August when it was discovered there had been a miscount in the number of suspended games which has passed.)	Le Boulou-St Jean-Pla-de-Courts FC (10)
2.	FC Le Soler (9)	0–2	Baho-Pézilla FC (10)
3.	Céret FC (10)	2–3	Salanca FC (9)
4.	FC St-Féliu-d'Avall (11)	1–5	Olympiqu Haut Vallespir (12)
5.	RC Perpignan Sud (11)	1–3	FC Thuirinois (9)
6.	AS Prades (12)	0–7	FC Villelongue (9)
7.	Association Théza Alénya Corneilla FC (9)	3–1	FC Cerdagne-Font-Romeu-Capcir (10)
8.	FC Laurentin (9)	4–3 (a.e.t.) (Note: FC Laurentin penalised for fielding a suspended player. Cabestany OC qualify.)	Cabestany OC (8)
9.	AS Bages (10)	1–2	SO Rivesaltais (9)

These matches are from the Tarn district, and were played on 23, 24 and 25 August 2019.

First round results: Occitanie (Tarn)
Tie no	Home team (tier)	Score	Away team (tier)
1.	Cambounet FC (9)	3–4	La Cremade FC (9)
2.	US Carmaux (10)	3–3 (5–6 p)	AS Vallée du Sor (10)
3.	RC St Benoît (10)	3–1	Valence OF (10)
4.	Les Copains d'Abord (8)	0–2	US Castres (8)
5.	Sport Benfica Graulhet (9)	3–1	Sorèze FC (10)
6.	AS Pampelonnaise (10)	4–2	US Cordes (10)
7.	FC Vignoble 81 (9)	5–0	US Labruguièroise (9)
8.	AS Lagrave (11)	0–3	St Juéry OF (8)
9.	FC Castelnau-de-Lévis (9)	1–3	AS Giroussens (8)
10.	AF Pays d'Oc 81 (10) (Note: AF Pays d'Oc 81 replaced Fréjairolles-Cambon-Collines in the original draw.)	3–0 (Note: Tie won by means of forfeit.)	FC Labastide-de-Lévis (11)
11.	US Autan (10)	0–3	US St Sulpice (8)
12.	Réalmont FC (9)	3–2	Olympique Lautrec (9)
13.	FC Le Garric (11)	2–5	FC Pays Mazamétain (8)

These matches are from the Tarn-et-Garonne district, and were played on 23, 24, 25 and 28 August 2019.

First round results: Occitanie (Tarn-et-Garonne)
Tie no	Home team (tier)	Score	Away team (tier)
1.	Avenir Lavitois (8)	3–0 (Note: Tie reversed with agreement of both clubs.)	AS Bressols (8)
2.	AS Stéphanoise (10)	0–1	FC Nègrepelisse-Montricoux (8)
3.	Coquelicots Montéchois FC (9)	1–4	FCUS Molières (9)
4.	VS Aucamvilloise (11)	1–8	SC Lafrancaisain (9)
5.	Deux Ponts FC (9)	3–0	Stade Larrazet-Garganvillar (9)
6.	US Malause (11)	0–2	AC Bastidien (9)
7.	St Nauphary AC (10)	2–1	JS Meauzacaise (8)
8.	Entente Valver Foot 82 (11)	0–6	La Nicolaite (9)
9.	Confluences FC (9)	6–2	FC Brulhois (9)

=== Second round ===
These matches are from the Ariège district, and were played on 30 and 31 August 2019 and 1 September 2019.

Second round results: Occitanie (Ariège)
Tie no	Home team (tier)	Score	Away team (tier)
1.	FC St Girons (8)	1–6	Luzenac AP (6)
2.	FC Laroque d'Olmes (9)	1–0	AS Rieux-de-Pelleport (9)
3.	Vernajoul AC (10)	0–1	ES Fossatoise (8)
4.	FC Pays d'Olmes (9)	1–4	ES St Jean-du-Falga (9)
5.	Tarascon FC (9)	0–13	FC Foix (7)

These matches are from the Aude district, and were played on 30 and 31 August 2019 and 1 September 2019.

Second round results: Occitanie (Aude)
Tie no	Home team (tier)	Score	Away team (tier)
1.	ES Ste Eulalie-Villesèquelande (8)	0–1	MJC Gruissan (7)
2.	FC Chalabre (10)	1–2 (a.e.t.)	CO Castelnaudary (7)
3.	UF Lézignanais (8)	3–1	FC Briolet (8)
4.	Trèbes FC (7)	2–4 (a.e.t.)	US Conques (7)
5.	USA Pezens (8)	3–0	UFC Narbonne (9)
6.	Haut-Minervois Olympique (9)	4–1	FC Caux-et-Sauzens (10)
7.	Entente Naurouze-Labastide (9)	0–1	US Minervois (9)
8.	Olympic Cuxac-d'Aude (10)	0–13	FU Narbonne (6)
9.	FC St Nazairois (11)	2–0	AS Ventenac (10)
10.	EC Coursan (10)	1–6	FA Carcassonne (6)

These matches are from the Aveyron district, and were played on 30 and 31 August 2019 and 1 September 2019.

Second round results: Occitanie (Aveyron)
Tie no	Home team (tier)	Score	Away team (tier)
1.	SO Millau (9)	0–3	Onet-le-Château (6)
2.	Olympique Martiel (14)	3–4 (a.e.t.)	US Pays Rignacoise (9)
3.	JS Lévézou (10)	2–7	JS Bassin Aveyron (8)
4.	FC Sources de l'Aveyron (8)	11–2	Ségala-Rieupeyroux-Salvetat (8)
5.	US Espalion (8)	1–1 (4–5 p)	Stade St Affricain (8)
6.	Entente Salles Curan/Curan (9)	1–2	US Pays Alzuréen (9)
7.	FC Villeneuvois/Diège (9)	1–2	Espoir FC 88 (8)
8.	US Argence/Viadène (10)	2–2 (4–3 p)	AS Aguessac (9)
9.	SC Sébazac (9)	2–2 (5–3 p)	FC Naucellois (8)
10.	AO Bozouls (10)	1–6	US Bas Rouergue (9)
11.	AS Olemps (8)	0–1	FC Monastère (8)
12.	Druelle FC (7)	1–1 (3–2 p)	Luc Primaube FC (7)
13.	FC Agen-Gages (10)	1–4	Entente St Georges/St Rome (8)

These matches are from the Gard-Lozère district, and were played on 30 and 31 August 2019 and 1 September 2019.

Second round results: Occitanie (Gard-Lozère)
Tie no	Home team (tier)	Score	Away team (tier)
1.	AS Caissargues (10)	0–3 (Note: GC Uchaud penalised for currently unknown reasons. AS Caisssargues qualify.)	GC Uchaud (7)
2.	AF Lozère (6)	3–0 (Note: AEC St Gilles did not turn up for the game. AF Lozère qualify by means of forfeit.)	AEC St Gilles (8)
3.	FC Val de Cèze (9)	3–5 (a.e.t.)	US Trèfle (8)
4.	US Monoblet (9)	7–2	Entente Perrier Vergèze (7)
5.	Olympique Fourquésien (11)	0–4	ES Aigues-Vives/Aubais (10)
6.	JSO Aubord (11)	0–2	AS Rousson (6)
7.	AS St Privat-des-Vieux (9)	4–3 (a.e.t.)	RC Générac (9)
8.	ES Grau-du-Roi (9)	2–4 (6–5 p)	CO Soleil Levant Nîmes (7)
9.	AS St Paulet (10)	2–3 (Note: SC Anduzien penalised for fielding suspended players. AS St Paulet qualify.)	SC Anduzien (7)
10.	FC Moussac (11)	0–4	SO Aimargues (8)
11.	FC Cévennes (10)	0–3	ES Pays d'Uzes (6)
12.	JS Chemin Bas d'Avignon (8)	3–0	ES Suménoise (9)
13.	US Peyrolaise (11)	1–2	ES Trois Moulins (9)
14.	OC Redessan (9)	2–0	CA Bessegeoise (10)
15.	ESC Vézénobres (10)	4–2 (a.e.t.)	FC La Calmette (11)
16.	ES Marguerittes (10)	2–2 (2–4 p)	FC Vauverdois (8)
17.	Omnisports St Hilaire-La Jasse (11)	3–3 (6–7 p)	FC Pont-St-Esprit (10)
18.	US Garons (11)	3–1	GS Gardois (9)
19.	AS Nîmes Athletic (9)	0–1	FC Langlade (10)
20.	AS Poulx (9)	2–1	FC Chusclan-Laudun-l'Ardoise (8)
21.	SA Cigalois (11)	2–4	FC Bagnols Pont (6)

These matches are from the Haute-Garonne district, and were played on 30 and 31 August 2019 and 1 September 2019.

Second round results: Occitanie (Haute-Garonne)
Tie no	Home team (tier)	Score	Away team (tier)
1.	JS Carbonne (8)	0–1	Avenir Fonsorbais (7)
2.	FC Canal Nord (11)	1–3	Lauragais FC (10)
3.	JE Toulousaine Croix-Daurade (9)	2–4	AS Lavernose-Lherm-Mauzac (8)
4.	AO Cornebarrieu (10)	3–3 (3–4 p)	Inter FC (9)
5.	EF Castelmaurou Verfeil (10)	1–1 (2–4 p)	JS Cugnaux (8)
6.	US Riveraine (11)	3–2	ES St Simon (7)
7.	Toulouse Olympique Aviation Club (9)	1–3	US Salies-du-Salat/Mane/St Martory (7)
8.	JS Toulouse Pradettes (8)	0–4	Olympique Girou FC (6)
9.	Grenade FC (10)	2–1	JS Cintegabelle (8)
10.	Toulouse ACF (10)	0–6	US Cazères (6)
11.	US Seysses-Frouzins (7)	1–2	US Castanéenne (6)
12.	AS Hersoise (11)	2–13	Toulouse Métropole FC (6)
13.	US Pouvourville (8)	1–3 (a.e.t.)	US Revel (6)
14.	US Pibrac (6)	2–1	Étoile Aussonnaise (6)
15.	FC Beauzelle (8)	1–4	Juventus de Papus (7)
16.	AS Villemur (10)	0–6	L'Union St Jean FC (6)
17.	Toulouse Foot Compans Caffarelli (10)	0–1	US Plaisance (7)
18.	AS Toulouse Lardenne (11)	4–0	Baziège OC (8)
19.	ERCSO L'Isle-en-Dodon (9)	5–2	St Lys Olympique FC (10)
20.	Pucho United (12)	0–2	Entente Boulogne-Péguilhan (8)
21.	US Encausse-Soueich-Ganties (9)	1–3	FC Launaguet (8)
22.	St Orens FC (6)	0–2	Saint-Alban Aucamville FC (6)
23.	Entente Landorthe-Labarthe-Estancarbon-Savarthès (9)	0–3	US Castelginest (8)
24.	FC Venerque-Le Vernet (11)	1–2	US Léguevin (8)
25.	Fontenilles FC (11)	0–5	AS Portet-Carrefour-Récébédou (6)
26.	EFC Aurignac (9)	0–5	AS Tournefeuille (6)
27.	Confluent/Lacroix/Saubens/Pinsaguel (11)	3–1	US Bagatelle (12)

These matches are from the Gers district, and were played on 30 and 31 August 2019 and 1 September 2019.

Second round results: Occitanie (Gers)
Tie no	Home team (tier)	Score	Away team (tier)
1.	US Lectoure (10)	2–3	JS Tougetoise (8)
2.	Mauvezin FC (11)	1–1 (5–4 p)	SC St Clar (9)
3.	ES Cologne-Sarrant (9)	2–6	FC Pavien (8)
4.	UA Vic-Fezensac (9)	2–4 (a.e.t.)	Ste Christie-Preignan AS (9)
5.	US Aignanaise (9)	3–0	ES Gimontoise (8)
6.	Forza Labéjan-St Jean-le-Comtal (10)	0–7	AS Fleurance-La Sauvetat (7)

These matches are from the Hérault district, and were played on 30 and 31 August 2019 and 1 September 2019.

Second round results: Occitanie (Hérault)
Tie no	Home team (tier)	Score	Away team (tier)
1.	AS Puissalicon-Magalas (9)	2–3	FC Petit Bard (8)
2.	USO Florensac-Pinet (10)	2–1	Castelnau Le Crès FC (7)
3.	ROC Social Sète (11)	1–5 (a.e.t.)	FC Lavérune (9)
4.	FCO Valras-Serignan (10)	2–3	Stade Balarucois (6)
5.	RC Lemasson (11)	0–2	Arceaux Montpellier (7)
6.	US Villeneuvoise (12)	2–7	AS Canétoise (10)
7.	Mèze Stade FC (8)	2–0	CE Palavas (7)
8.	Entente Corneilhan-Lignan (9)	2–2 (4–2 p)	PI Vendargues (7)
9.	US Mauguio Carnon (8)	1–1 (2–4 p)	Entente St Clément-Montferrier (6)
10.	US Montagnacoise (8)	3–6	Baillargues-St Brès-Valergues (8)
11.	US Pougetoise (11)	2–6	ES Paulhan-Pézenas (10)
12.	FCO Viassois (12)	1–3	US Béziers (7)
13.	RC Vedasien (9)	1–0	La Clermontaise Football (6)
14.	Olympique La Peyrade FC (9)	2–1	FC Lespignan-Vendres (9)
15.	US Plaissanaise (12)	1–8	FC Sussargues-Berange (10)
16.	SA Marsillarguois (12)	0–5	SC St Thibérien (9)
17.	AS Juvignac (10)	2–1	AS Gignacois (8)
18.	SC Cers-Portiragnes (7)	3–5 (a.e.t.)	AS Frontignan AC (6)
19.	AS La Grand-Motte (12)	0–2	Crabe Sportif Marseillan (11)
20.	RS Gigeannais (11)	0–4	GC Lunel (6)
21.	AS Atlas Paillade (11)	1–0	AS Montarnaud-St Paul-Vaihauques-Murviel (6)
22.	Sète OFC (10)	1–7	AS Lattoise (6)
23.	FC Lamalou-les-Bains (12)	3–5	FO Sud Hérault (9)

These matches are from the Lot district, and were played on 30 and 31 August 2019 and 1 September 2019.

Second round results: Occitanie (Lot)
Tie no	Home team (tier)	Score	Away team (tier)
1.	ES Souillac-Cressenac-Gignac (9)	2–3	Cahors FC (7)
2.	Puy-l'Évêque-Prayssac FC (9)	0–5	Pradines-St Vincent-Douelle-Mercuès Olt (7)
3.	AS Montcabrier (9)	2–3	Élan Marivalois (9)
4.	Uxello FC Capdenac (11)	1–6	FC Biars-Bretenoux (7)
5.	Figeac Quercy (8)	2–1	Val Roc Foot (9)

These matches are from the Hautes-Pyrénées district, and were played on 30 and 31 August 2019 and 1 September 2019.

Second round results: Occitanie (Hautes-Pyrénées)
Tie no	Home team (tier)	Score	Away team (tier)
1.	FC Pyrénées/Vallées des Gaves (8)	1–3	FC Lourdais XI (6)
2.	Boutons d'Or Ger (9)	1–4	Tarbes Pyrénées Football (6)
3.	ASC Aureilhan (8)	0–4	Séméac OFC (8)
4.	Elan Pyrénéen Bazet-Bordères-Lagarde (9)	0–4	FC Plateau-Lannezman (9)
5.	FC Bazillac (12)	0–4	Juillan OS (7)
6.	ES Haut Adour (8)	2–1	Quand Même Orleix (8)
7.	Soues Cigognes FC (8)	3–1	Tarbes FC (9)

These matches are from the Pyrénées-Orientales district, and were played on 30 and 31 August 2019 and 1 September 2019.

Second round results: Occitanie (Pyrénées-Orientales)
Tie no	Home team (tier)	Score	Away team (tier)
1.	Salanca FC (9)	2–1	Les Amis de Cédric Brunier (10)
2.	BECE FC Vallée de l'Aigly (8)	1–2	Elne FC (8)
3.	FC Villelongue (9)	0–1	FC Alberes Argelès (6)
4.	Sporting Perpignan Nord (7)	4–0	AS Perpignan Méditerranée (7)
5.	Olympiqu Haut Vallespir (12)	2–5	SO Rivesaltais (9)
6.	Association Théza Alénya Corneilla FC (9)	0–3	OC Perpignan (6)
7.	FC Thuirinois (9)	0–4	FC St Estève (6)
8.	Baho-Pézilla FC (10)	1–2	Cabestany OC (8)

These matches are from the Tarn district, and were played on 30 and 31 August 2019 and 1 September 2019.

Second round results: Occitanie (Tarn)
Tie no	Home team (tier)	Score	Away team (tier)
1.	FC Graulhet (7)	1–3	FC Marssac-Rivières-Senouillac Rives du Tarn (6)
2.	AF Pays d'Oc 81 (10)	1–0	AS Pampelonnaise (10)
3.	US Gaillacois (8)	1–3	St Juéry OF (8)
4.	AS Giroussens (8)	3–1	RC St Benoît (10)
5.	AS Vallée du Sor (10)	2–4	US Albi (7)
6.	Lavaur FC (8)	1–5	US St Sulpice (8)
7.	FC Pays Mazamétain (8)	0–2	US Castres (8)
8.	FC Vignoble 81 (9)	1–1 (3–4 p)	Sport Benfica Graulhet (9)
9.	La Cremade FC (9)	5–3	Réalmont FC (9)

These matches are from the Tarn-et-Garonne district, and were played on 30 and 31 August 2019 and 1 September 2019.

Second round results: Occitanie (Tarn-et-Garonne)
Tie no	Home team (tier)	Score	Away team (tier)
1.	FC Nègrepelisse-Montricoux (8)	0–3	Entente Golfech-St Paul-d'Espis (6)
2.	Deux Ponts FC (9)	1–5 (a.e.t.)	Montauban FCTG (7)
3.	AS Mas-Grenier (8)	0–1	AA Grisolles (7)
4.	Avenir Lavitois (8)	2–4	La Nicolaite (9)
5.	Confluences FC (9)	– (Note: Match stopped with the scoreline 2–2. Confluences FC penalised. Cazes Olympique qualify.)	Cazes Olympique (7)
6.	St Nauphary AC (10)	1–2	SC Lafrancaisain (9)
7.	AC Bastidien (9)	1–2	FCUS Molières (9)

=== Third round ===
These matches were played between 13 and 15 September 2019.

Third round results: Occitanie
Tie no	Home team (tier)	Score	Away team (tier)
1.	Espoir FC 88 (8)	1–0	FC Sources de l'Aveyron (8)
2.	US Argence/Viadène (10)	1–4	Toulouse Rodéo FC (5)
3.	US Pays Rignacoise (9)	0–1	Olympique Girou FC (6)
4.	St Juéry OF (8)	1–2	FC Marssac-Rivières-Senouillac Rives du Tarn (6)
5.	Pradines-St Vincent-Douelle-Mercuès Olt (7)	2–1	Figeac Quercy (8)
6.	JS Bassin Aveyron (8)	0–1	Druelle FC (7)
7.	FC Biars-Bretenoux (7)	1–2	Onet-le-Château (6)
8.	FC Monastère (8)	1–1 (3–4 p)	Entente St Georges/St Rome (8)
9.	US Pays Alzuréen (9)	0–3	Stade St Affricain (8)
10.	L'Union St Jean FC (6)	4–2	US Albi (7)
11.	US Bas Rouergue (9)	3–2	SC Sébazac (9)
12.	Sport Benfica Graulhet (9)	0–1	US Castres (8)
13.	Lauragais FC (10)	0–4	US Pibrac (6)
14.	La Nicolaite (9)	0–3	Cahors FC (7)
15.	Élan Marivalois (9)	0–1	La Cremade FC (9)
16.	Toulouse Métropole FC (6)	1–1 (5–4 p)	AA Grisolles (7)
17.	CO Castelnaudary (7)	0–2	AS Muret (5)
18.	Cazes Olympique (7)	2–2 (4–5 p)	US Castelginest (8)
19.	US St Sulpice (8)	0–4	Saint-Alban Aucamville FC (6)
20.	AF Pays d'Oc 81 (10)	0–5	Juventus de Papus (7)
21.	AS Portet-Carrefour-Récébédou (6)	0–4	Blagnac FC (5)
22.	USA Pezens (8)	5–1	AS Giroussens (8)
23.	SC Lafrancaisain (9)	1–3	US Revel (6)
24.	US Riveraine (11)	0–1	ES St Jean-du-Falga (9)
25.	FC Foix (7)	1–0	ES Fossatoise (8)
26.	US Plaisance (7)	2–3	Montauban FCTG (7)
27.	Séméac OFC (8)	0–1	ES Haut Adour (8)
28.	FC Laroque d'Olmes (9)	0–8	Balma SC (5)
29.	FC Launaguet (8)	0–4	JS Cugnaux (8)
30.	FC Plateau-Lannezman (9)	5–3 (a.e.t.)	AS Lavernose-Lherm-Mauzac (8)
31.	Inter FC (9)	4–0	FCUS Molières (9)
32.	Luzenac AP (6)	2–3 (a.e.t.)	US Cazères (6)
33.	Confluent/Lacroix/Saubens/Pinsaguel (11)	0–4	US Castanéenne (6)
34.	Avenir Fonsorbais (7)	0–2	Entente Golfech-St Paul-d'Espis (6)
35.	Ste Christie-Preignan AS (9)	1–3	Soues Cigognes FC (8)
36.	Juillan OS (7)	4–5 (a.e.t.)	AS Fleurance-La Sauvetat (7)
37.	US Aignanaise (9)	1–2 (a.e.t.)	Grenade FC (10)
38.	AS Toulouse Lardenne (11)	1–6	Entente Boulogne-Péguilhan (8)
39.	US Léguevin (8)	2–3	ERCSO L'Isle-en-Dodon (9)
40.	JS Tougetoise (8)	0–3	US Salies-du-Salat/Mane/St Martory (7)
41.	Mauvezin FC (11)	0–4	Auch Football (5)
42.	AS Tournefeuille (6)	2–1 (a.e.t.)	Tarbes Pyrénées Football (6)
43.	FC Pavien (8)	0–2	FC Lourdais XI (6)
44.	JS Chemin Bas d'Avignon (8)	0–5	Olympique Alès (5)
45.	AS Poulx (9)	0–2	FC Bagnols Pont (6)
46.	FC Lavérune (9)	2–1 (Note: Tie reversed from original draw.)	SO Aimargues (8)
47.	US Trèfle (8)	2–3	US Monoblet (9)
48.	US Garons (11)	1–4	ES Trois Moulins (9)
49.	FC Pont-St-Esprit (10)	0–7	AF Lozère (6)
50.	AS Caissargues (10)	3–2	Arceaux Montpellier (7)
51.	OC Redessan (9)	0–3	Entente St Clément-Montferrier (6)
52.	AS Rousson (6)	1–2 (a.e.t.)	Stade Beaucairois (5)
53.	FC Vauverdois (8)	6–3 (a.e.t.)	AS St Privat-des-Vieux (9)
54.	AS St Paulet (10)	0–2	GC Lunel (6)
55.	AS Atlas Paillade (11)	0–1	AS Fabrègues (5)
56.	ES Aigues-Vives/Aubais (10)	0–1	AS Lattoise (6)
57.	FC Langlade (10)	4–2	Crabe Sportif Marseillan (11)
58.	RC Vedasien (9)	0–1	US Béziers (7)
59.	ES Grau-du-Roi (9)	0–2	AS Frontignan AC (6)
60.	Olympique La Peyrade FC (9)	1–6	ES Pays d'Uzes (6)
61.	AS Juvignac (10)	0–5	US Salinières Aigues Mortes (5)
62.	ESC Vézénobres (10)	0–2	FC St Estève (6)
63.	FC Sussargues-Berange (10)	2–1	Stade Balarucois (6)
64.	SC St Thibérien (9)	2–2 (3–5 p)	Mèze Stade FC (8)
65.	FC Petit Bard (8)	3–2 (a.e.t.)	Baillargues-St Brès-Valergues (8)
66.	FO Sud Hérault (9)	1–3	SO Rivesaltais (9)
67.	ES Paulhan-Pézenas (10)	2–1	USO Florensac-Pinet (10)
68.	FC Alberes Argelès (6)	4–1	FA Carcassonne (6)
69.	AS Canétoise (10)	1–0	OC Perpignan (6)
70.	FC St Nazairois (11)	0–6	Canet Roussillon FC (5)
71.	Haut-Minervois Olympique (9)	1–3	FU Narbonne (6)
72.	Cabestany OC (8)	0–1	US Conques (7)
73.	MJC Gruissan (7)	0–2	RCO Agde (5)
74.	Elne FC (8)	0–1	UF Lézignanais (8)
75.	US Minervois (9)	1–2	Sporting Perpignan Nord (7)
76.	Entente Corneilhan-Lignan (9)	4–0	Salanca FC (9)

=== Fourth round ===
These matches were played on 28 and 29 September 2019.

Fourth round results: Occitanie
Tie no	Home team (tier)	Score	Away team (tier)
1.	FC Vauverdois (8)	0–3	US Salinières Aigues Mortes (5)
2.	FC Bagnols Pont (6)	4–3	GC Lunel (6)
3.	US Monoblet (9)	4–1	ES Trois Moulins (9)
4.	FC Petit Bard (8)	2–4	Olympique Alès (5)
5.	AS Caissargues (10)	2–4	Mèze Stade FC (8)
6.	Stade Beaucairois (5)	3–1	ES Pays d'Uzes (6)
7.	FC Langlade (10)	1–4	AF Lozère (6)
8.	ES St Jean-du-Falga (9)	0–2	US Castanéenne (6)
9.	Grenade FC (10)	0–1	UF Lézignanais (8)
10.	Juventus de Papus (7)	3–1	FU Narbonne (6)
11.	US Pibrac (6)	1–3 (a.e.t.)	AS Tournefeuille (6)
12.	JS Cugnaux (8)	2–1 (a.e.t.)	US Revel (6)
13.	Inter FC (9)	0–6	Canet Roussillon FC (5)
14.	USA Pezens (8)	1–6	FC Alberes Argelès (6)
15.	FC Foix (7)	2–0	Balma SC (5)
16.	FC Lavérune (9)	0–2	AS Canétoise (10)
17.	FC Sussargues-Berange (10)	0–2	FC St Estève (6)
18.	Entente Corneilhan-Lignan (9)	1–3	Entente St Clément-Montferrier (6)
19.	AS Lattoise (6)	6–0	US Conques (7)
20.	AS Frontignan AC (6)	2–1	FC Sète 34 (4)
21.	Sporting Perpignan Nord (7)	0–2	AS Fabrègues (5)
22.	SO Rivesaltais (9)	0–0 (1–4 p)	RCO Agde (5)
23.	ES Paulhan-Pézenas (10)	2–1 (a.e.t.)	US Béziers (7)
24.	Entente St Georges/St Rome (8)	0–4	Onet-le-Château (6)
25.	Blagnac FC (5)	1–1 (4–5 p)	US Colomiers Football (4)
26.	Stade St Affricain (8)	3–2	Cahors FC (7)
27.	Druelle FC (7)	0–0 (5–3 p)	Pradines-St Vincent-Douelle-Mercuès Olt (7)
28.	US Castres (8)	5–2	US Bas Rouergue (9)
29.	Auch Football (5)	2–0	Olympique Girou FC (6)
30.	La Cremade FC (9)	1–2	FC Marssac-Rivières-Senouillac Rives du Tarn (6)
31.	Espoir FC 88 (8)	0–1	L'Union St Jean FC (6)
32.	US Castelginest (8)	0–3 (a.e.t.)	AS Muret (5)
33.	Soues Cigognes FC (8)	3–2 (a.e.t.)	Entente Boulogne-Péguilhan (8)
34.	US Cazères (6)	3–2 (a.e.t.)	Montauban FCTG (7)
35.	Entente Golfech-St Paul-d'Espis (6)	2–1	AS Fleurance-La Sauvetat (7)
36.	US Salies-du-Salat/Mane/St Martory (7)	2–0	Toulouse Métropole FC (6)
37.	Toulouse Rodéo FC (5)	4–0	Saint-Alban Aucamville FC (6)
38.	FC Plateau-Lannezman (9)	0–1	FC Lourdais XI (6)
39.	ERCSO L'Isle-en-Dodon (9)	4–1	ES Haut Adour (8)

=== Fifth round ===
These matches were played on 12 and 13 October 2019, with one postponed to 23 October 2019.

Fifth round results: Occitanie
Tie no	Home team (tier)	Score	Away team (tier)
1.	US Castres (8)	1–3	FC Alberes Argelès (6)
2.	Canet Roussillon FC (5)	2–0	US Castanéenne (6)
3.	Juventus de Papus (7)	1–2	Toulouse Rodéo FC (5)
4.	Stade St Affricain (8)	0–0 (4–1 p)	AS Tournefeuille (6)
5.	FC St Estève (6)	0–1	AS Béziers (3)
6.	L'Union St Jean FC (6)	0–0 (4–3 p)	FC Foix (7)
7.	UF Lézignanais (8)	1–0	AS Muret (5)
8.	US Salies-du-Salat/Mane/St Martory (7)	1–0	JS Cugnaux (8)
9.	Druelle FC (7)	1–2	Auch Football (5)
10.	FC Marssac-Rivières-Senouillac Rives du Tarn (6)	3–1	Onet-le-Château (6)
11.	FC Lourdais XI (6)	2–1	Entente Golfech-St Paul-d'Espis (6)
12.	Soues Cigognes FC (8)	2–1 (a.e.t.)	US Cazères (6)
13.	ERCSO L'Isle-en-Dodon (9)	2–5	US Colomiers Football (4)
14.	RCO Agde (5)	3–1	FC Bagnols Pont (6)
15.	Mèze Stade FC (8)	1–2	AS Fabrègues (5)
16.	ES Paulhan-Pézenas (10)	0–2	AF Lozère (6)
17.	Olympique Alès (5)	3–1	AS Frontignan AC (6)
18.	Entente St Clément-Montferrier (6)	1–3	US Salinières Aigues Mortes (5)
19.	AS Canétoise (10)	1–2	US Monoblet (9)
20.	AS Lattoise (6)	3–2	Stade Beaucairois (5)

=== Sixth round ===
These matches were played on 26 and 27 October 2019.

Sixth round results: Occitanie
Tie no	Home team (tier)	Score	Away team (tier)
1.	AF Lozère (6)	2–3	AS Fabrègues (5)
2.	US Colomiers Football (4)	1–0	AS Béziers (3)
3.	Stade St Affricain (8)	1–3	AS Lattoise (6)
4.	US Salies-du-Salat/Mane/St Martory (7)	1–3	Olympique Alès (5)
5.	Soues Cigognes FC (8)	0–2	Auch Football (5)
6.	FC Marssac-Rivières-Senouillac Rives du Tarn (6)	3–1	FC Lourdais XI (6)
7.	US Monoblet (9)	1–2	RCO Agde (5)
8.	US Salinières Aigues Mortes (5)	1–3	L'Union St Jean FC (6)
9.	UF Lézignanais (8)	0–2	FC Alberes Argelès (6)
10.	Toulouse Rodéo FC (5)	3–1	Canet Roussillon FC (5)
