= 2015–16 Championnat de France Amateur 2 =

French football league season

Championnat de France amateur 2
- Season: 2015–16
- Champions: Reims reserves
- Promoted: (12 teams. See "Season outcomes" section)
- Relegated: (20 teams. See "Season outcomes" section)
- Top goalscorer: Said Habouch, ES Paulhan-Pézenas (23 goals)
- Biggest home win: 8–1 (AC Ajaccio (res) v Gonfreville, Round 24, 14 May 2016)
- Biggest away win: 0–5 (5 games)
- Highest scoring: 9 goals (AC Ajaccio (res) v Gonfreville, Round 24, 14 May 2016)

The 2015–16 Championnat de France amateur 2 is the 18th season of the fifth tier in the French football league system in its current format. The competition is contested by 112 clubs split geographically across 8 groups of 14 teams each. The teams include amateur clubs (although a few are semi-professional) and the reserve teams of professional clubs.

== Teams ==
22 teams were promoted as champions of the Division d'Honneur of the regional leagues. 12 teams were due to be relegated from the CFA, however two were eventually reprieved due to demotions or resignations of other teams. 7 teams due to be relegated to the regional leagues were also reprieved.

On 30 May 2015, Le Poíre-sur-Vie VF resigned from the National division, and took the place of their reserve team in CFA2, with the reserve team being relegated to the regional league.

On 5 June 2015, US Colomiers were placed in CFA2, following their relegation from the National, due to an administrative failure regarding the registration of an amateur player. However, this decision was overturned by appeal on 15 July 2015.

On 30 June 2015, CSO Amnéville requested relegation to the regional league.

=== Eligibility for Promotion ===
The reserve teams in CFA2 cannot obtain promotion if their centre de formation (equivalent to Academy) is deemed of insufficient quality. The following teams are not eligible for promotion from CFA2 this season:

Group A

- Brest (res)

Group C

- Niort (res)

Group D

- Bastia (res)
- Évian TG (res)
- Nîmes (res)

Group E

- Clermont (res)
- Dijon (res)

Group F

- Strasbourg (res)

Group G

- Amiens (res)
- Boulogne (res)

Group H

- AC Ajaccio (res)
- Paris FC (res)

== League tables ==
Group A
Pos	Team	Pld	W	D	L	GF	GA	GD	Pts	Promotion or relegation
1	Rennes (res) (C)	26	17	5	4	56	25	+31	82	Promotion to CFA
2	Granville (P)	26	13	9	4	47	29	+18	74	Promotion to CFA
3	Fougères	26	11	7	8	43	42	+1	66	
4	Saint-Brieuc	26	9	12	5	30	21	+9	65	
5	TA Rennes	26	11	5	10	43	45	−2	64	
6	Brest (res) (Note: Brest Reserves were penalised for fielding a suspended player in the game against Rennes Reserves on 21 November 2015. The match originally ended 1-1. Rennes Reserves were awarded a 3-0 win, and Brest Reserves had the 1 point for defeat withheld.)	26	9	9	8	35	36	−1	61	
7	Sablé	26	8	10	8	36	36	0	60	
8	Guingamp (res)	26	8	9	9	43	44	−1	59	
9	Laval (res)	26	9	4	13	40	43	−3	57	
10	Dinan-Léhon	26	7	9	10	33	36	−3	56	
11	Changé	26	7	6	13	26	45	−19	53	
12	Lannion	26	7	6	13	28	38	−10	53	
13	Pontivy (R)	26	6	9	11	32	41	−9	53	Relegation to Division d'Honneur
14	Saint-Lô (R)	26	6	8	12	26	37	−11	52	Relegation to Division d'Honneur

Source: FFF.fr
Rules for classification: 1) points; 2) head-to-head results; 3) head-to-head goal difference; 4) goal difference; 5) number of goals scored; 6) fair play points; 7) draw
(C) Champions; (P) Promoted; (R) Relegated
Notes:

Group B
Pos	Team	Pld	W	D	L	GF	GA	GD	Pts	Promotion or relegation
1	Chartres (C)	26	17	7	2	50	19	+31	84	Promotion to CFA
2	Avoine	26	13	9	4	39	26	+13	74	
3	Le Mans	26	13	4	9	30	26	+4	69	
4	Vertou	26	12	4	10	28	31	−3	66	
5	Angers (res)	26	9	8	9	47	33	+14	61	
6	Châtellerault (R)	26	7	12	7	34	34	0	59	Relegation to Division d'Honneur
7	Bourges 18	26	9	6	11	28	30	−2	59	
8	La Roche (Note: La Roche were penalised for fielding a suspended player in the game against Châtellerault on 27 February 2016. The game originally finished 1–0 to La Roche. Châtellerault were awarded a 3-0 win, and La Roche had the 1 point for defeat withheld.)	26	10	4	12	33	44	−11	59	
9	Tours (res)	26	9	6	11	47	49	−2	59	
10	Bressuire	26	8	8	10	30	33	−3	58	
11	Saint-Pryvé	26	8	8	10	34	35	−1	58	
12	Poiré-sur-Vie (R)	26	7	7	12	29	37	−8	54	Relegation to Division d'Honneur
13	Châteauroux (res) (R)	26	7	6	13	32	50	−18	53	Relegation to Division d'Honneur
14	Challans (R)	26	4	9	13	21	35	−14	47	Relegation to Division d'Honneur

Source: FFF.fr
Rules for classification: 1) points; 2) head-to-head results; 3) head-to-head goal difference; 4) goal difference; 5) number of goals scored; 6) fair play points; 7) draw
(C) Champions; (R) Relegated
Notes:

Group C
Pos	Team	Pld	W	D	L	GF	GA	GD	Pts	Promotion or relegation
1	ES Paulhan-Pézenas (C)	26	12	9	5	50	34	+16	71	Promotion to CFA
2	Montpellier (res) (P)	26	12	8	6	44	26	+18	70	Promotion to CFA
3	Anglet	26	12	3	11	31	31	0	65	
4	Marmande	26	10	7	9	39	32	+7	63	
5	Toulouse (res)	26	10	6	10	38	40	−2	62	
6	Castanéenne	26	9	8	9	35	38	−3	61	
7	Niort (res)	26	8	11	7	32	26	+6	61	
8	Lège Cap Ferret	26	8	10	8	38	44	−6	60	
9	Limoges	26	9	7	10	26	32	−6	60	
10	Balma	26	8	9	9	30	29	+1	59	
11	Aurillac	26	7	12	7	28	34	−6	59	
12	Angoulême	26	7	9	10	26	34	−8	56	
13	Blagnac (R)	26	6	10	10	33	41	−8	54	Relegation to Division d'Honneur
14	Villenave (R)	26	8	3	15	32	41	−9	53	Relegation to Division d'Honneur

Source: FFF.fr
Rules for classification: 1) points; 2) head-to-head results; 3) head-to-head goal difference; 4) goal difference; 5) number of goals scored; 6) fair play points; 7) draw
(C) Champions; (P) Promoted; (R) Relegated

Group D
Pos	Team	Pld	W	D	L	GF	GA	GD	Pts	Promotion or relegation
1	Toulon (C)	24	15	6	3	48	23	+25	75	
2	Annecy (P)	24	12	5	7	31	22	+9	65	Promotion to CFA
3	Nîmes (res)	24	12	4	8	42	29	+13	64	
4	Borgo	24	11	4	9	40	32	+8	61	
5	Cannet	24	9	8	7	44	38	+6	59	
6	Bastia (res)	24	9	5	10	36	36	0	56	
7	Alès	24	8	7	9	41	46	−5	55	
8	Évian TG (res)	24	8	6	10	35	36	−1	54	
9	Agde	24	7	6	11	33	42	−9	51	
10	Fabrègues	24	5	11	8	28	39	−11	50	
11	Île-Rousse (Note: Île-Rousse were penalised for fielding a suspended player in the game against Évian TG Reserves on 23 January 2016. The match originally ended 1-1. Évian TG Reserves were awarded a 3-0 win, and Île-Rousse had the 1 point for defeat withheld.)	24	7	6	11	24	37	−13	50	
12	Aubagne	24	6	7	11	38	51	−13	49	
13	Aix-les-Bains (R)	24	6	7	11	27	36	−9	49	Relegation to Division d'Honneur
14	Arles (res) (Note: Arles were dissolved during the season, and their record thus expunged.) (X)	0	0	0	0	0	0	0	0	Relegation to Division d'Honneur

Source: FFF.fr
Rules for classification: 1) points; 2) head-to-head results; 3) head-to-head goal difference; 4) goal difference; 5) number of goals scored; 6) fair play points; 7) draw
(C) Champions; (P) Promoted; (R) Relegated; (X) Record expunged due to dissolution.
Notes:

Group E
Pos	Team	Pld	W	D	L	GF	GA	GD	Pts	Promotion or relegation
1	Andrézieux (C)	26	17	4	5	48	26	+22	81	Promotion to CFA
2	Saint-Priest	26	13	7	6	36	20	+16	72	
3	Pontarlier	26	11	10	5	31	22	+9	69	
4	Bourgoin-Jallieu	26	12	5	9	34	34	0	67	
5	Racing Besançon	26	11	6	9	33	34	−1	65	
6	Gueugnon	26	9	7	10	29	28	+1	60	
7	Saint-Étienne (res)	26	8	9	9	33	32	+1	59	
8	Dijon (res)	26	10	3	13	29	33	−4	59	
9	Clermont (res)	26	7	11	8	45	36	+9	58	
10	Besançon	26	7	10	9	34	37	−3	57	
11	Selongey	26	8	7	11	29	36	−7	57	
12	Cournon	26	7	7	12	32	44	−12	54	
13	Thiers (R)	26	5	10	11	32	38	−6	51	Relegation to Division d'Honneur
14	Sens (R)	26	6	6	14	29	54	−25	50	Relegation to Division d'Honneur

Source: FFF.fr
Rules for classification: 1) points; 2) head-to-head results; 3) head-to-head goal difference; 4) goal difference; 5) number of goals scored; 6) fair play points; 7) draw
(C) Champions; (R) Relegated

Group F
Pos	Team	Pld	W	D	L	GF	GA	GD	Pts	Promotion or relegation
1	Reims (res) (C)	26	16	8	2	66	26	+40	82	Promotion to CFA
2	Raon-l'Étape (P)	26	14	4	8	60	37	+23	72	Promotion to CFA
3	Sarreguemines	26	13	5	8	42	37	+5	70	
4	Nancy (res)	26	12	4	10	46	40	+6	66	
5	Metz (res) (Note: Metz reserves were penalised for fielding a suspended player in the game against Strasbourg reserves on 2 April 2016. The game originally ended in a 4–2 victory for Metz reserves. Strasbourg reserves were awarded a 3–0 victory, and the point due to Metz reserves in defeat was withheld.)	26	11	7	8	59	54	+5	65	
6	Schiltigheim	26	9	9	8	37	33	+4	62	
7	Illzach	26	10	5	11	41	44	−3	61	
8	Strasbourg (res)	26	10	4	12	46	46	0	60	
9	Haguenau	26	7	12	7	34	35	−1	59	
10	Pagny-sur-Moselle (Note: Pagny-sur-Moselle were penalised for fielding a suspended player in the game against Schiltigheim on 20 March 2016. The game ended in a 0-5 defeat for Pagny-sur-Moselle. The result stood, and the point due to Pagny-sur-Moselle in defeat was withheld.)	26	8	9	9	26	38	−12	58	
11	Forbach	26	7	10	9	35	44	−9	57	
12	Biesheim	26	6	10	10	38	50	−12	54	
13	Épernay (R)	26	6	6	14	31	44	−13	50	Relegation to Division d'Honneur
14	Thaon (Note: Thaon were penalised for a technical infringement in the game against Nancy reserves on 9 April 2016. The game originally ended in a 2–0 victory for Nancy reserves. Nancy reserves were awarded a 3–0 victory, and the point due to Thaon in defeat was withheld.) (R)	26	4	5	17	25	58	−33	42	Relegation to Division d'Honneur

Source: FFF.fr
Rules for classification: 1) points; 2) head-to-head results; 3) head-to-head goal difference; 4) goal difference; 5) number of goals scored; 6) fair play points; 7) draw
(C) Champions; (P) Promoted; (R) Relegated
Notes:

Group G
Pos	Team	Pld	W	D	L	GF	GA	GD	Pts	Promotion or relegation
1	Lille (res) (C)	26	14	8	4	45	26	+19	76	Promotion to CFA
2	Lusitanos St-Maur (P)	26	14	8	4	45	28	+17	76	Promotion to CFA
3	Grande-Synthe	26	14	5	7	45	31	+14	73	
4	Noisy-le-Sec	26	13	6	7	45	34	+11	71	
5	Ivry	26	11	7	8	33	27	+6	66	
6	Boulogne (res)	26	10	8	8	42	34	+8	64	
7	Ailly-sur-Somme	26	10	7	9	27	29	−2	63	
8	Feignies (Note: Feignies were penalised for a technical infringement in the game against Noisy-le-Sec on 12 December 2015. The original scoreline was Noisy-le-Sec 1–2 Feignies. The opposition were awarded a 3–0 victory and the point due to Feignies in defeat was withheld.)	26	8	7	11	31	39	−8	56	
9	Saint-Quentin	26	8	5	13	37	44	−7	55	
10	Amiens (res) (Note: Amiens reserves have been penalised for incidents in two separate games. In both cases the opposition has been awarded a 3–0 victory, and the point due to Amiens in defeat has been withheld. In the game against Lille reserves on 3 October 2015, a dismissed player kicked the ball at the referee. The original scoreline was Amiens 0–2 Lille. In the game against Feignies on 7 November 2015, a suspended player was fielded. The original scoreline was Feignies 2–0 Amiens.)	26	8	7	11	31	38	−7	55	
11	Marck	26	6	10	10	25	31	−6	54	
12	Tourcoing	26	6	8	12	36	54	−18	52	
13	Aulnoye (R)	26	4	11	11	39	46	−7	49	Relegation to Division d'Honneur
14	Valenciennes (res) (R)	26	3	7	16	26	48	−22	42	Relegation to Division d'Honneur

Source: FFF.fr
Rules for classification: 1) points; 2) head-to-head results; 3) head-to-head goal difference; 4) goal difference; 5) number of goals scored; 6) fair play points; 7) draw
(C) Champions; (P) Promoted; (R) Relegated
Notes:

Group H
Pos	Team	Pld	W	D	L	GF	GA	GD	Pts	Promotion or relegation
1	Le Havre (res) (C)	26	15	8	3	52	25	+27	79	Promotion to CFA
2	Saint-Ouen-l'Aumône	26	12	7	7	28	16	+12	69	
3	Beauvais	26	12	5	9	26	23	+3	67	
4	Évreux	26	10	9	7	31	28	+3	65	
5	SM Caen (res)	26	10	9	7	44	42	+2	65	
6	Ste-Geneviève	26	10	7	9	39	27	+12	63	
7	Dreux	26	9	9	8	35	34	+1	62	
8	Sénart-Moissy	26	9	8	9	28	34	−6	61	
9	Oissel	26	10	5	11	37	37	0	61	
10	AC Ajaccio (res)	26	9	7	10	49	39	+10	60	
11	Paris FC (res)	26	8	9	9	27	33	−6	59	
12	UJAM Paris	26	9	5	12	30	38	−8	58	
13	ASPTT Caen (R)	26	6	10	10	31	44	−13	54	Relegation to Division d'Honneur
14	Gonfreville (Note: Gonfreville were penalised for technical infringements (fielding an ineligible player) in the games against Saint-Ouen-l'Aumône on 22 August 2015 (original scoreline Gonfreville 1-0 Saint-Oeuen-l'Aumône), against Évreux on 29 August 2015 (original scoreline Gonfreville 1-1 Évreux) and against ASPTT Caen on 5 September 2015 (original scoreline ASPTT Caen 2-1 Gonfreville). In all three cases, Gonfreville were awarded a 3-0 defeat, and the 1 point awarded for defeat was withheld.) (R)	26	1	6	19	19	56	−37	32	Relegation to Division d'Honneur

Source: FFF.fr
Rules for classification: 1) points; 2) head-to-head results; 3) head-to-head goal difference; 4) goal difference; 5) number of goals scored; 6) fair play points; 7) draw
(C) Champions; (R) Relegated

== Season outcomes ==
Outcomes below are provisional and subject to ratification by the FFF.

=== Champions and promotion ===
Rennes reserves, Chartres, ES Paulhan-Pézenas, Andrézieux, Reims reserves, Lille reserves and Le Havre reserves are promoted to CFA as champions of their respective groups.

Toulon, champions of Group D, are set to merge for next season with Toulon-Le Las, forming Sporting Club Toulon. The new club will play in CFA, with their reserves taking the place in CFA2. Accordingly, Annecy are promoted to CFA from Group D as best placed team.

Lusitanos St-Maur, Montpellier reserves, Raon-l'Étape and Granville are promoted, due to having the best record of the 2nd placed clubs against the top five teams eligible for promotion in their respective groups.

Reims reserves are Champions of 2015–16 Championnat de France Amateur 2, due to having the best record of the four promoted sides against the teams finishing in 2nd to 6th in their respective groups.

=== Relegation ===
Saint-Lô, Pontivy, Challans, Châteauroux reserves, Villenave, Blagnac, Aix-les-Bains, Sens, Thiers, Thaon, Épernay, Valenciennes reserves, Aulnoye, Gonfreville and ASPTT Caen are relegated to their regional Division d'Honneur as a result of finishing 13th or 14th in their respective groups.

Poiré-sur-Vie, Lannion, Tourcoing, Aubagne and Angoulême are relegated to their regional Division d'Honneur, due to having the worst record of the 12th placed teams against the teams finishing in 7th to 11th in their respective groups.

=== Reprieves ===
On 8 June, the FFF confirmed that Luçon would be administratively relegated from 2015–16 Championnat National to the regional Division d'Honneur. This resulted in a reprieve for Angoulême.

On 31 May, the FFF confirmed that Colmar would be administratively relegated, in addition to their sporting relegation from 2015–16 Championnat National. Colmar subsequently filed for bankruptcy, and will reform in the regional Division d'Honneur. This results in a reprieve for Aubagne.

On 21 June, it was confirmed that Moulins would be administratively relegated to the regional Division d'Honneur due to bankruptcy. This resulted in a reprieve for Tourcoing. Moulins eventually completed a merger with Yzeure, forming Moulins Yzeure Foot 03.

On 10 June, it was confirmed that Châtellerault would be administratively relegated to the regional Division d'Honneur due to financial issues. This resulted in a reprieve for Lannion.

If any administrative events lead to teams from outside the relegation places being relegated, already relegated teams will be reprieved in the following order:

==== 4th to 8th Best 12th Placed teams ====
Based on record against the teams finishing in 7th to 11th place in their respective groups.

Pos	Team	Pld	Pts	GD	
1	Angoulême	10	21	-4	Reprieved
2	Aubagne	10	21	-5	Reprieved
3	Tourcoing	10	20	-3	Reprieved
4	Lannion	10	20	-5	Reprieved
5	Poiré-sur-Vie	10	18	-6	

==== Best 13th Placed teams ====
Based on record against the teams finishing in 8th to 12th place in their respective groups.

Pos	Team	Pld	Pts	GD
1	Aix-les-Bains	10	26	5
2	Pontivy	10	23	-1
3	Blagnac	10	21	-2
4	ASPTT Caen	10	20	-5
5	Épernay	10	19	-3
6	Aulnoye	10	18	0
7	Thiers	10	17	-6
8	Châteauroux reserves	10	13	-18

== Top scorers ==
As of end of season

Rank	Player	Club	Goals
1	Said Habouch	ES Paulhan-Pézenas	26
2	Remy Oudin	Reims (res)	19
2	Cristian Ferreira Cabrera	Alès	19
2	Sekou Mangara	Andrézieux	19
5	Remy Baty	Bourgoin-Jallieu	17
5	Thomas Vauvy	Granville	17
7	Alhassane Traore	Grande-Synthe	15
7	Alimami Gory	Le Havre (res)	15
7	Abdoulaye Sané	Rennes (res)	15
7	Kévin Cardinale	Castanet	15
7	Edwin Maanane	Reims (res)	15
