= Neil Midgley =

Neil Midgley may refer to:

- Neil Midgley (referee), English football referee
- Neil Midgley (footballer), English footballer
