= Ludovic Gamboa =

French footballer (born 1986)

Personal information
- Date of birth: 14 January 1986 (age 40)
- Place of birth: Fontainebleau, France
- Height: 1.77 m (5 ft 10 in)
- Position: Wide midfielder

Team information
- Current team: Colomiers

Senior career*
Years	Team	Apps	(Gls)
2004–2007	Chamois Niortais	3	(1)
2007–2008	Martigues	4	(0)
2008	Fontenay-le-Comte	3	(0)
2008–2009	Compiègne	33	(11)
2009–2011	Reims	32	(7)
2011–2013	Laval	60	(12)
2013–2014	Angers	28	(3)
2013	Angers B	1	(0)
2014–2017	Le Havre	67	(2)
2014–2017	Le Havre B	10	(1)
2018	Créteil	15	(0)
2019–2020	Dunkerque	26	(2)
2020–2021	Gazélec Ajaccio	7	(0)
2021–2022	Rouen	10	(0)
2023–	Colomiers	10	(1)
- * Club domestic league appearances and goals as of 19:20, 4 October 2023 (UTC)

Ludovic Gamboa (born 14 January 1986) is a French professional footballer who plays as a wide midfielder for Championnat National 3 club Colomiers.

== Career ==
He started his career with Chamois Niortais, making his debut in the 3–0 away win over Romorantin on 14 January 2006. After coming on as a second-half substitute for Ronan Biger, Gamboa scored the third goal in the 89th minute. He made two more substitute appearances in the 2005–06 season, both of which were also Niort victories.

Gamboa joined Martigues on a free transfer in July 2007, but he failed to make an impact at the club; his four appearances all came from the substitutes' bench. He left Martigues in January 2008 and signed for Championnat de France amateur (CFA) side Fontenay-le-Comte. During the remainder of the 2007–08 season, Gamboa played three league matches. In the summer of 2008 he switched clubs again, joining CFA Group A club Compiègne.

After scoring 11 goals in 33 matches for Compiègne, Gamboa returned to the Championnat National when he signed for Reims ahead of the 2009–10 campaign. He scored on his debut for Reims in the 1–3 defeat away at Hyères on 7 August 2009. Gamboa ended the season with 6 goals in 17 appearances, helping Reims win promotion to Ligue 2 after only one season in the third tier. He played 32 league games in total for Reims during his two seasons with the club, scoring seven times. In May 2010, it was announced that he had signed for fellow Ligue 2 side Laval. During his first season at Laval, he scored three goals in 31 appearances as the team finished 16th in Ligue 2.

After six months with Créteil in 2018, in January 2019, Gamboa moved to Dunkerque. He played for the club until the summer 2020, where he moved to Gazélec Ajaccio. On 3 August 2021, Gamboa signed for Rouen. On 15 July 2022 the club confirmed, that Gamboa had left the club by mutual agreement. On 22 January 2023, Gamboa joined Colomiers.

== Personal life ==
Born in France, Gamboa holds French and Portuguese nationalities.
