= Emmet Friars =

Northern Irish footballer (born 1985)

Personal information
- Date of birth: 14 September 1985 (age 41)
- Place of birth: Derry, Northern Ireland
- Height: 1.83 m (6 ft 0 in)
- Position: Left-back

Youth career
- 2004–2005: Notts County

Senior career*
| Years | Team | Apps | (Gls) |
| 2005–2006 | Notts County | 14 | (1) |
| 2005 | → AFC Telford United (loan) | | |
| 2006–2007 | Tamworth | 21 | (0) |
| 2006–2007 | → Hinckley United (loan) | 4 | (0) |
| 2007–2010 | Newry City | 107 | (16) |
| 2010–2011 | Derry City | 34 | (3) |
| 2011–2013 | Dungannon Swifts | 44 | (5) |
| 2013–2014 | Portadown | 31 | (1) |
| 2014–2015 | Crusaders | 6 | (0) |
| 2015–2016 | Ballinamallard United | 34 | (1) |
| 2016–2017 | Ards | 32 | (5) |
| 2017–2018 | Ballymena United | 8 | (2) |
| 2018–2021 | Limavady United | 20 | (3) |
| Total | | 355 | (37) |

International career
| 2004–2006 | Northern Ireland U21 | 7 | (0) |

Managerial career
- 2023–2024: Dergview
- * Club domestic league appearances and goals

Emmet Friars (born 14 September 1985) is a Northern Irish football manager and former player.

== Club career ==
=== Notts County ===
Emmet began his career as a trainee with Notts County, but failed to establish himself in the first team. He made 14 appearances and scored one goal whilst at the club, but was released at the end of the 2005–06 season.

He spent the start of the 2005–06 season playing on loan for non-league team AFC Telford United in the Northern Premier League Premier Division.

On 23 December 2006, Friars was sent out on loan to Hinckley United for the remainder of the 2006–07 season.

In May 2007, Tamworth general manager Russell Moore confirmed that Friars would not be with the club for the 2007–08 season, and that the former Notts County defender had returned to Northern Ireland.

=== Newry City ===
Friars trained with Belfast team Cliftonville, where his brother Sean was then playing, but was not offered a contract.

He then joined Newry City. who Sean was signed for at the time. Friars became a vital part of the Newry team and quickly established himself in team as starting left-back. He was Newry City's Player of the Year for the season 2007–08. For the 2008–09 season, Friars switched to the centre-back role, becoming a defensive rock. He also became club captain for a short while following the departure of Richard Clarke. While at Newry City, Emmet was a firm favourite with the fans.

=== Derry City ===
In February 2010, Friars signed with hometown club Derry City, a team he had been linked with several times, and won the League of Ireland First Division title that season.

=== Dungannon Swifts ===
On 3 January 2012, Emmet moved on to join Dungannon Swifts, the same day that his brother Sean Friars joined the club.

=== Portadown ===
On 1 May 2013, Portadown announced they had signed Friars. His contract was terminated by mutual consent on 2 September 2014.

=== Crusaders ===
Just hours after his release from Portadown, he signed for Crusaders and made his debut on 13 September against old club Dungannon Swifts.

=== Ballinamallard ===
On 29 July 2015, it was announced that Friars would join Ballinamallard United on loan until the end of the season. After Friars was obliged to miss Ballinamallard's first encounter against his parent club on 15 August, and before the closure of the registration window on 2 September, Friars transferred to Ballinamallard permanently.

=== Ards ===
In the summer of 2016, it was announced that Friars would be joining Niall Currie's Ards.

== International career ==
Friars won seven caps for Northern Ireland Under-21s between 2004 and 2006.
