= ES Paulhan-Pézenas =

French football club

Étoile Sportive Paulhanaise
- Full name: Étoile Sportive Paulhanaise
- Nickname(s): ESP
- Founded: 2012 (as ES Pau lhan-Pézenas); 2018 (as ES Paulhan-Pézenas Avenir)); 2022 (Étoile Sportive Paulhanaise)
- Ground: Stade des laures
- Capacity: 500
- President: Thierry Perez
- Manager: 𝐉𝐮𝐥𝐢𝐞𝐧 𝐏𝐨𝐮𝐞𝐲𝐬
- League: Départemental 1 Occitanie
- 2022–23: Départemental 1 Occitanie, Hérault 1st
Home colours	Away colours

Étoile Sportive Paulhanaise is a football club based in Paulhan, France. The team plays at Stade des laures in Paulhan, and as of the 2022–23 season, competes in the Départemental 1 Occitanie, the tenth tier in the French football league system.

== History ==
The merger of Etoile Sportive Paulhanaise and AS Pézenas Tourbes to form Etoile Sportive Paulhan-Pézenas was announced on 6 June 2012. Former chairman of AS Pézenas Tourbes, Stéphane Mouton, took control of the new club, with Pascal Dagany appointed coach. The club entered the Division d'Honneur in the Languedoc-Roussillon region for the 2012–13 season. Following a good initial campaign, they finished second in the league, by one point.

After finishing third in the 2013–14 season, the club won the Division d'Honneur, and promotion to Championnat de France Amateur 2 in the 2014–15 season, on goal average having finished level on points with AF Lozère.

Paulhan-Pézenas finished top of its CFA 2 group, gaining promotion to the Championnat de France Amateur. The club narrowly avoided relegation from the 2016–17 Championnat de France Amateur, after finishing in the relegation places but gaining a reprieve due to administrative decisions affecting other clubs.

In 2018, Paulhan-Pézenas was relegated by finishing bottom of its Championnat National 2 group, and given a further administrative relegation of two divisions due to financial non-compliance. The club was eventually liquidated and reformed as Etoile Sportive Paulhan-Pézenas Avenir, playing in the Départemental 2 Occitanie as of the 2018–19 season.

== Honours ==
- Championnat de France Amateur 2 : Group winner 2016
- Champion DH Languedoc-Roussillon : 2015
