= Cambridge City F.C. =

Association football club in England

Coordinates: 52°08′00″N 0°10′25″E

- Full name: Cambridge City Football Club
- Nickname: The Lilywhites
- Founded: 28 August 1908; 118 years ago, as Cambridge Town
- Ground: Sawston Community Stadium, Sawston
- Capacity: 3,000
- Chairman: Kevin Satchell
- Manager: Michael Spillane
- League: Isthmian League North Division
- 2025–26: Isthmian League North Division, 12th of 22
- Website: cambridgecityfc.com
Home colours	Away colours

Cambridge City Football Club is a football club based in Sawston, Cambridgeshire, England, who currently play in the Isthmian League North Division. It was founded in 1908, as Cambridge Town Football Club, they played their home games at the City Ground in Cambridge, between 1922 and 2013, and changed their name in 1951 when Cambridge was granted city status. Following their departure from the City Ground in 2013, Cambridge groundshared at Histon's Bridge Road (2013–15, 2018–2023), and St Ives Town's Westwood Road (2015–18, 2023–2024) until their new Community Stadium at Sawston opened in November 2024.

Their home colours are white and black, and their nickname is ‘The Lilywhites’. Club honours include the Challenge International du Nord in 1912, and Southern League champions 1962–63.

== History ==
=== Formation and early years ===
The club was founded in 1908 as Cambridge Town F.C. (Cambridge had not been granted city status at that point) by the committee of the Cambridge St. Mary's club, and were committed to amateur sport. The club competed in the Southern Amateur League, developing a fierce rivalry with Ipswich Town that was evident both on and off the pitch. In 1912 they won the Challenge International du Nord in 1912, beating US Tourquennoise 4–1. The club were invited to join the newly formed Eastern Counties League in 1935, but declined the invitation and switched instead to the Spartan League.

The resumption of football after the Second World War saw Cambridge Town continuing in the Spartan League, winning the competition 3 times between 1945 and 1950, before joining the Athenian League for the 1950–51 season. Cambridge was formally granted city status in April, 1951. Both Cambridge Town and their neighbours Abbey United applied to change their name to Cambridge City. Cambridge Town's application was approved because it arrived first and therefore Abbey United changed their name to Cambridge United.

=== Southern League era ===
In 1958, Cambridge City Football Club underwent a pivotal transformation, transitioning from amateur to a fully professional club. In the same year, Cambridge City joined the Southern League Premier Division, aligning itself with other semi-professional and professional clubs seeking advancement toward the Football League. Professional status allowed the club to attract higher-caliber players and enhance its competitiveness. Additionally, they invested in improving their home ground, Milton Road, to meet league standards and accommodate rising attendances.

Under the professional structure, City developed a more disciplined training regime and expanded its administrative staff, signalling its intent to become a major force in the region. Although Cambridge City never achieved Football League membership, the 1958 professional shift established a foundation for future success, particularly during the 1960s when the club enjoyed strong Southern League campaigns. This move epitomized the ambitions of mid-century regional clubs striving to bridge the gap between non-league and professional football. The club went on to make five applications to join the Football League between 1959 and 1974, all of which were unsuccessful.

Cambridge United were elected into the Football League in 1970, and from that point City struggled to attract as many supporters to their games as their cross-city rivals – by the early 1980s, when United were enjoying a prolonged spell in the Second Division, City were attracting fewer than 200 supporters to each game. 1975–76 saw the second relegation in the club's history, into the Southern League's Division One North. They remained there until 1979–80, when a re-organisation of the league's structure, in order to become a feeder to the newly formed Football Conference, placed City in the Midland Division. A switch was made to the Southern Division in the 1982–83 season and this seemed to coincide with a turnaround in City's fortunes, and 1985–86 saw City win the division on goal difference and gain promotion back to the Premier Division. The late 1980s through to the early 1990s saw City competing at the top of the Premier Division.

=== Conference League era ===
City suffered a last day relegation at Atherstone United in May 1996, only to be reprieved. After a few seasons struggling at the wrong end of the table, including another reprieve from relegation in 1999, City's league form improved at just the right time and the club joined the Football Conference's newly formed South Division in 2004–05, embarking on a successful FA Cup run in the same season – following United's relegation from the League in 2005, the two Cambridge clubs were only one division apart. In May 2008, City were demoted from the Conference South, after their ground failed an FA inspection, to the Southern League Premier Division for the 2008–09 season. They were transferred into the Isthmian League Division One North for 2019–20, before switching to the Northern Premier League Midlands Division for the start of the 2021/22 season.

=== Financial challenges and stadium uncertainty ===
However, the club was encountering financial difficulties and the City Ground was sold to an Isle of Man company called Ross River, which was linked to Brian York, a man who had briefly been a director of the club. The board announced that it was to scrap the first team and transform the reserve team into a feeder for Cambridge United. This prompted the formation of a supporters' trust, who within weeks had taken over the running of the club. The club took Ross River to court, where it was ruled that the club were victims of fraudulent misrepresentation and bribery – the former chief executive Arthur Eastham having taken a £10,000 payment from Brian York, though the original deal was not overturned.

== Colours and badge ==
Cambridge City have traditionally played in white shirts, leading to the club being nicknamed "The Lilywhites", they currently play in white shirts, black shorts and black socks. Their current away strip is sky blue shirts, sky blue shorts and sky blue socks.

The club uses the city of Cambridge's coat of arms as a badge. It features a fortified bridge over a river.

== Stadium ==
The City Ground (also known as "Milton Road"), was Cambridge City's home ground from 29 April 1922 until 27 April 2013, located in the Chesterton area of the city, approximately 0.62 miles (1 km) north of the city centre. The original ground was one of the largest outside the Football League and was estimated to have a capacity in excess of 16,000, although the highest recorded attendance was 12,058 against Leytonstone on 11 February 1950. In the mid-1980s, part of the land the original ground stood on was sold for redevelopment, with a new ground built on the remaining land. The capacity of the second ground was approximately 3,000 with 700 seats.

The club was in a legal dispute with their landlords over the ground, which was sold by a previous board of directors for less than its market value. The High Court ruled that the club had been fraudulently misrepresented, and the club will receive 50% of the development profits on the site.

In February 2010, Cambridge City announced a three-year ground-share with Newmarket Town at their Cricket Field Road ground in Newmarket, approximately 13 miles away, for the 2010–2011 season. The ground was deemed to need work to bring it up to the required standard, and Cambridge City were to use this time to seek a permanent home closer to Cambridge. The groundshare was later deferred several times, and in April 2013, it was announced that the club had agreed a two-year groundshare with neighbours Histon, with City sharing Bridge Road from the beginning of the 2013–14 season. From 2015 to 2018 they groundshared with St Ives Town at their Westwood Road stadium. The Lilywhites revived their share with Histon at the start of the 2018–19 season until the 2022–23 season, before returning to Westwood Road again for a temporary short-term arrangement.

=== Stadiums List ===
Years	Ground
1908–1911	Purbeck Road
1911–1914	Hills Road Bridge Ground
1914–1915	Jesus College / Jesus Grove
1915–1918	no matches due to World War One
1919–1920	Jesus College / Jesus Grove — Parker's Piece — Grange Road —Corpus Christi — Magdelene College — St John's College — Amalgamation Ground — Queen's Road — Old County Ground — Romsey Town — Trinity New Ground
1920–1921	Magdelene College — Trinity New Ground — Grange Road — St John's College
1921–1922	Trinity New Ground — Town Ground (Milton Road)
1922–1984	Town Ground / City Ground (Milton Road)
1984–1985	all games played away during redevelopment of Milton Road
1985–2013	City Ground (Milton Road)
2013–2015	Bridge Road, Histon
2015–2018	Westwood Road, St Ives
2018–2023	Bridge Road, Histon
2023–2024	Westwood Road, St Ives
2024–Present	FWD-IP Community Stadium, Sawston

=== New stadium ===
In 2012, it was announced that the club's president, Len Satchell, had bought 35 acres of land in Sawston, a village six miles south of Cambridge, with a view to building the club a new 3,000-seat stadium, alongside community facilities for the surrounding area. Following public consultation and an appeal over the decision to grant planning permission, the new stadium plan was approved by the council in 2019. Construction began in January 2021 and the stadium opened in 2024. The stadium comprises a two-level main stand with seating for 500 spectators as well as hospitality facilities. At either end covered terraced stands provide additional capacity, and a similar terraced stand is located on the far side of the pitch. There is currently no segregation.

On 5 July 2025, a record crowd of 2,640 at the new stadium watched the Cambridge Derby between Cambridge City and Cambridge United. Aside from an FA Cup first round match against Wigan Athletic, a home match which was switched and held in Wigan, it was the largest home attendance for over 53 years, when Cambridge City played Chelmsford City at Milton Road in front of 2,686 supporters.

== Club squad ==
As of 2026–27

Manager: Michael Spillane

Note: Flags indicate national team as defined under FIFA eligibility rules; some limited exceptions apply. Players may hold more than one non-FIFA nationality.

No.	Pos.	Nation	Player
—	GK	ENG	James Philp
—	GK	ENG	Gene Ghag (on dual registration with Cockfosters)
—	DF	ENG	Jayden Randell (Captain)
—	DF	ENG	Ryan Fryatt
—	DF	ENG	Jermaine Anderson
—	DF	ENG	Charlie Lewis
—	DF	ENG	Reece Harris
—	DF	ENG	Charlie Norman
—	DF	ENG	Travis Dodsworth
—	DF	ENG	Jaiden Babalola
—	MF	ENG	Alex Warman
—	MF	ENG	Sam Carter

No.	Pos.	Nation	Player
—	MF	ENG	Lewis Hayes
—	MF	ENG	Danny Norton
—	MF	ENG	Ryan King
—	MF	ENG	Jack Thompson
—	MF	ENG	Sam Chaney
—	FW	ENG	Zak Head
—	FW	ENG	Freddie Croft
—	FW	ERI	Samrai Gebrai
—	FW	ENG	Freddie Hockey
—	FW	ENG	Charlie Royle
—	FW	ENG	Fletcher Toll

== Club personnel ==
Position	Name
Chairman	Kevin Satchell
Vice-Chairman	Ken Anderson
General Manager	Alice Dewey
Financial Director	Sid Cullum
Ladies & Girls Director	Eddie New
Supporters Trust Director	Steve Plumb
Youth Development Director	Neil Midgley
Media & Communications Director	Philip Saich
Equality & Diversity Director	Roger de Ste Croix
Club Secretary	Andy Dewey
Club Welfare Officer	Kate Perring
Girls Section & Welfare Officer	Clare New
Club Historian	Neil Harvey

== Honours ==
- Southern League
  - Winners: 1962–63
- Southern League Southern Division
  - Winners: 1985–86
- Southern League Cup
  - Winners: 2009–10
- Spartan League
  - Winners: 1945–46 (Eastern Division), 1947–48, 1948–49
- East Anglian League
  - Winners: 1939–40, 1940–41, 1941–42, 1942–43, 1944–45
- East Anglian Cup
  - Winners: 1923–24, 1927–28, 1930–31, 1942–43, 1943–44, 1945–46, 1947–48, 1959–60, 1964–65, 1975–76
- Amateur Football Alliance Senior Cup
  - Winners: 1946–47, 1947–48 (Shared), 1948–49, 1949–50
- Bury & District Football League
  - Winners:1909–10, 1910–11, 1912–13, 1919–20
- Cambridgeshire Invitation Cup
  - Winners (17): 1950–51, 1976–77, 1978–79, 1983–84, 1985–86, 1988–89, 1989–90, 1992–93, 1999–00, 2002–03, 2006–07, 2007–08, 2008–09, 2014–15, 2016–17, 2023–24, 2025-26.
- Cambridgeshire Professional Cup
  - Winners: 1960–61, 1961–62, 1962–63, 1963–64, 1970–71, 2007–08, 2010–11, 2011–12, 2016–17
- Amateur Football Alliance Senior Cup
  - Winners: 1930–31, 1946–47, 1947–48, 1948–49, 1949–50
- Southern Amateur Football League
  - Winners: 1920–21, 1927–28, 1928–29, 1930–31, 1931–32
- Challenge International du Nord
  - Winners: 1912
- Suffolk Senior Cup
  - Winners: 1909–10
- Addenbrookes Hospital Cup
  - Winners: 1939–40, 1941–42, 1942–43, 1943–44, 1944–45, 1945–46, 1947–48, 1950–51 (Shared), 1951–52 (Shared), 1955–56, 1956–57, 1958–59,
- Thetford Hospital Cup
  - Winners: 1924–25, 1927–28, 1928–29, 1929–30, 1933–34, 1934–35, 1935–36
- Fenland Cup
  - Winners: 1964–65
- Eastern Professional Floodlit Cup
  - Winners:1965–66, 1972–73
- Hunts premier Cup
  - Winners: 1961–62, 1962–63, 1964–65

== Records ==
- Highest Level League
  - 1st in 1962–63 Southern League (Prior to English football league system)
  - 2nd in 2004–05 Conference South (During English football league system)
- FA Cup
  - Second Round: 2004–05
- FA Trophy
  - Fifth Round: 2004–05 (Round 16)
  - Third Round: 2005–06 (Round 16)
- FA Amateur Cup
  - Semi-final: 1927–28
- Record attendance: 12,058 vs Leytonstone, FA Amateur Cup first round, 1949–50
- Record transfer fee received: £30,000 from Millwall for Neil Harris, 1998
- Record transfer fee paid: £8,000 to Rushden & Diamonds for Paul Coe, 1994

== Chairmen of Cambridge City FC ==
Cambridge City FC's chairmen since being professional football club are as follows:

- Harold Ridgeon (1958–1970)
- Jack Ginn (1970–1974)
- Jack Galer (1974–1976)
- Laurie Boost (1976–1977)
- Don Few (1977–1987)
- Freddie Segrave (1987) died
- Dennis Rolph (1987–2003)
- Kevin Satchell (2006–present)

== Managerial History ==
Cambridge City FC become a professional football club in 1958. Before that, teams were selected by the Club Committee.

Period	Manager
April 1958 — March 1961	Jack White
March 1961 — March 1962	Oscar Hold
March 1962 — February 1964	Frank Cruickshank
February 1964 — April 1965	Tommy Dawson
May 1965 — May 1967	Tony Marchi
June 1967 — April 1968	Roy Kirk
April 1968 — May 1968	Tommy Dawson
May 1968 — April 1974	Tommy Bickerstaff
May 1974 — March 1975	Jim Barrett
March 1975	Malcolm Keenan (interim manager)
March 1975 — December 1975	Bill Coldwell
December 1975 — May 1977	Roy Johnson
June 1977 — October 1978	Dave Worthington
October 1978 — February 1979	Eric Simper (interim manager)
February 1979 — June 1988	Bill Leivers
June 1988 — November 1996	Steve Fallon
November 1996 — December 1998	Graham Daniels
January 1999	Steve Holden & Phil Starbuck (joint interim managers)
January 1999 — November 2001	Chris Tovey
November 2001 — December 2001	Andy Kirkup (interim manager)
December 2001 — December 2002	David Batch
December 2002 — January 2003	Jeremy George (interim manager)
January 2003 — June 2016	Gary Roberts
July 2016	Neil Midgley (interim manager)
July 2016 — November 2016	Dan Gleeson
November 2016 — May 2024	Robbie Nightingale
May 2024 — September 2025	Jamie Cureton
September 2025 — October 2025	Shaun Sowden & Neil Midgley (joint interim managers)
October 2025 —	Michael Spillane

== Sponsorship ==
=== Kit suppliers and shirt sponsors ===
Period	Kit Manufacture	Shirt Sponsor
1992–1993	Umbro	AA Griggs / Chivers Hartley
1993–1994	Spectre	Chivers Hartley
1994–1996	—	Lancer
1996–1998	Vandanel	Lancer
1998–1999	Icis	Lancer
1999–2001	Vandanel	Lancer
2001–2004	Four2Four	Lancer
2004–2006	Uhlsport	York Construction
2006–2007	Macron	Roadtechs
2007–2008	Macron	Quite Great!
2008–2009	Macron	Anglia Traffic Management
2009–2010	Macron	None
2010–2011	Macron	Logic Scaffolding
2011–2012	Macron	The Shed
2012–2013	Macron	ProEdge Partners / bet365
2013–2014	Macron	ProEdge Partners
2014–2015	Macron	AIA Cambridge Ltd / Juicing Radio.com
2015–2017	Macron	Yorkshire Building Society / Cambridge Property Practice Ltd
2017–2018	Macron	Yorkshire Building Society / Greene King IPA
2018–2019	Macron	Posh Pup Ltd
2019–2021	Macron	Cambridge City Supporters Trust
2021–2022	Macron	MRBarrett Electrical / Pro-Serv Cambridge Ltd
2022–2023	Macron	Cambridge Flat Roofing / Greys Travel
2023–2025	Macron	IT for starter / Herbie's Bakes (home) / Accelerator Park (away)
2025–2026	Macron (home) / Adidas (away)	IT for starter / Herbie's Bakes (home) / Accelerator Park (away)
2026–2027	Adidas	IT for starter / Herbie's Bakes (home) / Accelerator Park (away)

== See also ==
- List of Cambridge City F.C. seasons
