= Patrice Maurel =

French footballer (born 1978)

Personal information
- Date of birth: 16 October 1978 (age 48)
- Place of birth: Cayenne, French Guiana, France
- Height: 1.69 m (5 ft 6 1/2 in)
- Position: Midfielder

Senior career*
Years	Team	Apps	(Gls)
1996–2001	Toulouse	5	(1)
1999–2000	→ Ipswich Town (loan)	0	(0)
2001–2004	Istres	70	(3)
2004–2–05	Rouen	18	(2)
2005–2007	Istres	60	(3)
2007–2008	Gueugnon	37	(5)
2008–2012	US Colomiers		
2012	Montauban FCTG		
Total		190	(14)

International career
1997	France U18		
- * Club domestic league appearances and goals

Patrice Maurel (born 16 October 1978) is a French former football midfielder.

== Career ==
Born in Cayenne, Maurel played professional football for Toulouse FC, FC Rouen, FC Istres and FC Gueugnon. He finished his career playing amateur football with US Colomiers Football and Montauban FCTG.

After winning the 1997 UEFA European Under-18 Championship with France, Maurel never managed to break into Toulouse's first team, and went on loan to Ipswich Town F.C. at age 21.

After he retired from playing, Maurel became a manager, leading US Colomiers Football.
