= Stuart Niven =

Scottish footballer

Personal information
- Date of birth: 24 December 1978 (age 47)
- Place of birth: Glasgow, Scotland
- Height: 5 ft 11 in (1.80 m)
- Position: Midfielder

Youth career
- 1995–1996: Ipswich Town

Senior career*
| Years | Team | Apps | (Gls) |
| 1996–2000 | Ipswich Town | 2 | (0) |
| 2000–2002 | Barnet | 59 | (3) |
- Carlisle United
- Cambridge City
- Spennymoor Town
- Tow Law Town
- Durham City
- Shildon
| Total | | 61 | (3) |

International career
| 1996–1997 | Scotland U18 | | |
- * Club domestic league appearances and goals

Stuart Niven (born 24 December 1978) is a Scottish former professional footballer who played as a midfielder.

== Career ==
Niven began his career in the Ipswich Town youth system. He made his senior debut for the club in a 3–1 win over Sheffield United on 14 September 1996. He made two appearances during the 1996–97 season.

He signed for Barnet in September 2000. He made 68 appearances for Barnet between 2000 and 2003.
