= Sean Friars =

Northern Irish footballer (born 1979)

Personal information
- Date of birth: 15 May 1979 (age 47)
- Place of birth: Derry, Northern Ireland
- Position: Forward

Team information
- Current team: Institute (assistant manager)

Youth career
- 199?–1995: Foyle Harps
- 1995–1998: Liverpool

Senior career*
Years	Team	Apps	(Gls)
1998–2001	Ipswich Town	1	(0)
2000	→ Portadown (loan)	?	(?)
2001–2002	Carlisle United	1	(0)
2002	Newry Town	4	(0)
2002–2004	Derry City	?	(?)
2004	→ Finn Harps (loan)	13	(1)
2004–2007	Cliftonville	60	(12)
2007	Limavady United	8	(2)
2007–2009	Newry City	38	(5)
2009–2010	Institute	28	(1)
2010–2011	Aileach	?	(?)
2012– 2014	Dungannon Swifts	21	(4)

International career
2001–2004	Northern Ireland U21	21	(0)
- * Club domestic league appearances and goals

Sean Friars (born 15 May 1979) is a football coach and former player. He is the assistant manager of NIFL Championship club Institute and works for the Depaul Foyle Haven Centre, which helps people afflicted by addiction issues and homelessness in Derry. As a former addict he is now fully focused on helping people struggling with some of the demons that wrecked his own football career.

His brother Emmet also played as a defender.

== Playing career ==
=== Early career ===
Friars was born in Derry, Northern Ireland. Prior to his move to Cliftonville, he played for Foyle Harps, Liverpool, Ipswich Town, Portadown, Newry Town, Derry City and Finn Harps.

Friars made only one appearance, as substitute, for Ipswich Town. He came on against Crewe Alexandra in a 2–1 home win at Portman Road.

In 2001, he had a short-term deal with Newry Town which expired in September.

In March 2004 a loan deal from Derry City to Finn Harps was announced. The left-sided midfielder, had been a member of Derry City's 2002 FAI Cup winning team. After returning from a loan spell with League of Ireland First Division club Finn Harps, it was announced in August 2004 that he had left Derry City by mutual agreement.

=== Cliftonville ===
Friars made his Cliftonville debut in August 2004 in a friendly match against Holywood During his first year at Cliftonville, Friars was included in the 2004–05 Irish League Team of the Year. Friars returned to Cliftonville from a spell at Limavady United where he spent the latter half of the 2006–07 season.

In October 2006 there was some doubt over his future with Cliftonville after he went absent from the club and was subsequently dropped from the squad for a number of matches.

He remained with Cliftonville and recently had an "outstanding" match in their second leg away win in the UEFA Intertoto Cup in July 2007.

=== Newry City ===
Friars sealed a return to Newry City in the summer of 2007 where he proved himself as a vital member of the team scoring 8 goals in his first 14 matches. His brother Emmett was also in the Newry City team.

=== Institute ===
In January 2009 Friars was transferred to Institute for an undisclosed fee, signing a 2-year contract.

=== Dungannon Swifts ===
On the same day as his brother Emmet Friars, 3 January 2012, Sean joined Dungannon Swifts.

== International career ==
Friars played for the Northern Ireland U21 national team, also captaining the side.

== Coaching career ==
=== Institute (academy) ===
Friars was appointed as Institute Under-20 team manager in the summer of 2016 and went on to win back to back Championship titles with the team.

=== Limavady United ===
Friars left his role at Institute to take on his first senior managerial job with Limavady United on 19 May 2018.

=== Institute return ===
On 3 May 2019, Friars returned to old club Institute as assistant manager, following relegation from the NIFL Championship with Limavady. He took on the role; initially, as assistant to John Quigg and maintained the position, following Quigg's resignation and the appointment of Sean Connor.

== Honours ==
Derry City

- FAI Cup: 2002
