= Edwin Maanane =

French footballer (born 1995)

Personal information
- Date of birth: 3 February 1995 (age 31)
- Place of birth: Saint-Priest-en-Jarez, France
- Height: 1.82 m (6 ft 0 in)
- Position: Forward

Team information
- Current team: Bourges

Youth career
- 2008–2013: Auxerre

Senior career*
Years	Team	Apps	(Gls)
2013	Auxerre II	14	(1)
2013–2016	Reims II	28	(15)
2015–2016	Reims	1	(0)
2016–2019	Grenoble	48	(20)
2019	→ Avranches (loan)	9	(3)
2019–2020	Rodez	6	(0)
2019–2020	Rodez II	4	(2)
2020–2022	Concarneau	19	(1)
2022–	Bourges	0	(0)
- * Club domestic league appearances and goals as of 13 May 2022

Edwin Maanane (born 3 February 1995) is a French professional footballer who plays for Bourges, as a forward.

== Professional career ==
Maanane was part of the AJ Auxerre youth academy, and moved to Stade de Reims in 2013. Maanane made his professional debut for Reims in a 1–1 Ligue 1 tie with OGC Nice on 12 December 2015. He joined Grenoble Foot 38 in 2016 and was the top scorer for the team in his debut season, scoring 19 goals. He helped the club win back-to-back promotions from the fourth tier to Ligue 2.

Maanane left Grenoble to join Avranches on loan in January 2019. On 17 June 2019, he joined Rodez AF in Ligue 2 on a free transfer.

In July 2020 Maanane returned to the Championnat National with US Concarneau, signing a two-year deal with an optional release at the end of the first year.

On 7 July 2022, Maanane joined Bourges.

== Personal life ==
Born in France, Maanane is of Algerian descent.
