= Marco Holster =

Dutch footballer (b. 1971)

Personal information
- Date of birth: 4 December 1971 (age 54)
- Place of birth: Weesp, Netherlands
- Position: Midfielder

Senior career*
Years	Team	Apps	(Gls)
1990-1991	BFC (Bussum)		
1991-1993	Huizen		
1993-1995	AZ	79	(14)
1996-1998	Heracles	70	(11)
1998-2000	Ipswich Town	10	(0)
2000-2003	Go Ahead Eagles	92	(5)
2003-2006	DOVO		
2006-2009	Lienden		
2009-2013	VVA '71		
Total		251	(30)
- * Club domestic league appearances and goals

Marco Holster (born 4 December 1971 in the Netherlands) is a Dutch retired footballer who is last known to have worked as head coach of VVA Achterberg reserves in his home country in 2017.

== Career ==
Holster started his senior career with BFC (Bussum) in 1991. In 1998, he signed for Ipswich Town in the English Football League First Division, where he made twelve appearances without scoring. After that, he played for Dutch clubs Go Ahead Eagles, DOVO, Lienden and VVA Achterberg before retiring in 2013.
