= Neil Midgley (footballer) =

English footballer

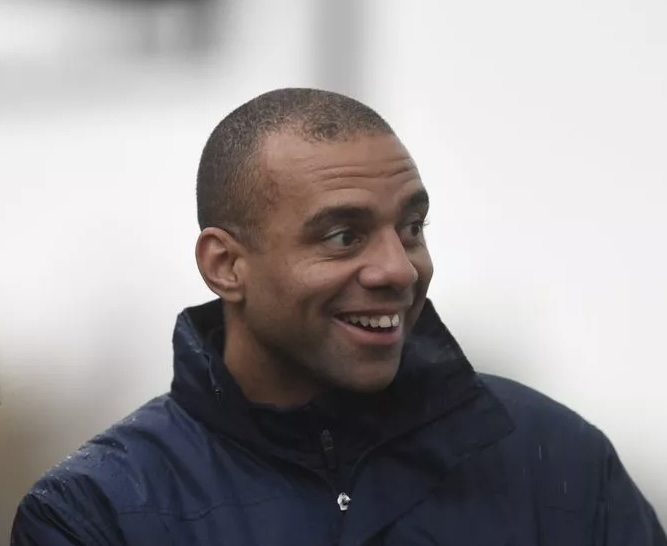

Personal information
- Full name: Neil Alan Midgley
- Date of birth: 21 October 1978 (age 48)
- Place of birth: Cambridge, England
- Position: Forward

Senior career*
Years	Team	Apps	(Gls)
1997–2001	Ipswich Town	4	(1)
1999	→ Luton Town (loan)	10	(3)
2000	→ Kidderminster Harriers (loan)	5	(2)
2001–2003	Barnet	79	(14)
2003–2005	Canvey Island	64	(7)
2005–2007	Kettering Town	24	(7)
2007–2019	Cambridge City	225	(43)
Total		411	(77)

Managerial career
- 2016: Cambridge City (Player-Manager)
- * Club domestic league appearances and goals

Neil Alan Midgley (born 21 October 1978) is an English retired professional footballer. He played for various teams in the Football League.

Neil has been the Youth Director for Cambridge City FC since 2024.
