= Jean-Manuel Thetis =

French footballer (born 1971)

Manuel Thetis
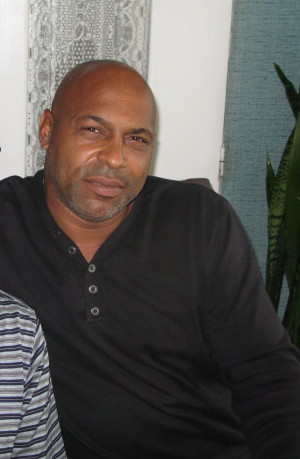
- Thetis in 2013

Personal information
- Date of birth: 5 November 1971 (age 55)
- Place of birth: Sarcelles, France
- Height: 1.91 m (6 ft 3 in)
- Position: Defender

Senior career*
Years	Team	Apps	(Gls)
1989–1990	RC Paris	19	(1)
1990–1994	Montpellier	66	(2)
1994–1995	Marseille	22	(2)
1995–1997	Montpellier	30	(1)
1997–1998	Sevilla	12	(0)
1998–2001	Ipswich Town	46	(2)
2000	→ Wolverhampton Wanderers (loan)	3	(0)
2001	Sheffield United	1	(0)
Total		199	(8)

International career
1990–1993	France U21	22	(1)
- * Club domestic league appearances and goals

Jean-Manuel Thetis (born 5 November 1971) is a French former professional footballer who played as a defender. He made 116 appearances and scored 4 goals in Ligue 1 in the 1989–1997 period and played 22 matches and scored 2 goals for Marseille in Ligue 2 in the 1994–95 season. Thetis then went on to have a three-year spell at Ipswich Town. At Ipswich he scored important winners in two 1–0 league victories against Tranmere Rovers and West Bromwich Albion (a game in which he later got sent off). He also scored once for Ipswich in the League Cup against Luton Town. He then had a brief loan spell at Wolverhampton Wanderers in 2000, before joining Sheffield United in January 2001.

== Honours ==
Ipswich Town

- Football League First Division play-offs: 2000
