= US Colomiers Football =

French association football team

US Colomiers
- Full name: Union Sportive Colomiers Football
- Founded: 1932; 94 years ago
- Ground: Stade Bertrand Andrieux, Colomiers
- Chairman: Patrick Delacroix
- Manager: Patrice Maurel
- League: National 3 Group B
- 2022–23: National 3 Group H, 8th
- Website: www.colomiersfoot.fr
Home colours	Away colours

Union Sportive Colomiers Football, more commonly known as US Colomiers, is a French association football team founded in 1932. They are based in Colomiers, Haute-Garonne, France and play at the Stade Bertrand Andrieux in the town. They currently play in Championnat National 3.

== Current squad ==
As of 4 October 2023

Note: Flags indicate national team as defined under FIFA eligibility rules; some limited exceptions apply. Players may hold more than one non-FIFA nationality.

No.	Pos.	Nation	Player
—	GK	FRA	Maxence Courtès
—	GK	FRA	Samy Hadj Hamou
—	GK	FRA	Théo Maniscalco
—	DF	FRA	Mouctar Coumbassa
—	DF	FRA	Emile Dalouze
—	DF	FRA	Guy-Mel Lasme
—	DF	FRA	Memel Lasme
—	DF	FRA	Léo Lebon
—	DF	FRA	Salif Lebouath
—	DF	FRA	Pierre Legrand
—	DF	FRA	Kévin Léoni
—	DF	FRA	Valentin Miroux
—	DF	CMR	Ismaël Njikam
—	MF	FRA	Ylian Baptiste
—	MF	FRA	Ludovic Gamboa

No.	Pos.	Nation	Player
—	MF	FRA	Anis Hamaidia
—	MF	FRA	Kenny Mavuba
—	MF	FRA	Thibaut Métayer
—	MF	FRA	Illés Soudani
—	MF	GUI	Seïti Touré
—	MF	FRA	Brice Ventrice
—	MF	FRA	Maxence Villaescusa
—	FW	FRA	Paul Bonneau
—	FW	FRA	Hugo Danjou
—	FW	FRA	Enzo Fontaine
—	FW	FRA	Samuel Genty
—	FW	FRA	Marthy Guillossou
—	FW	FRA	Valentin Saforcada
—	FW	FRA	Noa Savignac

== Notable players ==
- (France) Dayann Methalie (youth)
- (France) Romain Perraud (youth)
