= 2000–01 Ipswich Town F.C. season =

Ipswich Town
2000–01 season
- Chairman: David Sheepshanks
- Manager: George Burley
- Stadium: Portman Road
- Premier League: 5th
- FA Cup: Fourth round
- League Cup: Semi-finals
- Top goalscorer: League: Marcus Stewart (19); All: Marcus Stewart (21)
- Highest home attendance: 25,004 (vs Manchester City, 7 May 2001, Premier League)
- Lowest home attendance: 13,008 (vs Millwall, 26 September 2000, League Cup)
- Average home league attendance: 22,524
Home colours	Away colours

The 2000–01 season was the 122nd season of competitive association football and fourth season in the Premier League played by Ipswich Town, an English football club based in Ipswich, Suffolk. Their third-place finish in the Football League First Division in 1999–2000 season and victory in the play-off finals secured Ipswich Town a place in the Premier League. The season covers the period from 1 July 2000 to 30 June 2001.

== Season summary ==
Tipped by many to go straight back down to Division One after winning promotion, Ipswich quickly wowed the Premiership with an unlikely challenge among the top six. For much of the season, it looked like they would finish in the top three and qualify for the European Cup for the first time in nearly 40 years. In the end, a 2–1 defeat at Charlton Athletic ended such hopes with two games left and they finished fifth, just four points adrift of second-placed Arsenal and qualified for the UEFA Cup for the first time since 1982. Manager George Burley was then voted "Manager of the Year" by his colleagues.

== First-team squad ==
Squad at end of season

Note: Flags indicate national team as defined under FIFA eligibility rules; some limited exceptions apply. Players may hold more than one non-FIFA nationality.

No.	Pos.	Nation	Player
1	GK	ENG	Richard Wright
2	DF	NED	Fabian Wilnis
3	DF	ENG	Jamie Clapham
4	DF	ENG	John McGreal
6	DF	ENG	Mark Venus
7	MF	NIR	Jim Magilton
8	MF	IRL	Matt Holland (captain)
10	FW	ENG	James Scowcroft
11	FW	ENG	Marcus Stewart
12	FW	ENG	Richard Naylor
14	MF	ENG	Jermaine Wright

No.	Pos.	Nation	Player
15	DF	ENG	John Scales
16	DF	ENG	Gary Croft
19	DF	ENG	Titus Bramble
21	GK	IRL	Keith Branagan
30	MF	NED	Martijn Reuser
32	DF	ISL	Hermann Hreiðarsson
33	DF	SVN	Amir Karić
34	FW	ENG	Alun Armstrong
35	FW	SCO	Mark Burchill (on loan from Celtic)
36	DF	ENG	Chris Makin

=== Left club during season ===
Note: Flags indicate national team as defined under FIFA eligibility rules; some limited exceptions apply. Players may hold more than one non-FIFA nationality.

No.	Pos.	Nation	Player
9	FW	JAM	David Johnson (to Nottingham Forest)
17	DF	ENG	Wayne Brown (on loan to Queens Park Rangers)
18	DF	FRA	Jean-Manuel Thetis (released)

No.	Pos.	Nation	Player
22	MF	SCO	Stuart Niven (to Barnet)
24	FW	ENG	Neil Midgley (to Barnet)

=== Reserve squad ===
Note: Flags indicate national team as defined under FIFA eligibility rules; some limited exceptions apply. Players may hold more than one non-FIFA nationality.

No.	Pos.	Nation	Player
13	GK	ENG	Mike Salmon
20	FW	ENG	Richard Logan
23	FW	NIR	Sean Friars
25	MF	ENG	Ashley Nicholls
26	GK	ENG	James Pullen
27	FW	NED	Guillermo Graaven
28	MF	NED	Nabil Abidallah

No.	Pos.	Nation	Player
29	DF	RSA	Justin Miller
31	DF	SCO	Stephen Moffatt
—	DF	ENG	Lee Beevers
—	MF	ENG	Matt Bloomfield
—	MF	ENG	Matthew Robinson
—	MF	ENG	Ian Westlake
—	FW	ENG	Darren Bent

== Pre-season ==
Ipswich spent time on a pre-season tour of the Baltic states during the club's pre-season preparations for the 2000–01 season, playing friendly matches against Finnish side Vaasan Palloseura, Estonian side FC Flora and Latvian side Riga.

21 July 2000 Friendly	Vaasan Palloseura	0–2	Ipswich Town
		Report	Johnson (x2)

23 July 2000 Friendly	FC Flora	0–2	Ipswich Town
		Report	Reuser 42'; Croft 51'

25 July 2000 Friendly	Riga	0–3	Ipswich Town
		Report	Croft; Holland; Stewart

3 August 2000 Friendly	Leyton Orient	2–2	Ipswich Town
	Lockwood; Berkovic	Report	Johnson; Mowbray

5 August 2000 Friendly	Ipswich Town	2–1	AZ Alkmaar
	Johnson (x2)	Report	Bosman

12 August 2000 Friendly	Ipswich Town	1–1	Fiorentina
	Bramble	Report	Rossi

== Competitions ==
=== FA Premier League ===
==== League table ====
Pos	Team	Pld	W	D	L	GF	GA	GD	Pts	Qualification or relegation
3	Liverpool	38	20	9	9	71	39	+32	69	Qualification for the Champions League third qualifying round (Note: Since Liverpool won the League Cup and qualified for the Champions League, their UEFA Cup place went to fifth-placed Ipswich Town. Since both FA Cup finalists, Liverpool and Arsenal, qualified for the Champions League, the berth in the UEFA Cup went to sixth-placed Chelsea. Both Ipswich and Chelsea were the highest-ranked team not already qualified for a European competition.)
4	Leeds United	38	20	8	10	64	43	+21	68	Qualification for the UEFA Cup first round
5	Ipswich Town	38	20	6	12	57	42	+15	66	Qualification for the UEFA Cup first round
6	Chelsea	38	17	10	11	68	45	+23	61	Qualification for the UEFA Cup first round
7	Sunderland	38	15	12	11	46	41	+5	57	

Source: Premier League
Rules for classification: 1) points; 2) goal difference; 3) number of goals scored.
Notes:

Results summary

Overall								Home						Away					
Pld	W	D	L	GF	GA	GD	Pts	W	D	L	GF	GA	GD	W	D	L	GF	GA	GD
38	20	6	12	57	42	+15	66	11	5	3	31	15	+16	9	1	9	26	27	−1

Source: 2000-01 FA Premier League table

Results by round

Round	1	2	3	4	5	6	7	8	9	10	11	12	13	14	15	16	17	18	19	20	21	22	23	24	25	26	27	28	29	30	31	32	33	34	35	36	37	38
Ground	A	H	H	A	H	A	H	A	H	A	H	A	H	A	A	H	A	H	A	H	H	A	H	A	H	A	H	H	A	A	A	H	H	A	H	A	H	A
Result	L	D	W	L	L	W	D	W	D	W	W	L	W	W	W	L	W	W	L	D	W	L	W	L	L	L	W	W	L	W	W	D	W	W	W	L	W	D
Position	18	15	12	14	16	11	11	9	7	6	5	6	6	5	3	5	3	3	5	5	3	4	4	5	5	6	5	3	3	3	3	3	3	3	3	4	4	5

Source: 11v11.com: 2000–01 Ipswich Town results
A = Away; H = Home; W = Win; D = Draw; L = Loss; = Qualification for the 2001–02 Champions League first group stage; = Qualification for the 2001–02 Champions League third qualifying round; = Qualification for the 2001–02 UEFA Cup first round; = Qualification for the 2001 Intertoto Cup third round; = Relegation to the 2001–02 Football League First Division

==== Matches ====
Ipswich Town's season results Win Draw Loss Upcoming fixture

19 August 2000 1	Tottenham Hotspur	3–1	Ipswich Town	Haringey, Greater London
15:00 BST	Anderton 28' (pen.); Carr 29'; Ferdinand 81'	Report	Venus 8'	Stadium: White Hart Lane; Attendance: 36,148; Referee: Wiley

22 August 2000 2	Ipswich Town	1–1	Manchester United	Ipswich, Suffolk
19:45 BST	Wilnis 6'	Report	Beckham 39'	Stadium: Portman Road; Attendance: 22,007; Referee: J Winter

26 August 2000 3	Ipswich Town	1–0	Sunderland	Ipswich, Suffolk
15:00 BST	Bramble 52'	Report		Stadium: Portman Road; Attendance: 21,830; Referee: Poll

6 September 2000 4	Leicester City	2–1	Ipswich Town	Leicester, Leicestershire
19:45 BST	Akinbiyi 56'; Elliott 72'	Report	Magilton 87'	Stadium: Filbert Street; Attendance: 19,598; Referee: P Taylor

9 September 2000 5	Ipswich Town	1–2	Aston Villa	Ipswich, Suffolk
15:00 BST	Stewart 89'	Report	Hendrie 26'; Dublin 54'	Stadium: Portman Road; Attendance: 22,065; Referee: D'Urso

16 September 2000 6	Leeds United	1–2	Ipswich Town	Leeds, West Yorkshire
15:00 BST	Bowyer	Report	Scowcroft; J Wright	Stadium: Elland Road; Attendance: 35,552; Referee: M Halsey

23 September 2000 7	Ipswich Town	1–1	Arsenal	Ipswich, Suffolk
15:00 BST	Stewart 49'	Report	Bergkamp 83'	Stadium: Portman Road; Attendance: 22,030; Referee: P Durkin

30 September 2000 8	Everton	0–3	Ipswich Town	Liverpool, Merseyside
15:00 BST		Report	McGreal 19'; Stewart 49', 60'	Stadium: Goodison Park; Attendance: 32,597; Referee: J Winter

14 October 2000 9	Ipswich Town	1–1	West Ham United	Ipswich, Suffolk
15:00 BST	Stewart 5'	Report	Di Canio 72'	Stadium: Portman Road; Attendance: 22,243; Referee: N Barry

21 October 2000 10	Bradford City	0–2	Ipswich Town	Bradford, West Yorkshire
15:00 BST		Report	Petrescu 33' (o.g.); Clapham 88'	Stadium: Valley Parade; Attendance: 17,045; Referee: P Taylor

28 October 2000 11	Ipswich Town	2–1	Middlesbrough	Ipswich, Suffolk
15:00 BST	Naylor 25'; Venus 28'	Report	Gordon 68'	Stadium: Portman Road; Attendance: 21,771; Referee: N Barry

4 November 2000 12	Newcastle United	2–1	Ipswich Town	Newcastle upon Tyne, Tyne and Wear
15:00 GMT	Shearer 21', 66' (pen.)	Report	Stewart 12'	Stadium: St James' Park; Attendance: 50,922; Referee: Alan Wiley

11 November 2000 13	Ipswich Town	2–0	Charlton Athletic	Ipswich, Suffolk
15:00 GMT	Holland 80'; Stewart 84'	Report		Stadium: Portman Road; Attendance: 22,263; Referee: Steve Bennett

20 November 2000 14	Coventry City	0–1	Ipswich Town	Coventry, Warwickshire
		Report	Wilnis 90'	Stadium: Highfield Road; Attendance: 19,324; Referee: David Elleray

25 November 2000 15	Manchester City	2–3	Ipswich Town	Manchester, Greater Manchester
	Wanchope 71'; Howey 81'	Report	Stewart 9', 53'; Hreiðarsson 32'	Stadium: Maine Road; Attendance: 33,741; Referee: Mike Dean

2 December 2000 16	Ipswich Town	0–1	Derby County	Ipswich, Suffolk
		Report	Delap 28'	Stadium: Portman Road; Attendance: 22,003; Referee: Mark Halsey

10 December 2000 17	Liverpool	0–1	Ipswich Town	Liverpool, Merseyside
		Report	Stewart 45'	Stadium: Anfield; Attendance: 43,509; Referee: Alan Wiley

16 December 2000 18	Ipswich Town	3–1	Southampton	Ipswich, Suffolk
	Scowcroft 48'; Armstrong 90'; Bridge 51' (o.g.)	Report	Beattie 3'	Stadium: Portman Road; Attendance: 22,228; Referee: Barry Knight

23 December 2000 19	Manchester United	2–0	Ipswich Town	Manchester, Greater Manchester
	Solskjær 20', 23'	Report		Stadium: Old Trafford; Attendance: 67,597; Referee: Steve Bennett

26 December 2000 20	Ipswich Town	2–2	Chelsea	Ipswich, Suffolk
	Scowcroft 43'; Stewart 82'	Report	Guðjohnsen 8', 17'	Stadium: Portman Road; Attendance: 22,237; Referee: Jeff Winter

30 December 2000 21	Ipswich Town	3–0	Tottenham Hotspur	Ipswich, Suffolk
	Stewart 9'; Armstrong 62'; Clapham 88'	Report		Stadium: Portman Road; Attendance: 22,234; Referee: Matt Messias

1 January 2001 22	Sunderland	4–1	Ipswich Town	Sunderland, Tyne and Wear
	Arca 25'; Phillips 57'; Dichio 63'; Schwarz 88'		Stewart 5'	Stadium: Stadium of Light; Attendance: 46,053; Referee: Neale Barry

14 January 2001 23	Ipswich Town	2–0	Leicester City	Ipswich, Suffolk
	Stewart 80'; Scowcroft 90'	Report		Stadium: Portman Road; Attendance: 22,022; Referee: Mike Riley

20 January 2001 24	Chelsea	4–1	Ipswich	Fulham, Greater London
	Poyet 45', 65'; Wise 58'; Hasselbaink 73' (pen.)		Stewart 23'	Stadium: Stamford Bridge; Attendance: 34,948; Referee: Andy D' Urso

3 February 2001 25	Ipswich Town	1–2	Leeds United	Ipswich, Suffolk
	Venus 63'		Venus 28' (o.g.), Keane 41'	Stadium: Portman Road; Attendance: 22,015; Referee: Peter Jones

17 February 2001 26	Arsenal	1–0	Ipswich Town	Islington, Greater London
	Henry 67'	Report		Stadium: Highbury; Attendance: 38,011; Referee: Rob Harris

24 February 2001 27	Ipswich Town	2–0	Everton	Liverpool, Merseyside
	Holland 82'; Armstrong 84'	Report		Stadium: Goodison Park; Attendance: 22,220; Referee: Graham Poll

4 March 2001 28	Ipswich Town	3–1	Bradford City	Ipswich, Suffolk
	Reuser 59', 72'; Burchill 75'	Report	Carbone 27'	Stadium: Portman Road; Attendance: 21,820; Referee: Andy D' Urso

10 March 2001 29	Aston Villa	2–1	Ipswich Town	Birmingham, West Midlands
	Joachim 53', 71'	Report	Armstrong 25'	Stadium: Villa Park; Attendance: 28,216; Referee: Rob Styles

17 March 2001 30	West Ham United	0–1	Ipswich Town	Newham, Greater London
			Reuser 60'	Stadium: Boleyn Ground; Attendance: 26,046; Referee: Mike Dean

2 April 2001 31	Southampton	0–3	Ipswich Town	Southampton, Hampshire
		Report	Stewart 33', 68', 71' (pen.)	Stadium: The Dell; Attendance: 15,244; Referee: Alan Wiley

10 April 2001 32	Ipswich Town	1–1	Liverpool	Ipswich, Suffolk
	Armstrong 77'		Heskey 46'	Stadium: Portman Road; Attendance: 23,504; Referee: Steve Dunn

14 April 2001 33	Ipswich Town	1–0	Newcastle United	Ipswich, Suffolk
	Stewart 76' (pen.)	Report		Stadium: Portman Road; Attendance: 24,028; Referee: Mike Dean

16 April 2001 34	Middlesbrough	1–2	Ipswich Town	Middlesbrough, North Yorkshire
	Windass 38'	Report	Armstrong 46', 50'	Stadium: Riverside; Attendance: 34,294; Referee: Steve Bennett

21 April 2001 35	Ipswich Town	2–0	Coventry City	Ipswich, Suffolk
	Reuser 20'; J Wright 56'	Report		Stadium: Portman Road; Attendance: 24,612; Referee: Graham Barber

30 April 2001 36	Charlton Athletic	2–1	Ipswich Town	Greenwich, Greater London
	Svensson 12'; Rufus 57'	Report	Reuser 20'	Stadium: The Valley; Attendance: 20,043; Referee: Rob Styles

7 May 2001 37	Ipswich Town	2–1	Manchester City	Ipswich, Suffolk
	Holland 78'; Reuser 85'	Report	Goater 74'	Stadium: Portman Road; Attendance: 25,004; Referee: Steve Lodge

19 May 2001 38	Derby County	1–1	Ipswich Town	Derby, Derbyshire
	Christie 31'	Report	Naylor 46'	Stadium: Pride Park Stadium; Attendance: 33,239; Referee: Graham Poll

=== FA Cup ===
6 January 2001 Third round	Morecambe	0–3	Ipswich Town	Morecambe
15:00 GMT		Report	Stewart 14'; Armstrong 65'; J Wright 75'	Stadium: Christie Park; Attendance: 5,923; Referee: Uriah Rennie

27 January 2001 Fourth round	Sunderland	1–0	Ipswich Town	Sunderland, Tyne and Wear
15:00 GMT	Dichio 23'	Report		Stadium: Stadium of Light; Attendance: 33,626; Referee: Steve Bennett

=== Football League Cup ===
19 September 2000 Second round First leg	Millwall	2–0	Ipswich Town	Southwark, Greater London
19:45 BST	Ifill 36'; Cahill 79'	Report		Stadium: The Den; Attendance: 8,068; Referee: Rob Styles

26 September 2000 Second round Second leg	Ipswich Town	5–0 (a.e.t.) (5 – 2 agg.)	Millwall	Ipswich, Suffolk
19:45 BST	Johnson 75', 115'; Bramble 87'; Holland 91'; Magilton 105'	Report	Dolan (red card) 28'; Reid (red card) 73'	Stadium: Portman Road; Attendance: 13,008; Referee: A Hall

1 November 2000 Third round	Arsenal	1–2	Ipswich Town	Islington, Greater London
19:45 GMT	Stepanovs 44'	Report	Clapham 2'; Scowcroft 90'	Stadium: Highbury; Attendance: 26,105; Referee: Jeff Winter

28 November 2000 Fourth round	Ipswich Town	2–1	Coventry City	Ipswich, Suffolk
19:45 BST	Bramble 5'; Johnson 65'	Report	Bellamy 54' (pen.)	Stadium: Portman Road; Attendance: 19,563; Referee: Paul Durkin

19 December 2000 Fifth round	Manchester City	1–2 (a.e.t.)	Ipswich Town	Manchester
19:45 BST	Goater 10'	Report	Holland 60'; Venus 109'	Stadium: Maine Road; Attendance: 31,252; Referee: Graham Poll

9 January 2001 Semi-finals; First leg	Ipswich Town	1–0	Birmingham City	Ipswich, Suffolk
19:45 BST	Stewart 45' (pen.)	Report		Stadium: Portman Road; Attendance: 21,684; Referee: C Wilkes

31 January 2001 Semi-finals; Second leg	Birmingham City	4–1 (a.e.t.) (4 – 2 agg.)	Ipswich Town	Birmingham
19:45 BST	Horsfield 43' 55'; Grainger 103'; Johnson 116'	Report	Scowcroft 56'	Stadium: St Andrew's; Attendance: 28,624; Referee: Jeff Winter

== Transfers ==
=== Transfers in ===
Date	Pos	Name	From	Fee	Ref
23 June 2000	MF	(Netherlands) Martijn Reuser	(Netherlands) Ajax	£1,000,000	
5 July 2000	DF	(England) John Scales	(England) Tottenham Hotspur	Free transfer	
8 July 2000	MF	(Netherlands) Nabil Abidallah	(Netherlands) Ajax	Free transfer	
8 July 2000	FW	(Netherlands) Guillermo Graaven	(Netherlands) Ajax	Free transfer	
18 August 2000	DF	(Iceland) Hermann Hreiðarsson	(England) Wimbledon	£4,000,000	
18 September 2000	DF	(Slovenia) Amir Karić	(Slovenia) NK Maribor	£700,000	
7 December 2000	FW	(England) Alun Armstrong	(England) Middlesbrough	£500,000	
7 March 2001	DF	(England) Chris Makin	(England) Sunderland	£1,250,000	

=== Loans in ===
Date from	Pos	Name	From	Date until	Ref
20 February 2001	FW	(Scotland) Mark Burchill	(Scotland) Celtic	30 June 2001	

=== Transfers out ===
Date	Pos	Name	To	Fee	Ref
1 June 2000	MF	(Netherlands) Marco Holster	(Netherlands) Go Ahead Eagles	Free transfer	
1 July 2000	MF	(England) John Kennedy	Free agent	Released	
23 July 2000	MF	(England) Mick Stockwell	(England) Colchester United	Free transfer	
22 August 2000	FW	(Sweden) Jonas Axeldal	(England) Cambridge United	Free transfer	
29 September 2000	MF	(Scotland) Stuart Niven	(England) Barnet	Free transfer	
4 January 2001	DF	(France) Jean-Manuel Thetis	Free agent	Mutual consent	
12 January 2001	FW	(Jamaica) David Johnson	(England) Nottingham Forest	£3,500,000	
22 March 2001	MF	(England) Neil Midgley	(England) Barnet	Free transfer	

=== Loans out ===
Date from	Pos	Name	From	Date until	Ref
25 August 2000	DF	(France) Jean-Manuel Thetis	(England) Wolverhampton Wanderers	12 September 2000	
25 January 2001	FW	(England) Richard Logan	(England) Cambridge United	25 February 2001	
9 February 2001	DF	(Scotland) Steven Moffat	(England) Chelmsford City	7 March 2001	
2 March 2001	DF	(Slovenia) Amir Karić	(England) Crystal Palace	15 March 2001	
20 March 2001	DF	(England) Wayne Brown	(England) Queens Park Rangers	7 May 2001	

Transfers in: ▼£6,950,000
Transfers out: ▲£3,500,000
Total spending: ▼£3,450,000

== Squad statistics ==
All statistics updated as of end of season

=== Appearances and goals ===
No.	Pos	Nat	Player	Total		FA Premier League		FA Cup		Football League Cup	
No.	Pos	Nat	Player	Apps	Goals	Apps	Goals	Apps	Goals	Apps	Goals
1	GK	(England) ENG	Richard Wright	44	0	36	0	2	0	6	0
2	DF	(Netherlands) NED	Fabian Wilnis	37	2	27+2	2	2	0	5+1	0
4	DF	(England) ENG	John McGreal	34	1	25+3	1	1	0	5	0
19	DF	(England) ENG	Titus Bramble	33	3	23+3	1	2	0	4+1	2
32	DF	(Iceland) ISL	Hermann Hreiðarsson	45	1	35+1	1	2	0	7	0
3	DF	(England) ENG	Jamie Clapham	44	3	28+7	2	0+2	0	7	1
7	MF	(Northern Ireland) NIR	Jim Magilton	41	2	32+1	1	1+1	0	6	1
8	MF	(Republic of Ireland) IRL	Matt Holland	47	5	38	3	2	0	6+1	2
14	MF	(England) ENG	Jermaine Wright	46	3	35+2	2	2	1	5+2	0
11	FW	(England) ENG	Marcus Stewart	41	21	33+1	19	2	1	3+2	1
10	FW	(England) ENG	James Scowcroft	43	6	22+12	4	1+1	0	5+2	2
21	GK	(Republic of Ireland) IRL	Keith Branagan	3	0	2	0	0	0	1	0
6	DF	(England) ENG	Mark Venus	29	4	23+2	3	1	0	3	1
34	FW	(England) ENG	Alun Armstrong	23	8	15+6	7	2	1	0	0
30	MF	(Netherlands) NED	Martijn Reuser	34	6	13+13	6	1	0	3+4	0
36	DF	(England) ENG	Chris Makin	10	0	10	0	0	0	0	0
16	DF	(England) ENG	Gary Croft	13	0	6+2	0	1	0	3+1	0
12	FW	(England) ENG	Richard Naylor	16	2	5+8	2	0+1	0	1+1	0
35	FW	(Scotland) SCO	Mark Burchill	7	1	2+5	1	0	0	0	0
15	DF	(England) ENG	John Scales	4	0	2	0	2	0	0	0
33	DF	(Slovenia) SVN	Amir Karić	3	0	0	0	0	0	0+3	0
28	MF	(Netherlands) NED	Nabil Abidallah	2	0	0+2	0	0	0	0	0
20	FW	(England) ENG	Richard Logan	1	0	0	0	0+1	0	0	0
Players transferred/loaned out during the season
9	FW	(Jamaica) JAM	David Johnson	19	3	6+8	0	0	0	5	3
17	DF	(England) ENG	Wayne Brown	4	0	0+4	0	0	0	0	0

- Source: Competitions

=== Goalscorers ===
No.	Pos	Nat	Player	Premier League	FA Cup	League Cup	Total
11	FW	(England)	Marcus Stewart	19	1	1	21
34	FW	(England)	Alun Armstrong	7	1	0	8
10	FW	(England)	James Scowcroft	4	0	2	6
30	MF	(Netherlands)	Martijn Reuser	6	0	0	6
8	MF	(Republic of Ireland)	Matt Holland	3	0	2	5
6	DF	(England)	Mark Venus	3	0	1	4
3	MF	(England)	Jamie Clapham	2	0	1	3
9	FW	(Jamaica)	David Johnson	0	0	3	3
14	MF	(England)	Jermaine Wright	2	1	0	3
19	DF	(England)	Titus Bramble	1	0	2	3
2	DF	(Netherlands)	Fabian Wilnis	2	0	0	2
7	MF	(Northern Ireland)	Jim Magilton	1	0	1	2
12	FW	(England)	Richard Naylor	2	0	0	2
4	DF	(England)	John McGreal	1	0	0	1
32	DF	(Iceland)	Hermann Hreiðarsson	1	0	0	1
35	FW	(Scotland)	Mark Burchill	1	0	0	1
Own goal				2	0	0	2
Total				57	3	13	73

=== Clean sheets ===
Number	Nation	Name	Premier League	FA Cup	League Cup	Total
1	(England)	Richard Wright	12	1	2	15
21	(Republic of Ireland)	Keith Branagan	1	0	0	1
Total			13	1	2	16

=== Disciplinary record ===
No.	Pos.	Name	Premier League		FA Cup		League Cup		Total	
No.	Pos.	Name	Booked	Sent off (straight red)	Booked	Sent off (straight red)	Booked	Sent off (straight red)	Booked	Sent off (straight red)
2	DF	(Netherlands) Fabian Wilnis	6	0	0	0	0	0	6	0
3	MF	(England) Jamie Clapham	2	0	0	0	0	0	2	0
4	DF	(England) John McGreal	1	1	1	0	1	0	3	1
6	DF	(England) Mark Venus	5	0	0	0	0	0	5	0
7	MF	(Northern Ireland) Jim Magilton	1	0	0	0	1	0	2	0
11	FW	(England) Marcus Stewart	2	1	0	0	0	0	2	1
12	FW	(England) Richard Naylor	0	0	0	0	1	0	1	0
14	MF	(England) Jermaine Wright	1	0	0	0	0	0	1	0
15	DF	(England) John Scales	1	0	0	0	0	0	1	0
16	DF	(England) Gary Croft	1	0	0	0	1	0	2	0
19	DF	(England) Titus Bramble	6	0	1	0	1	0	8	0
30	MF	(Netherlands) Martijn Reuser	1	0	0	0	0	0	1	0
32	DF	(Iceland) Hermann Hreiðarsson	3	0	0	0	0	0	3	0
33	DF	(Slovenia) Amir Karić	0	0	0	0	1	0	1	0
36	DF	(England) Chris Makin	1	0	0	0	0	0	1	0
Total			31	2	2	0	6	0	39	2

=== Starting 11 ===
Considering starts in all competitions

No.	Pos.	Nat.	Name	MS	Notes
1	GK	(England)	Richard Wright	44	
2	RB	(Netherlands)	Fabian Wilnis	34	
19	CB	(England)	Titus Bramble	29	Mark Venus has 27 starts
4	CB	(England)	John McGreal	31	
32	LB	(Iceland)	Hermann Hreiðarsson	44	
14	RM	(England)	Jermaine Wright	42	
8	CM	(Republic of Ireland)	Matt Holland	46	
7	CM	(Northern Ireland)	Jim Magilton	39	
3	LM	(England)	Jamie Clapham	35	
11	CF	(England)	Marcus Stewart	38	
10	CF	(England)	James Scowcroft	28	

4–4–2 Formation

== Awards ==
=== Player of the Year ===
Player	Ref
(England) Marcus Stewart	

=== Premier League Manager of the Month ===
Month	Player	Ref
November	(Scotland) George Burley	

=== Premier League Manager of the Year ===
Player	Ref
(Scotland) George Burley	

=== LMA Manager of the Year ===
Player	Ref
(Scotland) George Burley	
