= 2001–02 Ipswich Town F.C. season =

Ipswich Town
2001–02 season
- Chairman: David Sheepshanks
- Manager: George Burley
- Stadium: Portman Road
- Premier League: 18th (relegated)
- FA Cup: Fourth round
- League Cup: Fourth round
- UEFA Cup: Third round
- Top goalscorer: League: Marcus Bent (9); All: Marcus Stewart; Marcus Bent (10 each)
- Highest home attendance: 28,433 (vs Manchester United, 27 Apr 2002, Premier League)
- Lowest home attendance: 21,197 (vs Derby County, 21 Aug 2001, Premier League)
- Average home league attendance: 24,396
Home colours	Away colours

During the 2001–02 English football season, Ipswich Town competed in the FA Premier League.

== Season summary ==
A year after finishing fifth in the Premiership and earning George Burley the title of "Manager of the Year", Ipswich dropped back into Division One after two years among the elite after falling victim to second season syndrome. A dismal start to the season saw their UEFA Cup dream end in the third phase of the competition, while after 18 games they were still bottom of the Premiership with just one win. A turnaround then followed and seven wins from eight games pulled Ipswich up to 12th and appeared to have secured their survival. But another slump set in and this time they were unable to halt it. Any lingering hopes of survival were ended on the final day by a 5–0 defeat against Liverpool.

Despite losing their Premiership status, the Tractor Boys still had European action to look forward to. They attained UEFA Cup qualification via the UEFA Respect Fair Play ranking.

== First-team squad ==
Squad at end of season

Note: Flags indicate national team as defined under FIFA eligibility rules; some limited exceptions apply. Players may hold more than one non-FIFA nationality.

No.	Pos.	Nation	Player
1	GK	ENG	Andy Marshall
2	DF	NED	Fabian Wilnis
3	MF	ENG	Jamie Clapham
4	DF	ENG	John McGreal
5	DF	ISL	Hermann Hreiðarsson
6	DF	ENG	Mark Venus
7	MF	NIR	Jim Magilton
8	MF	IRL	Matt Holland (captain)
9	FW	ESP	Pablo Couñago
10	FW	ENG	Alun Armstrong
11	FW	ENG	Marcus Stewart
12	FW	ENG	Richard Naylor
14	MF	ENG	Jermaine Wright
15	DF	ENG	Chris Makin

No.	Pos.	Nation	Player
17	DF	ENG	Wayne Brown
18	FW	ENG	Darren Bent
19	DF	ENG	Titus Bramble
21	GK	IRL	Keith Branagan
22	MF	ENG	Tommy Miller
30	MF	NED	Martijn Reuser
32	MF	ENG	Darren Ambrose
33	MF	NGR	Finidi George
34	GK	ITA	Matteo Sereni
35	MF	ARG	Sixto Peralta (on loan from Inter Milan)
36	DF	DEN	Thomas Gaardsøe
37	MF	FRA	Ulrich Le Pen
38	FW	ENG	Marcus Bent

=== Left club during season ===
Note: Flags indicate national team as defined under FIFA eligibility rules; some limited exceptions apply. Players may hold more than one non-FIFA nationality.

No.	Pos.	Nation	Player
23	FW	NED	Guillermo Graaven (released)
31	DF	SLO	Amir Karić (loaned to NK Maribor)

No.	Pos.	Nation	Player
—	FW	NIR	Sean Friars (to Carlisle United)

=== Reserve squad ===
The following players were contracted to Ipswich, but did not make any competitive appearances that season.

Note: Flags indicate national team as defined under FIFA eligibility rules; some limited exceptions apply. Players may hold more than one non-FIFA nationality.

No.	Pos.	Nation	Player
13	GK	ENG	Mike Salmon
16	DF	ENG	Gary Croft
20	FW	ENG	Richard Logan
24	MF	NED	Nabil Abidallah
25	MF	ENG	Ashley Nicholls
26	GK	ENG	James Pullen
27	MF	ENG	Matt Bloomfield
28	DF	ENG	Lee Beevers

No.	Pos.	Nation	Player
29	DF	RSA	Justin Miller
—	DF	ENG	Chris Hogg
—	DF	ENG	Matt Richards
—	DF	TUR	Erdem Artun
—	MF	ENG	Robert Dickinson
—	MF	ENG	Ian Westlake
—	FW	ENG	Ed Chibogu
—	FW	ENG	Alan Connell

== Pre-season ==
Ipswich's pre-season in 2001 included two pre-season tours, the first being a tour of Scandinavia in July. The second tour took place in the Republic of Ireland in August.

=== Legend ===
Win	Draw	Loss

Date	Opponent	Venue	Result	Attendance	Scorers
18 July 2001	Tampere United	A	4–2	Unknown	Couñago, Stewart, Reuser (pen), Miller
20 July 2001	Vaasan Palloseura	A	3–2	Unknown	Hreiðarsson, Naylor, D Bent
22 July 2001	FC Flora	A	5–1	Unknown	Stewart, Couñago (2), Clapham, Reuser
25 July 2001	Braintree Town	A	5–1	Unknown	Brown, Reuser (2), Bramble, Stewart
29 July 2001	Peterborough United	A	2–0	Unknown	Brown, D Bent
4 August 2001	PSV Eindhoven	H	0–2	Unknown	
7 August 2001	Dublin City	A	5–0	Unknown	Naylor (3), Stewart, Wright
9 August 2001	Bray Wanderers	A	2–0	Unknown	Naylor, Stewart

== Competitions ==
=== FA Premier League ===
==== League table ====
Pos	Team	Pld	W	D	L	GF	GA	GD	Pts	Qualification or relegation
16	Bolton Wanderers	38	9	13	16	44	62	−18	40	
17	Sunderland	38	10	10	18	29	51	−22	40	
18	Ipswich Town (R)	38	9	9	20	41	64	−23	36	UEFA Cup QR and relegation to the First Division (Note: Ipswich Town qualified for the UEFA Cup qualifying as the winners of Premiership Fair Play League by The Football Association, and as one of the UEFA Fair Play ranking winners.)
19	Derby County (R)	38	8	6	24	33	63	−30	30	Relegation to the Football League First Division
20	Leicester City (R)	38	5	13	20	30	64	−34	28	Relegation to the Football League First Division

Source: Premier League
Rules for classification: 1) points; 2) goal difference; 3) number of goals scored.
(R) Relegated

==== Results by round ====
Round	1	2	3	4	5	6	7	8	9	10	11	12	13	14	15	16	17	18	19	20	21	22	23	24	25	26	27	28	29	30	31	32	33	34	35	36	37	38
Ground	A	H	H	A	H	A	H	H	A	A	H	A	H	A	H	H	A	A	H	H	A	H	A	H	A	H	H	A	A	A	H	A	H	A	A	H	H	A
Result	L	W	L	D	D	L	L	D	D	D	L	L	L	D	L	L	L	W	W	W	L	W	W	W	W	L	L	L	L	D	D	L	D	L	L	W	L	L
Position	17	7	12	14	13	18	18	18	18	18	18	19	20	20	20	20	20	20	19	19	19	18	18	16	12	14	15	16	17	17	18	18	18	18	18	18	18	18

Source: https://www.worldfootball.net/teams/te1058/ipswich-town/all-matches/
A = Away; H = Home; W = Win; D = Draw; L = Loss

==== Legend ====
Win	Draw	Loss

Ipswich Town's score comes first

==== Matches ====
Date	Opponent	Venue	Result	Attendance	Scorers
18 August 2001	Sunderland	A	0-1	47,370	
21 August 2001	Derby County	H	3-1	21,197	George (2), Naylor
25 August 2001	Charlton Athletic	H	0-1	22,804	
8 September 2001	Leicester City	A	1–1	18,774	Stewart
16 September 2001	Blackburn Rovers	H	1–1	22,126	Armstrong
22 September 2001	Manchester United	A	0–4	67,551	
30 September 2001	Leeds United	H	1–2	22,643	Stewart
13 October 2001	Everton	H	0–0	22,820	
21 October 2001	Fulham	A	1–1	17,221	Wright
24 October 2001	Southampton	A	3–3	29,614	Stewart (2), Venus
28 October 2001	West Ham United	H	2–3	22,834	Hreidarsson, Holland
4 November 2001	Chelsea	A	1–2	40,497	Stewart (pen)
18 November 2001	Bolton Wanderers	H	1–2	22,335	Holland
25 November 2001	Middlesbrough	A	0–0	32,586	
1 December 2001	Arsenal	H	0–2	24,666	
9 December 2001	Newcastle United	H	0–1	24,748	
17 December 2001	Aston Villa	A	1–2	29,320	George
22 December 2001	Tottenham Hotspur	A	2–1	36,040	George, Armstrong
26 December 2001	Leicester City	H	2–0	24,403	M Bent, Peralta
29 December 2001	Sunderland	H	5–0	24,517	Armstrong (2), Gaardsøe, George, Clapham
1 January 2002	Charlton Athletic	A	2–3	25,893	M Bent (2)
12 January 2002	Tottenham Hotspur	H	2–1	25,077	M Bent, McGreal
19 January 2002	Derby County	A	3–1	29,658	M Bent, Peralta, Reuser
30 January 2002	Fulham	H	1–0	25,156	M Bent
2 February 2002	Everton	A	2–1	33,069	Peralta, Holland
9 February 2002	Liverpool	H	0–6	25,608	
2 March 2002	Southampton	H	1–3	25,440	George
6 March 2002	Leeds United	A	0–2	39,414	
13 March 2002	Blackburn Rovers	A	1–2	23,305	Stewart
16 March 2002	Newcastle United	A	2–2	51,115	M Bent (2)
23 March 2002	Aston Villa	H	0–0	28,053	
30 March 2002	West Ham United	A	1–3	33,871	M Bent
1 April 2002	Chelsea	H	0–0	28,053	
6 April 2002	Bolton Wanderers	A	1–4	25,817	Clapham
21 April 2002	Arsenal	A	0–2	38,058	
24 April 2002	Middlesbrough	H	1–0	25,979	D Bent
27 April 2002	Manchester United	H	0–1	28,433	
11 May 2002	Liverpool	A	0–5	44,088	

=== FA Cup ===
Round	Date	Opponent	Venue	Result	Attendance	Goalscorers
R3	5 January 2002	Dagenham & Redbridge	A	4–1	5,949	Peralta (2), Magilton, Stewart
R4	27 January 2002	Manchester City	H	1–4	21,199	M Bent

=== League Cup ===
Round	Date	Opponent	Venue	Result	Attendance	Goalscorers
R3	9 October 2001	Crewe Alexandra	A	3–2	6,116	Reuser (2), Armstrong
R4	27 November 2001	Newcastle United	A	1–4	32,576	D Bent

=== UEFA Cup ===
Round	Date	Opponent	Venue	Result	Attendance	Goalscorers
R1 First Leg	20 September 2001	Torpedo Moscow	H	1–1	21,201	Bramble
R1 Second Leg	28 September 2001	Torpedo Moscow	A	2–1 (won 3–2 on agg)	10,500	George, Stewart
R2 First Leg	18 October 2001	Helsingborg	H	0–0	22,254	
R2 Second Leg	1 November 2001	Helsingborg	A	3–1 (won 3–1 on agg)	9,484	Hreidarsson, Stewart (2)
R3 First Leg	22 November 2001	Inter Milan	H	1–0	24,569	Armstrong
R3 Second Leg	6 December 2001	Inter Milan	A	1–4 (lost 2–4 on agg)	25,358	Armstrong (pen)

== Transfers ==
=== Transfers in ===
Date	Pos	Name	From	Fee	Ref
1 July 2001	FW	(Spain) Pablo Couñago	(Spain) Celta Vigo	Free transfer	
2 July 2001	GK	(England) Andy Marshall	(England) Norwich City	Free transfer	
16 July 2001	MF	(England) Tommy Miller	(England) Hartlepool United	£750,000	
16 August 2001	MF	(Nigeria) Finidi George	(Spain) Mallorca	£3,100,000	
17 August 2001	GK	(Italy) Matteo Sereni	(Italy) Sampdoria	£4,500,000	
28 August 2001	DF	(Denmark) Thomas Gaardsøe	(Denmark) AaB	£1,000,000	
13 November 2001	MF	(France) Ulrich Le Pen	(France) Lorient	Undisclosed	
23 November 2001	FW	(England) Marcus Bent	(England) Blackburn Rovers	£3,000,000	

=== Loans in ===
Date from	Pos	Name	From	Date until	Ref
22 August 2001	MF	(Argentina) Sixto Peralta	(Italy) Inter Milan	30 June 2002	

=== Transfers out ===
Date	Pos	Name	To	Fee	Ref
1 July 2001	DF	(England) John Scales	Retired		
5 July 2001	GK	(England) Richard Wright	(England) Arsenal	£1,500,000	
31 July 2001	FW	(England) James Scowcroft	(England) Leicester City	£3,000,000	
8 August 2001	FW	(Northern Ireland) Sean Friars	(Northern Ireland) Newry City	Free transfer	
28 October 2001	DF	(Slovenia) Amir Karić	Free agent	Mutual Consent	
3 December 2001	FW	(Netherlands) Guillermo Graaven	Free agent	Released	

=== Loans out ===
Date from	Pos	Name	From	Date until	Ref
13 August 2001	GK	(England) James Pullen	(England) Blackpool	21 April 2002	
13 September 2001	DF	(England) Wayne Brown	(England) Wimbledon	31 December 2001	
10 December 2001	FW	(England) Richard Logan	(England) Torquay United	12 March 2002	
16 January 2002	DF	(England) Gary Croft	(England) Wigan Athletic	19 February 2002	
28 January 2002	FW	(England) Richard Naylor	(England) Millwall	3 March 2002	
30 January 2002	DF	(England) Wayne Brown	(England) Watford	22 April 2002	
15 February 2002	MF	(England) Ashley Nicholls	(England) Canvey Island	1 June 2002	
4 March 2002	FW	(England) Richard Naylor	(England) Barnsley	22 April 2002	
27 March 2002	DF	(England) Gary Croft	(England) Cardiff City	2 May 2002	

Transfers in: ▼£13,750,000
Transfers out: ▲£9,000,000
Total spending: ▼£4,750,000

== Squad statistics ==
All statistics updated as of end of season

=== Appearances and goals ===
No.	Pos	Nat	Player	Total		Premier League		FA Cup		League Cup		UEFA Cup	
No.	Pos	Nat	Player	Apps	Goals	Apps	Goals	Apps	Goals	Apps	Goals	Apps	Goals
Goalkeepers
1	GK	(England) ENG	Andy Marshall	15	0	13	0	2	0	0	0	0	0
21	GK	(Republic of Ireland) IRL	Keith Branagan	1	0	0+1	0	0	0	0	0	0	0
34	GK	(Italy) ITA	Matteo Sereni	33	0	25	0	0	0	2	0	6	0
Defenders
2	DF	(Netherlands) NED	Fabian Wilnis	19	0	6+8	0	1	0	1+1	0	2	0
4	DF	(England) ENG	John McGreal	33	1	27	1	1	0	2	0	3	0
5	DF	(Iceland) ISL	Hermann Hreiðarsson	47	2	38	1	2	0	1	0	6	1
6	DF	(England) ENG	Mark Venus	35	1	29	1	0	0	1	0	5	0
15	DF	(England) ENG	Chris Makin	38	0	30	0	1	0	2	0	4+1	0
17	DF	(England) ENG	Wayne Brown	1	0	0	0	1	0	0	0	0	0
19	DF	(England) ENG	Titus Bramble	24	1	16+2	0	2	0	0	0	4	1
36	DF	(Denmark) DEN	Thomas Gaardsøe	6	1	3+1	1	0	0	0+1	0	0+1	0
Midfielders
3	MF	(England) ENG	Jamie Clapham	41	2	22+10	2	0+1	0	2	0	4+2	0
7	MF	(Northern Ireland) NIR	Jim Magilton	30	1	16+8	0	1	1	0	0	5	0
8	MF	(Republic of Ireland) IRL	Matt Holland	46	3	38	3	1	0	1	0	6	0
14	MF	(England) ENG	Jermaine Wright	38	1	24+5	1	2	0	2	0	4+1	0
22	MF	(England) ENG	Tommy Miller	13	0	5+3	0	0+1	0	2	0	0+2	0
30	MF	(Netherlands) NED	Martijn Reuser	30	3	18+6	1	2	0	1	2	1+2	0
32	MF	(England) ENG	Darren Ambrose	1	0	0+1	0	0	0	0	0	0	0
33	MF	(Nigeria) NGR	Finidi George	29	7	21+4	6	0	0	0	0	4	1
35	MF	(Argentina) ARG	Sixto Peralta	29	5	16+6	3	2	2	1	0	2+2	0
37	MF	(France) FRA	Ulrich Le Pen	2	0	0+1	0	0+1	0	0	0	0	0
Forwards
9	FW	(Spain) ESP	Pablo Couñago	19	0	1+12	0	0+1	0	1	0	2+2	0
10	FW	(England) ENG	Alun Armstrong	38	7	21+11	4	0+1	0	2	1	1+2	2
11	FW	(England) ENG	Marcus Stewart	35	10	20+8	6	2	1	1	0	4	3
12	FW	(England) ENG	Richard Naylor	22	1	5+9	1	0+1	0	0+2	0	3+2	0
18	FW	(England) ENG	Darren Bent	7	2	2+3	1	0	0	0+1	1	0+1	0
38	FW	(England) ENG	Marcus Bent	27	10	22+3	9	2	1	0	0	0	0

Last updated: end of season
Source: Competitions

=== Goalscorers ===
No.	Pos	Nat	Player	Premier League	FA Cup	League Cup	UEFA Cup	Total
11	FW	(England)	Marcus Stewart	6	1	0	3	10
38	FW	(England)	Marcus Bent	9	1	0	0	10
10	FW	(England)	Alun Armstrong	4	0	1	2	7
33	MF	(Nigeria)	Finidi George	6	0	0	1	7
35	MF	(Argentina)	Sixto Peralta	3	2	0	0	5
8	MF	(Republic of Ireland)	Matt Holland	3	0	0	0	3
30	MF	(Netherlands)	Martijn Reuser	1	0	2	0	3
3	MF	(England)	Jamie Clapham	2	0	0	0	2
5	DF	(Iceland)	Hermann Hreiðarsson	1	0	0	1	2
7	MF	(Northern Ireland)	Jim Magilton	1	1	0	0	2
18	FW	(England)	Darren Bent	1	0	1	0	2
19	DF	(England)	Titus Bramble	1	0	0	1	2
4	DF	(England)	John McGreal	1	0	0	0	1
6	DF	(England)	Mark Venus	1	0	0	0	1
12	FW	(England)	Richard Naylor	1	0	0	0	1
14	MF	(England)	Jermaine Wright	1	0	0	0	1
36	DF	(Denmark)	Thomas Gaardsøe	1	0	0	0	1
Total				43	5	4	8	60

=== Clean sheets ===
Number	Nation	Name	Premier League	FA Cup	League Cup	UEFA Cup	Total
1	(England)	Andy Marshall	3	0	0	0	3
34	(Italy)	Matteo Sereni	5	0	0	2	7
Total			8	0	0	2	10

=== Disciplinary record ===
No.	Pos.	Name	Premier League		FA Cup		League Cup		UEFA Cup		Total	
No.	Pos.	Name	Yellow card	Red card	Yellow card	Red card	Yellow card	Red card	Yellow card	Red card	Yellow card	Red card
1	GK	(England) Andy Marshall	1	0	0	0	0	0	0	0	1	0
2	DF	(Netherlands) Fabian Wilnis	2	0	0	0	0	0	0	0	2	0
3	MF	(England) Jamie Clapham	0	0	0	0	0	0	1	0	1	0
4	DF	(England) John McGreal	7	0	0	0	1	0	0	0	8	0
5	DF	(Iceland) Hermann Hreiðarsson	5	0	0	0	0	0	0	0	5	0
6	DF	(England) Mark Venus	3	0	0	0	0	0	0	0	3	0
7	MF	(Northern Ireland) Jim Magilton	1	0	0	0	0	0	1	0	2	0
9	FW	(Spain) Pablo Couñago	1	0	0	0	0	0	0	0	1	0
10	FW	(England) Alun Armstrong	1	0	0	0	1	0	0	0	2	0
11	FW	(England) Marcus Stewart	1	0	0	0	0	0	0	0	1	0
12	FW	(England) Richard Naylor	3	0	1	0	0	0	0	0	4	0
14	MF	(England) Jermaine Wright	3	0	0	0	0	0	1	0	4	0
15	DF	(England) Chris Makin	4	0	0	0	0	0	1	0	5	0
19	DF	(England) Titus Bramble	2	0	0	0	0	0	1	0	3	0
22	MF	(England) Tommy Miller	1	0	1	0	1	0	0	0	3	0
30	MF	(Netherlands) Martijn Reuser	3	0	0	0	0	0	0	0	3	0
34	GK	(Italy) Matteo Sereni	0	1	0	0	0	0	0	0	0	1
35	MF	(Argentina) Sixto Peralta	2	0	0	0	0	0	1	0	3	0
36	DF	(Denmark) Thomas Gaardsøe	1	0	0	0	0	0	0	0	1	0
38	FW	(England) Marcus Bent	1	0	0	0	0	0	0	0	1	0
Total			42	1	2	0	3	0	6	0	53	1

=== Starting 11 ===
Considering starts in all competitions

No.	Pos.	Nat.	Name	MS	Notes
34	GK	(Italy)	Matteo Sereni	33	
15	RB	(England)	Chris Makin	37	
6	CB	(England)	Mark Venus	35	
4	CB	(England)	John McGreal	33	
5	LB	(Iceland)	Hermann Hreiðarsson	47	
33	RM	(Nigeria)	Finidi George	25	Martijn Reuser has 22 starts
14	CM	(England)	Jermaine Wright	32	
8	CM	(Republic of Ireland)	Matt Holland	46	
3	LM	(England)	Jamie Clapham	28	
10	CF	(England)	Alun Armstrong	24	Marcus Bent also has 24 starts
11	CF	(England)	Marcus Stewart	27	

4–4–2 Formation

== Awards ==
=== Player awards ===
Award	Player	Ref
Player of the Year	(England) Mark Venus	
Young Player of the Year	(England) Will Snowdon	

=== Premier League Player of the Month ===
Month	Player	Ref
January	(England) Marcus Bent	
