= Richard Naylor =

English footballer (born 1977)

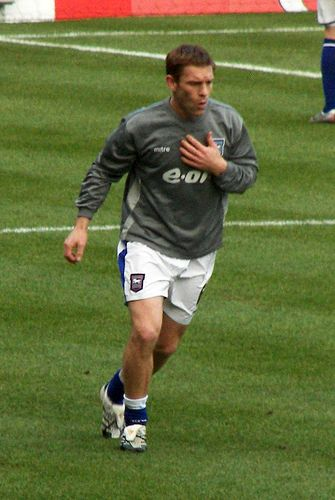
- Naylor with Ipswich Town in 2008

Personal information
- Full name: Richard Alan Naylor
- Date of birth: 28 February 1977 (age 49)
- Place of birth: Leeds, England
- Height: 6 ft 1 in (1.85 m)
- Positions: Centre back; striker

Youth career
- 1993–1996: Ipswich Town

Senior career*
Years	Team	Apps	(Gls)
1996–2009	Ipswich Town	324	(38)
2002	→ Millwall (loan)	3	(0)
2002	→ Barnsley (loan)	8	(0)
2009–2011	Leeds United	66	(4)
2011–2012	Doncaster Rovers	13	(0)
2012	Rotherham United	5	(0)
Total		419	(42)

Managerial career
- 2012–2014: Leeds United Under 18
- 2013: Leeds United (caretaker-assistant manager)
- * Club domestic league appearances and goals

Richard Alan Naylor (born 28 February 1977) is an English former professional footballer who played as a centre-back.

Naylor started his career at Ipswich Town, where he played as a striker up until he was moved to centre-back by Joe Royle in 2002; he continued to play as a centre-back ever since. After his retirement from professional football he was Under 18's manager of Leeds United, he also included a brief spell as Leeds' caretaker assistant manager after the sacking of Neil Warnock in 2013.

== Playing career ==
=== Ipswich Town ===
Born in Leeds, West Yorkshire, Naylor graduated through the Ipswich Town youth academy and played for Ipswich for 14 years. He started out his Ipswich career as a robust centre forward making an instant impact in the mid-1990s for the club. However a number of recurring injuries held Naylor back from achieving his full potential as a striker and he soon found himself behind Alex Mathie, James Scowcroft, David Johnson and later Marcus Stewart in the pecking order at Portman Road.

In 1999–2000, Naylor started in fine form but was once again forced onto the bench, however he would play a key role in Ipswich's decisive play-off final against Barnsley (a club he would later join). Naylor came on as a first-half substitute for the injured David Johnson, and was widely credited at the time for changing the shape of the match in Ipswich's favour, scoring one and setting up another sending Ipswich back into the Premier League for the first time since 1995.

While Ipswich where riding high in the Premiership, Naylor once again found himself out of favour with then manager George Burley. Naylor continued to make sporadic appearances for Ipswich during 2000–01 which saw Ipswich qualify for a place in the UEFA Cup. Naylor would score Ipswich's last goal of the season against Derby County.

In 2001–2002 Naylor was out of Ipswich's plans, despite having the opportunity to play against Italian giants Inter Milan in the UEFA Cup. He was loaned out to Barnsley and Millwall in 2002 in what seemed to many as the end of his Ipswich career.

However Ipswich were relegated in 2001–02 by a point and as the promotion push in 2002–03 started to fizzle out, Burley was replaced by Joe Royle as Ipswich manager and with the departure of many players from the Club due to administration, Naylor was back in the picture. Royle decided to switch Naylor back to play as a centre half, a move that saw Naylor improve his performances and ironically increase his goal scoring tally for the club.

Naylor played a key role in Ipswich's promotion pushes in 2003–04 and 2004–05 where the club would lose in the semi-finals to West Ham United and went on to become a staple for club in the less successful 2005–06. In 2006, Joe Royle left Ipswich and Naylor's former teammate Jim Magilton took over as manager. On 1 September 2006, he was given a testimonial at Ipswich for 10 years as a professional at the club in which 10,000 fans attended the game at Portman Road to see the current Ipswich team play against the Wembley 2000 XI. It finished 3–3 with Naylor fittingly scoring a last minute penalty. Naylor remained in the first team at Ipswich playing at the back alongside team captain Jason DeVos in 2006–07 and 2007–08. In 2008–09 his last season with the club, he was made club captain.

=== Leeds United ===
On 14 January 2009, Naylor joined his boyhood team Leeds United on loan from Ipswich. The move was made permanent on 2 February when he joined on a free transfer. Naylor was appointed vice-captain of the club and scored his first goal for the club in the 2–0 win over Southend United. Naylor helped rejuvenate Leeds' form after signing for his boyhood club, who had previously conceded several goals from set pieces. Leeds' defence considerably improved, and when Sam Sodje also signed for Leeds on loan they made a formidable centre back partnership at the back, after Leeds had previously had some defence problems. The performances of Naylor and Sodje helped Leeds reach the playoff semi-finals, but they eventually lost out to Millwall after losing 2–1 on aggregate over two legs.

Ian Westlake had revealed in the October/November 2006 issue of the Leeds, Leeds, Leeds magazine about Naylor that "Bam-Bam's a massive Leeds fan – he's got the white rose tattooed on his arm and sings 'Marching On Together' in the shower after training".

In July 2009, he signed for Leeds permanently from Ipswich Town and Naylor was appointed the new permanent captain of Leeds United following former captain Frazer Richardson's departure in the summer. Naylor had an operation on his back and missed all of the 2009–10 pre season and several of Leeds games in League One. During his absence the captain's armband was temporarily passed to Jonny Howson.

Naylor made his comeback from injury playing 61 minutes in Leeds United's Reserves 2–1 win over Middlesbrough Reserves. After recovering from injury Naylor has found himself on Leeds' bench due to the impressive form of Leeds central defensive partnership.

Naylor made his return to first team action on 29 September, by starting in the game at home to Carlisle United. Naylor retained his place in the side against Charlton Athletic. Naylor missed the game against Brighton with an injury. The injury kept Naylor out of a few games. Naylor returned to the Leeds side against Accrington Stanley in the Football League Trophy. Naylor suffered an injury late on in the match against Hartlepool but was fit enough to start against Stockport County. Naylor captained Leeds to victory in the FA Cup third round against Manchester United. After the game he said "It is unbelievable, a tremendous result that has been a long time coming. I am really proud of the lads. I thought we had a few chances to make it 2–0 late on. We dug in when we needed to but we also played some good football."

Naylor missed Leeds' FA Cup tie against Tottenham Hotspur on 23 January 2010 through injury. Leeds earned a replay by getting a 2–2 draw. Naylor also missed Leeds defeat to Swindon Town but returned against Colchester United. Naylor played in Leeds' Football League Trophy second leg Northern Area final match against Carlisle United and Naylor was at fault for one of the goals conceded when his error let in Adam Clayton to slot the ball home for Carlisle. Leeds were knocked out of the Football League Trophy after losing 6–5 on penalties. After a solid start in defence, Leeds have continued to leak goals with 19 goals being conceded in the nine games since the Manchester United victory. He scored two goals against Yeovil Town 5 April 2010. On 1 May 2010, during a game in which a win would have seen Leeds promoted, Naylor scored an own goal which gave Charlton Athletic the victory, and ensured that Leeds' season came down to the final match. Due to a hamstring injury sustained in the pregame warmup, Naylor missed the final game of the season against Bristol Rovers. Despite his absence, Leeds went on to win the game, after stand-in captain Jermaine Beckford scored the match winning goal to ensure a 2–1 victory for Leeds. This resulted in Leeds United clinching promotion to the Football League Championship, claiming second place on the League One table and gaining automatic promotion.

Naylor missed Leeds' pre season tour of Slovakia through injury, but it was during the tour that manager Simon Grayson said Naylor would remain as Leeds club captain for the forthcoming season. Naylor captained Leeds in the opening game of the season loss against Derby County, he was on the bench for the following game after being replaced by Alex Bruce in the starting line-up against Lincoln City. Naylor scored an own goal against Millwall on 21 August, Leeds however went on to win the game 3–1. Naylor scored his first goal of the 2010–11 season in a 1–0 away win against Watford, the match was also Naylor's 450th career appearance. Naylor's indifferent start to the season continued when his costly slip let in Swansea City striker Stephen Dobbie to score in Leeds' 2–1 victory against Swansea. After the game manager Simon Grayson backed his captain after his place came under scrutiny The following game, again Naylor's position in the team came under further pressure as Leeds conceded 5 against Barnsley in a 5–2 defeat. For the following game against Doncaster Rovers, Naylor was named on the bench with Alex Bruce taking his place in the side, with Bruce putting in an impressive performance and helping Leeds keep a clean sheet. Naylor remained on the bench in the game against Sheffield United.

After three games on the bench, Naylor returned to Leeds starting 11 against his former club Ipswich Town. Naylor's error against Leicester City allowed Steve Howard to score the winning goal and again put Naylor's place in the team under scrutiny. Naylor's error against Leicester saw him drop out of the squad against Cardiff City. After suffering a knee injury Naylor was booked in for knee surgery on 25 November which would keep him out for 6 weeks. After knee surgery Naylor was looking to return for Leeds sometime in the new year. Naylor returned to Leeds first team action for the first time since November when on 5 March 2011 he came on as a second-half substitute in Leeds' 5–2 against Doncaster Rovers. On 22 April, Naylor made his first start for Leeds since October when he came into the side and regained his captaincy against Reading where Leeds managed to keep a rare clean sheet. Naylor managed to get an assist for Max Gradel in Naylor's final game for Leeds against Championship winners Queesn Park Rangers. Leeds won the game 2–1 and Naylor was substituted late on in the second half for Patrick Kisnorbo.

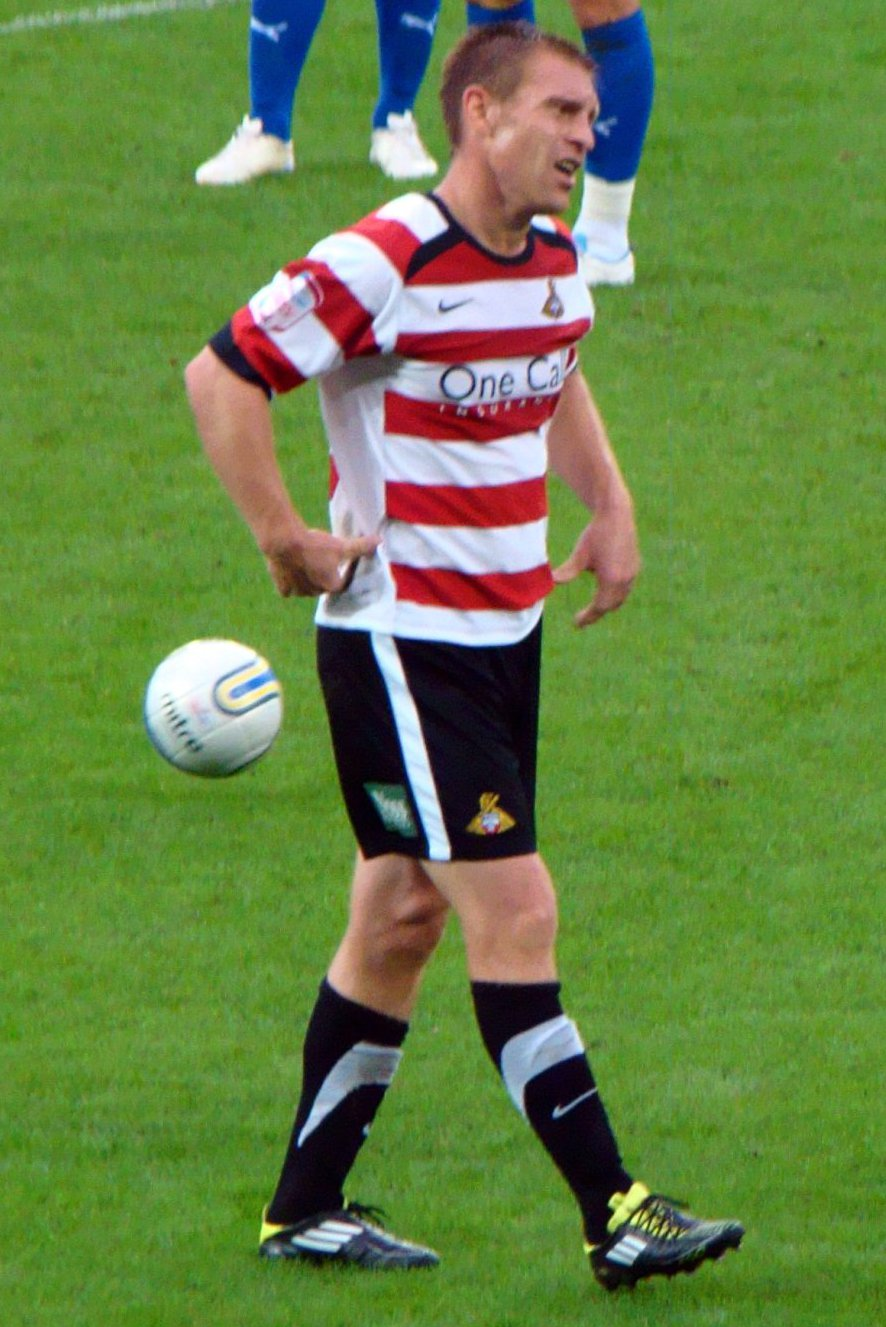
Naylor playing for Doncaster Rovers in 2011

It was announced on the Leeds United website on 9 May 2011 that, after two years, Naylor was leaving the club on a free transfer as the club have chosen not to renew his contract. Naylor said in an interview about his time at Leeds 'when I look back on it I can have pride that I have made a positive contribution and helped the club move forward. "It is a tremendous football club and is everything I thought it would be. The fans are tremendous home and away and I just loved playing for Leeds United." He also revealed that he is doing his UEFA Coaching B badge during the summer of 2011 and that he would like to return to Leeds in a coaching capacity someday.

=== Doncaster Rovers ===
On 11 July 2011, Naylor joined Doncaster Rovers on a short-term contract from Leeds United on a free transfer. He made his debut for Doncaster against Brighton & Hove Albion on 6 August 2011. He made 15 appearances for Doncaster before leaving the club in January 2012.

=== Rotherham United ===
On 13 January 2012, Naylor signed with Rotherham United on a deal until the end of the 2011–12 season. He made his debut for Rotherham in a 3–2 defeat at Dagenham & Redbridge on 28 January, having prior been an unused substitute twice in home losses to Swindon Town and Port Vale. He made 5 appearances for Rotherham during the second-half of the 2011–12 season. He was released by Rotherham in May 2012.

== Coaching career ==
After leaving Leeds, Naylor revealed that he was doing his UEFA B Coaching badges during the summer of 2011.

On 12 July 2012, Naylor retired from playing football and re-joined Leeds United as a coach working with the youth team alongside Neil Redfearn.

In his first season in management during the 2012/13 season Naylor won the Under 18's league with Leeds Under 18's team. Naylor's side were crowned Champions on 30 March after beating nearest rivals Nottingham Forest 7–2 to be declared league champions.

After the sacking of Neil Warnock on 1 April, Naylor moved up to be Leeds United's caretaker assistant manager to assist caretaker manager Neil Redfearn in the role.

On 11 July 2014, Naylor was made redundant as Leeds Under 18's Manager by Owner Massimo Cellino.

== Career statistics ==
Appearances and goals by club, season and competition
Club	Season	League			FA Cup		League Cup		Other		Total	
Club	Season	Division	Apps	Goals	Apps	Goals	Apps	Goals	Apps	Goals	Apps	Goals
Ipswich Town	1996–97	First Division	27	4	1	0	4	1	0	0	32	5
Ipswich Town	1997–98	First Division	5	2	0	0	0	0	0	0	5	2
Ipswich Town	1998–99	First Division	29	5	2	0	2	0	2 (Note: Appearances in First Division play-offs)	0	35	5
Ipswich Town	1999–00	First Division	36	8	1	0	4	0	2	1	43	9
Ipswich Town	2000–01	Premier League	13	2	1	0	2	0	—		16	2
Ipswich Town	2001–02	Premier League	14	1	1	0	2	0	5 (Note: Appearances in UEFA Cup)	0	22	1
Ipswich Town	2002–03	First Division	17	2	1	0	1	0	0	0	19	2
Ipswich Town	2003–04	First Division	39	5	2	1	2	0	2	0	45	6
Ipswich Town	2004–05	Championship	46	6	0	0	2	0	2 (Note: Appearances in Championship play-offs)	0	50	6
Ipswich Town	2005–06	Championship	42	3	1	0	1	0	—		44	3
Ipswich Town	2006–07	Championship	25	0	3	0	1	0	—		29	0
Ipswich Town	2007–08	Championship	7	0	1	0	0	0	—		8	0
Ipswich Town	2008–09	Championship	23	0	0	0	2	0	—		25	0
Ipswich Town	Total		323	38	14	1	23	1	13	1	373	41
Millwall (loan)	2001–02	First Division	3	0	0	0	0	0	0	0	3	0
Barnsley (loan)	2001–02	First Division	8	0	0	0	0	0	—		8	0
Leeds United	2008–09	League One	22	1	0	0	0	0	2 (Note: Appearances in League One play-offs)	0	24	1
Leeds United	2009–10	League One	29	2	3	0	0	0	5 (Note: Appearances in Football League Trophy)	0	37	2
Leeds United	2010–11	Championship	15	1	0	0	0	0	—		15	1
Leeds United	Total		66	4	3	0	0	0	7	0	76	4
Doncaster Rovers	2011–12	Championship	13	0	0	0	2	0	—		15	0
Rotherham United	2011–12	League Two	5	0	0	0	0	0	0	0	5	0
Career total			418	42	17	1	25	1	20	1	480	45

== Honours ==
=== As player ===
Ipswich Town

- Football League First Division play-offs: 2000

Leeds United

- Football League One second-place promotion: 2009–10

=== As manager ===
Leeds United U18

- Under 18 League: 2012–13
