= Titus Bramble =

English former professional footballer

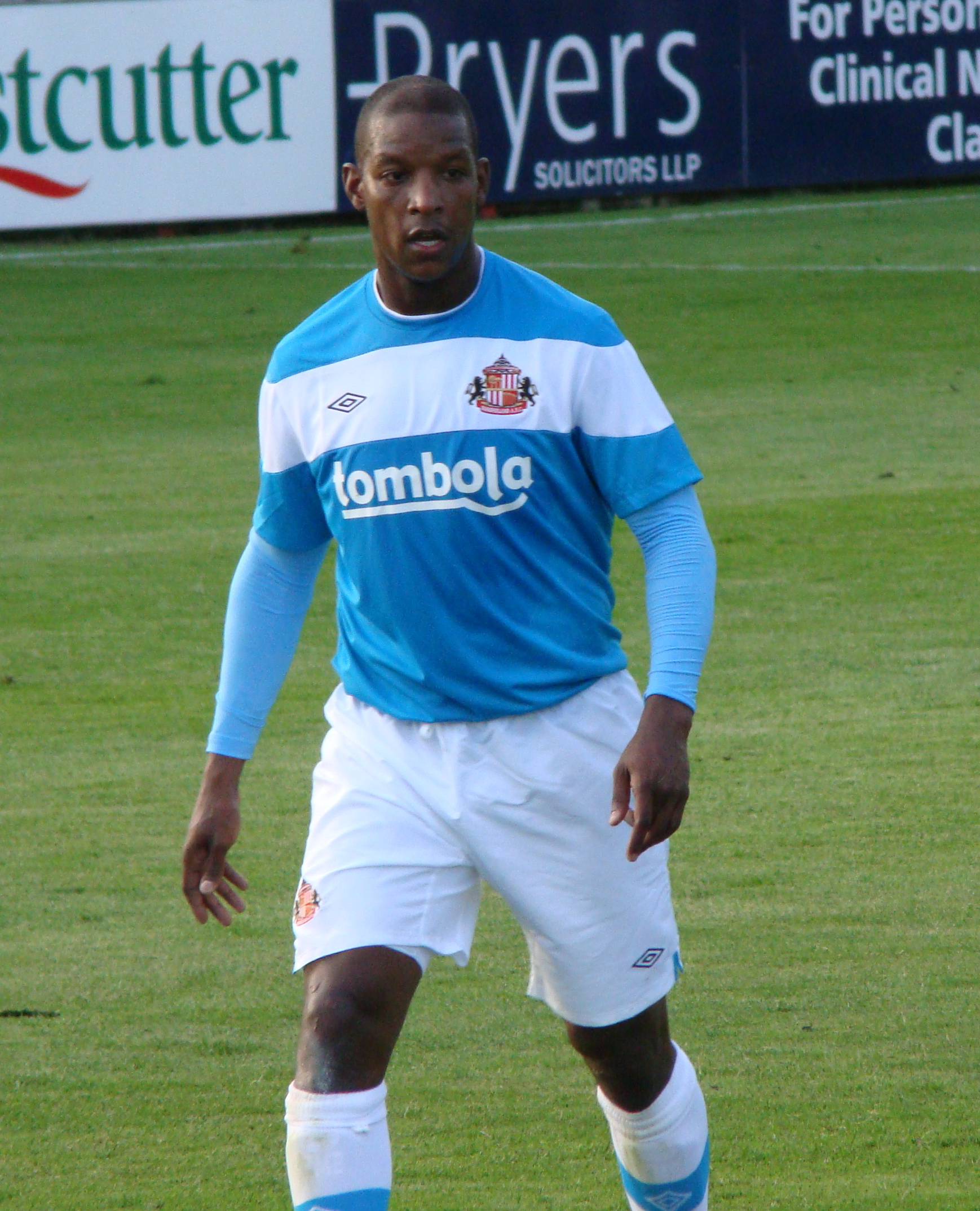
- Bramble playing for Sunderland in 2011

Personal information
- Full name: Titus Malachi Bramble
- Date of birth: 31 July 1981 (age 45)
- Place of birth: Ipswich, England
- Height: 1.85 m (6 ft 1 in)
- Position: Centre back

Team information
- Current team: Pakistan (assistant manager)

Youth career
- 1996–1998: Ipswich Town

Senior career*
Years	Team	Apps	(Gls)
1998–2002	Ipswich Town	48	(1)
1999–2000	→ Colchester United (loan)	2	(0)
2002–2007	Newcastle United	105	(3)
2007–2010	Wigan Athletic	96	(5)
2010–2013	Sunderland	47	(1)
2017	Stowmarket Town	1	(0)
Total		299	(10)

International career
2000–2002	England U21	10	(1)

Managerial career
- 2026–: Pakistan (assistant)
- * Club domestic league appearances and goals

Titus Malachi Bramble (born 31 July 1981) is an English professional football coach and former player who played as a centre back. He is the assistant manager of the Pakistan national team.

Bramble played in the Premier League for over thirteen consecutive seasons from 2000 and 2013, representing Ipswich Town, Newcastle United, Wigan Athletic and Sunderland. After being released by Sunderland in 2013, he spent several years in a coaching capacity at the Ipswich Town Academy, with whom he began his career in 1998. He had a short spell as a player-coach of Stowmarket Town in 2017.

At international level, he made 10 appearances for the England under-21s from 2000 and 2002.

== Playing career ==
=== Ipswich Town ===
Born in Ipswich, Suffolk, Bramble started his career at home town club Ipswich Town. After making his debut in the 1998–99 season, Bramble went on to make 48 league appearances for the club, spending a brief period on loan at Colchester United over the 1999–2000 season. He scored four goals for Ipswich, with strikes against Sunderland in the league, Millwall and Coventry City in the League Cup and Torpedo Moscow in the UEFA Cup.

=== Newcastle United ===
Bramble joined Newcastle in July 2002 for £6 million following Ipswich's relegation from the Premier League, vowing at the time to make himself indispensable to then manager Sir Bobby Robson.

At the end of the 2003–04 season, readers of the e-mail newsletter The Fiver voted Bramble as the worst player of the year in the Premier League. Bramble scored a volley against league champions Chelsea on 8 May 2006 that secured qualification for the UEFA Intertoto Cup.

On 10 August 2006, Bramble scored another vital goal for Newcastle in the UEFA Cup second qualifying round with a header against Latvian side Ventspils.

In December, Bramble was admitted into hospital after his injured calf swelled to double its normal size. On 31 January 2007, Bramble returned to action against Aston Villa in the centre of defence alongside Steven Taylor.

=== Wigan Athletic ===
Bramble signed for Wigan Athletic on a free transfer, agreeing to a three-year deal on 4 June 2007. On 2 January 2008, he scored at Anfield in a 1–1 draw against Liverpool – a 20-yard strike handing Wigan a late equaliser.

Bramble scored an equaliser against former club Newcastle at St. James' Park on 15 November 2008. The match ended in a 2–2 draw. His performances throughout the 2008–09 season earned him four awards at the club's awards night, including 'Player of the Year' and 'Player's Player of the Year'. On 14 July 2009, he extended his contract with Wigan until 2012.

=== Sunderland ===
On 23 July 2010, Bramble joined Sunderland for £1 million. He signed a three-year contract at the Stadium of Light, and was reunited with his former manager at Wigan, Steve Bruce. He scored his first and only Sunderland goal in a 4–0 win against Stoke City on 18 September 2011. Bramble was one of seven players released by Sunderland at the end of the 2012–13 season. He played 51 games for Sunderland.

After being released by Sunderland, he trained with West Ham United playing in their 6–2 pre-season win against Cork City. He returned to Ipswich in the pre-season to train, making his playing return in a game against Barnet but was not offered a contract.

=== Stowmarket Town ===
In August 2017, having been without a club for four years, Bramble joined Stowmarket Town, of the Eastern Counties League, as a player-coach.

== Coaching career ==
Bramble was appointed Under-11s coach at Ipswich Town. In November 2014, he said it was a "disgrace" to apply the "Rooney Rule" to English football for compulsory ethnic minority management candidate consideration.

In September 2026, Bramble was appointed as assistant manager of the Pakistan national team for their 2026 FIFA ASEAN Cup campaign, under former Newcastle teammate Nolberto Solano.

== Personal life ==
One of his brothers, Tesfaye Bramble, was a footballer and has represented Montserrat at international level. The two brothers were arrested on suspicion of rape in September 2010 with Tesfaye being convicted of the offence, and Titus later being released without charge. On 28 September 2011, Bramble was temporarily suspended by Sunderland, after having been arrested on allegations of sexual assault and possession of a Class A drug. He was cleared of these charges on 31 May 2012.

== Career statistics ==
Appearances and goals by club, season and competition
Club	Season	League			FA Cup		League Cup		Other		Total	
Club	Season	Division	Apps	Goals	Apps	Goals	Apps	Goals	Apps	Goals	Apps	Goals
Ipswich Town	1998–99	First Division	4	0	1	0	0	0	0	0	5	0
Ipswich Town	1999–2000	First Division	0	0	0	0	0	0	0	0	0	0
Ipswich Town	2000–01	Premier League	26	1	2	0	5	2	―		33	3
Ipswich Town	2001–02	Premier League	18	0	2	0	0	0	4 (Note: Appearances in UEFA Cup)	1	24	1
Ipswich Town	Total		48	1	5	0	5	2	4	1	62	4
Colchester United (loan)	1999–2000	Second Division	2	0	0	0	0	0	0	0	2	0
Newcastle United	2002–03	Premier League	16	0	0	0	0	0	8 (Note: Appearances in UEFA Champions League)	0	24	0
Newcastle United	2003–04	Premier League	29	0	1	0	0	0	11	3	41	3
Newcastle United	2004–05	Premier League	19	1	4	0	2	0	7	0	32	1
Newcastle United	2005–06	Premier League	24	2	3	0	1	0	0	0	28	2
Newcastle United	2006–07	Premier League	17	0	0	0	1	0	13 (Note: Two appearances in UEFA Intertoto Cup, eleven appearances and one goal in UEFA Cup)	1	31	1
Newcastle United	Total		105	3	8	0	4	0	39	4	156	7
Wigan Athletic	2007–08	Premier League	26	2	1	0	0	0	―		27	2
Wigan Athletic	2008–09	Premier League	35	1	1	0	3	0	―		39	1
Wigan Athletic	2009–10	Premier League	35	2	3	0	0	0	―		38	2
Wigan Athletic	Total		96	5	5	0	3	0	0	0	104	5
Sunderland	2010–11	Premier League	23	0	0	0	1	0	―		24	0
Sunderland	2011–12	Premier League	8	1	0	0	0	0	―		8	1
Sunderland	2012–13	Premier League	16	0	2	0	1	0	―		19	0
Sunderland	Total		47	1	2	0	2	0	0	0	51	1
Stowmarket Town	2017–18	ECL Premier Division	1	0	0	0	―		0	0	1	0
Career total			299	10	20	0	14	2	43	5	376	17

== Honours ==
Newcastle United

- UEFA Intertoto Cup: 2006

Individual

- Wigan Athletic Player of the Year: 2008–09
