= Chris Makin =

English footballer

Personal information
- Full name: Christopher Gregory Makin
- Date of birth: 8 May 1973 (age 53)
- Place of birth: St Helens, Lancashire, England
- Height: 5 ft 11 in (1.80 m)
- Position: Full back

Senior career*
Years	Team	Apps	(Gls)
1991–1996	Oldham Athletic	94	(4)
1992–1993	→ Wigan Athletic (loan)	15	(2)
1996–1997	Marseille	29	(0)
1997–2001	Sunderland	121	(1)
2001–2004	Ipswich Town	78	(0)
2004–2005	Leicester City	21	(0)
2005	→ Derby County (loan)	13	(0)
2005–2006	Reading	12	(0)
2006–2008	Southampton	27	(0)
2010	Radcliffe Borough	8	(0)
Total		418	(7)

International career
1994	England U21	5	(0)
- * Club domestic league appearances and goals

Christopher Gregory Makin (born 8 May 1973) is an English retired professional footballer who played as a defender. He played in the Premier League for Oldham Athletic, Sunderland, and Ipswich Town.

Makin's first retirement came 23 April 2008 on advice from his doctor, after failing to overcome a hip injury which had prevented him playing since September 2007. He returned for a brief spell with non-league Radcliffe Borough in 2010 before retiring for good.

== Career statistics ==
Appearances and goals by club, season and competition
Club	Season	League			National Cup		League Cup		Other		Total	
Club	Season	Division	Apps	Goals	Apps	Goals	Apps	Goals	Apps	Goals	Apps	Goals
Oldham Athletic	1993–94	Premier League	27	1	0	0	0	0	—		27	1
Oldham Athletic	1994–95	First Division	28	1	0	0	0	0	—		28	1
Oldham Athletic	1995–96	First Division	39	2	0	0	0	0	0	0	39	2
Oldham Athletic	Total		94	4	0	0	0	0	0	0	94	4
Wigan Athletic (loan)	1992–93	Second Division	15	2	0	0	0	0	0	0	15	2
Marseille	1996–97	French Division 1	29	0	0	0	2	0	—		31	0
Sunderland	1997–98	First Division	26	0	1	0	3	0	1 (Note: Appearance in First Division play-offs)	0	31	0
Sunderland	1998–99	First Division	38	0	2	0	7	0	—		47	0
Sunderland	1999–2000	Premier League	34	1	2	0	1	0	—		37	1
Sunderland	2000–01	Premier League	23	0	3	0	2	0	—		28	0
Sunderland	Total		121	1	8	0	13	0	1	0	143	1
Ipswich Town	2000–01	Premier League	10	0	0	0	0	0	—		10	0
Ipswich Town	2001–02	Premier League	30	0	1	0	2	0	5 (Note: Appearances in UEFA Cup)	0	38	0
Ipswich Town	2002–03	First Division	33	0	1	0	1	0	3	0	38	0
Ipswich Town	2003–04	First Division	5	0	0	0	1	0	0	0	6	0
Ipswich Town	Total		78	0	2	0	4	0	8	0	92	0
Leicester City	2004–05	Championship	21	0	1	0	1	0	—		23	0
Derby County (loan)	2004–05	Championship	13	0	0	0	0	0	0	0	13	0
Reading	2005–06	Championship	12	0	4	0	3	0	—		19	0
Southampton	2006–07	Championship	22	0	1	0	2	0	1 (Note: Appearance in Championship play-offs)	0	26	0
Southampton	2007–08	Championship	5	0	0	0	1	0	—		6	0
Southampton	Total		27	0	1	0	3	0	1	0	32	0
Career total			410	7	16	0	26	0	10	0	462	7

== Honours ==
Sunderland

- Football League First Division: 1998–99

Reading

- Football League Championship: 2005–06

Individual

- Sunderland Solid Gold XI
