= Will Snowdon =

English footballer

Personal information
- Date of birth: 7 January 1983 (age 43)
- Place of birth: Colchester, England
- Position: Defender

Youth career
- Ipswich Town

Senior career*
Years	Team	Apps	(Gls)
2003–2005	Livingston	6	(0)
2005–2006	Partick Thistle	28	(1)
2006–2007	Stranraer	27	(0)
2007–2021	Bo'ness United	406	(41)
Total		467	(42)
- * Club domestic league appearances and goals

Will Snowdon (born 7 January 1983) is an English former professional footballer.

Snowdon played in the Scottish leagues for Livingston, Partick Thistle and Stranraer. Snowdon was an unused substitute for Livingston as they won the 2004 Scottish League Cup Final.

At Partick Thistle, Will was known for his commitment and hard working style. He secured promotion from the Scottish Second Division with Thistle via the Playoffs, starting in the Playoff Final where Thistle came back from a first leg loss to secure victory, although Will missed his penalty in the shootout. Perhaps his finest moment in a Jags shirt was his decisive penalty in another shootout, this time against Inverness Caledonian Thistle in the last of the Scottish Cup, setting up a Quarter Final against Hearts.

Since 2007, Snowdon played for Bo'ness United up until his retirement from playing in April 2021.

== Honours ==
Titles

- Scottish League Cup: 2004

Individual

- Ipswich Town Young Player of the Year: 2001–02
