= Jamie Clapham =

English footballer (born 1975)

Personal information
- Full name: James Richard Clapham
- Date of birth: 7 December 1975 (age 50)
- Place of birth: Lincoln, England
- Height: 5 ft 9 in (1.75 m)
- Position: Left-back

Senior career*
| Years | Team | Apps | (Gls) |
| 1994–1998 | Tottenham Hotspur | 1 | (0) |
| 1997 | → Leyton Orient (loan) | 5 | (0) |
| 1997 | → Bristol Rovers (loan) | 5 | (0) |
| 1998 | → Ipswich Town (loan) | 12 | (0) |
| 1998–2003 | Ipswich Town | 195 | (10) |
| 2003–2006 | Birmingham City | 84 | (1) |
| 2006–2008 | Wolverhampton Wanderers | 26 | (0) |
| 2007 | → Leeds United (loan) | 13 | (0) |
| 2008 | Leicester City | 11 | (0) |
| 2008–2010 | Notts County | 70 | (3) |
| 2010–2011 | Lincoln City | 25 | (1) |
| 2011 | Kettering Town | 3 | (0) |
| Total | | 450 | (15) |

Managerial career
- 2021–: Loughborough Students
- * Club domestic league appearances and goals

James Richard Clapham (born 7 December 1975) is an English former professional footballer and current head coach of Loughborough Students.

He played as a left-back from 1994 to 2011, notably in the Premier League for Tottenham Hotspur, Ipswich Town and Birmingham City. He has also played for Leyton Orient, Bristol Rovers, Wolverhampton Wanderers, Leicester City, Leeds United, Notts County, Lincoln City and Kettering Town. He began his coaching career with Middlesbrough.

== Playing career ==
=== Tottenham Hotspur ===
Clapham was born in Lincoln, Lincolnshire. His career started at Tottenham Hotspur with Clapham playing for the Spurs' first XI in the 1995 UEFA Intertoto Cup. Subsequently, he made one first-team league appearance for Spurs, a 2–1 defeat to Coventry City on 11 May 1997. Clapham had loan spells at Leyton Orient (six games between 29 January and 22 February 1997) and Bristol Rovers (five games between 27 March and 26 April the same year).

=== Ipswich Town ===
The next season saw him loaned to Ipswich Town for two months between 9 January and 12 March 1998, the move then becoming permanent for a fee of £300,000. He made a total of 175 full and 20 substitute appearances in the league for Ipswich and scored eight goals, the most notable coming from his left-footed free kicks. In 1999, he was voted Ipswich Town's Player of the Year. He also tasted European action with the club, playing 12 games in the UEFA Cup in two successive campaigns, 2001–02 and 2002–03.

Ipswich Town's relegation in 2002 led to the club going into administration and created a need to sell players. Clapham was one such player as he was sold.

=== Birmingham City ===
He joined Premier League club Birmingham City for £1.3 million in 2003 after four years at Portman Road. He settled into the team and was a virtual ever-present until a hamstring injury forced him out in December 2003. His recovery was hampered when he suffered shingles during February 2004, and he was unable to return until April.

In the following two seasons, he remained a squad player with competition for his slot from a number of players, such as Stan Lazaridis and Julian Gray, limiting his appearances. In May 2006, he was released by the club as they slipped from the top flight. In all, he played 84 league games over three seasons and scored once, against Manchester United in December 2005.

=== Wolverhampton Wanderers ===
In July 2006, Clapham had a trial with Sheffield United and played 75 minutes of a pre-season clash with Rotherham United. He also received interest from Ipswich Town before choosing to sign for Championship club Wolverhampton Wanderers in August 2006 on a two-year deal. He played in just 26 league games during the 2006–07 season, without scoring, and was put on the transfer list at the end of it. However, there were no takers for the defender in the close season and he began the 2007–08 campaign still at Molineux.

==== Leeds United (loan) ====
He was loaned out to League One Leeds United in August 2007 and remained at Elland Road for three months, becoming Leeds first choice left back, the club was given a 15-point deduction at the start of that season and Clapham was instrumental at playing a part in Leeds' impressive early season form.

=== Leicester City ===
He failed to break back into Wolves' first team after his return and was released to join Leicester City on 31 January 2008. Clapham was released in May 2008.

=== Notts County ===
After a period in July training with West Bromwich Albion, managed by former Ipswich teammate Tony Mowbray, he joined Southend United on trial but was not offered a contract. After two weeks' training with Notts County, he signed a short-term deal with the League Two club in September 2008, then in January 2009, he signed an 18-month contract extension to keep him at the club until May 2010. He and seven other players were released at the end of the 2009–10 season.

=== Lincoln City ===
He signed a one-year contract with League Two club Lincoln City in July 2010. He scored his first goal for the club in a 2–1 win over Macclesfield Town on 9 October, and scored again in an FA Cup defeat to Hereford United. He was not offered a new contract after a mass clearout of players after Lincoln's relegation from the Football League.

=== Kettering Town ===
In August 2011 he signed for Kettering Town after a trial. A month later, after manager Morell Maison was replaced by Mark Stimson, Clapham left the club.

== Coaching career ==
Tony Mowbray appointed Clapham to a coaching role in Championship club Middlesbrough's academy after Steve Agnew left for Hull City in 2012. Clapham managed the club's under-21 team, and assisted new manager Aitor Karanka with the first team from November 2013 to March 2014. In June 2015, he rejoined Mowbray on the coaching staff at Coventry City.

In September 2016, Barnsley manager Paul Heckingbottom brought Clapham into the club as first-team coach on a short-term deal. A few weeks later, his tenure was extended to the end of the season, and extended again in July 2017.

Heckingbottom was appointed head coach of Leeds United on 6 February 2018, and took Clapham with him as his assistant. When Heckingbottom was dismissed at the end of the season, Clapham also left the club.

On 17 May 2021, Clapham was announced as the new head coach of Loughborough Students. Taking the Scholars to the semi-final of the FA Vase in the 21-22 season.

== Personal life ==
Clapham's father, Graham Clapham, and grandfather, Bert Wilkinson, were also professional footballers.

== Career statistics ==
Appearances and goals by club, season and competition
| Club | Season | League | | | FA Cup | | League Cup | | Other | | Total | |
| Club | Season | Division | Apps | Goals | Apps | Goals | Apps | Goals | Apps | Goals | Apps | Goals |
|---|---|---|---|---|---|---|---|---|---|---|---|---|
| Tottenham Hotspur | 1996–97 | Premier League | 1 | 0 | 0 | 0 | 0 | 0 | — | | 1 | 0 |
| Leyton Orient (loan) | 1996–97 | Third Division | 5 | 0 | 0 | 0 | 0 | 0 | 0 | 0 | 5 | 0 |
| Bristol Rovers (loan) | 1996–97 | Second Division | 5 | 0 | 0 | 0 | 0 | 0 | 0 | 0 | 5 | 0 |
| Ipswich Town | 1997–98 | First Division | 22 | 0 | 0 | 0 | 0 | 0 | 1 (Note: Appearance(s) in First Division play-offs) | 0 | 23 | 0 |
| Ipswich Town | 1998–99 | First Division | 46 | 3 | 2 | 0 | 4 | 0 | 2 | 0 | 54 | 3 |
| Ipswich Town | 1999–00 | First Division | 46 | 2 | 1 | 0 | 4 | 2 | 3 | 1 | 54 | 5 |
| Ipswich Town | 2000–01 | Premier League | 35 | 2 | 2 | 0 | 7 | 1 | — | | 44 | 3 |
| Ipswich Town | 2001–02 | Premier League | 32 | 2 | 1 | 0 | 2 | 0 | 6 (Note: Appearances in UEFA Cup) | 0 | 41 | 2 |
| Ipswich Town | 2002–03 | First Division | 26 | 1 | 1 | 1 | 3 | 1 | 6 | 0 | 36 | 3 |
| Ipswich Town | Total | | 207 | 10 | 7 | 1 | 20 | 4 | 18 | 1 | 252 | 16 |
| Birmingham City | 2002–03 | Premier League | 16 | 0 | 0 | 0 | 0 | 0 | — | | 16 | 0 |
| Birmingham City | 2003–04 | Premier League | 25 | 0 | 1 | 0 | 1 | 0 | — | | 27 | 0 |
| Birmingham City | 2004–05 | Premier League | 27 | 0 | 2 | 0 | 2 | 0 | — | | 31 | 0 |
| Birmingham City | 2005–06 | Premier League | 16 | 1 | 3 | 0 | 4 | 0 | — | | 23 | 1 |
| Birmingham City | Total | | 84 | 1 | 6 | 0 | 7 | 0 | 0 | 0 | 97 | 1 |
| Wolverhampton Wanderers | 2006–07 | Championship | 26 | 0 | 1 | 0 | 1 | 0 | 0 | 0 | 28 | 0 |
| Wolverhampton Wanderers | 2007–08 | Championship | 0 | 0 | 0 | 0 | 1 | 0 | — | | 1 | 0 |
| Wolverhampton Wanderers | Total | | 26 | 0 | 1 | 0 | 2 | 0 | 0 | 0 | 29 | 0 |
| Leeds United (loan) | 2007–08 | League One | 13 | 0 | 1 | 0 | 0 | 0 | 1 (Note: Appearance in Football League Trophy) | 0 | 15 | 0 |
| Leicester City | 2007–08 | Championship | 11 | 0 | 0 | 0 | 0 | 0 | — | | 11 | 0 |
| Notts County | 2008–09 | League Two | 40 | 2 | 3 | 0 | 0 | 0 | 0 | 0 | 43 | 2 |
| Notts County | 2009–10 | League Two | 30 | 1 | 5 | 0 | 1 | 0 | 1 | 0 | 37 | 1 |
| Notts County | Total | | 70 | 3 | 8 | 0 | 1 | 0 | 1 | 0 | 80 | 3 |
| Lincoln City | 2010–11 | League Two | 25 | 1 | 2 | 1 | 1 | 0 | 0 | 0 | 28 | 2 |
| Kettering Town | 2011–12 | Conference Premier | 3 | 0 | 0 | 0 | — | | 0 | 0 | 3 | 0 |
| Career total | | | 450 | 15 | 25 | 2 | 31 | 4 | 20 | 1 | 526 | 22 |

== Honours ==
Ipswich Town

- Football League First Division play-offs: 2000

Notts County

- Football League Two: 2009–10

Individual

- Ipswich Town Player of the Year: 1998–99
