= Martijn Reuser =

Dutch footballer (born 1975)

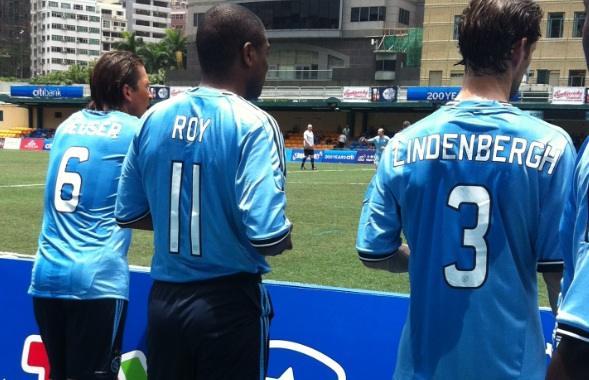
- Reuser (left) with Bryan Roy and Olaf Lindenbergh

Personal information
- Full name: Martijn Franciscus Reuser
- Date of birth: 1 February 1975 (age 51)
- Place of birth: Amsterdam, Netherlands
- Height: 1.75 m (5 ft 9 in)
- Position: Midfielder

Team information
- Current team: Netherlands U18 (manager); Netherlands U16 (assistant)

Youth career
- Rood Wit Amsterdam
- Ajax

Senior career*
Years	Team	Apps	(Gls)
1993–2000	Ajax	45	(6)
1997–1999	→ Vitesse (loan)	56	(14)
2000	→ Ipswich Town (loan)	8	(2)
2000–2004	Ipswich Town	83	(12)
2004–2006	Willem II	47	(14)
2006–2008	RKC Waalwijk	40	(11)
2008–2010	NAC Breda	37	(1)
Total		317	(60)

International career
1998	Netherlands	1	(0)

Managerial career
- 2012–2013: NAC Breda (U19 assistant)
- 2013–2014: NAC Breda (U12)
- 2014–2015: NAC Breda (U15)
- 2014–2016: Netherlands U15 (assistant)
- 2015–2016: ADO Den Haag (U17 assistant)
- 2016–2018: ADO Den Haag(U16)
- 2016–2018: Netherlands U16 (assistant)
- 2018–2019: Netherlands U15
- 2018–2020: Netherlands U19 (assistant)
- 2019–2021: Netherlands U16
- 2020–: Netherlands U18
- 2021–: Netherlands U16 (assistant)
- * Club domestic league appearances and goals

Martijn Franciscus Reuser (born 1 February 1975) is a Dutch former professional footballer who played top-flight football in both the Netherlands and England as a midfielder. He made one appearance for the Netherlands national team.

== Career ==
Born in Amsterdam, Reuser began his career at Dutch club Ajax and, having joined at youth level, made the step up to play in the first team. He was a skilful, goal-scoring midfielder who looked capable of being a permanent fixture in the Dutch national setup. His career was looking very promising, but he suffered a serious knee injury, which appeared to end his Ajax career. He moved to another Dutch side, Vitesse. It was here that Reuser made his one and only international appearance against Ghana in a friendly. He did not really hit it off at Vitesse and was re-signed by Ajax.

He made only one appearance for the first team and he was loaned to English club Ipswich Town in the 1999–2000 season after being scouted by Romeo Zondervan. Having scored a late winner on his début against Fulham and a memorable goal to seal off Ipswich's play-off win against Barnsley at Wembley, Ipswich signed him on a permanent basis. During his four-year stay at Portman Road he established a reputation as a free-kick taker. He was troubled by injury problems during his Ipswich Town career. Despite this, he managed to score six goals in his first full season with the club, establishing himself as one of the most dangerous attacking midfielders in the Premier League, helping Ipswich to an impressive fifth-place finish in the 2000–01 season and a return for the club to UEFA Cup football. After that, however, the injuries really set in. Ipswich were relegated the following season and he also fell out with new manager Joe Royle.

Reuser left Ipswich and joined Willem II for the 2004–05 season. He was less troubled by injury in the Netherlands, but he missed two months of the season with Achilles tendon problems. He was still the club's top scorer as the team finished 11th in the table. The following season was more difficult for Willem II. Reuser spent a lot of the season on the sidelines, and the side finished 16th in the table, which meant play-offs again for Reuser. He saved his side, with a hat-trick in their semi-final against FC Zwolle. Reuser signed for another Dutch side RKC Waalwijk for the 2006–07 season. He played for NAC Breda in the 2009–10 season. In January 2012, Reuser was linked with a return to former club Ipswich Town.

== Coaching career ==
Reuser started his coaching career in the 2012–13 season, where he worked as an assistant coach for NAC Breda's U19 squad. During 2013, Reuser also did an internship at Ajax. In the 2013–14 season, Reuser was in charge of NAC's U12 squad.

Ahead of the 2014–15 season, Reuser was in charge of NAC's U15s. Besides that, he was also appointed assistant manager of the Dutch U15 national team.

Beside his job for the Dutch U15 national team, Reuser joined ADO Den Haag in June 2015 as assistant coach for their U17s. In the summer 2016, Reuser took charge of ADO's U16s.

After leaving ADO in June 2018, Reuser worked in several roles for the Dutch youth national teams.

== Career statistics ==
=== Club ===
Appearances and goals by club, season and competition
Club	Season	League			National Cup (Note: Includes appearances in FA Cup and KNVB Cup)		League Cup (Note: Includes appearances in EFL Cup)		Europe		Other		Total	
Club	Season	Division	Apps	Goals	Apps	Goals	Apps	Goals	Apps	Goals	Apps	Goals	Apps	Goals
Ajax	1993–94	Eredivisie	2	0	1	0	—		1 (Note: Appearance in UEFA Cup Winners' Cup)	0	0	0	4	0
Ajax	1994–95	Eredivisie	2	0	0	0	—		0	0	0	0	2	0
Ajax	1995–96	Eredivisie	18	3	0	0	—		4 (Note: Appearances in UEFA Champions League)	0	2 (Note: One appearance in Johan Cruyff Shield, one appearance in Intercontinental Cup)	0	24	3
Ajax	1996–97	Eredivisie	19	3	0	0	—		3	0	0	0	22	3
Ajax	1997–98	Eredivisie	1	0	0	0	—		0	0	0	0	1	0
Ajax	1998–99	Eredivisie	0	0	0	0	—		0	0	0	0	0	0
Ajax	1999–00	Eredivisie	3	0	0	0	—		2 (Note: Appearance(s) in UEFA Cup)	1	0	0	5	1
Ajax	Total		45	6	1	0	0	0	10	1	2	0	58	7
Vitesse (loan)	1997–98	Eredivisie	24	6	0	0	—		0	0	—		24	6
Vitesse (loan)	1998–99	Eredivisie	32	8	2	2	—		4	1	—		38	11
Vitesse (loan)	Total		56	14	2	2	0	0	4	1	0	0	62	17
Ipswich Town (loan)	1999–00	First Division	8	2	0	0	0	0	—		3 (Note: Appearance(s) in First Division play-offs)	2	11	4
Ipswich Town	2000–01	Premier League	26	6	1	0	7	0	—		—		34	6
Ipswich Town	2001–02	Premier League	24	1	2	0	1	2	3	0	—		30	3
Ipswich Town	2002–03	First Division	16	2	1	0	0	0	1	0	—		18	2
Ipswich Town	2003–04	First Division	17	3	2	1	1	0	—		1	0	21	4
Ipswich Town	Total		91	14	6	1	9	2	4	0	4	2	114	19
Willem II	2004–05	Eredivisie	27	9	2	0	—		—		—		34	6
Willem II	2005–06	Eredivisie	20	5	0	0	—		2	0	0	0	22	5
Willem II	Total		47	14	2	0	0	0	2	0	0	0	51	14
RKC Waalwijk	2006–07	Eredivisie	20	1	0	0	—		—		0	0	20	1
RKC Waalwijk	2007–08	Eerste Divisie	20	10	0	0	—		—		0	0	20	10
RKC Waalwijk	Total		40	11	0	0	0	0	0	0	0	0	40	11
NAC Breda	2008–09	Eredivisie	21	1	4	1	—		3 (Note: Appearances in UEFA Europa League play-offs)	1	—		28	3
NAC Breda	2009–10	Eredivisie	15	0	1	0	—		3 (Note: Appearances in UEFA Europa League)	0	—		16	0
NAC Breda	Total		36	1	5	1	0	0	6	1	0	0	44	3
Career total			315	60	16	4	9	2	26	3	6	2	372	71

=== International ===
Appearances and goals by national team and year
National team	Year	Apps	Goals
Netherlands	1998	1	0
Total		1	0

== Honours ==
Ajax

- Eredivisie: 1993–94, 1994–95, 1995–96, 1997–98
- Johan Cruyff Shield: 1995
- Intercontinental Cup: 1995
- UEFA Champions League: 1995

Ipswich Town

- Football League First Division play-offs: 2000
