= Wayne Brown (footballer, born August 1977) =

English footballer (born 1977)

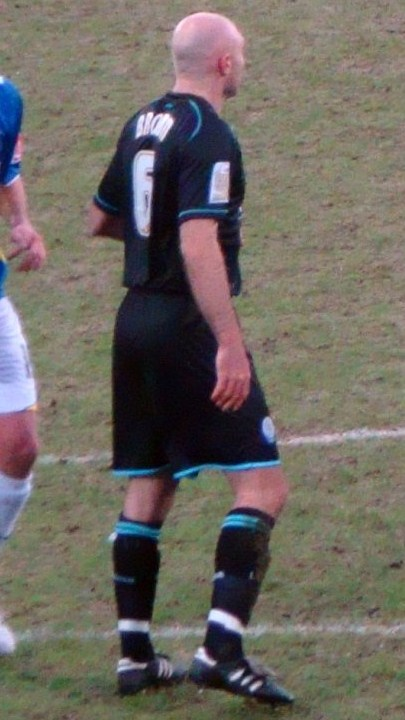
- Brown playing for Leicester City in 2010

Personal information
- Full name: Wayne Lawrence Brown
- Date of birth: 20 August 1977 (age 49)
- Place of birth: Barking, London, England
- Height: 1.83 m (6 ft 0 in)
- Position: Defender

Youth career
- 1993–1997: Ipswich Town

Senior career*
Years	Team	Apps	(Gls)
1997–2002	Ipswich Town	40	(0)
1997	→ Colchester United (loan)	2	(0)
2001	→ Queens Park Rangers (loan)	2	(0)
2001	→ Wimbledon (loan)	17	(1)
2002	→ Watford (loan)	11	(3)
2002–2004	Watford	25	(1)
2003	→ Gillingham (loan)	4	(1)
2004	→ Colchester United (loan)	16	(0)
2004–2007	Colchester United	124	(4)
2007–2009	Hull City	42	(1)
2008	→ Preston North End (loan)	6	(0)
2009	→ Leicester City (loan)	9	(0)
2009–2010	Leicester City	39	(0)
2010–2011	Preston North End	13	(0)
2011	Bury Town	0	(0)
Total		350	(11)

Managerial career
- 2015: Colchester United (caretaker)
- 2018–2022: Maldon & Tiptree
- 2021: Colchester United (caretaker)
- 2022: Colchester United
- * Club domestic league appearances and goals

Wayne Lawrence Brown (born 20 August 1977) is an English football coach and former player who was most recently manager of Colchester United.

Brown began his playing career with Ipswich Town where he progressed through the club's Academy. He made his professional debut on loan at Colchester United in 1997, going on to make 40 league appearances for Ipswich. He also had loan spells with Queens Park Rangers, Wimbledon and Watford, before permanently moving to the latter in 2002. He made 25 league appearances for Watford in two years with the club, failing to establish himself in the first team. Brown was again loaned out to Gillingham in 2003, and once more to Colchester in 2004. He sealed a move to Colchester following his loan, where he made over 120 league appearances and helped guide the club to the Championship for the first time in their history in 2006. He was also named the club's Player of the Year for his efforts.

After one season in the Championship with Colchester, Brown moved to Hull City for £450,000, spending two years with the side. However, he failed to make a mark in the first-team, making 42 league appearances, though he did help the club to promotion to the Premier League via the play-offs in 2008. He was twice loaned out by the club, to Preston North End, and Leicester City. During his loan period with Leicester, Brown was a member of the League One title-winning team. He joined Leicester permanently in the summer of 2009, but spent just one season with the club as they reached the Championship play-off places. Brown rejoined Preston in 2010 after leaving Leicester by mutual consent. He could only manage 13 league appearances in the 2010–11 season. After being deemed surplus to requirements, Brown finally wound down his playing career with local side Bury Town in 2011.

Brown returned to Colchester United in 2012 in a coaching role, assisting John McGreal in managing the under-16 side, before later being appointed joint-manager of the under-18 side alongside McGreal. Brown spent three matches as caretaker manager of Colchester in December 2015, although he returned to his under-18s coaching role following the appointment of Kevin Keen as manager. He has since managed the Colchester United under-23 side and was then appointed manager at Maldon & Tiptree.

During the 2020–21 Isthmian League season, with the season suspended due to the ongoing COVID-19 pandemic, Brown was again named interim manager at Colchester United following the exit of Steve Ball from the role.

== Playing career ==
=== Ipswich Town ===
Born in Barking, London, Brown joined the Ipswich Town Academy in March 1993. He progressed through the youth team, eventually making his professional debut on 18 October 1997 while on a month-long loan with Third Division side Colchester United. He made two substitute appearances for Colchester, before he made his Ipswich debut on 17 January 1998 in their 1–1 First Division draw with Middlesbrough at the Riverside Stadium. He made just one first-team appearance for Ipswich in the 1998–99 season as a late substitute in their 2–1 win over Sheffield United at Bramall Lane.

Brown began to establish himself in the Town first-team during their 1999–2000 promotion-winning season. He made 30 appearances in all competitions, including both play-off legs against Bolton Wanderers, though he was an unused substitute in the final. He was the first player to receive the John Kerridge Memorial Trophy which recognised him as the most improved Ipswich player for the season.

Brown made just four substitute appearances in the Premiership during the 2000–01 season, and was instead loaned out to First Division Queens Park Rangers until the end of the season in March 2001. He made two appearances for QPR before returning to Ipswich.

Wimbledon signed Brown on a three-month loan deal in September 2001, during which time he scored his first professional goal. He opened the scoring in a 4–0 win for the Dons over Crewe Alexandra on 18 September. He made 17 league appearances for Wimbledon, before returning to Ipswich for their FA Cup third round 4–1 win over Dagenham & Redbridge on 5 January 2002, which was to be his only appearance for his parent club during the course of the campaign. Before the end of January, Brown was on the move again, on this occasion on loan to Watford. In his eleven games for Watford, Brown scored three times; once in a 1–1 draw with West Bromwich Albion on 5 March 2002, and his second and third during a comprehensive 3–0 win over Coventry City eleven days later in his last appearance of his loan for the club.

Brown scored his first and only goal of his Ipswich Town career on 29 August 2002 in their 8–1 UEFA Cup win against Avenir Beggen. Brown featured regularly in the early stages of the 2002–03 season, but would make his final Ipswich appearance on 3 November 2002 as Town fell to a 2–1 defeat to Crystal Palace at Portman Road. Brown made 52 appearances for Ipswich.

=== Watford ===
Brown signed for Watford on a free transfer on 18 December 2002, signing a three-and-a-half-year deal with the Hornets. Owing to Watford's financial difficulties, a member of the Watford board had agreed to pay Brown's wages for the first six months of his contract. He made his debut against his former club Wimbledon on Boxing Day in a goalless draw. Brown scored his only goal of his second Watford stint on 5 April 2003 in their 7–4 away win against Burnley.

After failing to make an appearance for Watford in the 2003–04 season, Brown was loaned out to Gillingham for one month on 19 September 2003. He made his debut on 20 September in a 2–0 win over West Ham United, and scored his only goal of his four-game stint on 29 September in a 2–1 away defeat by Walsall. Brown returned to the first-team at Watford and made regular appearances until Christmas 2003. He was then loaned to Colchester United for the second time on 12 February 2004 until the end of the season, making his second debut in the Essex derby in a 1–1 Football League Trophy Area Final 1–1 draw with Southend United. During his stint, he received the first red card of his career for a second bookable offence in Colchester's 2–1 Second Division defeat to Brighton & Hove Albion on 20 March. He made 17 appearances for the U's.

=== Colchester United ===
Brown signed for Phil Parkinson's Colchester United on a permanent basis ahead of the 2004–05 season following his successful loan at the end of the previous season. He made what was his third debut for the club on 7 August 2004 in Colchester's opening day 3–0 win over Sheffield Wednesday at Hillsborough. He scored once in a 2–2 draw at Wrexham on 22 February 2005 as he went on to make 47 appearances in all competitions.

During the 2005–06 season Brown helped his side to second position in the League One table, earning promotion to the Championship for the first time in the club's history. He made 45 appearances in all competitions. He had received only his second-ever dismissal on 3 September 2005 during Colchester's goalless draw at Bristol City. He scored three times during the season, with a goal in Colchester's record-equalling 9–1 victory over Leamington in the FA Cup first round, another in their 5–0 win at Layer Road against his former side Gillingham, and in a 1–0 home victory against Tranmere Rovers. He was named as Colchester United Player of the Year at the end of the season.

Brown's good form continued into Colchester's inaugural season in English football's second tier, guiding the side to their highest-ever league finish of 10th position in the Championship. He appeared 48 times, scoring once in Colchester's 3–1 home win against Sunderland on 21 April 2007. With one year remaining on his contract, Brown put in a transfer request during the summer of 2007.

=== Hull City ===
With Brown demanding a move away from Layer Road and an opportunity to speak to Hull City, Colchester reluctantly accepted an offer from Hull for Brown. His transfer was completed on 14 July 2007, signing a three-year contract for a £450,000 fee. In his first season with Hull, Brown helped them win promotion to the Premier League following a 1–0 win against Bristol City in the 2008 play-off final. Brown scored once during the course of the season with a goal in Hull's 3–1 win over his boyhood club Ipswich on 29 September 2007. He made 47 appearances across the campaign.

After just one Premier League and one League Cup appearance in the first three months of the 2008–09 season, Brown joined Preston North End on loan for a month, having been found surplus to requirements at his parent club. Brown made six appearances for Preston through October and November 2008, before being loaned out once again by Hull.

On 30 January 2009, Brown joined League One promotion hopefuls Leicester City on loan for the remainder of the 2008–09 season with a view to a permanent transfer in the summer. He made nine appearances for Leicester as he helped them to regain promotion to the Championship as League One champions after beating Southend United 2–0 on 18 April 2009.

=== Leicester City ===
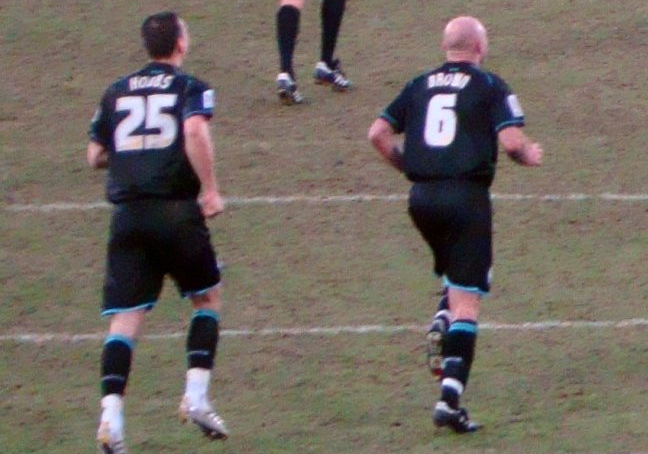
Jack Hobbs and Wayne Brown playing for Leicester City in January 2010.

Ten days after helping the club to the League One title, Brown signed a two-year contract with the club for an undisclosed fee. He made his second debut for the club on 8 August 2009 in Leicester's 2–1 win at home to Swansea City and went on to make 39 Championship appearances for Leicester during the course of the season.

During the close season, Brown left the club to sign for Preston North End, after being internally suspended following a dressing-room incident in which he announced to his teammates (including non-white players) that he intended to vote for the British National Party in that year's general election, and claimed that ethnic minorities were "killing this country". Brown later commented that "I have never voted for the political party in question and in no way, shape or form do I hold racist views".

=== Preston North End ===
Preston North End manager Darren Ferguson brought Brown to the club following his mutually agreed release from Leicester on 6 July 2010. He made his second Preston debut on 18 September in their 1–0 home defeat by Norwich City, going on to make 13 appearances between his debut and the beginning of January 2011. However, following Ferguson's dismissal as manager and his reunion with newly appointed former Hull City manager Phil Brown on 6 January 2011, Wayne would make just one further substitute appearance in February 2011. Phil Brown had told Wayne that he would not be considered for selection, and he was one of five players released by the club at the end of the season following Preston's relegation to League One.

=== Bury Town ===
After being released by Preston, Brown began training with Football League clubs Peterborough United, Bradford City and his former side Colchester United. However, he decided to sign for his former teammate at Colchester Richard Wilkins, who was managing Isthmian League side Bury Town at the time. Brown signed on 18 October 2011, turning down offers from Football League sides in order to not uproot his young family and reluctance to be a squad player. He also said that he was becoming more involved in his family business, and that his wife was expecting a baby in December. The terms with Bury allowed Brown to leave in January 2012 if a Football League club came in for him that would be financially and geographically suitable for Brown.

Brown made his debut for Bury in their Isthmian League Cup first round win at home to Harlow Town on 18 October, keeping a clean sheet and playing the full 90-minutes of the 1–0 victory. He played his next and what would be his final game for the club in an FA Trophy first qualifying round match against Aveley on 22 October, but was replaced by Roscoe Hipperson after just 16-minutes due to injury. Brown remained out of action for the remainder of 2011, suffering from a recurrence of a calf injury and illness.

== Coaching career ==
Brown returned to Colchester United in a coaching capacity at the club's Academy, where he took up a full-time role in 2013. He was later appointed manager of the under-18 side alongside his former Ipswich Town teammate John McGreal, and led the side to the Football League Youth Alliance South East title and won the Youth Alliance Cup in April 2014. Following Richard Hall's promotion to assistant manager in September 2014, McGreal stepped up to replace Hall as under-21s manager, while Brown remained in-charge of the under-18s. Academy coach Steve Ball was promoted to jointly manage the under-18s alongside Brown.

Brown was named as assistant to joint-caretaker managers Richard Hall and John McGreal at Colchester United following Tony Humes dismissal as manager on 26 November 2015. However, following a 5–1 defeat against Burton Albion in their only match in charge, Brown was appointed as caretaker manager on 2 December. Brown led his side to a 3–2 win in his first match in charge in the FA Cup second round against Altrincham on 6 December, However, after two games managing the side, Brown dropped out of the running to become the next permanent manager following a long discussion with club chairman Robbie Cowling. Brown said "I don't feel ready and this football club needs a manager that is going into the job backing himself 100 per cent". Following the appointment of Kevin Keen as permanent U's manager, Brown reverted to his role as under-18 coach.

Following a shake-up of Colchester's backroom staff and John McGreal's subsequent promotion to first-team manager in May 2016, Brown was named as the new manager of the Colchester United under-21 side. Brown and Kevin Horlock then switched roles in May 2018, with Horlock replacing Brown as under-23 manager, and Brown taking charge of Isthmian League North Division side Maldon & Tiptree.

On 24 February 2021, with the 2020–21 Isthmian League suspended due to the ongoing COVID-19 pandemic, Brown was named interim manager of Colchester United for a second spell, following Steve Ball's exit from the role. He was replaced by Hayden Mullins from 31 March after one win in nine games.

On 19 January 2022, following the departure of Mullins, Brown was again named interim manager of Colchester United. With Brown having steered the club away from relegation and to a mid-table finish, he was given the job on a permanent basis on 17 May 2022. On 18 September 2022, following a home defeat to Grimsby, Brown was sacked as head coach of Colchester.

== Playing statistics ==
Appearances and goals by club, season and competition
Club	Season	League			FA Cup		League Cup		Europe		Other		Total	
Club	Season	Division	Apps	Goals	Apps	Goals	Apps	Goals	Apps	Goals	Apps	Goals	Apps	Goals
Ipswich Town	1997–98	First Division	1	0	0	0	0	0	—		—		1	0
Ipswich Town	1998–99	First Division	1	0	0	0	0	0	—		—		1	0
Ipswich Town	1999–2000	First Division	25	0	1	0	2	0	—		2 (Note: Appearances in Football League play-offs)	0	30	0
Ipswich Town	2000–01	Premiership	4	0	0	0	0	0	—		–		4	0
Ipswich Town	2001–02	Premiership	0	0	1	0	0	0	0	0	–		1	0
Ipswich Town	2002–03	First Division	9	0	–		1	0	3 (Note: Appearances in UEFA Cup)	1	—		13	1
Ipswich Town	Total		40	0	2	0	3	0	3	1	4	0	52	1
Colchester United (loan)	1997–98	Third Division	2	0	0	0	0	0	–		—		2	0
Queens Park Rangers (loan)	2000–01	First Division	2	0	0	0	0	0	–		—		2	0
Wimbledon (loan)	2001–02	First Division	17	1	–		0	0	–		—		17	1
Watford (loan)	2001–02	First Division	11	3	–		0	0	–		—		11	3
Watford	2002–03	First Division	13	1	1	0	0	0	–		—		14	1
Watford	2003–04	First Division	12	0	0	0	0	0	–		—		12	0
Watford	Total		25	1	1	0	0	0	–		–		26	1
Gillingham (loan)	2003–04	First Division	4	1	0	0	0	0	–		—		4	1
Colchester United (loan)	2003–04	Second Division	16	0	0	0	0	0	–		1 (Note: Appearance(s) in Football League Trophy)	0	17	0
Colchester United	2004–05	League One	42	1	3	0	1	0	–		1	0	47	1
Colchester United	2005–06	League One	38	2	4	1	1	0	–		2	0	45	3
Colchester United	2006–07	Championship	46	1	1	0	1	0	–		–		48	1
Colchester United	Total		124	4	8	1	5	0	–		3	0	140	5
Hull City	2007–08	Championship	41	1	0	0	3	0	–		3	0	47	1
Hull City	2008–09	Premier League	1	0	0	0	1	0	–		–		2	0
Hull City	Total		42	1	0	0	4	0	–		3	0	49	1
Preston North End (loan)	2008–09	Championship	6	0	0	0	–		–		–		6	0
Leicester City (loan)	2008–09	League One	9	0	0	0	–		–		–		9	0
Leicester City	2009–10	Championship	39	0	1	0	0	0	–		–		40	0
Preston North End	2010–11	Championship	13	0	0	0	1	0	–		–		14	0
Bury Town	2011–12	Isthmian League Premier Division	0	0	0	0	–		–		2 (Note: Appearance in Isthmian League Cup) (Note: Appearance in FA Trophy)	0	2	0
Career total			352	11	12	1	11	0	3	1	11	0	389	13

== Managerial statistics ==
As of 17 September 2022

Managerial record by team and tenure
Team	From	To	Record				
Team	From	To	P	W	D	L	Win %
Colchester United (caretaker)	2 December 2015	21 December 2015	3	1	0	2	33.3
Maldon & Tiptree	22 May 2018	17 May 2022	141	96	16	29	68.1
Colchester United (caretaker)	24 February 2021	31 March 2021	9	1	3	5	11.1
Colchester United	19 January 2022	18 September 2022	34	12	9	13	35.3
Total			182	102	31	49	56.04

== Honours ==
Ipswich Town

- Football League First Division play-offs: 2000

Hull City

- Football League Championship play-offs: 2008

Leicester City

- Football League One: 2008–09

Individual

- Colchester United Player of the Year: 2006
