= Alun Armstrong (footballer) =

English footballer & manager (born 1975)

Personal information
- Full name: Alun Armstrong
- Date of birth: 22 February 1975 (age 51)
- Place of birth: Gateshead, England
- Height: 6 ft 1 in (1.85 m)
- Position: Forward

Team information
- Current team: Gateshead

Youth career
- –1993: Newcastle United

Senior career*
Years	Team	Apps	(Gls)
1993–1994	Newcastle United	0	(0)
1994–1998	Stockport County	160	(49)
1998–2000	Middlesbrough	29	(9)
2000	→ Huddersfield Town (loan)	6	(0)
2000–2004	Ipswich Town	79	(14)
2003–2004	→ Bradford City (loan)	6	(1)
2004–2005	Darlington	32	(9)
2005–2006	Rushden & Diamonds	9	(0)
2006	→ Doncaster Rovers (loan)	6	(0)
2006–2007	Darlington	29	(1)
2007	Newcastle Blue Star	1	(0)
Total		357	(83)

Managerial career
- 2016–2019: Blyth Spartans
- 2019–2023: Darlington
- 2025–2026: Gateshead
- 2026–: Gateshead
- * Club domestic league appearances and goals

Alun Armstrong (born 22 February 1975) is an English former professional footballer and manager. During his playing career, Armstrong operated primarily as a forward. He is currently manager of National League club Gateshead.

His career as a player, which ran between 1993 and 2007, included spells at Newcastle United, Stockport County, Middlesbrough, Ipswich Town, two spells at Darlington, Rushden & Diamonds and concluding it with a brief spell at Newcastle Blue Star. He has also enjoyed loan spells at Huddersfield Town, Bradford City and Doncaster Rovers.

Armstrong entered into club management in 2016, joining Blyth Spartans, achieving promotion to the National League North in his first season in charge. He left the club in 2019, agreeing to join Darlington as their new manager.

== Playing career ==
Armstrong's first club was Newcastle United, where in October 1993 he came up from their youth team. He left in June 1994 having not played a competitive game for them, and signed with Stockport County for £50,000. In 200 games for them, he scored 62 goals. In February 1998 he joined Middlesbrough for £1.6m. He stayed until 2000, when in March he joined Huddersfield Town for three months on loan. In December 2000 he joined Ipswich Town for £500,000. In the three years he was at Ipswich he scored 19 goals in 94 appearances, including a header in Ipswich's 1–0 win over Inter Milan in the 2001–02 UEFA Cup. Armstrong described the goal as "probably the most important of my career, as long as we get a result out there (In the return leg)". Despite Armstrong scoring another goal in the return leg from the penalty spot, Ipswich were knocked out with an aggregate score of 4–2.

From December 2003 until March 2004 he was on loan to Bradford City, scoring once against Norwich City, and in September 2004 he joined Darlington on a free transfer. He left Darlington in June 2005, to join Rushden & Diamonds. He scored once for Rushden, his goal coming against Halifax Town in the FA Cup. After a spell on loan at Doncaster Rovers, he re-signed for Darlington in August 2006 to join the club on a second spell, before leaving them again at the end of the 2006–07 season. He scored once in his second spell at Darlington, against Hereford. He signed for Newcastle Blue Star in the UniBond Division One North before quitting days after receiving a red card against Gateshead.

== Managerial career ==
=== Blyth Spartans ===
On 22 September 2016, Armstrong was appointed as the new manager of Northern Premier League Premier Division side Blyth Spartans. In his first season in charge of the Green Army, he guided them to win the league title at the first attempt, achieving National League North status for the first time since their relegation from the sixth tier at the end of the 2011–12 season.

In their first season back in the National League divisions, Armstrong led Spartans to a tenth-placed finish, four points adrift from play-off qualification. In their following league campaign, Armstrong's side saw a huge boost of form, eventually concluding the season in sixth place, qualifying for the divisional play-off quarter-finals, his side failed to continue to the semi-finals after defeat to Altrincham on penalties, having recorded a 2–2 draw prior though extra time could not see Spartans push for victory.

=== Darlington ===
On 21 May 2019, Armstrong was appointed as the new manager of fellow National League North club Darlington, replacing Tommy Wright.

An impressive start to the 2022–23 season saw Armstrong awarded the National League North Manager of the Month award for September 2022, winning all four of their matches across the month and climbing to 3rd position from 17th at the start of the month.

On 6 September 2023, with Darlington languishing at the bottom of the National League North Table, Alun Armstrong and assistant Darren Holloway were sacked by the club.

=== Gateshead ===
On 16 June 2025, Armstrong was appointed manager of National League side Gateshead, having coached the club's under-19 side over the previous year.

On 2 January 2026, with Gateshead bottom of the National League, he requilinished his role as first-team manager to become Gateshead's Head of Football Development. Rob Elliot took over his role as manager at the club, guiding the Heed to safety in the 2025/26 season. Armstrong was reappointed for a second spell in charge on 17th November 2026, following the sacking of manager Lee Catterlmole & with the club sat bottom of the league, 13 points adrift & on the verge of a takeover by Flacks Group.

== Personal life ==
His son Luke is also a footballer with Carlisle United. He has another son Rhys, who is at Darlington.

== Career statistics ==
Appearances and goals by club, season and competition
Club	Season	League			FA Cup		League Cup		Other		Total	
Club	Season	Division	Apps	Goals	Apps	Goals	Apps	Goals	Apps	Goals	Apps	Goals
Stockport County	1994–95	Second Division	45	14	1	0	3	1	0	0	49	15
Stockport County	1995–96	Second Division	46	13	4	3	5	2	0	0	55	18
Stockport County	1996–97	Second Division	39	9	2	1	11	3	0	0	52	13
Stockport County	1997–98	First Division	29	12	2	1	3	2	—		34	15
Stockport County	Total		159	48	9	5	22	8	0	0	190	61
Middlesbrough	1997–98	First Division	11	7	0	0	0	0	—		11	7
Middlesbrough	1998–99	Premier League	6	1	0	0	0	0	—		6	1
Middlesbrough	1999–00	Premier League	12	1	0	0	3	0	—		15	1
Middlesbrough	2000–01	Premier League	0	0	0	0	1	0	—		1	0
Middlesbrough	Total		29	9	0	0	4	0	0	0	33	9
Huddersfield Town (loan)	1999–00	First Division	6	0	0	0	0	0	—		6	0
Ipswich Town	2000–01	Premier League	21	7	2	1	0	0	—		23	8
Ipswich Town	2001–02	Premier League	32	4	1	0	2	1	3 (Note: Appearances in UEFA Cup)	2	38	7
Ipswich Town	2002–03	First Division	19	1	0	0	1	0	4	1	24	2
Ipswich Town	2003–04	First Division	7	2	0	0	1	0	1 (Note: Appearance in First Division play-offs)	0	9	2
Ipswich Town	Total		79	14	3	1	4	1	8	3	94	19
Bradford City (loan)	2003–04	First Division	6	1	1	0	0	0	—		7	1
Darlington	2004–05	League Two	32	9	2	2	0	0	0	0	34	11
Rushden & Diamonds	2005–06	League Two	9	0	3	1	0	0	1 (Note: Appearance(s) in Football League Trophy play-offs)	0	13	1
Doncaster Rovers (loan)	2005–06	League One	6	0	0	0	0	0	0	0	6	0
Darlington	2006–07	League Two	29	1	2	0	0	0	2	0	33	1
Career total			355	82	20	9	30	9	11	3	416	103

== Managerial statistics ==
As of 21 November 2026

Team	Duration		Record					Source
Team	From	To	G	W	D	L	%	Source
Blyth Spartans	22 September 2016	21 May 2019	134	71	21	42	52.99	
Darlington	21 May 2019	6 September 2023	166	63	41	62	37.95	
Gateshead	16 June 2025	2 January 2026	32	7	5	20	21.88	
Gateshead	17 November 2026	Present	1	0	0	1	0.00	
Total			333	141	67	125	42.34	—

== Honours ==
=== As a player ===
Stockport County

- Football League Second Division runner-up: 1996–97

Middlesbrough

- Football League First Division runner-up: 1997–98

=== As a manager ===
Blyth Spartans

- 2016–17 Northern Premier League
- 2016-17 Northumberland Senior Cup

Individual

- National League North Manager of the Month: September 2022
