= Guillermo Graaven =

Dutch footballer

Personal information
- Full name: Guillermo Graaven
- Date of birth: 17 January 1982 (age 44)
- Place of birth: Amsterdam, Netherlands
- Height: 6 ft 0 in (1.83 m)
- Position: Forward

Youth career
- –2000: Ajax

Senior career*
Years	Team	Apps	(Gls)
2000–2001	Ipswich Town	0	(0)
2002–2003	TOP Oss	1	(0)
2003–2004	Stormvogels Telstar	6	(0)
2004–2005	ARC		
2005–2006	Huizen		
2006	AFC		
2006–2007	Türkiyemspor		
2007–2008	Lienden		
2008–2009	NVC		
2009–2010	Purmersteijn		

International career
1996-1997	Netherlands U16	8	(0)
1998	Netherlands U17	6	(1)
- * Club domestic league appearances and goals

Guillermo Graaven (born 17 January 1982) is a Dutch retired footballer who played as a forward.

== Club career ==
After progressing through the Ajax youth academy, he joined Ipswich Town with fellow Dutchman Nabil Abidallah. He left the English club without playing for the senior team. An injury in his first season and a false rape claim hampered his progress at the club.

He made his debut in professional football in his native country at TOP Oss after unsuccessful trials with Motherwell, Standard Liège and Anderlecht. Later, he played for other Dutch clubs at the Eerste Divisie and amateur leagues before retiring in 2010.

== International career ==
Graaven played six times for the Netherlands U-17. He played in all the three matches at the 1999 UEFA European Under-16 Championship qualifying where his team failed to qualify to the finals.
