= Mark Venus =

English footballer (born 1967)

Personal information
- Full name: Mark Venus
- Date of birth: 6 April 1967 (age 59)
- Place of birth: Hartlepool, England
- Height: 6 ft 0 in (1.83 m)
- Position: Defender

Senior career*
Years	Team	Apps	(Gls)
1985	Hartlepool United	4	(0)
1985–1988	Leicester City	61	(1)
1988–1997	Wolverhampton Wanderers	287	(7)
1997–2003	Ipswich Town	148	(16)
2003–2004	Cambridge United	21	(0)
2004	→ Dagenham & Redbridge (loan)	5	(0)
2004	Hibernian	0	(0)
Total		526	(24)

Managerial career
- 2006: Hibernian (caretaker)
- 2013: Middlesbrough (caretaker)
- 2016: Coventry City (caretaker)
- 2024: Birmingham City (caretaker)
- * Club domestic league appearances and goals

Mark Venus (born 6 April 1967) is an English football coach and former player. As a player, he spent the majority of his career with Wolverhampton Wanderers and Ipswich Town. As a coach, he has served as assistant to Tony Mowbray at Hibernian, West Bromwich Albion, Celtic, Middlesbrough, Blackburn, Sunderland, Birmingham City and West Bromwich Albion.

== Playing career ==
His career started with his hometown team of Hartlepool United where he signed as a youngster in 1985. After a stay at Leicester City, he signed in 1987 for Wolverhampton Wanderers. Over nearly a decade at Molineux, Venus was an integral part of the club's resurrection after bankruptcy. Playing left back and, occasionally in his preferred position of central defence, Venus helped Wolves to Divisions Four and Three championships.

He joined Ipswich Town in 1997 after being exchanged for Steve Sedgley. With Ipswich Town he won the 1999–2000 First Division play-offs, and then finished 5th in the Premier League, qualifying for the UEFA Cup. Ipswich were relegated in 2001–02, but Venus picked up the club's Player of the Year award. He was given a free transfer by Ipswich Town manager Joe Royle at the end of 2002–03.

Whilst playing for Cambridge United in 2003–04, he fell out with the club and played the rest of that season on loan to Dagenham & Redbridge.

== Coaching career ==
Venus was hired as Hibernian assistant manager by his former Ipswich Town teammate Tony Mowbray in 2004. Venus also registered as a player for Hibs, but played in only one match before ending his playing career. Their contracts were extended in September 2006.

Venus returned to the West Midlands in October 2006 by following Mowbray to West Bromwich Albion. Their first game in charge was a Black Country derby against Wolves, where Venus had spent the bulk of his playing career. They had their contract extended until June 2011 in February 2008.

Venus was appointed Celtic assistant manager on 16 June 2009, again following Mowbray. After Mowbray was sacked as Celtic manager in March 2010, Venus and Peter Grant also left the club.

Venus was appointed assistant manager of Middlesbrough on 26 October 2010, working again with Mowbray. After Mowbray was sacked by Middlesbrough in October 2013, Venus was made caretaker manager. Middlesbrough chairman Steve Gibson commented that Venus was on the shortlist of candidates to be the next permanent manager. On 25 October he led Middlesbrough to a 4–0 win over Doncaster Rovers. Mark Venus' tenure as caretaker manager came to an end on 13 November when Aitor Karanka was appointed as the new Middlesbrough head coach.

Venus joined Coventry City in June 2015 as technical director. After the resignation of Tony Mowbray on 29 September 2016 he was made caretaker manager.

In June 2017, Venus was once again appointed assistant to Mowbray, taking charge of recently relegated League One club Blackburn Rovers. The duo guided the club straight back to the Championship, a 1–0 victory over Doncaster Rovers in April 2018 securing their promotion. The duo departed the club at the end of the 2021–22 season.

In September 2022, he once again reunited with Mowbray, appointed his assistant head coach at Championship club Sunderland. Following Mowbray's sacking in December 2023, Venus also departed the club.

In January 2024, just a month after his Sunderland departure, he was back in football following Mowbray to Birmingham City as assistant manager. After Mowbray temporarily stepped down for medical reasons on 19 February, Venus took over as caretaker, and a month later, when Mowbray took formal medical leave and Gary Rowett came in as interim manager, Venus also took extended leave. Mowbray confirmed in May that he would not be returning to Birmingham, and Venus left the club on 4 June.

== Personal life ==
Two medals awarded to Venus were stolen during a break-in at his house in the Morningside area of Edinburgh on 29 December 2010.

== Managerial statistics ==
As of match played 16 March 2024

Managerial record by team and tenure
Team	Nat	From	To	Record								Ref
Team	Nat	From	To	G	W	D	L	GF	GA	GD	Win %	Ref
Hibernian (caretaker)	Scotland	13 October 2006	16 October 2006	1	0	1	0	2	2	+0	0.00	
Middlesbrough (caretaker)	England	21 October 2013	13 November 2013	3	1	1	1	6	3	+3	33.33	
Coventry City (caretaker)	England	29 September 2016	21 December 2016	18	8	2	8	24	27	−3	44.44	
Birmingham City (caretaker)	England	19 February 2024	19 March 2024	6	0	1	5	5	11	−6	0.00	
Total				28	9	5	14	37	43	−6	32.14	—

== Honours ==
Wolverhampton Wanderers

- Football League Third Division: 1988–89

Ipswich Town

- Football League First Division play-offs: 2000

Individual

- Wolverhampton Wanderers Player of the Year: 1989–90
- PFA Team of the Year: 1998–99 First Division
- Ipswich Town Player of the Year: 2001–02
