= Matthew Robinson (footballer, born 1984) =

English footballer

Personal information
- Date of birth: 22 March 1984 (age 42)
- Place of birth: Newmarket, England
- Height: 5 ft 10 in (1.78 m)
- Position: Midfielder

Youth career
- 1999–2002: Ipswich Town

Senior career*
Years	Team	Apps	(Gls)
2002–2004	Ipswich Town	0	(0)
2004	Bournemouth	0	(0)
2004–2005	Cambridge United	18	(0)
2005	Cambridge City	29	(12)
Total		47	(12)
- * Club domestic league appearances and goals

Matthew Robinson (born 22 March 1984 in Ipswich, Suffolk, England) is an English footballer who played as a midfielder in the Football League.

== Career ==
Robinson came through the youth team of Ipswich Town and made 11 appearances scoring 12 goals for the youth team in the 2001–02 season. However, he failed to make a first team appearance at Portman Road and he signed non-contract terms at Football League One side Bournemouth, but was released after a month. He then signed for Football League Two team Cambridge United in February 2004. He played nine first team for United, but was released in January 2005, and joined local neighbours Cambridge City.
