= Ashley Nicholls =

English footballer (born 1981)

Personal information
- Full name: Ashley Joseph Nicholls
- Date of birth: 30 October 1981 (age 44)
- Place of birth: Ipswich, England
- Height: 5 ft 11 in (1.80 m)
- Position: Midfielder

Team information
- Current team: Maidenhead United

Youth career
- Ipswich Town

Senior career*
Years	Team	Apps	(Gls)
2000–2002	Ipswich Town	0	(0)
2002	→ Canvey Island (loan)	2	(1)
2002–2004	Darlington	67	(6)
2004	→ Cambridge United (loan)	16	(1)
2004–2006	Cambridge United	32	(0)
2005	→ Rushden & Diamonds (loan)	11	(0)
2006	→ Rushden & Diamonds (loan)	19	(0)
2006–2007	Grays Athletic	35	(0)
2007–2008	Boston United	16	(4)
2008–2009	Maidenhead United	41	(4)
2009–2010	Bishop's Stortford	16	(3)
2009–2010	→ Newport County (loan)	6	(0)
2010	Eastleigh	4	(0)
2010–2011	Maidenhead United	21	(1)
2011–2013	Dorchester Town	72	(3)
2013–2014	Bromley	33	(2)
2014–	Maidenhead United	0	(0)
- * Club domestic league appearances and goals as of 8:33, 25 June 2014 (UTC)

Ashley Joseph Nicholls (born 30 October 1981) is an English footballer who plays for Maidenhead United.

== Career ==
Nicholls was born in Ipswich and started his football career in the youth scheme of his home football club, Ipswich Town. In the spring of 2002, while in the youth scheme, he was loaned to Canvey Island where he played two games and scored one goal.

He was not offered a professional contract by Ipswich, so in the summer of 2002 he joined Darlington on a free transfer and stayed there for two seasons, playing 76 matches and scoring seven goals. He scored in his debut match for Darlington, against Cambridge United, his future team.

He was loaned to Cambridge United in February 2004 and joined permanently on a free transfer the following summer. His contract was due to run until the summer of 2006. As of the summer of 2005, he had played 47 matches for United, scoring once.

New Grays Athletic manager, Frank Gray signed Nicholls on a one-year deal at the start of the 2006–07 season. After a host of managers, Justin Edinburgh was finally implemented and did not see him in his future plans, releasing him in May 2007.

On 28 July 2007, he signed for Boston United after a successful trial. However, Nicholls departed at the end of the season.

Nicholls joined Conference South outfit Maidenhead United on 3 May 2008. After featuring in all but one game for The Magpies during the 2008–09 season, Nicholls signed for Bishop's Stortford on 30 May 2009.

In December 2009, Nicholls joined Conference South leaders Newport County on a one-month loan arrangement. His loan period at Newport concluded 29 February 2010. In March 2010, he joined Eastleigh. After leaving Dorchester Town, Nicholls joined Bromley on 5 June 2013. He scored his first goal for the club in a 3-1 friendly victory over Millwall on 23 July 2013, before netting again in Bromley's next pre-season match, a 2–0 win over rivals Welling United. He scored his first league goal for the club in a 3–0 home win over Staines Town on 14 September 2013. His next goal came in a 2–0 victory at home to Havant & Waterlooville on 23 November 2013.
