= Marcus Stewart =

English footballer

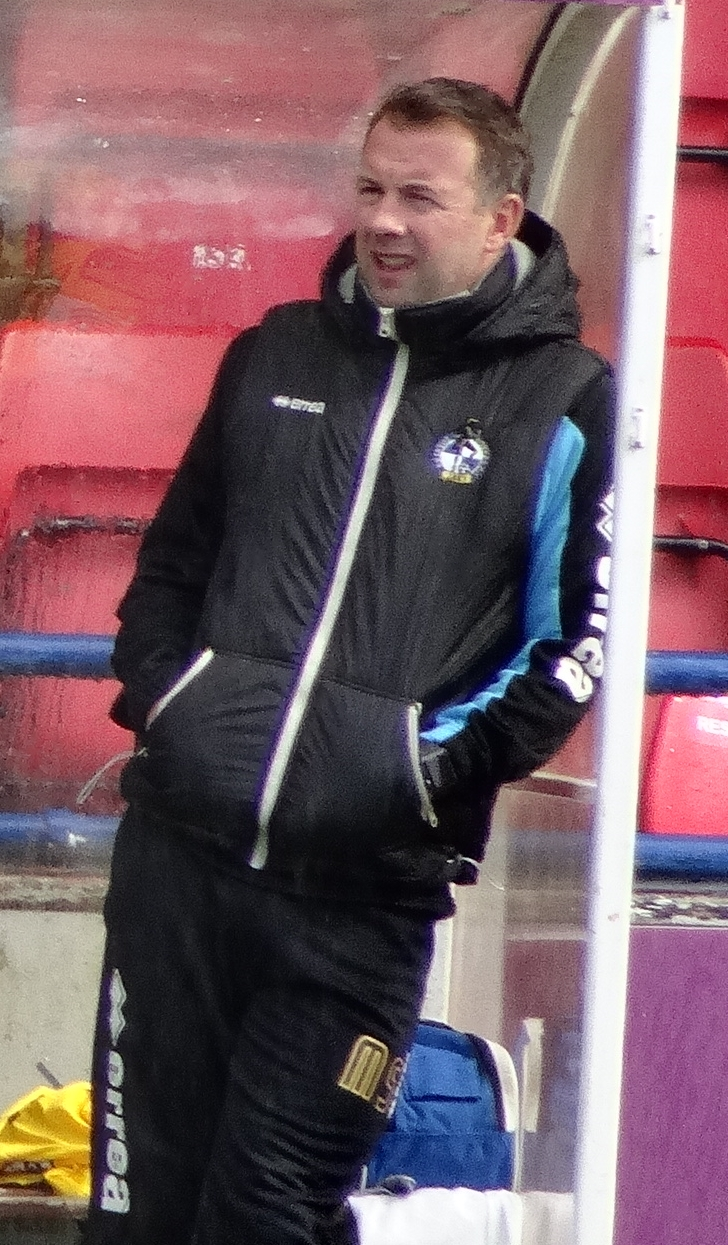
- Stewart with Bristol Rovers in 2016

Personal information
- Full name: William Marcus Paul Stewart
- Birth name: William Marcus Paul Tubbs
- Date of birth: 7 November 1972 (age 53)
- Place of birth: Bristol, England
- Height: 1.78 m (5 ft 10 in)
- Position: Striker

Senior career*
Years	Team	Apps	(Gls)
1991–1996	Bristol Rovers	171	(57)
1996–2000	Huddersfield Town	133	(58)
2000–2002	Ipswich Town	75	(27)
2002–2005	Sunderland	102	(31)
2005–2007	Bristol City	27	(5)
2006	→ Preston North End (loan)	4	(0)
2006	→ Yeovil Town (loan)	11	(5)
2007–2008	Yeovil Town	56	(7)
2008–2011	Exeter City	85	(9)
Total		664	(199)
- * Club domestic league appearances and goals

William Marcus Paul Stewart (né Tubbs; born 7 November 1972) is an English former professional footballer who played as a forward from 1991 until 2011.

Stewart played over 500 games and scored over 250 goals in his professional career and had notable spells in the Premier League for Ipswich Town and Sunderland, and was the Premier League's second highest goalscorer for the 2000–01 season. He also played for Bristol Rovers, Huddersfield Town, Bristol City, Preston North End, Yeovil Town and Exeter City.

== Playing career ==
=== Bristol Rovers ===
Stewart signed for Bristol Rovers in 1991, where he played as a regular striker. He had played for England schoolboys. He scored a volley in the 1995 Football League Second Division play-off final against Huddersfield Town but Rovers lost 2–1. Stewart's goal was his 24th of the season.

=== Huddersfield Town ===
The next season Huddersfield signed him for £1.2 million. He was a great fan favourite at Huddersfield before being controversially sold to rivals Ipswich Town for £2.5 million in the final run-in at the end of the 1999–2000 season. He was Ipswich's most expensive signing at the time.

=== Ipswich Town ===
Ipswich were promoted to the Premier League at the end of the season ahead of Huddersfield due in no small part to Stewart's goals, with two crucially coming in the 2–2 draw at Bolton Wanderers in the play-off semi-final away leg, and he then scored another in the play-off final itself. Following Ipswich's promotion, Huddersfield received a further £250,000. He continued his great form for the next season being the Premier League's second top goalscorer (and the division's highest English goalscorer) during 2000–01 with 19 goals for Ipswich, who finished fifth and qualified for the UEFA Cup and leading for many fans to call for him to be included in the England team. The following season saw Ipswich suffer a fall from grace that resulted in relegation, and although Stewart only notched up six league goals, he was still the team's OPTA player of the year for the second successive year.

=== Sunderland ===
Following Ipswich's fall from the Premier League, Stewart signed for Sunderland where he had three successful seasons. He played his last game for Sunderland on 8 May 2005, after a successful last season for the club which saw him score 17 goals. He departed Sunderland on good terms after deciding that he was too old to play to a Premier League standard.

=== Bristol City ===
Stewart chose to sign for Bristol City, fulfilling his ambition to play for the team which he has supported since he was a boy despite beginning his career with City's neighbours and rivals Bristol Rovers. In March 2006, Stewart moved on-loan to Preston North End until the end of the 2005–06 season. After his return to Bristol he was publicly told by City's manager and chairman that he should seek another club, though he was not formally transfer-listed. In August 2006 he signed for Yeovil Town on a three-month loan and scored a goal on his debut away at Swansea City. He signed a permanent deal with Yeovil in January 2007.

=== Exeter City ===
Stewart signed a deal with newly promoted League Two side Exeter City on 14 July 2008.

In February 2009 he was a shock contender to fill the vacant manager's position at Yeovil Town, possibly teaming up with ex-Carlisle United boss John Ward.

Stewart finished the 2008–09 season scoring seven goals for Exeter, taking his career tally to 249 goals, one short of 250. After Exeter's promotion to league one in May 2009, Stewart decided to hold his retirement plans and sign a new one-year deal with the club.

He scored his 250th career goal in the League One game at Carlisle United on 22 August 2009.

Stewart retired from professional football in April 2011, his final appearance being as a substitute for Exeter in a 2–0 win against the first club of his career, Bristol Rovers.

== Coaching career ==
Stewart, already had been involved in some coaching duties as a senior player/coach in his final two years at Exeter City. After retiring from his playing career, he worked full-time as a first team coach for Exeter.

In July 2012 he joined former club Bristol Rovers as a development coach. In 2013 Stewart was made assistant manager at Bristol Rovers. He left the club by mutual consent in December 2018 along with then manager Darrell Clarke. On 20 May 2019, Stewart re-united with Clarke by joining Walsall as assistant manager.

On 8 June 2022, Stewart joined former club Yeovil Town as Head of Player Development, linking up with new manager Chris Hargreaves who Stewart had worked with at Bristol Rovers. In May 2025, Stewart left his role as Head of Player Development after three seasons at the club.

== Personal life ==
On 8 September 2022, Stewart was diagnosed with motor neurone disease following twelve months of testing. In May 2023, a charity match was held at the Memorial Stadium, home of one of his former clubs Bristol Rovers, in order to raise money for the Darby Rimmer MND Foundation.

== Honours ==
Ipswich Town

- Football League First Division play-offs: 2000

Sunderland

- Football League Championship: 2004–05

Exeter City

- Football League Two runner-up: 2008–09

Individual

- Bristol Rovers Player of the Year: 1995–96
- PFA Team of the Year: 1995–96 Second Division, 1999–2000 First Division
- Ipswich Town Player of the Year: 2000–01
- Ipswich Town Hall of Fame: Inducted 2023
