= Nabil Abidallah =

Dutch footballer (born 1982)

Personal information
- Date of birth: 5 August 1982 (age 44)
- Place of birth: Amsterdam, Netherlands
- Height: 1.70 m (5 ft 7 in)
- Positions: Midfielder; winger

Youth career
- 1999–2000: Ajax

Senior career*
Years	Team	Apps	(Gls)
2000–2004	Ipswich Town	2	(0)
2003–2004	→ Northampton Town (loan)	1	(0)
2004	Clacton Town		(0)
2005	Heybridge Swifts	8	(0)
2005–2006	AFC		
2006–2007	Aalsmeer		
2007–2008	Sudbury		
2008–2009	Fässberg		
2009	Swindon Supermarine		
2009	Torres		
Total		11	(0)

International career
1996–1997	Netherlands U15	3	(0)
1997–1998	Netherlands U16	8	(0)
2000	Netherlands U18	1	(0)
2000	Netherlands U19	4	(0)
- * Club domestic league appearances and goals

Nabil Abidallah (Arabic: نبيل عبيد الله; born 5 August 1982) is a Dutch former professional footballer.

== Club career ==
Born in Amsterdam, Abidallah's career started at Ajax in 1999, from where he moved to Ipswich Town, where he only played twice in the league both of which coming on as a substitute against Everton and Bradford City, in 2001. He stayed with Town for four years making a total of six appearances, before being given a free transfer to Northampton Town. He also played for Heybridge Swifts and Clacton Town, before returning to the Netherlands to play for amateur side Amsterdamsche in 2005. From 2006 on he played at Aalsmeer.

In 2008, he joined Swedish side Fässberg before joining Italian Torres in 2009.

== Personal life ==
In May 2006 Abidallah was arrested for burglary, after breaking into his former house which he had to leave after failing to pay his rent.
