= 1993–94 Ipswich Town F.C. season =

Ipswich Town F.C.
1993–94 season
- Chairman: John Kerr
- Manager: John Lyall
- FA Premier League: 19th
- FA Cup: Fifth round
- League Cup: Third round
- Top goalscorer: League: Ian Marshall (10); All: Ian Marshall (15)
- Highest home attendance: 22,559 (vs Manchester United, 1 May 1994, Premier League)
- Lowest home attendance: 8,654 (vs Cambridge United, 21 Sep 1993, League Cup)
- Average home league attendance: 16,382

During the 1993–94 English football season, Ipswich Town competed in the FA Premier League.

== Season summary ==
Ipswich Town looked to improve on their 16th-place finish of the previous campaign. Their initial form was promising, and in November they held Manchester United to a goalless draw at Old Trafford. But, as had happened a season earlier, their late season form took a dramatic slump and they found themselves in a relegation battle. The 5–1 home defeat to Arsenal was Ipswich's worst home defeat in 18 years.

Ipswich failed to win their last 11 games but their survival was secured on the final day of the season after fellow strugglers Sheffield United were beaten by a late goal by Chelsea and Oldham Athletic failed to beat Norwich City.

== Kit ==
Ipswich Town's kit was manufactured by English company Umbro and sponsored by Ipswich-based chemical manufacturer Fisons.

== First-team squad ==
Squad at end of season

Note: Flags indicate national team as defined under FIFA eligibility rules; some limited exceptions apply. Players may hold more than one non-FIFA nationality.

No.	Pos.	Nation	Player
1	GK	CAN	Craig Forrest
2	MF	ENG	Mick Stockwell
3	DF	ENG	Neil Thompson
4	MF	ENG	Paul Mason
5	DF	SCO	John Wark
6	DF	ENG	David Linighan
7	MF	WAL	Geraint Williams
8	MF	ENG	Gavin Johnson
9	MF	BUL	Boncho Genchev
10	FW	ENG	Ian Marshall

No.	Pos.	Nation	Player
11	FW	ENG	Chris Kiwomya
12	FW	ENG	Paul Goddard
13	GK	ENG	Clive Baker
15	DF	ENG	Phil Whelan
16	DF	ENG	Eddie Youds
17	MF	ENG	Simon Milton
18	DF	ENG	Steve Palmer (captain)
19	DF	CAN	Frank Yallop
21	MF	ENG	Stuart Slater
22	MF	ENG	Lee Durrant

=== Left club during season ===
Note: Flags indicate national team as defined under FIFA eligibility rules; some limited exceptions apply. Players may hold more than one non-FIFA nationality.

No. / Pos. / Nation / Player; 14 / FW / ENG / Steve Whitton (to Colchester United)	No. / Pos. / Nation / Player; 26 / FW / ZAM / Neil Gregory (on loan to Chesterfield)

=== Reserve squad ===
Note: Flags indicate national team as defined under FIFA eligibility rules; some limited exceptions apply. Players may hold more than one non-FIFA nationality.

No.	Pos.	Nation	Player
20	MF	ENG	David Gregory
23	GK	ENG	Phil Morgan
24	DF	ENG	Lee Honeywood
25	MF	ENG	Adam Tanner
27	DF	ENG	Leo Cotterell

No.	Pos.	Nation	Player
28	FW	ENG	Gary Thompson
29	MF	SCO	Graham Connell
30	FW	SCO	David Pirie
—	MF	ENG	Matt Weston

== Competitions ==
=== FA Premier League ===
==== League table ====
Pos	Team	Pld	W	D	L	GF	GA	GD	Pts	Qualification or relegation
17	Everton	42	12	8	22	42	63	−21	44	
18	Southampton	42	12	7	23	49	66	−17	43	
19	Ipswich Town	42	9	16	17	35	58	−23	43	
20	Sheffield United (R)	42	8	18	16	42	60	−18	42	Relegation to Football League First Division
21	Oldham Athletic (R)	42	9	13	20	42	68	−26	40	Relegation to Football League First Division

Source: Premier League
Rules for classification: 1) points; 2) goal difference; 3) number of goals scored.
(R) Relegated

==== Legend ====
Win	Draw	Loss

Ipswich Town's score comes first

==== Matches ====
Date	Opponent	Venue	Result	Attendance	Scorers
14 August 1993	Oldham Athletic	A	3–0	12,182	Marshall, Palmer, Mason
17 August 1993	Southampton	H	1–0	14,569	Marshall
21 August 1993	Chelsea	H	1–0	17,582	Marshall
25 August 1993	Norwich City	A	0–1	19,189	
28 August 1993	Sheffield United	A	1–1	17,932	Whitton
31 August 1993	Newcastle United	H	1–1	19,102	Kiwomya
11 September 1993	Arsenal	A	0–4	28,563	
18 September 1993	Aston Villa	H	1–2	16,617	Marshall
26 September 1993	Tottenham Hotspur	H	2–2	19,411	Milton, Marshall
2 October 1993	Queens Park Rangers	A	0–3	12,292	
17 October 1993	Leeds United	H	0–0	17,548	
25 October 1993	Wimbledon	A	2–0	7,756	Mason, Stockwell
30 October 1993	Everton	H	0–2	15,078	
6 November 1993	Sheffield Wednesday	H	1–4	15,070	Marshall
20 November 1993	Swindon Town	A	2–2	13,343	Wark (2)
24 November 1993	Manchester United	A	0–0	43,300	
27 November 1993	Blackburn Rovers	H	1–0	14,582	Youds
4 December 1993	Oldham Athletic	H	0–0	12,004	
8 December 1993	Southampton	A	1–0	9,028	Kiwomya
11 December 1993	Chelsea	A	1–1	12,508	Kiwomya
18 December 1993	Norwich City	H	2–1	19,498	Wark (pen), Megson (own goal)
27 December 1993	West Ham United	H	1–1	21,024	Linighan
1 January 1994	Liverpool	H	1–2	22,355	Marshall
15 January 1994	Leeds United	A	0–0	31,317	
22 January 1994	Wimbledon	H	0–0	12,372	
2 February 1994	Coventry City	A	0–1	11,265	
5 February 1994	Manchester City	A	1–2	28,188	Marshall
12 February 1994	Everton	A	0–0	19,588	
22 February 1994	Sheffield United	H	3–2	10,747	Marshall, Linighan, Slater
5 March 1994	Arsenal	H	1–5	18,656	Dixon (own goal)
12 March 1994	Aston Villa	A	1–0	23,732	Johnson
19 March 1994	Tottenham Hotspur	A	1–1	26,653	Kiwomya
23 March 1994	Newcastle United	A	0–2	32,216	
26 March 1994	Queens Park Rangers	H	1–3	15,182	Genchev
29 March 1994	Manchester City	H	2–2	13,099	Linighan, Genchev (pen)
2 April 1994	West Ham United	A	1–2	18,307	Mason
4 April 1994	Coventry City	H	0–2	12,633	
9 April 1994	Liverpool	A	0–1	30,485	
16 April 1994	Swindon Town	H	1–1	14,934	Marshall
23 April 1994	Sheffield Wednesday	A	0–5	23,457	
1 May 1994	Manchester United	H	1–2	22,559	Kiwomya
7 May 1994	Blackburn Rovers	A	0–0	20,633	

=== FA Cup ===
Round	Date	Opponent	Venue	Result	Attendance	Goalscorers
R3	8 January 1994	Swindon Town	A	1–1	12,105	Marshall
R3R	18 January 1994	Swindon Town	H	2–1	12,796	Stockwell, Marshall
R4	29 January 1994	Tottenham Hotspur	H	3–0	22,539	Marshall, Johnson, N Thompson
R5	19 February 1994	Wolverhampton Wanderers	A	1–1	28,234	Wark
R5R	2 March 1994	Wolverhampton Wanderers	H	1–2	19,385	Palmer

=== League Cup ===
Round	Date	Opponent	Venue	Result	Attendance	Goalscorers
R2 1st leg	21 September 1993	Cambridge United	H	2–1	8,654	Milton
R2 2nd leg	5 October 1993	Cambridge United	A	2–0 (won 4–1 on agg)	6,979	Marshall, Kiwomya
R3	27 October 1993	Liverpool	A	2–3	19,058	Mason (pen), Marshall

== Transfers ==
=== Transfers in ===
Date	Pos	Name	From	Fee	Ref
18 June 1993	MF	Paul Mason	Aberdeen	£400,000	
9 August 1993	FW	Ian Marshall	Oldham Athletic	£750,000	
30 September 1993	MF	Stuart Slater	Celtic	£750,000	

=== Transfers out ===
Date	Pos	Name	To	Fee	Ref
1 July 1993	GK	Jason Winters	Free agent	Released	
30 June 1993	MF	Vlado Bozinovski	Paços de Ferreira	Undisclosed	
1 August 1993	MF	Jason Dozzell	Tottenham Hotspur	£1,900,000	
24 March 1994	FW	Steve Whitton	Colchester United	£10,000	

=== Loans out ===
Date from	Pos	Name	From	Date until	Ref
3 February 1994	FW	Neil Gregory	Chesterfield	31 May 1994	

== Awards ==
=== Player awards ===
Award	Player
Player of the Year	John Wark
