= List of Ipswich Town F.C. seasons =

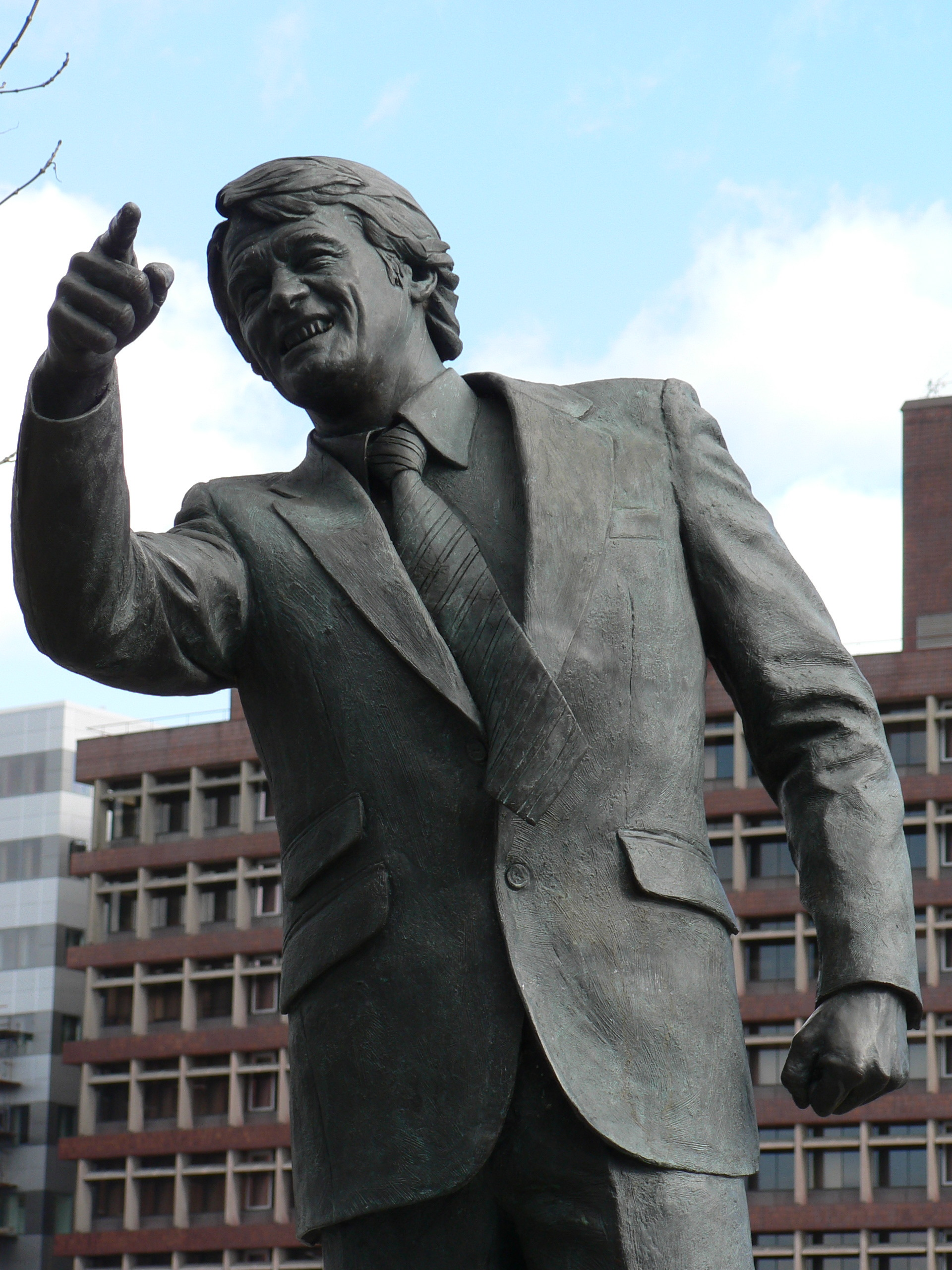
Statue of Sir Bobby Robson who managed Ipswich Town from the 1969–70 season to the 1981–82 season.

Ipswich Town Football Club have played association football since their foundation in 1878. For every season in which they have played, a set of statistics exist for their results in a number of competitions, including competitions in English and European football.

Following the club's foundation, Ipswich Town played amateur football against teams from around Suffolk. During the 1880s, the club played a number of matches in the Suffolk Challenge Cup, winning it three times. Throughout the early part of the 20th century, Ipswich played in various amateur competitions including the Norfolk & Suffolk League, the South East Anglian League, the Eastern Counties League and the Southern Amateur League. Turning professional in 1936, Ipswich joined the Southern Football League before moving into the Football League by gaining entry to Division Three (South) in the 1937–38 season.

The club has won the League Championship on a single occasion, the FA Cup once, and the UEFA Cup once.

As of the end of the 2025–26 season, the club have spent 27 seasons in the top division of English football, 39 in the second, and 15 in the third.

This list details the club's achievements in all competitive competitions, and the top scorers for each season.

== Seasons ==
Season	League record									FA Cup	EFL Cup (Note: The League Cup was founded in 1961.)	Europe / Other		Top goalscorer(s) (Note: Goals in all competitions (English Football League or Premier League, FA Cup, League Cup, EFL Trophy and European) are counted.)	
Season	Division	Pld	W	D	L	GF	GA	Pts	Pos	FA Cup	EFL Cup	Europe / Other		Player(s)	Goals
1878–79	–	10	7	0	3	25	12								
1879–80	–	8	7	0	1	39	5								
1880–81	–	12	9	3	0	48	6								
1881–82	–	9	8	1	0	48	4								
1882–83	–	5	5	0	0	25	3								
1883–84	–	4	2	1	1	17	9								
1884–85	–	10	9	1	0	46	11								
1885–86	–	19	13	3	3	47	20							HB Peacock	4
1886–87	–	15	11	2	2	44	23							HB Peacock	6
1887–88	–	14	8	0	6	42	24							S Turner	2
1888–89	–	16	12	2	2	63	21							GS Sherrington	6
1889–90	N&SL	18	14	3	1	73	16								
1890–91	N&SL	15	10	1	4	38	20			QR4				GA Kent P Turner	3
1891–92	N&SL	21	12	2	7	52	31			QR1				EA Kent S Turner	3
1892–93	N&SL	26	15	2	9	84	48			QR4				AJ Haward	5
1893–94	N&SL	29	22	0	7	123	31							AC Rock	3
1894–95	N&SL	30	19	7	4	106	41							EA Kent ER Oxborrow	9
1895–96	N&SL	28	16	2	10	84	45							EA Kent	9
1897–98	N&SL	24	15	3	6	74	37							EA Kent	5
1898–99	N&SL	27	13	3	11	60	58							HJ Henman	3
1899–1900	N&SL	29	14	6	9	68	45							HJ Henman HF Steel	7
1900–01	N&SL	28	14	2	12	70	58							EA Kent	12
1901–02	N&SL	30	18	3	29	73	58							Three players (Note: EA Kent, HF Steel and WS Murdoch scored seven goals each.)	7
1902–03	N&SL	28	14	2	12	68	53							CC Woodward	18
1903–04	EAL	34	18	4	12	85	68		1st					JW Malden	11
1904–05	EAL	38	24	3	11	102	62		2nd					HF Steel	28
1905–06	EAL	41	18	7	16	84	77							G Lewis	17
1906–07	N&SL	39	22	5	12	101	61							JW Malden	21
1907–08	SAL	38	17	7	14	89	82							JW Malden	6
1908–09	SAL	32	13	6	13	71	65							F Turner	14
1909–10	SAL	33	15	3	15	73	83							JW Malden	11
1910–11	SAL	35	19	3	13	99	77							JW Malden	9
1911–12	SAL	37	18	9	10	81	60							E Bugg	17
1911–12	SAL	37	23	1	13	105	72							E Bugg	17
1912–13	SAL	36	20	4	12	106	78							E Bugg	14
1914–15	SAL	3	2	1	0	11	4								
1915–16	Ipswich played no competitive football between 1915 and 1920 due to the First World War														
1916–17	Ipswich played no competitive football between 1915 and 1920 due to the First World War														
1917–18	Ipswich played no competitive football between 1915 and 1920 due to the First World War														
1918–19	Ipswich played no competitive football between 1915 and 1920 due to the First World War														
1919–20	Ipswich played no competitive football between 1915 and 1920 due to the First World War														
1920–21	SAL	44	19	13	12	96	72							L Mizen	15
1921–22	SAL	41	27	8	6	122	57		1st					FC Johnson	26
1922–23	SAL	44	21	8	15	95	75		2nd					RH Haste	19
1923–24	SAL	45	16	10	19	84	83							Three players (Note: A Fenn, F Tucker and L Turner scored five goals each.)	5
1924–25	SAL	44	22	4	18	98	87							WW Dempsey	22
1925–26	SAL	42	18	7	17	90	96							P Bugg	7
1926–27	SAL	44	17	9	18	115	118							WV Mathews	15
1927–28	SAL	51	27	7	17	142	107							J Green	7
1928–29	SAL	43	26	7	10	118	58							L Gibbs	16
1929–30	SAL	45	36	1	8	167	74		1st					F Birtchnell	32
1930–31	SAL	45	28	3	14	131	97		2nd	QR2				AA Green	30
1931–32	SAL	47	19	8	20	132	118			PR				AA Green	27
1932–33	SAL	42	26	7	9	98	56		1st	PR				A Rodwell	11
1933–34	SAL	48	28	3	17	125	71		1st	EPR				J Sowerby	28
1934–35	SAL	45	20	9	16	85	75			QR3				J Sowerby	13
1935–36	ECL	42	20	9	13	114	85			QR1				L Calver	21
1936–37	SL	30	19	8	3	68	35	46	1st	R2				Jock Carter	26
1937–38	SL	34	19	6	9	89	54	44	3rd	R1				Gilbert Alsop	26
1938–39	Div 3(S)	42	16	12	14	62	52	44	7th	R3		Third Division South Cup	QF	Fred Chadwick	23
1939–40	n/a (Note: The 1939–40 season was abandoned in early September and all results annulled. At the time of the abandonment, Ipswich had played three competitive matches, winning one and drawing two, and were in 10th position in Division Three (South).)														
1940–41	Ipswich played no league football between 1939 and 1946 due to the Second World War														
1941–42	Ipswich played no league football between 1939 and 1946 due to the Second World War														
1942–43	Ipswich played no league football between 1939 and 1946 due to the Second World War														
1943–44	Ipswich played no league football between 1939 and 1946 due to the Second World War														
1944–45	Ipswich played no league football between 1939 and 1946 due to the Second World War														
1945–46	n/a (Note: The FA Cup was contested in 1945–46 but the English Football League did not resume until the following season.)									R2		Third Division South Cup	GS		
1946–47	Div 3(S)	42	16	14	12	61	53	46	6th	R2				Albert Day	14
1947–48	Div 3(S)	42	23	3	16	67	61	49	4th	R1				Bill Jennings	14
1948–49	Div 3(S)	42	18	9	15	78	77	45	7th	R1				Bill Jennings	23
1949–50	Div 3(S)	42	12	11	19	57	86	35	17th (Note: Lowest Football League finish.)	R3				Stan Parker	15
1950–51	Div 3(S)	42	23	6	17	69	58	52	8th	R2				Sammy McCrory	21
1951–52	Div 3(S)	46	16	9	21	63	74	41	17th (Note: Lowest Football League finish.)	R3				Tom Garneys	20
1952–53	Div 3(S)	46	13	15	18	60	69	41	17th (Note: Lowest Football League finish.)	R3				Tom Garneys	24
1953–54	Div 3(S) ↑	42	27	10	9	82	51	64	1st	R5				Tom Garneys	24
1954–55	Div 2 ↓	42	11	6	25	57	92	28	21st	R1				Tom Garneys	21
1955–56	Div 3(S)	46	25	14	7	106	60	64	3rd	R1				Tommy Parker	31
1956–57	Div 3(S) ↑	46	25	9	12	101	54	59	1st	R1				Ted Phillips	46
1957–58	Div 2	42	16	12	14	68	69	44	8th	R4				Tom Garneys	19
1958–59	Div 2	42	17	6	19	62	77	40	16th	R5				Ray Crawford	26
1959–60	Div 2	42	19	6	17	78	68	44	11th	R3				Ted Phillips	25
1960–61	Div 2 ↑	42	26	7	9	100	55	59	1st	R3	R1			Ray Crawford	40
1961–62	Div 1	42	24	8	10	93	67	56	1st	R3	R4			Ray Crawford (Note: Ray Crawford was the joint league leading goal scorer with West Bromwich Albion's Derek Kevan for the 1961–62 season.)	37
1962–63	Div 1	42	12	11	19	59	78	35	17th	R4	— (Note: There is no record of Ipswich entering the competition in the 1962–63 season. They apparently declined, possibly due to playing in the European Cup. In the early years of the League Cup, such decisions were commonplace.)	FA Charity Shield European Cup	RU R1	Ray Crawford	33
1963–64	Div 1 ↓	42	9	7	26	56	121	25	22nd	R4	R2			Gerry Baker	18
1964–65	Div 2	42	15	17	10	74	67	47	5th	R4	R2			Gerry Baker	16
1965–66	Div 2	42	15	9	18	58	66	39	15th	R3	R5			Gerry Baker	15
1966–67	Div 2	42	17	16	9	70	54	50	5th	R5	R3			Ray Crawford	25
1967–68	Div 2 ↑	42	22	15	5	79	44	59	1st	R3	R3			Ray Crawford	21
1968–69	Div 1	42	15	11	16	59	60	41	12th	R3	R2			Ray Crawford John O'Rourke	17
1969–70	Div 1	42	10	11	21	40	63	31	18th	R3	R3			Colin Viljoen	6
1970–71	Div 1	42	12	10	20	42	48	34	19th	R5	R2			Colin Viljoen	12
1971–72	Div 1	42	11	16	15	39	53	38	13th	R4	R2			Mick Hill	8
1972–73	Div 1	42	17	14	11	55	45	46	4th	R4	R3	Texaco Cup	W	Trevor Whymark	16
1973–74	Div 1	42	18	11	13	67	58	49	4th	R5	R4	UEFA Cup	QF	Bryan Hamilton	19
1974–75	Div 1	42	23	5	14	66	44	51	3rd	SF	R5	UEFA Cup	R1	Bryan Hamilton	17
1975–76	Div 1	42	16	14	12	54	48	46	6th	R4	R2	UEFA Cup	R2	Trevor Whymark	15
1976–77	Div 1	42	22	8	12	66	39	52	3rd	R4	R2			Trevor Whymark	15
1977–78	Div 1	42	11	13	18	47	61	35	18th	W	R4	UEFA Cup	R3	Paul Mariner	22
1978–79	Div 1	42	20	9	13	63	49	49	6th	QF	R2	FA Charity Shield European Cup Winners' Cup	RU QF	Paul Mariner	17
1979–80	Div 1	42	22	9	11	68	39	53	3rd	QF	R2	UEFA Cup	R2	Paul Mariner	22
1980–81	Div 1	42	23	10	9	77	43	56	2nd	SF	R4	UEFA Cup	W	John Wark	36
1981–82	Div 1	42	26	5	11	75	53	83 (Note: The 1981–82 season saw the introduction of three points for a win.)	2nd	R5	SF	UEFA Cup	R1	Alan Brazil	28
1982–83	Div 1	42	15	13	14	64	50	58	9th	R5	R2	UEFA Cup	R1	John Wark	23
1983–84	Div 1	42	15	8	19	55	57	53	12th	R4	R4			Eric Gates	16
1984–85	Div 1	42	13	11	18	46	57	50	17th	QF	SF			Eric Gates	16
1985–86	Div 1 ↓	42	11	8	23	32	55	41	20th	R4	R4			Kevin Wilson	15
1986–87	Div 2	42	17	13	12	59	43	64	5th (Note: Lost in play-off semi-finals to Charlton Athletic.)	R3	R3	Full Members' Cup League play-offs	SF SF	Kevin Wilson	25
1987–88	Div 2	44	19	9	16	61	52	66	8th	R3	R4	Full Members' Cup	QF	David Lowe	18
1988–89	Div 2	46	22	7	17	71	61	73	8th	R3	R4	Full Members' Cup	QF	Three players (Note: Dalian Atkinson, Jason Dozzell and John Wark scored 13 goals each.)	13
1989–90	Div 2	46	19	12	15	67	66	69	9th	R4	R2	Full Members' Cup	QF	David Lowe	13
1990–91	Div 2	46	13	18	15	60	68	57	14th	R3	R3	Full Members' Cup	SF	Chris Kiwomya	12
1991–92	Div 2 ↑	46	24	12	10	70	50	84	1st	R5	R2	Full Members' Cup	R3	Chris Kiwomya	19
1992–93	Prem	42	12	16	14	50	55	52	16th	QF	R5			Chris Kiwomya	17
1993–94	Prem	42	9	16	17	35	58	43	19th	R5	R3			Ian Marshall	15
1994–95	Prem ↓	42	7	6	29	36	93	27	22nd	R3	R2			Claus Thomsen	5
1995–96	Div 1	46	19	12	15	79	69	69	7th	R5	R2	Anglo-Italian Cup	QF	Ian Marshall Alex Mathie	19
1996–97	Div 1	46	20	14	12	68	50	74	4th (Note: Lost in play-off semi-finals to Sheffield United F.C.)	R3	R5	League play-offs	SF	Paul Mason	14
1997–98	Div 1	46	23	14	9	77	43	83	5th (Note: Lost in play-off semi-finals to Charlton Athletic F.C.)	R4	R5	League play-offs	SF	David Johnson	22
1998–99	Div 1	46	26	8	12	69	32	86	3rd (Note: Lost in play-off semi-finals to Bolton Wanderers F.C.)	R4	R2	League play-offs	SF	David Johnson James Scowcroft	14
1999–2000	Div 1 ↑	46	25	12	9	71	42	87	3rd (Note: Promoted following 4–2 victory over Barnsley F.C. in the play-off final.)	R3	R2	League play-offs	W	David Johnson	23
2000–01	Prem	38	20	6	12	57	42	66	5th	R4	SF			Marcus Stewart	21
2001–02	Prem ↓	38	9	9	20	41	64	36	18th	R4	R4	UEFA Cup	R3	Marcus Bent Marcus Stewart	10
2002–03	Div 1	46	19	13	14	80	64	70	7th	R4	R4	UEFA Cup	R2 (Note: Ipswich qualified for the UEFA Cup via the UEFA Fair Play rankings.)	Pablo Couñago	21
2003–04	Div 1	46	21	10	15	84	72	73	5th (Note: Lost in play-off semi-finals to West Ham United F.C.)	R4	R2	League play-offs	SF	Darren Bent	16
2004–05	Chmp (Note: Division One is renamed The Championship.)	46	24	13	9	85	56	85	3rd (Note: Lost in the play-off semi-finals to West Ham United F.C. for the second consecutive season.)	R3	R2	League play-offs	SF	Darren Bent Shefki Kuqi	20
2005–06	Chmp	46	14	14	18	53	66	56	15th	R3	R1			Nicky Forster	7
2006–07	Chmp	46	18	8	20	64	59	62	14th	R5	R1			Alan Lee	17
2007–08	Chmp	46	18	15	13	65	56	69	8th	R3	R1			Jonathan Walters	13
2008–09	Chmp	46	17	15	14	62	53	66	9th	R4	R3			Jonathan Stead	13
2009–10	Chmp	46	12	20	14	50	61	56	15th	R4	R2			Jonathan Walters	8
2010–11	Chmp	46	18	8	20	62	68	62	13th	R3	SF			David Norris	11
2011–12	Chmp	46	17	10	19	69	77	61	15th	R3	R1			Michael Chopra	14
2012–13	Chmp	46	16	12	18	48	61	60	14th	R3	R2			DJ Campbell	10
2013–14	Chmp	46	18	14	14	60	54	68	9th	R3	R1			David McGoldrick	16
2014–15	Chmp	46	22	12	12	72	54	78	6th (Note: Lost in play-off semi-finals to Norwich City F.C.)	R3	R1	League play-offs	SF	Daryl Murphy	27
2015–16	Chmp	46	18	15	13	53	51	69	7th	R3	R3			Brett Pitman	11
2016–17	Chmp	46	13	16	17	48	58	55	16th	R3	R1			Tom Lawrence	11
2017–18	Chmp	46	17	9	20	57	60	60	12th	R3	R2			Martyn Waghorn	16
2018–19	Chmp ↓	46	5	16	25	36	77	31	24th	R3	R1			Gwion Edwards Freddie Sears	6
2019–20	Lg 1	36	14	10	12	46	36	52	11th (Note: The 2019–20 season was prematurely curtailed as a result of the COVID-19 pandemic. League standings were determined by a points-per-game method.)	R2	R1	EFL Trophy	R3	Kayden Jackson James Norwood	11
2020–21	Lg 1	46	19	12	15	46	46	69	9th	R1	R2	EFL Trophy	Gp	James Norwood	10
2021–22	Lg 1	46	18	16	12	67	46	70	11th	R2	R1	EFL Trophy	R2	Wes Burns	13
2022–23	Lg 1 ↑	46	28	14	4	101	35	98	2nd	R4	R1	EFL Trophy	R2	Conor Chaplin	29
2023–24	Chmp ↑	46	28	12	6	92	57	96	2nd	R4	R4			Nathan Broadhead Conor Chaplin	13
2024–25	Prem ↓	38	4	10	24	36	82	22	19th	R5	R2			Liam Delap	12
2025–26	Chmp ↑	46	23	15	8	80	47	84	2nd	R4	R1			Jack Clark	16

== Key ==
Ipswich Town league performance from 1938 to 2024

- Pld = Matches played
- W = Matches won
- D = Matches drawn
- L = Matches lost
- GF = Goals for
- GA = Goals against
- Pts = Points
- Pos = Final position
- N&SL = Norfolk & Suffolk League
- EAL = East Anglian League
- SAL = Southern Amateur League
- ECL = Eastern Counties Football League
- SL = Southern League
- Div 1 = Football League First Division
- Div 2 = Football League Second Division
- Div 3(S) = Football League Third Division South
- Prem = Premier League
- Chmp = Championship
- Lg 1 = League One
- n/a = Not applicable
- QR1 = Qualifying round 1
- QR2 = Qualifying round 2
- QR3 = Qualifying round 3
- QR4 = Qualifying round 4
- R1 = Round 1
- R2 = Round 2
- R3 = Round 3
- R4 = Round 4
- R5 = Round 5
- QF = Quarter-finals
- SF = Semi-finals

Champions	Runners-up	Promoted	Relegated

Top scorers shown in bold are players who were also top scorers in their division that season.
