= 1996–97 Ipswich Town F.C. season =

Ipswich Town
1996–97 season
- Chairman: David Sheepshanks
- Manager: George Burley
- Stadium: Portman Road
- First Division: 4th
- FA Cup: Third round
- League Cup: Fifth round
- Play-offs: Semi-finals
- Top goalscorer: League: Paul Mason (12); All: Paul Mason (15)
- Highest home attendance: 22,397 (vs. Norwich City, 18 April 1997, First Division)
- Lowest home attendance: 6,163 (vs. Bournemouth, 20 August 1996, League Cup)
- Average home league attendance: 11,953

During the 1996–97 English football season, Ipswich Town competed in the Football League First Division.

== Season summary ==
In George Burley's second season in charge of Ipswich, the club reached the play-offs as they looked for a return to the Premier League at the second attempt. Ipswich were in the bottom half of the table for most of the first half of the season but their form in the new year saw Town go 10 games unbeaten and move into the play-off places. Jason Cundy was signed on loan in October to bolster the team and became permanent a month later but was diagnosed with testicular cancer in February and stopped playing. In January, Adam Tanner failed a drug test and was withdrawn from the squad and later suspended for three months.

In the play-offs, Ipswich faced Sheffield United in the semi-final. The first leg played at Bramall Lane finished 1–1. In the return leg, Niklas Gudmundsson gave Ipswich a 2–1 lead in the 73rd minute but their advantage lasted just four minutes until Andy Walker made it 2–2. With the aggregate scores level at 3–3, the game went into extra time but no further goals were scored, and Sheffield United advanced to the final as they had scored more away goals than Ipswich.

Ipswich also reached the quarter-finals of the Coca-Cola Cup, losing to Leicester City.

== First-team squad ==
Note: Flags indicate national team as defined under FIFA eligibility rules; some limited exceptions apply. Players may hold more than one non-FIFA nationality.

| No. | Pos. | Nation | Player |
|---|---|---|---|
| — | GK | (England) ENG | Richard Wright |
| — | GK | (Canada) CAN | Craig Forrest |
| — | DF | (England) ENG | Wayne Brown |
| — | DF | (England) ENG | Jason Cundy |
| — | DF | (England) ENG | Tony Mowbray |
| — | DF | (England) ENG | Chris Swailes |
| — | DF | (England) ENG | Tony Vaughan |
| — | DF | (Netherlands) NED | Gus Uhlenbeek |
| — | DF | (Argentina) ARG | Mauricio Taricco |
| — | MF | (England) ENG | Steve Sedgley |
| — | MF | (England) ENG | Kieron Dyer |
| — | MF | (England) ENG | Paul Mason |
| — | MF | (England) ENG | Simon Milton |
| — | MF | (England) ENG | Mick Stockwell |

| No. | Pos. | Nation | Player |
|---|---|---|---|
| — | MF | (England) ENG | Adam Tanner |
| — | MF | (Wales) WAL | Geraint Williams |
| — | MF | (Scotland) SCO | John Wark |
| — | MF | (Northern Ireland) NIR | Danny Sonner |
| — | MF | (Netherlands) NED | Bobby Petta |
| — | MF | (New Zealand) NZL | Lee Norfolk |
| — | MF | (Scotland) SCO | Stuart Niven |
| — | MF | (Sweden) SWE | Niklas Gudmundsson (on loan from Blackburn Rovers) |
| — | FW | (England) ENG | Richard Naylor |
| — | FW | (England) ENG | James Scowcroft |
| — | FW | (Scotland) SCO | Gerry Creaney (on loan from Manchester City) |
| — | FW | (Scotland) SCO | Alex Mathie |
| — | FW | (Zambia) ZAM | Neil Gregory |

=== Left club during season ===
Note: Flags indicate national team as defined under FIFA eligibility rules; some limited exceptions apply. Players may hold more than one non-FIFA nationality.

| No. | Pos. | Nation | Player |
|---|---|---|---|
| — | GK | (Northern Ireland) NIR | Aidan Davison (loan return to Bolton Wanderers) |
| — | DF | (Denmark) DEN | Claus Thomsen (to Everton) |
| — | MF | (England) ENG | Bobby Howe (loan return to Nottingham Forest) |

| No. | Pos. | Nation | Player |
|---|---|---|---|
| — | FW | (Saint Lucia) LCA | Earl Jean (to Rotherham United) |
| — | FW | (England) ENG | Ian Marshall (to Leicester City) |

== Competitions ==
=== Football League First Division ===
==== League table ====
| Pos | Team | Pld | W | D | L | GF | GA | GD | Pts | Qualification or relegation |
|---|---|---|---|---|---|---|---|---|---|---|
| 2 | Barnsley (P) | 46 | 22 | 14 | 10 | 76 | 55 | +21 | 80 | Promotion to the Premier League |
| 3 | Wolverhampton Wanderers | 46 | 22 | 10 | 14 | 68 | 51 | +17 | 76 | Qualification for the First Division play-offs |
| 4 | Ipswich Town | 46 | 20 | 14 | 12 | 68 | 50 | +18 | 74 | Qualification for the First Division play-offs |
| 5 | Sheffield United | 46 | 20 | 13 | 13 | 75 | 52 | +23 | 73 | Qualification for the First Division play-offs |
| 6 | Crystal Palace (O, P) | 46 | 19 | 14 | 13 | 78 | 48 | +30 | 71 | Qualification for the First Division play-offs |

Rules for classification: 1) Points; 2) Goals scored; 3) Goal difference
(O) Play-off winners; (P) Promoted

==== Legend ====
| Win | Draw | Loss |

Ipswich Town's score comes first

==== Matches ====
| Date | Opponent | Venue | Result | Attendance | Scorers |
|---|---|---|---|---|---|
| 16 August 1996 | Manchester City | A | 0–1 | 29,126 | |
| 24 August 1996 | Reading | H | 5–2 | 9,767 | Vaughan (2), Sedgley (pen), Taricco, Scowcroft |
| 27 August 1996 | Grimsby Town | H | 1–1 | 9,762 | Mason |
| 31 August 1996 | Oldham Athletic | A | 3–3 | 5,339 | Mathie (2), Stockwell |
| 7 September 1996 | Huddersfield Town | H | 1–3 | 10,661 | Mason |
| 10 September 1996 | Crystal Palace | A | 0–0 | 12,520 | |
| 14 September 1996 | Sheffield United | A | 3–1 | 14,261 | Sedgley, Scowcroft (2) |
| 20 September 1996 | Charlton Athletic | H | 2–1 | 10,558 | Sedgley, Mathie |
| 28 September 1996 | West Bromwich Albion | A | 0–0 | 15,606 | |
| 1 October 1996 | Barnsley | H | 1–1 | 9,041 | Mathie |
| 11 October 1996 | Norwich City | A | 1–3 | 20,256 | Sonner |
| 15 October 1996 | Birmingham City | A | 0–1 | 15,664 | |
| 19 October 1996 | Portsmouth | H | 1–1 | 10,514 | Mason |
| 26 October 1996 | Tranmere Rovers | H | 0–2 | 11,003 | |
| 30 October 1996 | Queens Park Rangers | A | 1–0 | 10,562 | Mason |
| 2 November 1996 | Oxford United | A | 1–3 | 7,903 | Tanner |
| 9 November 1996 | Southend United | H | 1–1 | 10,146 | Stockwell |
| 16 November 1996 | Bradford City | A | 1–2 | 10,504 | Cundy |
| 19 November 1996 | Swindon Town | H | 3–2 | 7,086 | Scowcroft, Creaney, Sedgley (pen) |
| 23 November 1996 | Port Vale | H | 2–1 | 9,491 | Tanner, Mason |
| 30 November 1996 | Tranmere Rovers | A | 0–3 | 10,127 | |
| 7 December 1996 | Wolverhampton Wanderers | H | 0–0 | 12,048 | |
| 14 December 1996 | Bolton Wanderers | A | 2–1 | 13,314 | Scowcroft (2) |
| 21 December 1996 | Stoke City | H | 1–1 | 10,159 | Mason |
| 26 December 1996 | Crystal Palace | H | 3–1 | 16,020 | Tanner (pen), Mason, Naylor |
| 28 December 1996 | Huddersfield Town | A | 0–2 | 11,467 | |
| 1 January 1997 | Charlton Athletic | A | 1–1 | 10,186 | Tanner (pen) |
| 18 January 1997 | Barnsley | A | 2–1 | 9,872 | Mason, Cundy |
| 25 January 1997 | West Bromwich Albion | H | 5–0 | 9,381 | Holmes (own goal), Scowcroft, Stockwell, Naylor, Mason |
| 1 February 1997 | Southend United | A | 0–0 | 7,232 | |
| 8 February 1997 | Queens Park Rangers | H | 2–0 | 12,983 | Naylor, Gregory |
| 15 February 1997 | Port Vale | A | 2–2 | 6,115 | Mason, Stockwell |
| 22 February 1997 | Oxford United | H | 2–1 | 11,483 | Naylor, Stockwell |
| 1 March 1997 | Wolverhampton Wanderers | A | 0–0 | 26,700 | |
| 4 March 1997 | Bradford City | H | 3–2 | 9,367 | Sedgley (pen), Sonner, Gregory |
| 8 March 1997 | Stoke City | A | 1–0 | 11,933 | Taricco |
| 15 March 1997 | Bolton Wanderers | H | 0–1 | 16,187 | |
| 18 March 1997 | Sheffield United | H | 3–1 | 10,374 | Gregory (3) |
| 22 March 1997 | Reading | A | 0–1 | 10,058 | |
| 31 March 1997 | Grimsby Town | A | 1–2 | 6,268 | Mason |
| 5 April 1997 | Oldham Athletic | H | 4–0 | 11,730 | Scowcroft, Williams, Stockwell, Gregory |
| 12 April 1997 | Swindon Town | A | 4–0 | 8,591 | Swailes, Stockwell, Sedgley (pen), Gudmundsson |
| 18 April 1997 | Norwich City | H | 2–0 | 22,397 | Taricco, Mason |
| 22 April 1997 | Manchester City | H | 1–0 | 15,824 | Sedgley (pen) |
| 25 April 1997 | Portsmouth | A | 1–0 | 12,101 | Scowcroft |
| 4 May 1997 | Birmingham City | H | 1–1 | 20,570 | Gudmundsson |

=== First Division play-offs ===
| Round | Date | Opponent | Venue | Result | Attendance | Goalscorers |
|---|---|---|---|---|---|---|
| SF First Leg | 10 May 1997 | Sheffield United | A | 1–1 | 22,312 | Stockwell |
| SF Second Leg | 14 May 1997 | Sheffield United | H | 2–2 (lost on away goals) | 21,467 | Scowcroft, Gudmundsson |

=== FA Cup ===
| Round | Date | Opponent | Venue | Result | Attendance | Goalscorers |
|---|---|---|---|---|---|---|
| R3 | 4 January 1997 | Nottingham Forest | A | 0–3 | 14,681 | |

=== League Cup ===
| Round | Date | Opponent | Venue | Result | Attendance | Goalscorers |
|---|---|---|---|---|---|---|
| R1 First Leg | 20 August 1996 | Bournemouth | H | 2–1 | 6,163 | Marshall, Mason |
| R1 Second Leg | 3 September 1996 | Bournemouth | A | 3–0 (won 5–1 on agg) | 4,119 | Scowcroft, Mathie, Stockwell |
| R2 First Leg | 17 September 1996 | Fulham | A | 1–1 | 6,947 | Milton |
| R2 Second Leg | 24 September 1996 | Fulham | H | 4–2 (won 5–3 on agg) | 6,825 | Sonner, Sedgley (pen), Mathie (2) |
| R3 | 22 October 1996 | Crystal Palace | H | 4–1 | 8,390 | Mason (2), Mathie (2) |
| R4 | 26 November 1996 | Gillingham | H | 1–0 | 13,537 | Naylor |
| R5 | 21 January 1997 | Leicester City | H | 0–1 | 20,793 | |

== Transfers ==
=== Transfers in ===
| Date | Pos | Name | From | Fee | Ref |
|---|---|---|---|---|---|
| 12 June 1996 | MF | (Northern Ireland) Danny Sonner | (Germany) Viktoria Köln | Free transfer | |
| 1 July 1996 | MF | (Netherlands) Bobby Petta | (Netherlands) Feyenoord | Free transfer | |
| 25 November 1996 | DF | (England) Jason Cundy | (England) Tottenham Hotspur | £200,000 | |
| 6 December 1996 | FW | (Saint Lucia) Earl Jean | (Portugal) Felgueiras | Free transfer | |

=== Loans in ===
| Date from | Pos | Name | From | Date until | Ref |
|---|---|---|---|---|---|
| 9 October 1996 | GK | (Northern Ireland) Aidan Davison | (England) Bolton Wanderers | 9 November 1996 | |
| 25 October 1996 | FW | (Scotland) Gerry Creaney | (England) Manchester City | 30 June 1997 | |
| 29 October 1996 | DF | (England) Jason Cundy | (England) Tottenham Hotspur | 24 November 1996 | |
| 17 January 1997 | MF | (England) Bobby Howe | (England) Nottingham Forrest | 8 February 1997 | |
| 20 March 1997 | MF | (Sweden) Niklas Gudmundsson | (England) Blackburn Rovers | 30 June 1997 | |

=== Transfers out ===
| Date | Pos | Name | To | Fee | Ref |
|---|---|---|---|---|---|
| 31 May 1996 | GK | (England) Clive Baker | Retired | | |
| 19 June 1996 | DF | (England) Leo Cotterell | (England) Bournemouth | Free transfer | |
| 1 July 1996 | MF | (England) Lee Durrant | (England) Harwich & Parkeston | Free transfer | |
| 1 August 1996 | DF | (England) Neil Thompson | (England) Barnsley | Free transfer | |
| 16 August 1996 | MF | (England) Richard Appleby | (Wales) Swansea City | Free transfer | |
| 31 August 1996 | FW | (England) Ian Marshall | (England) Leicester City | £800,000 | |
| 9 September 1996 | MF | (England) Stuart Slater | Free agent | Released | |
| 16 January 1997 | DF | (Denmark) Claus Thomsen | (England) Everton | £900,000 | |
| 23 January 1997 | FW | (Saint Lucia) Earl Jean | (England) Rotherham United | Free transfer | |

=== Loans out ===
| Date from | Pos | Name | From | Date until | Ref |
|---|---|---|---|---|---|
| 22 November 1996 | FW | (Zambia) Neil Gregory | (England) Torquay United | 21 December 1996 | |
| 27 March 1997 | GK | (Canada) Craig Forrest | (England) Chelsea | 22 April 1997 | |

== Awards ==
=== Player awards ===
| Award | Player |
|---|---|
| Player of the Year | (Argentina) Mauricio Taricco |
