= 1991–92 Ipswich Town F.C. season =

Ipswich Town
1991–92 season
- Chairman: John Kerr
- Manager: John Lyall
- Stadium: Portman Road
- Second Division: 1st
- FA Cup: Fifth round
- League Cup: Second round
- Full Members Cup: Third round
- Top goalscorer: League: Chris Kiwomya (16); All: Chris Kiwomya (19)
- Highest home attendance: 26,803 (vs Brighton & Hove Albion, 2 May 1992, Second Division)
- Lowest home attendance: 5,750 (vs Luton Town, 22 October 1991, League Cup)
- Average home league attendance: 14,334

The 1991–92 season for Ipswich Town saw the team compete in the final season of the former Second Division, before it was renamed the First Division the following season. Ipswich Town won the league to become one of the forming teams for the new Premier League that was contested from the 1992–93 season onwards.

== Season summary ==
John Lyall began his second season as Ipswich manager by watching his team draw 3–3 at Bristol Rovers on the opening day of the Second Division campaign. Three successive wins followed, ensuring that Ipswich finished August as leaders of the Second Division.

However, an eight-match winless run left Ipswich's promotion hopes fading by the middle of November. A 2–1 win at Wolves ended the long wait for victory, and Ipswich Town back in the heat of the race for automatic promotion to the new FA Premier League. They were up against big-spending clubs Blackburn Rovers and Derby County in the race for promotion, but also found themselves with some surprise rivals in the race in the shape of their distant local rivals Cambridge United and Southend United.

By the end of April, Ipswich had sealed promotion to the new Premier League and clinched the Second Division title, ending their six-year absence from the top flight. The season ended with a 3–1 home win over doomed Brighton.

== First-team squad ==
Squad at end of season

Note: Flags indicate national team as defined under FIFA eligibility rules; some limited exceptions apply. Players may hold more than one non-FIFA nationality.

Pos.	Nation	Player
GK	CAN	Craig Forrest
GK	ENG	Phil Morgan
DF	ENG	David Linighan
DF	ENG	Steve Palmer
DF	ENG	Glenn Pennyfather
DF	ENG	Neil Thompson
DF	SCO	John Wark
DF	ENG	Phil Whelan
DF	CAN	Frank Yallop
DF	ENG	Eddie Youds

Pos.	Nation	Player
MF	ENG	Jason Dozzell
MF	ENG	David Gregory
MF	ENG	Gavin Johnson
MF	ENG	Simon Milton
MF	ENG	Mick Stockwell
MF	NED	Romeo Zondervan (captain)
FW	ENG	Paul Goddard
FW	ENG	Chris Kiwomya
FW	ENG	Steve Whitton

=== Left club during season ===
Note: Flags indicate national team as defined under FIFA eligibility rules; some limited exceptions apply. Players may hold more than one non-FIFA nationality.

Pos.	Nation	Player
DF	ENG	Tony Humes (to Wrexham)
MF	ENG	John Moncur (loan return to Tottenham Hotspur)

Pos.	Nation	Player
FW	ENG	David Lowe (on loan to Port Vale)

=== Reserve squad ===
Note: Flags indicate national team as defined under FIFA eligibility rules; some limited exceptions apply. Players may hold more than one non-FIFA nationality.

Pos. / Nation / Player; MF / ENG / Matt Weston	Pos. / Nation / Player; FW / ZAM / Neil Gregory

== Pre-season ==
During their pre-season travels, Ipswich travelled to Finland to face Rips Riihimaki, Kemin Palloseura and Kontulan Uheilsat where Ipswich were defeated in their opening two matches but managed to win their last. Ipswich returned to England to face Lincoln City, Peterborough United and Scunthorpe United which saw the Tractor Boys draw against Lincoln and Peterborough but were defeated when up against Scunthorpe.

=== Friendlies ===
==== Legend ====
Win	Draw	Loss

Date	Opponent	Venue	Result	Attendance	Scorers
24 July 1991	Rips Rihhimaki	A	0–1	Unknown	
25 July 1991	Kemin Palloseura	A	1–2	Unknown	Unknown
27 July 1991	Kontulan Uheilsat	A	3–0	Unknown	Unknown (3)
31 July 1991	Lincoln City	A	1–1	Unknown	Unknown
2 August 1991	Peterborough United	A	3–3	Unknown	Unknown (3)
6 August 1991	Scunthorpe United	A	0–3	1,700	

== Competitions ==
=== Football League Second Division ===
==== League table ====
Pos	Team	Pld	W	D	L	GF	GA	GD	Pts	Qualification or relegation
1	Ipswich Town (C, P)	46	24	12	10	70	50	+20	84	Promotion to the FA Premier League
2	Middlesbrough (P)	46	23	11	12	58	41	+17	80	Promotion to the FA Premier League
3	Derby County	46	23	9	14	69	51	+18	78	Qualification for the Second Division play-offs
4	Leicester City	46	23	8	15	62	55	+7	77	Qualification for the Second Division play-offs
5	Cambridge United	46	19	17	10	65	47	+18	74	Qualification for the Second Division play-offs

Rules for classification: 1) Points; 2) Goal difference; 3) Goals scored
(C) Champions; (P) Promoted

==== Legend ====
Win	Draw	Loss

Ipswich Town's score comes first

==== Matches ====
Date	Opponent	Venue	Result	Attendance	Scorers
17 August 1991	Bristol Rovers	A	3–3	6,444	Dozzell, Goddard, Stockwell
20 August 1991	Port Vale	H	2–1	8,937	Kiwomya, Thompson
24 August 1991	Middlesbrough	H	2–1	9,822	Dozzell, Goddard
31 August 1991	Blackburn Rovers	A	2–1	8,898	Kiwomya, Goddard
3 September 1991	Swindon Town	H	1–4	11,002	Kiwomya
7 September 1991	Southend United	H	1–0	12,732	Thompson
14 September 1991	Barnsley	A	0–1	6,786	
17 September 1991	Newcastle United	A	1–1	16,336	Kiwomya
21 September 1991	Bristol City	H	4–2	9,692	Thompson, Lininghan, Kiwomya, Goddard
28 September 1991	Grimsby Town	A	2–1	6,621	Lowe, Johnson
5 October 1991	Oxford United	H	2–1	9,922	Milton, Whitton
12 October 1991	Brighton & Hove Albion	A	2–2	9,010	Milton, Dozzell
19 October 1991	Millwall	H	0–0	11,175	
26 October 1991	Portsmouth	A	1–1	8,007	Milton
30 October 1991	Charlton Athletic	A	1–1	6,939	Whitton
2 November 1991	Leicester City	A	2–2	11,331	Wark, Johnson
5 November 1991	Sunderland	H	0–1	9,768	
9 November 1991	Cambridge United	H	1–2	20,586	Stockwell
16 November 1991	Derby County	A	0–1	12,495	
23 November 1991	Wolverhampton Wanderers	A	2–1	11,915	Linighan, Dozzell
30 November 1991	Tranmere Rovers	H	4–0	11,072	Thompson, Wark, Milton, Linighan
7 December 1991	Plymouth Argyle	A	0–1	4,986	
20 December 1991	Swindon Town	A	0–0	7,404	
26 December 1991	Charlton Athletic	H	2–0	13,826	Kiwomya (2)
28 December 1991	Blackburn Rovers	H	2–1	17,675	Dozzell, Johnson
1 January 1992	Port Vale	A	2–1	8,075	Kiwomya (2)
11 January 1992	Middlesbrough	A	0–1	15,104	
18 January 1992	Bristol Rovers	H	1–0	10,435	Milton
1 February 1992	Millwall	A	3–2	8,847	Dozzell, Thompson, Kiwomya
8 February 1992	Portsmouth	H	5–2	13,494	Awford (o.g.), Kiwomya (2), Dozzell
21 February 1992	Tranmere Rovers	A	1–0	9,161	Milton
29 February 1992	Plymouth Argyle	H	2–0	12,852	Kiwomya, Whitton
7 March 1992	Watford	A	1–0	9,199	Whitton
14 March 1992	Leicester City	H	0–0	16,194	
17 March 1992	Watford	H	1–2	12,484	Dozzell
21 March 1992	Cambridge United	A	1–1	9,166	Milton
28 March 1992	Derby County	H	2–1	15,305	Dozzell (2)
31 March 1992	Barnsley	H	2–0	14,148	Kiwomya (2)
4 April 1992	Southend United	A	2–1	10,003	Whelan, Thompson
7 April 1992	Wolverhampton Wanderers	H	2–1	17,379	Whelan, Whitton
11 April 1992	Newcastle United	H	3–2	20,000	Kiwomya, Wark, Whitton
14 April 1992	Sunderland	A	0–3	22,131	
18 April 1992	Bristol City	A	1–2	16,941	Whitton
21 April 1992	Grimsby Town	H	0–0	22,393	
25 April 1992	Oxford United	A	1–1	10,525	Johnson
2 May 1992	Brighton & Hove Albion	H	3–1	26,803	Whitton (2), Johnson

=== FA Cup ===
Round	Date	Opponent	Venue	Result	Attendance	Scorers	Reference
R3	4 January 1992	Hartlepool United	H	1–1	12,507	Dozzell	
R3R	15 January 1992	Hartlepool United	A	2–0	6,700	Dozzell, Milton	
R4	5 February 1992	Bournemouth	H	3–0	17,193	Dozzell, Whitton, Kiwomya	
R5	16 February 1992	Liverpool	H	0–0	26,140		
R5R	26 February 1992	Liverpool	A	2–3	27,355	Johnson, Dozzell	

=== League Cup ===
Round	Date	Opponent	Venue	Result	Attendance	Scorers
R2 1st Leg	25 September 1991	Derby County	H	0–0	10,215	
R2 2nd Leg	8 October 1991	Derby County	A	0–2	8,982	

=== Full Members Cup ===
Round	Date	Opponent	Venue	Result	Attendance	Scorers
R1	2 October 1991	Bristol Rovers	A	3–1	1,490	Dozzell, Lowe (2)
R2	22 October 1991	Luton Town	H	1–1 (won 2–1 on Penalties)	5,750	Lowe
R3	26 November 1991	Chelsea	A	2–2 (lost 3–4 on Penalties)	6,325	Kiwomya (2)

== Transfers ==
=== Transfers in ===
Date	Pos	Name	From	Fee	Ref
1 July 1991	FW	(England) Paul Goddard	(England) Millwall	Free transfer	
21 September 1991	MF	(Scotland) John Wark	(England) Middlesbrough	Free transfer	
15 November 1991	DF	(England) Eddie Youds	(England) Everton	£250,000	

=== Loans in ===
Date from	Pos	Name	From	Date until	Ref
24 October 1991	MF	(England) John Moncur	(England) Tottenham Hotspur	1 January 1992	

=== Transfers out ===
Date	Pos	Name	To	Fee	Ref
1 July 1991	MF	(Scotland) Ian Redford	(Scotland) St Johnstone	Free transfer	
17 September 1991	DF	(England) Brian Gayle	(England) Sheffield United	£750,000	
27 March 1992	DF	(England) Tony Humes	(Wales) Wrexham	£40,000	

=== Loans out ===
Date from	Pos	Name	From	Date until	Ref
19 March 1992	MF	(England) David Lowe	(England) Port Vale	30 May 1992	

== Awards ==
=== Player awards ===
Award	Player
Player of the Year	(Scotland) John Wark

=== PFA First Division Team of the Year ===
Player	Ref
(England) David Linighan	
