= Dozzell =

Dozzell is a surname. Notable people with the surname include:

- Andre Dozzell (born 1999), English footballer
- Jason Dozzell (born 1967), English footballer
