= Simon Milton =

Simon Milton may refer to:

- Simon Milton (politician) (1961–2011), British politician
- Simon Milton (footballer) (born 1963), English footballer
