= Ipswich Town F.C. Player of the Year =

Local football award

Ipswich Town Player of the Year
- Sport: Association football

History
- First award: 1973
- Editions: 53 (as of 2026)
- First winner: (England) Kevin Beattie
- Most wins: (Scotland) John Wark (4 times)
- Most recent: (Netherlands) Azor Matusiwa

The Ipswich Town Player of the Year award is voted for annually by Ipswich Town's supporters in recognition of the best overall performance by an individual player throughout the football season. Towards the end of each season, fans are invited to cast their votes for this award either on-line or with one of the volunteers outside the stadium prior to a home game. The winner is the player who polls the most votes. The recipient is awarded a rosebowl trophy, presented at an awards ceremony immediately after one of the last home games of the season.

The inaugural award was made to Kevin Beattie in 1973 and he retained it the following season. Since then, four other players have won the award on more than one occasion: Terry Butcher and Matt Holland have received the honour twice, goalkeeper Bartosz Białkowski has won it three times, while John Wark has been presented with the award a record four times. Only one winner has gone on to manage the club full-time, George Burley, who won in 1977, although John Wark did act as joint caretaker-manager of the club with Paul Goddard for three matches in 1994.

== Winners ==
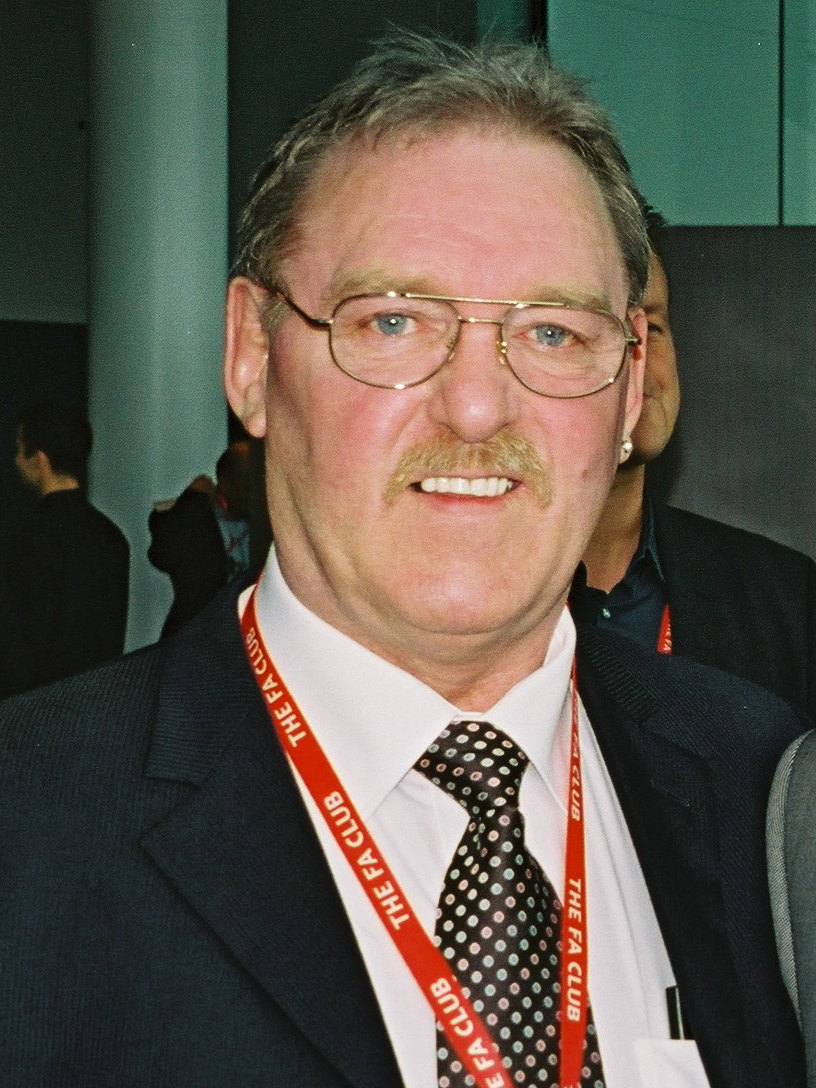
Kevin Beattie was the inaugural winner of the award.

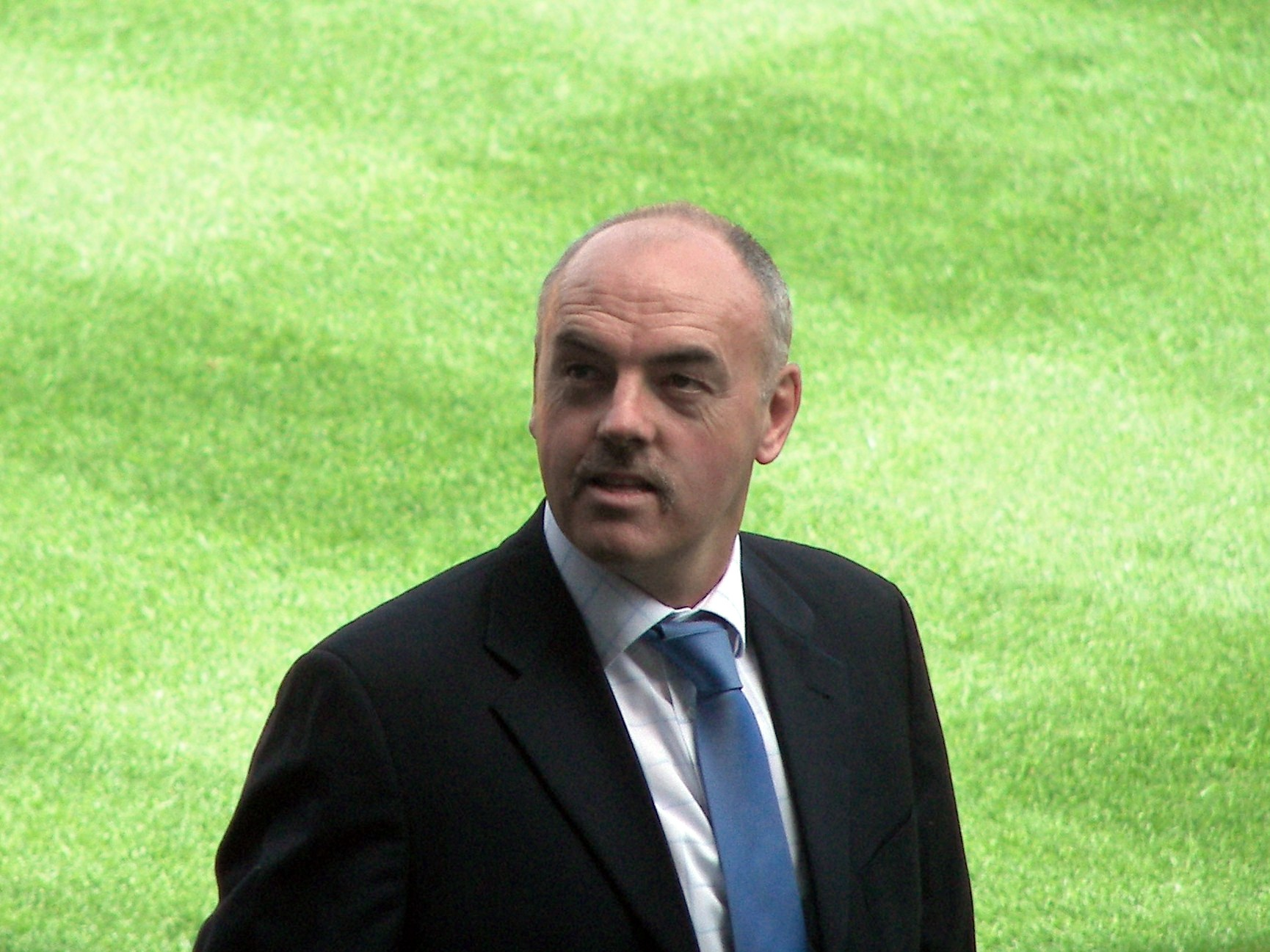
John Wark has won the award four times, the most of any Ipswich Town player.

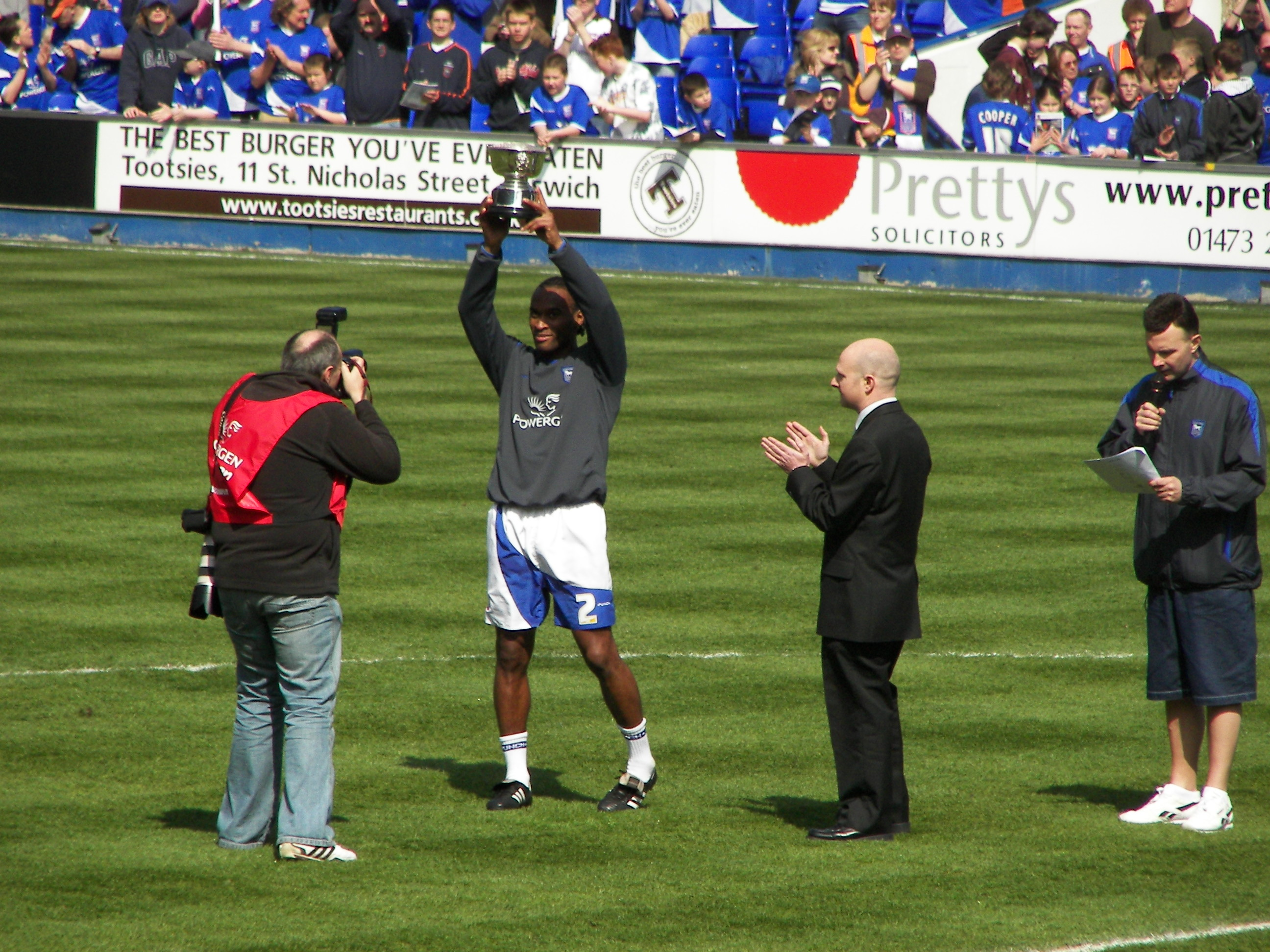
Fabian Wilnis, winner for the 2005–06 season, with the trophy.

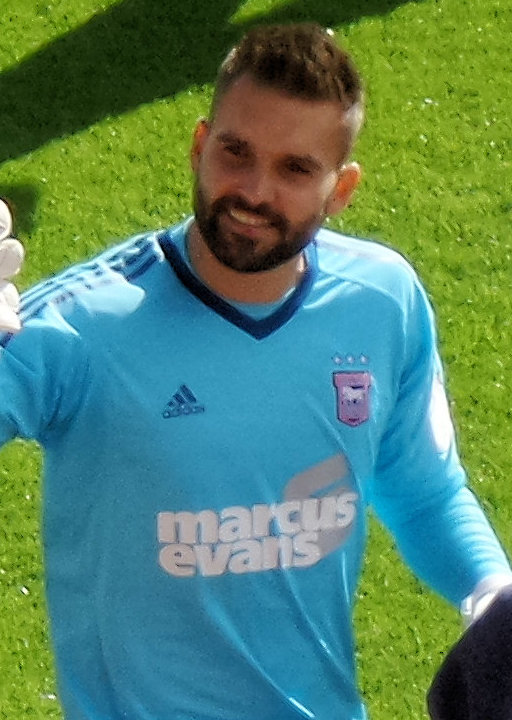
Bartosz Białkowski won the award in three consecutive seasons from 2016 to 2018.

*	Ipswich Town Hall of Fame Inductee
‡	Player still on the playing staff of the club

Recipients of the Ipswich Town F.C. Player of the Year
Season	Level (Note: The official "Level" of competition in the structure of the English league system.)	Name	Position (Note: For a full description of positions see Football Positions.)	Nationality	International caps (Note: If blank, uncapped at full international level.)	Notes
1973	1	Kevin Beattie*	Defender	England	9	(Note: Beattie was the inaugural winner of the award.)
1974	1	Kevin Beattie*	Defender	England	9	(Note: Second award.)
1975	1	Colin Viljoen	Midfielder	England	2	(Note: Viljoen was born in South Africa.)
1976	1	Allan Hunter*	Defender	Northern Ireland	53	(Note: Hunter was the first non-English winner.)
1977	1	George Burley*	Defender	Scotland	11	
1978	1	Mick Mills*	Defender	England	42	
1979	1	Arnold Mühren*	Midfielder	Netherlands	23	(Note: Mühren became the first winner from outside the United Kingdom.)
1980	1	Frans Thijssen*	Midfielder	Netherlands	14	
1981	1	Paul Cooper*	Goalkeeper	England	—	
1982	1	Alan Brazil*	Striker	Scotland	13	
1983	1	Paul Mariner*	Striker	England	35	
1984	1	Trevor Putney	Midfielder	England	—	
1985	1	Terry Butcher*	Defender	England	77	
1986	1	Terry Butcher*	Defender	England	77	
1987	2	Romeo Zondervan	Midfielder	Netherlands	1	(Note: Zondervan was born in Suriname.)
1988	2	Frank Yallop*	Defender	Canada	52	(Note: Yallop was born in England.)
1989	2	John Wark*	Midfielder	Scotland	29	
1990	2	John Wark*	Midfielder	Scotland	29	
1991	2	David Linighan*	Defender	England	—	
1992	2	John Wark*	Midfielder	Scotland	29	(Note: Third award.)
1993	1	Mick Stockwell*	Midfielder	England	—	
1994	1	John Wark*	Midfielder	Scotland	29	(Note: Fourth award.)
1995	1	Craig Forrest	Goalkeeper	Canada	56	
1996	2	Simon Milton*	Midfielder	England	—	
1997	2	Mauricio Taricco	Defender	Argentina	—	(Note: Taricco was the first non-European winner.)
1998	2	Matt Holland*	Midfielder	Republic of Ireland	49	
1999	2	Jamie Clapham	Defender	England	—	
2000	2	James Scowcroft*	Striker	England	—	
2001	1	Marcus Stewart*	Striker	England	—	
2002	1	Mark Venus*	Defender	England	—	
2003	2	Matt Holland*	Midfielder	Republic of Ireland	49	
2004	2	Ian Westlake	Midfielder	England	—	
2005	2	Shefki Kuqi	Striker	Finland	62	
2006	2	Fabian Wilnis*	Defender	Netherlands	—	
2007	2	Sylvain Legwinski	Midfielder	France	—	
2008	2	Jonathan Walters	Striker	Republic of Ireland	54	
2009	2	Richard Wright	Goalkeeper	England	2	
2010	2	Gareth McAuley	Defender	Northern Ireland	80	
2011	2	Jimmy Bullard	Midfielder	England	—	
2012	2	Aaron Cresswell	Defender	England	3	
2013	2	Tommy Smith	Defender	New Zealand	56	
2014	2	Christophe Berra	Defender	Scotland	41	
2015	2	Daryl Murphy	Striker	Republic of Ireland	32	
2016	2	Bartosz Białkowski	Goalkeeper	Poland	1	
2017	2	Bartosz Białkowski	Goalkeeper	Poland	1	
2018	2	Bartosz Białkowski	Goalkeeper	Poland	1	
2019	2	Luke Chambers	Defender	England	—	
2020	3	Not awarded (Note: No Player of the Year award was given due to the COVID-19 pandemic and the early curtailment of the 2019–20 season, and the cancellation of the Supporters' Club annual event.)	—	—	—	
2021	3	James Wilson	Defender	Wales	1	
2022	3	Wes Burns	Midfielder	Wales	10	
2023	3	Conor Chaplin	Forward	England	—	
2024	2	Sam Morsy	Midfielder	Egypt	9	
2025	1	Liam Delap	Forward	England	--	
2026	2	Azor Matusiwa‡	Midfielder	Netherlands	—	

== Wins by playing position ==
Ipswich Town F.C. Player of the Year winners by playing position
Position (Note: Stockwell and Zondervan have been classed as midfielders.)	Number of winners (Note: Multiple winners are counted multiple times.)
Goalkeeper	6
Defender	20
Midfielder	18
Striker	8

== Wins by nationality ==
Ipswich Town F.C. Player of the Year winners by nationality
Nationality	Number of winners
England	22
Scotland	7
Ireland	5
Netherlands	5
Poland	3
Northern Ireland	2
Canada	2
Wales	2
Argentina	1
Finland	1
France	1
New Zealand	1
Egypt	1

== See also ==
- Category:Ipswich Town F.C. players
- Ipswich Town F.C.#Current squad
