= Mauricio Taricco =

Argentine footballer (born 1973)

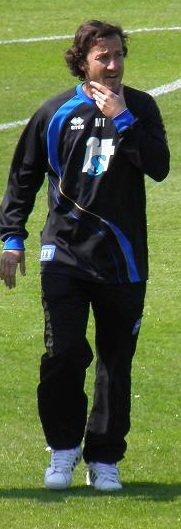
- Taricco in a training session as assistant manager of Brighton & Hove Albion in 2011

Personal information
- Full name: Mauricio Ricardo Taricco
- Date of birth: 10 March 1973 (age 53)
- Place of birth: Buenos Aires, Argentina
- Height: 1.74 m (5 ft 9 in)
- Position: Full-back

Youth career
- Argentinos Juniors

Senior career*
Years	Team	Apps	(Gls)
1993–1994	Argentinos Juniors	21	(0)
1994–1998	Ipswich Town	137	(4)
1998–2004	Tottenham Hotspur	130	(2)
2004	West Ham United	1	(0)
2005–2009	Villasimius		
2009	Castiadas		
2010–2012	Brighton & Hove Albion	15	(0)
Total		304	(6)

Managerial career
- 2009–2013: Brighton & Hove Albion (assistant)
- 2013–2015: Sunderland (assistant)
- 2015–2016: AEK Athens (assistant)
- 2016: Real Betis (assistant)
- 2016–2017: Shanghai Shenhua (assistant)
- 2018: Bordeaux (assistant)
- 2022–2024: Greece (assistant)
- 2024–2025: Jeonbuk Hyundai Motors (assistant)
- * Club domestic league appearances and goals

Mauricio Ricardo Taricco (born 10 March 1973) is an Argentine professional football coach and former player who was most recently the assistant coach of K League 1 side Jeonbuk Hyundai Motors.

Taricco, whose father was Italian and hailed from Sardinia, was as a full-back capable of playing as right or left back who initially played from 1993 to 2004. He began his career in his native Argentina for Argentinos Juniors before transferring to England, where he spent the next ten years representing Ipswich Town, Tottenham Hotspur and West Ham United. He suffered a hamstring injury on his debut for West Ham and agreed to cancel his contract after the game, retiring from professional football. He later played for Italian lower league sides Villasimius and Castiadas, before later joining Brighton & Hove Albion as an assistant manager to Gus Poyet in 2009. He also resumed his professional playing career at Brighton for the 2010–11 season, before retiring for a second time at the end of the 2012–13 season.

He would go on to follow Poyet to Sunderland, AEK Athens, Real Betis, Shanghai Shenhua, Bordeaux, the Greece national team and Jeonbuk Hyundai Motors.

== Playing career ==
=== Argentinos Juniors ===
Taricco began his football career at Buenos Aires club Argentinos Juniors, coming through the club's famous youth team to make his first team debut in 1993. After only one season in the first team, he moved to English side Ipswich Town.

=== Ipswich Town ===
In September 1994, Taricco joined Ipswich Town for around £150,000 after then Ipswich Town manager John Lyall looked for new players in South America. He was signed alongside Uruguayan Adrián Paz, who played at Estudiantes. Both were represented by FIFA agent, Marcelo Houseman, brother of 1978 FIFA World Cup champion René Houseman.

Taricco made his debut in a League Cup match which ended as a 3–0 home loss against Bolton Wanderers, playing the whole match in his sole appearance of the season, which saw Ipswich Town relegated from Premier League. On 26 August 1995, Taricco played his first league match under manager George Burley, who replaced Lyall midway in the previous season. The match against West Bromwich Albion ended 0–0. He quickly made an impression as a solid defender blessed with immaculate passing ability and considerable attacking flair, and he went on to make 47 appearances that season.

During the 1996–97 season, Taricco scored his first goal for Ipswich Town in a 5–2 win over Reading and his second on 8 March 1997 in a 1–0 away win over Stoke City. His performances earned him the 1997 Player of the Year, an award he received on 18 April, just before a match against rivals Norwich City. Taricco confirmed his popularity by scoring in that match, which ended in a 2–0 win for Ipswich Town. Ipswich finished in fourth place in the 1996–97 First Division, and were beaten by Sheffield United on away goals in the 1997 First Division play-offs semi-final. He further endeared himself to the Ipswich fans by leaving the Portman Road pitch in tears after the elimination. In total, Taricco played a 53 matches during the season.

In the 1997–98 season, Taricco made another 53 appearances for Ipswich Town, reaching the quarter-finals of the 1997–98 Football League Cup before losing to Chelsea in a penalty shoot-out after a 2–2 draw in regular time, in which Taricco scored. He also scored in the 2–0 win against Manchester United in the previous round. Ipswich Town again reached the First Division play-offs after finishing fifth, but lost twice to Charlton Athletic in the semi-finals. That season, Taricco was named in the PFA Team of the Year.

Taricco continued his good form at the start of 1998–99, which included a spectacular goal following a run from inside his own half against Crystal Palace on 3 October 1998. His final game for the club turned out to be a 2–0 win against Wolverhampton Wanderers on 3 November 1998, when he was stretchered off in the last few minutes. He played a total of 137 league matches, scoring four goals.

In November 1998, Ipswich Town accepted an offer of £1.75 million for Taricco from Premier League club Tottenham Hotspur.

=== Tottenham Hotspur ===
After injury delayed his transfer for a month, Taricco joined Tottenham Hotspur on 4 December 1998, becoming George Graham's first signing at the club. His Premier League debut came on 16 January 1999 against Wimbledon in a goalless draw, with his full debut being another 0–0 draw on 6 February 1999 against Coventry City. Taricco ended his first season with 13 league appearances. He did not take part in the 1998–99 Football League Cup triumph since he was cup-tied.

Taricco earned a regular starting role as left-back ahead of Justin Edinburgh and Paolo Tramezzani. He played a total of 29 league matches in the 1999–2000 season. In the summer of 2000, after Ben Thatcher was signed as left-back option, Ipswich Town tried to sign Taricco back, but the deal was rejected. The Argentine played only five times in the 2000–01 season, being sidelined for most of the season due to injuries. He returned as a starter in the following season as a right-back, filling in for the injured Stephen Carr and playing 30 Premier League matches in the season, even though he missed five matches for consecutive sending offs against Manchester United and Chelsea in March 2002. Taricco also played in the 2002 Football League Cup Final where his side lost to Blackburn Rovers.

Taricco faced greater competition during the 2002–03 season as Carr recovered from his injury, returning to the left-back position. He played only 21 Premier League matches and scored his first goal for Spurs in a 3–2 loss against Liverpool. Following Thatcher's departure to Leicester City, Taricco played 32 league matches during the 2003–04 season, scoring once against Leeds United early on 23 August 2003. His temperament came into question following spats with Chelsea's Scott Parker and Damien Duff in April 2004, and Taricco was banned for the first three matches of the 2004–05 season.

In the summer of 2004, Taricco was overlooked by new manager Jacques Santini, who favoured the recently signed Erik Edman at left-back. He also failed to impress Martin Jol, who was appointed in November 2004, and was released in the same month.

=== West Ham United ===
On 19 November 2004, shortly after being made a free agent, Taricco signed for West Ham United. He made his debut for the League Championship club as a starter in the Dockers derby against Millwall only two days after signing, but tore his hamstring and was replaced in the first half. Although the injury would have had him sidelined for eight weeks, he offered to have his contract with the club cancelled, which the club accepted, claiming he would not be able to contribute if he was having treatment for over two months. At the time, Alan Pardew, his manager, commented that it was one of the most honest things he had ever known a footballer to do. Shortly after, he confirmed his retirement from professional football.

=== Italian amateur football ===
Taricco, who had stated his desire to play in Italian football during his Tottenham Hotspur tenure, joined amateur Sardinian club Villasimius in 2005, who then competed in Eccellenza Sardinia, in the fifth tier of Italian football. He stayed at the club for four years before joining Castiadas, who also played at Eccellenza Sardinia, on 6 August 2009. In November 2009, he left Castiadas in order to become assistant manager to Gus Poyet, his former teammate at Tottenham Hotspur, at EFL League One club Brighton & Hove Albion.

=== Brighton & Hove Albion ===
Despite joining Brighton & Hove Albion as assistant manager, Taricco returned to professional football after almost six years from his last professional appearance starting at left-back for an FA Cup fixture against Woking on 16 November 2010, with Brighton winning the game on penalties. He was sent off for a second bookable offence after 105 minutes. Taricco went on to play four league matches as Brighton won the League One title.

After playing less than an hour in a 3–1 defeat against Crystal Palace on 27 September 2011, and not featuring in the playing squad against his former club Ipswich Town, Taricco announced his retirement from professional football on 3 October 2011, only to come back out of retirement weeks after when he played against Birmingham City on 29 October. He was sent off again, this time receiving a straight red card, during the 3–0 away defeat to Championship League leaders Southampton on 19 November. Taricco played his last match in a 3–0 win against Southampton on 2 January 2012.

== Coaching career ==
On 10 November 2009, it was announced that Taricco would be assistant manager to Gus Poyet at English team Brighton & Hove Albion. During his spell, he also played 15 league matches after being away from professional football for six years. When manager Poyet left the club in June 2013, Taricco also left his position.

On 8 October 2013, Taricco joined Sunderland, again as assistant manager to Poyet. When Poyet was sacked on 16 March 2015 after a poor run of results, Taricco also left the club.

Taricco followed Poyet at AEK Athens, when the Uruguayan has been named manager of the Greek club on 30 October 2015.

After Poyet was hired by Real Betis on 9 May 2016, Taricco joined the Spanish club as assistant manager.

On 29 November 2016, Taricco joined Shanghai Greenland Shenhua, still again as assistant coach to Poyet.

On 20 January 2018, after Poyet was named manager at Bordeaux, he joined the club as an assistant coach alongside Fernando Menegazzo.

== Honours ==
Tottenham Hotspur

- Football League Cup runner-up: 2001–02

Individual

- Ipswich Town Player of the Year: 1996–97
- PFA Team of the Year: 1997–98 First Division
