= Colin Viljoen =

England international footballer

Personal information
- Date of birth: 20 June 1948 (age 78)
- Place of birth: Johannesburg, South Africa
- Height: 5 ft 8 in (1.73 m)
- Position: Midfielder

Youth career
- Johannesburg Rangers

Senior career*
Years	Team	Apps	(Gls)
1966–1978	Ipswich Town	305	(45)
1978–1980	Manchester City	27	(0)
1980–1982	Chelsea	20	(0)
1982–1983	Southall		
Total		352	(45)

International career
1975	England	2	(0)
- * Club domestic league appearances and goals

Colin Viljoen (born 20 June 1948) is a retired footballer who played in midfield for English teams Ipswich Town, Manchester City and Chelsea. Born in South Africa, he won two caps for England under manager Don Revie.

== Biography ==
Born in Johannesburg, Viljoen was signed from the Johannesburg Rangers' Colts team by Ipswich in 1966. He spent 12 years at Portman Road, playing 305 games and winning two caps for England, both coming in a four-day spell in May 1975. A goalless draw with Northern Ireland in Belfast was followed by a 2–2 draw with Wales at Wembley, both games in the Home International Championship. Viljoen contributed to Ipswich's victorious 1977–78 FA Cup campaign, making four appearances and scoring twice during the run. However, he was not part of the squad for the final itself. In 1978, he moved on to Manchester City before signing for Chelsea for £60,000 in 1980. He was released by the club at the end of the 1981–82 season and signed for non-League Southall.

== Post-retirement life ==
After retiring, Viljoen bought and ran The Nine Styles pub in Uxbridge. He subsequently moved back to South Africa, first to Johannesburg, and then to Alberton, where he coaches youth football.

== Honours ==
Individual

- Ipswich Town Player of the Year: 1974–75

== See also ==
- List of England international footballers born outside England
