= Romeo Zondervan =

Dutch footballer (born 1959)

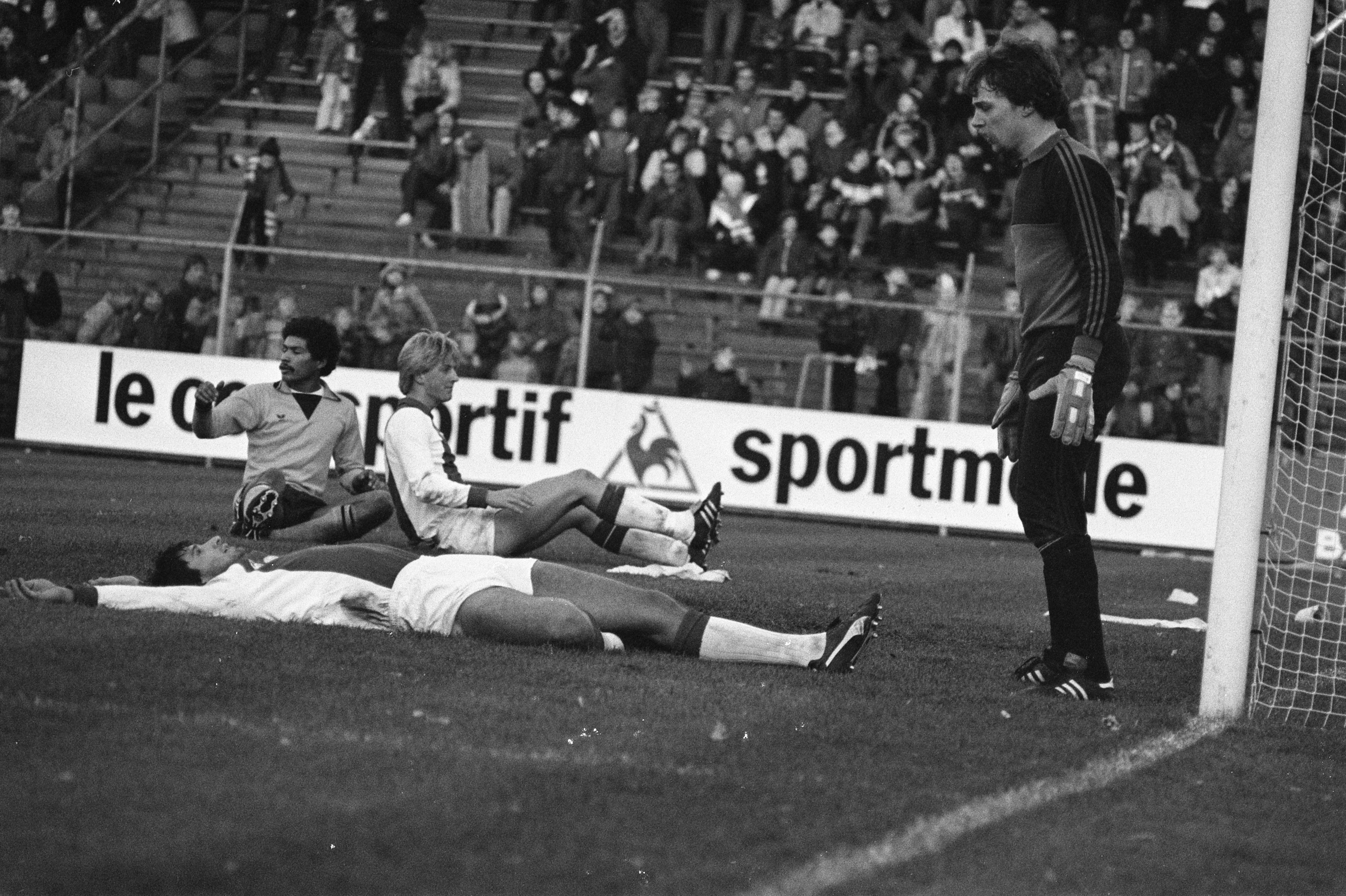
- Tschen La Ling on the ground after a missed chance, on the left Zondervan and on the right Wim Kieft, during a match between Ajax and FC Twente in 1980

Personal information
- Full name: Romeo Eugene Zondervan
- Date of birth: 4 March 1959 (age 67)
- Place of birth: Paramaribo, Suriname
- Height: 1.75 m (5 ft 9 in)
- Position: Midfielder

Senior career*
Years	Team	Apps	(Gls)
1977–1978	FC Den Haag	36	(1)
1978–1982	FC Twente	102	(3)
1982–1984	West Bromwich Albion	84	(5)
1984–1992	Ipswich Town	274	(13)
1992–1995	NAC Breda	26	(0)
Total		522	(22)

International career
1981	Netherlands	1	(0)
- * Club domestic league appearances and goals

Romeo Eugene Zondervan (born 4 March 1959) is a Dutch former professional footballer who played as a midfielder. He played his early football with FC Den Haag and FC Twente before joining West Bromwich Albion, for whom he made 84 appearances. He signed for Ipswich Town in 1984 for £70,000 and went on to make 274 appearances for the club. Then he moved to Dutch club NAC Breda in 1992 and played there until 1995, and then finished his playing career. He made one appearance for the Netherlands national team.

== Club career ==
=== Dutch league clubs ===
Zondervan was born in Paramaribo in Suriname. He started his professional football career in The Netherlands with ADO Den Haag before moving to FC Twente.

=== West Bromwich Albion ===
Zondervan moved to England and joined former FC Twente team mate Martin Jol at West Bromwich Albion in March 1982 making his debut as a substitute against Middlesbrough. His biggest game was in his first season in the FA Cup semi-final against Queens Park Rangers which they lost 1–0.

=== Ipswich Town ===
Zondervan was "discarded" by West Bromwich Albion's new manager, Johnny Giles, and signed for Ipswich for £70,000, making his debut against Watford in March 1984. Ipswich were relegated to the Second Division in 1986 and Zondervan was named Ipswich Town F.C. Player of the Year the following year in 1987. During the 1988–89 and 1989–90 seasons, he captained the club. His last season at Ipswich saw them win promotion to the newly formed Premier League in 1992. In an interview with The Daily Telegraph, Zondervan stated that "my football days at Ipswich were the best in my career".

=== Return to the Netherlands ===
After winning promotion with Ipswich, Zondervan was offered a five-year contract with NAC Breda where he later retired.

== International career ==
Zondervan made 15 appearances for the Dutch Under-21s. He was selected to play for his country as part of the Dutch qualification campaign for UEFA Euro 1980. His only appearance in the full team came in a 3–0 victory over Cyprus in February 1981.

== Later career ==
After retiring as a player, Zondervan went on to scout in Europe for Ipswich under George Burley. He was also the agent for Collins John, whose sale from FC Twente to Fulham came under scrutiny from the Royal Dutch Football Association in 2004. It was believed that Zondervan was not correctly registered with FIFA, but it was later determined that Zondervan was not involved in the transfer.

== Personal life ==
Zondervan is a fully qualified pilot. He was arrested at British customs after they discovered a friend of his was carrying pornographic material from the Netherlands. British tabloid, The Sun, referred to him as the "Porno King". He has three sons.

== Honours ==
Ipswich Town

- Football League Second Division: 1991–92

Individual

- Ipswich Town Player of the Year: 1986–87
