= Owen Slot =

British sports journalist

Owen Slot (born 1967) is a British author and journalist. He is chief sports writer of The Times and Sunday Times.

Slot was educated at Bradfield College before going up to Durham University. He joined The Times as a sports writer in 2002, becoming its chief rugby correspondent in 2014.

In addition to his other books, Slot was ghostwriter for Jonny, the autobiography of Jonny Wilkinson.

== Bibliography ==
- Slot, Owen (2004). The Finishing Line. Hodder & Stoughton. ISBN 0340824638.
- ——— (2005). The Proposal. Hodder & Stoughton. ISBN 0340824654.
- ——— (2012). Cycling for Gold. Puffin Books. ISBN 0141332182.
- ——— (2012). Running for Gold. Puffin Books. ISBN 0141332174.
- ——— (2016). The Talent Lab: How to Turn Potential into World-Beating Success. Ebury Press. ISBN 1785031775.
- Dallaglio, Lawrence; ——— (2023). The Boys of Winter. ISBN 1788706552.
