= Lee Durrant =

English footballer

Personal information
- Full name: Lee Roger Durrant
- Date of birth: 18 December 1973 (age 52)
- Place of birth: Great Yarmouth, England
- Position: Midfielder

Youth career
- 1990–1992: Ipswich Town

Senior career*
| Years | Team | Apps | (Gls) |
| 1992–1996 | Ipswich Town | 7 | (0) |
| 1996–1997 | Harwich & Parkeston | | |
| 1997–2007 | Lowestoft Town | | |
- Lowestoft Town
| Total | | 7 | (0) |
- * Club domestic league appearances and goals

Lee Roger Durrant (born 18 December 1973 in Great Yarmouth) is an English former professional football midfielder. He represented England as a schoolboy.

Durrant began his career as a trainee with Ipswich Town, turning professional in July 1992. His league debut came on 12 March 1994, a 1–0 win away to Aston Villa in the Premiership. He played six further league games for Ipswich that season, with his final first team appearance coming on 13 December 1995 as Ipswich hosted Italian side Salernitana in the Anglo-Italian Cup.

He was released in May 1996 and went on trial with Northampton Town. He joined Torquay United on trial on 22 July 1996. He played in the friendly against Portsmouth but went off with an injury. He left Torquay by his own choice on 1 August and subsequently joined Harwich & Parkeston.

In July 1997 he moved to Lowestoft Town. He later had an eight-month absence from the game before returning to play for Lowestoft.
