= Mick Stockwell =

English footballer and manager (born 1965)

Personal information
- Full name: Michael Thomas Stockwell
- Date of birth: 14 February 1965 (age 61)
- Place of birth: Chelmsford, England
- Height: 5 ft 9 in (1.75 m)
- Position: Midfielder

Youth career
- 1982–1985: Ipswich Town

Senior career*
Years	Team	Apps	(Gls)
1985–2000	Ipswich Town	506	(36)
2000–2003	Colchester United	131	(22)
2003	Heybridge Swifts	0	(0)
2003–2007	Woodbridge Town	?	(?)
Total		637	(58)

Managerial career
- 2004–2007: Woodbridge Town
- * Club domestic league appearances and goals

Michael Thomas Stockwell (born 14 February 1965) is an English football manager and former professional footballer.

As a player he was a midfielder from 1985 until 2007. He spent eighteen years of his career at Ipswich Town, notching up 506 league appearances for the club and taking part in several Premier League seasons. He moved on to Colchester United in 2000, where he ended his professional career three years later. He then spent time as player-coach of Non-league side Heybridge Swifts before becoming player-manager of Woodbridge Town.

== Playing career ==
=== Ipswich Town ===
Mick Stockwell was part of the very successful youth system set up by Bobby Robson at Ipswich Town, joining as a 16 year old in 1981. He also represented England at Youth level. He was a highly rated player during his career, playing 610 games for Ipswich from 1982 to 2000, scoring 44 goals. Renowned for his reliability and stamina, Stockwell played every position during his career apart from goalkeeper. He mostly played as right back or on the right of midfield but sometimes as an emergency striker, including scoring 2 goals against Leicester City at Filbert Street in a 2-1 win in October 1990. His nickname "Stumper" was given to him by Robson after he stumped Robson out during a cricket match. By the late 1980s he had established himself as a first-team player. He played a vital role in the 1991/1992 Second Division championship winning team and featured in the very first season of the new English Premiership, being named Player of the Year. Stockwell was granted a testimonial game by Ipswich in 1994 with Ipswich playing Robson's FC Porto. Whilst playing in the Premiership he was one of Ipswich's highest rated players until Ipswich were relegated in 1995. Stockwell remained as a mainstay with the Tractor Boys for the remainder of the 1990s reaching the First Division play-offs in 1996/97, 1997/98 and 1998/99. He was named players' Player of the Year in 1997/98. In his last season with Ipswich he was part of the team that finally won the First Division play-offs in 1999/00 before being released. As an Ipswich player he was also an FA Cup quarter-finalist and League Cup semi-finalist.

He was released in 2000 and both Norwich City and Colchester United attempted to sign Stockwell. He looked set to sign for Ipswich's local rivals Norwich however the deal collapsed after he was made to wait an extra week by Norwich before signing. Due to this Stockwell instead opted to join Colchester United.

=== Colchester United ===
Micky Stockwell signed for Colchester in 2000 and instantly made an impact. He went on to play 145 games for Colchester scoring 24 goals. He was a vital part in Phil Parkinson's Colchester team until he retired in 2003 due to a major back injury. After a long career Micky Stockwell finished his career in football after playing over 700 professional games scoring 68 goals.

== Coaching career ==
After retirement from the professional game, in 2003 he first became a player-coach at Heybridge Swifts but left after a couple of months. He then joined Woodbridge Town as a player, before later becoming in 2004 the manager. He was manager until October 2007 where Mick and Woodbridge town came to a mutual agreement to part company.

== Personal life ==
As well as often working as a co-commentator on Ipswich games, Stockwell has his own business "Mick Stockwell Fitting Services" fitting kitchens and bathrooms.

== Honours ==
Ipswich Town

- Football League Second Division: 1991–92
- Football League First Division play-offs: 2000

Individual

- Ipswich Town Player of the Year: 1992–93
- Ipswich Town Hall of Fame: Inducted 2013
- Colchester United Player of the Year: 2000–01
