= Adam Tanner (footballer) =

English association football player

Personal information
- Full name: Adam David Tanner
- Date of birth: 25 October 1973 (age 52)
- Place of birth: Maldon, England
- Height: 6 ft 0 in (1.83 m)
- Position: Midfielder

Senior career*
Years	Team	Apps	(Gls)
1992–2000	Ipswich Town	72	(7)
2000	Peterborough United	0	(0)
2000–2001	Colchester United	4	(0)
2001–2002	Canvey Island	43	(8)
Total		119	(15)
- * Club domestic league appearances and goals

Adam David Tanner (born 25 October 1973) is an English former professional footballer.

== Career ==
Tanner began his career with Ipswich and signed a professional contract at the start of the 1992–93 season, not making a league debut until 2 January 1995 in which season Ipswich were relegated from the Premier League

On 4 February 1997, Tanner was suspended by the Football Association for three months when a drugs test uncovered traces of cocaine in his blood.

In November 1999, Tanner was arrested after colliding with a parked car in Witham. As he failed to stop at the scene of the accident he was later arrested and a blood test showed that he was three times over the legal alcohol limit for driving. In January 2000 he admitted the offence in court. In February 2000 he was spared a prison sentence and instead ordered to do 80 hours of community service, placed on probation for 12 months, banned from driving for three years and released by Ipswich in the same month.

He joined Peterborough United, but failed to make a first team appearance and was released. He signed for Colchester United at the start of the 2000–01 season, before exiting Layer Road on 23 January 2001 and signing for non-league Canvey Island.
