= Clive Baker (footballer, born 1959) =

English footballer

Personal information
- Full name: Clive Edward Baker
- Date of birth: 14 March 1959 (age 67)
- Place of birth: West Runton, England
- Height: 5 ft 9 in (1.75 m)
- Position: Goalkeeper

Senior career*
Years	Team	Apps	(Gls)
1977–1984	Norwich City	14	(0)
1984–1991	Barnsley	291	(0)
1991–1992	Coventry City	0	(0)
1992–1994	Ipswich Town	48	(0)
Total		353	(0)
- * Club domestic league appearances and goals

Clive Edward Baker (born 14 March 1959) is an English former professional footballer who played as a goalkeeper for Norwich City, Barnsley and Coventry City in the Football League and for Ipswich Town in the Premier League.

Baker was born in West Runton, Norfolk. He began his career at Norwich City in July 1977 appearing 14 times in his 7 years at the club. From Norwich he moved to Barnsley where he again played for seven years, this time racking up 291 appearances and twice winning the club's Player of the Year award. He was transferred to Coventry City in August 1991, and a year later, without having appeared for Coventry's Football League team, he moved to his final club, Ipswich Town. He retired from professional football in the 1994–95 season as one of only a few to play for both Ipswich Town and Norwich City. After his retirement from football he moved into a job in the insurance industry in London.

== Honours ==
Individual

- Barnsley Player of the Year: 1985–86
