= Chris Kiwomya =

English footballer (born 1969)

Personal information
- Full name: Christopher Mark Kiwomya
- Date of birth: 2 December 1969 (age 56)
- Place of birth: Huddersfield, England
- Position: Forward

Senior career*
Years	Team	Apps	(Gls)
1987–1995	Ipswich Town	224	(51)
1995–1998	Arsenal	14	(3)
1997	→ Le Havre (loan)	7	(0)
1997	→ Selangor (loan)	12	(7)
1998–2001	Queens Park Rangers	86	(25)
2001–2002	AaB	4	(0)
Total		346	(86)

International career
- England U21

Managerial career
- 2008–2011: Ipswich Town (reserve team coach)
- 2013: Notts County
- 2021–2024: British Virgin Islands
- * Club domestic league appearances and goals

Christopher Mark Kiwomya (born 2 December 1969) is an English football manager and former professional footballer, who was the manager of British Virgin Islands national football team.

He played as a forward from 1987 until 2002 notably in the Premier League for Ipswich Town and Arsenal. He also played in the Football League for Queens Park Rangers, as well as playing abroad for Le Havre, Selangor and AaB. He also played for the England U21 team. After retiring as a player, he went on to gain his UEFA Pro Licence from the English FA and has coached and managed at clubs including Arsenal Academy and Ipswich. In 2013 he had a spell as manager of Notts County.

== Playing career ==
Kiwomya was born in Huddersfield. He was at Ipswich Town as a trainee and played over 250 games and was the club's top scorer in the 1991–92 season in which Ipswich were promoted from the old Second Division. In total, he scored 62 goals for the East Anglian club, working in partnership with Jason Dozzell. Whilst at Ipswich he played for England U21s, preventing him playing for the Uganda national team, which he qualified for through his parentage.

He signed for Arsenal in a £1.25 million deal in January 1995, as one of George Graham's last signings for the club, along with John Hartson.

He made his debut against Everton on 14 January 1995 and was rarely out of the side that campaign. Kiwomya scored his first goal for Arsenal in the 1–0 win over Nottingham Forest in February 1995. He made his European debut against Auxerre, on 2 March 1995 and was an unused substitute in the European Cup Winner's Cup Final match between Arsenal and Real Zaragoza. Kiwomya scored three goals in 17 appearances in 1994–95. Graham had been sacked in February for a highly publicised "bungs" incident, and Stewart Houston had remained in charge until the appointment of Bruce Rioch after the end of the season. The acquisition of Dennis Bergkamp, as well as competition from the likes of Ian Wright and Hartson, left Kiwomya down the pecking order. He never played a competitive game for Arsenal again.

He spent 1996–97 on loan at Le Havre in France, making seven appearances. He also spent time with Selangor in the Malaysian league, scoring the winning goal in the Malaysia Cup Final in December 1997. In August 1998, more than three years after his last game for Arsenal, he finally left Highbury on a free transfer and signed for QPR in Division One. He played for QPR for three seasons, scoring 30 times in almost 100 appearances, before joining AaB in Denmark in 2001, on a free transfer, but cancelled his contract by mutual consent due to injury and subsequently called time on his professional football career following a trial with Grimsby Town in early 2002 in which he failed to earn a contract.

== Coaching career ==
Kiwomya started his coaching career with Arsenal Academy, coaching the U14 team in the 2007–08 season. In July 2008, he was appointed as reserve team development coach at Ipswich Town. by then manager, Jim Magilton. When Roy Keane became manager, he became youth team manager, managing the U18s, but then was promoted by Keane for the 2010–11 season back into the Reserve Team role. His Reserve Team won the Football Combination East Division in the 2010–11 season. He helped to develop youth players including Jordan Rhodes, who was sold on to Huddersfield and Connor Wickham, who was later sold to Sunderland He left the position in May 2011.

== Managerial career ==
Kiwomya was appointed to set up a development squad at Notts County in February 2012 under manager Keith Curle. He was appointed caretaker manager of Notts County on 3 February 2013 following the sacking of Keith Curle. On 27 March 2013, having lost only one of ten games, Kiwomya was appointed full-time manager on a three-year deal. He led the team to 12th position in League One at the end of the 2012–13 season.

In the 2013–14 season, Kiwomya wanted to make Notts County a young team with technically gifted players. In August 2013, he signed Callum McGregor on a five-month loan from Celtic and he scored on his debut on 7 August 2013 in a 3–2 win in the League Cup against Fleetwood Town. Kiwomya's next signing was Jack Grealish on 13 September 2013 from Aston Villa on a youth loan. Grealish made his debut the next day against MK Dons. Kiwomya's team drew with Liverpool away from home in the League Cup. On 27 October 2013, Kiwomya left Notts County by mutual consent.

In 2021, Kiwomya was appointed head coach of the British Virgin Islands national team.

In June 2022 in Kiwomya's first two games, against the Cayman Islands, they drew 1-1 both home and away giving the BVI their first ever points in the Concacaf Nations League competition. The Men's National team had previously lost 9 games in succession dating back to March 2019.

In Kiwomya's 5th game in charge, the BVI Men's National team beat the Turks and Caicos 3-1 at the AO Shirley ground in Tortola giving them their first ever victory in the Nations League and their first win in over 11 years. That game vs Turks and Caicos was on the 9th September 2023.

On the 26th March 2024, Kiwomya was attributed to being BVIs most successful coach when, after playing against the US Virgin Islands for 90 minutes and extra time, the game ended 0-0. The BVI won 4-2 on penalties therefore advancing into the group stages of the Concacaf World Cup qualifying stages for the first time in their history. A remarkable achievement with the population of the British Virgin Island's being around 31,000.

== Personal life ==
Born in England, Kiwomya is of Jamaican & Ugandan descent. His nephew is Alex Kiwomya, the son of his brother Andy Kiwomya.

== Managerial statistics ==
As of 12 October 2024

Managerial record by club and tenure
Team	From	To	Record							
Team	From	To	M	W	D	L	GF	GA	GD	Win %
Notts County	3 February 2013	27 October 2013	34	9	9	16	33	42	−9	26.47
British Virgin Islands	8 October 2021	present	16	2	5	9	10	32	−22	12.50
Total			50	10	15	25	46	76	−30	20.00

== Honours ==
Ipswich Town

- Football League Second Division: 1991–92

Selangor

- Malaysia Cup: 1997

Individual

- Ipswich Town Hall of Fame: Inducted 2017
