= Neil Thompson =

English footballer (born 1963)

Personal information
- Full name: Neil Thompson
- Date of birth: 2 October 1963 (age 63)
- Place of birth: Beverley, England
- Height: 5 ft 10 in (1.78 m)
- Position: Defender

Senior career*
Years	Team	Apps	(Gls)
1980–1981	Nottingham Forest	0	(0)
1981–1983	Hull City	31	(0)
1983–1989	Scarborough	242	(34)
1989–1996	Ipswich Town	206	(19)
1996–1998	Barnsley	27	(5)
1997–1998	→ Oldham Athletic (loan)	8	(0)
1998	→ York City (loan)	12	(2)
1998–2000	York City	30	(6)
2000–2001	Scarborough	27	(3)
2001–2004	Boston United	7	(0)
Total		590	(69)

Managerial career
- 1999–2000: York City
- 2000–2001: Scarborough
- 2002–2004: Boston United
- 2020–2021: Sheffield Wednesday (caretaker)
- 2023: Sheffield Wednesday (caretaker)
- * Club domestic league appearances and goals

Neil Thompson (born 2 October 1963) is an English former professional footballer who played as a defender. He played for Scarborough, Ipswich Town and Barnsley amongst others.

== Playing career ==
Thompson was born in Beverley, East Riding of Yorkshire. Whilst at Barnsley he played in the 1997–98 Premier League with the South Yorkshire club, appearing in three matches as a starter.

== Coaching career ==
Thompson subsequently became a football coach and had spells at York City, Scarborough and Boston United as player-manager. He also worked for Leeds United Reserves team. Following the termination of Tony Pulis as Sheffield Wednesday manager, he would take on the role of caretaker manager on 28 December 2020 which would last for thirteen games until 1 March 2021, when Darren Moore was appointed permanent manager. On 13 January 2022, Thompson would take on the roll of manager for Wednesday's U23 side, following Lee Bullen taking the managers job at Ayr United. He would be made caretaker manager of Sheffield Wednesday again following the dismissal of Xisco Muñoz on 4 October 2023. He would be in charge of just one game, a 0-0 draw against former manager Darren Moore's new club, Huddersfield Town before stepping down once Danny Röhl was appointed the new manager of the club. After 14 years, he left the club having been a first-team coach under managers Gary Megson, Dave Jones, Stuart Gray, Garry Monk, Tony Pulis, Darren Moore and Danny Röhl as well as being U23 manager, guiding them to the title in the 2016–17 season.

== Managerial statistics ==
As of match played 7 October 2023

Managerial record by team and tenure
Team	From	To	Record					Ref
Team	From	To	P	W	D	L	Win %	Ref
York City	16 March 1999	9 February 2000	45	11	11	23	24.4	
Scarborough	1 October 2000	21 September 2001	45	10	20	15	22.2	
Boston United	8 July 2002	13 February 2004	83	26	21	36	31.3	
Sheffield Wednesday (caretaker)	28 December 2020	1 March 2021	13	6	0	7	46.2	
Sheffield Wednesday (caretaker)	4 October 2023	13 October 2023	1	0	1	0	0.0	
Total			187	53	53	81	28.3	

== Honours ==
Scarborough

- Football Conference: 1986–87

Ipswich Town

- Football League Second Division: 1991–92

Individual

- Scarborough Player of the Year: 1985–86
- PFA Team of the Year: 1988–89 Fourth Division
