= John Wark =

Scottish footballer

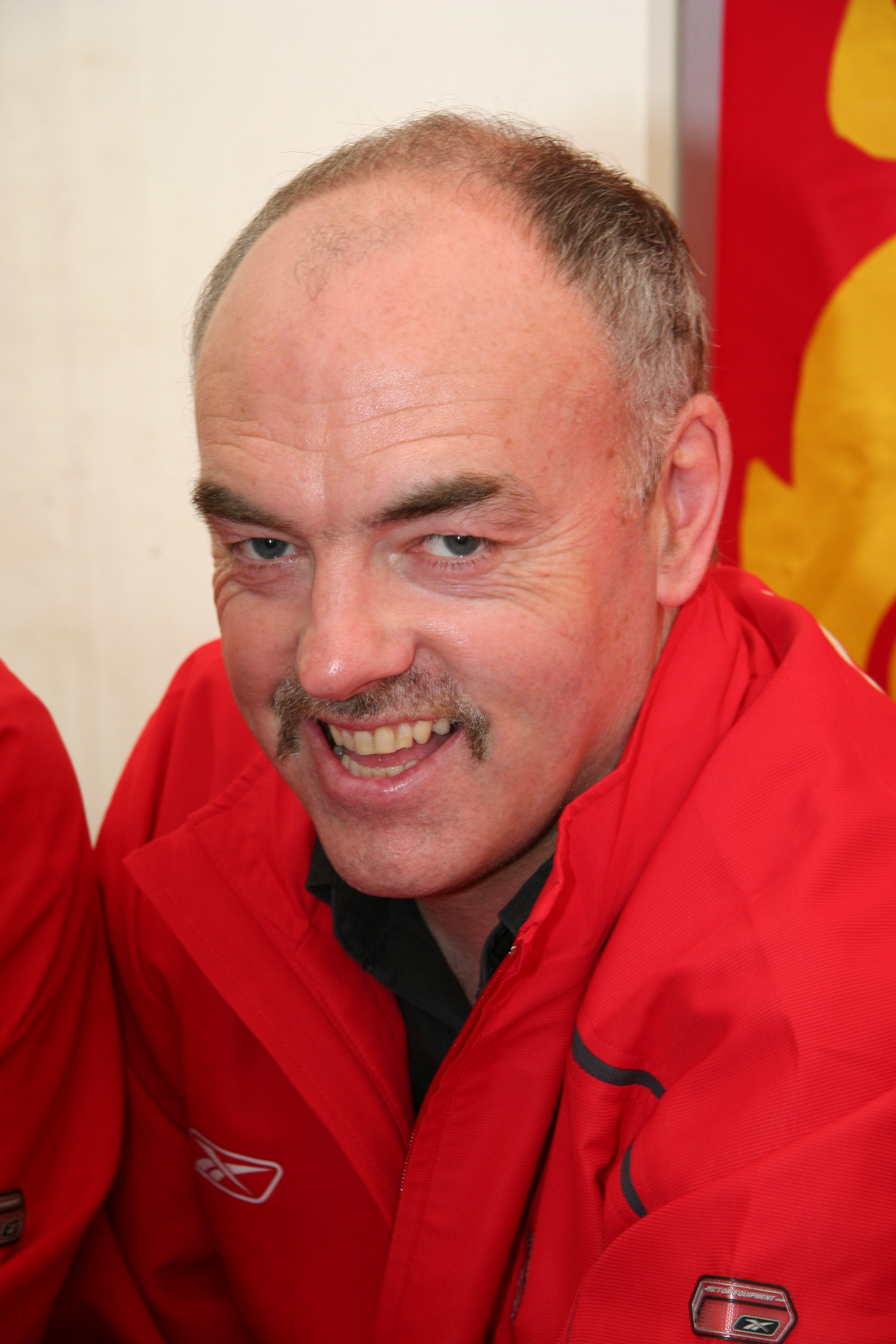
- Wark in 2006

Personal information
- Date of birth: 4 August 1957 (age 69)
- Place of birth: Glasgow, Scotland
- Height: 5 ft 11 in (1.80 m)
- Position: Midfielder

Senior career*
Years	Team	Apps	(Gls)
1975–1984	Ipswich Town	266	(94)
1984–1988	Liverpool	70	(28)
1988–1990	Ipswich Town	89	(23)
1990–1991	Middlesbrough	32	(2)
1991–1997	Ipswich Town	154	(18)
Total		611	(165)

International career
1977–1980	Scotland U21	9	(2)
1979–1984	Scotland	29	(7)
- * Club domestic league appearances and goals

John Wark (born 4 August 1957) is a Scottish former professional footballer who spent most of his playing time with Ipswich Town. He won a record four Player of the Year awards before becoming one of the four inaugural members of the club's Hall of Fame. Wark had long spells at the club, which bookended his career, and a third, brief interlude dividing his briefer periods at Liverpool and Middlesbrough. A versatile player, Wark played most of his professional games as a midfielder, although he sometimes played as a central defender and on occasion as a striker.

Born in Glasgow, Wark represented Scotland in international football, winning 29 caps and scoring seven goals. This included selection for Scotland in the 1982 FIFA World Cup in which he made three appearances and scored twice.

During his playing career, Wark appeared in the film Escape to Victory. Since retiring as a professional player in 1996, he has continued to work for Ipswich Town—since September 2008 in the corporate hospitality department. His autobiography, Wark On, was published in 2009.

== Early life ==
Wark was born on 4 August 1957, in Glasgow Royal Maternity Hospital to parents Alex and Helen. The third of four children, he has an older sister Wilma, older brother Alex and younger brother Andrew. The family lived in a four-storey tenement block in Partick. The family was impoverished: Wark's parents could not afford a cot and as a small child, he slept in a drawer from a sideboard. Although christened John, Wark was soon referred to by his family as Johnny, a diminutive that stuck throughout his footballing career.

In the early 1960s, the family moved to another tenement block, this time in Scotstoun, and Wark's father secured employment at nearby Albion Motors. The new home accommodated a back yard in which Wark played football from the age of six. He said "[f]ootball seemed to occupy 99 per cent of my time as a youngster" as he tried to emulate his brother Alex, who had become a professional at St Mirren. Wark attended Scotstoun Primary School, where he became captain of the football team. On moving to secondary school, he was selected for the Glasgow Schools representative team. He also played for Drumchapel Amateurs at the under-14 level, where he was, for a period, managed by David Moyes' father, also named David.

During Wark's time at Drumchapel, he attracted the attention of Celtic. He trained with the club at their Parkhead ground, before receiving an invitation to sign schoolboy forms for the club. As a lifelong Rangers fan with whom Celtic have a notable rivalry and with interest from "several English clubs", including Bristol City, Manchester City and Ipswich Town, Wark stalled on the offer. He trialled with both Ipswich Town and Manchester City, and selected Ipswich when the latter remained non-committal. On arrival at Portman Road, Town manager Bobby Robson, later described by Wark as the person in football "who had the single biggest influence on [him]", personally welcomed him and Wark signed with the club as an apprentice.

== Club career ==
=== First spell at Ipswich ===
Wark started his career at Ipswich in the youth team, initially playing at left back before moving to the centre of defence and occasionally occupying the right back position. He signed up as a professional for the club on his 17th birthday. Selected for the senior squad as a replacement for the injured Kevin Beattie, Wark made his first-team debut on 27 March 1975 in the 3–2 FA Cup 6th round (3rd replay) victory over Leeds United; (Note: Ipswich and Leeds United had already featured in three draws in the sixth round of the 1974–75 FA Cup. The third match was played at Filbert Street, a neutral venue, and the fourth match—the third replay—at the same location two days later.) the game was played at Leicester City's Filbert Street. A nervous and homesick Wark was reassured by manager Robson:

My debut was in the quarter-final of the FA Cup against the Leeds team of Giles and Bremner. He [Robson] said, 'I wouldn't put you in the team if I didn't think you were good enough'. He was a father figure as well because I was homesick. If it hadn't been for the boss I would have been straight back to Glasgow.

Making four more first-team appearances in place of injured regulars, Wark ended the season still on the youth team, and experienced success in the final of the FA Youth Cup, defeating West Ham United 5–1. He spent much of the 1975–76 season playing for the reserves, and was presented with the club's Young Player of the Year award, despite making just four appearances for the senior team. Moving into midfield, Wark made over 30 appearances in the 1976–77 season, scoring his first goals for the club, (10, in all) taking over penalty kicking duty; he also received his first red card.

In June 1977, Wark was selected for the Scotland squad for the first time, for a friendly match against East Germany; however, a torn hamstring sustained in pre-season training ended any chance of an international debut. The injury also kept him out of first-team football until January 1978, when he returned for a match against Cardiff City in the third round of the 1977–78 FA Cup.

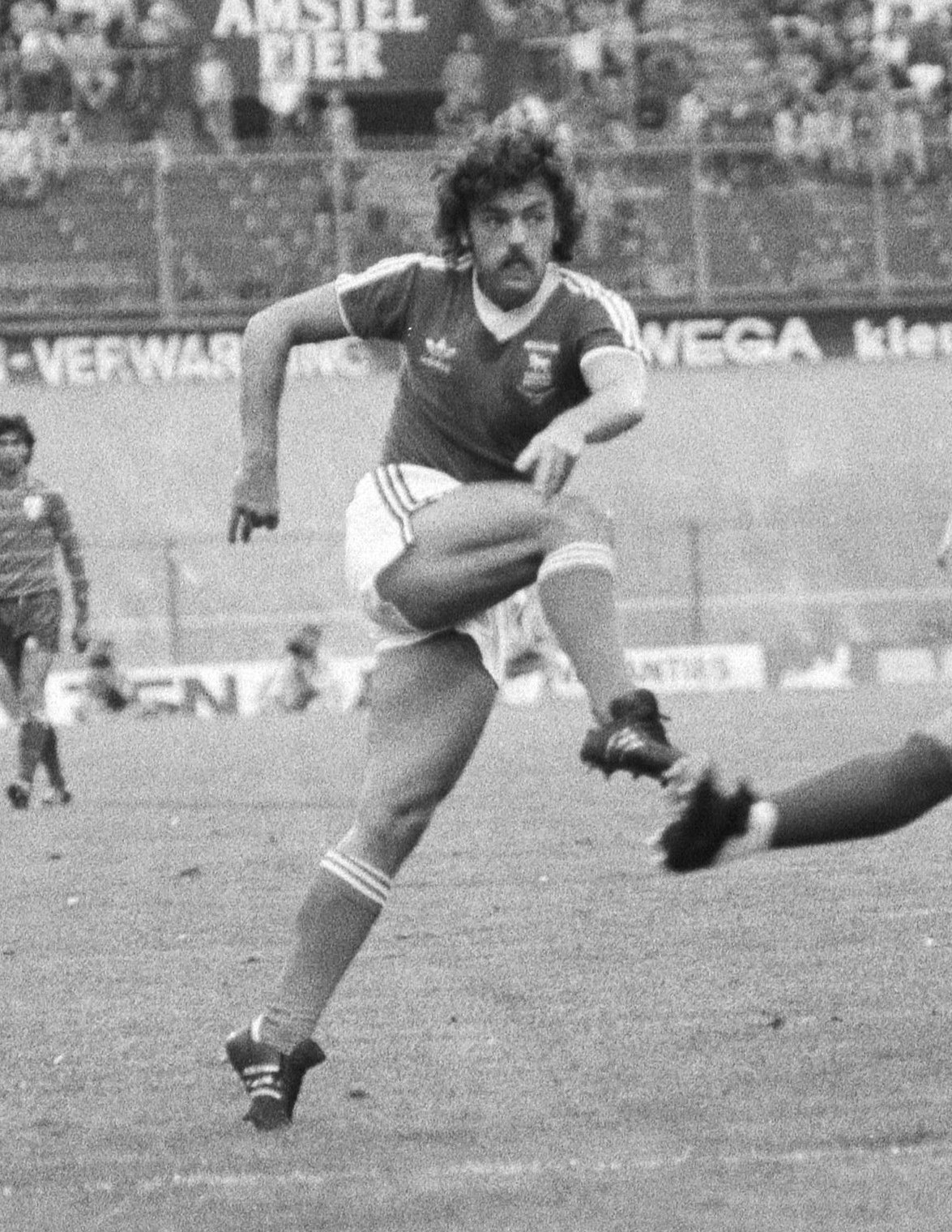
Wark scoring 1-0 for Ipswich in a friendly against East-Belgian club Standard Liège (2-0) in August 1981, final Amsterdam 706-tournament.

Indifferent league performances that season meant that Ipswich finished just three points above the relegation zone, but the season ended in success in the FA Cup. Wark scored in a 3–1 victory over West Bromwich Albion in the semi-final, and appeared in the final at Wembley as part of a side that surprised favourites Arsenal, winning the game 1–0. Wark remarked, "We were underdogs but on the day we hammered them." Wark did not touch the ball for the first 18 minutes of the match, and as the players left the pitch at half-time, David Geddis said to Wark, "Make sure you hit it between the posts in the second-half. Avoid the white bits." In the second half of the game, Wark "ignored Geddis' advice and hit Pat Jennings' right post twice with almost identical swerving right-foot shots from outside the penalty area".

Twice in the three seasons that followed, Ipswich came close to winning the League championship, but finished as runners-up to Liverpool and Aston Villa, respectively. However, Ipswich did win the club's only European trophy when they lifted the 1980–81 UEFA Cup. Wark set a competition record by scoring 14 goals, including two – one in each leg – in the final as Ipswich overcame Dutch side AZ 67 Alkmaar 5–4 on aggregate. Wark's record equalled the long-standing scoring record in a European competition, set by José Altafini of A.C. Milan in the 1962–63 European Cup. (Note: The tally was exceeded by Jürgen Klinsmann, who scored 15 in the 1995–96 UEFA Cup.) Wark's personal triumph that year was to win a European accolade, Young Player of the Year, and gain the acclaim of his fellow professionals in England to earn the PFA Player of the Year award. He ended the 1980–81 season with 36 goals.

Wark continued to play for Ipswich, but after Robson left to become England manager in 1982, the side was gradually broken up by new manager Bobby Ferguson. Following a rejected demand for a wage increase, Wark submitted a transfer request, which was accepted. He signed for Liverpool for £450,000 on 10 March 1984. At the time, Liverpool had won the league title six times, the European Cup three times and the League Cup three times in the preceding eight seasons.

Wark's final full season at Portman Road, 1982–83, had seen him record the highest league goals tally of his career. He scored 20 goals in 42 league games, though it was not enough to prevent Ipswich from slipping to ninth place in the final table – their lowest position since finishing 18th in 1978.

=== Liverpool ===
The medical examination for Wark's transfer somewhat surprised him:

I was rather taken aback when the doctor entered the Anfield boot room", Wark said. "He was small in stature and I could not help but detect the smell of alcohol on his breath as he introduced himself to me. I was even more surprised when he announced we would stay put to conduct the medical examination. "He took my blood pressure, looked at the reading and muttered 'that's fine'. Then something happened that to this day I still cannot get over. He asked me to bend down and touch my toes. "Trying not to show my surprise, I did exactly as he asked and as I lifted my head he spoke again, this time to announce 'you've passed'. That was it, my Liverpool medical.

Wark made his debut for the club on 31 March 1984 in a 2–0 league win against Watford at Vicarage Road, and scored Liverpool's opening goal in the 58th minute. Liverpool won the English league title that season, and Wark made sufficient appearances to earn himself a medal. His unusual ability as a goalscoring midfielder was on display when he finished the 1984–85 season as the club's top goalscorer, ahead of prolific striker Ian Rush, with a tally of 27 goals in 62 appearances—a goal every 2.3 games. Wark's season included three hat-tricks, one each in the League, the FA Cup and the European Cup. Liverpool qualified for the 1985 European Cup Final but the match was overshadowed by the Heysel Stadium Disaster, a tragedy Wark remembers as "a nightmare memory".

In the 1985–86 season, Wark made 18 appearances, scoring six times, but missed out on the club's run-in to their League and FA Cup "double", due to a broken ankle suffered just after the turn of 1986, followed by an Achilles tendon injury. He eventually regained his fitness but struggled to regain his place in the Liverpool team until injury to Steve McMahon allowed him back in. Wark came on as a late substitute (but according to him, never touched the ball) when Liverpool lost the 1987 League Cup Final to Arsenal. No longer a part of manager Kenny Dalglish's plans following the arrival of new midfielders including John Barnes, Wark was sold back to Ipswich on 4 January 1988 for £100,000. In spite of more financially lucrative offers from both Watford and Coventry City, he followed Bobby Robson's advice: "Money isn't everything—go where you will be happiest." Wark left the Merseyside club with a record of 42 goals in 108 appearances, a goal every 2.6 games.

=== Second spell at Ipswich ===
Ipswich had been relegated 18 months before Wark's return to the club and were still playing in the second tier of English football. During this second spell at Ipswich, Wark was close to being an ever-present in the side: he missed just two games in two seasons. He was the club's equal top-scorer in the 1988–89 season, sharing the achievement with forwards Dalian Atkinson and Jason Dozzell.

Following three seasons of mid-table finishes, (Note: Including the season before Wark's return to Ipswich.) manager John Duncan was sacked and replaced by John Lyall. With his contract expiring, Wark received what he considered to be a "derisory" offer from Lyall, which he declined. Once he became a free agent, Wark signed on a free transfer for Second Division rivals Middlesbrough in August 1990. In his two additional seasons with Ipswich, Wark had scored 20 goals, and won the club's Player of the Year award in both seasons.

=== Middlesbrough ===
Wark signed for Middlesbrough, the first club to show "a definite interest" in him, on a two-year contract, moving back to play in the centre of defence. He made regular appearances and helped the team to seventh place by the end of the season and qualification for the Second Division play-offs. Following a 1–1 draw with Notts County at Ayresome Park, Wark was informed by manager Colin Todd that he would not be selected for the second leg. Wark was outraged; Middlesbrough lost the second leg 1–0. Todd departed from the club and was replaced by Lennie Lawrence, who insisted that all players live "within an hour of Ayresome Park". Wark was still living in Ipswich at the time and following a "sensible agreement" with Lawrence, Wark's contract was terminated and he became a free agent again.

=== Third spell at Ipswich ===
Remaining without a club before the start of the 1991–92 season, Wark trained with Ipswich to keep fit, and rejected interest in his services from Leyton Orient, Colchester United and Falkirk. When Ipswich suffered a succession of injuries among their defenders, they offered him a contract, initially on a week-by-week basis, before securing a year-long deal. Wark made 43 appearances in the first season of his third spell with the club. Early results in the season were excellent; the club won seven of their first 11 matches in the league. In the FA Cup, Ipswich progressed to a fifth round encounter against Liverpool; when the tie went to a replay at Anfield, Wark received a standing ovation from both sets of fans. Ipswich lost the match 3–2 after extra time, having led 2–1 in the first period. Ipswich went on to finish strongly in their league campaign and were crowned Second Division champions and promoted into the newly formed Premier League. Wark ended the season as the club's Player of the Year for the third time.

Wark agreed to a new one-year contract for the 1992–93 season and was asked to feature in a Sky Sports advertisement to promote the inaugural Premier League competition. Ipswich were the only Premier League club to remain unbeaten after eight games (a sequence that included Wark's first Premier League goal in a 1–1 draw with Tottenham Hotspur). Ipswich went fourth in February and there was talk of finally winning that title that had eluded them more than once during Wark's first spell there, but 13 consecutive games without a win resulted a 16th-place finish in the table, just three points above the relegation zone, and only a win on the final day of the season made sure of their survival. Wark, now aged 37, secured yet another one-year contract shortly before the end of the 1993–94 season. Ipswich were saved from relegation in the last round of matches (for the second season running, another good start had given way to a late season slump), courtesy of an injury time winning goal scored by Mark Stein of Chelsea at Stamford Bridge, which ensured that Ipswich's fellow strugglers Sheffield United were relegated. Wark went on to be voted the club's Player of the Year for a record fourth time.

Ipswich and Wark fared worse in the 1994–95 season. The club lost 9–0 to Manchester United during a season in which Ipswich "recorded fewer victories and suffered more defeats than in any campaign in the club's history". He was sent off in the away game at Norwich, where the team lost 3–0. Wark made fewer than 20 appearances in the following season, primarily because of a persistent foot injury. Despite his appearance in three more matches in the 1996–97 season, and a testimonial against Arsenal at Portman Road, Wark played his last professional match against Tranmere Rovers on 30 November 1996 at the age of 39. By this stage, he was the club's oldest player. Of a total 826 league matches played by Wark as a professional, he made 679 appearances for Ipswich. As of 5 June 2009, he is Ipswich Town's third-highest all-time scorer, with 179 goals scored for the club, despite rarely appearing as a striker.

== International career ==
From 1979, Wark was selected to play for his country, usually as a defender, eventually winning 29 caps for Scotland and scoring seven goals. Jock Stein was the Scotland manager who gave him his debut, in a game held on 19 May 1979, a British Home Championship match against Wales at Ninian Park; Scotland lost 3–0. Wark scored his first international goal a week later on 26 May, again in a British Home Championship game, this time against England at Wembley. Wark's opening effort was not enough, as Scotland were defeated 3–1. A week later Wark played for Scotland in a friendly against Argentina at Hampden Park. However, the game is best remembered for Diego Maradona scoring his first international goal in helping Argentina to a comfortable 3–1 win.

After a 3–1 home defeat by Belgium in December 1979, Wark was not selected again for his country until February 1981 for the 1982 World Cup qualifying match away against Israel. Following a successful qualification campaign, Wark was included in the Scotland squad that went to the World Cup in Spain under Stein's leadership. Wark played three games and scored two goals, both of which were in Scotland's 5-2 opening match victory over New Zealand. Scotland were knocked out in the group stage.

Wark's final appearance for Scotland came in September 1984, under Stein; he was replaced in favour of Paul McStay at halftime in a 6–1 victory over Yugoslavia.

== Playing style and personality ==
Wark played as a central defender, midfielder and, occasionally, as a striker.

Wark was not a "supremely talented" player, but, according to football journalist Jim White, one who espoused team-work and team spirit: "There is no question that the 'one-for-all, all-for-one' mentality generated in the Anfield dressing room was the engine that drove the great team. With players such as Alan Kennedy, John Wark, Sammy Lee and Craig Johnston, nobody could claim this was a collection of top-notch operators in the manner, say, of the current Real Madrid. Every week, they played as an entity greater than the sum of its parts." He has been described as "a defensive midfielder with an astonishing goalscoring record".

Over the years, Wark has become closely associated with his moustache. Owen Slot described the player as "Ipswich's immortal moustache", while Wark himself notes "it is something of a trademark, even if people are always calling me Bruce".

== Life outside football ==
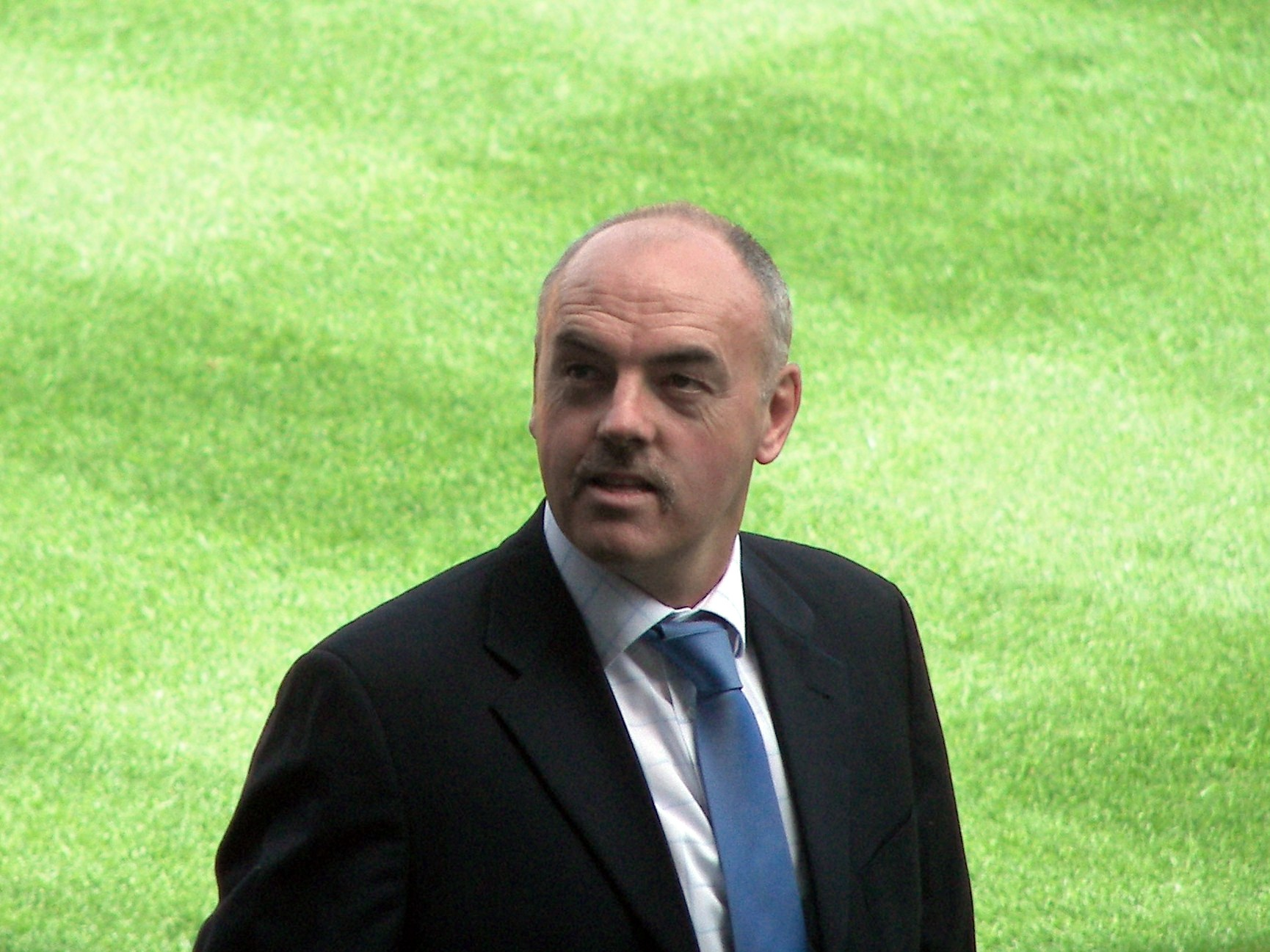
Wark at Portman Road in 2007

=== Personal life ===
Wark has married twice—first to Toula, on 1 July 1981, with whom he has a son, Andrew, born in June 1983. He married Karen at Gretna Green in April 2009.

=== Film appearance ===
In 1981, Wark was one of several Ipswich players who appeared alongside stars including Bobby Moore and Pelé in the Second World War football film Escape to Victory, which starred Sylvester Stallone, Michael Caine and Max von Sydow. Wark played a character called Arthur Hayes, but his only line of dialogue was dubbed due to his broad Glaswegian accent.

=== Since retirement as a player ===
Following his retirement from playing football professionally, Wark continued to live in Suffolk, like many other ex-Ipswich players, including Allan Hunter, Mick Mills, Roger Osborne and Mick Lambert. Despite his retirement from the professional ranks, Wark continued playing football as an amateur, and signed for Woodbridge Town in 1999 alongside former Ipswich team-mate Paul Mason. He also played veterans football for Windsor and Eton, played with Soccer AM's Badgers team at the Millennium Stadium, and has represented the Liverpool veterans in the Sky Sports Masters series.

In 2005, Wark was voted as the BBC television programme Football Focus "all-time cult hero" by Ipswich Town fans. In 2008 Radio Suffolk announced that he would join their commentary team as a summariser, alongside former team-mates Kevin Beattie and Bryan Hamilton. Wark was working in the corporate hospitality department at Ipswich Town in September 2008. As of March 2014, he remains in that job.

=== Autobiography ===
Wark's autobiography Wark On was published on 9 April 2009. The book contained material that gained media interest. Wark sold his [FA Cup Final] tickets for cash to a ticket tout.

== Legacy ==
In 2006 Wark gained the final place in the poll 100 Players Who Shook the Kop, conducted by the liverpoolfc.tv website. The list was compiled as a result of a fan survey: "Over 110,000 supporters all nominated their own personal Top 10 players in order of impact made". In 2007, the Professional Footballers' Association polled fans of all Football League clubs, as to "their No 1 player" as part of the "centenary celebrations of the players' union"; Wark was the choice of Ipswich fans. In the same year, Wark was one of four Ipswich Town players to be inducted into the club's Hall of Fame.

== Career statistics ==
=== Club ===
Appearances and goals by club, season and competition
Club	Season	Appearances				Goals
Club	Season	Football League	FA Cup	League Cup	Other	Goals
Ipswich Town	1974–75	3	2	0	0	0
Ipswich Town	1975–76	3	1	0	0	0
Ipswich Town	1976–77	33	3	2	0	10
Ipswich Town	1977–78	18	7	0	1	7
Ipswich Town	1978–79	42	5	1	7	9
Ipswich Town	1979–80	41	4	2	3	15
Ipswich Town	1980–81	40	7	5	12	36
Ipswich Town	1981–82	42	3	8	2	23
Ipswich Town	1982–83	42	3	2	2	23
Ipswich Town	1983–84	32	2	4	0	11
Ipswich Town	Total	266	37	24	27	134
Liverpool	1983–84	9	0	0	0	2
Liverpool	1984–85	40	7	3	12	27
Liverpool	1985–86	9	4	3	2	6
Liverpool	1986–87	11	2	3	1	7
Liverpool	1987–88	1	0	1	0	0
Liverpool	Total	70	13	10	15	42
Ipswich Town	1987–88	7	0	0	2	2
Ipswich Town	1988–89	41	1	3	4	13
Ipswich Town	1989–90	41	2	1	3	10
Ipswich Town	Total	89	3	4	9	25
Middlesbrough	1990–91	32	2	5	0	2
Ipswich Town	1991–92	37	5	1	3	3
Ipswich Town	1992–93	37	4	7	0	7
Ipswich Town	1993–94	38	5	3	0	4
Ipswich Town	1994–95	26	2	0	0	4
Ipswich Town	1995–96	14	2	1	2	2
Ipswich Town	1996–97	2	0	1	0	0
Ipswich Town	Total	154	18	13	5	20
Career total		611	73	56	56	223

=== International ===
Appearances and goals by national team and year
National team	Year	Apps	Goals
Scotland	1979	9	1
Scotland	1980	0	0
Scotland	1981	3	1
Scotland	1982	8	4
Scotland	1983	6	1
Scotland	1984	3	0
Total		29	7

Scores and results list Scotland's goal tally first, score column indicates score after each Wark goal.

List of international goals scored by John Wark
No.	Date	Venue	Opponent	Score	Result	Competition
1	26 May 1979	Wembley Stadium, London, England	England	1–0	1–3	1978–79 British Home Championship
2	25 March 1981	Hampden Park, Glasgow, Scotland	Northern Ireland	1–1	1–1	1982 FIFA World Cup qualification
3	28 April 1982	Windsor Park, Belfast, Northern Ireland	Northern Ireland	1–0	1–1	1981–82 British Home Championship
4	15 June 1982	Estadio La Rosaleda, Málaga, Spain	New Zealand	2–0	5–2	1982 FIFA World Cup
5	15 June 1982	Estadio La Rosaleda, Málaga, Spain	New Zealand	3–0	5–2	1982 FIFA World Cup
6	13 October 1982	Hampden Park, Glasgow, Scotland	East Germany	1–0	2–0	UEFA Euro 1984 qualification
7	30 March 1983	Hampden Park, Glasgow, Scotland	Switzerland	1–2	2–2	UEFA Euro 1984 qualification

== Honours ==
Ipswich Town

- Football League Second Division: 1991–92
- FA Cup: 1977–78
- UEFA Cup: 1980–81

Liverpool

- Football League First Division: 1983–84, 1985–86
- FA Charity Shield: 1986 (shared)
- Football League Cup runner-up: 1986–87

Individual

- PFA Players' Player of the Year: 1980–81
- UEFA Cup Top Scorer: 1980–81
- Bravo Award: 1981
- PFA Team of the Year: 1980–81 First Division
- Ipswich Town F.C. Player of the Year: 1988–89, 1989–90, 1991–92, 1993–94
- Ipswich Town Hall of Fame: Inducted 2007
- Balon d'Or 1981 9th place.
