= Simon Milton (footballer) =

English footballer (born 1963)

Personal information
- Date of birth: 23 August 1963 (age 63)
- Place of birth: Fulham, England
- Position: Midfielder

Team information
- Current team: Ipswich Town (academy co-ordinator)

Youth career
- Thetford Rovers

Senior career*
Years	Team	Apps	(Gls)
19??–1986	Thetford Rovers		
1986–1987	Bury Town		
1987–1998	Ipswich Town	280	(48)
1987	→ Exeter City (loan)	2	(3)
1988	→ Torquay United (loan)	4	(1)
1988	→ Braintree Town (loan)		
Total		286	(52)
- * Club domestic league appearances and goals

Simon Milton (born 23 August 1963) is an English former professional footballer and academy co-ordinator at Ipswich Town.

As a player, he was a midfielder from 1986 until 1997. During his career he made over 300 appearances for Ipswich Town. He also played for Bury Town, Exeter City, Torquay United and Braintree Town.

== Playing career ==
Although born in London, Milton moved to Thetford as a teenager and began his career as junior with local side Thetford Rovers. He had unsuccessful trials with Norwich City and Cambridge United and began his senior career with Thetford before joining another local non-league side, Bury Town. He played for Thetford in a friendly against Ipswich Town and impressed Ipswich manager Bobby Ferguson enough to earn a trial. Soon after, he was offered a professional contract, but then Ferguson was replaced by John Duncan. Duncan honoured the offer and Milton moved to Ipswich from Bury Town for a fee of £5,000.

He made his Ipswich debut on 28 December 1987 in a 4–2 defeat away to Swindon Town. He was loaned out to Devon sides Exeter City and Torquay United before becoming a regular with Ipswich. He was voted Ipswich's player of the year in 1996 and retired from playing professionally in 1997.

== Coaching career ==
In 1998, he joined the coaching staff at Ipswich Town's academy.

== Honours ==
Ipswich Town

- Football League Second Division: 1991–92

Individual

- Ipswich Town Player of the Year: 1995–96
- Ipswich Town Hall of Fame: Inducted 2016
