= Jason Dozzell =

English footballer

Personal information
- Full name: Jason Irvin Winans Dozzell
- Date of birth: 9 December 1967 (age 58)
- Place of birth: Ipswich, England
- Height: 6 ft 2 in (1.88 m)
- Position: Midfielder

Youth career
- Langham Lions
- Ipswich Town

Senior career*
| Years | Team | Apps | (Gls) |
| 1983–1993 | Ipswich Town | 340 | (53) |
| 1993–1997 | Tottenham Hotspur | 84 | (13) |
| 1997 | → Ipswich Town (loan) | 8 | (1) |
| 1997–1998 | Northampton Town | 22 | (4) |
| 1998–2002 | Colchester United | 91 | (9) |
| 2002 | Canvey Island | 4 | (0) |
| 2002 | Grays Athletic | 1 | (0) |
| Total | | 550 | (80) |

International career
| 1984 | England U17 | 3 | (1) |
| 1984 | England Youth | 2 | (1) |
| 1986–1989 | England U21 | 9 | (0) |

Managerial career
- 2003–2006: Ipswich Wanderers
- 2006–2007: Leiston
- * Club domestic league appearances and goals

Jason Irvin Winans Dozzell (born 9 December 1967) is an English football manager and former professional footballer.

As a player, he was a midfielder who notably played in the Premier League for Ipswich Town and Tottenham Hotspur. He also played in the Football League for Northampton Town and Colchester United before finishing his career with non-league sides Canvey Island and Grays Athletic. He was capped nine times at England U21 level. Dozzell holds the record for being the youngest goalscorer in England's top division after scoring for Ipswich Town against Coventry City in a First Division match on 4 February 1984 at the age of 16 years and 57 days.His son Andre also scored on his Ipswich debut aged 16.

Following retirement, he went on to manage several non-League football clubs, both in the Eastern Counties Football League — Ipswich Wanderers and Leiston.

== Early life ==
Born in Ipswich, Suffolk, in 1967, Dozzell attended the local Chantry High School. Dozzell is of American descent through his father, who left the family and returned to America, only seeing Dozzell again when he turned 21.

== Playing career ==
=== Ipswich Town ===
Playing football for the Langham Lions in the Colchester Youth League, Dozzell was noted as a "prolific schoolboy scorer", and was signed on schoolboy terms for Ipswich Town by Bobby Robson despite interest from West Ham United and Nottingham Forest. Selected for the senior squad by manager Bobby Ferguson, Dozzell made his debut for Ipswich Town in February 1984, coming on as a substitute against Coventry City. Ipswich won the match 3–1; Dozzell scored late in the second half, becoming the youngest player, at 16 years and 57 days, to score in the old English Football League First Division. He went on to make four further appearances in the 1983–84 season. The following season Dozzell made twenty appearances, five of them from the bench, and scored four goals. In the 1985–86 season he became a regular starter for Ipswich, scoring five goals in 51 games, although the club were relegated to the Football League Second Division. His 1986–87 season saw him play in every game, making 42 league and 11 cup appearances and scoring a single goal. He was also selected for the England under-21 team, for whom he played nine times without scoring.

In the 1988–89 season, Dozzell finished as the club's joint top-scorer (with John Wark and Dalian Atkinson), scoring 13 goals from 37 appearances. The following two seasons saw Dozzell as a regular starter for the team, with 18 goals from 88 appearances. His 16 goals in the 1991–92 season helped John Lyall's Ipswich win the league title and secure promotion to the newly formed Premier League. He featured regularly the following season, scoring nine goals in 52 games and helping the club stave off relegation in their first season back in the top tier of English football.

=== Tottenham Hotspur ===
In August 1993, Dozzell was signed by Tottenham Hotspur for £1.9 million. In his first season, he made 36 appearances and scored ten goals across all competitions. Dozzell suffered numerous injuries during his time at White Hart Lane, restricting the number of games in which he played. In the 1994–95 season, he managed just eight appearances in all competitions, scoring one goal. He made a total of 99 league and cup appearances and scored 14 goals over his four seasons at the club. Dozzell made a brief return to Portman Road in 1997, on loan for a month, and made ten appearances before leaving.

=== Northampton Town ===
He signed for Northampton Town in 1997. A season with The Cobblers saw him score four goals from 26 appearances and help the club to the play-off final at Wembley Stadium. This was followed by a move to newly promoted Colchester United, initially on a monthly contract, where Dozzell made more than 100 appearances and scored 11 goals over three seasons.

=== Non-League ===
Dozzell retired from professional football in 2001 as a result of persistent injuries, in particular an ongoing toe problem. However, he continued playing with non-league clubs; a brief spell with Canvey Island reunited him with former Colchester and Ipswich player Neil Gregory. Canvey Island released him and he moved on to an even shorter stay with Grays Athletic, who signed him alongside Carl Leaburn. This was followed by a move back to Ipswich and into management.

== Managerial career ==
Dozzell took his first step into management with Eastern Counties Football League club Ipswich Wanderers in 2003. In his role as player-manager, he moved to play in defence and secured an eighth-place finish in the league during his first season with the club. The following season, he led them to the league title and promotion to the Eastern Counties League Premier Division. The 2005–06 season saw Dozzell lead the newly promoted club to seventh in the league, but despite ending the season with a record tally of points, he left the Wanderers, citing off-pitch issues at the club.

Dozzell went on to manage Leiston, but he left in November 2007.

== Personal life ==
He is the father of professional footballer Andre Dozzell. He has supported local charities, including acting as a patron for "Operation Santa Claus", run in conjunction with radio station SGR-FM. He played for a "Town Legends" side against a Soccer AM team in 2005 to raise money for the Academy, where his son, Andre, was in the under-10s team. In 2007, he was found guilty of driving with excess alcohol and was banned for three years.

== Honours ==
Ipswich Town

- Football League Second Division: 1991–92

Individual

- Ipswich Town Hall of Fame: Inducted 2015
