= 1995–96 Ipswich Town F.C. season =

Ipswich Town
1995–96 season
- Chairman: David Sheepshanks
- Manager: George Burley
- Stadium: Portman Road
- First Division: 7th
- FA Cup: Fifth round
- League Cup: Second round
- Anglo-Italian Cup: Regional semi-finals
- Top goalscorer: League: Ian Marshall (19); All: Ian Marshall / Alex Mathie (19)
- Highest home attendance: 20,335 (vs Norwich City, 14 Apr 1996, First Division)
- Lowest home attendance: 5,831 (vs Port Vale, 23 Jan 1996, Anglo-Italian Cup)
- Average home league attendance: 12,604

During the 1995–96 English football season, Ipswich Town competed in the Football League First Division.

== Season summary ==
Having served on the board of directors since 1986, David Sheepshanks was appointed as club chairman in August 1995. In George Burley's first season in charge, Ipswich failed to get back in Premier League at the first attempt, falling one place short of the First Division play-off zone, after failing to beat Millwall in the last game of the season. They were the leading goalscorers in the top four divisions with 79 goals.

Ipswich's biggest defeat of the season was a 5-1 home defeat to Charlton Athletic. Ipswich were 1-0 ahead at half-time but goalkeeper Craig Forrest got injured in the second half when Charlton equalised and was replaced by striker Neil Gregory in goal who went on to concede four. Later in the season, future England international Richard Wright replaced Forrest as goalkeeper for the game against Crystal Palace in January and remained as number one for the rest of the season.

Ipswich knocked Premier League Champions Blackburn Rovers out of the FA Cup Third Round in a replay. Ipswich also reached the semi-final of the Anglo-Italian Cup, losing to Port Vale.

== First-team squad ==
Note: Flags indicate national team as defined under FIFA eligibility rules; some limited exceptions apply. Players may hold more than one non-FIFA nationality.

No.	Pos.	Nation	Player
—	GK	ENG	Richard Wright
—	GK	CAN	Craig Forrest
—	DF	ENG	Tony Mowbray
—	DF	ENG	Chris Swailes
—	DF	ENG	Neil Thompson
—	DF	NED	Gus Uhlenbeek
—	DF	DEN	Claus Thomsen
—	DF	ARG	Mauricio Taricco
—	MF	ENG	Adam Tanner
—	MF	ENG	Richard Appleby
—	MF	ENG	Lee Durrant
—	MF	ENG	Paul Mason

No.	Pos.	Nation	Player
—	MF	ENG	Simon Milton
—	MF	ENG	Steve Sedgley
—	MF	ENG	Stuart Slater
—	MF	ENG	Mick Stockwell
—	MF	ENG	Tony Vaughan
—	MF	WAL	Geraint Williams
—	MF	SCO	John Wark
—	MF	NZL	Lee Norfolk
—	FW	ENG	Ian Marshall
—	FW	ENG	James Scowcroft
—	FW	SCO	Alex Mathie
—	FW	ZAM	Neil Gregory

=== Left club during season ===
Note: Flags indicate national team as defined under FIFA eligibility rules; some limited exceptions apply. Players may hold more than one non-FIFA nationality.

No.	Pos.	Nation	Player
—	GK	ENG	Fred Barber (loan return to Luton Town)
—	GK	AUS	Andy Petterson (loan return to Charlton Athletic)
—	DF	CAN	Frank Yallop (to Tampa Bay Mutiny)

No.	Pos.	Nation	Player
—	DF	ENG	David Linighan (to Blackpool)
—	DF	ENG	Steve Palmer (to Watford)
—	FW	ENG	Lee Chapman (to Swansea City)

== Competitions ==
=== Football League First Division ===
==== League table ====
Pos	Team	Pld	W	D	L	GF	GA	GD	Pts	Qualification or relegation
5	Leicester City (O, P)	46	19	14	13	66	60	+6	71	Qualification for the First Division play-offs
6	Charlton Athletic	46	17	20	9	57	45	+12	71	Qualification for the First Division play-offs
7	Ipswich Town	46	19	12	15	79	69	+10	69	
8	Huddersfield Town	46	17	12	17	61	58	+3	63	
9	Sheffield United	46	16	14	16	57	54	+3	62	

Rules for classification: 1) Points; 2) Goals scored; 3) Goal difference
(O) Play-off winners; (P) Promoted

==== Legend ====
Win	Draw	Loss

Ipswich Town's score comes first

==== Matches ====
Date	Opponent	Venue	Result	Attendance	Scorers
12 August 1995	Birmingham City	A	1–3	18,910	Marshall
19 August 1995	Crystal Palace	H	1–0	12,681	Mathie
26 August 1995	West Bromwich Albion	A	0–0	14,470	
30 August 1995	Stoke City	H	4–1	10,848	Mathie (2), Slater (2)
2 September 1995	Sunderland	H	3–0	12,390	Mathie (3)
9 September 1995	Huddersfield Town	A	1–2	12,057	Sedgley
12 September 1995	Oldham Athletic	A	1–1	5,622	Marshall
16 September 1995	Watford	H	4–2	11,441	Uhlenbeek, Thomsen, Gregory (2)
23 September 1995	Charlton Athletic	H	1–5	12,815	Thomsen
30 September 1995	Sheffield United	A	2–2	12,557	Marshall (2)
7 October 1995	Wolverhampton Wanderers	H	1–2	15,335	Sedgley
14 October 1995	Derby County	A	1–1	13,034	Sedgley
22 October 1995	Luton Town	H	0–1	9,123	
28 October 1995	Reading	A	4–1	10,281	Williams, Uhlenbeek, Mathie, Mason
4 November 1995	Grimsby Town	H	2–2	10,250	Mason (2)
11 November 1995	Millwall	A	1–2	11,360	Mason
19 November 1995	Norwich City	A	1–2	17,862	Wark
22 November 1995	Southend United	H	1–1	9,757	Uhlenbeek
25 November 1995	Portsmouth	H	3–2	10,286	Thompson, Marshall, Milton
3 December 1995	Wolverhampton Wanderers	A	2–2	20,867	Mowbray, Marshall
9 December 1995	Charlton Athletic	A	2–0	10,316	Marshall, Stockwell
16 December 1995	Sheffield United	H	1–1	9,630	Tuttle (own goal)
22 December 1995	Barnsley	H	2–2	11,791	Mathie, Marshall
1 January 1996	Port Vale	H	5–1	9,926	Sedgley, Mathie (2), Marshall, Milton
13 January 1996	Crystal Palace	A	1–1	14,097	Mathie
20 January 1996	Birmingham City	H	2–0	12,540	Milton (2)
3 February 1996	West Bromwich Albion	H	2–1	10,798	Mowbray, Marshall
10 February 1996	Stoke City	A	1–3	12,239	Scowcroft
20 February 1996	Sunderland	A	0–1	14,052	
24 February 1996	Watford	A	3–2	11,872	Uhlenbeek, Mathie (2)
3 March 1996	Leicester City	H	4–2	9,817	Wark, Marshall (2), Milton
9 March 1996	Barnsley	A	3–3	7,705	Marshall (2), Milton
13 March 1996	Leicester City	A	2–0	17,783	Mathie, Marshall
16 March 1996	Tranmere Rovers	H	1–2	11,759	Marshall
19 March 1996	Oldham Athletic	H	2–1	9,674	Mason (2)
23 March 1996	Port Vale	A	1–2	7,277	Marshall
30 March 1996	Luton Town	A	2–1	9,151	Milton (2)
2 April 1996	Derby County	H	1–0	16,210	Vaughan
6 April 1996	Reading	H	1–2	17,328	Mathie
8 April 1996	Grimsby Town	A	1–3	5,904	Scowcroft
14 April 1996	Norwich City	H	2–1	20,335	Marshall, Ullathorne (own goal)
17 April 1996	Tranmere Rovers	A	2–5	6,008	Mason, Marshall
20 April 1996	Southend United	A	1–2	8,363	Milton
27 April 1996	Portsmouth	A	1–0	12,954	Mathie
1 May 1996	Huddersfield Town	H	2–1	17,473	Mathie (2)
5 May 1996	Millwall	H	0–0	17,290	

=== FA Cup ===
Round	Date	Opponent	Venue	Result	Attendance	Goalscorers
R3	6 January 1996	Blackburn Rovers	H	0–0	21,236	
R3R	16 January 1996	Blackburn Rovers	A	1–0	19,606	Mason
R4	13 February 1996	Walsall	H	1–0	18,489	Mason
R5	17 February 1996	Aston Villa	H	1–3	20,748	Mason

=== League Cup ===
Round	Date	Opponent	Venue	Result	Attendance	Goalscorers
R2 First Leg	19 September 1995	Stockport County	A	1–1	4,865	Sedgley
R2 Second Leg	3 October 1995	Stockport County	H	1–2 (lost 2–3 on agg)	8,250	Thomsen

=== Anglo-Italian Cup ===
Round	Date	Opponent	Venue	Result	Attendance	Goalscorers
Group B	5 September 1995	Reggio Audace	H	2–1	9,525	Tanner, Mathie
Group B	11 October 1995	Brescia	A	2–2	1,300	Mason, Sedgley
Group B	8 November 1995	Foggia	A	1–0	2,000	Mason
Group B	13 December 1995	Salerno	H	2–0	6,429	Mowbray, Gregory
SF	23 January 1996	Port Vale	H	2–4	5,831	Gregory, Mason

== Transfers ==
=== Transfers in ===
Date	Pos	Name	From	Fee	Ref
11 August 1995	DF	(Netherlands) Gus Uhlenbeek	(Netherlands) TOP Oss	£100,000	
6 October 1995	DF	(England) Tony Mowbray	(Scotland) Celtic	£300,000	
12 December 1995	MF	(England) Richard Appleby	(England) Newcastle United	Free transfer	

=== Loans in ===
Date from	Pos	Name	From	Date until	Ref
10 November 1995	GK	(England) Fred Barber	(England) Luton Town	14 December 1995	
26 December 1995	GK	(Australia) Andy Petterson	(England) Charlton Athletic	18 January 1996	

=== Transfers out ===
Date	Pos	Name	To	Fee	Ref
1 July 1995	MF	(Uruguay) Adrián Paz	Free agent	Released	
1 July 1995	GK	(England) Clive Baker	Retired		
1 July 1995	MF	(England) Matt Weston	Free agent	Released	
1 July 1995	MF	(Scotland) Graham Connell	(Scotland) Clydebank	Free transfer	
1 July 1995	FW	(Scotland) David Pirie	Free agent	Released	
4 July 1995	MF	(England) Gavin Johnson	(England) Luton Town	Free transfer	
4 July 1995	MF	(England) David Gregory	(England) Peterborough United	Free transfer	
6 July 1995	GK	(England) Phil Morgan	(England) Stoke City	Free transfer	
23 August 1995	MF	(Bulgaria) Boncho Genchev	(England) Luton Town	Free transfer	
28 September 1995	DF	(England) Steve Palmer	(England) Watford	£135,000	
26 January 1996	DF	(England) David Linighan	(England) Blackpool	£90,000	
7 February 1996	DF	(Canada) Frank Yallop	(United States) Tampa Bay Mutiny	Undisclosed	
28 March 1996	FW	(England) Lee Chapman	(Wales) Swansea City	Free transfer	

=== Loans out ===
Date from	Pos	Name	From	Date until	Ref
17 November 1995	DF	(England) David Linighan	(England) Blackpool	26 January 1996	
3 November 1995	DF	(Canada) Frank Yallop	(England) Blackpool	3 December 1995	
11 January 1996	FW	(England) Lee Chapman	(England) Leeds United	27 March 1996	

== Awards ==
=== Player awards ===
Award	Player
Player of the Year	(England) Simon Milton
