= 1997–98 Ipswich Town F.C. season =

Ipswich Town
1997–98 season
- Chairman: David Sheepshanks
- Manager: George Burley
- Stadium: Portman Road
- First Division: 5th
- FA Cup: Fourth round
- League Cup: Quarter-finals
- Play-offs: Semi-finals
- Top goalscorer: League: David Johnson (20); All: David Johnson (22)
- Highest home attendance: 22,088 (vs Chelsea, 7 Jan 1998, League Cup)
- Lowest home attendance: 8,031 (vs Torquay United, 16 Sep 1997, League Cup)
- Average home league attendance: 14,972

During the 1997–98 English football season, Ipswich Town competed in the Football League First Division.

== Season summary ==
For the second season running, Ipswich reached the playoffs, having won 16 of their last 20 games, but lost to Charlton Athletic who went on to be promoted.

== First-team squad ==
Note: Flags indicate national team as defined under FIFA eligibility rules; some limited exceptions apply. Players may hold more than one non-FIFA nationality.

No.	Pos.	Nation	Player
—	GK	(England) ENG	Richard Wright
—	GK	(England) ENG	Lee Bracey
—	DF	(England) ENG	Tony Mowbray
—	DF	(England) ENG	Jamie Clapham
—	DF	(England) ENG	Mark Venus
—	DF	(England) ENG	Jason Cundy
—	DF	(Netherlands) NED	Gus Uhlenbeek
—	DF	(Argentina) ARG	Mauricio Taricco
—	MF	(Republic of Ireland) IRL	Matt Holland
—	MF	(England) ENG	Kieron Dyer
—	MF	(Northern Ireland) NIR	Danny Sonner

No.	Pos.	Nation	Player
—	MF	(England) ENG	Paul Mason
—	MF	(England) ENG	Simon Milton
—	MF	(England) ENG	Mick Stockwell
—	MF	(England) ENG	Adam Tanner
—	MF	(Wales) WAL	Geraint Williams
—	MF	(Netherlands) NED	Bobby Petta
—	FW	(England) ENG	Richard Naylor
—	FW	(England) ENG	James Scowcroft
—	FW	(Scotland) SCO	Alex Mathie
—	FW	(England) ENG	David Johnson

=== Left club during season ===
Note: Flags indicate national team as defined under FIFA eligibility rules; some limited exceptions apply. Players may hold more than one non-FIFA nationality.

No.	Pos.	Nation	Player
—	DF	(England) ENG	Chris Swailes (to Bury)
—	DF	(Wales) WAL	Andy Legg (on loan from Birmingham City)
—	FW	(England) ENG	David Whyte (released)
—	MF	(England) ENG	Jason Dozzell (on loan from Tottenham Hotspur)

No.	Pos.	Nation	Player
—	FW	(England) ENG	Mark Stein (on loan from Chelsea)
—	DF	(England) ENG	David Kerslake (to Swindon Town)
—	FW	(Zambia) ZAM	Neil Gregory (to Colchester United)

=== Reserve squad ===
Note: Flags indicate national team as defined under FIFA eligibility rules; some limited exceptions apply. Players may hold more than one non-FIFA nationality.

No.	Pos.	Nation	Player
—	DF	(England) ENG	Wayne Brown
—	DF	(England) ENG	David Theobald
—	MF	(England) ENG	Chris Keeble

No.	Pos.	Nation	Player
—	MF	(England) ENG	John Kennedy
—	MF	(Scotland) SCO	Stuart Niven
—	FW	(England) ENG	Neil Midgley

== Competitions ==
=== Football League First Division ===
==== League table ====
Pos	Team	Pld	W	D	L	GF	GA	GD	Pts	Qualification or relegation
3	Sunderland	46	26	12	8	86	50	+36	90	Qualification for the First Division play-offs
4	Charlton Athletic (O, P)	46	26	10	10	80	49	+31	88	Qualification for the First Division play-offs
5	Ipswich Town	46	23	14	9	77	43	+34	83	Qualification for the First Division play-offs
6	Sheffield United	46	19	17	10	69	54	+15	74	Qualification for the First Division play-offs
7	Birmingham City	46	19	17	10	60	35	+25	74	

Source: Statto.com
Rules for classification: 1) Points; 2) Goals scored; 3) Goal difference
(O) Play-off winners; (P) Promoted

==== Results summary ====
Overall								Home						Away					
Pld	W	D	L	GF	GA	GD	Pts	W	D	L	GF	GA	GD	W	D	L	GF	GA	GD
46	26	14	6	81	39	+42	92	16	5	2	50	17	+33	10	9	4	31	22	+9

Source: Statto

==== Legend ====
Win	Draw	Loss

Ipswich Town's score comes first

==== Matches ====
Date	Opponent	Venue	Result	Attendance	Scorers
9 August 1997	Queens Park Rangers	A	0–0	17,614	
23 August 1997	Bradford City	A	1–2	13,913	Dyer
30 August 1997	West Bromwich Albion	H	1–1	13,512	Stein
2 September 1997	Swindon Town	H	2–1	11,394	Venus, Sonner
13 September 1997	Huddersfield Town	A	2–2	9,313	Edmondson (o.g), Dyer
20 September 1997	Stoke City	H	2–3	11,219	Scowcroft, Holland
26 September 1997	Norwich City	A	1–2	18,911	Stein
4 October 1997	Manchester City	H	1–0	14,587	Mathie
18 October 1997	Oxford United	A	0–1	7,594	
21 October 1997	Crewe Alexandra	A	0–0	4,730	
25 October 1997	Bury	H	2–0	10,452	Tanner (pen), Dozzell
28 October 1997	Birmingham City	A	1–1	16,778	Holland
1 November 1997	Charlton Athletic	A	0–3	12,606	
4 November 1997	Stockport County	H	0–2	8,828	
9 November 1997	Sheffield United	H	2–2	9,687	Legg, Gregory
15 November 1997	Wolverhampton Wanderers	A	1–1	21,937	Johnson
22 November 1997	Reading	A	4–0	9,400	Holland, Johnson, Scowcroft, Naylor
29 November 1997	Nottingham Forest	H	0–1	17,725	
2 December 1997	Middlesbrough	H	1–1	13,865	Johnson
6 December 1997	Tranmere Rovers	A	1–1	5,720	Johnson
13 December 1997	Portsmouth	H	2–0	11,759	Cundy, Johnson
20 December 1997	Port Vale	A	3–1	5,784	Mathie (2), Johnson
26 December 1997	Birmingham City	H	0–1	17,510	
28 December 1997	Swindon Town	A	2–0	11,639	Johnson (pen), Petta
10 January 1998	Queens Park Rangers	H	0–0	12,709	
17 January 1998	Middlesbrough	A	1–1	30,081	Johnson
27 January 1998	West Bromwich Albion	A	3–2	12,402	Holland, Scowcroft, Cundy
31 January 1998	Bradford City	H	2–1	11,855	Mathie (2)
7 February 1998	Stoke City	A	1–1	11,416	Holland
14 February 1998	Huddersfield Town	H	5–1	10,597	Holland, Johnson (2), Mathie, Naylor
18 February 1998	Manchester City	A	2–1	27,156	Mathie, Dyer
21 February 1998	Norwich City	H	5–0	21,858	Mathie (3), Petta (2)
24 February 1998	Oxford United	H	5–2	11,927	Mathie, Johnson (3), Holland
28 February 1998	Sunderland	A	2–2	34,501	Petta, Dyer
3 March 1998	Sheffield United	A	1–0	14,120	Holland
7 March 1998	Charlton Athletic	H	3–1	19,827	Stockwell, Cundy, Johnson
14 March 1998	Stockport County	A	1–0	8,939	Johnson
21 March 1998	Wolverhampton Wanderers	H	3–0	21,546	Johnson, Holland, Scowcroft
28 March 1998	Reading	H	1–0	18,952	Scowcroft
5 April 1998	Nottingham Forest	A	1–2	22,292	Scowcroft
11 April 1998	Tranmere Rovers	H	0–0	18,032	
13 April 1998	Portsmouth	A	1–0	15,040	Johnson
18 April 1998	Port Vale	H	5–1	16,212	Johnson (2), Petta (2), Mathie
25 April 1998	Bury	A	1–0	7,830	Stockwell
28 April 1998	Sunderland	H	2–0	21,249	Holland, Mathie
3 May 1998	Crewe Alexandra	H	3–2	19,070	Johnson, Stockwell, Mathie

=== First Division play-offs ===
Round	Date	Opponent	Venue	Result	Attendance	Goalscorers
SF First Leg	10 May 1998	Charlton Athletic	H	0–1	21,681	
SF Second Leg	13 May 1998	Charlton Athletic	A	0–1	15,585	

=== FA Cup ===
Round	Date	Opponent	Venue	Result	Attendance	Goalscorers
R3	3 January 1998	Bristol Rovers	A	1–1		Stockwell
R3 Replay	13 January 1998	Bristol Rovers	H	1–0		Johnson
R4	24 January 1998	Sheffield United	H	1–1		Johnson
R4 Replay	3 February 1998	Sheffield United	A	0–1		

=== League Cup ===
Round	Date	Opponent	Venue	Result	Attendance	Goalscorers
R1 First Leg	13 August 1997	Charlton Athletic	A	1–0	6,598	Venus
R1 Second Leg	26 August 1997	Charlton Athletic	H	3–1 (won 4–1 on agg)	10,989	Stein, Brown (o.g), Scowcroft
R2 First Leg	16 September 1997	Torquay United	H	1–1	8,031	Stockwell
R2 Second Leg	23 September 1997	Torquay United	A	3–0 (won 4–1 on agg)	3,598	Holland (2), Dyer
R3	14 October 1997	Manchester United	H	2–0	22,173	Mathie, Taricco
R4	18 November 1997	Oxford United	A	2–1	5,723	Dozzell, Mowbray
QF	7 January 1998	Chelsea	H	2–2 (lost 4–1 on penalties)	22,088	Taricco, Mathie

== Transfers ==
=== Transfers in ===
Date	Pos	Name	From	Fee	Ref
1 August 1997	MF	(Republic of Ireland) Matt Holland	(England) Bournemouth	£800,000	
1 August 1997	DF	(England) Mark Venus	(England) Wolverhampton Wanderers	£150,000	
1 August 1997	GK	(England) Lee Bracey	(England) Bury	£40,000	
14 August 1997	DF	(England) David Kerslake	(England) Tottenham Hotspur	Free transfer	
31 October 1997	FW	(England) David Whyte	(England) Reading	Free transfer	
13 November 1997	FW	(England) David Johnson	(England) Bury	£1,100,000	
12 March 1998	DF	(England) Jamie Clapham	(England) Tottenham Hotspur	£300,000	

=== Loans in ===
Date from	Pos	Name	From	Date until	Ref
22 August 1997	FW	(England) Mark Stein	(England) Chelsea	22 October 1997	
2 October 1997	MF	(England) Jason Dozzell	(England) Tottenham Hotspur	20 November 1997	
3 November 1997	DF	(Wales) Andy Legg	(England) Birmingham City	3 December 1997	
9 January 1998	DF	(England) Jamie Clapham	(England) Tottenham Hotspur	12 March 1998	

=== Transfers out ===
Date	Pos	Name	To	Fee	Ref
31 May 1997	MF	(Scotland) John Wark	Retired		
1 July 1997	MF	(New Zealand) Lee Norfolk	(New Zealand) North Shore United	Free transfer	
1 July 1997	DF	(England) Kevin Ellis	(England) King's Lynn Town	Free transfer	
1 July 1997	MF	(England) Steve Sedgley	(England) Wolverhampton Wanderers	£500,000	
21 July 1997	GK	(Canada) Craig Forrest	(England) West Ham United	£500,000	
1 August 1997	DF	(England) Tony Vaughan	(England) Manchester City	£1,350,000	
13 November 1997	DF	(England) Chris Swailes	(England) Bury	£200,000	
30 November 1997	FW	(England) David Whyte	Free agent	Released	
9 March 1998	DF	(England) David Kerslake	(England) Swindon Town	Free transfer	
26 March 1998	FW	(Zambia) Neil Gregory	(England) Colchester United	£50,000	

=== Loans out ===
Date from	Pos	Name	From	Date until	Ref
17 October 1997	DF	(England) Wayne Brown	(England) Colchester United	8 November 1997	
26 November 1997	FW	(Zambia) Neil Gregory	(England) Peterborough United	26 December 1997	
11 December 1997	DF	(England) David Kerslake	(England) Wycombe Wanderers	9 March 1998	
1 January 1998	FW	(Zambia) Neil Gregory	(England) Colchester United	2 March 1998	
6 March 1998	MF	(England) John Kennedy	(England) Morecambe	31 May 1998	

== Awards ==
=== Player awards ===
Award	Player	Ref
Player of the Year	(Republic of Ireland) Matt Holland	

=== PFA First Division Team of the Year ===
Player	Ref
(England) Kieron Dyer	
(Argentina) Mauricio Taricco	
