= 2000–01 PFC Cherno More Varna season =

Cherno More
2000–01 season
- Chairman: Krasen Kralev
- Manager: Bozhil Kolev
- A Group: 10th
- Bulgarian Cup: Third round (knocked out by Spartak Pleven)
- Top goalscorer: Mario Metushev (5)
- Biggest win: 3–0 (vs Chernomorets, 5 August 2000)
- Biggest defeat: 6–0 (vs Levski, 19 May 2001)
Home colours	Away colours

This page covers all relevant details regarding PFC Cherno More Varna for all official competitions inside the 2000–01 season. These are A Group and Bulgarian Cup.

== Transfers ==
=== Summer transfer window ===
In:

No.	Pos.	Nation	Player
—	DF	BUL	Borislav Pavlov (from Velbazhd)
—	MF	BUL	Georgi Iliev (loan return from Svetkavitsa)
—	MF	BUL	Kristiyan Dobrev (from Dobrudzha)
—	FW	BUL	Mario Metushev (from Velbazhd)

Out:

No.	Pos.	Nation	Player
—	DF	BUL	Iliyan Pamukov (to Marek)
—	DF	BUL	Krasimir Vlahov (to Spartak Varna)
—	MF	BUL	Viktor Mihaylov (to Botev Vratsa)
—	FW	BUL	Hristo Marashliev (to Spartak Varna)
—	FW	BUL	Viktor Genchev (to Devnya)

=== Winter transfer window ===
In:

No.	Pos.	Nation	Player
—	GK	BUL	Tihomir Todorov (from Spartak Varna)
—	DF	YUG	Miroslav Milošević (from (North Macedonia) Pelister)
—	DF	YUG	Mark Šekularac (Free agent)
—	FW	ROU	Costel Ilie (Free agent)

Out:

No.	Pos.	Nation	Player
—	GK	BUL	Kaloyan Chakarov (to (Italy) Sangiustese)
—	DF	BUL	Slaveyko Dimitrov (to Botev Vratsa)
—	MF	BUL	Ivo Dimov (released)
—	FW	BUL	Vesko Petkov (retired)

== Squad ==
=== League Statistics ===
Pos.	Nat.	Name	App	Goals
GK	(Bulgaria)	Nedelcho Dobrev	?	0
GK	(Bulgaria)	Tihomir Todorov	?	0
GK	(Bulgaria)	Galin Milkov	1	0
DF	(Bulgaria)	Kaloyan Filatov	?	0
DF	(Bulgaria)	Filip Ilkov	?	0
DF	(Bulgaria)	Zdravko Zdravkov	?	0
DF	(Federal Republic of Yugoslavia)	Miroslav Milošević	?	0
DF	(Bulgaria)	Zdravko Stankov	21	0
DF	(Federal Republic of Yugoslavia)	Mark Šekularac	?	0
DF	(Bulgaria)	Ventsislav Marinov	?	0
DF	(Bulgaria)	Borislav Pavlov	?	0
DF	(Bulgaria)	Boyko Kamenov	?	0
MF	(Bulgaria)	Georgi Iliev	18	2
MF	(Bulgaria)	Daniel Kalchev	?	1
MF	(Bulgaria)	Ivo Mihaylov	?	1
MF	(Bulgaria)	Yavor Georgiev	?	0
MF	(Bulgaria)	Lyudmil Kirov	?	0
MF	(Bulgaria)	Kristiyan Dobrev	18	0
MF	(Bulgaria)	Bozhidar Kolev	?	0
MF	(Bulgaria)	Stanislav Stoyanov	22	3
MF	(Bulgaria)	Milen Petkov	?	1
FW	(Bulgaria)	Mario Metushev	24	5
FW	(Romania)	Costel Ilie	?	1
FW	(Bulgaria)	Filip Teofoolu	11	1

Players, who left the club during a season

Pos.	Nat.	Name	App	Goals
GK	(Bulgaria)	Kaloyan Chakarov	12	0
DF	(Bulgaria)	Slaveyko Dimitrov	3	0
MF	(Bulgaria)	Ivo Dimov	7	0
FW	(Bulgaria)	Vesko Petkov	9	4

== Matches ==
=== A Group ===
5 August 2000 Round 1	Cherno More	3 – 0	Chernomorets Burgas	Varna
18:00 EEST	V. Petkov 13', 60'; Kurtev 30' (o.g.)			Stadium: Ticha

12 August 2000 Round 2	Hebar Pazardzhik	2 – 0	Cherno More	Pazardzhik
18:00 EEST	Tunchev 54'; Stoyanov 88'			Stadium: Georgi Benkovski; Attendance: 2,000; Referee: Stefan Spasov (Pernik)

19 August 2000 Round 3	Cherno More	0 – 0	Spartak Varna	Varna
18:00 EEST				Stadium: Ticha; Attendance: 10,000

26 August 2000 Round 4	Minyor Pernik	1 – 1	Cherno More	Pernik
18:00 EEST	Petrović 78' (pen.)		Metushev 16'	Stadium: Minyor

9 September 2000 Round 5	Cherno More	1 – 4	CSKA Sofia	Varna
17:00 EEST	Stoyanov 37'	report	Yanev 20'; Vidolov 24'; Deyanov 78'; Sv. Petrov 90'	Stadium: Ticha

16 September 2000 Round 6	Lokomotiv Sofia	3 – 0	Cherno More	Sofia
17:30 EEST	Dafchev 12'; Gargorov 37'; Mukansi 52'			Stadium: Lokomotiv

1 October 2000 Round 7	Cherno More	0 – 0	Neftochimic Burgas	Varna
17:00 EEST				Stadium: Ticha

14 October 2000 Round 8	Botev Plovdiv	1 – 0	Cherno More	Plovdiv
16:00 EEST	Kr. Dimitrov 69' (pen.)			Stadium: Hristo Botev; Referee: Nikolay Yordanov (Sofia)

21 October 2000 Round 9	Cherno More	3 – 2	Lovech	Varna
16:00 EEST	V. Petkov 35', 60'; Iliev 51'		Bornosuzov 23'; Todorov 45' (pen.)	Stadium: Ticha; Referee: Ivan Dobrinov (Sofia)

28 October 2000 Round 10	Cherno More	1 – 3	Velbazhd Kyustendil	Varna
16:00 EEST	Teofoolu 89' (pen.)		Stoynev 67'; Trajanov 82'; Velichkov 84'	Stadium: Ticha; Referee: Svetozar Marinov (Ruse)

11 November 2000 Round 11	Beroe Stara Zagora	1 – 0	Cherno More	Stara Zagora
14:30 EEST	Gerasimov 87' (pen.)			Stadium: Beroe; Referee: Georgi Videlov (Burgas)

18 November 2000 Round 12	Cherno More	0 – 3	Levski Sofia	Varna
14:30 EEST		report	Atanasov 45'; Dragić 53'; G. Ivanov 62'	Attendance: 10,000; Referee: Kancho Dimitrov (Sofia)

25 November 2000 Round 13	Slavia Sofia	3 – 0	Cherno More	Sofia
14:30 EEST	Dzhorov 26'; G. Georgiev 64'; Shopov 90'			Stadium: Slavia; Referee: Stefan Gospodinov (Stara Zagora)

3 March 2001 Round 14	Chernomorets Burgas	0 – 1	Cherno More	Burgas
14:30 EEST			Metushev 86'	Stadium: Chernomorets

10 March 2001 Round 17	Cherno More	2 – 1	Hebar Pazardzhik	Varna
15:00 EEST	Metushev 49', 76'		Bogdanov 75'	Stadium: Ticha; Attendance: 5,000

14 March 2001 Round 16	Spartak Varna	0 – 0	Cherno More	Varna
16:00 EEST				Stadium: Spartak

17 March 2001 Round 17	Cherno More	1 – 0	Minyor Pernik	Varna
15:00 EEST	Mihaylov 45'	report		Stadium: Ticha; Attendance: 1,500; Referee: Stefan Gospodinov (Stara Zagora)

31 March 2001 Round 18	CSKA Sofia	1 – 0	Cherno More	Sofia
17:30 EEST	Vidolov 18'	report		Stadium: Balgarska Armia; Attendance: 4,000; Referee: Hristo Ristoskov (Sandanski)

7 April 2001 Round 19	Cherno More	2 – 2	Lokomotiv Sofia	Varna
16:00 EEST	Stoyanov 42' (pen.); Kalchev 77'	report	Donev 24', 45'	Stadium: Ticha; Attendance: 3,500; Referee: Kamen Aleksiev (Veliko Tarnovo)

14 April 2001 Round 20	Neftochimic Burgas	4 – 0	Cherno More	Burgas
20:00 EEST	Sakaliev 43', 55'; S. Dimitrov 62'; Spasov 79'	report		Stadium: Lazur; Attendance: 4,000; Referee: Anton Getsov

21 April 2001 Round 21	Cherno More	3 – 2	Botev Plovdiv	Varna
17:30 EEST	Iliev 23'; Metushev 66'; M. Petkov 83'	report	Kikov 16'; Kamburov 73'	Stadium: Ticha; Attendance: 1,500; Referee: Georgi Narlev (Silistra)

28 April 2001 Round 22	Lovech	5 – 0	Cherno More	Lovech
19:00 EEST	Răchită 2'; Yurukov 23'; Yovov 50', 70'; K. Nikolov 82'			Referee: Dimitar Kostov (Burgas)

5 May 2001 Round 23	Velbazhd Kyustendil	3 – 0	Cherno More	Kyustendil
17:30 EEST	Yordanov 7'; Hristev 11'; Pl. Petrov 54'	report		Stadium: Osogovo; Attendance: 1,000; Referee: Tsvetan Georgiev (Sofia)

12 May 2001 Round 24	Cherno More	1 – 2	Beroe Stara Zagora	Varna
17:30 EEST	Stoyanov 34' (pen.)		Mindev 42'; Bozhilov 65'	Stadium: Ticha

19 May 2001 Round 25	Levski Sofia	6 – 0	Cherno More	Sofia
18:00 EEST	G. Ivanov 49' (pen.); Mihtarski 62'; Radimov 64'; Telkiyski 66', 90'; Stoilov 87'	report		Stadium: Georgi Asparuhov; Attendance: 22,000; Referee: Dimitar Dimitrov (Sofia)

27 May 2001 Round 26	Cherno More	1 – 0	Slavia Sofia	Varna
18:00 EEST	Ilie 39'			Stadium: Ticha

==== League table ====
Pos	Team	Pld	W	D	L	GF	GA	GD	Pts	Qualification or relegation
8	Lokomotiv Sofia	26	9	6	11	37	37	0	33	
9	Hebar Pazardzhik	26	7	5	14	38	55	−17	26	Relegation to V Group
10	Cherno More	26	7	5	14	20	49	−29	26	
11	Chernomorets Burgas	26	6	4	16	22	48	−26	22	
12	Beroe (O)	26	6	4	16	21	47	−26	22	Qualification for relegation play-off

Source: A PFG (in Bulgarian) and rsssf.com
Rules for classification: 1st points; 2nd head-to-head points; 3rd head-to-head goal difference; 4th head-to-head goals scored; 5th head-to-head away goals scored; 6th season goal difference; 7th season goals scored; 8th "sportsmanship" (R & Y cards); 9th draw
(O) Play-off winners

==== Results summary ====
Overall								Home						Away					
Pld	W	D	L	GF	GA	GD	Pts	W	D	L	GF	GA	GD	W	D	L	GF	GA	GD
26	7	5	14	20	49	−29	26	6	3	4	18	19	−1	1	2	10	2	30	−28

==== League performance ====
Round	1	2	3	4	5	6	7	8	9	10	11	12	13	14	15	16	17	18	19	20	21	22	23	24	25	26
Ground	H	A	H	A	H	A	H	A	H	H	A	H	A	A	H	A	H	A	H	A	H	A	A	H	A	H
Result	W	L	D	D	L	L	D	L	W	L	L	L	L	W	W	D	W	L	D	L	W	L	L	L	L	W
Position	3	7	7	9	10	10	11	11	11	11	13	13	13	12	11	11	10	10	9	10	9	9	10	10	10	10

A = Away; H = Home; W = Win; D = Draw; L = Loss

==== Goalscorers in A Group ====
Rank	Scorer	Goals
1	(Bulgaria) Mario Metushev	5
2	(Bulgaria) Vesko Petkov	4
3	(Bulgaria) Stanislav Stoyanov	3
4	(Bulgaria) Georgi Iliev	2
5	(Bulgaria) Filip Teofoolu	1
5	(Romania) Costel Ilie	1
5	(Bulgaria) Ivo Mihaylov	1
5	(Bulgaria) Milen Petkov	1
5	(Bulgaria) Daniel Kalchev	1

=== Bulgarian Cup ===
4 November 2000 2nd Round	Cherno More	6 – 0	Haskovo	Varna
14:00 EEST	Kolev 6'; Metushev 30'; Dimov 34'; G. Iliev 57', 75'; Teofoolu 65'			Stadium: Ticha; Attendance: 400

21 November 2000 3rd Round; 1st Leg	Cherno More	1 – 3	Spartak Pleven	Varna
14:00 EEST	V. Petkov 74'	report	T. Kolev 35'; Panayotov 47'; E. Todorov 61'	Stadium: Ticha; Attendance: 600; Referee: Yordan Stalev (Plovdiv)

2 December 2000 3rd Round; 2nd Leg	Spartak Pleven	4 – 0	Cherno More	Pleven
13:30 EEST	T. Kolev 13'; E. Todorov 58'; Panayotov 77', 90'			Stadium: Pleven; Attendance: 2,000; Referee: Kamen Aleksiev (Veliko Tarnovo)

=== Pre-season and Friendlies ===
10 February 2001 Friendly	Cherno More Varna	1-0	Mladost Lukicevo	Varna, Bulgaria
14:30 UTC+3	Dobrev 61'; Iliev (yellow card)	Report		Stadium: Ticha; Attendance: 300; Referee: Radan Miryanov

12 February 2001 Friendly	Cherno More Varna	0-0	Nyva Ternopil	Varna, Bulgaria
14:30 UTC+3		Report	Ihor Biskup (yellow card)	Stadium: Ticha; Attendance: 100; Referee: Ivaylo Popov

17 February 2001 Friendly	Cherno More Varna	2-2	Farul Constanța	Varna, Bulgaria
14:30 UTC+3	Dejan Pravica 7' Stoyanov 40' (pen.)	Report	Cristian Negru 45' 50'	Stadium: Ticha; Attendance: 400; Referee: Stoycho Paunov

23 February 2001 Friendly	Cherno More	0 – 0	Belarus	Varna, Bulgaria
14:30 EEST		report		Stadium: Ticha; Attendance: 400; Referee: Stanislav Todorov (Shumen)
