= 1994–95 Ipswich Town F.C. season =

Ipswich Town
1994–95 season
- Chairman: John Kerr
- Manager: John Lyall (until 5 December 1994); Paul Goddard (caretaker) (5–28 December 1994); George Burley (from 28 December 1994)
- Premier League: 22nd (relegated)
- FA Cup: Third round
- League Cup: Second round
- Top goalscorer: League: Claus Thomsen (5); All: Claus Thomsen (5)
- Highest home attendance: 22,559 (vs Tottenham Hotspur, 30 Aug 1994, Premier League)
- Lowest home attendance: 7,787 (vs Bolton Wanderers, 21 Sep 1994, League Cup)
- Average home league attendance: 16,818

During the 1994–95 English football season, Ipswich Town competed in the FA Premier League.

== Season summary ==
Ipswich Town conceded 93 Premier League goals, kept just 3 clean sheets and recorded just 7 wins all season as one of the worst seasons in their history saw them return to the second tier of the league after three seasons in the top flight.

Manager John Lyall reverted to manager after being Director of Football for the previous season and during the summer, Steve Sedgley became the club's first £1 million signing. However, Ipswich experienced their worst start to a season for 31 years, losing 11 of their first 15 games. Following defeat by Manchester City at the beginning of December with Ipswich bottom of the league and relegation already looking more than likely, Lyall quit. Coach Paul Goddard stepped in as caretaker manager but former player George Burley was soon back at the club as manager, with Dale Roberts as his assistant. But the transition did little to alter Ipswich's fortunes. Before then though, in arguably their biggest highlight of the season, the Tractor Boys stunned reigning champions Manchester United by beating them 3–2 at Portman Road in September (having even led by 2–0 at one stage) which would ultimately be one of the defeats that cost United the title by one point. However, in the return fixture, an unthinkable double wasn't to be and a 9–0 humiliation at the hands of United at Old Trafford in early March, a record Premier League defeat, effectively crushed any remaining hopes of survival. The defeat was part of a run of seven defeats with Ipswich failing to score and their relegation was guaranteed on 14 April with six games remaining following results elsewhere. On a brighter note though, another highlight included a surprise 1–0 win at Anfield against eventual-4th-placed Liverpool in mid-January, their first win at Anfield in 34 attempts.

In the cups, Ipswich failed to progress in both, losing to First Division Bolton in the Coca Cola Cup and to Second Division Wrexham in the FA Cup.

With an ageing squad, Burley was given little option but to resort to his young reserves in hope of rebuilding his side ready to push for a Premier League comeback.

Former chairman Patrick Cobbold died in December.

== First-team squad ==
Squad at end of season

Note: Flags indicate national team as defined under FIFA eligibility rules; some limited exceptions apply. Players may hold more than one non-FIFA nationality.

No.	Pos.	Nation	Player
1	GK	CAN	Craig Forrest
2	MF	ENG	Mick Stockwell
3	DF	ENG	Neil Thompson
4	MF	ENG	Paul Mason
5	DF	SCO	John Wark
6	DF	ENG	David Linighan
7	MF	WAL	Geraint Williams
8	MF	ENG	Gavin Johnson
9	MF	BUL	Boncho Genchev
10	FW	ENG	Ian Marshall
11	FW	ENG	Lee Chapman
12	DF	DEN	Claus Thomsen
13	GK	ENG	Clive Baker

No.	Pos.	Nation	Player
14	MF	ENG	Steve Sedgley
16	DF	ENG	Chris Swailes
17	MF	ENG	Simon Milton
18	MF	ENG	Steve Palmer
19	DF	CAN	Frank Yallop
21	MF	ENG	Stuart Slater
22	MF	ENG	Lee Durrant
24	DF	ARG	Mauricio Taricco
25	MF	ENG	Adam Tanner
26	MF	URU	Adrián Paz
28	DF	ENG	Tony Vaughan
29	GK	ENG	Richard Wright
33	FW	SCO	Alex Mathie

=== Left club during season ===
Note: Flags indicate national team as defined under FIFA eligibility rules; some limited exceptions apply. Players may hold more than one non-FIFA nationality.

No.	Pos.	Nation	Player
11	FW	ENG	Chris Kiwomya (to Arsenal)
15	DF	ENG	Phil Whelan (to Middlesbrough)
16	DF	ENG	Eddie Youds (to Bradford City)

No.	Pos.	Nation	Player
20	MF	ENG	David Gregory (on loan to Hereford United)
30	FW	ZAM	Neil Gregory (on loan to Scunthorpe United)
32	DF	SCO	Andy Millen (loan return to Kilmarnock)

=== Reserve squad ===
Note: Flags indicate national team as defined under FIFA eligibility rules; some limited exceptions apply. Players may hold more than one non-FIFA nationality.

No.	Pos.	Nation	Player
23	GK	ENG	Phil Morgan
27	DF	ENG	Leo Cotterell
31	MF	NZL	Lee Norfolk
34	DF	ENG	Kevin Ellis
35	MF	SCO	Graham Connell

No.	Pos.	Nation	Player
-	DF	SCO	George Burley
-	DF	ENG	Matt Weston
-	FW	ENG	Richard Naylor
-	FW	ENG	James Scowcroft
-	FW	SCO	David Pirie

== Competitions ==
=== FA Premier League ===
==== League table ====
Pos	Team	Pld	W	D	L	GF	GA	GD	Pts	Qualification or relegation
18	Aston Villa	42	11	15	16	51	56	−5	48	
19	Crystal Palace (R)	42	11	12	19	34	49	−15	45	Relegation to Football League First Division
20	Norwich City (R)	42	10	13	19	37	54	−17	43	Relegation to Football League First Division
21	Leicester City (R)	42	6	11	25	45	80	−35	29	Relegation to Football League First Division
22	Ipswich Town (R)	42	7	6	29	36	93	−57	27	Relegation to Football League First Division

Source: Premier League
Rules for classification: 1) points; 2) goal difference; 3) number of goals scored.
(R) Relegated

==== Results summary ====
Overall								Home						Away					
Pld	W	D	L	GF	GA	GD	Pts	W	D	L	GF	GA	GD	W	D	L	GF	GA	GD
42	7	6	29	36	93	−57	27	5	3	13	24	34	−10	2	3	16	12	59	−47

Source: Statto

==== Results by round ====
Round	1	2	3	4	5	6	7	8	9	10	11	12	13	14	15	16	17	18	19	20	21	22	23	24	25	26	27	28	29	30	31	32	33	34	35	36	37	38	39	40	41	42
Ground	H	A	A	H	A	H	H	A	A	H	A	H	H	A	H	A	H	A	H	A	H	A	H	A	H	A	H	A	H	H	A	A	A	H	A	H	A	H	A	H	H	A
Result	L	D	W	L	L	L	W	L	L	L	L	L	W	L	L	D	L	L	D	D	L	L	W	W	D	L	L	L	W	L	L	L	L	L	L	L	L	D	L	W	L	L
Position	18	16	8	12	16	20	14	15	20	21	21	21	20	20	20	22	22	22	22	22	22	22	21	21	21	21	21	22	21	21	21	21	21	21	22	22	22	22	22	22	22	22

Source: Statto.com
A = Away; H = Home; W = Win; D = Draw; L = Loss

==== Legend ====
Win	Draw	Loss

Ipswich Town's score comes first

==== Matches ====
Date	Opponent	Venue	Result	Attendance	Scorers
20 August 1994	Nottingham Forest	H	0–1	18,882	
23 August 1994	Wimbledon	A	1–1	5,853	Milton
27 August 1994	Queens Park Rangers	A	2–1	12,456	Yates (own goal), Genchev
30 August 1994	Tottenham Hotspur	H	1–3	22,559	Kiwomya
10 September 1994	Aston Villa	A	0–2	22,241	
19 September 1994	Norwich City	H	1–2	17,447	Wark (pen)
24 September 1994	Manchester United	H	3–2	22,539	Mason (2), Sedgley
1 October 1994	Southampton	A	1–3	13,246	Marshall
10 October 1994	Coventry City	A	0–2	9,526	
16 October 1994	Sheffield Wednesday	H	1–2	13,073	Wark
23 October 1994	Chelsea	A	0–2	15,068	
29 October 1994	Liverpool	H	1–3	22,513	Paz
1 November 1994	Leeds United	H	2–0	15,956	Sedgley, Williams
5 November 1994	Crystal Palace	A	0–3	13,349	
19 November 1994	Blackburn Rovers	H	1–3	17,329	Thomsen
26 November 1994	Newcastle United	A	1–1	34,459	Thomsen
3 December 1994	Manchester City	H	1–2	13,504	Mason
10 December 1994	Nottingham Forest	A	1–4	21,340	Thomsen
16 December 1994	Wimbledon	H	2–2	11,367	Milton, Sedgley
26 December 1994	West Ham United	A	1–1	20,562	Thomsen
28 December 1994	Arsenal	H	0–2	22,054	
31 December 1994	Everton	A	1–4	25,659	Sedgley
2 January 1995	Leicester City	H	4–1	15,803	Kiwomya (2), Tanner, Yallop
14 January 1995	Liverpool	A	1–0	32,733	Tanner
21 January 1995	Chelsea	H	2–2	17,296	Slater, Wark (pen)
28 January 1995	Blackburn Rovers	A	1–4	21,325	Wark (pen)
4 February 1995	Crystal Palace	H	0–2	15,570	
22 February 1995	Manchester City	A	0–2	21,430	
25 February 1995	Southampton	H	2–1	16,076	Mathie, Chapman
28 February 1995	Newcastle United	H	0–2	18,639	
4 March 1995	Manchester United	A	0–9	43,804	
8 March 1995	Tottenham Hotspur	A	0–3	24,930	
20 March 1995	Norwich City	A	0–3	17,510	
1 April 1995	Aston Villa	H	0–1	15,710	
5 April 1995	Leeds United	A	0–4	28,600	
11 April 1995	Queens Park Rangers	H	0–1	11,767	
15 April 1995	Arsenal	A	1–4	36,818	Marshall
17 April 1995	West Ham United	H	1–1	19,099	Thomsen
29 April 1995	Leicester City	A	0–2	15,248	
6 May 1995	Coventry City	H	2–0	12,893	Marshall, Pressley (own goal)
9 May 1995	Everton	H	0–1	14,951	
14 May 1995	Sheffield Wednesday	A	1–4	30,213	Mathie

=== FA Cup ===
Round	Date	Opponent	Venue	Result	Attendance	Goalscorers
R3	7 January 1995	Wrexham	A	1–2	8,500	Linighan

=== League Cup ===
Round	Date	Opponent	Venue	Result	Attendance	Goalscorers
R2 1st Leg	21 September 1994	Bolton Wanderers	H	0–3	7,787	
R2 2nd Leg	5 October 1994	Bolton Wanderers	A	0–1 (lost 0–4 on agg)	8,212	

== Transfers ==
=== Transfers in ===
Date	Pos	Name	From	Fee	Ref
15 June 1994	DF	(Denmark) Claus Thomsen	(Denmark) AGF Aarhus	£250,000	
15 June 1994	MF	(England) Steve Sedgley	(England) Tottenham Hotspur	£1,000,000	
1 September 1994	MF	(Uruguay) Adrián Paz	(Argentina) Estudiantes de La Plata	Undisclosed	
9 September 1994	DF	(Argentina) Mauricio Taricco	(Argentina) Argentinos Juniors	£175,000	
19 January 1995	FW	(England) Lee Chapman	(England) West Ham United	£70,000	
24 February 1995	FW	(Scotland) Alex Mathie	(England) Newcastle United	£500,000	
23 March 1995	DF	(England) Chris Swailes	(England) Doncaster Rovers	£225,000	

=== Loans in ===
Date from	Pos	Name	From	Date until	Ref
1 February 1995	DF	(Scotland) Andy Millen	(Scotland) Kilmarnock	28 February 1995	

=== Transfers out ===
Date	Pos	Name	To	Fee	Ref
1 July 1994	FW	(England) Paul Goddard	Retired		
1 July 1994	FW	(England) Gary Thompson	Free agent	Released	
1 July 1994	DF	(England) Lee Honeywood	Free agent	Released	
13 January 1995	FW	(England) Chris Kiwomya	(England) Arsenal	£1,200,000	
3 March 1995	DF	(England) Phil Whelan	(England) Middlesbrough	£300,000	
17 March 1995	DF	(England) Eddie Youds	(England) Bradford City	£250,000	

=== Loans out ===
Date from	Pos	Name	From	Date until	Ref
9 January 1995	MF	(England) David Gregory	(England) Hereford United	31 May 1995	
20 January 1995	DF	(England) Eddie Youds	(England) Bradford City	17 March 1995	
6 March 1995	FW	(Zambia) Neil Gregory	(England) Scunthorpe United	31 May 1995	

== Awards ==
=== Player awards ===
Award	Player
Player of the Year	(Canada) Craig Forrest
Players' Player of the Year	(Canada) Craig Forrest
