= 1990–91 A Group =

43rd completed season of top-tier football league in Bulgaria

A Group
- Season: 1990–91
- Dates: 11 August 1990 – 8 June 1991
- Champions: Etar Veliko Tarnovo (1st title)
- Relegated: Dunav; Haskovo
- European Cup: Etar
- UEFA Cup: CSKA Sofia; Slavia Sofia
- Matches: 240
- Goals: 647 (2.7 per match)
- Top goalscorer: Ivaylo Yordanov (21 goals)

The 1990–91 A Group was the 43rd season of the A Football Group, the top Bulgarian professional league for association football clubs, since its establishment in 1948.

== Overview ==
It was contested by 16 teams, and Etar Veliko Tarnovo won the championship.

== Teams ==
=== Stadiums and locations ===
Locations of the 1990–91 Bulgarian A Group teams
Sofia 1990–91 A Group football clubs

Team	City	Stadium	Capacity
Beroe	Stara Zagora	Beroe	18,000
Botev	Plovdiv	Hristo Botev (Plovdiv)	30,000
Chernomorets	Burgas	Deveti Septemvri	18,000
CSKA	Sofia	Narodna Armia	26,000
Dunav	Ruse	Gradski; Dunav	22,000; 12,000
Etar	Veliko Tarnovo	Ivaylo	15,000
Haskovo	Haskovo	Haskovo	12,500
Levski	Sofia	Levski; Rakovski	40,000; 18,000
Lokomotiv	Gorna Oryahovitsa	Dimitar Dyulgerov	14,000
Lokomotiv	Plovdiv	Lokomotiv; Deveti Septemvri	13,000; 50,000
Lokomotiv	Sofia	Vasil Levski National Stadium	60,000
Minyor	Pernik	Minyor	20,000
Pirin	Blagoevgrad	Hristo Botev (Blagoevgrad)	15,000
Slavia	Sofia	Slavia	25,000
Sliven	Sliven	Hadzhi Dimitar	15,000
Yantra	Gabrovo	Hristo Botev (Gabrovo)	12,000

== League standings ==
Pos	Team	Pld	W	D	L	GF	GA	GD	Pts	Qualification or relegation
1	Etar Veliko Tarnovo (C)	30	18	8	4	49	21	+28	44	Qualification for European Cup first round
2	CSKA Sofia	30	14	9	7	51	28	+23	37	Qualification for UEFA Cup first round
3	Slavia Sofia	30	14	9	7	48	29	+19	37	Qualification for UEFA Cup first round
4	Lokomotiv Sofia	30	13	10	7	50	36	+14	36	
5	Botev Plovdiv	30	13	10	7	49	41	+8	36	
6	Levski Sofia	30	12	9	9	51	38	+13	33	Qualification for Cup Winners' Cup first round
7	Chernomorets Burgas	30	11	8	11	41	50	−9	30	
8	Lokomotiv G. Oryahovitsa	30	13	3	14	42	39	+3	29	
9	Beroe Stara Zagora	30	10	7	13	38	41	−3	27	
10	Minyor Pernik	30	10	7	13	36	44	−8	27	
11	Lokomotiv Plovdiv	30	9	9	12	34	42	−8	27	
12	Pirin Blagoevgrad	30	11	4	15	38	40	−2	26	
13	Sliven	30	9	8	13	39	49	−10	26	
14	Yantra Gabrovo	30	9	8	13	31	44	−13	26	
15	Dunav Ruse (R)	30	8	6	16	23	42	−19	22	Relegation to 1991–92 B Group
16	Haskovo (R)	30	7	3	20	27	63	−36	17	Relegation to 1991–92 B Group

Source: rsssf.com
(C) Champions; (R) Relegated

== Results ==
Home \ Away	BSZ	BOT	CHB	CSK	DUN	ETA	HAS	LEV	LGO	LPL	LSO	MIN	PIR	SLA	SLI	YAN
Beroe Stara Zagora		1–2	3–2	1–0	3–0	0–0	4–0	1–1	3–2	1–1	1–3	2–1	5–0	1–3	0–1	1–1
Botev Plovdiv	0–0		5–0	3–2	2–0	0–1	4–3	4–1	0–1	2–2	1–1	0–0	2–0	1–1	3–2	4–0
Chernomorets Burgas	2–1	1–1		1–1	5–1	1–1	1–0	3–3	2–1	0–0	3–1	2–0	2–1	2–1	2–0	0–0
CSKA Sofia	3–0	7–1	2–3		5–0	1–0	3–1	1–1	2–1	2–0	0–2	3–0	1–1	0–0	3–1	2–0
Dunav Ruse	1–0	0–0	2–2	1–2		0–1	1–0	1–0	2–1	3–0	1–1	1–0	0–1	0–0	2–1	1–1
Etar Veliko Tarnovo	2–0	4–0	3–2	1–1	2–0		3–0	4–2	2–1	2–0	1–0	2–0	0–0	1–0	2–0	3–1
Haskovo	1–2	2–0	1–1	2–0	0–2	3–2		2–4	1–0	3–1	1–1	1–1	0–1	1–0	2–1	0–2
Levski Sofia	1–1	2–3	5–1	0–1	2–0	0–1	1–0		2–1	4–0	1–2	2–0	2–1	3–4	4–0	1–0
Lokomotiv G. Oryahovitsa	2–3	2–0	3–1	2–0	3–1	0–4	1–0	2–0		2–0	1–1	3–0	2–1	0–2	1–0	3–1
Lokomotiv Plovdiv	2–0	1–1	5–0	0–1	1–0	1–1	4–0	1–1	3–2		1–1	1–0	2–0	1–1	2–0	2–0
Lokomotiv Sofia	3–0	1–1	2–0	0–3	1–0	1–1	3–1	2–2	1–1	3–0		5–2	3–1	0–1	3–0	4–0
Minyor Pernik	3–1	3–2	3–0	1–1	1–1	1–1	3–0	0–1	1–0	3–1	2–0		1–0	1–1	5–2	3–0
Pirin Blagoevgrad	1–0	0–1	1–2	2–2	1–0	2–0	6–0	0–3	1–2	3–0	4–0	4–0		1–1	2–0	1–0
Slavia Sofia	1–2	1–2	1–0	0–0	1–0	1–0	5–1	0–0	3–1	4–1	1–2	3–0	5–2		3–3	1–0
Sliven	1–0	2–2	1–0	2–1	2–1	2–2	5–1	1–1	0–0	2–1	2–2	0–0	2–0	0–2		5–1
Yantra Gabrovo	1–1	0–2	1–0	1–1	3–1	1–2	1–0	1–1	2–1	0–0	3–1	4–1	2–0	3–1	1–1	

Source: A PFG (in Bulgarian)
Legend: Blue = home team win; Yellow = draw; Red = away team win.

== Champions ==
Etar Veliko Tarnovo

Goalkeepers
(Bulgaria) Nikolay Donev	26	(0)
(Bulgaria) Kaloyan Chakarov	5	(0)

Defenders
(Bulgaria) Angel Chervenkov	27	(3)
(Bulgaria) Tsanko Tsvetanov	29	(0)
(Bulgaria) Tsvetomir Parvanov	29	(1)
(Bulgaria) Plamen Prodanov	28	(3)
(Bulgaria) Petar Georgiev	0	(0)

Midfielders
(Bulgaria) Iliyan Kiryakov	30	(8)
(Bulgaria) Gencho Genchev	16	(1)
(Bulgaria) Andriyan Gaydarski	22	(1)
(Bulgaria) Krasimir Balakov*	11	(3)
(Bulgaria) Georgi Popivanov	26	(3)
(Bulgaria) Aleksandar Dimov	30	(1)
(Bulgaria) Sasho Hristov	15	(1)
(Bulgaria) Aleksandar Aleksandrov	16	(1)
(Bulgaria) Georgi Georgiev	3	(0)

Forwards
(Bulgaria) Miroslav Baychev	18	(3)
(Soviet Union) Igor Kislov	21	(4)
(Bulgaria) Petyo Rashev	7	(1)
(Bulgaria) Boncho Genchev	27	(15)
(Bulgaria) Miroslav Mironov	0	(0)
(Bulgaria) Mariyan Metlarov	3	(0)

Manager
(Bulgaria) Georgi Vasilev

- Balakov left the club during a season.

== Top scorers ==
Rank	Scorer	Club	Goals
1	(Bulgaria) Ivaylo Yordanov	Lokomotiv GO	21
2	(Bulgaria) Petar Mihtarski	Levski Sofia	18
2	(Bulgaria) Yordan Lechkov	Sliven	18
4	(Bulgaria) Vladimir Stoyanov	Chernomorets Burgas	17
5	(Bulgaria) Boncho Genchev	Etar	15
6	(Bulgaria) Todor Pramatarov	Lokomotiv Sofia	14
6	(Bulgaria) Stefan Draganov	Lokomotiv Plovdiv	14
8	(Bulgaria) Vercho Mitov	Minyor Pernik	13
9	(Bulgaria) Yasen Petrov	Botev Plovdiv	11
9	(Bulgaria) Stanimir Stoilov	Levski Sofia	11

- Source:1990–91 Top Goalscorers

== Attendances ==
#	Club	Average
1	Levski	8,773
2	Etar	6,933
3	CSKA Sofia	6,533
4	Yantra	6,267
5	Dunav	6,000
6	Botev	5,500
7	Sliven	5,467
8	Pirin	5,267
9	Lokomotiv Plovdiv	5,200
10	Lokomotiv Sofia	4,733
11	Minyor	4,640
12	Lokomotiv GO	4,407
13	Beroe	3,593
14	Haskovo	3,527
15	Slavia Sofia	3,167
16	Chernomorets	2,967
