= Genchev =

Genchev (Bulgarian: Генчев, female form Gencheva (Генчева); also appearing in the German transliteration variants Gentschew or Gentscheff) is a Bulgarian patronymic surname which is derived from the male given name Gencho (Генчо) by adding the east Slavic patronymic suffix -ев (-ev). Notable people with the surname include:

- Angel Genchev (born 1967), Bulgarian weightlifter
- Boncho Genchev (born 1964), Bulgarian retired footballer
- Diyan Genchev (born 1975), Bulgarian retired footballer
- Lyubomir Genchev (born 1986), Bulgarian footballer
- Petar Genchev (born 1998), Bulgarian footballer
- Stanislav Genchev (born 1981), Bulgarian retired footballer
- Valentin Genchev (born 2000), Bulgarian weightlifter
