= 1994–95 Newcastle United F.C. season =

Newcastle United
1994–95 season
- Chairman: Sir John Hall
- Manager: Kevin Keegan
- Stadium: St James' Park
- FA Premier League: 6th
- FA Cup: Sixth round
- Football League Cup: Fourth round
- UEFA Cup: Second round
- Top goalscorer: League: Peter Beardsley (13); All: Peter Beardsley, Andy Cole (15)
- Highest home attendance: 35,626 (vs. Leeds United & Crystal Palace)
- Lowest home attendance: 27,208 (vs. Barnsley)
- Average home league attendance: 33,935
Home colours	Away colours	Third colours

This article covers the squad and match results for the 1994–95 season at the English association football club Newcastle United F.C. Newcastle United participated in the FA Premier League, finishing in 6th place.

== Season summary ==
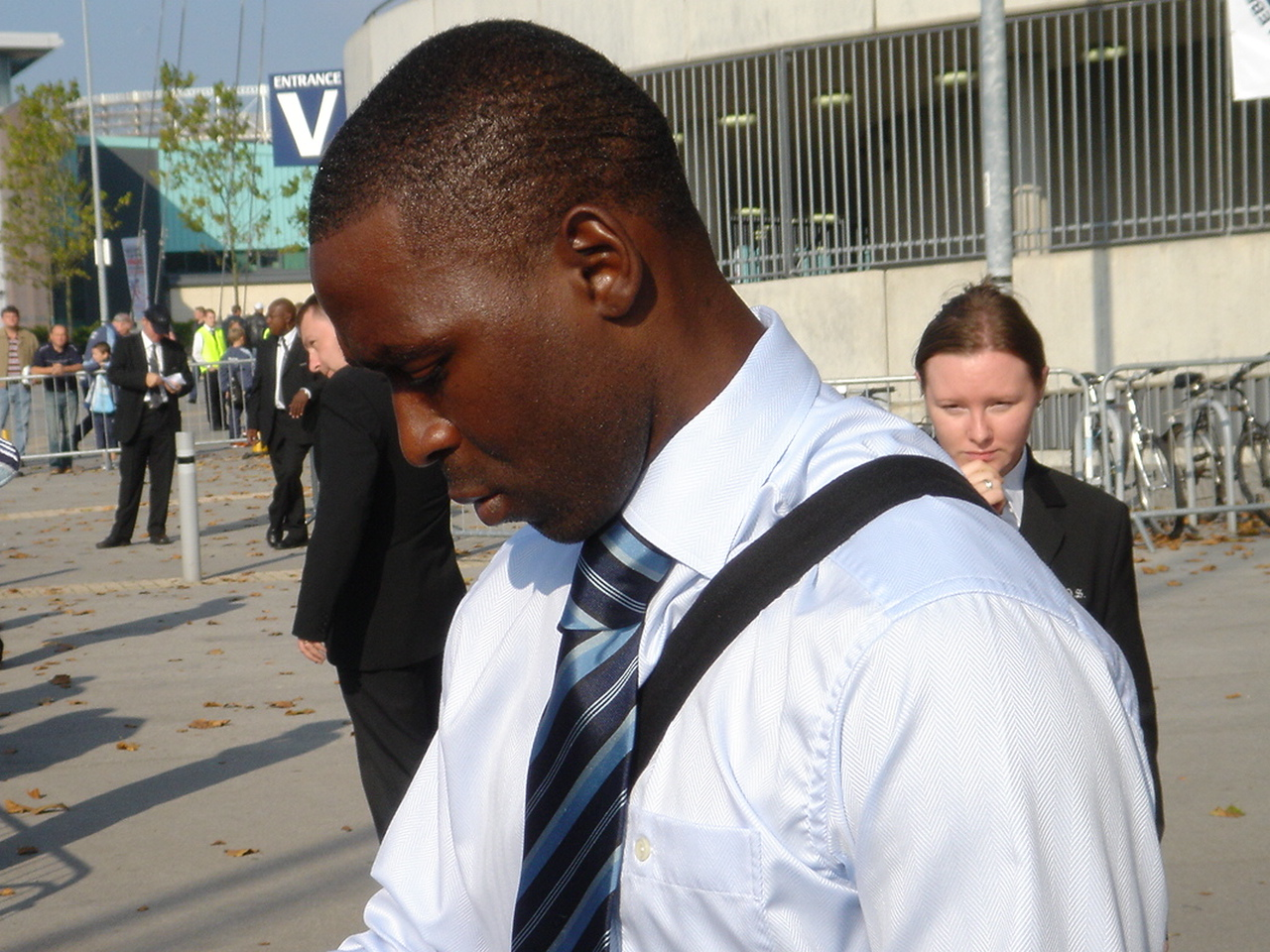
Andy Cole was sold to Manchester United in January 1995 for £7 million

Newcastle United made the best start to any top division season in their history, winning their first six games to go top. The first team had built up a reputation for playing an attacking, almost cavalier, brand of football under Kevin Keegan – their occasionally leaky defence was not a major problem, as the team could almost always score more than they conceded. In a shock move in January 1995, however, hugely influential striker Andy Cole joined Manchester United for £6 million plus £1 million midfielder Keith Gillespie, who joined Newcastle. Fans were saddened and confused with Keegan for selling Cole, leading to Keegan publicly confronting fans at St James' Park explaining his reasons on the day of the transfer.

By Christmas, Newcastle were no longer title favourites but still looked certain of a UEFA Cup place. But things failed to improve in the new year, and the sale of Cole seemed to accelerate their fall from grace. A sixth-place finish in the final table meant that they just missed out on another European campaign, but they were given hope of a fresh chase for honours next time round thanks to the close season signings of David Ginola and Les Ferdinand.

The 1994–95 season also saw the arrival of Marc Hottiger, Philippe Albert, Paul Kitson and Keith Gillespie, as well as the late and close season departures of Barry Venison, Alex Mathie, Mike Jeffrey and Paul Bracewell.

== Final league table ==
Pos	Team	Pld	W	D	L	GF	GA	GD	Pts	Qualification or relegation
4	Liverpool	42	21	11	10	65	37	+28	74	Qualification for the UEFA Cup first round (Note: Leeds United were rewarded entry to the UEFA Cup through UEFA Fair Play ranking.)
5	Leeds United	42	20	13	9	59	38	+21	73	Qualification for the UEFA Cup first round
6	Newcastle United	42	20	12	10	67	47	+20	72	
7	Tottenham Hotspur	42	16	14	12	66	58	+8	62	Qualification for the Intertoto Cup group stage
8	Queens Park Rangers	42	17	9	16	61	59	+2	60	

Source: Premier League
Rules for classification: 1) points; 2) goal difference; 3) number of goals scored.

== Appearances, goals and cards ==
(Substitute appearances in brackets)

No.	Pos.	Name	League		FA Cup		League Cup		UEFA Cup		Total		Discipline	
No.	Pos.	Name	Apps	Goals	Apps	Goals	Apps	Goals	Apps	Goals	Apps	Goals	Yellow card	Red card
1	GK	(Czech Republic) Pavel Srníček	38	0	5	0	5	0	4	0	52	0	?	2
2	DF	(England) Barry Venison	28	1	5	0	2	0	1	0	36	1	?	0
3	DF	(England) John Beresford	33	0	4	1	5	0	4	0	46	1	?	0
4	MF	(England) Paul Bracewell	13 (3)	0	3	0	0 (1)	0	0	0	16 (4)	0	?	0
5	MF	(Montserrat) Ruel Fox	40	10	5	0	2	1	4	1	51	12	?	0
6	DF	(England) Steve Howey	29 (1)	1	4	0	4	0	3	0	40 (1)	1	?	0
7	MF	(England) Robert Lee	35	9	4	1	2	0	3	4	44	14	?	1
8	MF	(England) Peter Beardsley	34	13	3	0	3	0	4	2	44	15	?	0
9	FW	(England) Andy Cole	18	9	1	0	5	2	3	4	27	15	?	0
10	MF	(England) Lee Clark	9 (10)	1	2	1	3	0	1 (2)	0	15 (12)	2	?	0
11	MF	(England) Scott Sellars	12	0	0	0	3	0	4	1	19	1	?	0
12	DF	(Switzerland) Marc Hottiger	38	1	4	1	5	0	4	0	51	2	?	0
14	FW	(Scotland) Alex Mathie	3 (6)	1	0	0	1 (2)	0	0	0	4 (8)	1	?	0
15	DF	(England) Darren Peacock	35	1	5	0	4	0	4	0	48	1	?	0
18	MF	(England) Steve Guppy	0	0	0	0	0 (1)	0	0	0	0 (1)	0	?	0
18	MF	(Northern Ireland) Keith Gillespie	15 (2)	2	3	2	0	0	0	0	18 (2)	4	?	0
19	DF	(England) Steve Watson	22 (5)	4	0 (1)	0	3 (1)	0	1 (2)	1	26 (9)	5	?	0
20	DF	(Wales) Alan Neilson	5 (1)	0	0	0	1	0	0	0	6 (1)	0	?	0
21	FW	(Wales) Malcolm Allen	0 (1)	0	0	0	0	0	0	0	0 (1)	0	?	0
26	DF	(England) Robbie Elliott	10 (4)	2	3 (1)	0	0	0	0	0	13 (5)	2	?	0
27	DF	(Belgium) Philippe Albert	17	2	0	0	3	1	4	0	24	3	?	1
28	FW	(England) Paul Kitson	24 (2)	8	4 (1)	3	3	1	0	0	31 (3)	12	?	0
30	GK	(England) Mike Hooper	4 (2)	0	0	0	0	0	0	0	4 (2)	0	?	0
31	FW	(England) Mike Jeffrey	0	0	0	0	1	1	0 (2)	0	1 (2)	1	?	0

=== Coaching staff ===
Position	Staff
Manager	(England) Kevin Keegan
Assistant Manager	(England) Terry McDermott
First Team coach	(England) Arthur Cox

== Transfers ==
=== In ===
Date	Pos.	Name	From	Fee
1 August 1994	DF	(Switzerland) Marc Hottiger	(Switzerland) FC Sion	£600,000
2 August 1994	MF	(England) Steve Guppy	Wycombe Wanderers	£150,000
3 August 1994	MF	(England) Jason Drysdale	Watford	£425,000
10 August 1994	DF	(Belgium) Philippe Albert	(Belgium) Anderlecht	£2,700,000
26 September 1994	FW	(England) Paul Kitson	Derby County	£2,300,000
10 January 1995	MF	(Northern Ireland) Keith Gillespie	Manchester United	£750,000
1 March 1995	MF	(Republic of Ireland) Jimmy Crawford	(Republic of Ireland) Bohemians	£75,000
Unknown	GK	(England) John Burridge	(Scotland) Aberdeen	Free

- Total spending: ▼£6.175m

=== Out ===
Date	Pos.	Name	To	Fee
16 June 1994	DF	(England) Matty Appleby	Darlington	Free
19 June 1994	FW	(England) Alun Armstrong	Stockport County	£35,000
22 July 1994	DF	(England) Mark Robinson	Swindon Town	£600,000
25 November 1994	MF	(England) Steve Guppy	Port Vale	£225,000
December 1994	MF	(Cyprus) Nikki Papavasiliou	(Greece) OFI	£25,000
12 January 1995	FW	(England) Andy Cole	Manchester United	£6,250,000
24 February 1995	FW	(Scotland) Alex Mathie	Ipswich Town	£500,000
23 March 1995	DF	(England) Jason Drysdale	Swindon Town	£340,000
23 May 1995	MF	(England) Paul Bracewell	Sunderland	£50,000
Unknown	GK	(England) John Burridge	(Scotland) Dunfermline Athletic	Free

- Total income: ▲£8.025m

== Competitions ==
Win Draw Loss

=== Pre-season ===
Match	1	2	3	4	5	6
Result	1–2	2–0	3–4	1–1 (Pens: 6–5)	1–3	5–2

=== League ===
Pos	Team	Pld	W	D	L	GF	GA	GD	Pts	Qualification or relegation
4	Liverpool	42	21	11	10	65	37	+28	74	Qualification for the UEFA Cup first round (Note: Leeds United were rewarded entry to the UEFA Cup through UEFA Fair Play ranking.)
5	Leeds United	42	20	13	9	59	38	+21	73	Qualification for the UEFA Cup first round
6	Newcastle United	42	20	12	10	67	47	+20	72	
7	Tottenham Hotspur	42	16	14	12	66	58	+8	62	Qualification for the Intertoto Cup group stage
8	Queens Park Rangers	42	17	9	16	61	59	+2	60	

Source: Premier League
Rules for classification: 1) points; 2) goal difference; 3) number of goals scored.
Notes:

Round	1	2	3	4	5	6	7	8	9	10	11	12	13	14	15	16	17	18	19	20	21
Result	3–1	4–0	5–1	3–1	4–2	3–2	1–1	2–0	1–1	1–0	2–1	0–2	2–1	0–0	2–3	1–1	2–4	3–1	0–0	0–0	1–2
Position	3rd	1st	1st	1st	1st	1st	1st	1st	1st	1st	1st	1st	1st	1st	3rd	3rd	3rd	3rd	3rd	3rd	4th

Round	22	23	24	25	26	27	28	29	30	31	32	33	34	35	36	37	38	39	40	41	42
Result	0–0	1–1	0–0	2–1	2–0	0–3	2–1	3–1	2–0	0–2	2–0	1–0	1–3	1–1	3–0	0–2	1–2	0–0	3–3	0–1	3–2
Position	5th	5th	4th	4th	3rd	3rd	3rd	3rd	3rd	3rd	3rd	3rd	3rd	3rd	3rd	4th	5th	5th	5th	5th	6th

=== FA Cup ===
Match	1	2	3	4	5
Result	1–1	2–1	3–0	3–1	0–1

=== League Cup ===
Match	1	2	3	4	5
Result	2–1	1–0	2–0	1–1	0–2

=== UEFA Cup ===
Match	1	2	3	4
Result	5–0	5–2	3–2	0–1

== Matches ==
=== Pre-season ===
27 July 1994	MYPA	2–1	Newcastle United	Kouvola
	(?); Hyypiä (?)		Cole (?)

28 July 1994	Visan Pallo	0–2	Newcastle United	Kemi
			Lee (?); Mathie (?)	Stadium: Sauvosaaren Urheilupuisto

1 August 1994	Wrexham	4–3	Newcastle United	Wrexham
	1'; 46'; 60'; 65'		Mathie 35', 89'; Beardsley 58'	Stadium: Racecourse Ground; Attendance: 5,842

5 August 1994 Ibrox Tournament Semi-Final	Manchester United	1–1 (5–6 p)	Newcastle United	Glasgow
	Cantona 43'		Fox 19'	Stadium: Ibrox Stadium; Attendance: 27,282

6 August 1994 Ibrox Tournament Final	Sampdoria	3–1	Newcastle United	Glasgow
	Lombardo 38', 60'; Bertarelli 68' (pen.)		Cole 9'	Stadium: Ibrox Stadium; Attendance: 31,362

12 August 1994	Northern Ireland XI	2–5	Newcastle United
	(?) (?)		Cole (?); Fox (?); Lee (?); Mathie (?); Elliott (?)

=== League ===
21 August 1994	Leicester City	1–3	Newcastle United	Leicester
	Joachim 90'		Cole 51'; Beardsley 58'; Elliott 74'; Srníček (red card)	Stadium: Filbert Street; Attendance: 20,048

24 August 1994	Newcastle United	4–0	Coventry City	Newcastle upon Tyne
	Lee 21', 34'; Watson 26'; Cole 73'			Stadium: St James' Park; Attendance: 34,163

27 August 1994	Newcastle United	5–1	Southampton	Newcastle upon Tyne
	Watson 30', 37'; Cole 40', 70'; Lee 85'		Banger 52'	Stadium: St James' Park; Attendance: 34,181

31 August 1994	West Ham United	1–3	Newcastle United	London
	Hutchison 87' (pen.)		Potts 32' (o.g.); Lee 35'; Mathie 88'	Stadium: Boleyn Ground; Attendance: 18,580

10 September 1994	Newcastle United	4–2	Chelsea	Newcastle upon Tyne
	Cole 7', 66'; Fox 21'; Lee 53'		Peacock 15'; Furlong 27'; Wise (red card)	Stadium: St James' Park; Attendance: 34,435

18 September 1994	Arsenal	2–3	Newcastle United	London
	Adams 9'; Wright 88'		Keown 7' (o.g.); Beardsley 45' (pen.); Fox 74'	Stadium: Arsenal Stadium; Attendance: 36,819

24 September 1994	Newcastle United	1–1	Liverpool	Newcastle upon Tyne
	Lee 50'; Albert (yellow card) (red card)		Rush 70'	Stadium: St James' Park; Attendance: 34,435

1 October 1994	Aston Villa	0–2	Newcastle United	Birmingham
			Lee 66'; Cole 83'	Stadium: Villa Park; Attendance: 29,960

9 October 1994	Newcastle United	1–1	Blackburn Rovers	Newcastle upon Tyne
	Flowers 88' (o.g.)		Shearer 58' (pen.)	Stadium: St James' Park; Attendance: 34,344

15 October 1994	Crystal Palace	0–1	Newcastle United	London
			Beardsley 89'	Stadium: Selhurst Park; Attendance: 17,760

22 October 1994	Newcastle United	2–1	Sheffield Wednesday	Newcastle upon Tyne
	Watson 35'; Cole 37'		Taylor 55'	Stadium: St James' Park; Attendance: 34,408

29 October 1994	Manchester United	2–0	Newcastle United	Manchester
	Pallister 11'; Gillespie 77'			Stadium: Old Trafford; Attendance: 43,795

5 November 1994	Newcastle United	2–1	Queens Park Rangers	Newcastle upon Tyne
	Kitson 20'; Beardsley 42'		Dichio 60'	Stadium: St James' Park; Attendance: 34,278

7 November 1994	Nottingham Forest	0–0	Newcastle United	Nottingham
				Stadium: City Ground; Attendance: 22,102

19 November 1994	Wimbledon	3–2	Newcastle United	London
	Clarke 2'; Ekoku 27'; Harford 36'		Beardsley 30'; Kitson 32'	Stadium: Selhurst Park; Attendance: 14,203

26 November 1994	Newcastle United	1–1	Ipswich Town	Newcastle upon Tyne
	Cole 86'		Thomsen 89'	Stadium: St James' Park; Attendance: 34,459

3 December 1994	Tottenham Hotspur	4–2	Newcastle United	London
	Sheringham 15', 39', 71'; Popescu 80'		Fox 30', 42'	Stadium: White Hart Lane; Attendance: 28,002

10 December 1994	Newcastle United	3–1	Leicester City	Newcastle upon Tyne
	Albert 32', 70'; Howey 50'		Oldfield 48'	Stadium: St James' Park; Attendance: 34,400

17 December 1994	Coventry City	0–0	Newcastle United	Coventry
				Stadium: Highfield Road; Attendance: 17,233

26 December 1994	Leeds United	0–0	Newcastle United	Leeds
				Stadium: Elland Road; Attendance: 39,337

31 December 1994	Norwich City	2–1	Newcastle United	Norwich
	Adams 1'; Ward 10'		Fox 40' (pen.)	Stadium: Carrow Road; Attendance: 22,172

2 January 1995	Newcastle United	0–0	Manchester City	Newcastle upon Tyne
				Stadium: St James' Park; Attendance: 34,437

15 January 1995	Newcastle United	1–1	Manchester United	Newcastle upon Tyne
	Kitson 67'		Hughes 13'	Stadium: St James' Park; Attendance: 34,471

21 January 1995	Sheffield Wednesday	0–0	Newcastle United	Sheffield
				Stadium: Hillsborough Stadium; Attendance: 31,215

25 January 1995	Newcastle United	2–1	Wimbledon	Newcastle upon Tyne
	Fox 34'; Kitson 51'		Ekoku 78'	Stadium: St James' Park; Attendance: 34,374

1 February 1995	Newcastle United	2–0	Everton	Newcastle upon Tyne
	Fox 74'; Beardsley 80' (pen.)			Stadium: St James' Park; Attendance: 34,465

4 February 1995	Queens Park Rangers	3–0	Newcastle United	London
	Ferdinand 4', 7'; Barker 18'			Stadium: Loftus Road; Attendance: 16,576

11 February 1995	Newcastle United	2–1	Nottingham Forest	Newcastle upon Tyne
	Fox 47'; Lee 73'		Lee 74'	Stadium: St James' Park; Attendance: 34,471

25 February 1995	Newcastle United	3–1	Aston Villa	Newcastle upon Tyne
	Venison 31'; Beardsley 55', 66'		Townsend 40'	Stadium: St James' Park; Attendance: 34,637

28 February 1995	Ipswich Town	0–2	Newcastle United	Ipswich
			Fox 12'; Kitson 38'	Stadium: Portman Road; Attendance: 18,639

4 March 1995	Liverpool	2–0	Newcastle United	Liverpool
	Fowler 57'; Rush 63'			Stadium: Anfield; Attendance: 39,300

8 March 1995	Newcastle United	2–0	West Ham United	Newcastle upon Tyne
	Clark 17'; Kitson 52'			Stadium: St James' Park; Attendance: 34,595

19 March 1995	Newcastle United	1–0	Arsenal	Newcastle upon Tyne
	Beardsley 90'			Stadium: St James' Park; Attendance: 35,611

22 March 1995	Southampton	3–1	Newcastle United	Southampton
	Heaney 86'; Watson 89'; Shipperley 90'		Kitson 17'	Stadium: The Dell; Attendance: 14,676

1 April 1995	Chelsea	1–1	Newcastle United	London
	Peacock 38'		Hottiger 88'	Stadium: Stamford Bridge; Attendance: 22,987

8 April 1995	Newcastle United	3–0	Norwich City	Newcastle upon Tyne
	Beardsley 8' (pen.), 42'; Kitson 74'			Stadium: St James' Park; Attendance: 35,518

14 April 1995	Everton	2–0	Newcastle United	Liverpool
	Amokachi 22', 55'		Lee (red card)	Stadium: Goodison Park; Attendance: 34,811

17 April 1995	Newcastle United	1–2	Leeds United	Newcastle upon Tyne
	Elliott 30'		McAllister 25' (pen.); Yeboah 31'	Stadium: St James' Park; Attendance: 35,626

29 April 1995	Manchester City	0–0	Newcastle United	Manchester
				Stadium: Maine Road; Attendance: 27,389

3 May 1995	Newcastle United	3–3	Tottenham Hotspur	Newcastle upon Tyne
	Gillespie 7'; Peacock 10'; Beardsley 70'; Srníček (red card)		Barmby 22'; Klinsmann 24'; Anderton 26'	Stadium: St James' Park; Attendance: 35,603

8 May 1995	Blackburn Rovers	1–0	Newcastle United	Blackburn
	Shearer 29'			Stadium: Ewood Park; Attendance: 30,545

14 May 1995	Newcastle United	3–2	Crystal Palace	Newcastle upon Tyne
	Fox 6'; Lee 26'; Gillespie 28'		Armstrong 51'; Houghton 81'	Stadium: St James' Park; Attendance: 35,626

=== FA Cup ===
8 January 1995 Round 3	Newcastle United	1–1	Blackburn Rovers	Newcastle upon Tyne
	Lee 56'		Sutton 30'	Stadium: St James' Park; Attendance: 31,721

18 January 1995 Round 3 replay	Blackburn Rovers	1–2	Newcastle United	Blackburn
	Sutton 75'		Hottiger 58'; Clark 85'	Stadium: Ewood Park; Attendance: 22,658

28 January 1995 Round 4	Newcastle United	3–0	Swansea City	Newcastle upon Tyne
	Kitson 41', 46', 72'			Stadium: St James' Park; Attendance: 34,372

19 February 1995 Round 5	Newcastle United	3–1	Manchester City	Newcastle upon Tyne
	Gillespie 18', 64'; Beresford 34'		Rösler 29'	Stadium: St James' Park; Attendance: 33,219

12 March 1995 Round 6	Everton	1–0	Newcastle United	Liverpool
	Watson 66'			Stadium: Goodison Park; Attendance: 35,203

=== League Cup ===
21 September 1994 Round 2 1st leg	Newcastle United	2–1	Barnsley	Newcastle upon Tyne
	Cole 25'; Fox 85'		Redfearn 20'	Stadium: St James' Park; Attendance: 27,208

5 October 1994 Round 2 2nd leg	Barnsley	0–1 (1–3 agg.)	Newcastle United	Barnsley
			Cole 41'	Stadium: Oakwell; Attendance: 10,992

26 October 1994 Round 3	Newcastle United	2–0	Manchester United	Newcastle upon Tyne
	Albert 82'; Kitson 87'			Stadium: St James' Park; Attendance: 34,178

30 November 1994 Round 4	Manchester City	1–1	Newcastle United	Manchester
	Rösler 69'		Jeffrey 11'	Stadium: Maine Road; Attendance: 25,162

21 December 1994 Round 4 replay	Newcastle United	0–2	Manchester City	Newcastle upon Tyne
			Rösler 11'; Walsh 80'	Stadium: St James' Park; Attendance: 31,056

=== UEFA Cup ===
13 September 1994 Round 1 1st leg	Royal Antwerp	0–5	Newcastle United	Antwerp
			Lee 1', 9', 50'; Sellars 39'; Watson 78'	Stadium: Bosuilstadion; Attendance: 19,700

27 September 1994 Round 1 2nd leg	Newcastle United	5–2 (10–2 agg.)	Royal Antwerp	Newcastle upon Tyne
	Lee 10'; Cole 26', 39', 88'; Beardsley 35' (pen.)		Kiekens 79'; Severeyns 80'	Stadium: St James' Park; Attendance: 31,383

18 October 1994 Round 2 1st leg	Newcastle United	3–2	Athletic Bilbao	Newcastle upon Tyne
	Fox 9'; Beardsley 34' (pen.); Cole 56'		Ziganda 72'; Suances 80'	Stadium: St James' Park; Attendance: 32,440

1 November 1994 Round 2 2nd leg	Athletic Bilbao	1–0 (3a – 3 agg.)	Newcastle United	Bilbao
	Ziganda 51'			Stadium: San Mamés Stadium; Attendance: 47,000
