= Deren Ibrahim =

Gibraltarian footballer (born 1991)

Personal information
- Full name: Deren Ibrahim
- Date of birth: 9 March 1991 (age 35)
- Place of birth: Sidcup, England
- Position: Goalkeeper

Team information
- Current team: Gillingham (goalkeeping coach)

Youth career
- 1999–2001: Queens Park Rangers
- 2001–2003: Dartford
- 2003–2006: Corinthian-Casuals

Senior career*
Years	Team	Apps	(Gls)
2008–2018	Dartford	176	(2)
2010–2011	→ Sittingbourne (loan)	38	(0)
2010	→ St. Andrews (loan)	?	(?)
2011	→ Margate (loan)	5	(0)
2012–2013	→ Maidstone United (loan)	32	(0)
2013–2014	→ Leatherhead (loan)	?	(?)
2014–2015	→ Tonbridge Angels (loan)	?	(?)
2019	Cray Valley PM	0	(0)
2019	Tonbridge Angels	0	(0)
2019	Cray Valley PM	0	(0)

International career
2016–2017	Gibraltar	8	(0)

Managerial career
- 2022–: Gillingham (goalkeeping coach)
- * Club domestic league appearances and goals

Deren Ibrahim (born 9 March 1991) is a retired Gibraltarian footballer who played as a goalkeeper. He is goalkeeping coach at Gillingham and the Wales U19 national team.

== Career ==
=== Club ===
Between the ages of eight and eleven, Ibrahim was a member of the academy of Queens Park Rangers. Ibrahim advanced through the youth levels of Dartford beginning in 2001 before making his debut on 13 March 2008. In 2010, he signed a three-month loan contract with Maltese club St. Andrews. He has also had loan spells with Sittingbourne, Margate, Maidstone United, Leatherhead, and Phoenix Sports. He made a total of eight appearances for Margate. In 2014, he signed a short-term loan with Tonbridge Angels. At the age of 24 in 2015, Ibrahim was named Dartford's first-choice goalkeeper after making 37 appearances for the club since his league debut in 2008. Ibrahim scored his first goal for Dartford on 27 August 2016 with a free kick from his own half against Hungerford Town and his second against Chippenham Town on 13 October 2018 again from a free kick in his own half.

In October 2018, Ibrahim departed Dartford to take up an academy goalkeeping coach role at Charlton Athletic.

In March 2019, Ibrahim played one FA Vase game for Cray Valley PM.

On 30 March 2019, Ibrahim joined Tonbridge Angels until the end of the 2018–19 season. However, he returned to Cray Valley PM in May 2019 to sit on the bench in the 2019 FA Vase Final.

=== International ===
Ibrahim was called up to the Gibraltar national football team for the first time in October 2016 for 2018 FIFA World Cup qualifiers against Estonia and Belgium. He made his international debut in the match against Belgium, an eventual 0–6 defeat.

==== International career statistics ====
As of match played 11 October 2017

Gibraltar national team
Year	Apps	Goals
2016	2	0
2017	6	0
Total	8	0

== Coaching career ==
On 14 February 2022, Ibrahim was announced to have joined the coaching staff of League One side Gillingham.
