= 2019 FA Vase final =

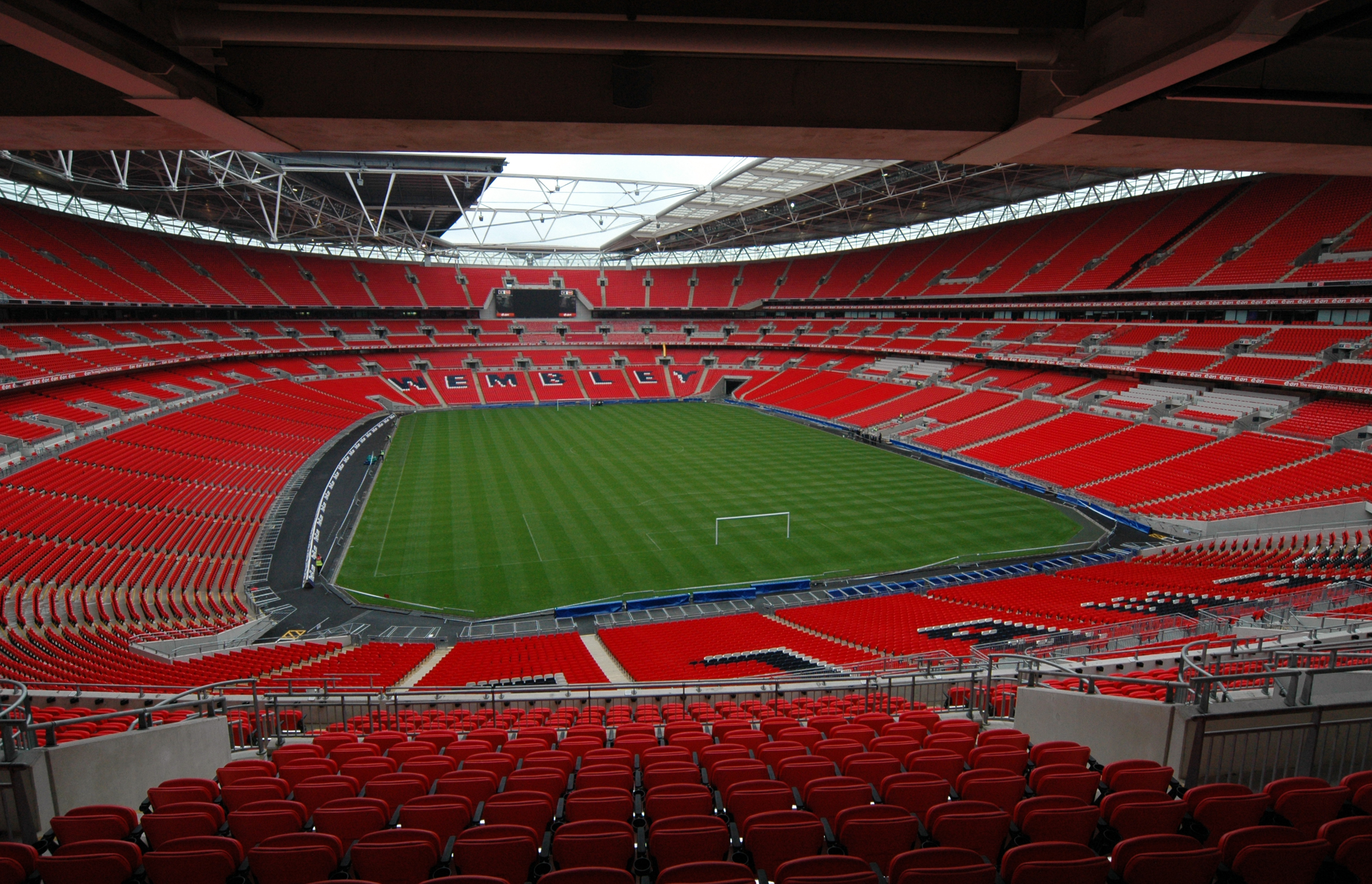
- Wembley Stadium hosted the final
- Event: 2018–19 FA Vase
Chertsey Town	Cray Valley Paper Mills
3	1
- After extra time
- Date: 19 May 2019
- Venue: Wembley Stadium, London
- Attendance: 42,962

The 2019 FA Vase final was the 45th final of the Football Association's cup competition for teams at levels 9–11 of the English football league system. The match was contested between Chertsey Town, of the Combined Counties Premier Division, and Cray Valley Paper Mills, of the Southern Counties East Premier Division. This was the first time both teams had reached the final and the first visit to Wembley Stadium for both sides. The final of the FA Trophy was played on the same day at the same venue for the fourth year running, as part of the FA's Non-League Finals Day. Both matches were televised in the UK on BT Sport.

Chertsey Town began their campaign in the first qualifying round, with a victory over Woodley United. They proceeded to defeat Tadley Calleva, Flackwell Heath, Horndean, Redbridge, St. Austell, Irlam and West Auckland Town en route to the semi-final where they faced Northwich Victoria. After a 1–1 draw in the first leg, Chertsey Town drew 0–0 after extra time in the second leg before winning 5–3 on penalties, securing a place in the final.

Cray Valley Paper Mills also began their campaign in the first qualifying round, where they defeated Sutton Athletic. Victories over Hailsham Town, St. Panteleimon, Badshot Lea, Sheppey United, Baffins Milton Rovers, Abbey Rangers and Willand Rovers saw them reach the semi-final where they faced Canterbury City. Cray Valley Paper Mills won the round 2–1 on aggregate after winning the first leg 1–0, and a 1–1 draw in the second leg.

== Route to the final ==
=== Chertsey Town ===
1 September 2018 First round qualifying	Chertsey Town	4–2	Woodley United	Chertsey
				Stadium: Alwyns Lane; Attendance: 92

15 September 2018 Second round qualifying	Tadley Calleva	0–1	Chertsey Town	Tadley
				Stadium: Barlows Park; Attendance: 148

13 October 2018 First round	Chertsey Town	6–1	Flackwell Heath	Chertsey
				Stadium: Alwyns Lane; Attendance: 167

3 November 2018 Second round	Chertsey Town	2–0	Horndean	Chertsey
				Stadium: Alwyns Lane; Attendance: 169

8 December 2018 Third round	Redbridge	0–5	Chertsey Town	Barkingside
				Stadium: Oakside Stadium; Attendance: 68

5 January 2019 Fourth round	Chertsey Town	5–0	St. Austell	Chertsey
				Stadium: Alwyns Lane; Attendance: 501

9 February 2019 Fifth round	Irlam	0–2	Chertsey Town	Irlam
				Stadium: Silver Street; Attendance: 449

23 February 2019 Quarter-Final	West Auckland Town	0–2	Chertsey Town	West Auckland
				Stadium: Darlington Road; Attendance: 738

16 March 2019 Semi-Final 1st Leg	Northwich Victoria	P–P	Chertsey Town	Wincham
				Stadium: Wincham Park

24 March 2019 Semi-Final 1st Leg	Northwich Victoria	1–1	Chertsey Town	Wincham
	Whyte 72'		Taylor 40'	Stadium: Wincham Park; Attendance: 1,288; Referee: James Oldham

30 March 2019 Semi-Final 2nd Leg	Chertsey Town	0–0 (a.e.t.) (1–1 agg.) (5–3 p)	Northwich Victoria	Chertsey
15:00				Stadium: Alwyns Lane; Attendance: 1,680; Referee: Savvas Yianni
	Penalties
	Baxter (penalty scored); Guentchev (penalty scored); Taylor (penalty scored); Crossley (penalty scored); Murphy (penalty scored)		(penalty scored) Craig; (penalty missed) Winder; (penalty scored) Matthews; (penalty scored) Doran

=== Cray Valley Paper Mills ===
1 September 2018 First round qualifying	Sutton Athletic	1–2	Cray Valley Paper Mills	Sutton-at-Hone
				Stadium: London Hire Stadium; Attendance: 60

16 September 2018 Second round qualifying	Cray Valley Paper Mills	2–0	Hailsham Town	Eltham
				Stadium: Badgers Sports Ground; Attendance: 106

13 October 2018 First round	St. Panteleimon	A–A	Cray Valley Paper Mills	Greenford
				Stadium: Berkeley Fields; Attendance: 50
Note: Match abandoned after 104 minutes due to injury to a St. Panteleimon player when the score was 1–1.

17 October 2018 First round	St. Panteleimon	1–3	Cray Valley Paper Mills	Greenford
				Stadium: Berkeley Fields; Attendance: 56

4 November 2018 Second round	Badshot Lea	0–7	Cray Valley Paper Mills	Badshot Lea
				Stadium: Krooner Park; Attendance: 54

1 December 2018 Third round	Sheppey United	0–4	Cray Valley Paper Mills	Isle of Sheppey
				Stadium: The Havill Stadium - Holm Park; Attendance: 202

5 January 2019 Fourth round	Cray Valley Paper Mills	3–1	Baffins Milton Rovers	Eltham
				Stadium: Badgers Sports Ground; Attendance: 139

2 February 2019 Fifth round	Cray Valley Paper Mills	3–1	Abbey Rangers	Eltham
				Stadium: Badgers Sports Ground; Attendance: 217

23 February 2019 Quarter-Final	Willand Rovers	1–3	Cray Valley Paper Mills	Willand
				Stadium: Stan Robinson Stadium; Attendance: 758

17 March 2019 Semi-Final 1st Leg	Cray Valley Paper Mills	1–0	Canterbury City	Eltham
				Stadium: Badgers Sports Ground; Attendance: 663

23 March 2019 Semi-Final 2nd Leg	Canterbury City	1–1 (1–2 agg.)	Cray Valley Paper Mills	Faversham
	Sayer 90'		Tomlin 71'	Stadium: Salters Lane; Attendance: 1,274; Referee: Josh Smith

== Match ==
=== Details ===
19 May 2019
12:15 BST

Chertsey Town	3–1 (a.e.t.)	Cray Valley Paper Mills
Flegg 39'; Baxter 105' (pen.); Rowe 117'	Report	Tomlin 36'

Wembley Stadium, London
Attendance: 42,962
Referee: Ross Joyce

GK	1	(England) Nick Jupp
DF	3	(England) Mason Welch-Turner
DF	5	(England) Michael Peacock
DF	6	(England) Quincy Rowe
DF	18	(England) Sam Flegg
MF	4	(England) Kevin Maclaren (c)	(substituted off) 79'
MF	7	(Bulgaria) Lyubomir Genchev
MF	11	(England) Dale Binns	(substituted off) 97'
FW	9	(England) Jake Baxter	(substituted off) 118'
FW	10	(England) Sam Murphy
FW	14	(England) Lewis Driver	(substituted off) 83'
Substitutes:
GK	13	(England) Lewis Gallifent
DF	2	(England) Lewis Jackson	(substituted on) 97'
DF	15	(England) Michael Kinsella
DF	16	(England) Danny Bennell
MF	8	(England) Dave Taylor	(substituted on) 79'
MF	17	(England) Andy Crossley	(substituted on) 83'
FW	12	(England) John Pomroy	(substituted on) 118'
Manager: (England) Dave Anderson

GK	1	(England) Andy Walker (c)
CB	6	(Turkey) Cem Tumkaya	(substituted off) 106'
CB	5	(England) Ashley Sains	(substituted off) 111'
CB	4	(England) Liam Hickey
RWB	23	(England) Denzel Gayle
LWB	3	(England) Danny Smith
RM	7	(England) Anthony Edgar
CM	8	(England) Paul Semakula
LM	11	(England) Ryan Flack	(substituted off) 72'
ST	10	(Jamaica) Kevin Lisbie	(substituted off) 100'
ST	9	(England) Gavin Tomlin
Substitutes:
GK	21	(Gibraltar) Deren Ibrahim
DF	2	(England) Brad Potter	(substituted on) 106'
DF	29	(England) Lea Dawson
MF	12	(England) Tyler Myers
MF	18	(England) Josh James	(substituted on) 72'
MF	27	(England) Francis Babalola	(substituted on) 100'
FW	33	(Saint Kitts and Nevis) Calum Willock	(substituted on) 111'
Manager: (England) Kevin Watson

Man of the match:

Match officials

- Assistant referees: Rob Smith & Matthew Lee
- Fourth official: Thomas Brammall

Match rules

- 90 minutes.
- 30 minutes of extra-time if necessary.
- Penalty shoot-out if scores still level.
- Seven named substitutes.
- Maximum of three substitutions.
- Fourth substitute allowed in extra-time.
