= Alex Mathie =

Scottish footballer and manager

Personal information
- Full name: Alexander Mathie
- Date of birth: 20 December 1968 (age 57)
- Place of birth: Bathgate, Scotland
- Height: 5 ft 10 in (1.78 m)
- Position: Forward

Youth career
- 1981–1987: Celtic Boys Club

Senior career*
Years	Team	Apps	(Gls)
1987–1991	Celtic	11	(0)
1991–1993	Morton	74	(31)
1993	→ Port Vale (loan)	3	(0)
1993–1995	Newcastle United	25	(4)
1995–1998	Ipswich Town	109	(38)
1998–2000	Dundee United	38	(5)
1999	→ Preston North End (loan)	12	(2)
2000–2003	York City	52	(3)
2003	Spennymoor		
2003	Pickering Town		
2003–2004	West Auckland Town		
2004–2007	Pickering Town		
Total		324	(83)

Managerial career
- 2003: Spennymoor United
- 2003–2004: West Auckland Town
- 2004–2007: Pickering Town
- * Club domestic league appearances and goals

Alexander Mathie (born 20 December 1968) is a Scottish football manager, former professional footballer and sports radio co-commentator.

He made over 200 appearances as a striker in a career that lasted from 1987 until 2007, notably playing in the Premier League with Newcastle United and Ipswich Town, and in the Scottish Premier League for Celtic and Dundee United. During his career, he also played for Morton and Preston North End before finishing his professional career with York City. He became player-manager of Spennymoor United in 2003. Still, this job lasted only a few months before he briefly returned to playing with non-League Pickering Town and then took over as player-manager of West Auckland Town. In 2004, he took the vacant managerial position at his former club, Pickering, and remained in this position until 2007.

== Club career ==
=== Celtic ===
Mathie graduated from Celtic Boys Club to turn professional with Celtic in May 1987. He made his first-team debut in a 2–1 home defeat to Motherwell on 11 February 1989. He made eleven appearances in the Premier Division in four seasons at Celtic Park. Under the stewardship of Billy McNeill, the "Bhoys" won the league title in 1987–88, before falling behind Old Firm rivals Rangers in 1988–89, 1989–90, and 1990–91.

=== Morton ===
Mathie joined Allan McGraw's Morton in the First Division in August 1991 in a £100,000 deal. He scored 23 goals in 1991–92 and 21 goals in 1992–93, to become the club's top-scorer for two consecutive seasons. He also played in the 1992 final of the Scottish Challenge Cup at Love Street, which ended in a 3–2 defeat to Hamilton Academical. He scored a hat-trick against Clydebank on 4 August 1992, and another hat-trick in a Scottish Challenge Cup match against Forfar Athletic on 29 September. He went on to have a short loan spell with Port Vale of the English Football League's Second Division. He made three appearances in April 1993, all of them as a substitute, and did not feature as John Rudge's "Valiants" went on to win promotion out of the play-offs.

=== Newcastle United ===
In July 1993, Mathie moved from Cappielow to Kevin Keegan's Newcastle United in a deal worth £250,000. He scored a "world class" goal on his debut in a 4–2 win over Sheffield Wednesday at St James' Park on 13 September. Unable to dislodge Peter Beardsley and Andy Cole from the starting line-up, he went on to make a further 15 Premier League appearances in 1993–94, all from the bench, and scored in wins over Coventry City and West Ham United. He started just four games in 1994–95 and scored another goal against West Ham before he was sold to George Burley's Ipswich Town in February 1995 for £500,000.

=== Ipswich Town ===
Mathie scored on his Ipswich debut in a 2–1 win against Southampton, one of only seven league wins that season as the "Blues" went on to be relegated out of the top-flight in 1994–95. Mathie played in the club's famous 9–0 defeat to Manchester United at Old Trafford on 4 March 1995. He scored 19 goals in 1995–96 to become the club's joint top-scorer (with Ian Marshall). His 18 First Division goals also made him the sixth-highest scorer. This tally included a hat-trick in a 3–0 win over Sunderland at Portman Road on 2 September. He hit nine goals in 17 appearances in 1996–97 but did not feature after picking up an injury in October. Mathie scored 16 goals in 45 games in the 1997–98 season, and hit a hat-trick in a 5–0 win over rivals Norwich City on 21 February. The "Tractor Boys" reached the play-offs, but were beaten over two legs by Charlton Athletic. Mathie scored twice in the opening ten games of the 1998–99 season before he was sold to Paul Sturrock's Dundee United for around £700,000 in October 1998.

=== Dundee United ===
He replaced the outgoing Robbie Winters, who had moved on to Aberdeen for around the same fee (plus Billy Dodds) a few weeks previously. Mathie scored just two goals in 28 games in the 1998–99 season and ended the season on the transfer list. He was loaned out to Preston North End for the early part of the 1999–2000 season. He scored four goals in 18 league and cup games during a three-month stay at Deepdale. Manager David Moyes went on to lead the "Lillywhites" to the Second Division title at the end of the campaign.

After returning to Dundee United, Mathie scored his first goal and only at Tannadice Park on 30 January 2000, in a 4–1 defeat of Airdrieonians in the Scottish Cup. As United's No. 9 he hit the net four times in 17 games that season, though this still left him fifth in the club's scoring charts. He played four games of the 2000–01 season; a 2–1 defeat to Celtic, 3–0 loss at Hibernian, 1–1 draw with Motherwell and 2–1 defeat by St Johnstone. He left the SPL in September 2000 after being released by new boss Alex Smith. Chairman Jim McLean later said that Mathie was "a complete disaster... a dreadful buy". Mathie in turn said that McLean's resignation "could be the best thing ever to happen to United", and that captain Jason de Vos could not be trusted, and also bemoaned the influx of foreign players at Tannadice.

=== Later career ===
Mathie joined Terry Dolan's York City on a free transfer in the English Third Division in September 2000. He scored twice in 24 appearances in 2000–01, and scored twice in 26 appearances in 2001–02. He featured ten times in 2002–03, without finding the net, and left both Bootham Crescent when his contract was cancelled in March 2003.

== International career ==
Mathie was a squad member for Scotland at the 1987 FIFA World Youth Championship. However, he remained on the bench for Scotland's four tournament games.

== Managerial career ==
In 2003, he spent time as Northern Premier League side Spennymoor United's player-manager, before moving on to Northern League club West Auckland Town. In 2004, he became player-manager of the Northern League side Pickering Town before he resigned in January 2007.

== Personal life ==
In July 2008, Mathie began working for BBC Radio Suffolk to provide match commentary and analysis for former side Ipswich, joining former players such as Bryan Hamilton and John Wark. Mathie has also played football for charity in his retirement. He later worked for Royal Mail, as a delivery office manager in the York and Leeds area.

== Career statistics ==
Appearances and goals by club, season and competition
Club	Season	League			National cup (Note: Includes Scottish Cup, FA Cup)		League cup (Note: Includes Scottish League Cup, Football League Cup)		Other		Total	
Club	Season	Division	Apps	Goals	Apps	Goals	Apps	Goals	Apps	Goals	Apps	Goals
Celtic	1987–88	Scottish Premier Division	0	0	0	0	0	0	0	0	0	0
Celtic	1988–89	Scottish Premier Division	1	0	0	0	0	0	0	0	1	0
Celtic	1989–90	Scottish Premier Division	6	0	1	0	0	0	0	0	7	0
Celtic	1990–91	Scottish Premier Division	4	0	0	0	0	0	0	0	4	0
Celtic	Total		11	0	1	0	0	0	0	0	12	0
Morton	1991–92	Scottish First Division	42	18	4	3	1	0	2	2	49	23
Morton	1992–93	Scottish First Division	32	13	1	0	1	1	5	7	39	21
Morton	Total		74	31	5	3	2	1	7	9	88	44
Port Vale (loan)	1992–93	Second Division	3	0	0	0	0	0	0	0	3	0
Newcastle United	1993–94	Premier League	16	3	0	0	1	0	—		17	3
Newcastle United	1994–95	Premier League	9	1	0	0	3	0	0	0	12	1
Newcastle United	Total		25	4	0	0	4	0	0	0	29	4
Ipswich Town	1994–95	Premier League	13	2	0	0	0	0	—		13	2
Ipswich Town	1995–96	First Division	39	18	2	0	1	0	4 (Note: Appearances in Anglo-Italian Cup)	1	46	19
Ipswich Town	1996–97	First Division	12	4	0	0	5	5	0	0	17	9
Ipswich Town	1997–98	First Division	37	13	2	0	5	2	2 (Note: Appearances in First Division Play-offs)	0	46	15
Ipswich Town	1998–99	First Division	8	1	0	0	2	1	0	0	10	2
Ipswich Town	Total		109	38	4	0	13	8	6	1	132	47
Dundee United	1998–99	Scottish Premier League	22	2	6	0	0	0	—		28	2
Dundee United	1999–2000	Scottish Premier League	12	3	3	1	2	0	—		17	4
Dundee United	2000–01	Scottish Premier League	4	0	0	0	1	0	—		5	0
Dundee United	Total		38	5	9	1	3	0	0	0	50	6
Preston North End (loan)	1999–2000	Second Division	12	2	3	0	2	2	1 (Note: Appearance in Football League Trophy)	0	18	4
York City	2000–01	Third Division	19	1	4	1	0	0	1	0	24	2
York City	2001–02	Third Division	23	2	2	0	0	0	1	0	26	2
York City	2002–03	Third Division	10	0	0	0	0	0	0	0	10	0
York City	Total		52	3	6	1	0	0	2	0	60	4
Career total			324	83	28	5	24	11	16	10	392	109

== Honours ==
Morton

- Scottish Challenge Cup runner-up: 1992
