= Mario Metushev =

Bulgarian footballer and convicted murderer (born 1979)

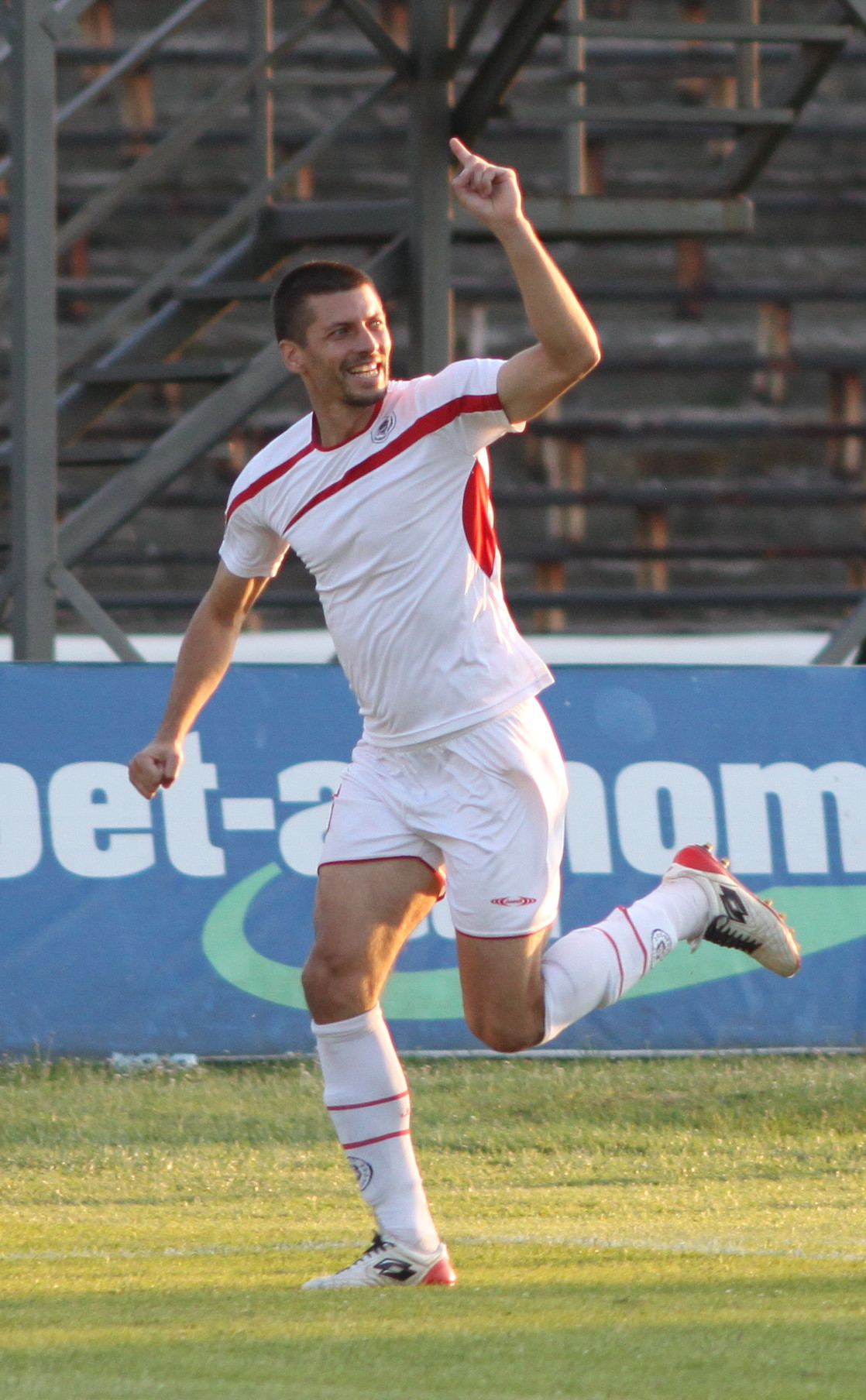

Personal information
- Full name: Mario Yuseinov Metushev
- Date of birth: 30 March 1979 (age 47)
- Place of birth: Gotse Delchev, Bulgaria
- Height: 1.88 m (6 ft 2 in)
- Position: Forward

Youth career
- 1982–1990: Pirin Gotse Delchev

Senior career*
Years	Team	Apps	(Gls)
1996–1997	Pirin Gotse Delchev	17	(6)
1997–2000	Velbazhd Kyustendil	35	(9)
1999	→ Botev Plovdiv (loan)	2	(0)
2000–2001	Cherno More	24	(5)
2001–2003	Chernomorets Burgas	37	(9)
2003–2005	Beroe Stara Zagora	38	(10)
2005–2006	Pas Gianina		
2006	Pirin Gotse Delchev		
2006–2009	Pirin Blagoevgrad		
2009	Kozani		
2009–2010	Pirin Gotse Delchev	13	(3)
2010	PAEEK FC		
2011	Pirin Gotse Delchev	13	(1)
2011	Bdin Vidin	10	(1)
2012–2014	Mesta Hadzhidimovo		
- * Club domestic league appearances and goals as of 15 November 2013

Mario Metushev (Bulgarian: Марио Метушев, born 30 March 1979) is a Bulgarian former professional footballer who played as a forward and convicted murderer. He was sentenced to 20 years in prison for the brutal murder of his childhood friend Krasimir Koldzhiev, age 42, on June 15, 2018. The pair was celebrating the popular Muslim festival Bayram in Koldzhiev's house when Metushev committed the murder. It is believed that Metushev suspected that his friend betrayed him to the police for illegally selling tobacco, for which Metushev spent time in custody. The murder was particularly brutal, with Metushev having stabbed the victim, who later died of blood loss, 97 times. Metushev experienced several mental breakdowns during court and in prison. He is believed to have suffered from severe psychological issues in the years leading to the murder. After the prosecutors protested against the initial court decision, the Sofia Court of Appeal sentenced Metushev to life in prison. The Bulgarian Supreme Court of Cassation confirmed the Court of Appeal's ruling on August 4, 2023, leaving the former football player without the possibility of parole or further appeal.
