= Phil Morgan (footballer) =

English footballer

Personal information
- Full name: Philip Jonathan Morgan
- Date of birth: 18 December 1974 (age 51)
- Place of birth: Stoke-on-Trent, England
- Position: Goalkeeper

Youth career
- 1990–1994: Ipswich Town

Senior career*
| Years | Team | Apps | (Gls) |
| 1994–1995 | Ipswich Town | 1 | (0) |
| 1995–1998 | Stoke City | 0 | (0) |
| 1995 | → Macclesfield Town (loan) | 6 | (0) |
| 1996 | → Macclesfield Town (loan) | 3 | (0) |
| 1996 | → Chesterfield (loan) | 2 | (0) |
| 1996 | → Macclesfield Town (loan) | 5 | (0) |
| 1997 | → Halifax Town (loan) | 1 | (0) |
| 1998 | → Hednesford Town (loan) | 0 | (0) |
| 1998 | Macclesfield Town | 0 | (0) |
| 1998–1999 | Hednesford Town | 48 | (0) |
| 1999–2002 | Southport | 1 | (0) |
| Total | | 67 | (0) |
- * Club domestic league appearances and goals

Philip Jonathan Morgan (born 18 December 1974) is an English former professional footballer who played as a goalkeeper.

== Career ==
Morgan was born in Stoke-on-Trent and began his career with Premier League side Ipswich Town signing a Youth Training Scheme in 1990. He played one league match for Ipswich which came in a 2–0 defeat against Leicester City towards the end of the 1994–95 season with the side already relegated. He returned to his home city at the end of the campaign and joined Stoke City. He failed to break into the first team at Stoke and spent time out on loan at Chesterfield, Hednesford Town and three spells at Macclesfield Town. He went on to play for non-league sides Hednesford Town and Southport.

== Career statistics ==
Appearances and goals by club, season and competition
| Club | Season | League | | | FA Cup | | League Cup | | Other | | Total | |
| Club | Season | Division | Apps | Goals | Apps | Goals | Apps | Goals | Apps | Goals | Apps | Goals |
|---|---|---|---|---|---|---|---|---|---|---|---|---|
| Ipswich Town | 1994–95 | Premier League | 1 | 0 | 0 | 0 | 0 | 0 | 0 | 0 | 1 | 0 |
| Stoke City | 1995–96 | First Division | 0 | 0 | 0 | 0 | 0 | 0 | 0 | 0 | 0 | 0 |
| Macclesfield Town (loan) | 1995–96 | Football Conference | 9 | 0 | 0 | 0 | 0 | 0 | 1 | 0 | 10 | 0 |
| Macclesfield Town (loan) | 1996–97 | Football Conference | 5 | 0 | 0 | 0 | 0 | 0 | 3 | 0 | 8 | 0 |
| Macclesfield Town (loan) | Total | | 14 | 0 | 0 | 0 | 0 | 0 | 4 | 0 | 18 | 0 |
| Chesterfield (loan) | 1996–97 | Second Division | 2 | 0 | 0 | 0 | 0 | 0 | 0 | 0 | 2 | 0 |
| Halifax Town (loan) | 1996–97 | Football Conference | 1 | 0 | 0 | 0 | 0 | 0 | 0 | 0 | 1 | 0 |
| Macclesfield Town | 1998–99 | Second Division | 0 | 0 | 0 | 0 | 0 | 0 | 0 | 0 | 0 | 0 |
| Southport | 1996–97 | Football Conference | 1 | 0 | 0 | 0 | 0 | 0 | 0 | 0 | 1 | 0 |
| Career total | | | 18 | 0 | 0 | 0 | 0 | 0 | 4 | 0 | 22 | 0 |
