= Lyubomir Genchev =

Bulgarian footballer

Lyubomir Genchev Любомир Генчев
Personal information
- Full name: Lyubomir Bonchev Genchev
- Date of birth: 13 April 1986 (age 40)
- Place of birth: Veliko Tarnovo, Bulgaria
- Height: 1.81 m (5 ft 11 in)
- Positions: Midfielder; winger

Team information
- Current team: Yantra Polski Trambesh
- Number: 7

Youth career
- 1998–2003: Chelsea
- 2003–2004: Queens Park Rangers
- 2004–2005: Ipswich Town

Senior career*
Years	Team	Apps	(Gls)
2006	Union Berlin	2	(0)
2006–2007	Naftex Burgas		
2007–2011	Hendon	117	(17)
2011–2012	Lowestoft Town	35	(8)
2012	Lyubimets 2007	1	(0)
2013–2015	Lokomotiv GO	68	(34)
2015	Montana	3	(0)
2016	Etar Veliko Tarnovo	9	(6)
2016–2017	Lokomotiv GO	18	(0)
2017–2018	Yantra Polski Trambesh		
2018–2020	Chertsey Town		
2020–	Yantra Polski Trambesh	66+	(42+)
- * Club domestic league appearances and goals as of 07:46, 29 November 2024 (UTC)

Lyubomir Genchev (Bulgarian: Любомир Генчев; born 13 April 1986) is a Bulgarian professional footballer who plays as a midfielder. He is son of former footballer Boncho Genchev.

== Career ==
Genchev returned to Lokomotiv Gorna Oryahovitsa for the 2016–17 season but was released in September 2017.

=== Honours ===
Chertsey Town

- FA Vase: 2018-19
