= Borislav Pavlov =

Bulgarian footballer

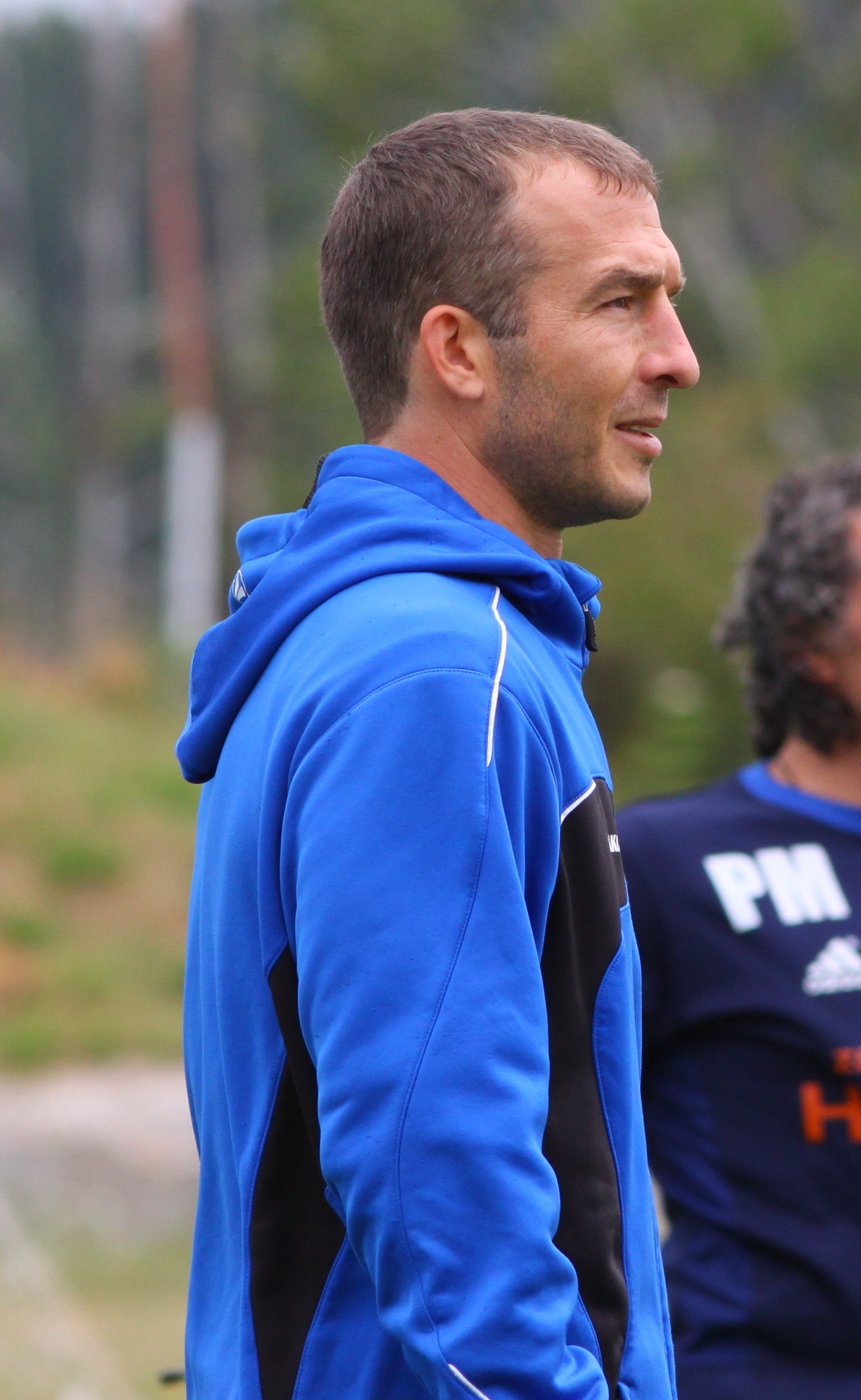

Personal information
- Full name: Borislav Petrov Pavlov
- Date of birth: 6 January 1978 (age 48)
- Place of birth: Sandanski, Bulgaria
- Height: 1.79 m (5 ft 10 in)
- Position: Defender

Team information
- Current team: Slivnishki geroi
- Number: 26

Youth career
- CSKA Sofia

Senior career*
Years	Team	Apps	(Gls)
1999–2000	Velbazhd Kyustendil	12	(0)
2000–2001	Cherno More	16	(0)
2002–2004	Velbazhd Kyustendil		
2004–2006	Spartak Pleven	37	(6)
2006–2008	Slavia Sofia	50	(3)
2009–2010	Vihren Sandanski	33	(0)
2010	Chernomorets Balchik	14	(1)
2011–	Slivnishki Geroi		
- * Club domestic league appearances and goals as of 31 May 2010

Borislav Pavlov (Bulgarian: Борислав Павлов) (born 6 January 1978) is a Bulgarian football midfielder who plays for Slivnishki Geroi. He is a central defender or defensive midfielder.

He had previously played for CSKA Sofia, Spartak Pleven and Slavia Sofia.
