= 1991–92 B Group =

Season of the Bulgarian B Football Group

Bulgarian B Group
- Season: 1991–92
- Champions: Haskovo
- Promoted: Haskovo; Spartak Varna
- Relegated: Chavdar Byala Slatina; Pavlikeni; Velbazhd Kyustendil; Chumerna Elena
- Matches: 380
- Goals: 965 (2.54 per match)
- Top goalscorer: (Bulgaria) Simeon Krastev (22 goals)

The 1991–92 B Group was the 36th season of the Bulgarian B Football Group, the second tier of the Bulgarian football league system. A total of 19 teams contested the league.

== League table ==
Pos	Team	Pld	W	D	L	GF	GA	GD	Pts	Promotion or relegation
1	Haskovo (P)	38	19	10	9	55	32	+23	48	Promotion to 1992–93 A Group
2	Spartak Varna (P)	38	18	11	9	73	48	+25	47	Promotion to 1992–93 A Group
3	Neftochimic Burgas	38	20	6	12	65	32	+33	46	
4	Akademik Svishtov	38	17	12	9	60	37	+23	46	
5	Dorostol Silistra	38	18	7	13	56	39	+17	43	
6	Dunav Ruse	38	15	10	13	51	43	+8	40	
7	LEX Lovech	38	14	12	12	49	42	+7	40	
8	Spartak Pleven	38	17	6	15	49	46	+3	40	
9	Botev Vratsa	38	14	11	13	51	39	+12	39	
10	Rozova Dolina Kazanlak	38	16	7	15	46	42	+4	39	
11	Cherno More Varna	38	15	9	14	45	42	+3	39	
12	Montana	38	14	10	14	48	44	+4	38	
13	Shumen	38	13	12	13	41	38	+3	38	
14	Belasitsa Petrich	38	17	4	17	48	50	−2	38	
15	Slanchev Bryag Nesebar	38	14	9	15	48	58	−10	37	
16	Svetkavitsa Targovishte	38	13	10	15	39	39	0	36	
17	Chavdar Byala Slatina (R)	38	15	6	17	46	56	−10	36	Relegation to 1992–93 V Group
18	Pavlikeni (R)	38	15	1	22	43	63	−20	31	Relegation to 1992–93 V Group
19	Velbazhd Kyustendil (R)	38	10	10	18	34	57	−23	30	Relegation to 1992–93 V Group
20	Chumerna Elena (R)	38	3	3	32	18	118	−100	9	Relegation to 1992–93 V Group

Source: todor66.com
Rules for classification: 1) points; 2) goal difference; 3) number of goals scored.
(P) Promoted; (R) Relegated
