= Kaloyan Chakarov =

Bulgarian footballer

Personal information
- Full name: Kaloyan Stefanov Chakarov
- Date of birth: 17 February 1971 (age 55)
- Place of birth: Veliko Tarnovo, Bulgaria
- Height: 1.84 m (6 ft 0 in)
- Position: Goalkeeper

Youth career
- Etar

Senior career*
| Years | Team | Apps | (Gls) |
| 1990–1998 | Etar | | |
| 1993 | → Korabostroitel (loan) | 11 | (0) |
| 1998–1999 | Maritsa Plovdiv | | |
| 1999–2000 | Cherno More | 31 | (0) |
| 2001–2002 | Civitanovese | 29 | (0) |
| 2002–2003 | Sangiustese | 14 | (0) |
| 2003–2004 | Tortoli Calcio | 11 | (0) |
| 2004–2005 | Lotzorai | | |
| 2005–2007 | Tortoli Calcio | 5 | (0) |
| 2007–2008 | Baunese | | |
| 2008–2009 | Nuorese | 4 | (0) |
- * Club domestic league appearances and goals

Kaloyan Chakarov (Bulgarian: Калоян Чакъров; born 17 February 1971) is a former Bulgarian professional footballer who played as a goalkeeper.

== Early life ==
Chakarov was born Bulgaria to Bulgarian footballer Stefan Chakarov.

== Career ==
Chakarov started his career with Bulgarian side Etar, helping the club win their first league title.

== Personal life ==
Chakarov has been married and has lived and worked in Italy after retiring from professional football.
