= Gus Uhlenbeek =

Dutch footballer (born 1970)

Personal information
- Full name: Gustaaf Reinier Uhlenbeek
- Place of birth: Paramaribo, Suriname
- Position: Right back

Senior career*
Years	Team	Apps	(Gls)
1990–1992	Ajax	2	(0)
1992–1994	Cambuur	39	(0)
1994–1995	TOP Oss	22	(3)
1995–1998	Ipswich Town	94	(4)
1998–2000	Fulham	39	(1)
2000–2002	Sheffield United	50	(0)
2002	→ Walsall (loan)	5	(0)
2002–2003	Bradford City	42	(1)
2003–2004	Chesterfield	37	(0)
2004–2005	Wycombe Wanderers	42	(4)
2005–2006	Mansfield Town	40	(2)
2006–2007	Halifax Town	30	(3)
Total		442	(18)
- * Club domestic league appearances and goals

Gustaaf (Gus / Guus) Reinier Uhlenbeek (born 20 August 1970) is a Dutch former footballer. He was born in Paramaribo in the former Dutch colony Suriname, but grew up in Amsterdam. Uhlenbeek spent more than a decade in English football, and was released by Halifax Town at the end of the 2006–07 season.

== Career ==
Uhlenbeek plays on the right side of midfield, or as a right-back. He began his career at Ajax, but only played twice for the first team and left the club in 1992. He later played first division football for Cambuur and TOP Oss, before joining English side Ipswich in 1995.

In his first two seasons at Portman Road, Uhlenbeek was a regular, but he lost his place in the team, and joined Fulham in 1998. After two years at Fulham and one goal against Wrexham, he joined Sheffield United in 2000. He spent two seasons at Bramall Lane, where he gained something of a cult status, before later playing for Walsall, Bradford City (scoring once against Rotherham), Chesterfield and Wycombe Wanderers. After being released by Wycombe in the summer of 2005, he joined Mansfield Town.

Uhlenbeek had a fine but somewhat inconsistent season at Mansfield, where he was one of the few veterans in an otherwise very young team. His contract expired at the end of the 2005–06 season, and Uhlenbeek was subsequently released. After his release, he joined Halifax Town, where he spent a year.

== Honours ==
Fulham

- Football League Second Division: 1998–99
