= Craig Forrest =

Canadian soccer player and commentator

Personal information
- Full name: Craig Lorne Forrest
- Date of birth: 20 September 1967 (age 59)
- Place of birth: Coquitlam, British Columbia, Canada
- Height: 1.96 m (6 ft 5 in)
- Position: Goalkeeper

Youth career
- Coquitlam Bel-Aire City

Senior career*
Years	Team	Apps	(Gls)
1985–1997	Ipswich Town	263	(0)
1987–1988	→ Colchester United (loan)	11	(0)
1997	→ Chelsea (loan)	3	(0)
1997–2002	West Ham United	30	(0)
Total		307	(0)

International career
1988–2002	Canada	56	(0)
Medal record
Representing Canada
Men's soccer
CONCACAF Gold Cup
Winner	2000 United States
North American Nations Cup
Winner	1990 Canada
- * Club domestic league appearances and goals

Craig Lorne Forrest (born 20 September 1967) is a Canadian former professional soccer player and sports commentator.

As a player, he was a goalkeeper from 1985 until 2002, playing his entire career in England. He made Premier League appearances for Ipswich Town, Chelsea and West Ham United, whilst also spending time on loan in the Football League with Colchester United. He made 56 international appearances, representing Canada. In 2012 as part of the Canadian Soccer Association's centennial celebration, he was named to the all-time Canada XI men's team.

== Early life ==
Born and raised in British Columbia, Forrest began playing football at age 12. He first tried goalkeeping when a friend could not make it to a game and he decided to play as a replacement. He began playing with Coquitlam Bel-Aire City and also played for the BC U-16 and U-18 provincial teams. He was scouted by scouts from England and, in 1984, he travelled to England, signing a two-year apprenticeship deal with Ipswich Town at the age of 17 and soon after was training with the English national youth team.

== Club career ==
=== Ipswich Town ===
Forrest joined English league side Ipswich Town in 1984 and remained with the club until 1997, making 263 league appearances. Forrest saw his first first-team action with 11 appearances on loan to Colchester United in the 1987–88 season. From 1988 to 1989 through to 1996–97, Forrest was in the Ipswich Town goal, including during the 1991–92 season when the club won promotion to the newly established Premier League by winning the old Football League Second Division. Forrest was ever-present that season. He was also one of only 13 foreign players to play on the opening weekend of the FA Premier League along with John Jensen, Jan Stejskal, Anders Limpar, Peter Schmeichel, Andrei Kanchelskis, Robert Warzycha, Eric Cantona, Ronnie Rosenthal, Michel Vonk, Gunnar Halle, Roland Nilsson and Hans Segers. He was the goalkeeper for what was then the heaviest Premiership defeat in history when Ipswich lost 9–0 to Manchester United at Old Trafford in March 1995.

His goalkeeping helped Ipswich beat United (then in the early years of their period of dominance of English football) on one occasion in the first three seasons of the Premier League in a 3–2 victory there in September 1994 - as well as holding them to draws at Old Trafford in August 1992 and November 1993 - on the latter occasion he ensured that Ipswich were one of just three sides who visited United in the league without conceding a goal that season. He was voted Goalkeeper of the Month in the Premier League for October 1994, and around this time an offer of around £2 million from an unnamed club for Forrest's services was rejected by Ipswich. He remained loyal to the club despite their relegation at the end of that season, and stayed there for another two seasons.

Forrest went on loan to Chelsea from Ipswich in 1997, playing in the same team with the likes of Gianluca Vialli and Gianfranco Zola under the guidance of manager Ruud Gullit. A permanent move to Chelsea was turned down by the Ipswich Board of Directors.

=== West Ham United ===
Forrest signed for West Ham United in the summer of 1997 for £500,000. Forrest played a number of first-team games in the FA Premier League in the late 1990s and early 2000s with the east Londoners, remaining at Boleyn Ground until his retirement from football in 2002. On 1 April 2000 he was again the goalkeeper for a big defeat by Manchester United. Although West Ham scored first, the game finished 7–1 to Manchester United. In 2001, Forrest was diagnosed with testicular cancer. He beat the disease, but was advised by his doctors that he would no longer be able to play, culminating in Forrest retiring in 2002.

== International career ==
Forrest played at the 1987 FIFA U-20 World Cup and made his debut for the Canada senior team in a May 1988 friendly match against Chile. He earned 56 caps (excluding the May 1990 North American Championship match against the US), the most of any goalkeeper in the national team's history tied with Pat Onstad and earned the most clean sheets in the country's history before retiring from international football in 2002. The highlight of his international career was undoubtedly helping Canada win the 2000 CONCACAF Gold Cup, in which Forrest was named tournament MVP and Most Valuable Goalkeeper for allowing a mere three goals and stopping two penalties in his side's five games. Also during his international career Canada had secured a 1–1 draw against Brazil only a month prior to the World Cup in the US in 1994. Forrest had further success against Brazil in 2001, recording a clean sheet in a 0–0 draw in the 2001 Confederations Cup in Japan. In 2012, Forrest was voted by the fans into the Canadian best XI in the CSA's first 100 years.

== Media career ==
Forrest began working as a sports analyst with Rogers Sportsnet (now Sportsnet) upon his retirement from playing. He appears frequently as a broadcaster for the men's national team and Toronto FC on Sportsnet as well as Sportsnet's Soccer Central Matchday. Forrest is now the Canadian FIFA Ambassador for SOS Children's Villages. He was a commentator for the 2026 FIFA World Cup.

== Honours ==
Ipswich Town

- Football League Second Division: 1991–92

West Ham United

- UEFA Intertoto Cup: 1999

Canada

- CONCACAF Gold Cup: 2000
- North American Nations Cup: 1990

Individual

- Canada Soccer Player of the Year: 1994, 2000
- Ipswich Town Player of the Year: 1994–95
- Ipswich Town Players' Player of the Year: 1994–95
- CONCACAF Gold Cup Best Player: 2000
- CONCACAF Gold Cup Most Valuable Player: 2000
- CONCACAF Gold Cup Most Valuable Goalkeeper: 2000
- Aubrey Sanford Meritorious Service Award: 2005
- CONCACAF Gold Cup Best XI: 2000
- Canadian Soccer Hall of Fame: Inducted 2007
- Order of Sport, Canada's Sports Hall of Fame: Inducted 2015
