= Kevin Ellis (footballer, born 1977) =

English footballer

Personal information
- Full name: Kevin Edward Ellis
- Date of birth: 11 May 1977 (age 49)
- Place of birth: Tiptree, England
- Position: Defender

Senior career*
Years	Team	Apps	(Gls)
1993–1997	Ipswich Town	1	(0)
- King's Lynn
Total		1	(0)
- * Club domestic league appearances and goals

Kevin Ellis (born 11 May 1977) is an English football defender.
