= Boncho Genchev =

Bulgarian footballer

Personal information
- Full name: Boncho Lyubomirov Genchev
- Date of birth: 7 July 1964 (age 62)
- Place of birth: General Toshevo, Bulgaria
- Height: 1.80 m (5 ft 11 in)
- Position: Attacking midfielder

Youth career
- 1974–1981: Sportist General Toshevo

Senior career*
Years	Team	Apps	(Gls)
1981–1982	Dobrudzha Dobrich	6	(0)
1982–1983	Osam Lovech	18	(2)
1983–1986	Lokomotiv GO	85	(13)
1987–1991	Etar	115	(37)
1991–1992	Sporting CP	2	(0)
1992–1995	Ipswich Town	61	(6)
1995–1997	Luton Town	66	(10)
1997–1998	CSKA Sofia	32	(20)
1999–2001	Hendon	52	(9)
2001–2002	Carshalton Athletic	11	(1)
2006–2007	Hendon	18	(0)
Total		493	(114)

International career
1990–1996	Bulgaria	12	(0)

Managerial career
- 2016: Etar Veliko Tarnovo
- * Club domestic league appearances and goals

Boncho Lyubomirov Genchev (Bulgarian: Бончо Любомиров Генчев; born 7 July 1964) is a Bulgarian retired professional footballer who played as an attacking midfielder, and a current manager.

He started in his home country in the lower leagues before moving to Lokomotiv Gorna and Etar. After one year in Portugal with Sporting, he went to England in 1992 and played in the Premier League with Ipswich Town and in the Football League for Luton Town.

After a short spell in Bulgaria with CSKA Sofia, he played non-league football in England during three years, for Hendon and Carshalton Athletic.

Genchev appeared with Bulgaria at the 1994 World Cup and Euro 1996 tournaments.

== Club career ==
Born in General Toshevo, Dobrich Province, Genchev started playing with PFC Dobrudzha Dobrich, switching to PFC Litex Lovech in 1982 for another sole season. In the following year he established himself in the Bulgarian A Football Group, with FC Lokomotiv Gorna Oryahovitsa and F.C. Etar, where he played three 1/2 and four 1/2 years respectively.

After 22 league goals for Etar in two seasons combined, 27-year-old Genchev moved abroad, signing with Sporting Clube de Portugal in the summer of 1991 alongside compatriot Ivaylo Yordanov, who previously had succeeded him at Lokomotiv GO. Unlike the forward, he had virtually no impact with the Lisbon side, leaving after one sole season and two Primeira Liga matches.

Genchev revived his career in England, where he played for Ipswich Town and Luton Town, his three years with the Blues being spent in the Premier League (with relegation in the last one), where he netted a total of six times. He then signed for Luton Town, who were relegated from Division One in his first season there, and were beaten in the Division Two playoff semi-finals in his second season.

In 1997, after five years in England, Genchev returned to his country, with PFC CSKA Sofia, winning the top scorer accolade in his debut campaign — although the club could only finish third – and the Bulgarian Cup in his second. After that, he returned, at nearly 35, to England, playing non-league football for Hendon FC and Carshalton Athletic, and retiring three years after.

Four years later, Genchev came out of retirement and rejoined Hendon, scoring his first goal in his second spell on 14 March 2007 against Hayes FC, in the Middlesex Senior Cup. He retired for good in the following year, later going on to work for Ipswich as an international ambassador.

In 2016, Genchev become the new manager of OFC Etar Veliko Tarnovo, but on 7 March of that year he was announced as chairman of the zonal council of the Bulgarian Football Union in the city.

== International career ==
During six years, Genchev played 12 times for Bulgaria, without scoring. He represented the nation at the 1994 FIFA World Cup, replacing Nasko Sirakov for the second half of the round-of-16 match against Mexico and scoring in his penalty shootout attempt.

Genchev was also picked for the squad at UEFA Euro 1996, playing one minute in the 1–0 group stage win against Romania.

== Personal life ==
After his first retirement, Genchev ran a café/bar in West Kensington, London called 'Strikers', but it ceased trading shortly afterwards.

Two of his sons, Lyubomir and Yavor, played for Lowestoft Town in the Isthmian League, and later joined their father at OFC Etar Veliko Tarnovo.

== Honours ==
Etar

- Bulgarian A Football Group: 1990–91

Bulgaria

- FIFA World Cup fourth place: 1994

Individual

- Bulgarian A Football Group: Top scorer 1997–98
