= Lee Norfolk =

New Zealand footballer

Personal information
- Full name: Lee Richard Norfolk
- Date of birth: 17 October 1975 (age 51)
- Place of birth: Dunedin, New Zealand
- Height: 5 ft 8 in (1.73 m)
- Position: Midfielder

Senior career*
Years	Team	Apps	(Gls)
1994–1997	Ipswich Town	4	(0)
1997–1998	North Shore United	26	(3)
1998	Cambridge City	1	(0)
1998	King's Lynn	20	(1)
1998	Cambridge City	10	
1998	Woodbridge Town	2	
1998	Bishop's Stortford	15	
1998–1999	Sudbury Wanderers	28	
1999–2005	A.F.C. Sudbury	268	(55)
2005	Halstead Town	8	(1)
2005–2006	Needham Market	26	(4)
2006–2007	Halstead Town	36	(0)
2007–2008	Diss Town	8	(1)
2008–2009	Stanway Rovers		
2009–2010	Felixstowe & Walton United		
2010–2012	Leiston		
2012–2015	Needham Market		
Total		357	(62)

International career^{‡}
1991	New Zealand U17		
- * Club domestic league appearances and goals as of 22:00, 30 December 2019 (UTC) ‡ National team caps and goals as of 22:00, 30 December 2019 (UTC)

Lee Norfolk (born 17 October 1975 in Dunedin) is a New Zealand footballer who represented his country at junior level, scoring one goal in a 3-0 win over Fiji in Napier in 1991.

He was the first New Zealander to sign a professional contract at a Premier league club and first to play in the FA Premier League. After graduating from the Ipswich Town youth team, he made 4 appearances for the first team, the first of which was at home to Southampton in the FA Premier League on 25 February 1995.

Norfolk went back to his native New Zealand for a period with North Shore United before returning to England where he played for Sudbury, Needham, Halstead and Diss Town. Norfolk coaches Leiston FC who have won 3 championships in 3 years.

In the latter days of his playing career, Norfolk played for Leiston and had a second spell with Needham Market.

He has been an Ipswich town academy Coach for several years. He was player coach for Leiston during their Steps 5 and 4 double promotion and became caretaker manager. He moved to Needham Market as first team coach where they won the championship and promotion to step 3 football. He became first team coach at Stowmarket then took up the role of assistant manager at step 4 club AFC Sudbury. He is currently first team coach at step 3 club Leiston FC who play in the southern premier central league.
