= FA Youth Cup Finals of the 1970s =

List of English football matches

FA Youth Cup Finals from 1970 to 1979.

== 1978–79: Millwall v. Manchester City (0–0 and 2–0, 2–0 aggregate) ==
Note: Flags indicate national team as defined under FIFA eligibility rules; some limited exceptions apply. Players may hold more than one non-FIFA nationality.

Millwall
No.	Pos.	Nation	Player
—	GK	ENG	Peter Gleasure
—	GK	ENG	John Helps
—	DF	ENG	David Martin
—	DF	ENG	Phil Coleman
—	DF	ENG	Ian Gale
—	DF	ENG	David Gregory
—	DF	ENG	Paul Roberts
—	DF	ENG	Paul Robinson
—	MF	ENG	Andy Massey
—	MF	ENG	Chris Dibble
—	MF	ENG	Dave Mehmet
—	MF	IRL	Tony Kinsella
—	MF	IRL	Kevin O'Callaghan
—	FW	SCO	Alan McKenna
—	FW	ENG	Dean Horrix
—	DF	ENG	Tony Dark
—	DF	ENG	David Hockley
—	FW	ENG	Wayne Shepherd

Manchester City
No.	Pos.	Nation	Player
1	GK	ENG	Alex Williams
2	DF	ENG	Gary Fitzgerald
3	DF	ENG	Dick Cunningham
4	DF	ENG	Nicky Reid
5	DF	ENG	Tommy Caton
6	MF	ENG	Ross McGinn
7	MF	ENG	McClure
8	MF	ENG	Leigh
9	MF	ENG	Clive Wilson
10	FW	ENG	Steve Kinsey
11	FW	ENG	Kevin Glendon

== 1977–78: Crystal Palace v. Aston Villa (1–0) ==
- On April 27, 1978, the FA Youth Cup Final was played at Highbury over only one leg.

Attendance:4,962 Note: Flags indicate national team as defined under FIFA eligibility rules; some limited exceptions apply. Players may hold more than one non-FIFA nationality.

Crystal Palace
No.	Pos.	Nation	Player
1	GK	ENG	David Fry
2	DF	ENG	Chris Sparks
3	DF	ENG	Kevin Dare
4	DF	ENG	Terry Fenwick
5	DF	ENG	Billy Gilbert
6	MF	WAL	Peter Nicholas
7	FW	ENG	Les Carter
8	MF	IRL	Jerry Murphy
9	FW	WAL	Steve Lovell
10	MF	ENG	Steve MacKenzie
11	FW	ENG	Vince Hilaire
sub	DF	ENG	Neil Banfield

Aston Villa
No.	Pos.	Nation	Player
1	GK	ENG	Mark Kendall
2	DF	ENG	Neil Morgan
3	DF	ENG	Colin Gibson
4	DF	ENG	Gary Williams
5	DF	ENG	Brendan Ormsby
6	MF	SCO	Ian Hendry
7	MF	ENG	Lee Jenkins
8	FW	SCO	John Capaldi
9	FW	ENG	Ivor Linton
10	FW	ENG	Adrian O'Dowd
11	FW	ENG	Gary Shaw
sub		ENG	Alan Ollis

- Scorer for Crystal Palace; Terry Fenwick.

== 1976–77: Crystal Palace v. Everton (1–0 aggregate) ==
Note: Flags indicate national team as defined under FIFA eligibility rules; some limited exceptions apply. Players may hold more than one non-FIFA nationality.

Crystal Palace
No.	Pos.	Nation	Player
1	GK	ENG	David Fry
2	DF	ENG	Terry Fenwick
3	DF	ENG	Kenny Sansom
4	DF	ENG	Billy Gilbert
5	MF	IRL	Jerry Murphy
6	MF	ENG	Steve Brennan
7	MF	WAL	Peter Nicholas
8	FW	WAL	Steve Lovell
9	FW	ENG	Vince Hilaire
10	FW	ENG	Steve Leahy

Everton
No.	Pos.	Nation	Player
1	DF	SCO	Billy Russell
2	DF	ENG	Ray Deakin
3	DF	WAL	Kevin Ratcliffe
4	DF	ENG	Mark Higgins
5	MF	ENG	Steve McMahon
6	FW	SCO	Ross Jack
7	FW	SCO	Joe McBride

- Scorer for Crystal Palace; Terry Fenwick.

== 1975–76: West Bromwich Albion v. Wolverhampton Wanderers (2–0 and 3–0, 5–0 aggregate) ==
Note: Flags indicate national team as defined under FIFA eligibility rules; some limited exceptions apply. Players may hold more than one non-FIFA nationality.

West Bromwich Albion
No.	Pos.	Nation	Player
1	GK	ENG	Mark Grew
2	DF	ENG	Tony Cooper
3	DF	ENG	Derek Statham
4	DF	ENG	John Loveridge
5	DF	ENG	Brian Clarke
6	MF	WAL	Martyn Davies
7	MF	ENG	Steve Lynex
8	MF	ENG	Colin Gregson
9	FW	WAL	Mark Trenter
10	FW	WAL	Wayne Hughes
11	MF	ENG	Kevin Summerfield
Sub	MF	ENG	Derek Hood

Wolverhampton Wanderers
No.	Pos.	Nation	Player
1	GK	ENG	Tony Walker
2	DF	ENG	Mark Duncombe
3	DF	ENG	Gary Tysall
4	MF	ENG	Paul Moss
5	DF	ENG	Bob Hazell
6	DF	WAL	George Berry
7	MF	ENG	Chindha Singh
8	MF	ENG	Martin Patching
9	FW	ENG	Steve Crompton
10	FW	ENG	Ken Todd
11	MF	SCO	John Black
Sub		ENG	Martin Loftus

== 1974–75: Ipswich Town v. West Ham United (3–1 and 2–0, 5–1 aggregate) ==
=== First leg ===
21 April 1975

West Ham United	1–3	Ipswich Town
Sharpe 51'		Bertschin; O'Neill; Geddis 87'

Upton Park, London
Attendance: 10,227
Referee: John Hunting

=== Second leg ===
30 April 1975

Ipswich Town	2–0	West Ham United
O'Neill; Bertschin

Portman Road, Ipswich
Attendance: 16,247
Referee: John Hunting

Note: Flags indicate national team as defined under FIFA eligibility rules; some limited exceptions apply. Players may hold more than one non-FIFA nationality.

Ipswich Town
No.	Pos.	Nation	Player
—	MF	SCO	John Wark
—	FW	ENG	Keith Bertschin
—	FW	ENG	David Geddis
—	MF	SCO	Tommy O'Neill

West Ham United
No.	Pos.	Nation	Player
1	GK	ENG	David Danson
2		ENG	Chris Smith
3		ENG	Tony Tuddenham (Capt.)
4		ENG	Derek Fraser
5	DF	ENG	Alvin Martin
6		ENG	John Domfe
7		ENG	Malcolm Hill
8	MF	ENG	Alan Curbishley
9		ENG	Terry Sharpe
10	FW	ENG	Geoff Pike
11	MF	ENG	Paul Brush
Sub	MF	ENG	Terry Hurlock

== 1973–74: Tottenham v. Huddersfield Town (1–1 and 1–0, 2–1 aggregate) ==
Note: Flags indicate national team as defined under FIFA eligibility rules; some limited exceptions apply. Players may hold more than one non-FIFA nationality.

Tottenham Hotspur
No.	Pos.	Nation	Player
1	GK	ENG	Ian Cranstone
2	DF	ENG	Ian Smith
3	DF	ENG	Micky Stead
4	DF	ENG	Andy Keeley
5	DF	WAL	Wayne Cegielski
6	MF	ENG	Gary Anderson
7	MF	NIR	Noel Brotherston
8	MF	SCO	Neil McNab
9	FW	ENG	Chris Jones
10	FW	ENG	Roger Gibbins
11	MF	ENG	John Margerrison

Huddersfield Town
No.	Pos.	Nation	Player
1	GK	ENG	Dick Taylor
2	DF	SCO	Alan Sweeney
3	DF	ENG	Paul Garner
4	DF	ENG	Stephen Barrett
5	DF	ENG	Peter Hart
6	MF	ENG	Martin Fowler
7	MF	ENG	Lloyd Maitland
8	FW	ENG	Bob Mountain
9	FW	ENG	Bob Newton
10	FW	ENG	Dave Nicholls
11	MF	ENG	Francis Firth
sub		ENG	Paul Cooper

== 1972–73: Ipswich Town v. Bristol City (3–0 and 1–1, 4–1 aggregate) ==
=== First leg ===
9 April 1973

Ipswich Town	3–0	Bristol City
Vale 15', 66'; Turner 90'

Portman Road, Ipswich
Attendance: 5,556
Referee: Roger Kirkpatrick

Note: Flags indicate national team as defined under FIFA eligibility rules; some limited exceptions apply. Players may hold more than one non-FIFA nationality.

Ipswich Town
No.	Pos.	Nation	Player
1	GK	SCO	David McKellar
2	DF	SCO	George Burley
3	DF	WAL	Les Tibbott
4	DF	ENG	John Stirk
5	DF	ENG	Gary Russo
6	DF	ENG	John Peddelty
7	MF	ENG	Tommy Parkin
8	MF	ENG	Eric Gates
9	FW	ENG	Robin Turner
10	FW	ENG	Steve Vale
11	MF	SCO	Kenny Taylor
Sub	DF	ENG	Dale Roberts

Bristol City
No.	Pos.	Nation	Player
1	GK	ENG	Bob Wardle
2	MF	ENG	Martyn Rogers
3	DF		Billy Milne
4	DF	ENG	Steve Harding
5	DF		Paul Crowley
6	DF		David Brown
7	DF		Paul Sneddon
8	MF	ENG	Gary Collier
9	FW	ENG	Colin Lee
10	FW		Kevin Prue
11	MF		Vivian Fear
Sub	MF	SCO	John Bain

=== Second leg ===
16 April 1973

Bristol City	1–1	Ipswich Town
Rogers 90'		Peddlety 14'

Ashton Gate, Bristol
Attendance: 6,032
Referee: Roger Kirkpatrick

Note: Flags indicate national team as defined under FIFA eligibility rules; some limited exceptions apply. Players may hold more than one non-FIFA nationality.

Bristol City
No.	Pos.	Nation	Player
1	GK	ENG	Bob Wardle
2	MF	ENG	Martyn Rogers
3	DF		Billy Milne
4	DF	ENG	Steve Harding
5	DF		Paul Crowley
6	DF		David Brown
7	MF		Brian McNeill
8	MF	ENG	Gary Collier
9	FW	ENG	Colin Lee
10	FW		Kevin Prue
11	MF		Vivian Fear

Ipswich Town
No.	Pos.	Nation	Player
1	GK	SCO	David McKellar
2	DF	SCO	George Burley
3	DF	WAL	Les Tibbott
4	DF	ENG	John Stirk
5	DF	ENG	Gary Russo
6	DF	ENG	John Peddelty
7	MF	ENG	Tommy Parkin
8	MF	ENG	Eric Gates
9	FW	ENG	Robin Turner
10	FW	ENG	Steve Vale
11	MF	SCO	Kenny Taylor
Sub	FW	SCO	Paul Adams

== 1971–72: Aston Villa v. Liverpool (1–0 and 4–2, 5–2 aggregate) ==
Note: Flags indicate national team as defined under FIFA eligibility rules; some limited exceptions apply. Players may hold more than one non-FIFA nationality.

Aston Villa
No.	Pos.	Nation	Player
1	GK	SCO	Jake Findlay
2	DF	ENG	John Gidman
3	DF	SCO	Bob McDonald
4	MF	ENG	Alan Little
5	DF	ENG	Roy Stark
6	DF	ENG	Brian Melling
7	MF	SCO	Brian Gray
8	MF	ENG	Doug George
9	FW	ENG	Tony Betts
10	FW	ENG	Brian Little
11	FW	SCO	Mike Brady
Sub	FW	ENG	Dave Smith

Liverpool
No.	Pos.	Nation	Player
1	GK	ENG	Steve Jameson
2	DF	ENG	Brian Kettle
3	DF	ENG	Bob Johnston
4	MF	ENG	Joe James
5	DF	ENG	John Higham
6	MF	ENG	Kevin Kewley
7	MF	ENG	Phil Thompson
8	MF	ENG	Tommy Gore
9	FW	ENG	Derek Brownbill
10	FW	ENG	Tommy Tynan
11	MF	EIR	Tommy Maguire
Sub	FW	ENG	Neil Singleton

== 1970–71: Arsenal v. Cardiff City (0–0 and 2–0, 2–0 aggregate) ==
=== First leg ===
28 April 1971

Arsenal	0–0	Cardiff City

Highbury Stadium, London
Attendance: 3,551
Referee: Derek Nippard

Note: Flags indicate national team as defined under FIFA eligibility rules; some limited exceptions apply. Players may hold more than one non-FIFA nationality.

Arsenal
No.	Pos.	Nation	Player
1	GK	ENG	Graham Horn
2	DF	ENG	Dave Donaldson
3	DF	ENG	Micky Shovelar
4	MF	ENG	David Price
5	DF	ENG	Brendon Batson
6	MF	ENG	Jim de Garis
7	FW	ENG	Brian Hornsby
8	MF	WAL	Charlie Newton
9	FW	WAL	Paul Davies
10	MF	ENG	Terry Burton
11	FW	ENG	Tony Waring
12	FW	ENG	Kevin Kennerley

Cardiff City
No.	Pos.	Nation	Player
1	GK	WAL	John Williams
2	DF	WAL	Phil Dwyer
3	DF	WAL	Jimmy Hobby
4	MF	SCO	Billy Kellock
5	DF	ENG	John Impey (c)
6	DF	WAL	Alan Shaw
7	FW	WAL	Bryan Rees
8	FW	SCO	Jimmy McInch
9	FW	WAL	Alan Couch
10	FW	ENG	George Gibbs
11	FW	WAL	Nigel Rees
12	MF	WAL	Peter Davies

=== Second leg ===
5 May 1971
19:30 BST

Cardiff City	0–2	Arsenal

Ninian Park, Cardiff
Attendance: 12,068
Referee: Derek Nippard

Note: Flags indicate national team as defined under FIFA eligibility rules; some limited exceptions apply. Players may hold more than one non-FIFA nationality.

Arsenal
No.	Pos.	Nation	Player
1	GK	ENG	Graham Horn
2	DF	ENG	Dave Donaldson
3	DF	ENG	Micky Shovelar
4	MF	ENG	David Price
5	DF	ENG	Brendon Batson
6	MF	ENG	Jim de Garis
7	FW	ENG	Brian Hornsby
8	MF	WAL	Charlie Newton
9	FW	WAL	Paul Davies
10	MF	ENG	Terry Burton
11	FW	ENG	Kevin Kennerley

Cardiff City
No.	Pos.	Nation	Player
1	GK	WAL	John Williams
2	DF	WAL	Phil Dwyer
3	DF	WAL	Jimmy Hobby
4	MF	SCO	Billy Kellock
5	DF	ENG	John Impey (c)
6	DF	WAL	Alan Shaw
7	FW	WAL	Bryan Rees
8	FW	SCO	Jimmy McInch
9	FW	WAL	Alan Couch
10	FW	ENG	George Gibbs
11	FW	WAL	Nigel Rees
12	MF	WAL	Peter Davies

== 1969–70: Tottenham Hotspur v. Coventry City (1–0 and 0–1, 1–1 aggregate, replay 2–2 and 2nd replay 1–0) ==
Note: Flags indicate national team as defined under FIFA eligibility rules; some limited exceptions apply. Players may hold more than one non-FIFA nationality.

Tottenham Hotspur
No.	Pos.	Nation	Player
—	GK	ENG	Barry Daines
—	DF	NZL	Bobby Almond
—	DF	ENG	Eddie Jones
—	DF	ENG	Mike Dillon
—	MF	ENG	Steve Perryman
—	DF	ENG	William Edwards
—	MF	ENG	John Oliver
—	MF	SCO	Graeme Souness
—	FW	ENG	Mike Flanagan
—	FW	ENG	Ray Clarke
—		ENG	Ron Gibson

Coventry City
No.	Pos.	Nation	Player
—	GK	ENG	David Icke
—	DF	ENG	Alan Dugdale
—	DF	ENG	Ivan Crossly
—	DF	IRL	Jimmy Holmes
—	MF	WAL	Colin Randell
—	MF	ENG	Dennis Mortimer
—	MF	ENG	Mick McGuire
—	DF	ENG	Bobby Parker
—	MF	WAL	Les Cartwright
—	MF	SCO	John Stevenson
—	FW	USA	Alan Green
