= Ipswich Town F.C. Under-21s and Academy =

Development academy for Ipswich Town Football Club

Ipswich Town Academy
- Full name: Ipswich Town Football Club Under-21s and Academy
- Nickname: The Tractor Boys
- Ground: Playford Road; Portman Road
- Capacity: 1,000 (Playford Road); 30,056 (Portman Road)
- Owner: Gamechanger 20 Ltd.
- Chairman: Mark Ashton
- Manager: John McGreal (U21s); Vacant (U18s)
- League: Premier League 2 (U21s); Premier League (U18s)
Home colours	Away colours	Third colours

Ipswich Town Football Club currently runs a category one academy. The youth teams play their home games at the Ipswich Town Training Centre at Playford Road in Ipswich, Suffolk, while some U21s home games are played at Portman Road.

Some of Ipswich's greatest ever players have come through the club's youth system since the 1960s, including Roger Osborne, Mick Mills, Kevin Beattie, Russell Osman, George Burley, John Wark, Terry Butcher and Jason Dozzell. The academy was also very successful during the 1990s, producing a number of first-team players including Richard Wright, Titus Bramble, James Scowcroft and Kieron Dyer. In more recent years, the academy has produced more young players going onto the main team including Connor Wickham, Jordan Rhodes, Luke Woolfenden, Flynn Downes, Cameron Humphreys and Andre Dozzell, who like his father Jason Dozzell, scored on his debut at the age of 16.

== Under-21s squad ==
As of 10 November 2026

Note: Flags indicate national team as defined under FIFA eligibility rules; some limited exceptions apply. Players may hold more than one non-FIFA nationality.

No.	Pos.	Nation	Player
40	MF	ENG	Charlie Compton
50	GK	IRL	Alex Noonan
57	DF	LTU	Jokūbas Mažionis
58	FW	ENG	Tom Taylor
61	DF	BRB	Leon Elliott
62	FW	ENG	Luca Fletcher
63	DF	ENG	Josh Lewis
64	FW	ENG	James Mauge
65	DF	ZIM	Corbin Mthunzi
66	FW	MLT	Josh Pitts
67	FW	ENG	Frankie Runham

No.	Pos.	Nation	Player
68	DF	GUY	Walker Shabazz-Edwards
71	MF	IRL	Ryan Doherty
73	FW	ENG	Nelson Eze
76	MF	ENG	Bobby Sains
—	GK	SCO	Woody Williamson
—	DF	NIR	Darragh McCann
—	MF	GHA	Isaac Boakye-King
—	FW	ENG	Ashton Boswell
—	FW	ENG	Gerrard Buabo
—	FW	ENG	Nico Valentine

=== Out on loan ===
Note: Flags indicate national team as defined under FIFA eligibility rules; some limited exceptions apply. Players may hold more than one non-FIFA nationality.

No.	Pos.	Nation	Player
43	FW	ENG	Tudor Mendel (at Luton Town until 2 January 2027)
55	GK	ENG	George Barrett (at Braintree Town until 2 January 2027)
59	MF	ENG	Steven Turner (at Woking until 31 May 2027)

No.	Pos.	Nation	Player
—	GK	NZL	Henry Gray (at Wellington Phoenix until 31 May 2027)
—	DF	ENG	Somto Boniface (at Leyton Orient until 31 May 2027)
—	MF	ENG	Fin Barbrook (at Falkirk until 31 May 2027)

Note: Loans only shown for those joined a National League N/S team or higher and for more than a month

== Under-18s squad ==
As of 10 November 2026

Note: Flags indicate national team as defined under FIFA eligibility rules; some limited exceptions apply. Players may hold more than one non-FIFA nationality.

No.	Pos.	Nation	Player
72	FW	NIR	Sidney Eldred
75	FW	CYP	Shakil Nicolaou
77	MF	ENG	Charlie Wood
78	FW	UAE	Jaden Adetiba
79	GK	UAE	Joshua Bentley
89	DF	ENG	Oliver Wilkinson
90	FW	IRL	Christopher Atherton
—	GK	ENG	Ruben Wreford
—	DF	ENG	Praise Adebayo
—	DF	ENG	Riley-Jo Barry
—	DF	ENG	Archie Brown
—	DF	ENG	Harvey Duggins
—	DF	ENG	Pedro Felicio
—	DF	SCO	Harvey Ness
—	DF	ENG	Kellyan Olawole

No.	Pos.	Nation	Player
—	DF	ENG	Daniel Ologho
—	MF	ENG	James Brentnall
—	MF	ENG	Benji Buskell
—	MF	ENG	George Conneely
—	MF	BEL	Jojo Enkotosia
—	MF	ENG	Joshua Hammond
—	MF	AUT	Ziyad Mandey
—	MF	ENG	Ibrahim Msabah
—	MF	ENG	Indiana Pedder
—	MF	ENG	Callum Stewart
—	FW	ENG	Freddie Ambrose
—	FW	ENG	Roman Burton-Yurevich
—	FW	ENG	Reuben Carr
—	FW	ENG	Joel Ladegbaye
—	FW	ENG	Toks Olakazim

== Academy key staff ==
Position	Name
Head of Coaching & Player Development	Vacant
Under-21 Head Coach	(England) John McGreal
Under-18 Head Coach	Vacant
Academy Manager	(England) Ben Chenery
Head of Academy Goalkeeping	(England) Carl Pentney
Head of Foundation Phase	(England) Simon Tricker
Head of Academy Recruitment	(England) Sam Thompson
Academy Loans Manager	(England) Danny Searle
Head of Academy Performance Analysis	(England) Adam Cuthbert
Head of Academy Sports Medicine	(England) Jack Wilce
Head of Academy Sports Science	(England) Nathan Griffith
Lead Strength & Conditioning Coach	Vacant

== Notable academy players ==
The following is a list of players who have played in the Ipswich Town youth system and have gone on to make 3 or more senior appearances at Championship level or above or the top league of that country. Players who are currently playing for the club are highlighted in bold. Players who never made a senior appearance for the club are in italics.

- (England) Colin Harper
- (England) Mick Mills
- (England) Derek Jefferson
- (England) Geoff Hammond
- (England) Laurie Sivell
- (England) Brian Talbot
- (England) Kevin Beattie
- (England) Eric Gates
- (England) Robin Turner
- (Scotland) George Burley
- (England) Tommy Parkin
- (Scotland) John Wark
- (England) Les Tibbott
- (England) Russell Osman
- (Scotland) Alan Brazil
- (England) Terry Butcher
- (England) Gary Stevens
- (England) Kevin Steggles
- (England) Steve McCall
- (South Africa) Mich d'Avray
- (Northern Ireland) Colin Clarke
- (England) Ian Cranson
- (England) Jason Dozzell
- (Canada) Frank Yallop
- (England) Mark Brennan
- (England) Jon Hallworth
- (England) Tony Humes
- (England) Dalian Atkinson
- (Canada) Craig Forrest
- (England) Mick Stockwell
- (England) Chris Kiwomya
- (England) David Gregory
- (England) Richard Hall
- (England) Gavin Johnson
- (Zambia) Neil Gregory
- (England) Adam Tanner
- (England) Tony Vaughan
- (England) Matthew Upson
- (England) Richard Wright
- (England) James Scowcroft
- (England) Richard Naylor
- (England) Kieron Dyer
- (England) Wayne Brown
- (England) Titus Bramble
- (England) Scott Loach
- (England) Arran Lee-Barrett
- (England) Darren Bent
- (England) Darren Ambrose
- (England) Matt Bloomfield
- (England) Matt Richards
- (England) Ian Westlake
- (England) Dean Bowditch
- (Republic of Ireland) Richard Keogh
- (Wales) Lewis Price
- (England) Scott Barron
- (England) Chris Whelpdale
- (England) Josh Simpson
- (Republic of Ireland) Owen Garvan
- (Republic of Ireland) Shane Supple
- (England) Danny Haynes
- (Republic of Ireland) Billy Clarke
- (Northern Ireland) Chris Casement
- (England) Liam Trotter
- (England) Ed Upson
- (England) Ryan Bennett
- (Wales) Morgan Fox
- (Scotland) Jordan Rhodes
- (England) Stuart O'Keefe
- (New Zealand) Tommy Smith
- (England) Nick Pope
- (England) Connor Wickham
- (England) Jack Ainsley
- (Zimbabwe) Macauley Bonne
- (England) Tom Eastman
- (England) Luke Hyam
- (Republic of Ireland) Ronan Murray
- (Northern Ireland) Josh Carson
- (Northern Ireland) Caolan Lavery
- (United States) Cody Cropper
- (England) Jack Marriott
- (England) Teddy Bishop
- (England) Matt Clarke
- (England) Harry Clarke
- (England) Josh Emmanuel
- (England) Myles Kenlock
- (England) Andre Dozzell
- (England) Flynn Downes
- (England) Tristan Nydam
- (England) Luke Woolfenden
- (Australia) Ben Folami
- (England) Jack Lankester
- (Tunisia) Idris El Mizouni
- (England) Liam Gibbs
- (England) Tyreece Simpson
- (Zimbabwe) Tawanda Chirewa
- (Republic of Ireland) Corrie Ndaba
- (England) **Cameron Humphreys**

== Academy Player of the Year ==
Dale Roberts Academy Player of the Year
Year	Name	Ref
2001–02	(England) Will Snowdon	
2002–03	(England) Darren Bent	
2003–04	(England) Dean Bowditch	
2004–05	(Republic of Ireland) Billy Clarke	
2005–06	(Northern Ireland) Chris Casement	
2006–07	(New Zealand) Tommy Smith	
2007–08	(Scotland) Jordan Rhodes	
2008–09	(England) Connor Wickham	
2009–10	(England) Tom Eastman	
2010–11	(Northern Ireland) Josh Carson	
2011–12	(Iceland) Gunnar Thorsteinsson	
2012–13	(England) Jack Marriott	
2013–14	(England) Kyle Hammond	
2014–15	(England) Teddy Bishop	
2015–16	(England) Andre Dozzell	
2016–17	(England) Tristan Nydam	
2017–18	(England) Flynn Downes	
2018–19	(England) Jack Lankester	
2019–20	Not awarded (Note: No Young Player of the Year award was given due to the COVID-19 pandemic, resulting in the early curtailment of the 2019–20 season, and the cancellation of the Supporters' Club annual event.)	
2020–21	Not awarded	
2021–22	(England) Cameron Humphreys	
2022–23	(Republic of Ireland) Edwin Agbaje	
2023–24	(England) Finley Barbrook	
2024–25	(England) Tom Taylor	
2025–26	(England) Tudor Mendel-Idowu	

== Youth honours ==
=== Reserves/Under-21s ===
==== League ====
- The Football Combination

Champions: 1972–73, 1975–76, 2006–07 (East Division), 2007–08 (East Division)

- FA Premier Reserve League South Division

Champions: 2001–02

- Professional Development League South Division

Champions: 2018–19, 2021–22

=== Academy ===
==== League ====
- U17 FA Premier Academy League

Champions: 2000–01

==== Cups ====
- FA Youth Cup

Winners: 1972–73, 1974–75, 2004–05

- Professional Development League Cup

Winners: 2021–22

- Suffolk Premier Cup

Winners: 1967–68, 1968–69, 1969–70, 2006–07, 2009–10
