= 1978 FA Charity Shield =

1978 football match in London, England

- Match programme cover
Ipswich Town	Nottingham Forest
0	5
- Date: 12 August 1978
- Venue: Wembley Stadium, London
- Referee: Peter Reeves (Leicester)
- Attendance: 68,000

The 1978 FA Charity Shield was the 56th FA Charity Shield, an annual football match played between the winners of the previous season's Football League and FA Cup competitions. The match took place on 12 August 1978 at Wembley Stadium and was played between FA Cup winners Ipswich Town and 1977–78 Football League champions Nottingham Forest. Watched by a crowd of 68,000, the match ended in a 5–0 victory for Nottingham Forest.

This was both Ipswich and Nottingham Forest's second appearance in the Charity Shield. Ipswich were unable to field four of the previous season's FA Cup-winning team through injury with Tommy Parkin making his debut. Nottingham Forest took the lead in the tenth minute through Martin O'Neill and doubled their advantage with a Peter Withe goal. Forest's lead was further extended through second-half goals from Larry Lloyd, O'Neill and John Robertson.

== Background and pre-match ==
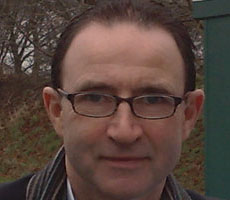
Martin O'Neill scored two goals before being substituted by his manager Brian Clough.

The FA Charity Shield was founded in 1908 as a successor to the Sheriff of London Charity Shield. It was a contest between the respective champions of the Football League and Southern League, and then by 1913 teams of amateur and professional players. In 1921, it was played by the Football League champions and FA Cup winners for the first time. This was the fifth year that Wembley Stadium played host to the Shield.

Despite finishing 18th in the league the previous season, Ipswich Town had beaten Arsenal at Wembley in the FA Cup final three months earlier, the only goal coming from Roger Osborne midway through the second half of the match. Nottingham Forest had won the league in the previous season, seven points clear of Liverpool and having been undefeated at home at the City Ground.

Forest had lost in their only previous Charity Shield final in 1959, beaten 3–1 by Wolverhampton Wanderers; Ipswich had played in the 1962 FA Charity Shield, a game in which they also conceded five goals, that time against 1962 FA Cup final winners Tottenham Hotspur. As of 2023, neither Ipswich Town nor Nottingham Forest have played in a Charity Shield match since 1978.

== Match ==
=== Summary ===
Ipswich were playing without FA Cup winners and international central defenders Kevin Beattie and Allan Hunter, who were replaced by John Wark and Russell Osman. Roger Osborne and David Geddis were also absent from the side, and Tommy Parkin was called upon to make his full professional debut at Wembley. With eight minutes gone, a volley from Parkin was turned behind by Forest goalkeeper Peter Shilton for a corner. Two minutes later however, Martin O'Neill scored in the tenth minute after a number of Ipswich defenders failed to clear a Robertson cross. According to Ronald Atkin of The Observer, Shilton made another "stunning" save to deny Brian Talbot before Peter Withe doubled Forest's lead on 27 minutes. Robertson cut in from the left and turned the ball back to Colin Barrett whose cross Withe headed past Paul Cooper in the Ipswich goal, sending Forest into half-time with a 2–0 lead.

The second half saw Forest increase their lead, with Lloyd scoring from a Robertson free kick after Wark had fouled Withe. Ipswich's Trevor Whymark was substituted off for Robin Turner on 66 minutes, but Forest scored a fourth from an O'Neill strike following a Robertson cross. O'Neill was then immediately substituted by Forest manager Brian Clough for David Needham before he could complete his hat-trick. Just three minutes before full-time, Robertson scored Forest's fifth and final goal. Ipswich's George Burley waited too long for a pass from Osman to reach him and let Robertson steal in to take the ball and strike it past Cooper from the edge of the area. Ipswich had no reply, and the game ended 5–0, a winning margin that, as of 2023, remains unbeaten. It was also the largest winning margin in the Charity Shield since the 1968 match where Manchester City had beaten West Bromwich Albion 6–1.

=== Details ===
12 August 1978
15:00 UTC+1

Ipswich Town	0–5	Nottingham Forest
		O'Neill 10' 65'; Withe 27'; Lloyd 46'; Robertson 87'

Wembley Stadium, London

Ipswich Town	Nottingham Forest

GK	1	(England) Paul Cooper
DF	2	(Scotland) George Burley
DF	3	(England) Mick Mills (c)
MF	4	(England) Brian Talbot
DF	5	(England) Russell Osman
DF	6	(Scotland) John Wark
MF	7	(England) Tommy Parkin
FW	8	(England) Eric Gates
FW	9	(England) Paul Mariner
FW	10	(England) Trevor Whymark	Substituted off
MF	11	(England) Clive Woods
Substitutes:
FW	12	(England) Robin Turner	Substituted on
Manager:
(England) Bobby Robson

GK	1	(England) Peter Shilton
DF	2	(England) Viv Anderson
DF	3	(England) Colin Barrett
MF	4	(Scotland) John McGovern (c)
DF	5	(England) Larry Lloyd
DF	6	(Scotland) Kenny Burns
MF	7	(Northern Ireland) Martin O'Neill	Substituted off
MF	8	(Scotland) Archie Gemmill
FW	9	(England) Peter Withe
FW	10	(England) Tony Woodcock
MF	11	(Scotland) John Robertson
Substitutes:
DF	12	(England) David Needham	Substituted on
Manager:
(England) Brian Clough

Match rules

- 90 minutes, no extra time
- Five named substitutes
- Maximum of three substitutions

== Post-match ==
The shield was presented to the Nottingham Forest captain by former England international and 1966 FIFA World Cup-winning Bobby Charlton, and Clough transgressed protocol by following his team up the steps to receive the trophy.

Nottingham Forest went on to finish as First Division runners-up in the 1978–79 season, once again undefeated at home, finishing eight points behind Liverpool. Ipswich finished sixth in the division.

== See also ==
- 1977–78 Football League
- 1977–78 FA Cup
