= Robin Turner (footballer) =

English footballer (1955–2025)

Personal information
- Full name: Robin David Turner
- Date of birth: 10 September 1955
- Place of birth: Carlisle, England
- Date of death: 22 December 2025 (aged 70)
- Place of death: Belmullet, County Mayo, Ireland
- Height: 5 ft 9 in (1.75 m)
- Position: Forward

Youth career
- 1971–1973: Ipswich Town

Senior career*
Years	Team	Apps	(Gls)
1973–1985	Ipswich Town	48	(2)
1982–1983	→ MVV Maastricht (loan)		
1985	Swansea City	20	(8)
1985	→ Colchester United (loan)	2	(0)
1985–1986	Colchester United	9	(0)
1986–?	Bury Town		
Total		79	(10)

International career
1974	England Youth	4	(1)
- * Club domestic league appearances and goals

Robin David Turner (10 September 1955 – 22 December 2025) was an English professional footballer who played as a forward. An England youth international, he began his career at Ipswich Town. After being part of the FA Youth Cup winning squad of 1973, he made his first-team debut in October 1975. Despite failing to become a first-team regular, he remained at the club until 1985 when he signed for Swansea City. He scored twice on his home debut for his new club, equalling the number of league goals that he had scored in nine seasons at Ipswich, but left later in the year to return to East Anglia when he signed for Colchester United. At the end of the 1985–86 season he dropped into non-League football with Bury Town.

== Career ==
=== Ipswich Town ===
Born in the Harraby suburb of Carlisle, Turner was one of several players spotted in the Carlisle area by renowned scout John Carruthers and recommended to Ipswich Town's Bobby Robson, alongside Kevin Beattie, David Geddis and Steve McCall. After joining Ipswich as an apprentice in May 1971, he became part of the team that won the FA Youth Cup in 1973 against Bristol City, playing alongside George Burley, David McKellar, Tommy Parkin, John Peddelty, Dale Roberts, Eric Gates, John Stirk and Les Tibbott; Turner scored the third goal in a 3–0 win in the first leg of the final at Portman Road, before a 1–1 draw in the second leg saw Town win the trophy for the first time. He also scored nine goals in 15 matches for the reserve team, including scoring on his reserve team debut against Norwich City. His record at Ipswich led to him being called up for the England youth team in 1974, making four appearances and one goal in a 1–1 draw with the Netherlands.

After signing a professional contract in April 1973, Turner became a regular in the reserve team over the next two seasons, scoring six goals in 19 matches in 1973–74 and fourteen in 27 games in 1974–75. He made his first-team debut on 4 October 1975 as a substitute for Roger Osborne in a 1–0 First Division defeat at Derby County. However, that was to be his only first team appearance of the season. In 1975–76 Turner made his second first-team appearance as a substitute in a 5–2 defeat at Aston Villa, but started the next game against Brighton & Hove Albion in the League Cup, with Town losing 2–1. He kept his place for the next two games, but did not make another appearance until playing the full 90 minutes in a 2–1 win over Manchester United on 3 January 1977.

The 1977–78 season was to be Turner's most productive at Ipswich. With an injury crisis affecting the club, he played in fourteen league matches, although it was the FA Cup where he made his greatest contribution. Ipswich were drawn away to Second Division Bristol Rovers in the fifth round, and the game was played on a snow-covered pitch. Turner scored his first-ever goal for Ipswich in the first half to give them the lead, and then netted the equaliser four minutes before the end of the match time as the teams drew 2–2. Turner played in the replay as Ipswich won 3–0 and also in the quarter-final win over Millwall. Although he was in the team that beat West Brom 3–1 in the semi-finals, he was not included in the squad for the final as Robson brought David Geddis into the team to counteract the threat of Sammy Nelson, with Mick Lambert as the only substitute. However, following the final, Turner was awarded the Freedom of the City of Carlisle alongside teammates Geddis and Kevin Beattie.

Despite missing out on a Wembley appearance in the FA Cup, Turner was named as a substitute for the 1978 Charity Shield match at Wembley at the start of the following season and came on for Trevor Whymark as Ipswich lost 5–0 to Nottingham Forest. Turner did not make another first-team appearance during the 1978–79 season as Alan Brazil started coming into the side. However, he returned to first-team action the following season, also making his European debut as he played in and scored a goal in a 3–1 win over Skeid Oslo in the first round of the UEFA Cup. He was a substitute in the return leg at Portman Road, and then played in seven league matches in September and October 1979, as well as a friendly against the New Zealand national team. In 1980 he took part in filming Escape to Victory alongside several Ipswich teammates, appearing as a German player.

The 1980–81 season saw Ipswich competing for the league title, the FA Cup and the UEFA Cup. Turner made three appearances in November, before playing in two matches towards the end of the season as an increasingly patched-up Ipswich team missed out on the league and FA Cup, but won the UEFA Cup. In the following season Turner played only four matches, starting just one game away at Middlesbrough. He had been transfer listed during the season, but a proposed loan move to Preston North End failed to materialise.

Turner joined Dutch second division club MVV Maastricht on loan early during the 1982–83 season, before returning to Ipswich in April. Upon returning to Ipswich he scored his first-ever league goal in a home match against Sunderland on 23 April as Ipswich won 4–1, making five league appearances, all as substitute, by the end of the season. The 1983–84 season saw Turner score a second league goal in his first league appearance on 6 September as Ipswich beat Everton 3–0 at Portman Road. However, despite playing nine more first-team games that season, he failed to score again. His final match for Ipswich was on 14 April 1984, a 2–2 draw with Nottingham Forest at Portman Road, and he did not make a first-team appearance for the club during the 1984–85 season.

=== Swansea City ===
In March 1985 Turner joined Third Division Swansea City on a free transfer. He made his Swansea home debut against Preston North End on 30 March and scored twice, equalling the number of league goals he had scored for Ipswich in nine seasons. Swansea went on to win six of their last eleven matches as they narrowly avoided relegation to the Fourth Division. However, after scoring eight goals in twenty matches, Turner returned to East Anglia to sign on loan for Colchester United on 8 November 1985.

=== Colchester United ===
At the time of Turner's signing, Colchester were managed by Cyril Lea, who had been assistant to Bobby Robson at Ipswich during Turner's time at the club. Turner made his Colchester debut on 8 November 1985 in a 1–0 defeat at home to Rochdale. He signed for the club permanently in December, but failed to score in fourteen league and cup appearances. His final match for Colchester was a 2–2 draw with Burnley on 6 May 1986, after which he left the club, later signing for Eastern Counties League club Bury Town.

== Later life ==
After retiring from professional football, Turner worked as a PE teacher and moved to the Republic of Ireland, becoming a teacher at the Our Lady's Secondary School in Belmullet and coaching the school's football team. He retired in 2024 after 28 years at the school. Turner also played a part in Ipswich signing Irish player Ronan Murray in 2007 after spotting him playing whilst refereeing.

Turner died on 22 December 2025, at the age of 70.

== Honours ==
Ipswich Town

- FA Youth Cup: 1973
