= Ian Smith (disambiguation) =

Ian Smith (1919–2007) was the Prime Minister of Rhodesia from 1964 to 1979.

Ian or Iain Smith may also refer to:

== Entertainment ==
- Iain Crichton Smith (1928–1998), Scottish poet and critic
- Ian Smith (actor) (born 1938), Australian actor, producer and screenwriter
- Iain Smith (producer) (born 1949), Scottish film producer
- Ian Michael Smith (born 1987), American actor, technologist, and disability activist
- Ian Smith (comedian) (born 1988), English comedian
- Ian Smith (photographer) (c. 1921–c. 1987), Scottish photographer
- Iain Campbell Smith, Australian diplomat, singer/songwriter, and comedian

== Politics ==
- Ian Smith (Australian politician) (born 1939), Liberal Party
- Iain Duncan Smith (born 1954), British Conservative Party politician
- Iain Smith (Scottish politician) (born 1960), Liberal Democrat

== Sports ==
=== Cricket ===
- Ian Smith (South African cricketer) (1925–2015)
- Ian Smith (New Zealand cricketer) (born 1957), player and commentator
- Ian Smith (English cricketer) (born 1967), played for Glamorgan and Durham

=== Football ===
- Ian Smith (footballer, born 1952) (Ian Lennox Taylor Smith), Scottish football forward
- Ian Smith (footballer, born 1957) (Ian Ralph Smith), English football fullback born in Rotherham, South Yorkshire
- Paul Smith (footballer, born 22 January 1976) (Ian Paul Smith), English footballer born in Easington, County Durham
- Ian Smith (footballer, born 1998) (Ian Rey Smith Quirós), Costa Rican footballer

=== Rugby ===
- Ian Smith (rugby union, born 1903) (1903–1972)
- Ian Smith (rugby union, born 1941) (1941–2017)
- Ian Smith (rugby union, born 1944), Scottish international rugby union player
- Ian Smith (rugby union, born 1957), nicknamed "Dosser", English rugby player/coach
- Ian Smith (rugby league) (born 1965), Super League referee
- Ian Smith (rugby union, born 1965), rugby union coach

== Others ==
- Ian William Murison Smith (1937–2016), professor of chemistry, University of Birmingham
- Ian Smith (impresario) (1939–2019), journalist, businessman, and impresario
- Iain R. Smith (1939–2021), reader in history at the University of Warwick
- Ian K. Smith (born 1969), African-American physician
- Ian Smith (lobbyist), Australian businessman, corporate advisor and journalist
- Ian Smith (archaeologist) (1954–2020), New Zealand archaeologist
- Ian T. Smith, professor of employment law at the University of East Anglia
- Ian Smith (civil engineer), professor emeritus at the Technical University of Munich
- Ian (rapper), American rapper
