= 1981 West Adelaide SC season =

West Adelaide
1981 season
- Head Coach: Billy Birch; Peter Jaksa
- Stadium: Hindmarsh Stadium
- National Soccer League: 16th
- NSL Cup: Runners-up
- Top goalscorer: League: Lopez Manecas (4); All: Lopez Manecas (7)
- Highest home attendance: 6,328 vs. Cumberland United (22 March 1981); NSL Cup vs. Adelaide City (24 May 1981); National Soccer League
- Lowest home attendance: 1,500 vs. Sydney Olympic (19 August 1981); National Soccer League vs. Brisbane Lions (6 September 1981); National Soccer League vs. Brisbane City (13 September 1981); National Soccer League
- Average home league attendance: 3,005
- Biggest win: 4–0 vs. Preston Makedonia (H) (10 May 1981); National Soccer League
- Biggest defeat: 0–5 vs. South Melbourne (A) (2 August 1981); National Soccer League; 0–5 vs. Heidelberg United (H) (9 August 1981); National Soccer League

The 1981 season was the fifth in the National Soccer League for West Adelaide Soccer Club. In addition to the domestic league, they also participated in the NSL Cup. West Adelaide finished 16th in their National Soccer League season, and were eliminated in the final of the NSL Cup.

== Players ==
Note: Flags indicate national team as defined under FIFA eligibility rules; some limited exceptions apply. Players may hold more than one non-FIFA nationality.

No.	Pos.	Nation	Player
1	GK	AUS	Martyn Crook
2	DF	ENG	Peter Tymczyszyn
3	FW	AUS	Dave Pillans
4	MF	SCO	Neil McGachey
5	DF	ISR	Shraga Topaz
6	MF	AUS	Vic Bozanic
7	MF	AUS	Peter Boyle
8	FW	ANG	Lopez Manecas
9	FW	AUS	Tim Brown
10	MF	SCO	Graham Honeyman
11	MF	SCO	Ian McGregor
12	DF	YUG	Zoran Maricic
13	DF	AUS	Gordon Haig
14	MF	ENG	Neville Flounders
15	FW	RSA	Graham Norris
16	FW	AUS	George Koulianos
17	DF	SCO	Ian McKie

No.	Pos.	Nation	Player
18	FW	AUS	Steve Atsalas
19	MF	AUS	David Doorne
20	GK	AUS	David Miller
21	FW	AUS	Jim Hughes
22	DF	AUS	Steve Baker
23	DF	AUS	Tom Totsikas
24	DF	AUS	Barry Reynolds
—		AUS	Tom Forde
—		AUS	Colin Gregson
—	DF	GRE	Con Kambas
—	FW	AUS	Peter Kowalski
—		AUS	Aldo Lorenzoni
—		AUS	Robert Marwe
—	FW	IRL	Vic Smythe
—	FW	AUS	Bill Stefanopoulos
—	DF	AUS	Jim Vahavolios
—	FW	SCO	Jim Wright

== Competitions ==
=== Overall record ===
Competition	First match	Last match	Starting round	Final position	Record							
Competition	First match	Last match	Starting round	Final position	Pld	W	D	L	GF	GA	GD	Win %
National Soccer League	15 February 1981	13 September 1981	Matchday 1	16th	30	5	4	21	26	47	−21	16.67
NSL Cup	11 March 1981	20 September 1981	First round	Runners-up	5	4	0	1	12	6	+6	80.00
Total					35	9	4	22	38	53	−15	25.71

Source: Competitions

=== National Soccer League ===
==== League table ====
Pos	Team	Pld	W	D	L	GF	GA	GD	Pts	Relegation
1	Sydney City (C)	30	19	5	6	59	30	+29	43	
2	South Melbourne	30	13	13	4	41	27	+14	39	
3	Brisbane City	30	12	11	7	37	25	+12	35	
4	APIA Leichhardt	30	12	11	7	39	33	+6	35	
5	Canberra City	30	13	7	10	41	32	+9	33	
6	Brisbane Lions	30	11	11	8	41	33	+8	33	
7	Adelaide City	30	13	6	11	46	42	+4	32	
8	Heidelberg United	30	12	7	11	48	40	+8	31	
9	Sydney Olympic	30	11	9	10	46	46	0	31	
10	Newcastle KB United	30	11	8	11	41	41	0	30	
11	Wollongong City	30	8	12	10	35	39	−4	28	
12	Preston Makedonia	30	9	7	14	39	41	−2	25	
13	Footscray JUST	30	9	7	14	32	48	−16	25	
14	Marconi Fairfield	30	9	7	14	23	45	−22	25	
15	Blacktown City (R)	30	6	9	15	32	47	−15	21	Relegated to the 1982 NSW State League
16	West Adelaide	30	5	4	21	26	57	−31	14	

Updated to match(es) played on unknown. Source: rsssf.com
Rules for classification: 1) points; 2) goal difference; 3) number of goals scored.
(C) Champions; (R) Relegated

==== Results summary ====
Overall								Home						Away					
Pld	W	D	L	GF	GA	GD	Pts	W	D	L	GF	GA	GD	W	D	L	GF	GA	GD
30	5	4	21	26	57	−31	19	4	3	8	16	23	−7	1	1	13	10	34	−24

Source: worldfootball.net

==== Results by round ====
Round	1	2	3	4	5	6	7	8	9	11	10	12	13	14	15	16	17	18	19	20	21	22	24	25	26	23	27	28	29	30
Ground	A	H	A	H	A	H	A	H	A	A	H	H	A	H	A	A	H	A	H	A	H	A	A	H	A	H	H	A	H	H
Result	L	W	L	L	W	L	L	D	L	L	L	W	D	L	L	L	L	L	D	L	W	L	L	L	L	L	W	L	L	D
Position	11	7	8	12	10	11	13	14	14	16	15	15	15	15	16	16	16	16	16	16	16	16	16	16	16	16	16	16	16	16
Points	0	2	2	2	4	4	4	5	5	5	5	7	8	8	8	8	8	8	9	9	11	11	11	11	11	11	13	13	13	14

Source: worldfootball.net
A = Away; H = Home; W = Win; D = Draw; L = Loss

==== Matches ====
Win Draw Loss

15 February 1981 1	Brisbane City	2–1	West Adelaide	Brisbane
	P. Wilkinson 17'; Palinkas 39' (pen.)	Report	Perry 41' (o.g.)	Stadium: Spencer Park; Attendance: 1,500; Referee: Dave Nugent

22 February 1981 2	West Adelaide	2–0	Blacktown City	Adelaide
	McGregor 20'; Boyle 80'	Report		Stadium: Hindmarsh Stadium; Attendance: 2,700; Referee: Graham Neal

1 March 1981 3	Sydney City	1–0	West Adelaide	Sydney
	Kosmina 39'	Report		Stadium: St George Stadium; Attendance: 1,200; Referee: Tony Boskovic

8 March 1981 4	West Adelaide	0–1	Newcastle KB United	Adelaide
		Report	Mason 70'	Stadium: Hindmarsh Stadium; Attendance: 3,800; Referee: Bobby Kerr

15 March 1981 5	Canberra City	1–2	West Adelaide	Canberra
15:00 AEST	Farrell 66'	Report	Bozanic 10'; Boyle 72'	Stadium: Bruce Stadium; Attendance: 3,170; Referee: Gary Power

29 March 1981 6	West Adelaide	1–2	APIA Leichhardt	Adelaide
	Brown 19'	Report	Giampaolo 8'; O'Connor 69'	Stadium: Hindmarsh Stadium; Attendance: 4,500; Referee: Don Campbell

5 April 1981 7	Marconi Fairfield	1–0	West Adelaide	Sydney
	Sharne 78'	Report		Stadium: Marconi Oval; Attendance: 3,550; Referee: Richard Lorenc

12 April 1981 8	West Adelaide	0–0	Wollongong City	Adelaide
		Report		Stadium: Hindmarsh Stadium; Attendance: 3,100; Referee: Graham Neal

19 April 1981 9	Sydney Olympic	3–1	West Adelaide	Sydney
	Raskopoulos 25'; Cotton 30'; Koussas 51'	Report	Tymczyszyn 35' (pen.)	Stadium: Pratten Park; Attendance: 6,120; Referee: Tim Davies

3 May 1981 11	Heidelberg United	2–0	West Adelaide	Melbourne
	Tansey 28'; Tymczyszyn 83' (o.g.)	Report		Stadium: Olympic Park; Attendance: 3,200; Referee: Dennis Voutsinas

6 May 1981 10	West Adelaide	0–2	South Melbourne	Adelaide
		Report	Christopoulos 49', 58'	Stadium: Hindmarsh Stadium; Attendance: 1,890; Referee: Jim Rossis

10 May 1981 12	West Adelaide	4–0	Preston Makedonia	Adelaide
	Topaz 18'; Honeyman 27'; Boyle 39'; Manecas 64'	Report		Stadium: Hindmarsh Stadium; Attendance: 2,200; Referee: Bobby Kerr

17 May 1981 13	Footscray JUST	1–1	West Adelaide	Melbourne
	Belic 28'	Report	Forde 24'	Stadium: Schintler Reserve; Attendance: 2,000; Referee: Jim Fearn

24 May 1981 14	West Adelaide	0–3	Adelaide City	Adelaide
		Report	Marocchi 32'; Russell 40'; Northcote 71'	Stadium: Hindmarsh Stadium; Attendance: 6,328; Referee: Jim Fearn

31 May 1981 15	Brisbane Lions	3–1	West Adelaide	Brisbane
	McNaughton 39'; Bennett 46'; Latchford 69'	Report	Bozanic 62'	Stadium: Richlands Stadium; Attendance: 2,500; Referee: Col Amos

7 June 1981 16	Blacktown City	4–0	West Adelaide	Sydney
	Burrows 11'; Djordjevic 73'; Jones 80'; Pointer 89'	Report		Stadium: Gabbie Stadium; Attendance: 2,786; Referee: Ken Small

14 June 1981 17	West Adelaide	1–2	Sydney City	Adelaide
	Topaz 35'	Report	Souness 27', 69'	Stadium: Hindmarsh Stadium; Attendance: 2,900; Referee: Chris Bambridge

21 June 1981 18	Newcastle KB United	4–2	West Adelaide	Newcastle
	Channon 13'; Mountford 29'; Senkalski 72', 78'	Report	Manecas 63', 78'	Stadium: Newcastle International Sports Centre; Attendance: 5,875; Referee: Doug Rennie

28 June 1981 19	West Adelaide	1–1	Canberra City	Adelaide
	Manecas 66'	Report	Maclaren 29'	Stadium: Hindmarsh Stadium; Attendance: 3,600; Referee: Don Campbell

5 July 1981 20	APIA Leichhardt	1–0	West Adelaide	Sydney
15:00 AEST	Soper 69'	Report		Stadium: Lambert Park; Attendance: 3,872; Referee: Tony Boskovic

12 July 1981 21	West Adelaide	2–0	Marconi Fairfield	Adelaide
	Lorenzoni 52', 73'	Report		Stadium: Hindmarsh Stadium; Attendance: 3,562; Referee: Graham Neal

19 July 1981 22	Wollongong City	2–1	West Adelaide	Wollongong
	Campbell 49'; Fontana 60'	Report	Smythe 53'	Stadium: Wollongong Showground; Attendance: 4,364; Referee: Henry Witschge

2 August 1981 24	South Melbourne	5–0	West Adelaide	Melbourne
	Blair 3'; Evans 18', 26', 61'; Stevenson 46'	Report		Stadium: Middle Park Soccer Stadium; Attendance: 4,000; Referee: Dennis Voutsinas

9 August 1981 25	West Adelaide	0–5	Heidelberg United	Adelaide
		Report	Cole 47', 61', 74'; Campbell 77', 84'	Stadium: Hindmarsh Stadium; Attendance: 3,500; Referee: Don Campbell

16 August 1981 26	Preston Makedonia	2–0	West Adelaide	Melbourne
	Brown 83'; Lucchesi 84'	Report		Stadium: B.T. Connor Reserve; Attendance: 2,500; Referee: Chris Bambridge

19 August 1981 23	West Adelaide	0–1	Sydney Olympic	Adelaide
		Report	Koussas 1'	Stadium: Hindmarsh Stadium; Attendance: 1,500; Referee: Jim Rossis

23 August 1981 27	West Adelaide	3–2	Footscray JUST	Adelaide
	Honeyman 30'; Topaz 64'; Lorenzoni 80'	Report	Verweij 29'; Lujic 63'	Stadium: Hindmarsh Stadium; Attendance: 2,500; Referee: Bob Kerr

30 August 1981 28	Adelaide City	2–1	West Adelaide	Adelaide
	J. Nyskohus 14'; Melta 19'	Report	Smythe 50'	Stadium: Olympic Sports Field; Attendance: 3,000; Referee: Stewart Mellings

6 September 1981 29	West Adelaide	1–3	Brisbane Lions	Adelaide
	Stefanopoulos 85'	Report	Williamson 34', 70'; Low 59'	Stadium: Hindmarsh Stadium; Attendance: 1,500; Referee: Don Campbell

13 September 1981 30	West Adelaide	1–1	Brisbane City	Adelaide
	Forde 76'	Report	Wilkinson 26'	Stadium: Hindmarsh Stadium; Attendance: 1,500; Referee: Jim Rossis

=== NSL Cup ===
Win Draw Loss

11 March 1981 First round	West Adelaide	3–0	Para Hills	Adelaide
	Brown 53'; Tymczyszyn 81' (pen.); Pillans 85'	Report		Stadium: Hindmarsh Stadium; Attendance:

22 March 1981 Second round	West Adelaide	3–2	Cumberland United	Adelaide
	McGachey 48'; Manecas 56'; Norris 86'	Report	Mahoney 33'	Stadium: Hindmarsh Stadium; Attendance: 6,328; Referee: Barry Harwood

17 June 1981 Quarter-finals	West Adelaide	4–2	Brisbane City	Adelaide
	Lorenzoni 18'; Manecas 57' (?); Smythe 88'	Report	Caldwell 11'; Hamilton 48'	Stadium: Hindmarsh Stadium; Attendance: 1,800; Referee: Jim Rossis

29 July 1981 Semi-finals	West Adelaide	1–0	Adelaide City	Adelaide
	Bozanic 62'	Report		Stadium: Hindmarsh Stadium; Attendance: 6,200; Referee: Barry Harwood

20 September 1981 Final	Brisbane Lions	3–1	West Adelaide	Canberra
15:00 AEST	Daunt 4'; Ferris 75'; Williamson 87' (pen.)	Report	Topaz 82'	Stadium: Canberra Stadium; Attendance: 6,132; Referee: Chris Bambridge

== Statistics ==
=== Appearances and goals ===
Includes all competitions. Players with no appearances not included in the list.

No.	Pos.	Nat.	Player	National Soccer League		NSL Cup		Total	
No.	Pos.	Nat.	Player	Apps	Goals	Apps	Goals	Apps	Goals
1	GK	(Australia)	Martyn Crook	29	0	5	0	34	0
2	DF	(England)	Peter Tymczyszyn	11	1	2	1	13	2
3	FW	(Australia)	Dave Pillans	4+1	0	1	1	6	1
4	MF	(Scotland)	Neil McGachey	8	0	1+1	1	10	1
5	DF	(Israel)	Shraga Topaz	22	3	4	1	26	4
6	MF	(Australia)	Vic Bozanic	24	2	4	1	28	3
7	MF	(Australia)	Peter Boyle	14	3	2	0	16	3
8	FW	(Angola)	Lopez Manecas	18+2	4	4	3	24	7
9	FW	(Australia)	Tim Brown	21+4	1	3+1	1	29	2
10	MF	(Scotland)	Graham Honeyman	26+1	2	4	0	31	2
11	MF	(Scotland)	Ian McGregor	19+1	1	3	0	23	1
12	DF	(Socialist Federal Republic of Yugoslavia)	Zoran Maricic	18+1	0	5	0	24	0
13	DF	(Australia)	Gordon Haig	5+6	0	0	0	11	0
15	FW	(South Africa)	Graham Norris	13	0	0+1	1	14	1
16	FW	(Australia)	George Koulianos	2+1	0	1+1	0	5	0
17	DF	(Australia)	Ian McKie	14+4	0	2	0	20	0
18	FW	(Australia)	Steve Atsalas	0+2	0	0	0	2	0
20	GK	(Australia)	David Miller	1	0	0	0	1	0
21	FW	(Australia)	Jim Hughes	0+2	0	0	0	2	0
22	DF	(Australia)	Steve Baker	0+1	0	0	0	1	0
23	DF	(Australia)	Tom Totsikas	0	0	1	0	1	0
24	DF	(Australia)	Barry Reynolds	1+1	0	0	0	2	0
—	—	(Australia)	Tom Forde	20+1	2	2	0	23	2
—	—	(Australia)	Colin Gregson	1+2	0	0	0	3	0
—	DF	(Greece)	Con Kambas	15	0	2+1	0	18	0
—	FW	(Australia)	Peter Kowalski	8+2	0	1+1	0	12	0
—	—	(Australia)	Aldo Lorenzoni	7+6	3	2+1	1	16	4
—	—	(Australia)	Robert Marwe	3+1	0	0	0	4	0
—	FW	(Republic of Ireland)	Vic Smythe	12	2	2+1	1	15	3
—	FW	(Australia)	Bill Stefanopoulos	3	1	0	0	3	1
—	DF	(Australia)	Jim Vahavolios	1	0	0	0	1	0
—	FW	(Scotland)	Jim Wright	10+3	0	1	0	14	0

=== Disciplinary record ===
Includes all competitions. The list is sorted by squad number when total cards are equal. Players with no cards not included in the list.

Rank	No.	Pos.	Nat.	Player	National Soccer League			NSL Cup			Total		
Rank	No.	Pos.	Nat.	Player	Yellow card	Second yellow card	Red card	Yellow card	Second yellow card	Red card	Yellow card	Second yellow card	Red card
1	5	DF	(Israel)	Shraga Topaz	2	0	1	0	0	0	2	0	1
1	10	MF	(Scotland)	Graham Honeyman	1	0	1	1	0	0	2	0	1
3	12	DF	(Socialist Federal Republic of Yugoslavia)	Zoran Maricic	6	0	0	0	0	0	6	0	0
4	6	MF	(Australia)	Vic Bozanic	3	0	0	1	0	0	4	0	0
4	—	—	(Australia)	Tom Forde	3	0	0	1	0	0	4	0	0
6	7	MF	(Australia)	Peter Boyle	3	0	0	0	0	0	3	0	0
6	11	MF	(Scotland)	Ian McGregor	3	0	0	0	0	0	3	0	0
8	2	DF	(England)	Peter Tymczyszyn	1	0	0	0	0	0	1	0	0
8	15	FW	(South Africa)	Graham Norris	1	0	0	0	0	0	1	0	0
8	17	DF	(Scotland)	Ian McKie	1	0	0	0	0	0	1	0	0
8	—	DF	(Greece)	Con Kambas	1	0	0	0	0	0	1	0	0
8	—	FW	(Republic of Ireland)	Vic Smythe	1	0	0	0	0	0	1	0	0
Total					26	0	2	3	0	0	29	0	2

=== Clean sheets ===
Includes all competitions. The list is sorted by squad number when total clean sheets are equal. Numbers in parentheses represent games where both goalkeepers participated and both kept a clean sheet; the number in parentheses is awarded to the goalkeeper who was substituted on, whilst a full clean sheet is awarded to the goalkeeper who was on the field at the start of play. Goalkeepers with no clean sheets not included in the list.

Rank	No.	Nat.	Goalkeeper	NSL	NSL Cup	Total
1	1	(Australia)	Martyn Crook	4	2	6
Total				4	2	6
