= Michael Lambert =

Michael Lambert may refer to:

- Michael J. Lambert (born 1944), Professor of psychology
- Michael Lambert (volleyball) (born 1974), American volleyball player
- Michael Lambert (snowboarder) (born 1986), Canadian snowboarder
- Mick Lambert, English footballer

== See also ==
- Michel Lambert, French singing master, theorbist and composer
