= Roy Stark =

Roy Stark may refer to:

- Roy Stark (The Walking Dead)
- Roy Stark (footballer) in FA Youth Cup Finals of the 1970s
- Roy Stark, character played by David Keith
