= David Price (footballer, born 1955) =

English footballer

Personal information
- Full name: David James Price
- Date of birth: 23 June 1955 (age 71)
- Place of birth: Caterham, Surrey England
- Position: Midfielder

Senior career*
Years	Team	Apps	(Gls)
1972–1980	Arsenal	126	(16)
1974–1975	→ Peterborough United (loan)	6	(1)
1980–1982	Crystal Palace	27	(2)
1982–1983	Leyton Orient	10	(0)
- Wealdstone
Total		169	(19)

International career
1970	England Schoolboys	5	(0)
1973	England Youth	7	(0)
- * Club domestic league appearances and goals

David James Price (born 23 June 1955) is an English former footballer who played as a midfielder. Price played in the Football League for Arsenal, Peterborough United, Crystal Palace and Leyton Orient.

== Career ==
Born in Caterham, Surrey, Price was snapped up by Arsenal in 1970, as a prodigious young midfielder who captained England schoolboys. Whilst at the Gunners's Academy he went on to win the FA Youth Cup of 1971. Price made his debut for Arsenal at the age of 17 on 9 May 1973 in a First Division match against Leeds United. However, he played mostly with the reserves for the next few years.

After a loan spell at Peterborough United, Price broke into the Arsenal first team in 1977–78, playing 51 matches that season. This was noteworthy as he had previously made only 13 appearances for the club. His regular spell in the Arsenal side coincided with the Gunners' FA Cup runs of the late 1970s, where they consecutively got to the 1978 to 1980 finals of the cup. Price thus played three times at Wembley with Arsenal winning the 1979 FA Cup in a 3–2 win against Manchester United. Price got an assist in the game as he set up Brian Talbot for the opening goal. Price also played in Arsenal's 1980 Cup Winners' Cup defeat at the hands of Valencia, on penalties.

Price lost his place to the veteran John Hollins at the start of the 1980–81 season. Subsequently, he was sold to Crystal Palace in March 1981, in a part-exchange deal which saw Peter Nicholas move the other way. In all he played 176 games for Arsenal, scoring 19 goals.

Price's spell at Crystal Palace was not a successful one, as he was hampered by injuries and made only 27 League appearances in two seasons. After he had a brief spell at Leyton Orient, he ended his playing days due to injury, at the age of 28.

He later became a taxi driver in Croydon.

== Honours ==
Arsenal Youth

- FA Youth Cup: 1971

Arsenal

- FA Cup: 1978–79; runner-up: 1977–78, 1979–80
