= Steve Brennan (footballer, born 1958) =

English footballer

Personal information
- Date of birth: 3 September 1958
- Place of birth: Mile End, England
- Date of death: 13 August 2015 (aged 56)
- Place of death: Islington, England
- Position: Midfielder

Youth career
- ?–1976: Crystal Palace

Senior career*
Years	Team	Apps	(Gls)
1976–1978	Crystal Palace	3	(1)
1978–1979	Plymouth Argyle	6	(0)
- Leatherhead
Total		9	(1)
- * Club domestic league appearances and goals

Steve Brennan (3 September 1958 – 13 August 2015) was an English professional footballer who played as a midfielder in the Football League for Crystal Palace and Plymouth Argyle before moving into non-league football with Leatherhead.

== Playing career ==
Brennan was born in Mile End, Greater London, and began his youth career at Crystal Palace where he was part of the successful youth squad which won the FA Youth Cup in 1977 and 1978. He signed professional terms in February 1976 and made his senior debut on 31 August 1976, in an away 1–3 defeat to Watford in the League Cup. His first Football League appearance was on 2 March 1977, in an away 2–3 defeat to Lincoln City, when he scored one of Palace's goals. Brennan made only one further appearance that season and one in 1977–8 before signing for Plymouth Argyle on 1 August 1978. At Plymouth, Brennan made only six appearances and moved into non-league football with Leatherhead in 1979.

Brennan died on 13 August 2015, aged 56.
