= Dave Donaldson (footballer, born 1954) =

English footballer

Personal information
- Full name: David John Donaldson
- Date of birth: 12 November 1954 (age 71)
- Place of birth: Islington, England
- Position: Right back

Youth career
- –: Arsenal

Senior career*
Years	Team	Apps	(Gls)
1972–1973	Arsenal	0	(0)
1973–1979	Millwall	216	(1)
1979	→ Los Angeles Skyhawks (loan)		
1980–1984	Cambridge United	132	(0)
1984–19??	Royston Town		

International career
1970	England Schoolboys	8	(0)
1972	England Youth	2	(0)
- * Club domestic league appearances and goals

David John Donaldson (born 12 November 1954) is an English former professional football right back who made 348 appearances in the Football League playing for Millwall and Cambridge United. He also played for the Los Angeles Skyhawks of the American Soccer League and for non-league club Royston Town, and was on the books of Arsenal without making a first-team appearance.

== Career ==
Donaldson was born in Islington, London, and was an England schoolboy international before beginning his football career with Arsenal. He was a member of their 1971 FA Youth Cup-winning side, but never broke through to the first team. In May 1973, he was snapped up Second Division Millwall after being released by Arsenal on a Free Transfer. The team were relegated in 1975, and Donaldson helped them achieve promotion back to the Second Division in 1975–76, and made 258 appearances in all competitions over a six-and-a-half-year period. He acted as an emergency goalkeeper three times during his Millwall career. He spent the summer of 1979 with the Los Angeles Skyhawks of the American Soccer League, and on 5 February 1980, signed for Second Division Cambridge United for a fee of £50,000. He made 132 league appearances for Cambridge and was featured in a 2002 book, Cambridge United: 101 Golden Greats. In 1984, he moved on to Royston Town of the Isthmian League.

== Personal life ==
After retiring from football, Donaldson ran a fish and chip shop and then worked for a food company as sales manager.

== Honours ==
Arsenal

- FA Youth Cup: 1970–71

Millwall

- Football League Third Division promotion: 1975–76
