= Tony Tuddenham =

English footballer

Personal information
- Full name: Anthony Richard Tuddenham
- Date of birth: 28 September 1956 (age 70)
- Place of birth: Reepham, England
- Position: Defender

Youth career
- West Ham United

Senior career*
| Years | Team | Apps | (Gls) |
| 1974–1975 | West Ham United | 0 | (0) |
| 1975–1977 | Cambridge United | 12 | (0) |
| 1977–? | Cambridge City | ? | (?) |
- * Club domestic league appearances and goals

Anthony Richard Tuddenham (born 28 September 1956) is an English former professional footballer who played in the Football League as a defender. Born in Reepham, Norfolk, Tuddenham began his youth career at West Ham United and played in the 1975 FA Youth Cup Final against Ipswich Town. He did not make a senior league appearance for the club, moving on shortly afterwards to Cambridge United, for whom he played 12 times over the next two seasons, scoring twice. In 1977, he moved into non-league football with Cambridge City.

He then worked for Norwich Union and now lives in Fakenham.
