= John Stirk =

English footballer

Personal information
- Full name: John Stirk
- Date of birth: 5 September 1955 (age 71)
- Place of birth: Consett, England
- Position: Right back

Youth career
- Consett
- 1971–1973: Ipswich Town

Senior career*
Years	Team	Apps	(Gls)
1973–1978	Ipswich Town	6	(0)
1978–1980	Watford	46	(0)
1980–1983	Chesterfield	56	(0)
1983	Blyth Spartans		
1983	Tow Law Town		
1984	North Shields		
1986	Newcastle Blue Star		

International career
1974	England Youth	2	(0)
- * Club domestic league appearances and goals

John Stirk (born 5 September 1955) is an English former footballer. His primary position was as a right back. During his career he played for Ipswich Town, Watford, Chesterfield and North Shields. He also made two appearances for England at youth level.

== Career ==
Born in Consett, Stirk played youth football for local non-league team Consett A.F.C. He joined Ipswich Town on schoolboy terms in 1971, and after making two appearances for the England youth team and winning the FA Youth Cup, turned professional in 1973. During his time at Ipswich he was largely a reserve. He made his first-team debut on 5 November 1977, in a Football League First Division match against Manchester City at Portman Road. His manager at the time was Bobby Robson, who later went on to manage the England national football team. Ipswich won the FA Cup in 1978, in what proved to be Stirk's final season at the club. However, Stirk himself did not play in the final, nor did he play in any of the rounds en route to the final.

Another future England manager, Watford's Graham Taylor, signed Stirk for a transfer fee of £30,000 at the end of the 1977–78 season. Stirk went on to play every Watford league game in the 1978–79 season, as Watford gained promotion to the Second Division. However, Stirk did not play for Watford in the Second Division. Two months before the end of the 1979–80 season, Stirk was sold to Third Division side Chesterfield, at a profit to Watford of £10,000. After making 56 league appearances over two and a half seasons, Stirk left Chesterfield in 1983 moving on to Blyth Spartans then Tow Law Town, and finished his career at non-league North Shields.
