= David McKellar =

Scottish footballer and manager

Personal information
- Full name: David Norwood McKellar
- Date of birth: 22 May 1956 (age 70)
- Place of birth: Irvine, Scotland
- Height: 1.86 m (6 ft 1 in)
- Position: Goalkeeper

Youth career
- Saltcoats Victoria
- Kilwinning Rangers
- 1972–1975: Ipswich Town

Senior career*
Years	Team	Apps	(Gls)
1975–1976	Ipswich Town	0	(0)
	→ Colchester United (loan)	0	(0)
	→ Peterborough United (loan)	0	(0)
1976–1977	Dundee United	0	(0)
1977	Forfar Athletic	1	(0)
1977–1978	Ardrossan Winton Rovers		
1978–1980	Derby County	41	(0)
1980–1982	Brentford	84	(0)
1982–1983	Happy Valley		
1983–1985	Carlisle United	82	(0)
1985–1986	Hibernian	0	(0)
	→ Manchester City (loan)	0	(0)
1986	→ Newcastle United (loan)	10	(0)
1986–1988	Hamilton Academical	52	(0)
1988	Dunfermline Athletic	6	(0)
1988	→ Hartlepool United (loan)	5	(0)
1988–1990	Carlisle United	69	(0)
1990–1991	Kilmarnock	6	(0)
1991–1992	Rangers	0	(0)

International career
- Scotland U18

Managerial career
- Kilbirnie Ladeside
- 1995: Largs Thistle
- Saltcoats Victoria
- Ardrossan Winton Rovers
- Ardeer Thistle
- Petershill
- Irvine Meadow XI
- * Club domestic league appearances and goals

David Norwood McKellar (born 22 May 1956) is a Scottish retired professional footballer, best remembered for his time as a goalkeeper in the Football League with Carlisle United, for whom he made 160 appearances for the club over two spells. In a long career, he played in all four divisions of the English league pyramid and the top three divisions in Scotland. McKellar later managed in Scottish junior and amateur football.

== Club career ==
=== Early years ===
McKellar began his career in his native Scotland with junior clubs Saltcoats Victoria and Kilwinning Rangers, securing a move to English First Division club Ipswich Town in September 1972, managed by Bobby Robson. Among his youth teammates were future professionals George Burley, Robin Turner and Eric Gates and they won the FA Youth Cup in 1973. McKellar made 30 appearances for the reserve team over the next four years and failed to make a first team appearance. McKellar was also sent out on loan to lower division clubs Colchester United and Peterborough United and failed to make an appearance for either. He departed Portman Road in May 1976, after suffering from homesickness.

=== Return to Scotland ===
McKellar returned to Scotland to sign for Scottish League Premier Division club Dundee United on 22 May 1976, his 20th birthday. He failed to make a first team appearance and joined Scottish League Second Division club Forfar Athletic in September 1977. He made only one appearance for the club before dropping back into junior football to sign for Ardrossan Winton Rovers in 1977. While with Ardrossan Winton Rovers, Nairn County of the Scottish Highland Football League made enquiries for McKeller but no business was concluded due to the distance involved between McKellers home in Irvine and Nairn in the Highlands.

=== Derby County ===
A second chance at Football League level materialised for McKellar in 1978, in the form of a £2,500 move to First Division club Derby County on 8 April 1978. He had to wait until 16 December 1978 to make his debut, which came in a 2–0 defeat to Arsenal at Highbury. He went on to enjoy a run in the team, making 17 appearances in what remained of the 1978–79 season. He played around half the Rams' games during the 1979–80 season, making 26 appearances and keeping 10 clean sheets, but the campaign ended with relegation to Second Division. After failing to make an appearance during the first month of the 1980–81 season, McKellar left Derby in September 1980. He made 43 appearances during two years at the Baseball Ground.

=== Brentford ===
McKellar dropped down to Third Division to sign for Brentford for a £25,000 fee in September 1980. He quickly staunched the flow of goals into the Bees' net and made 42 appearances during the 1980–81 season, which included a run of six successive clean sheets in December 1980 through to January 1981. McKellar made a career-high 50 appearances during the 1981–82 season, but fell out with manager Fred Callaghan during the 1982 off-season and had his contract cancelled, though the club held his registration for the duration of the 1982–83 season. McKellar made 96 appearances during just under two years as an active player at Griffin Park.

=== Happy Valley ===
Unable to play within England due to his playing registration still being held by Brentford, McKellar played for Hong Kong First Division League club Happy Valley during the 1982–83 season.

=== Carlisle United ===
McKellar returned to England to sign for Second Division club Carlisle United in August 1983 for £4,000 in a part-exchange deal which saw Trevor Swinburne move to Brentford. He made 82 league appearances over the course of two seasons, before leaving in 1985. McKellar's 19 clean sheets during the 1983–84 season remains a club record.

=== Hibernian ===
McKellar moved to Edinburgh to join Scottish League Premier Division club Hibernian on a two-year contract for an £8,000 fee in 1985. Signed as backup for Alan Rough, the move reunited McKellar with Hibs assistant manager Tommy Craig, a former teammate at Carlisle United. After playing a few reserve team matches, McKellar walked out on Hibernian and accused the club of not paying his travel or accommodation expenses. Hibernian countered by claiming McKellar failed to show commitment to the club and to relocate to Edinburgh from his Carlisle home. Rochdale and Wrexham made enquiries about signing McKellar, but moves failed to materialise. He had loan spells with English First Division clubs Manchester City and Newcastle United during the second half of the 1985–86 season, impressing enough to be offered a permanent contract by the latter club, which fell through after the sacking of manager Willie McFaul.

=== Hamilton Academical ===
McKellar signed for newly promoted Scottish League Premier Division club Hamilton Academical prior to the beginning of the 1986–87 season. He made 41 appearances as the Accies suffered relegation straight back to the Scottish League First Division. Unable to keep Rikki Ferguson out of the team on a regular basis, McKellar made 16 appearances in the First Division prior to departing Douglas Park in early 1988. He made 59 appearances for Hamilton.

=== Dunfermline Athletic ===
McKellar moved back up to the Scottish League Premier Division to sign for Dunfermline Athletic in early 1988. He made six league appearances in what remained of the 1987–88 season, one of them coming in a famous 2–0 Scottish League Cup fourth round victory over giants Rangers. After failing to make an appearance in the early part of the 1988–89 season and spending time on loan at Fourth Division club Hartlepool United, McKellar departed East End Park in October 1988.

=== Return to Carlisle United ===
McKellar rejoined Carlisle United in October 1988, then languishing in the Fourth Division. He made 34 league appearances during the 1988–89 season for the struggling Cumbrians and won the club's Player of the Year award. After a further 35 league appearances during the 1989–90 season, McKellar departed Brunton Park in March 1990. Across his two spells with Carlisle, McKellar made 163 appearances. In 2009, McKellar was named number 55 on the News and Star's Top 100 Carlisle United Players list. Looking back in 2011, McKellar said "I really loved the club, as there was a lovely atmosphere, because we had such a small squad, so we all had to pull together".

=== Kilmarnock ===
McKellar returned to Scotland to sign for Second Division club Kilmarnock in March 1990 for a £20,000 fee. He made five appearances in what remained of the 1989–90 season, helping Killie over the line to automatic promotion to Division One. He made just one league appearance during the 1990–91 season and departed at the end of the campaign.

=== Rangers ===
McKellar moved back up to the Scottish League Premier Division to sign for Walter Smith's Rangers in 1991, as backup for Andy Goram. He failed to make an appearance during the 1991–92 season, but received a small taste of European football for the only time in his career, when he was an unused substitute during both legs of Rangers' European Cup first round matches against Sparta Prague. McKellar retired from football at the end of the season.

== International career ==
McKellar represented the Scotland U18 team at an U18 European Championship in the 1970s.

== Management and coaching career ==
After retiring from football, McKellar became a manager, managing Scottish junior and amateur clubs Kilbirnie Ladeside, Largs Thistle, Saltcoats Victoria, Androssan Winton Rovers, Ardeer Thistle, Petershill and Irvine Meadow XI. McKellar turned down an offer from his former Rangers manager Walter Smith to become goalkeeping coach at Premier League club Everton, during Smith's tenure as manager of the club.

== Personal life ==
As of 2011, McKellar was a grandfather and working in social services.

== Career statistics ==
Appearances and goals by club, season and competition
Club	Season	League			National cup (Note: Includes Scottish Cup, FA Cup)		League cup (Note: Includes Scottish League Cup, Football League Cup)		Europe		Other		Total	
Club	Season	Division	Apps	Goals	Apps	Goals	Apps	Goals	Apps	Goals	Apps	Goals	Apps	Goals
Forfar Athletic	1977–78	Scottish Second Division	1	0	0	0	0	0	—		0	0	1	0
Derby County	1978–79	First Division	16	0	1	0	0	0	—		—		17	0
Derby County	1979–80	First Division	25	0	1	0	0	0	—		—		26	0
Derby County	Total		41	0	2	0	0	0	—		—		43	0
Brentford	1980–81	Third Division	39	0	3	0	—		—		—		42	0
Brentford	1981–82	Third Division	45	0	3	0	2	0	—		—		50	0
Brentford	Total		84	0	6	0	2	0	—		—		92	0
Newcastle United (loan)	1985–86	First Division	10	0	—		—		—		—		10	0
Hamilton Academical	1986–87	Scottish Premier Division	36	0	2	0	2	0	—		1 (Note: Appearance in Lanarkshire Cup)	0	41	0
Hamilton Academical	1987–88	Scottish First Division	16	0	0	0	1	0	—		1	0	18	0
Hamilton Academical	Total		52	0	2	0	3	0	—		2	0	59	0
Hartlepool United (loan)	1988–89	Fourth Division	5	0	—		2	0	—		—		7	0
Kilmarnock	1989–90	Scottish Second Division	5	0	—		—		—		—		5	0
Kilmarnock	1990–91	Scottish First Division	1	0	0	0	0	0	—		—		1	0
Kilmarnock	Total		6	0	0	0	0	0	—		—		6	0
Rangers	1991–92	Scottish Premier Division	0	0	0	0	0	0	0	0	—		0	0
Career total			198	0	10	0	7	0	0	0	2	0	217	0

== Honours ==
- Carlisle United Player of the Season: 1988–89
