= Paul Davies (footballer, born 1952) =

Welsh footballer

Personal information
- Date of birth: 10 October 1952 (age 74)
- Place of birth: Holywell, Flintshire, Wales
- Position: Forward

Youth career
- Arsenal

Senior career*
Years	Team	Apps	(Gls)
1969–1972	Arsenal	1	(0)
1972–1974	Charlton Athletic	57	(9)
1975–1976	Romford	30	(13)
- * Club domestic league appearances and goals

Paul Davies (born 10 October 1952) is a Welsh retired footballer, who played as a forward for Arsenal and Charlton Athletic in the 1970s.

Born in Holywell, Flintshire, he is the younger brother of Southampton and Wales striker Ron Davies. He played as a schoolboy for Wales and joined Arsenal as a trainee, featuring in Arsenal's 1971 FA Youth Cup final triumph. He turned professional at Highbury in November 1969 and helped the Gunners win the Football Combination title that season. His solitary First Division appearance was as a substitute in Arsenal's 4–2 victory at home to Newcastle United in October 1971.

He was sold to Charlton Athletic for £10,000 in November 1972 after a loan spell. He stayed with Charlton for two years, making a total of 67 appearances. In March 1975, he moved to Romford where injury ended his career.

Following retirement from football he became a London black cab driver, and lives in Hatfield, Hertfordshire.

== Honours ==
Arsenal

- FA Youth Cup: Winners 1971
