= Ian Smith (photographer) =

Scottish photographer

Ian Smith (c.1921—c.1987) was a Scottish photographer who was on the staff of LIFE magazine in 1944.

== Early life and education ==
Ian Smith was born in Edinburgh of Scottish parents and received a box Brownie camera when he was eight. A teacher of English, French and history, he took up courses in photography and was hired in mid-1942 as stills photographer on the British film A Canterbury Tale.

== Photographer of politicians ==
Smith photographed mainly in the UK for LIFE magazine as a member of the magazine's London office from September 1944, and was listed as a staff photographer during 1946. He contributed to a 25 Jun 1945 article in Life on the British Election of that year and many of his subjects were Labour and Conservative politicians including British statesman Harold Macmillan, Minister for Education Ellen Wilkinson, Herbert Morrison, Barbara Ayrton-Gould, and British Chancellor of the Exchequer Hugh Dalton. He photographed Brighton Vigilantes leader Harry Cowley speaking at a rally in Hyde Park to protest the housing problem and produced an extensive series following firebrand politician and Labour party leader Aneurin Bevan whom he also photographed when Bevan was an editor of Tribune newspaper (1941–45); others include Chairman of the Labour Party Professor Harold J Laski; Lord Chancellor Lord William Jowitt; British President of the Board of Trade Stafford Cripps; Lord Beaverbrook; Prime Minister Winston Churchill; Ernest Bevin; Independent MPs Tom Driberg and Denis Kendall at the House of Commons; and Conservatives Alexander V E P Montagu, General Director Sir Robert Topping, Vice-Chairman Marjorie Maxse, and Ralph Assheton.

== Actors ==
Prior to joining Life, from at least 1942 Smith was a stills photographer for a British motion picture company, so actors, directors, producers and movie stars also appeared before Smith's lens, including Margaret Lockwood in her dressing room on the set of Hungry Hill; Deborah Kerr; directors Anthony Asquith and David Lean; designer Roger Furze; director Carol Reed talking with columnist Hedda Hopper; Irish actor Dennis O'Dean in a scene from the movie Odd Man Out; Anna Neagle standing in front of a portrait of her during her portrayal of Queen Victoria; and in one shot Michael Redgrave, Ronald Shiner and Danny Green talk with Sidney Box and his wife on the set of the movie The Man Within. Others include; Ann Todd; Irish actress Kathleen Ryan; Stewart Granger; Wendy Hiller; Sidney Gillat on the set of the movie Green for Danger; Jean Simmons; Patricia Roc; Emlyn Williams; and producers Herbert Wilcox and Frank Lander.

== British society ==
Smith also covered stories on British postwar austerity and recovery; refugees from Europe, child evacuees returning to London, and revelers at Lambeth Walk celebrating VE Day the end of WW2 in Europe. One story covered English castles, and another, the archaeologist who found a large collection of 3rd century Roman pottery in the Alice Holt Forest of North Hampshire. Life published his pictures of the trompe-l'œil painted camouflage of Britain's pillboxes; and of the newly ordained Archbishop of Canterbury.

== Recognition ==
His 1945 picture for a story Evacuees return to London was included in the 1955 Museum of Modern Art show The Family of Man curated by Edward Steichen that toured the world and was seen by 9 million visitors; a tiny girl, barely more than a toddler, accompanied by a woman whose legs are the only sign of her presence in the picture, peers through a sturdy farm gate to bid farewell to a steer in the foreground.

== Personal life ==
There is scant information about Smith's personal life or on his early or late career, though at Getty Images photo agency there is a June 1945 portrait of him by Bob Landry showing him aged about twenty-four and holding his Rolleiflex .
