= Les Tibbott =

Welsh footballer

Personal information
- Full name: Leslie Tibbott
- Date of birth: 25 August 1955 (age 71)
- Place of birth: Oswestry, England
- Height: 5 ft 10 in (1.78 m)
- Positions: Defender; midfielder

Youth career
- Ipswich Town

Senior career*
Years	Team	Apps	(Gls)
1973–1979	Ipswich Town	54	(0)
1979–1982	Sheffield United	78	(2)
1985	TP-Seinäjoki		

International career
	Wales U21	2	(0)

Managerial career
- 1985: TP-Seinäjoki
- * Club domestic league appearances and goals

Leslie Tibbott (born 25 August 1955) is a Welsh former footballer who played primarily as a left back. Born in Oswestry, England, Tibbott came through the Ipswich Town youth team winning the FA Youth Cup in 1973 before making his league debut in 1976. Tibbott contributed to Ipswich's victorious 1977-78 FA Cup campaign, making one appearance during the run against Cardiff City in the third round. However he was not part of the squad for the final itself. Winning two Wales under-21 caps while at Portman Road, Tibbot eventually signed for Sheffield United for £100,000 in March 1979.

Tibbott became a regular in the United side, playing in either defence or midfield, but the club were in decline and suffered two relegations during the period he was with them. With United now in Division Four, Tibbott started the 1980–81 season as first choice in midfield but becoming increasingly injury prone he was sidelined in September 1980 and failed to make another competitive appearance for the club.

Tibbot retired from playing in 1981 but made a brief return in 1985 when he became player-manager of Finnish side TP-Seinäjoki. He returned to Suffolk, playing for Stowmarket Town, before becoming assistant manager at Hadleigh United, also running a taxi firm in the town.
