= Mick Lambert =

English footballer and cricketer

Personal information
- Full name: Michael Arnold Lambert
- Date of birth: 20 May 1950 (age 76)
- Place of birth: Balsham, England
- Height: 5 ft 8 in (1.73 m)
- Position: Winger

Senior career*
Years	Team	Apps	(Gls)
1967–1968	Newmarket Town		
1968–1979	Ipswich Town	210	(39)
1978	→ Vancouver Whitecaps (loan)	3	(0)
1979–1980	Peterborough United	21	(2)
1980–1981	Eastern AA		
1981–1982	Chelmsford City	2	(0)
Total		236	(41)
- * Club domestic league appearances and goals

Michael Arnold Lambert (born 20 May 1950) is an English former footballer who played as a winger. He started his career with Newmarket Town before becoming a professional and played for both Ipswich Town and Peterborough United.

While at school, Lambert played tennis and cricket. He was coached tennis at Cambridge University and won the Cambridge under 15s tournament two years running as well as the Hunstanton Open two years running and the Hertfordshire Open. He also won a prize from the Sunday Express after scoring a hundred at cricket and managed to get a job as one of the groundstaff at Lord's, where he worked for four years. He once represented England as twelfth man against the West Indies and although he didn't get to field at any point, he did carry the drinks on and got to meet Muhammad Ali in the opposition's dressing room.

At 15 he played for the youth team of Cambridge City F.C. and then ended up at Newmarket Town. In 1967, Ipswich Town watched him in a semi-final against Stowmarket Town and asked him to play for their youth team the following week, a 4–0 win over Crystal Palace. A few days later, he played in the Southern Junior Floodlight Cup for Ipswich against West Ham United where he scored in a 2–1 defeat in the home first leg. They won 2–1 in the second leg and shared the cup.

Whilst playing for Ipswich, he made 210 appearances, and played as a substitute in the 1978 FA Cup Final. He ended his professional career with Peterborough United.

Lambert also played cricket at minor counties level for Cambridgeshire from 1968 to 1979, making five appearances in the Minor Counties Championship. He also fielded as twelfth man for Nottinghamshire under Garry Sobers.

== Honours ==
Ipswich Town

- FA Cup: 1977–78

Individual

- Ipswich Town Hall of Fame: Inducted 2015
