= Martyn Rogers =

English footballer and manager

Personal information
- Date of birth: 7 March 1955 (age 71)
- Place of birth: Bristol, England
- Position: Defender

Youth career
- 1973–1974: Bristol City

Senior career*
Years	Team	Apps	(Gls)
1974–1979	Bath City		
1979–1985	Exeter City	131	(5)
1986	Weymouth	132	(?)
1987–1993	Tiverton Town		

Managerial career
- 1992–2010: Tiverton Town
- 2011: Weymouth
- 2014–2023: Tiverton Town
- * Club domestic league appearances and goals

Martyn Rogers (born 7 March 1955) is an English former professional footballer and manager who played as a defender and most recently was manager of Tiverton Town.

== Career ==
Rogers was born in Bristol. His playing career included spells at Exeter City and Bristol City. In 1992, he was appointed player-manager of non-league Tiverton Town where he remained as manager until 21 May 2010 having tendered his resignation on 18 May 2010.

Earlier in 2010, he met Manchester United manager Sir Alex Ferguson as part of the celebrations surrounding his 1,000th game in charge of Tiverton - a feat shared by Ferguson.

On 15 June 2010, it was announced that newly promoted Premier League side Blackpool would visit Ladysmead to celebrate Rogers 20 years in charge. A team selected by Rogers will face Ian Holloway's strongest eleven, and will be the first game they play as a Premier League side. The match took place on Friday 16 July and was Rogers testimonial match.

After being in charge of the club for over 1,000 games, Martyn Rogers tendered his resignation as manager of Tiverton Town on 18 May 2010, to take effect from 21 May. Chris Vinnicombe was appointed manager at a Ladysmead press conference on 7 June.

On 15 January 2011, Rogers returned to management when he was named new manager of Weymouth. He successfully avoided relegation from the 2010-11 Southern League Premier Division by just two points, despite having a ten-point deduction. Rogers left Weymouth on 20 May 2011 after failing to agree on a budget for next season.

Rogers joined Southern League Division One South and West side Taunton Town as assistant-manager in August 2012 after he was out of the game for two years.

In May 2013, he joined Devon FA as Commercial Manager. In May 2014, he re-joined Tiverton Town as manager following the resignation of John Clarkson. On October 12, 2023, Rogers parted ways with Tiverton Town.
