= Playford Road (training ground) =

Football training ground in Suffolk, England

- Interactive map of Playford Road
- Location: Rushmere St Andrew, Ipswich
- Coordinates: 52.067556°N 1.213289°E
- Owner: Gamechanger 20 Limited
- Type: Sports facility

Construction
- Built: c. 2001
- Opened: 2001

Playford Road, located near Rushmere St Andrew, in Ipswich, is the training ground of Ipswich Town Football Club.

== History ==
Playford Road was officially opened in 2001. In addition to multiple pitches, the initial development of the training ground also included a dome housing an indoor pitch, with new buildings also being constructed including a canteen, players' lounge, parents' lounge, recreation room, classroom, changing rooms and office accommodation.

In 2018, a new state of the art gym was installed at Playford Road. Further development work was done during 2019, with new improvements made to the medical facilities, including the installation of a £90k recovery suite, £100k was also spent on installing new fencing around the complex, as well as general up keeping work.

Following the club's sale to US-based group Gamechanger 20 in April 2021, Playford Road also became property of the new owners. A small unused section of the ground remained under the ownership of Marcus Evans, where the EADT has reported he intends on building a new housing development.

== Facilities ==
The Playford Road complex includes a wide range of facilities for both the first-team and academy, including a gym, recovery suite, canteen, players' lounge, parents' lounge, recreation room, classroom, changing rooms and office accommodation. The training ground also includes 11 pitches of various specifications, including four full-size grass pitches, four medium-size grass pitches, one medium-size floodlit grass pitch, one full-size floodlit artificial 3G pitch and one indoor medium-size artificial 3G pitch, located within the dome.
