= Steve Leahy =

English footballer

Personal information
- Full name: Stephen David Leahy
- Date of birth: 23 September 1959 (age 67)
- Place of birth: Battersea, England
- Position: Forward

Youth career
- Crystal Palace

Senior career*
Years	Team	Apps	(Gls)
1976–1982	Crystal Palace	4	(0)
1982	Gravesend & Northfleet	?	(?)
1982	Dartford	8	(3)

International career
1975	England Schoolboys	9	(7)
- * Club domestic league appearances and goals

Stephen David Leahy (born 23 September 1959 in Battersea) is an English former professional footballer who played in the Football League, as a forward. He began his career at Crystal Palace where he was part of the youth team which won the FA Youth Cup in 1977. He signed professional terms in October 1976 but his first team opportunities were limited and in April 1982 after only four league appearances he moved on to Dartford.
