= Ian T. Smith =

British lawyer

Ian T. Smith is an English lawyer who is the Clifford Chance Professor of Employment Law at the University of East Anglia. He taught at the Universities of Canterbury, (Christchurch) and Exeter before coming to the UEA Law School when it opened in 1977. He was called to the Bar (Gray's Inn) in 1972 and is a member of Devereux Chambers in the Middle Temple specialising in employment and industrial relations law. He is also an editor of the key employment practitioners' text Harvey on Industrial Relations and Employment Law and also writes the monthly bulletin associated with the text.

== Bibliography ==
- Contract Actions in Modern Employment Law (Butterworths London 2002) (with N Randall)
- Halsbury's Laws of England, Vols 16 (1A) and 16 (1B), Title ‘Employment’ (2005)
- Halsbury's Laws of England, Vol 47 (Trade, Industry and Industrial Relations), 4th ed (2001 Reissue), pp. 471–853. (With G Thomas)
- Smith and Wood on Employment Law (9th edn OUP Oxford 2007) (with G Thomas)
