= 1978 FA Cup final =

Football match between Arsenal and Ipswich Town

- Match programme cover
- Event: 1977–78 FA Cup
Arsenal	Ipswich Town
0	1
- Date: 6 May 1978
- Venue: Wembley Stadium, London
- Referee: Derek Nippard (Dorset)
- Attendance: 100,000

The 1978 FA Cup final was an association football match between Arsenal and Ipswich Town on 6 May 1978 at the old Wembley Stadium, London. It was the final match of the 1977–78 FA Cup, the 97th season of the world's oldest football knockout competition, the FA Cup. Four-time winners Arsenal were appearing in their ninth final, whereas Ipswich Town were making their debut at Wembley and in their first FA Cup final. Each team had progressed through five rounds to reach the final. Ipswich had needed a replay in the fifth round to proceed past Bristol Rovers while Arsenal won all of their ties at the first time of asking and went into the final as clear favourites.

The game was watched by a stadium crowd of around 100,000 and was broadcast live on television and radio. Ipswich dominated the match, hitting the woodwork three times (including twice from John Wark) before Roger Osborne scored the only goal of the game with a left-foot shot, as Ipswich triumphed 1–0. It remains Ipswich Town's only FA Cup triumph to date and they have not appeared in the final since. Arsenal returned to Wembley the following season and won the 1979 FA Cup Final over Manchester United.

== Route to the final ==
The FA Cup is English football's primary cup competition. Clubs in the highest tier of English football enter the FA Cup in the third round and are selected randomly out of a hat with the remaining clubs. If a match is drawn, a replay comes into force, ordinarily at the ground of the team who were away for the first game. As with league fixtures, FA Cup matches are subject to change in the event of games being selected for television coverage and this often can be influenced by clashes with other competitions.

=== Arsenal ===
Round	Opposition	Score
3rd	Sheffield United (a)	5–0
4th	Wolverhampton Wanderers (h)	2–1
5th	Walsall (h)	4–1
6th	Wrexham (a)	3–2
Semi-final	Orient (n)	3–0
Key: (h) = Home venue; (a) = Away venue; (n) = Neutral venue

Arsenal entered the 1977–78 FA Cup in the third round where they faced Second Division team Sheffield United at Bramall Lane. Four goals in a ten-minute spell in the first half, from David O'Leary, Malcolm Macdonald (2) and Frank Stapleton, effectively ended the match as a contest. United had missed a penalty after O'Leary's opener and conceded a fifth to Stapleton in the second half, as Arsenal proceeded to the fourth round with a 5–0 victory. Wolverhampton Wanderers were Arsenal's fourth round opponents at Highbury. In front of a crowd of nearly 50,000, Wolves made the better start but Alan Sunderland's header from a Macdonald cross gave Arsenal a lead against the run of play. Kenny Hibbitt equalised but the game was decided in the final minutes when Wolves' defender Bob Hazell was sent off; Macdonald scored the winner seconds later. The fifth round saw Arsenal drawn at home against Walsall, against whom, in the 1932–33 FA Cup they had lost 2–0 in what is regarded as one of the greatest FA Cup upsets in the history of the competition. The upset was not repeated as Arsenal won 4–1 with goals from Stapleton (2), Macdonald and Sunderland; Alan Buckley scored the consolation for Walsall.

Welsh third-tier side Wrexham were Arsenal's sixth round opponents, the match taking place in front of 25,000 supporters at the Racecourse Ground. An early header from Wrexham's prolific striker Dixie McNeil went wide of Pat Jennings' post and 25 minutes in, Macdonald tapped home after Stapleton's header was parried by Wrexham goalkeeper Eddie Niedzwiecki. Wrexham increased their tempo and were denied by the referee as he disallowed a Bobby Shinton goal for offside. The Welsh side equalised midway through the second half, with a McNeil header, his eleventh goal of his FA Cup campaign. Arsenal quickly retook the lead through a Sunderland header, and extended it to 3–1 in the 73rd minute after a Liam Brady slice was delicately finished by Willie Young. Graham Whittle pulled one back for Wrexham with ten minutes to go but the match ended 3–2 and Arsenal were through. The semi-final, played at Chelsea's Stamford Bridge as a neutral venue, was against lower-league Orient who had already knocked out First Division teams Norwich City, Chelsea and Middlesbrough. Arsenal took the lead in the fifteenth minute through a deflected Macdonald strike, and doubled their advantage three minutes later as Macdonald scored again, this time courtesy of a deflection by Orient defender Glenn Roeder. Graham Rix extended the North London club's lead midway through the second half to see Arsenal into the final as 3–0 victors.

=== Ipswich Town ===
Round	Opposition	Score
3rd	Cardiff City (a)	2–0
4th	Hartlepool United (h)	4–1
5th	Bristol Rovers (a)	2–2
5th	Bristol Rovers (h)	3–0
6th	Millwall (a)	6–1
Semi-final	West Bromwich Albion (n)	3–1
Key: (h) = Home venue; (a) = Away venue; (n) = Neutral venue

Ipswich's first game in the 1977–78 FA Cup was away at Second Division Welsh club Cardiff City in the third round. As Ipswich were in a poor run of form both domestically and in European competition, manager Bobby Robson had declared the FA Cup contest against Cardiff as "the most important match the club is going to play this season". Ipswich won the match 2–0 with both goals coming from Paul Mariner, the England international centre forward. The match also saw captain Mick Mills making his 494th appearance for Ipswich, a club record. Ipswich were drawn against Fourth Division Hartlepool United in the fourth round. A controversial penalty awarded to Ipswich in the sixth minute was converted by Colin Viljoen after Derrick Downing was adjudged to have fouled Mariner. Ipswich extended their lead with a second from Mariner before Downing pulled one back for Hartlepool. Second half goals from Brian Talbot and Viljoen ended the tie 4–1 in favour of the East Anglian team who progressed to the fifth round where they faced Bristol Rovers. The game was played on a frozen Eastville Stadium pitch and the lower league team came into the match against Ipswich having lost just two of their previous fourteen matches. A Talbot throw-in was collected by Clive Woods whose cross was converted by Robin Turner. Rovers' equaliser came early in the second half as Ipswich goalkeeper Paul Cooper failed to clear a corner which was subsequently headed in by midfielder David Williams. Fifteen minutes later, the Bristol club took the lead, Williams scoring after a Russell Osman clearance. Bobby Gould then scored for Rovers but the goal was disallowed and with four minutes to go, Mariner secured an equaliser to send the game to a replay at Portman Road. Ipswich pressed early on but with no reward for their domination and had to wait until the 26th minute to capitalise. A corner from Woods was converted by Mick Mills at the far post. As Rovers went in search of an equaliser, Mariner scored following good passing work from Allan Hunter and Mills. Woods scored a third with ten minutes remaining to end the match 3–0 and send Ipswich into the sixth round to face Millwall.

The match at The Den had just commenced when George Burley's speculative effort found the back of the Millwall net prompting violence in the terraces. The fighting spilled onto the pitch and forced a 17-minute delay in the match, after which Ipswich continued to dominate but could not extend their lead. Early in the second half, a goal-line clearance from Millwall's Jon Moore fell to Mariner who finished it to double Ipswich's lead. Mariner scored again with fifteen minutes to go, tapping in from a Turner cross. Dave Mehmet pulled one back for Millwall after a Barry Kitchener effort was saved by Cooper, but Ipswich then scored three times in as many minutes. Wark, Talbot and Mariner (completing his hat-trick) added to the scoreline which ended 6–1 and Ipswich progressed. The semi-final, against West Bromwich Albion, was played at Arsenal's Highbury as a neutral venue. The opening goal came from a diving header: Talbot displayed "outrageous bravery" to score at the near post from a Mills cross. Injured in doing so, Talbot was forced to withdraw from the match and sustained three stitches and concussion. Ipswich extended their lead in the 21st minute after Cyrille Regis failed to clear a Mick Lambert corner which was turned in by Mills. Hunter gave away a penalty with less than thirteen minutes to go which was duly converted by Tony Brown but Wark restored the two-goal lead with a late header from a Woods corner. The match ended 3–1 and Ipswich had qualified for their first ever FA Cup final and first visit to Wembley Stadium.

== Pre-match ==
Arsenal were appearing in the final of the FA Cup for the first time since their defeat to Leeds United in the 1972 final. They had won the cup on four other occasions (in 1930, 1936, 1950 and 1971) and were making their ninth appearance in the FA Cup final overall.

Ipswich were considered underdogs: bookmaker William Hill offered odds of 9/4 on an Ipswich win and evens on an Arsenal win the day before the match. David Lacey, writing in The Guardian, suggested that Arsenal were favourites to win because of doubts over the fitness of Ipswich defender Allan Hunter and the mediocre league form of the East Anglian club during the 1977–78 season which saw Ipswich finish eighteenth, while Arsenal ended in fifth position. The Reading Evening Post also considered Ipswich to be underdogs, noting that Arsenal had won three of their last four matches, while Ipswich were "bludgeoned by injury" and had lost 6–1 in their last match against Aston Villa. Bobby Robson was content with the underdog label: "Being the underdogs helps ease the tension and that suits us fine ... Arsenal seem to be most people's choice this time, but that does not worry us in the least."

The final was televised by the BBC as part of their Grandstand show. David Coleman was the main commentator for the BBC with punditry from Jimmy Hill, Lawrie McMenemy and Trevor Brooking. ITV also broadcast the match live in its World of Sport programme, and BBC Radio 2 provided radio commentary. Although two days of rain had preceded the final, the conditions were good for the match with sunny skies. Before the match, the players were presented to Princess Alexandra, The Honourable Lady Ogilvy, and her husband Angus Ogilvy.

== Match ==
=== Summary ===
The match, the fiftieth FA Cup final held at Wembley, kicked off in warm sunshine in front of a crowd of around 100,000, refereed by Derek Nippard. Arsenal kicked off and were initially dominant with an O'Leary shot past the post from an Alan Hudson cross. At the other end, a Mariner strike from a Woods header beat Jennings' dive but was off-target. After fifteen minutes, Talbot was beginning to establish himself as the main power in midfield. Along with Kevin Beattie making runs from defence, Ipswich began to over-run their opposing midfielders Liam Brady and Hudson, forcing them to play deeper in their own half. Twenty-year-old David Geddis caused the Arsenal left side of defence problems, passing to Woods on the right side of the pitch whose cross was missed by Osborne but struck well by Mariner only for him to see it ricochet off the bar. Geddis then saw his bouncing shot saved by Jennings and Arsenal's Macdonald cleared another attempt. The first half ended goalless. In the 52nd minute, Mariner set Wark up by the edge of the Arsenal penalty area: the Scotsman's firm shot struck the upright, once again leaving Jennings stranded. O'Leary initiated a rare attack for the London club and created an opportunity for Sunderland who saw the ball saved at his feet by Ipswich's goalkeeper Cooper. Brady was substituted in the 65th minute for Rix. Woods and Talbot then combined to set Wark up once again but his first-time shot rebounded off the post. It was Burley's turn next to trouble the Arsenal goal: his header from Woods' cross produced an exceptional save from Jennings to keep the scores level at 0–0. With thirteen minutes left, Geddis took the ball and advanced towards the opposition penalty area, and drove in a low shot at a difficult angle. Arsenal's Young stuck out a foot to defend it and deflected the ball to Roger Osborne who shot past Jennings with a first-time left-footed shot from 10 yards (9.1 m) to put Ipswich ahead. Osborne was soon substituted for Lambert and Ipswich continued to dominate the game until the final whistle.

=== Details ===
6 May 1978
15:00 BST

Arsenal	0–1	Ipswich Town
	(Report) (Teams)	Osborne 77'

Wembley, London
Attendance: 100,000
Referee: Derek Nippard (Dorset)

Arsenal	Ipswich

GK	1	(Northern Ireland) Pat Jennings
DF	2	(Northern Ireland) Pat Rice (c)
DF	3	(Northern Ireland) Sammy Nelson
MF	4	(England) David Price
DF	5	(Republic of Ireland) David O'Leary
DF	6	(Scotland) Willie Young
MF	7	(Republic of Ireland) Liam Brady	(substituted off) 65'
MF	8	(England) Alan Sunderland
FW	9	(England) Malcolm Macdonald
FW	10	(Republic of Ireland) Frank Stapleton
MF	11	(England) Alan Hudson
Substitute:
MF	12	(England) Graham Rix	(substituted on) 65'
Manager:
(Northern Ireland) Terry Neill

GK	1	(England) Paul Cooper
DF	2	(Scotland) George Burley
DF	3	(England) Mick Mills (c)
MF	4	(England) Brian Talbot
DF	5	(Northern Ireland) Allan Hunter
DF	6	(England) Kevin Beattie
MF	7	(England) Roger Osborne	(substituted off) 78'
MF	8	(Scotland) John Wark
FW	9	(England) Paul Mariner
FW	10	(England) David Geddis
FW	11	(England) Clive Woods
Substitute:
MF	12	(England) Mick Lambert	(substituted on) 78'
Manager:
(England) Bobby Robson

Match rules

- 90 minutes.
- 30 minutes of extra-time if necessary.
- Replay if scores still level.
- One named substitute.

== Post-match ==
Ipswich's manager Bobby Robson was delighted: "What a day for us. We deserved it. We played some decent football didn't we?" While he singled out Mariner for particular praise, Robson noted "the whole team played well ... everything went right for us". Osborne later revealed that his substitution came about as a result of him being overcome with emotion and feeling faint having scored the late goal. Arsenal manager Terry Neill was less positive about his team's performance: "I am not going to say very much ... then I'm going to piss off to have a drink". He went on to compliment Ipswich, noting that "we didn't play as well as we can do, but Ipswich deserved it today, no doubt about that". Arsenal captain Pat Rice apologised to fans stating that Arsenal were "lucky to escape with just a 1–0 defeat".

As of 2025 it remains Ipswich Town's only FA Cup triumph and they have not appeared in the final since, although they did appear in the semi-finals three years later. Their only major trophy since then is the UEFA Cup in 1981. As of 2026, Arsenal hold the record for the most appearances in the FA Cup final (21) and the most FA Cup final wins (14).

Ipswich's Brian Talbot would transfer to Arsenal before the start of the next season. When Arsenal reached the 1979 final, Talbot joined a rare group of players to play against and for the same club in consecutive finals.
