= Colin Gregson =

English footballer

Personal information
- Full name: Colin Gregson
- Date of birth: 19 January 1958 (age 68)
- Place of birth: Newcastle upon Tyne, England
- Position: Midfielder

Senior career*
Years	Team	Apps	(Gls)
1974–1977	West Bromwich Albion	0	(0)
1977–1979	Sheffield Wednesday	2	(0)
1979–1981	Berwick Rangers	9	(0)
1981	Blyth Spartans		
1981–1982	West Adelaide Hawks	3	(0)
- * Club domestic league appearances and goals

Colin Gregson (born 19 January 1958) is an English former professional footballer and FA Youth Cup winner who played in the Football League for Sheffield Wednesday and in the Scottish League for Berwick Rangers.

== Early life ==
In 1969, whilst playing in a cup final for Wyndham Primary School, Gregson was noticed by Coventry City scout, Jimmy Nichol. At the end of the match Nichol approached Gregson's father with an invitation for his son to take part in trials at the club during the school summer holidays of that year. Gregson took part in the trials and was accompanied to Coventry by his father. He repeated his trials with the club during the Easter holidays of 1970.

Gregson represented various youth clubs including Newcastle City Boy's (1969–74), Newbiggin Hall Boy's Club (1971–72) and Montagu & North Fenham Boy's Club (1972–74) being the club his father, Gordon, had played for 1949–50.

In 1971 Gregson was noticed by West Bromwich Albion scout, Bill Emery and was invited to take part in trials at the club during the Christmas holidays of that year. In 1972, after having had trials with Newcastle United and Sunderland, he signed Associated Schoolboy Forms with WBA which prevented other clubs from approaching him. He regularly took part in trials at the club until he left school in 1974.

In late 1972, whilst representing Montagu & North Fenham Boy's Club, Gregson took part in a televised penalty competition held at St James' Park and scored 6 out of 10 penalties against the Newcastle United goalkeeper, Iam McFaul. The show was later broadcast on Tyne Tees Television's sports programme, "Sportstime", presented by George Taylor.

== Club career ==
=== West Bromwich Albion ===
On 1 July 1974, Gregson joined West Bromwich Albion, then recently relegated to Division Two and managed by Don Howe, as an Apprentice Professional. At the end of his first season he helped WBA win the Midland Intermediate Cup by scoring in the 1st leg of the final (1-1) against Shrewsbury Town at the Hawthorns. In May, 1975, he was a member of the Albion squad that took part in the International Youth Tournament held in Augsburg, Germany. At the end of the season, Don Howe's contract with WBA expired and was not renewed. He was replaced by the ex-Leeds United and Republic of Ireland midfielder, John Giles, as player manager.

The 1975–76 season saw Gregson, as a 17-year-old, immediately become a regular in Albion's reserve team and in one Central League match (20 December 1975) at Burnley, he scored the equaliser in a 2–2 draw with a 25-yard shot whilst playing alongside the ex-England legend, Geoff Hurst, recently signed from Stoke City. It was reported, "Gregson's 79th minute equaliser - a dipping shot 25 yards out, hammered in after he had cut in from the right, came just one minute after Burnley had taken the 2–1 lead their play during the second half had merited" also "and then came Gregson's spectacular equaliser".

During the same season Gregson represented West Bromwich Albion in trials, held at, Lilleshall, Shropshire, for the England Youth Team (U18). He later signed full professional forms with the club, 20 January 1976.

Gregson was a key player for Albion's youth team during their FA Youth Cup winning campaign of 1975–76. Before defeating Wolverhampton Wanderers in the two-legged final, Albion had already defeated Coventry City, Charlton Athletic, Ipswich Town, Manchester United and Crystal Palace. In the 3rd round home tie (15 December 1975) when Albion were a goal down and with only 30 minutes of the game remaining, Gregson scored a hat-trick against Charlton Athletic, to ensure Albion reached the 4th round. It was reported, "But then Gregson took over. He equalised in the 60th minute with a brilliant solo effort, beating three men before shooting past the keeper". During the 5th round tie against Manchester United at The Hawthorns, (Tuesday, 9 March 1976) it was reported, "Summerfield's equaliser was again the result of a Lynex cross with Colin Gregson setting up the goal with a brilliant pass from midfield". During the first leg of the semi-final clash (Monday, 29 March 1976) at home to Crystal Palace, Gregson created two of Albion's goals from a corner and a free kick and also scored with a penalty in the resulting 3–2 win. In the first leg of the final (Tuesday, 27 April 1976) at Wolverhampton Wanderers, he created the first goal, scored by Kevin Summerfield, with a defence-splitting pass and was voted man of the match. Albion went on to win the match 2–0 and secured the trophy, for the first and only time in the club's history, with a 3–0 win in the second leg at the Hawthorns (Monday, 3 May 1976).

Towards the end of the season, Gregson made his debut in Albion's first team during a private friendly against Crewe Alexandra at the Hawthorns. The match was arranged by John Giles to enable him to observe how some of Albion's younger players performed against more senior players.

At the end of the season WBA had won the FA Youth Cup, finished second to Liverpool in the Central League, and gained promotion back to Division One.

The 1976–77 season saw Gregson continue as a regular in Albion's reserve team and towards the end of the season Sheffield Wednesday, then in Division Three and managed by Len Ashurst, expressed an interest in him. Peterborough United, then also in Division Three and managed by the ex-Vice President of the League Managers Association, John Barnwell, also expressed an interest in signing him and invited him to play for Peterborough in a home friendly match (12 May 1977) against Nottingham Forest, then in Division Two and managed by Brian Clough. The full-strength Forest team featured players such as Ian Bowyer and the future England International, Tony Woodcock. Gregson played the full 90 minutes of the match and within weeks Forest had gained promotion back to the First Division. Within two years they had won the First Division Title and the European Championship.

=== Sheffield Wednesday ===
Gregson eventually chose to sign for Sheffield Wednesday and made his first appearance for the club Saturday, 20 August 1977 during a Central League match at Sheffield United. It was reported, "Gregson, the newcomer from West Brom, was playing extremely well in midfield for Wednesday, he was instrumental in breaking up many of the dangerous home attacks".

Tuesday, 30 August 1977, saw him make his debut, as a 19-year-old, in the first team during a League Cup match away at Blackpool (score 2–2). Wednesday's second goal of the match occurred after Gregson challenged Blackpool's goalkeeper who, under pressure from the challenge, dropped the ball to enable another Wednesday player to score. It was reported, "Colin Gregson was drafted into the team in place of the injured Rodger Wylde and made a promising debut". He went on to make his debut in the Football League, Saturday 1 October 1977 away at Portsmouth (score 2–2). However, on 5 October 1977, Len Ashurst was sacked by Wednesday, and reserve team coach, Ken Knighton, appointed as caretaker manager.

After the appointment of the new manager, Jack Charlton, Gregson made one further appearance in the first team as a second-half substitute away at Exeter City (score 1–1), and although he never featured in the new manager's future plans, he continued to perform to a high standard, as demonstrated by various match reports, in the reserve team. During one match, Saturday, 4 March 1978, giving Wednesday a 2–1 victory, he scored both goals passed the Manchester United goalkeeper, Alex Stepney, who had played for United during the 1968 European Cup Final. It was reported, "Wednesday's first goal was rocketed into the net by Gregson" and "Gregson crowned a workmanlike performance with the winner (a header created from a cross by the ex-WBA & Scottish International, Bobby Hope) five minutes from the end".

At the beginning of the 1978–79 season Maurice Setters was appointed as Wednesday's new reserve team coach after the departure of Ken Knighton to manage Sunderland. During an away match at Derby County,"Gregson fired in an unstoppable drive from 30 yards which left County's goalkeeper bemused and rooted to his line".

During a later match, Gregson scored the winner to give Wednesday a 3–2 victory over Everton. It was reported, "Colin Gregson's brilliant 80th minute header gave impressive Wednesday their ninth successive win after they had trailed 0–2 after 15 minutes".

On 13 March 1979, Gregson played for Wednesday's reserve team in an away match at Manchester City. The City team featured the former England international, Colin Bell MBE, and the Polish International, Kaziu Deyna, who had played for Poland during the 1974 World Cup Finals.

=== Denmark ===
In May 1979, Gregson left Sheffield Wednesday and spent a week in Denmark training with Randers Freja, managed by ex-Aston Villa coach, Frank Upton. Upton had made the invitation to Gregson after travelling to England to watch him play. At the end of his stay, Gregson expected to be offered a two-year contract but the deal was never finalised due to the apparent abrupt departure from the club by Upton.

=== Berwick Rangers ===
After returning to the UK, Gregson was invited for a trial with Berwick Rangers who had then just gained promotion to the Scottish First Division (now the Scottish Championship). After impressing during a pre-season friendly at Galashiels, he was offered a two-year contract by player/manager, Dave Smith. He made his debut for the club, Saturday 28 July 1979, against Glasgow Rangers at Ibrox Park in the 1st round of the Drybrough Cup. He made his debut in the Scottish Football League, Saturday 11 August, against Airdrie. He missed three months of the season due to sustaining a serious knee injury but later returned for a match at Arbroath, 1 December 1979, when it was reported, "In the midfield Gregson was the pick. Despite not having played competitively for 12 weeks he filled the gap left by Jim Morton's departure with admirable success. A player who likes to get involved in things, he might prove to be more effective than Morton has this season". The match was broadcast the following day as the main match on Scottish Television's sports programme, "Scotsport". Gregson made his last appearance for Berwick, Saturday, 20 August 1980, during a Scottish League Cup fixture against Aberdeen. Shortly afterwards he requested that his contract with the club be terminated by mutual consent, due to the excessive travelling involved from his home in Newcastle to away games in Scotland. He then had a short spell with local non-league club, Blyth Spartans.

=== Australia ===
In 1981, Gregson joined Australian National League club, West Adelaide, then managed by Englishman Billy Birch, but by the time Gregson arrived at the club Birch had been sacked and replaced by Yugoslavian coach, Peter Jaksa. After an away match at South Melbourne, which involved a return journey by plane, it was reported, "New English import Gregson, went on against South for the last 20 minutes and impressed". Jaksa was also quoted, with reference to the next match, as saying, "I must also seriously consider fielding Colin Gregson from the kick-off this time, Gregson looks good but he is still not fully fit". The South Melbourne team featured the ex-Wolverhampton Wanderers, Liverpool & Aston Villa striker, Alun Evans.

== Honours ==
West Bromwich Albion

- FA Youth Cup winners: 1976
