= Ian Smith (footballer, born 1957) =

English footballer

Personal information
- Full name: Ian Ralph Smith
- Date of birth: 15 February 1957 (age 69)
- Place of birth: Rotherham, England
- Position: Fullback

Senior career*
Years	Team	Apps	(Gls)
1974–1976	Tottenham Hotspur	2	(0)
1976–?	Rotherham United	4	(0)
	Bishop's Stortford	?	(?)

International career
1975	England Youth	9	(0)
- * Club domestic league appearances and goals

Ian Ralph Smith (born 15 February 1957) is an English former professional footballer who played for Tottenham Hotspur, Rotherham United, Bishop's Stortford and represented England at youth level.

== Playing career ==
Smith joined Tottenham Hotspur as an apprentice in April 1974. The full back went on to make two first team appearances for the Lilies in 1975. He transferred to Rotherham United in June 1976 where he featured in four matches. Smith went on to have a spell at non-league Bishops Stortford.

== Post-football career ==
Smith became assistant academy director at Ipswich Town. He left the Portman Road club by mutual agreement in April 2004.
