= Tommy Parkin =

English footballer

Personal information
- Full name: Thomas Aitchison Parkin
- Date of birth: 1 February 1956 (age 70)
- Place of birth: Gateshead, England
- Height: 5 ft 7 in (1.70 m)
- Position: Midfielder

Youth career
- Ipswich Town

Senior career*
Years	Team	Apps	(Gls)
1973–1987	Ipswich Town	70	(0)
1975–1976	→ Grimsby Town (loan)	6	(0)
1976–1977	→ Peterborough United (loan)	3	(0)
1977	→ Connecticut Bicentennials (loan)	17	(2)
1987–1990	Bury Town		
1990	Wivenhoe Town	11	(0)
Total		107	(2)
- * Club domestic league appearances and goals

Thomas Aitchison Parkin (born 1 February 1956) is an English retired professional football midfielder. His nephews, Jacob Murphy and Josh Murphy, also became professional footballers.

== Career ==
Born in Gateshead, Parkin spent his youth career with Ipswich Town winning the FA Youth Cup in 1973 and turning professional with Ipswich in the December. He was sent out on loan to Grimsby Town during the 1975–76 season and then to Peterborough United the following season. Later in 1977 he was loaned to Connecticut Bicentennials of the North American Soccer League. He made his Ipswich debut against Cardiff City in the third round of the FA Cup on 7 January 1978. Ipswich went on to win the FA Cup that season but Parkin wasn't part of the squad for the final itself. Parkin had made fewer than 20 first team appearances by the age of 27.

Despite becoming a first team regular during the 1983–84 season, Parkin soon returned to being a reserve player. His final appearance for Ipswich was a League Cup defeat to Cambridge United, and he left he club in 1987. He subsequently joined Bury Town, where he played until 1990. Parkin joined Wivenhoe Town in the summer of 1990, playing 11 games until departing in September of that year for Harwich & Parkeston.
