= Roger Osborne =

English footballer

Personal information
- Full name: Roger Charles Osborne
- Date of birth: 9 March 1950 (age 76)
- Place of birth: Otley, Suffolk, England
- Position: Midfielder

Senior career*
Years	Team	Apps	(Gls)
1970–1981	Ipswich Town	124	(10)
1979	→ Detroit Express (loan)	22	(2)
1981–1986	Colchester United	206	(11)
- Sudbury Town
- Braintree Town
- Felixstowe Port & Town
- Westerfield
Total		352	(22)
- * Club domestic league appearances and goals

Roger Charles Osborne (born 9 March 1950) is an English former professional footballer who is best known for scoring the winning goal in the 1978 FA Cup Final.

== Biography ==
Born in Otley, Suffolk in 1950, Osborne was signed by Ipswich Town from Suffolk & Ipswich League club Westerfield United in October 1970. He made his league debut on 27 October 1973 against Wolverhampton Wanderers at Portman Road, Ipswich Town winning 2–0.

In 1978, he was part of the Ipswich team that won the FA Cup against Arsenal, scoring the winning goal in the 77th minute, in a 1–0 victory. His celebration upon scoring the winning goal caused him to faint and be substituted with only ten minutes of the match remaining. In 1979, he was loaned to NASL side Detroit Express, for whom he played 22 matches. Osborne played his final game for Ipswich on 15 November 1980 in a league match against Leicester City.

In 1981, he moved to Colchester United where he played out until 1986, making over 200 appearances. After retiring from professional football, he worked as a lorry driver and at the Willis Faber Sports Centre in Rushmere St Andrew, which was run by former Colchester manager Dick Graham. He also played for non-League clubs Sudbury Town, Braintree Town, Felixstowe Port & Town and SIL club Westerfield, whom he also managed.

Osborne became the manager of the sports centre, now known as the Ipswich School Sports Centre (ISSC) Sports Centre but is now retired.

== Honours ==
Ipswich Town

- FA Cup: 1977–78

Individual

- PFA Team of the Year: 1981–82 Fourth Division
- Colchester United Player of the Year: 1985–86
- Ipswich Town Hall of Fame: Inducted 2010
