= 1977–78 FA Cup =

Tournament details
- Country: England; Wales

Final positions
- Champions: Ipswich Town (1st title)
- Runners-up: Arsenal

Tournament statistics
- Top goal scorer(s): Dixie McNeil (11 goals)

The 1977–78 FA Cup was the 97th season of the world's oldest knockout football competition, the Football Association Challenge Cup, or FA Cup. The final saw Ipswich Town defeat Arsenal 1–0, with a goal from Roger Osborne.

== Qualifying rounds ==
Most participating clubs that were not members of the Football League competed in the qualifying rounds to secure one of 28 places available in the first round.

The winners from the fourth qualifying round were Blyth Spartans, Wigan Athletic, Spennymoor United, Mossley, Stafford Rangers, Burscough, Runcorn, Goole Town, Arnold, Burton Albion, Nuneaton Borough, AP Leamington, Kettering Town, Enderby Town, Boreham Wood, Enfield, Leatherhead, Barnet, Tilbury, Lowestoft Town, Folkestone & Shepway, Hendon, Wealdstone, Tooting & Mitcham United, Bideford, Minehead, Weymouth and Bath City.

Enderby Town was the only non-league club appearing in the competition proper for the first time. Of the others, Mossley had last featured at this stage in 1969–70, Arnold and Lowestoft Town had last done so in 1967-68, Folkestone & Shepway had last done so in 1966-67, Burton Albion in 1965-66, Burscough in 1959-60 and Tilbury in 1949-50.

Blyth Spartans became the first club since New Brighton in 1956-57 to feature in nine rounds of one FA Cup tournament. They progressed from the first qualifying round to the fifth round proper, defeating Shildon, Crook Town, Consett, Bishop Auckland, Burscough, Chesterfield, Enfield and Stoke City before Wrexham needed a replay at St James' Park in Newcastle to end their run.

== First round proper ==
The 48 teams from the Football League Third and Fourth Divisions entered in this round along with the 28 non-league clubs from the qualifying rounds and Workington, Scarborough, Dagenham and Wycombe Wanderers who were given byes. The first matches were played on 26 November 1977 with replays mainly taking place on 28–30 November. Three replays were postponed until 5-7 December.

| Tie no | Home team | Score | Away team | Date |
|---|---|---|---|---|
| 1 | Enfield | 3–0 | Wimbledon | 26 November 1977 |
| 2 | Chester | 4–1 | Darlington | 26 November 1977 |
| 3 | Chesterfield | 1–0 | Halifax Town | 26 November 1977 |
| 4 | Barnet | 1–2 | Peterborough United | 26 November 1977 |
| 5 | Bath City | 0–0 | Plymouth Argyle | 26 November 1977 |
| Replay | Plymouth Argyle | 2–0 | Bath City | 29 November 1977 |
| 6 | Preston North End | 3–2 | Lincoln City | 26 November 1977 |
| 7 | Watford | 2–0 | Hendon | 26 November 1977 |
| 8 | Reading | 3–1 | Aldershot | 26 November 1977 |
| 9 | Walsall | 1–0 | Dagenham | 26 November 1977 |
| 10 | Gillingham | 1–1 | Weymouth | 26 November 1977 |
| Replay | Weymouth | 0–1 | Gillingham | 30 November 1977 |
| 11 | Boreham Wood | 0–0 | Swindon Town | 26 November 1977 |
| Replay | Swindon Town | 2–0 | Boreham Wood | 29 November 1977 |
| 12 | Sheffield Wednesday | 1–0 | Bury | 26 November 1977 |
| 13 | Scarborough | 4–2 | Rochdale | 26 November 1977 |
| 14 | Doncaster Rovers | 0–1 | Shrewsbury Town | 26 November 1977 |
| 15 | Wrexham | 2–0 | Burton Albion | 26 November 1977 |
| 16 | Tranmere Rovers | 1–1 | Hartlepool United | 26 November 1977 |
| Replay | Hartlepool United | 3–1 | Tranmere Rovers | 29 November 1977 |
| 17 | Stockport County | 3–0 | Scunthorpe United | 26 November 1977 |
| 18 | Barnsley | 1–0 | Huddersfield Town | 26 November 1977 |
| 19 | Brentford | 2–0 | Folkestone & Shepway | 26 November 1977 |
| 20 | Lowestoft Town | 0–2 | Cambridge United | 26 November 1977 |
| 21 | Portsmouth | 3–1 | Bideford | 26 November 1977 |
| 22 | Bradford City | 0–1 | Crewe Alexandra | 26 November 1977 |
| 23 | Carlisle United | 2–0 | Stafford Rangers | 26 November 1977 |
| 24 | Spennymoor United | 3–1 | Goole Town | 26 November 1977 |
| 25 | Blyth Spartans | 1–0 | Burscough | 26 November 1977 |
| 26 | Minehead | 2–0 | Wycombe Wanderers | 26 November 1977 |
| 27 | Newport County | 1–1 | Exeter City | 26 November 1977 |
| Replay | Exeter City | 4–2 | Newport County | 30 November 1977 |
| 28 | Wealdstone | 0–0 | Hereford United | 26 November 1977 |
| Replay | Hereford United | 2–3 | Wealdstone | 30 November 1977 |
| 29 | Southport | 2–2 | Runcorn | 26 November 1977 |
| Replay | Runcorn | 1–0 | Southport | 28 November 1977 |
| 30 | Torquay United | 1–2 | Southend United | 26 November 1977 |
| 31 | Workington | 0–2 | Grimsby Town | 26 November 1977 |
| 32 | Rotherham United | 3–0 | Mossley | 26 November 1977 |
| 33 | Tilbury | 0–1 | Kettering Town | 26 November 1977 |
| Replay | Tilbury | 2–2 | Kettering Town | 5 December 1977 |
| Replay | Kettering Town | 2–3 | Tilbury | 7 December 1977 |
| 34 | Tooting & Mitcham United | 1–2 | Northampton Town | 26 November 1977 |
| 35 | Wigan Athletic | 1–0 | York City | 26 November 1977 |
| 36 | Colchester United | 1–1 | AFC Bournemouth | 26 November 1977 |
| Replay | AFC Bournemouth | 0–0 | Colchester United | 29 November 1977 |
| Replay | AFC Bournemouth | 1–4 | Colchester United | 5 December 1977 |
| 37 | Nuneaton Borough | 2–0 | Oxford United | 26 November 1977 |
| 38 | Leatherhead | 0–0 | Swansea City | 26 November 1977 |
| Replay | Swansea City | 2–1 | Leatherhead | 29 November 1977 |
| 39 | Arnold | 0–0 | Port Vale | 26 November 1977 |
| Replay | Port Vale | 5–2 | Arnold | 28 November 1977 |
| 40 | AP Leamington | 6–1 | Enderby Town | 26 November 1977 |

== Second round proper ==
The second round of games were played on 17 December 1977. Replays took place on 19–21 December.

| Tie no | Home team | Score | Away team | Date |
|---|---|---|---|---|
| 1 | Preston North End | 0–2 | Wrexham | 17 December 1977 |
| 2 | Watford | 2–0 | Colchester United | 17 December 1977 |
| 3 | Walsall | 1–1 | Port Vale | 17 December 1977 |
| Replay | Port Vale | 1–3 | Walsall | 19 December 1977 |
| 4 | Gillingham | 1–1 | Peterborough United | 17 December 1977 |
| Replay | Peterborough United | 2–0 | Gillingham | 20 December 1977 |
| 5 | Grimsby Town | 2–0 | Barnsley | 17 December 1977 |
| 6 | Crewe Alexandra | 0–0 | Scarborough | 17 December 1977 |
| Replay | Scarborough | 2–0 | Crewe Alexandra | 21 December 1977 |
| 7 | Swindon Town | 2–1 | Brentford | 17 December 1977 |
| 8 | Shrewsbury Town | 1–1 | Stockport County | 17 December 1977 |
| Replay | Stockport County | 1–2 | Shrewsbury Town | 19 December 1977 |
| 9 | Northampton Town | 0–2 | Enfield | 17 December 1977 |
| 10 | Portsmouth | 2–2 | Swansea City | 17 December 1977 |
| Replay | Swansea City | 2–1 | Portsmouth | 20 December 1977 |
| 11 | Plymouth Argyle | 1–0 | Cambridge United | 17 December 1977 |
| 12 | Carlisle United | 3–1 | Chester | 17 December 1977 |
| 13 | Blyth Spartans | 1–0 | Chesterfield | 17 December 1977 |
| 14 | Minehead | 0–3 | Exeter City | 17 December 1977 |
| 15 | Wealdstone | 2–1 | Reading | 17 December 1977 |
| 16 | Rotherham United | 6–0 | Spennymoor United | 17 December 1977 |
| 17 | Wigan Athletic | 1–0 | Sheffield Wednesday | 17 December 1977 |
| 18 | Nuneaton Borough | 1–2 | Tilbury | 17 December 1977 |
| 19 | AP Leamington | 0–0 | Southend United | 17 December 1977 |
| Replay | Southend United | 4–0 | AP Leamington | 19 December 1977 |
| 20 | Hartlepool United | 4–2 | Runcorn | 17 December 1977 |

== Third round proper ==
Teams from the Football League First and Second Divisions entered in this round. The third round of games in the FA Cup were played on 6–7 January 1978. Replays were mainly played over 9–11 January but some occurred on 16 January instead.

| Tie no | Home team | Score | Away team | Date |
|---|---|---|---|---|
| 1 | Bristol City | 4–4 | Wrexham | 7 January 1978 |
| Replay | Wrexham | 3–0 | Bristol City | 9 January 1978 |
| 2 | Burnley | 1–0 | Fulham | 7 January 1978 |
| 3 | Walsall | 4–1 | Swansea City | 7 January 1978 |
| 4 | Nottingham Forest | 4–1 | Swindon Town | 7 January 1978 |
| 5 | Blackburn Rovers | 2–1 | Shrewsbury Town | 7 January 1978 |
| 6 | Grimsby Town | 0–0 | Southampton | 7 January 1978 |
| Replay | Southampton | 0–0 | Grimsby Town | 10 January 1978 |
| Replay | Grimsby Town | 1–4 | Southampton | 16 January 1978 |
| 7 | Middlesbrough | 3–0 | Coventry City | 7 January 1978 |
| 8 | West Bromwich Albion | 4–1 | Blackpool | 7 January 1978 |
| 9 | Sunderland | 0–1 | Bristol Rovers | 7 January 1978 |
| 10 | Derby County | 3–2 | Southend United | 7 January 1978 |
| 11 | Luton Town | 1–1 | Oldham Athletic | 7 January 1978 |
| Replay | Oldham Athletic | 1–2 | Luton Town | 10 January 1978 |
| 12 | Everton | 4–1 | Aston Villa | 7 January 1978 |
| 13 | Sheffield United | 0–5 | Arsenal | 7 January 1978 |
| 14 | Tottenham Hotspur | 2–2 | Bolton Wanderers | 7 January 1978 |
| Replay | Bolton Wanderers | 2–1 | Tottenham Hotspur | 10 January 1978 |
| 15 | Queens Park Rangers | 4–0 | Wealdstone | 7 January 1978 |
| 16 | West Ham United | 1–0 | Watford | 7 January 1978 |
| 17 | Brighton & Hove Albion | 3–0 | Scarborough | 7 January 1978 |
| 18 | Hull City | 0–1 | Leicester City | 7 January 1978 |
| 19 | Carlisle United | 1–1 | Manchester United | 7 January 1978 |
| Replay | Manchester United | 4–2 | Carlisle United | 11 January 1978 |
| 20 | Chelsea | 4–2 | Liverpool | 7 January 1978 |
| 21 | Exeter City | 2–2 | Wolverhampton Wanderers | 7 January 1978 |
| Replay | Wolverhampton Wanderers | 3–1 | Exeter City | 10 January 1978 |
| 22 | Blyth Spartans | 1–0 | Enfield | 7 January 1978 |
| 23 | Mansfield Town | 1–0 | Plymouth Argyle | 7 January 1978 |
| 24 | Cardiff City | 0–2 | Ipswich Town | 7 January 1978 |
| 25 | Charlton Athletic | 0–2 | Notts County | 6 January 1978 |
| 26 | Leeds United | 1–2 | Manchester City | 7 January 1978 |
| 27 | Stoke City | 4–0 | Tilbury | 7 January 1978 |
| 28 | Rotherham United | 1–1 | Millwall | 7 January 1978 |
| Replay | Millwall | 2–0 | Rotherham United | 10 January 1978 |
| 29 | Peterborough United | 1–1 | Newcastle United | 7 January 1978 |
| Replay | Newcastle United | 2–0 | Peterborough United | 11 January 1978 |
| 30 | Birmingham City | 4–0 | Wigan Athletic | 7 January 1978 |
| 31 | Orient | 1–1 | Norwich City | 6 January 1978 |
| Replay | Norwich City | 0–1 | Orient | 16 January 1978 |
| 32 | Hartlepool United | 2–1 | Crystal Palace | 7 January 1978 |

== Fourth round proper ==
The fourth round of games were intended to be played on 28 January 1978, but by this time only nine matches had been played, of which three went to replays. The other matches and replays were completed either midweek on 31 January – 1 February, or on 6 February. Replays were played at various times after the initial games. Holders Manchester United were eliminated by West Bromwich Albion.

| Tie no | Home team | Score | Away team | Date |
|---|---|---|---|---|
| 1 | Walsall | 1–0 | Leicester City | 28 January 1978 |
| 2 | Nottingham Forest | 2–1 | Manchester City | 31 January 1978 |
| 3 | Bolton Wanderers | 1–0 | Mansfield Town | 6 February 1978 |
| 4 | Middlesbrough | 3–2 | Everton | 28 January 1978 |
| 5 | Derby County | 2–1 | Birmingham City | 1 February 1978 |
| 6 | Ipswich Town | 4–1 | Hartlepool United | 28 January 1978 |
| 7 | Newcastle United | 2–2 | Wrexham | 28 January 1978 |
| Replay | Wrexham | 4–1 | Newcastle United | 6 February 1978 |
| 8 | Bristol Rovers | 2–0 | Southampton | 28 January 1978 |
| 9 | West Ham United | 1–1 | Queens Park Rangers | 28 January 1978 |
| Replay | Queens Park Rangers | 6–1 | West Ham United | 31 January 1978 |
| 10 | Brighton & Hove Albion | 1–2 | Notts County | 31 January 1978 |
| 11 | Manchester United | 1–1 | West Bromwich Albion | 28 January 1978 |
| Replay | West Bromwich Albion | 3–2 | Manchester United | 1 February 1978 |
| 12 | Millwall | 4–0 | Luton Town | 31 January 1978 |
| 13 | Chelsea | 6–2 | Burnley | 31 January 1978 |
| 14 | Arsenal | 2–1 | Wolverhampton Wanderers | 28 January 1978 |
| 15 | Stoke City | 2–3 | Blyth Spartans | 6 February 1978 |
| 16 | Orient | 3–1 | Blackburn Rovers | 28 January 1978 |

== Fifth round proper ==
The fifth set of games mainly took place on 18 February 1978, with two of the games played on 22nd and 27th. Four games went to replays which were played on 27–28 February. A second replay was then played on 2 March.

Blyth Spartans was the first non-League club to reach the Fifth Round since Yeovil Town in 1948-49. They were the last club from the qualifying rounds left in the competition.

| Tie no | Home team | Score | Away team | Date |
|---|---|---|---|---|
| 1 | Middlesbrough | 2–0 | Bolton Wanderers | 27 February 1978 |
| 2 | Derby County | 2–3 | West Bromwich Albion | 22 February 1978 |
| 3 | Wrexham | 1–1 | Blyth Spartans | 18 February 1978 |
| Replay | Blyth Spartans | 1–2 | Wrexham | 27 February 1978 |
| 4 | Queens Park Rangers | 1–1 | Nottingham Forest | 18 February 1978 |
| Replay | Nottingham Forest | 1–1 | Queens Park Rangers | 27 February 1978 |
| Replay | Nottingham Forest | 3–1 | Queens Park Rangers | 2 March 1978 |
| 5 | Bristol Rovers | 2–2 | Ipswich Town | 18 February 1978 |
| Replay | Ipswich Town | 3–0 | Bristol Rovers | 28 February 1978 |
| 6 | Millwall | 2–1 | Notts County | 18 February 1978 |
| 7 | Arsenal | 4–1 | Walsall | 18 February 1978 |
| 8 | Orient | 0–0 | Chelsea | 18 February 1978 |
| Replay | Chelsea | 1–2 | Orient | 27 February 1978 |

== Sixth round proper ==
The sixth round of FA Cup games were played on 11 March 1978. There was one replay on 14th.

| Tie no | Home team | Score | Away team | Date |
|---|---|---|---|---|
| 1 | Middlesbrough | 0–0 | Orient | 11 March 1978 |
| Replay | Orient | 2–1 | Middlesbrough | 14 March 1978 |
| 2 | West Bromwich Albion | 2–0 | Nottingham Forest | 11 March 1978 |
| 3 | Wrexham | 2–3 | Arsenal | 11 March 1978 |
| 4 | Millwall | 1–6 | Ipswich Town | 11 March 1978 |

== Semi-finals ==
8 April 1978

| Ipswich Town | 3–1 | West Bromwich Albion |
|---|---|---|
| Talbot 8'; Mills 20'; Wark 90' | Report | T. Brown pen 80' |

Highbury, London
Attendance: 51,000
Referee: Clive Thomas, Treorchy

8 April 1978

| Arsenal | 3–0 | Orient |
|---|---|---|
| Macdonald 16' 20'; Rix 65' | Report |

Stamford Bridge, London
Referee: Pat Partridge, County Durham

== Final ==
6 May 1978
15:00 BST

| Arsenal | 0–1 | Ipswich Town |
|---|---|---|
| | | Osborne 77' |

Wembley, London
Attendance: 100,000
Referee: Derek Nippard (Christchurch)

| Arsenal | Ipswich |

== TV coverage ==
The right to show FA Cup games were, as with Football League matches, shared between the BBC and ITV network. All games were shown in a highlights format, except the Final, which was shown live both on BBC1 and ITV. The BBC football highlights programme Match of the Day would show up to three games and the various ITV regional network stations would cover up to one game and show highlights from other games covered elsewhere on the ITV network. No games from Rounds 1 or 2 were shown. Highlights of replays were shown on either the BBC or ITV. The BBC were only able to cover two planned Round Three FA Cup round ties due to a technical error for West Ham United v Watford.

Third Round BBC Carlisle United v Manchester United, Leeds United v Manchester City, Manchester United v Carlisle United (Midweek replay). ITV Chelsea v Liverpool (LWT), Sheffield United v Arsenal (Yorkshire), Everton v Aston Villa (Granada & ATV), Middlesbrough v Coventry City (Tyne-Tees), Peterborough United v Newcastle United (Anglia)

Fourth Round BBC Manchester United v West Bromwich Albion, Newcastle United v Wrexham, Arsenal v Wolverhampton Wanderers. ITV Middlesbrough v Everton (Tyne-Tees & Granada), West Ham United v Queens Park Rangers (LWT), Walsall v Leicester City (ATV), Bristol Rovers v Southampton (HTV & Southern), Nottingham Forest v Manchester City (Midweek All Regions)

Fifth Round BBC Wrexham v Blyth Spartans, Queens Park Rangers v Nottingham Forest, Arsenal v Walsall. ITV Bristol Rovers v Ipswich Town (HTV & Anglia), Orient v Chelsea (LWT) All regions showed these two games.

Sixth Round BBC West Bromwich Albion v Nottingham Forest, Millwall v Ipswich Town. ITV Wrexham v Arsenal (HTV, Granada & LWT), Middlesbrough v Orient (Tyne-Tees & Yorkshire) All regions showed these two games

Semi-Finals BBC Ipswich Town v West Bromwich Albion. ITV Arsenal v Orient (All regions)

Final Arsenal v Ipswich Town shown live on BBC and ITV.

== See also ==
- 1977–78 WFA Cup
