= Kevin O'Callaghan =

Footballer (born 1961)

Personal information
- Date of birth: 19 October 1961 (age 65)
- Place of birth: Dagenham, England
- Height: 5 ft 8 in (1.73 m)
- Position: Left winger

Youth career
- 1977–1979: Millwall

Senior career*
Years	Team	Apps	(Gls)
1978–1980	Millwall	23	(6)
1980–1985	Ipswich Town	115	(3)
1985–1987	Portsmouth	80	(16)
1987–1991	Millwall	89	(14)
1991–1993	Southend United	24	(1)
Total		331	(40)

International career
- Republic of Ireland U21
1981–1987	Republic of Ireland	21	(1)
- * Club domestic league appearances and goals

Kevin O'Callaghan (born 19 October 1961) is a former professional footballer, who played as a left winger. Born in England, he made 21 appearances for the Republic of Ireland national team scoring once.

== Early years ==
O'Callaghan was born in Havering on the 19 October 1961 to Paddy and Barbara O'Callaghan.

== Playing career ==
O'Callaghan enjoyed two spells at Millwall as well as stints at Portsmouth and Southend. His most successful years came after transferring to Ipswich Town for a record breaking £250,000 in 1980, joining Bobby Robson's revolution at the club. O'Callaghan contributed to Ipswich's victorious 1980-81 UEFA Cup campaign, making five appearances during the run. However he was not part of the squad for the final itself. He also earned a call up to the Irish national team, who he represented on 21 occasions, scoring one goal.

He was in the Portsmouth team that won promotion to the First Division in 1987 after nearly 30 years away, and then signed for Millwall, helping them reach the First Division in 1988 for the first time in their history. They stayed there for two years, and he stayed with them for a season after relegation.

A knee injury brought his career to an abrupt end in 1993.

== Coaching career ==
Following his playing career, Kevin transitioned into coaching, serving at Millwall where he worked with a number of young players, including Tim Cahill.

== Other ventures ==
O'Callaghan appeared in the 1981 movie Escape to Victory (misspelled O’Calloghan in the credits), cast in the unfamiliar role of goalkeeper alongside Michael Caine, Sylvester Stallone and Pelé.

Year	Title	Role	Notes
1981	Escape to Victory	Tony Lewis - Allied Goalkeeper - The Players: Ireland	

== Family life ==
O'Callaghan currently lives in Kent with his wife and two daughters.

== Honours ==
Millwall

Winner

- 1978/79 FA Youth Cup
- 1987–88 Football League Second Division

Ipswich Town

Winner

- 1980–81 UEFA Cup

Runner up

- 1980–81 Football League First Division (Level 1)
- 1981–82 Football League First Division (Level 1)

Portsmouth

Winner

- 1986–87 Football League Second Division

== See also ==
- List of Republic of Ireland international footballers born outside the Republic of Ireland
