= East Anglian derby =

Rivalry between Norwich City FC and Ipswich Town FC

- Other names: Old Farm derby
- Location: East Anglia
- Teams: Norwich City; Ipswich Town
- First meeting: 15 November 1902; Norwich 1–0 Ipswich
- Latest meeting: 11 April 2026; EFL Championship; Norwich 0–2 Ipswich
- Stadiums: Carrow Road; Portman Road

Statistics
- Total meetings: 122 (competitive); 155 (overall)
- Most wins: Norwich City (48)
- Top scorer: John Wark (9)
- All-time series: Ipswich Town: 47; Draw: 27; Norwich City: 48
- Largest victory: Ipswich Town 1–6 Norwich City (26 March 1904); Ipswich Town 5–0 Norwich City (7 September 1946); Ipswich Town 5–0 Norwich City (15 February 1977); Ipswich Town 5–0 Norwich City (21 February 1998)
- Longest unbeaten streak: 14 games Norwich City (2009–2025)
- Current unbeaten streak: 2 games Ipswich Town (2025–present)

The East Anglian derby is a term used to describe football matches held between Norwich City and Ipswich Town, the only Football League clubs in the neighbouring East Anglian counties of Norfolk and Suffolk respectively. In recent years it has sometimes been humorously called the Old Farm derby, a reference to the Old Firm derby played between rival Glasgow clubs Celtic and Rangers, and to the prominence of agriculture in East Anglia. The derby has been described as one of the best derbies in the UK.

Including friendly meetings, there have been 155 instances of the derby overall, with Ipswich winning 62 times and Norwich winning 60. In competitive meetings, the balance tips towards Norwich, having won 48 to Ipswich's 47. The series began in the early 20th century, when both clubs were amateur organisations, with the first derby between the two professional clubs taking place in 1939. The most recent derby was played on 11 April 2026 at Carrow Road, which ended in a 2-0 win for Ipswich. This was the third time in over 16 years that Ipswich won the derby, winning the meeting previously in the season 3-1 at Portman Road. This is the first time Ipswich have done the double in a season for 33 years. Winning the derby is one measure used to determine which club from the region can declare itself the "Pride of Anglia".

== Style and atmosphere ==
According to the Football Rivalries Report 2008, the East Anglian derby is the second-fiercest rivalry in England, after the Black Country derby between West Bromwich Albion and Wolverhampton Wanderers. The report stated, "The gap of 40 miles doesn't make those East Anglia 'Old Farm' derbies any less intense, and this, combined with the regularity and closeness of the games, and the recent fortunes of both clubs, put it ahead of all but one rivalry in League football."

Former referee Keith Hackett said of the East Anglian derby:

"As for the most aggressive atmosphere that I've ever encountered, believe it or not it was at Carrow Road for Norwich v Ipswich Town. There are certain derby fixtures that you always know are going to be highly charged, but the East Anglian derby tops the lot. The players came out of the tunnel as if they were ready for a boxing match. The noise was intense and aggressive."

Rob Hadgraft, who wrote The Old Farm, suggested some reasons for the intensity of the rivalry: "I think it's because each club represents the entire county ... There's only one club in Norfolk, and the same goes for Suffolk ... The people live up to 40 miles apart, so they don't mingle and have pals who support the other lot ... you've got two sets of fans who never really mingle or mix, and there's no proper friendships. They really do despise each other."

The rivalry extends to the daily life of fans, for example, many Ipswich fans refuse to ever eat Colman’s of Norwich mustard.

== History ==
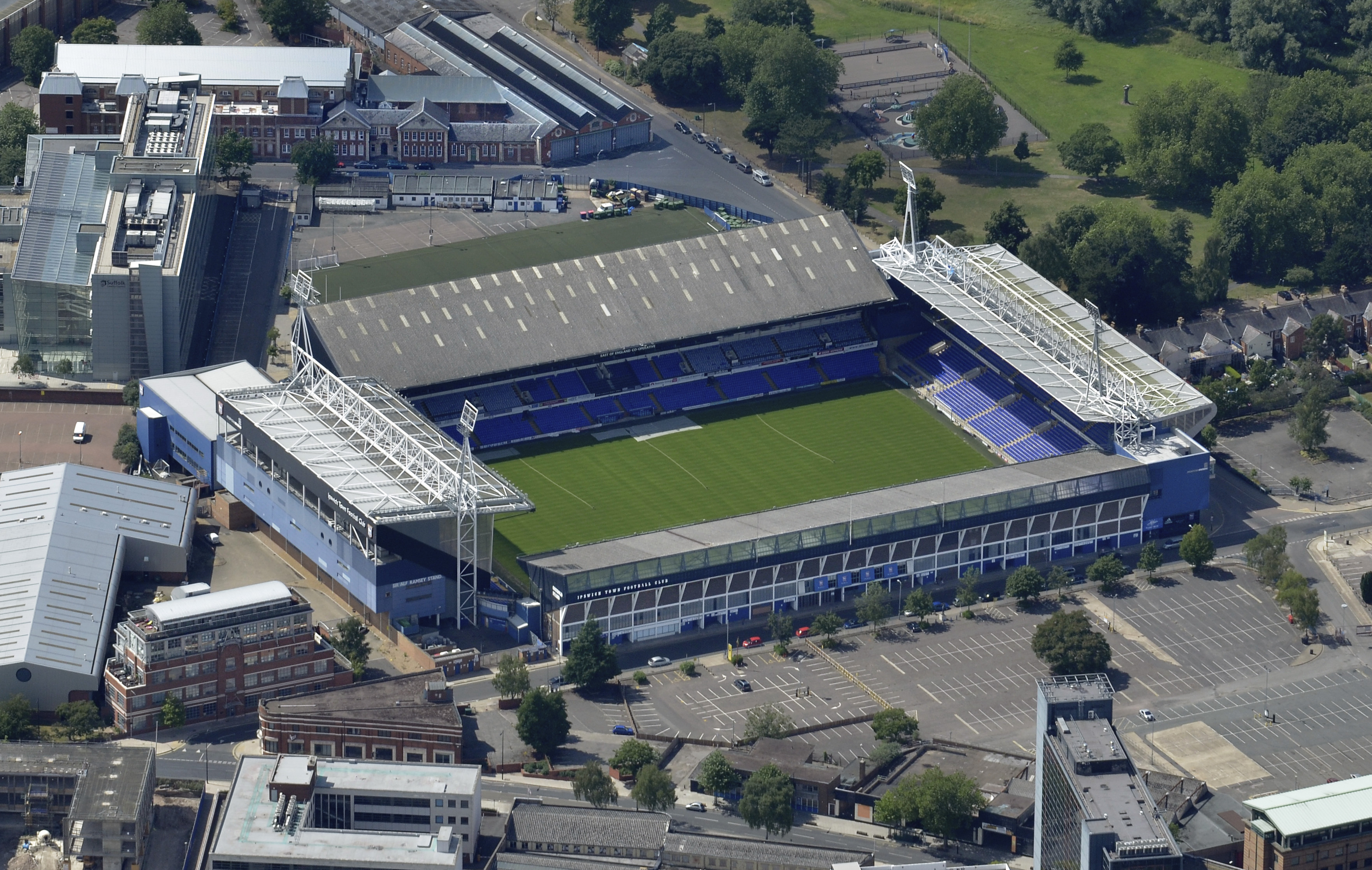
Portman Road

The first derby was held between the two clubs on 15 November 1902, when both teams were still playing at an amateur level. The Norfolk & Suffolk League fixture was played in Norwich and finished 1–0 to Norwich City. Norwich turned professional in 1905 with Ipswich following in 1936. Ipswich Town was elected to the Football League in 1938, and the first fully professional league game between the two clubs took place on 2 September 1939 in the Third Division South. Played at Portman Road, the match finished 1–1, although the league was abandoned a few days later following the outbreak of the Second World War.

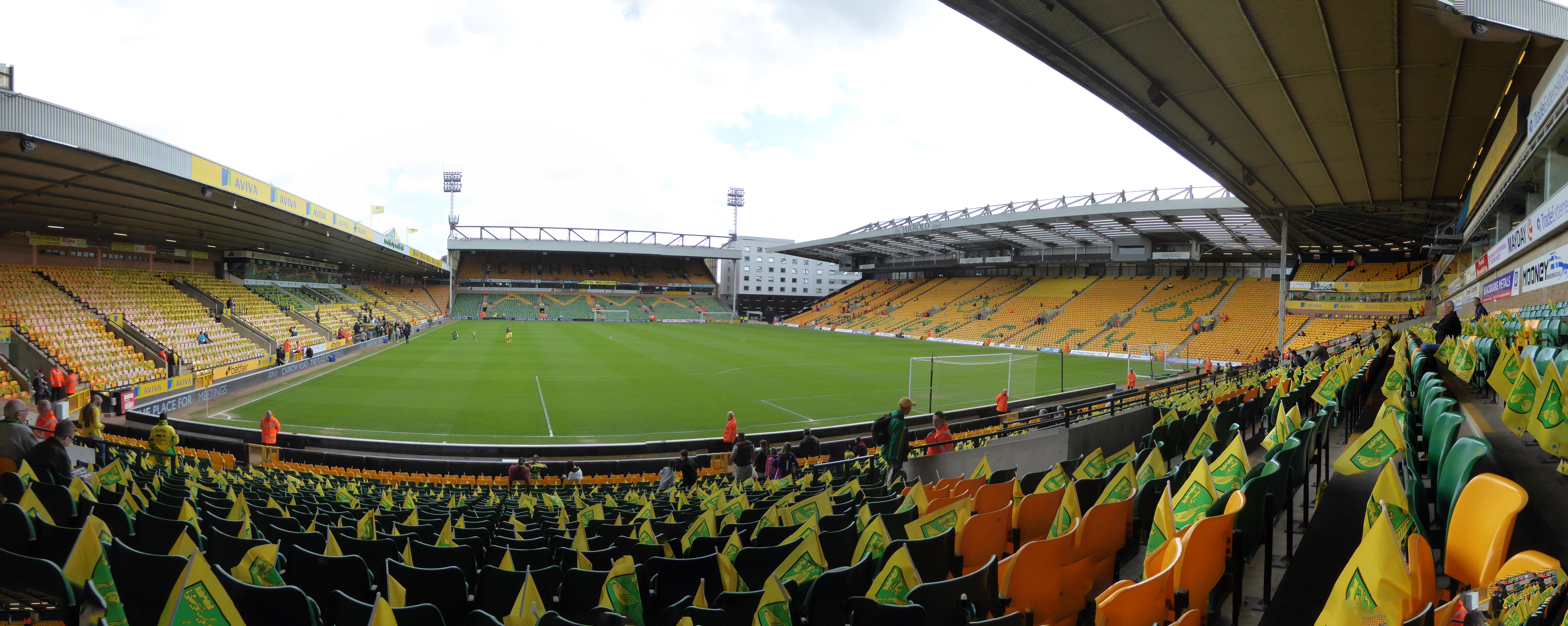
Carrow Road

As the clubs have tended to play in the same division over the years, the derby has been contested in most seasons since this time, the longest gap being for a period of six seasons between 1986–87 and 1991–92 inclusive. The longest gap since then has been four seasons; following Norwich's promotion to the Premier League and Ipswich's relegation to League One at the end of the 2018–19 season the two teams were at least a division apart until Ipswich's promotion to the Championship at the end of the 2022–23 season.

Two of the more notable meetings between the two clubs have come in cup competitions. In the 1972–73 season Ipswich beat Norwich 4–2 on aggregate to win the two-legged Texaco Cup, with 2–1 wins in both legs. In 1985 the clubs met in the semi-final of the League Cup, with a place in the Wembley final at stake. Ipswich won the first leg 1–0 at Portman Road, but Norwich scored early in the return leg at Carrow Road to level the tie. With extra time looming, Steve Bruce scored a late winner to send Norwich to Wembley.

In the 2014–15 season there were four East Anglian derbies, because the teams met in a two legged Championship play-off semi-final in addition to the regular two league games played during the season. The first match of the season was held at Portman Road on 23 August; it finished with Norwich winning 1–0. The reverse fixture at Carrow Road was on 1 March and Norwich again won, this time 2–0. The two play-off ties were held on 9 and 16 May, the first at Ipswich. The first leg finished 1–1, and the second leg finished with Norwich taking their third derby victory of the season by winning 3–1 and therefore booking their place in the play-off final at Wembley.

== Derby overview ==
As of 11 April 2026

Chart of yearly table positions of Ipswich and Norwich in the league.

Head-to-head record
Competition	Matches	Ipswich wins	Draws	Norwich wins
League	103	41	23	39
Cup	17	6	3	8
Play-offs	2	0	1	1
Total	122	47	27	48

== All time series ==
=== Competitive matches ===
League games
No.	Date	Home team	Score	Away team	League
1.	15 November 1902	Norwich City	0–0	Ipswich Town	Norfolk & Suffolk League
2.	13 December 1902	Ipswich Town	1–2	Norwich City	Norfolk & Suffolk League
3.	26 March 1904	Ipswich Town	1–6	Norwich City	Norfolk & Suffolk League
4.	5 April 1904	Norwich City	1–1	Ipswich Town	Norfolk & Suffolk League
5.	14 January 1905	Norwich City	2–0	Ipswich Town	Norfolk & Suffolk League
6.	29 April 1905	Ipswich Town	1–0	Norwich City	Norfolk & Suffolk League
7.	2 September 1939	Ipswich Town	1–1	Norwich City	Division 3 (South)
8.	1 December 1945	Norwich City	4–0	Ipswich Town	Division 3 South (North)
9.	19 December 1945	Ipswich Town	0–0	Norwich City	Division 3 South (North)
10.	7 September 1946	Ipswich Town	5–0	Norwich City	Division 3 (South)
11.	4 January 1947	Norwich City	0–1	Ipswich Town	Division 3 (South)
12.	13 September 1947	Norwich City	1–5	Ipswich Town	Division 3 (South)
13.	31 January 1948	Ipswich Town	1–2	Norwich City	Division 3 (South)
14.	16 October 1948	Ipswich Town	1–2	Norwich City	Division 3 (South)
15.	12 March 1949	Norwich City	2–0	Ipswich Town	Division 3 (South)
16.	15 October 1949	Ipswich Town	3–0	Norwich City	Division 3 (South)
17.	4 March 1950	Norwich City	1–1	Ipswich Town	Division 3 (South)
18.	11 April 1951	Ipswich Town	0–1	Norwich City	Division 3 (South)
19.	28 April 1951	Norwich City	1–3	Ipswich Town	Division 3 (South)
20.	25 December 1951	Ipswich Town	0–2	Norwich City	Division 3 (South)
21.	26 December 1951	Norwich City	2–0	Ipswich Town	Division 3 (South)
22.	28 August 1952	Ipswich Town	2–1	Norwich City	Division 3 (South)
23.	3 September 1952	Norwich City	1–0	Ipswich Town	Division 3 (South)
24.	28 November 1953	Ipswich Town	1–1	Norwich City	Division 3 (South)
25.	20 March 1954	Norwich City	1–2	Ipswich Town	Division 3 (South)
26.	30 March 1956	Ipswich Town	4–1	Norwich City	Division 3 (South)
27.	2 April 1956	Norwich City	3–2	Ipswich Town	Division 3 (South)
28.	19 April 1957	Norwich City	1–2	Ipswich Town	Division 3 (South)
29.	22 April 1957	Ipswich Town	3–1	Norwich City	Division 3 (South)
30.	26 December 1960	Norwich City	0–3	Ipswich Town	Division 2
31.	27 December 1960	Ipswich Town	4–1	Norwich City	Division 2
32.	5 September 1964	Norwich City	2–1	Ipswich Town	Division 2
33.	2 January 1965	Ipswich Town	3–0	Norwich City	Division 2
34.	25 September 1965	Norwich City	1–0	Ipswich Town	Division 2
35.	19 March 1966	Ipswich Town	2–0	Norwich City	Division 2
36.	3 September 1966	Norwich City	1–2	Ipswich Town	Division 2
37.	18 April 1967	Ipswich Town	0–2	Norwich City	Division 2
38.	23 September 1967	Norwich City	0–0	Ipswich Town	Division 2
39.	3 February 1968	Ipswich Town	4–3	Norwich City	Division 2
40.	15 August 1972	Ipswich Town	1–2	Norwich City	Division 1
41.	11 November 1972	Norwich City	0–0	Ipswich Town	Division 1
42.	26 December 1973	Norwich City	1–2	Ipswich Town	Division 1
43.	2 March 1974	Ipswich Town	1–1	Norwich City	Division 1
44.	23 September 1975	Ipswich Town	2–0	Norwich City	Division 1
45.	31 March 1976	Norwich City	1–0	Ipswich Town	Division 1
46.	5 February 1977	Ipswich Town	5–0	Norwich City	Division 1
47.	9 April 1977	Norwich City	0–1	Ipswich Town	Division 1
48.	26 December 1977	Norwich City	1–0	Ipswich Town	Division 1
49.	23 March 1978	Ipswich Town	4–0	Norwich City	Division 1
50.	26 December 1978	Ipswich Town	1–1	Norwich City	Division 1
51.	14 April 1979	Norwich City	0–1	Ipswich Town	Division 1
52.	26 December 1979	Norwich City	3–3	Ipswich Town	Division 1
53.	5 April 1980	Ipswich Town	4–2	Norwich City	Division 1
54.	26 December 1980	Ipswich Town	2–0	Norwich City	Division 1
55.	20 April 1981	Norwich City	1–0	Ipswich Town	Division 1
56.	27 December 1982	Ipswich Town	2–3	Norwich City	Division 1
57.	4 April 1983	Norwich City	0–0	Ipswich Town	Division 1
58.	27 December 1983	Norwich City	0–0	Ipswich Town	Division 1
59.	23 April 1984	Ipswich Town	2–0	Norwich City	Division 1
60.	1 January 1985	Ipswich Town	2–0	Norwich City	Division 1
61.	8 April 1985	Norwich City	0–2	Ipswich Town	Division 1
62.	21 December 1992	Norwich City	0–2	Ipswich Town	Premier League
63.	19 April 1993	Ipswich Town	3–1	Norwich City	Premier League
64.	25 August 1993	Norwich City	1–0	Ipswich Town	Premier League
65.	18 December 1993	Ipswich Town	2–1	Norwich City	Premier League
66.	19 September 1994	Ipswich Town	1–2	Norwich City	Premier League
67.	20 March 1995	Norwich City	3–0	Ipswich Town	Premier League
68.	19 November 1995	Norwich City	2–1	Ipswich Town	Division 1
69.	14 April 1996	Ipswich Town	2–1	Norwich City	Division 1
70.	11 October 1996	Norwich City	3–1	Ipswich Town	Division 1
71.	18 April 1997	Ipswich Town	2–0	Norwich City	Division 1
72.	26 September 1997	Norwich City	2–1	Ipswich Town	Division 1
73.	21 February 1998	Ipswich Town	5–0	Norwich City	Division 1
74.	20 October 1998	Ipswich Town	0–1	Norwich City	Division 1
75.	11 April 1999	Norwich City	0–0	Ipswich Town	Division 1
76.	21 November 1999	Norwich City	0–0	Ipswich Town	Division 1
77.	19 March 2000	Ipswich Town	0–2	Norwich City	Division 1
78.	15 September 2002	Ipswich Town	1–1	Norwich City	Division One
79.	2 March 2003	Norwich City	0–2	Ipswich Town	Division One
80.	21 December 2003	Ipswich Town	0–2	Norwich City	Division One
81.	7 March 2004	Norwich City	3–1	Ipswich Town	Division One
82.	18 September 2005	Ipswich Town	0–1	Norwich City	Championship
83.	5 February 2006	Norwich City	1–2	Ipswich Town	Championship
84.	19 November 2006	Ipswich Town	3–1	Norwich City	Championship
85.	22 April 2007	Norwich City	1–1	Ipswich Town	Championship
86.	4 November 2007	Norwich City	2–2	Ipswich Town	Championship
87.	13 April 2008	Ipswich Town	2–1	Norwich City	Championship
88.	7 December 2008	Norwich City	2–0	Ipswich Town	Championship
89.	19 April 2009	Ipswich Town	3–2	Norwich City	Championship
90.	28 November 2010	Norwich City	4–1	Ipswich Town	Championship
91.	21 April 2011	Ipswich Town	1–5	Norwich City	Championship
92.	23 August 2014	Ipswich Town	0–1	Norwich City	Championship
93.	1 March 2015	Norwich City	2–0	Ipswich Town	Championship
94.	21 August 2016	Ipswich Town	1–1	Norwich City	Championship
95.	26 February 2017	Norwich City	1–1	Ipswich Town	Championship
96.	22 October 2017	Ipswich Town	0–1	Norwich City	Championship
97.	18 February 2018	Norwich City	1–1	Ipswich Town	Championship
98.	2 September 2018	Ipswich Town	1–1	Norwich City	Championship
99.	10 February 2019	Norwich City	3–0	Ipswich Town	Championship
100.	16 December 2023	Ipswich Town	2–2	Norwich City	Championship
101.	6 April 2024	Norwich City	1–0	Ipswich Town	Championship
102.	5 October 2025	Ipswich Town	3–1	Norwich City	Championship
103.	11 April 2026	Norwich City	0–2	Ipswich Town	Championship
Cup games & play-offs
No.	Date	Home team	Score	Away team	Competition
1.	9 February 1946	Norwich City	1–0	Ipswich Town	Division 3 South (North) Cup
2.	16 February 1946	Ipswich Town	4–0	Norwich City	Division 3 South (North) Cup
3.	22 January 1962	Norwich City	1–1	Ipswich Town	FA Cup 4th Round
4.	30 January 1962	Ipswich Town	1–2	Norwich City	FA Cup 4th Round (Replay)
5.	3 September 1968	Ipswich Town	2–4	Norwich City	League Cup 2nd Round
6.	4 May 1973	Ipswich Town	2–1	Norwich City	Texaco Cup Final 1st Leg
7.	7 May 1973	Norwich City	1–2	Ipswich Town	Texaco Cup Final 2nd Leg
8.	4 September 1974	Norwich City	1–1	Ipswich Town	League Cup 5th Round
9.	10 September 1974	Ipswich Town	1–2	Norwich City	League Cup 5th Round (Replay)
10.	23 September 1980	Ipswich Town	1–1	Norwich City	League Cup 3rd Round
11.	8 October 1980	Norwich City	1–3	Ipswich Town	League Cup 3rd Round (Replay)
12.	19 February 1983	Norwich City	1–0	Ipswich Town	FA Cup 5th Round
13.	30 November 1983	Ipswich Town	0–1	Norwich City	League Cup 4th Round
14.	23 February 1985	Ipswich Town	1–0	Norwich City	League Cup Semi-Final 1st Leg
15.	6 March 1985	Norwich City	2–0	Ipswich Town	League Cup Semi-Final 2nd Leg
16.	20 December 1988	Ipswich Town	1–0	Norwich City	Full Members Cup 2nd Round
17.	27 February 1991	Norwich City	2–0	Ipswich Town	Full Members Cup Semi-Final
18.	9 May 2015	Ipswich Town	1–1	Norwich City	Championship Play-Off Semi-Final 1st Leg
19.	16 May 2015	Norwich City	3–1	Ipswich Town	Championship Play-Off Semi-Final 2nd Leg

=== Other matches (non-competitive) ===
Friendlies, charity matches, and testimonials
No.	Date	Home team	Score	Away team	Competition
1.	1 November 1905	Ipswich Town	0–5	Norwich City	Friendly
2.	4 April 1937	Ipswich Town	3–2	Norwich City	Ipswich Hospital Cup
3.	28 April 1937	Norwich City	3–1	Ipswich Town	Testimonial for Bernard Robinson & Jack Scott
4.	20 August 1938	Norwich City	1–1	Ipswich Town	Football League Jubilee Fund
5.	19 August 1939	Ipswich Town	2–1	Norwich City	Football League Jubilee Fund
6.	27 April 1946	Norwich City	1–2	Ipswich Town	Norfolk Jubilee Cup 1st Leg
7.	4 May 1946	Ipswich Town	3–2	Norwich City	Norfolk Jubilee Cup 2nd Leg
8.	25 May 1947	Norwich City	2–1	Ipswich Town	Norfolk Jubilee Cup
9.	5 May 1948	Norwich City	2–1	Ipswich Town	Norfolk Jubilee Cup
10.	14 May 1949	Norwich City	1–0	Ipswich Town	Norfolk Jubilee Cup
11.	10 May 1950	Ipswich Town	2–1	Norwich City	Norfolk Jubilee Cup
12.	19 March 1958	Norwich City	2–2	Ipswich Town	Friendly
13.	28 April 1958	Ipswich Town	2–1	Norwich City	Testimonial for Adam Scott Duncan
14.	4 May 1959	Norwich City	2–4	Ipswich Town	Norfolk Charities Cup
15.	4 May 1960	Ipswich Town	1–0	Norwich City	Ipswich Hospital Cup
16.	15 February 1964	Ipswich Town	2–1	Norwich City	Friendly
17.	22 April 1964	Norwich City	0–0	Ipswich Town	Testimonial for Ron Ashman
18.	25 May 1966	Norwich City	3–1	Ipswich Town	Testimonial in honour of Barry Butler
19.	30 April 1969	Norwich City	3–1	Ipswich Town	Testimonial for Terry Allcock
20.	4 August 1971	Norwich City	4–3	Ipswich Town	Friendly
21.	3 May 1974	Norwich City	1–3	Ipswich Town	Testimonial for Kevin Keelan
22.	9 May 1977	Ipswich Town	2–1	Norwich City	Testimonial for Colin Viljoen
23.	8 August 1978	Ipswich Town	2–1	Norwich City	Willhire Cup
24.	5 February 1979	Ipswich Town	2–1	Norwich City	Testimonial for Trevor Whymark
25.	14 August 1979	Norwich City	2–0	Ipswich Town	Willhire Cup
26.	12 August 1980	Ipswich Town	2–2	Norwich City	Willhire Cup
27.	22 December 1981	Ipswich Town	1–5	Norwich City	Friendly (neutral venue; Great Yarmouth)
28.	26 March 1986	Ipswich Town	0–1	Norwich City	Testimonial for Paul Cooper
29.	2 February 1988	Ipswich Town	2–2	Norwich City	Friendly (behind closed doors)
30.	19 August 1988	Ipswich Town	3–1	Norwich City	Ipswich Hospital Cup
31.	12 August 1989	Norwich City	0–4	Ipswich Town	Norwich Hospital Cup
32.	17 August 1990	Ipswich Town	1–1	Norwich City	Ipswich Hospital Cup
33.	10 August 1991	Norwich City	3–0	Ipswich Town	Norwich Hospital Cup

== Statistics ==
The derby has been contested 122 times in competitive games, 62 of which have been played at Ipswich and 60 at Norwich. In these, Norwich have won 48 times and Ipswich 47, with 27 matches ending as draws. The clubs have also played each other in friendlies and testimonial matches. In total, including friendly matches, the derby has been contested 155 times, with Ipswich having 62 victories to Norwich's 60, with 33 matches finishing as draws. The highest attendance in the derby at Portman Road is 35,077 for a First Division match in September 1975, while Carrow Road hosted 39,890 spectators for an FA Cup match in January 1962. John Wark is Ipswich's leading goalscorer in the derby with nine goals, while Hugh Curran remains Norwich's top scorer with five, a record that has stood since 1968.

The most goals scored by a team in a derby match is six, with Norwich scoring six goals in a match during the 1903–04 season. Five goals have been scored by one team on five occasions – Ipswich in 1946–47, 1947–48, 1976–77 and 1997–98, and Norwich in 2010–11. The highest aggregate score in a match is seven goals, Norwich winning 6–1 away at Ipswich in the Norfolk and Suffolk league in 1903–04, and Ipswich winning 4–3 in a Second Division match at Carrow Road in 1968–69. At least six players have scored hat-tricks in derby matches – Hugh Curran in 1968–69 and Grant Holt in 2010–11 for Norwich, and Albert Day in 1946–47, Colin Viljoen in 1967–68, Trevor Whymark in 1976–77, and Alex Mathie in 1997–98 for Ipswich.

Competition breakdown of stats for competitive matches
League
Competition		Matches	Ipswich wins	Draws	Norwich wins
Tier	League	Matches	Ipswich wins	Draws	Norwich wins
I	Division 1	22	11	6	5
I	Premier League	6	3	0	3
I	Total	28	14	6	8
II	Division 2	10	6	1	3
II	Division 1	10	3	2	5
II	Division One	4	1	1	2
II	Championship	22	6	7	9
II	Total	46	16	11	19
III	Division 3 (South)	21	10	3	8
III	Division 3 South (North)	2	0	1	1
III	Total	23	10	4	9
–	Norfolk & Suffolk League	6	1	2	3
League total		103	41	23	39
Cup
Competition		Matches	Ipswich wins	Draws	Norwich wins
FA Cup		3	0	1	2
League Cup		8	2	2	4
Texaco Cup		2	2	0	0
Full Members Cup		2	1	0	1
Division 3 South (North) Cup		2	1	0	1
Cup total		17	6	3	8
Play-offs
Competition		Matches	Ipswich wins	Draws	Norwich wins
Championship play-offs		2	0	1	1
Play-offs total		2	0	1	1
Competitive games total		122	47	27	48
Breakdown of non-competitive matches
Competition		Matches	Ipswich wins	Draws	Norwich wins
Ipswich Hospital Cup		4	3	1	0
Norwich Hospital Cup		2	1	0	1
Norfolk Charities Cup		1	1	0	0
Norfolk Jubilee Cup		6	3	0	3
Football League Jubilee Fund		2	1	1	0
Willhire Cup		3	1	1	1
Friendlies		6	1	2	3
Testimonials		9	4	1	4
Non-competitive games total		33	15	6	12
All games total		155	62	33	60

== See also ==
- Pride of Anglia
