= Escape to Victory =

1981 film

- Theatrical release poster
- Directed by: John Huston
- Screenplay by: Evan Jones; Yabo Yablonsky
- Story by: Yabo Yablonsky; Djordje Milićević; Jeff Maguire
- Based on: Two Half Times in Hell by Zoltán Fábri
- Produced by: Freddie Fields
- Starring: Sylvester Stallone; Michael Caine; Max von Sydow; Pelé
- Cinematography: Gerry Fisher
- Edited by: Roberto Silvi
- Music by: Bill Conti
- Production companies: Lorimar; Victory Company; New Gold Entertainment
- Distributed by: Paramount Pictures
- Release date: July 30, 1981 (United States)
- Running time: 117 minutes
- Countries: United States; United Kingdom; Italy
- Language: English
- Budget: $12 million
- Box office: $27.5 million

Escape to Victory (released as Victory in some markets) is a 1981 sports war film directed by John Huston and starring Sylvester Stallone, Michael Caine, Max von Sydow, and Pelé. The film is about Allied prisoners of war who are interned in a German prison camp during the Second World War who play an exhibition match of football against a German team. An American, British, and Italian co-production, it was a remake of the 1961 Hungarian film Two Half Times in Hell.

The film received great attention upon its theatrical release, as it featured professional footballers Bobby Moore, Osvaldo Ardiles, Kazimierz Deyna, Paul Van Himst, Mike Summerbee, Hallvar Thoresen, Werner Roth and Pelé. Numerous Ipswich Town players were also in the film, including John Wark, Russell Osman, Laurie Sivell, Robin Turner and Kevin O'Callaghan. Other Ipswich Town players stood in for actors in the football scenes: Kevin Beattie for Michael Caine, and Paul Cooper for Sylvester Stallone.

Escape to Victory was entered into the 12th Moscow International Film Festival. It was released in the United States by Paramount Pictures on July 30, 1981.

== Plot ==
A team of Allied prisoners of war (POWs), coached and led by English Captain John Colby, a professional footballer for West Ham United before the war, agree to play an exhibition match against a German team, only to find themselves involved in a German propaganda stunt.

Colby is the captain and essentially the manager of the team and thus chooses his squad of players. Another POW, Robert Hatch, an American who is serving with the Canadian Army, is not initially chosen, but eventually nags the reluctant Colby into letting him on the team as the team's trainer, as Hatch needs to be with the team to facilitate his upcoming escape attempt.

Colby's superior officers repeatedly try to convince him to use the match as an opportunity for an escape attempt, but Colby consistently refuses, fearing that such an attempt will only result in getting his players killed. Meanwhile, Hatch has been planning his unrelated escape attempt, and Colby's superiors agree to help him if he in return agrees to journey to Paris, contact the French Resistance and try to convince them to help the football team escape.

Hatch succeeds in escaping the prison camp and finding the Resistance in Paris. The Resistance initially believes it will be too risky to aid the team's escape, but once they realise the game will be at the Colombes Stadium, they plan the escape using a tunnel from the Parisian sewer system to the showers in the players' changing room. They convince Hatch to let himself be recaptured so that he can pass this information back to the leading British officers at the prison camp.

Hatch is indeed recaptured. However, he is placed in solitary confinement, and thus the prisoners do not know if the French underground will help them. Colby tells the Germans that he needs Hatch on the team because Hatch is the backup goalkeeper and the starting goalkeeper has broken his arm. Colby himself actually has to break the starting goalkeeper's arm because the Germans want proof of the injury before they will allow Hatch to join the Allied lineup.

In the end, the POWs can leave the German camp only to play the match; they are to be imprisoned again afterward. The resistance's tunnelers break through to the Allied dressing room at halftime with the POWs trailing, 4–1. However, the team persuades Hatch to return to the pitch for the second half rather than lead the escape as planned.

Despite the match officials being heavily biased towards the Germans, and the German team causing several deliberate injuries to the Allied players, a 4–4 draw is achieved after great performances from Luis Fernandez, Carlos Rey and Terry Brady. Hatch plays goalkeeper and makes excellent saves, including a save of a penalty kick as time expires to deny the Germans the win. An Allied goal had been blatantly disallowed earlier in the match, so the POWs should have won, 5–4.

After Hatch preserves the draw, the crowd storms the field and swarms the players. Some of the spectators help the Allied players disguise themselves in the chaos with coats and other clothing so that they can escape, and they all burst through the gates to freedom.

== Cast ==
The Players
- Sylvester Stallone as Captain Robert Hatch (USA)
- Michael Caine as Captain John Colby (England)
- Pelé as Corporal Luis Fernandez (Brazil)
- Bobby Moore as Terry Brady (England)
- Osvaldo Ardiles as Carlos Rey (Argentina)
- Paul Van Himst as Michel Fileu (Belgium)
- Kazimierz Deyna as Paul Wolchek (Poland)
- Hallvar Thoresen as Gunnar Hilsson (Norway)
- Mike Summerbee as Sid Harmor (England)
- Co Prins as Pieter Van Beck (Netherlands)
- Russell Osman as Doug Clure (England)
- John Wark as Arthur Hayes (Scotland)
- Søren Lindsted as Erik Ball (Denmark)
- Kevin O'Callaghan as Tony Lewis (Ireland)

The Germans

- Max von Sydow as Major Karl von Steiner
- Gary Waldhorn as Hauptmann Rainer Mueller, German coach
- George Mikell as Kommandant
- Laurie Sivell as Schmidt, German goalkeeper
- Arthur Brauss as Hauptsturmführer Lutz
- Robin Turner as a German player
- Werner Roth as Baumann, German team captain
- Sándor Egervári as German Team Player (uncredited)
- Ferenc Fülöp as German Team Player (uncredited)
- Imre Boda as German Team Player (uncredited)

The French

- Amidou as André
- Benoît Ferreux as Jean-Paul Rémy
- Jean-François Stévenin as Claude
- Zoltán Gera as Viktor
- Carole Laure as Renée

The English

- Tim Pigott-Smith as Major Rose
- Julian Curry as Wing Commander Shurlock
- Clive Merrison as The Forger
- Maurice Roëves as Pyrie
- Michael Cochrane as Farrell
- Daniel Massey as Colonel Waldron

== Production ==
=== Development and writing ===
Filmed in Hungary, the film is based on the 1962 Hungarian film drama Két félidő a pokolban ("Two half-times in Hell"), which was directed by Zoltán Fábri and won the critics' award at the 1962 Boston Cinema Festival.

The film was inspired by the now discredited story of the so-called Death Match in which FC Dynamo Kyiv defeated German soldiers while Ukraine was occupied by German troops in World War II. According to myth, as a result of their victory, the Ukrainians were all shot. The true story is considerably more complex, as the team played a series of matches against German teams, emerging victorious in all of them, before any of them were sent to prison camps by the Gestapo. Four players were documented as being killed by the Germans but long after the dates of the matches they had won.

=== Football scenes ===
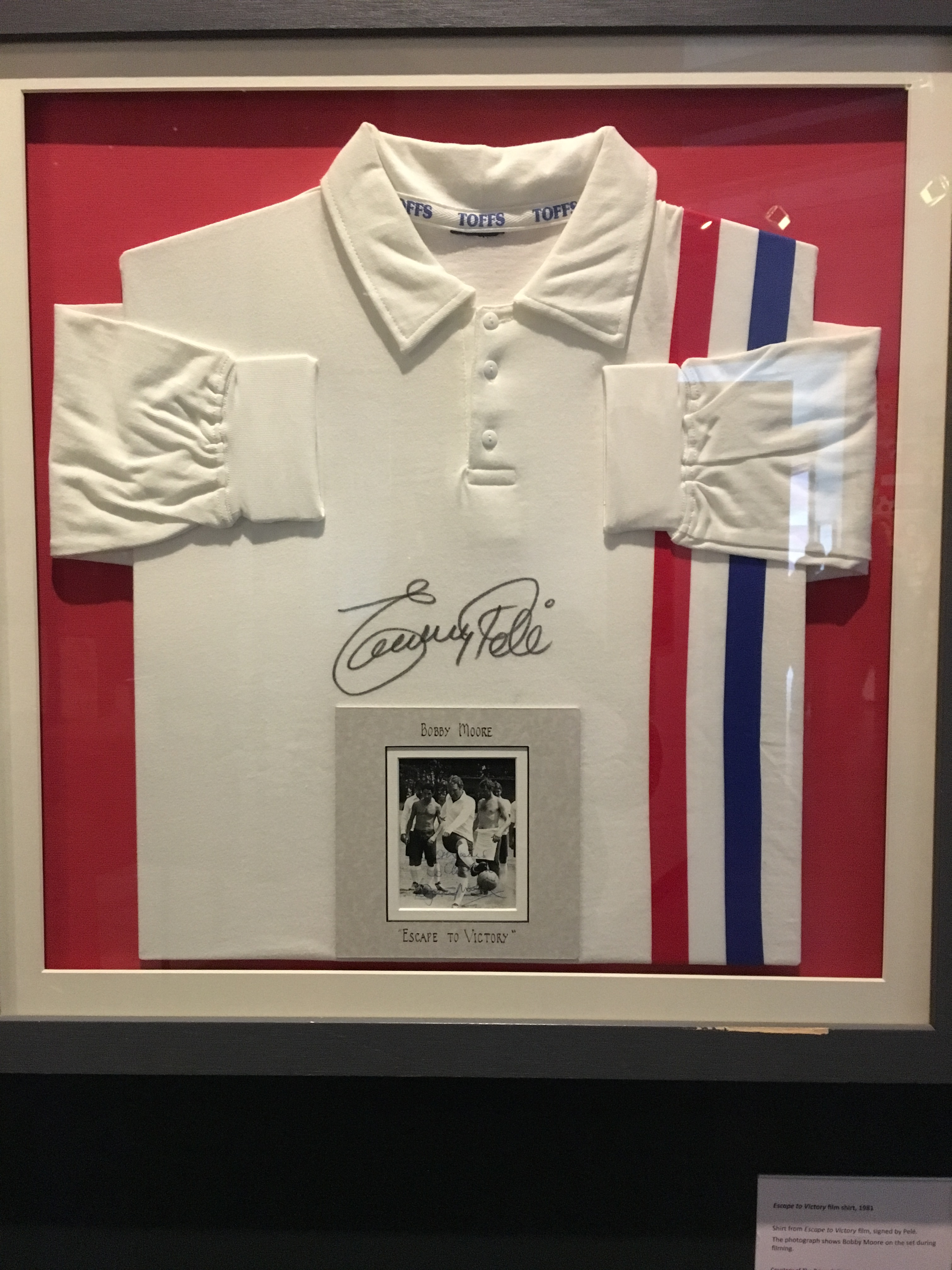
A football shirt used in the film, signed by Pelé

Escape to Victory featured a great many professional footballers as both the POW team and the German team. Many of the footballers came from the Ipswich Town squad, who were at the time one of the most successful teams in Europe. Despite not appearing on screen, English World Cup–winning goalkeeper Gordon Banks and Alan Thatcher were closely involved in the film, working with Sylvester Stallone on his goalkeeping scenes. Sports Illustrated magazine said "the game is marvelously photographed by Gerry Fisher, under second unit director Robert Riger."

Pelé received a credit for designing the "soccer plays". Since the movie is set in the early years of the German occupation of France (post-August 1942 as reference is made to being ‘captured at Dieppe’), Pelé's character, Corporal Luis Fernandez, is identified as being from Trinidad, not Brazil, since Brazilians did not officially join the war against the Axis powers until late August 1942, with the first contingents of the Brazilian Expeditionary Force arriving in Italy in July, 1944. No attempt is made to explain Kevin O'Callaghan's character (since Ireland never joined the war against the Axis powers) and Argentine star Osvaldo Ardiles' character, Carlos Rey, is not identified as being from any particular country.

=== Filming ===
Escape to Victory was filmed in and around Budapest, Hungary, portraying Paris and German-occupied France. The climactic football match of the Allies vs the German Wehrmacht team was filmed at the now-demolished MTK Stadium in the 8th district of Budapest, standing in for Colombes Stadium in Paris. MTK Stadium was chosen because it was the largest stadium without floodlights (which were largely unknown in the 1940s) the producers could find and was also structurally similar to Continental stadiums that were around during World War II.

The P.O.W. camp scenes were filmed in a field in Fót, approximately 13 kilometers northeast from Budapest, situated behind the Mafilm Studios. The set with the POW barracks and soccer field took two months to construct. Other Budapest locations in the film included Keleti Railway Station, the historic Metro Line 1, and soundstages at Mafilm's main studio complex in the 14th district.

Sylvester Stallone broke his finger while trying to block a penalty kick from Pelé during filming.

== Music ==
American composer Bill Conti wrote the score, which borrows heavily from the first and last movements of Dmitri Shostakovich's Symphony No. 7, the Leningrad Symphony, particularly the march theme of the first movement, which is quoted almost verbatim. (Conti would later employ a similar practice when repurposing much of Pyotr Ilyich Tchaikovsky's Violin Concerto for the film The Right Stuff.) Though Shostakovich's Symphony No. 7 was purportedly meant to represent the resistance to repressive Nazism when it debuted during World War II, he privately commented that it was a musical criticism of all tyranny and oppression, including in his native Soviet Union under Joseph Stalin.

At the end of the film, the last part of Shostakovich's Symphony No. 5 is also used to signify the triumphant conclusion of the story. However, while the music may fulfil the final moments of Escape to Victory's exultant ending explicitly, it is believed Shostakovich wrote the ending to his symphony to imply forced rejoicing under an authoritarian force. More prosaically, the music also pays tribute to Elmer Bernstein’s score for The Great Escape.

In 2005, the Prometheus Records label issued a limited edition soundtrack album of Conti's score.

== Reception ==
=== Critical response ===
Stanley Kauffmann of The New Republic wrote that the movie "...wavers between insulting and uproariously stupid." Film historian Leonard Maltin seemed to agree: "...Only the rightly-celebrated soccer scenes redeem this silly bore."

On Rotten Tomatoes the film has a 70% rating based on reviews from 10 critics. On Metacritic, the film is rated 57 out of 100 based on 10 critic reviews. Audiences polled by CinemaScore gave the film an average grade of "A-" on an A+ to F scale.

== Possible remake ==
In June 2014, it was announced that Doug Liman was in talks to direct a remake with Gavin O'Connor and Anthony Tambakis writing the script. In March 2019, it was announced that Jaume Collet-Serra was in talks to direct, with Tambakis doing a further rewrite of the script.

== In art ==
The whole audio recording of the second half of the match played in the film has been broadcast from a radio inside the Italian Pavilion of the 59° Esposizione Internazionale d'Arte La Biennale di Venezia, made by Gian Maria Tosatti in 2022 and curated by Eugenio Viola.

== See also ==
- List of association football films
