= Ipswich Town F.C. =

Association football club in Ipswich, England

Ipswich Town
- Full name: Ipswich Town Football Club
- Nicknames: The Blues; The Tractor Boys
- Founded: 16 October 1878; 148 years ago
- Ground: Portman Road
- Capacity: 30,056
- Owner: Gamechanger 20 Ltd
- Chairman: Mark Ashton
- Manager: Gary O'Neil
- League: Premier League
- 2025–26: EFL Championship, 2nd of 24 (promoted)
- Website: itfc.co.uk
Home colours	Away colours	Third colours

Ipswich Town Football Club is a professional football club based in Ipswich, Suffolk, England. The club competes in the Premier League, the top tier of English football.

Ipswich Town were founded in 1878 but did not turn professional until 1936; the club was elected to the Football League in 1938. Ipswich won the league title in 1961–62, their first season in the top flight, and finished runners-up in 1980–81 and 1981–82. They finished in the top six in the First Division for ten years, and won the FA Cup in 1978 and UEFA Cup in 1981. They have never lost at home in European competition, having defeated Real Madrid, AC Milan, Inter Milan, Lazio and Barcelona.

Ipswich Town have played their home games at Portman Road since 1884. The club's traditional home colours are blue shirts with white shorts and blue socks. They have a long-standing rivalry with Norwich City, against whom they contest the East Anglian derby.

== History ==
=== Early years and entry to the Football League (1878–1954) ===
The club was founded as an amateur team in 1878 and were known as Ipswich A.F.C. until 1888 when they merged with Ipswich Rugby Club to form Ipswich Town Football Club. The team won a number of local cup competitions, including the Suffolk Challenge Cup and the Suffolk Senior Cup. After playing in the Norfolk & Suffolk League from 1899 and the South East Anglian League between 1903 and 1906, they joined the Southern Amateur League in 1907 and, with results improving steadily, became champions in the 1921–22 season. The club won the league a further three times, in 1929–30, 1932–33 and 1933–34, before becoming founder members of the Eastern Counties Football League at the end of the 1934–35 season. A year later, the club turned professional and joined the Southern League, which they won in its first season and finished third in the next.

Ipswich were elected to the Football League on 30 May 1938, and played in the Third Division South until the end of the 1953–54 season, when they won the title and promotion to the Second Division.

=== Promotion and First Division success (1954–1963) ===
The club were immediately relegated back to the Third Division South the following year at the end of a poor season, but made better progress after Scott Duncan was replaced as team manager by Alf Ramsey in August 1955. The club won the Third Division South title again in 1956–57, and returned to the higher division. This time, Ipswich established themselves in the Second Division, and as the division champions, won promotion to the top level of English football, the First Division, in 1960–61.

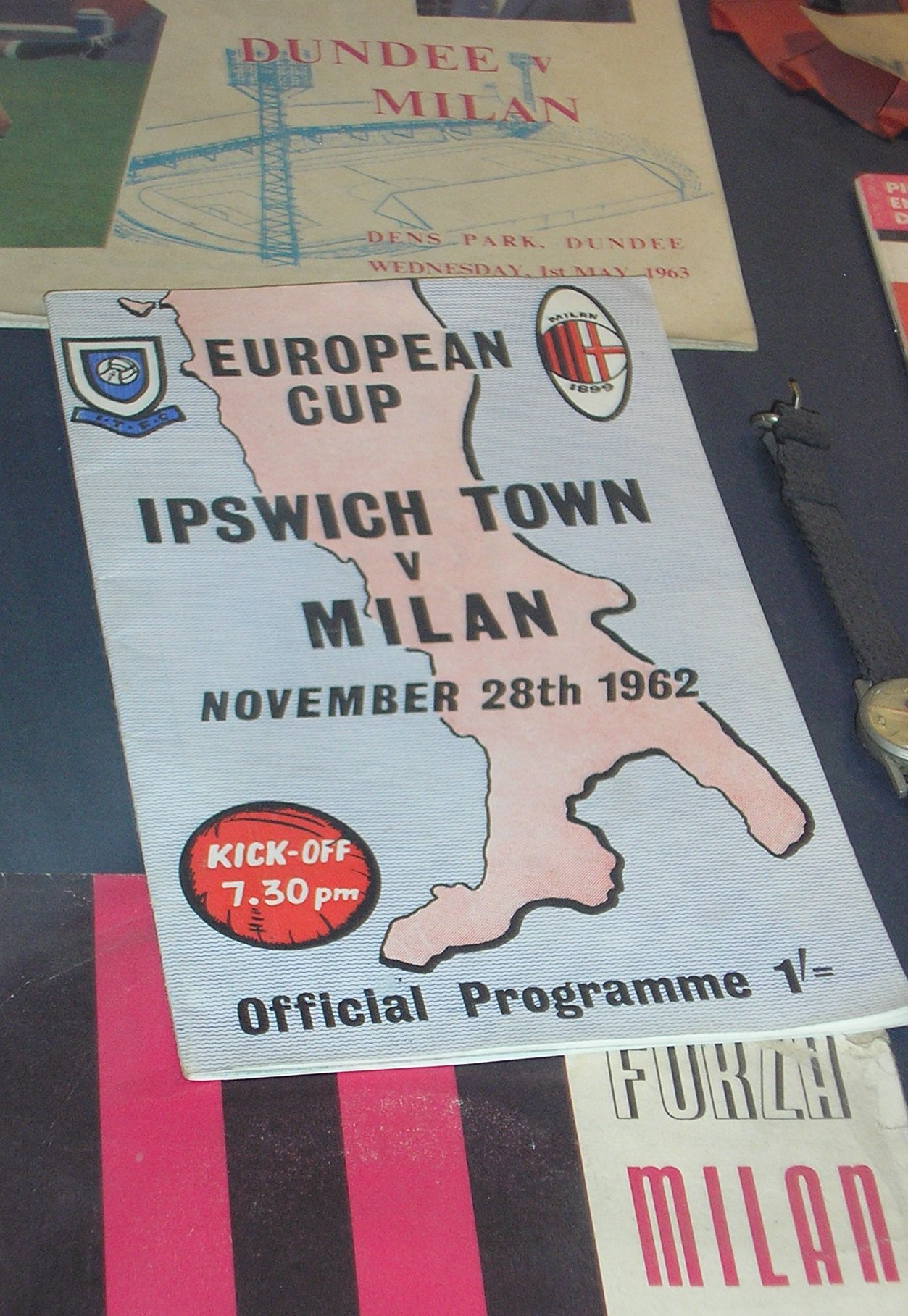
Ipswich – AC Milan 1962–63 European Cup programme, on display at the San Siro museum in 2005

In the top flight for the first time, Ipswich became champions of the Football League at the first attempt in 1961–62. As English league champions, they qualified for the 1962–63 European Cup, defeating Maltese team Floriana 14–1 on aggregate before losing to AC Milan. Ramsey left the club in April 1963 to take charge of the England national team. Under his leadership the England team won the 1966 World Cup. He received a knighthood for "services to football" in 1967.

=== Decline and revival after Ramsey (1963–1969) ===
Ramsey was replaced by Jackie Milburn, under whose leadership fortunes on the pitch plummeted. Two years after winning the league title, Ipswich slipped down to the Second Division in 1964, conceding 121 league goals in 42 games – one of the worst-ever defensive records in English senior football. Milburn quit after just one full season and was replaced by Bill McGarry in 1964. The club remained in the Second Division for four years until McGarry guided Ipswich to promotion along with his assistant Sammy Chung in the 1967–68 season, winning the division by a single point ahead of Queens Park Rangers. During the summer of 1968, Steve Stacey, signed from fourth division team Wrexham, went on to make his debut on 14 September 1968 becoming the first black player to represent the club in the football league. McGarry left to manage Wolves and was replaced by Bobby Robson in January 1969.

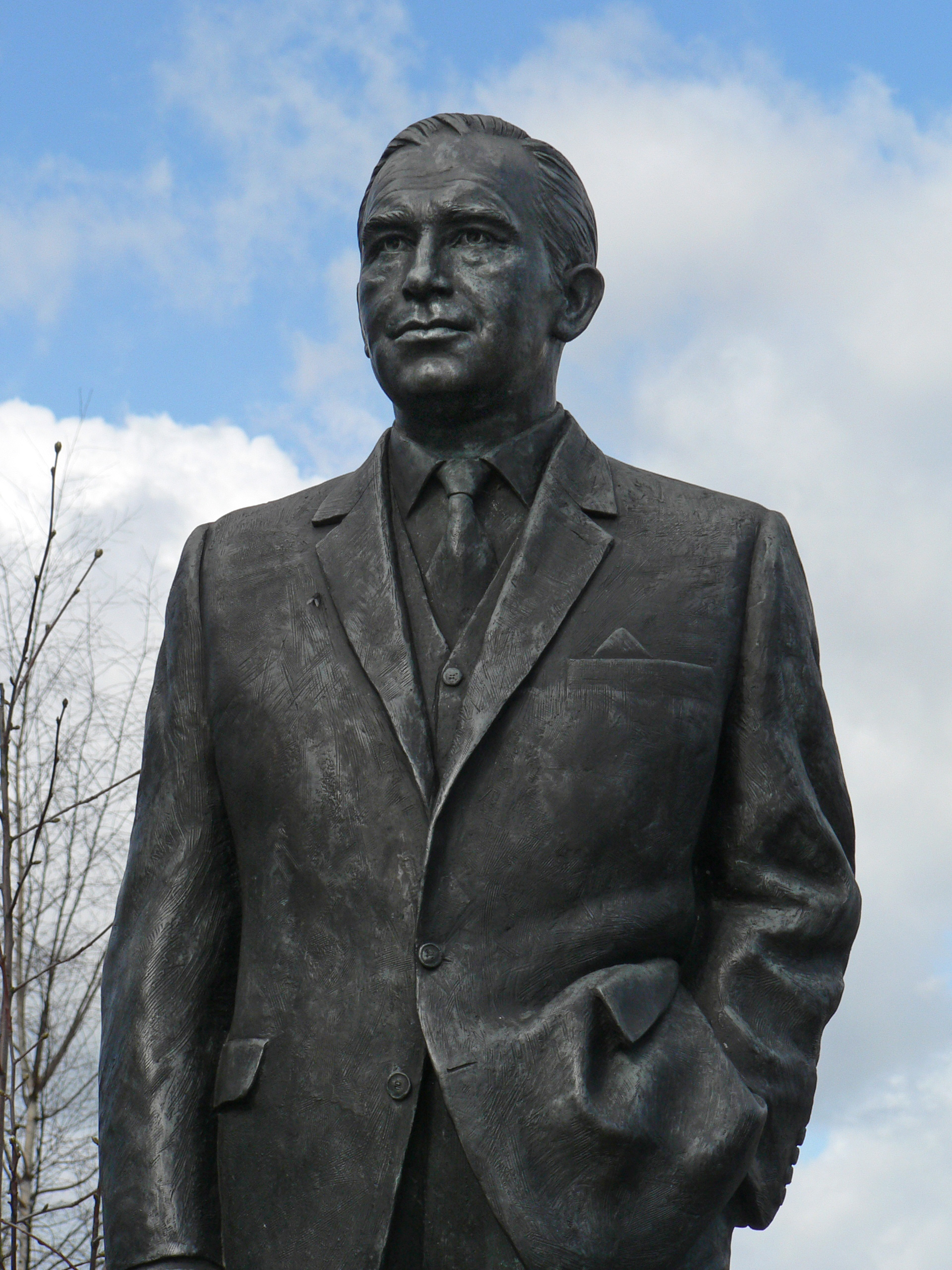
Statue of Sir Alf Ramsey at Portman Road

=== The Bobby Robson era (1969–1982) ===
Robson led Ipswich to two major trophies and several seasons in top flight European football. The successful period began in 1973 when the club won the Texaco Cup and finished fourth in the league, qualifying for the UEFA Cup for the first time. In the 1974–75 season they reached the semi-finals of the FA Cup for the first time, losing to West Ham United after a replay, and finished third in the league. By the late 1970s, Robson had built a strong team with talent in every department, introducing the Dutch pair Arnold Mühren and Frans Thijssen to add flair to a team that featured British internationals including John Wark, Terry Butcher and Paul Mariner, although the Ipswich squad perhaps lacked the depth of established big clubs like Liverpool and Manchester United. Ipswich regularly featured in the top five of the league and in the UEFA Cup. At their peak in the 1979–80 season, they beat Manchester United 6–0 in a league game at Portman Road, a game where United goalkeeper Gary Bailey also saved three penalties. The defeat cost United two points – the margin which eventually separated them and champions Liverpool. Major success came in 1978 when Ipswich beat Arsenal at Wembley Stadium to win their only FA Cup trophy. The triumph was followed by almost winning the triple in 1980–81. Ipswich led the top division for most of the season and were on course to win a second league title plus FA Cup and European honours. However, injuries and fixture congestion (a squad of thirteen players played over sixty matches) took its toll and Ipswich ultimately came runners up to Aston Villa (a team they had beaten home and away in the league and in the FA Cup) and were semi-finalists in the FA Cup. Ipswich did win the UEFA Cup, however, in 1981 with a 5–4 victory over AZ Alkmaar in the two-legged final. The run to the final included a 4–1 win at Saint-Étienne, captained by Michel Platini. The club also finished league runners-up in the subsequent 1981–82 season.

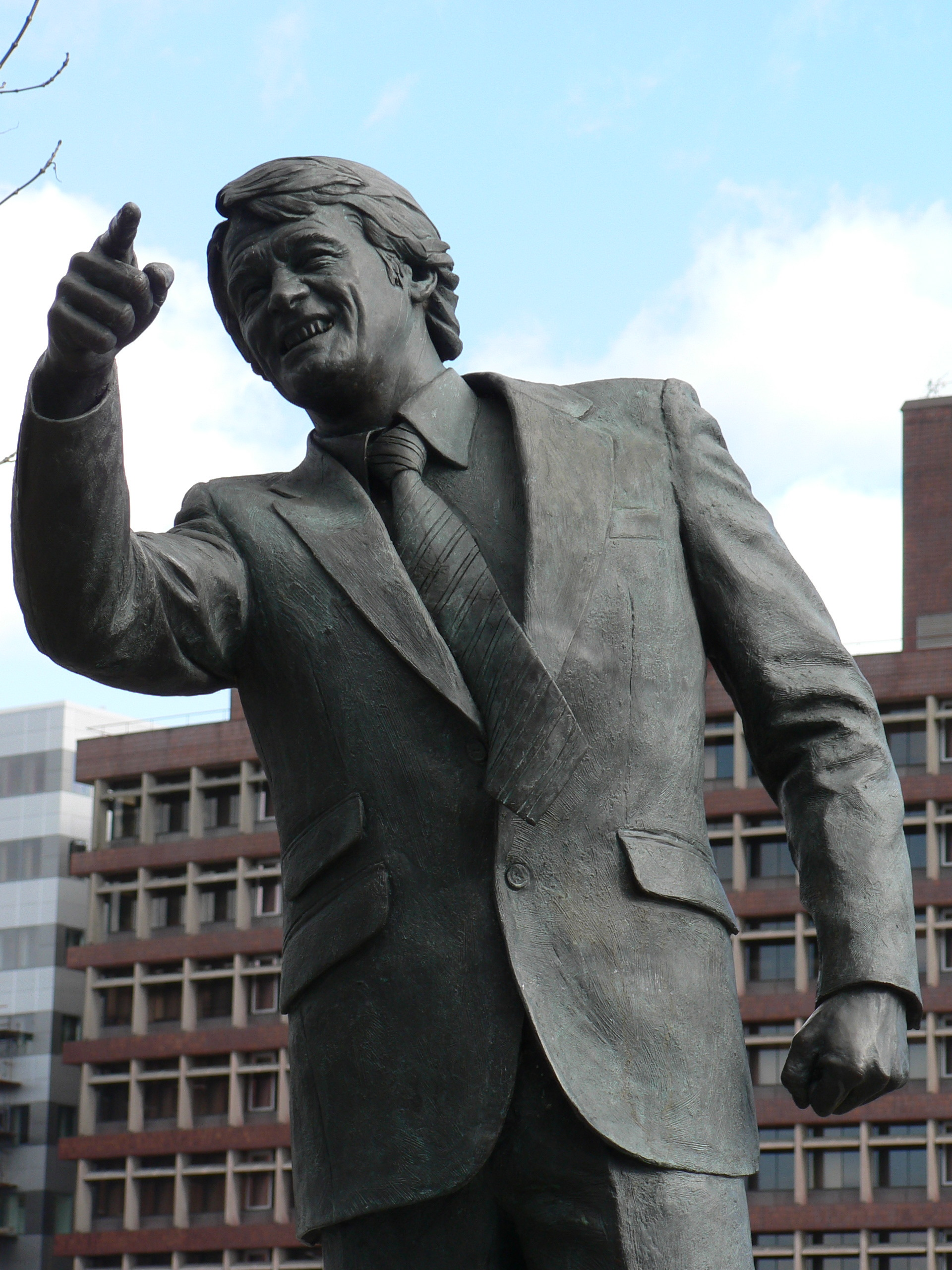
Statue of Sir Bobby Robson at Portman Road

Robson's success with Ipswich attracted the attention of many bigger clubs, and he was linked with the Manchester United job when Dave Sexton was sacked in May 1981, but the job went to Ron Atkinson instead. The Football Association lured Robson away from Portman Road a year later, when he accepted their offer to manage the England national team in July 1982.

=== Relegation after Robson and promotion under Lyall (1982–1994) ===
Robson's successor at Ipswich was his assistant manager Bobby Ferguson. Under Ferguson, Town finished mid-table twice, but worsening performances meant that they began to struggle in the top division. The recent construction of an expensive new stand at Portman Road limited the club's budget, despite the money gained from sales of key players including Thijssen and Wark.

Ipswich were finally relegated to the Second Division at the end of the 1985–86 season. Butcher, the last remaining key player from the successful 1981 team, was sold to Rangers that summer. Ferguson, who had remained in charge despite the relegation, left the club in May 1987 after his contract expired, following Ipswich's failure to return to the First Division. Ipswich Town were then managed by John Duncan for three years until he was replaced by former West Ham United boss John Lyall in May 1990, with Ipswich still in the Second Division. Lyall guided Ipswich to the Second Division title and promotion to the new FA Premier League, ready for the 1992–93 season. Suffering only two league defeats before the New Year, Ipswich started the season well and were fourth in the Premier League in January 1993, but a dip in form during the final weeks of the season saw them finish 16th. The 1993-94 season saw a good start followed by a slump, with a shortage of goals and a long winless run towards the end of the campaign meaning that Ipswich only avoided relegation due to Sheffield United conceding a late goal in a 3–2 defeat at Chelsea on the final day of the season. Ipswich continued to struggle in the 1994-95 season, and Lyall resigned in December 1994 with the club bottom of the Premiership.

=== Relegation and revival under George Burley (1994–2002) ===
Lyall's successor, George Burley, was unable to turn team performances around, and Ipswich were dealt a Premiership record defeat, 9–0, at Manchester United, on their way to relegation. Back in the second tier of the league, Burley led the club to three consecutive promotion playoffs, but they were to endure defeats in all three semi-finals. Ipswich finally returned to the Premiership in 2000 after coming from behind to beat Barnsley 4–2 in the last Division One playoff final at Wembley Stadium. Ipswich performed well in the Premiership in their first season with Burley's team finishing in an impressive fifth place—being pipped by Liverpool on the last day of the season for a place in the Champions League. Consolation was a UEFA Cup place and FA Premier League Manager of the Year Award for Burley.

However, the following season was not so successful. The team took only one win in their opening seventeen league games, leaving them bottom in December. Despite a good run of form in January and February, Burley could not save the club from relegation back to the Championship at the end of the season. The loss of income due to relegation also led to the club going into financial administration. There was the minor consolation of again qualifying for the UEFA Cup, this time via the UEFA Fair Play ranking, and Ipswich survived two ties before losing in the second round proper to Czech team Slovan Liberec. A slow start to the season, culminating in a 0–3 defeat at struggling Grimsby Town, meant that Burley was sacked in October 2002 after nearly eight years as manager.

=== Years in the Championship (2002–2019) ===
First team coach Tony Mowbray was given four matches as caretaker manager, winning once, but he was ultimately replaced as manager by the former Oldham Athletic, Everton and Manchester City manager Joe Royle, who had played for local rival Norwich City. Royle inherited a team struggling near the Division One relegation zone, but revived fortunes such that the team narrowly failed to reach the playoffs. The 2003–04 season saw the club come out of administration and continue to challenge for promotion back to the Premier League. They finished that season in fifth, but were defeated in the playoff semi-finals by West Ham United.

Narrowly missing automatic promotion in 2004–05, Royle again took Ipswich to the play-offs, but once more they lost to West Ham United in the semi-finals. 2005–06 saw Ipswich finish in 15th place—the club's lowest finish since 1966. Joe Royle resigned by mutual consent on 11 May 2006, and a month later, Jim Magilton was officially announced as the new manager. In November 2007, the club were involved in takeover discussions with both businessman Marcus Evans and former Birmingham City director David Sullivan. In December 2007, Evans completed his takeover of the club, purchasing an 87.5% stake in the club, investing around £44 million, which included the purchase of the club's existing £32 million debt. The club agreed a sponsorship deal with the Marcus Evans Group on 20 May 2008, lasting until 2018, the longest in the club's history.

After failing to reach the playoffs despite substantial investment, Magilton was sacked in April 2009, and new Chief Executive Simon Clegg replaced him with former Manchester United player, Roy Keane. Keane's spell as manager came to an end after an unsuccessful 18 months, when he was sacked in January 2011, to be replaced briefly by Ian McParland in a caretaker role before Paul Jewell took the reins on a permanent basis. A poor start to the 2012–13 season with Ipswich bottom of the Championship after winning only one of their first twelve games, led to Jewell leaving his position on 24 October 2012 by mutual consent.

He was replaced temporarily by Chris Hutchings for a single match in a caretaker role, before former Wolves boss Mick McCarthy was appointed full-time on 1 November 2012. McCarthy led Ipswich to avoid relegation, taking them from bottom of the league in November to finish in 14th position. The following season produced a 9th-place finish and in the 2014–15 season a 6th place and play-off finish – though the club lost in the semi-finals to local rivals Norwich City 4–2 on aggregate. Ipswich ended the 2016–17 season in 16th place, their lowest finish since the 1958–59 season. McCarthy announced that he would be leaving the club at the end of the 2017–18 season on 23 March 2018, though he ultimately left the role early with four games to go. He was replaced until the end of the season by Bryan Klug as a caretaker manager and Ipswich finished the season in 12th.

On 30 May 2018, Paul Hurst was announced as the new manager of the club on a three-year contract. However, after a poor start to the season and with the team bottom of the table, Hurst was sacked in October 2018 after less than five months in charge – making him the shortest serving manager in the club's history. He was replaced by former Norwich City manager Paul Lambert, but he was unable to prevent relegation to League One at the end of the 2018–19 season, ending Ipswich's 63-year stay in the top two tiers of English football.

=== League One, the Gamechanger era and the rise to the Premier League (2019–present) ===
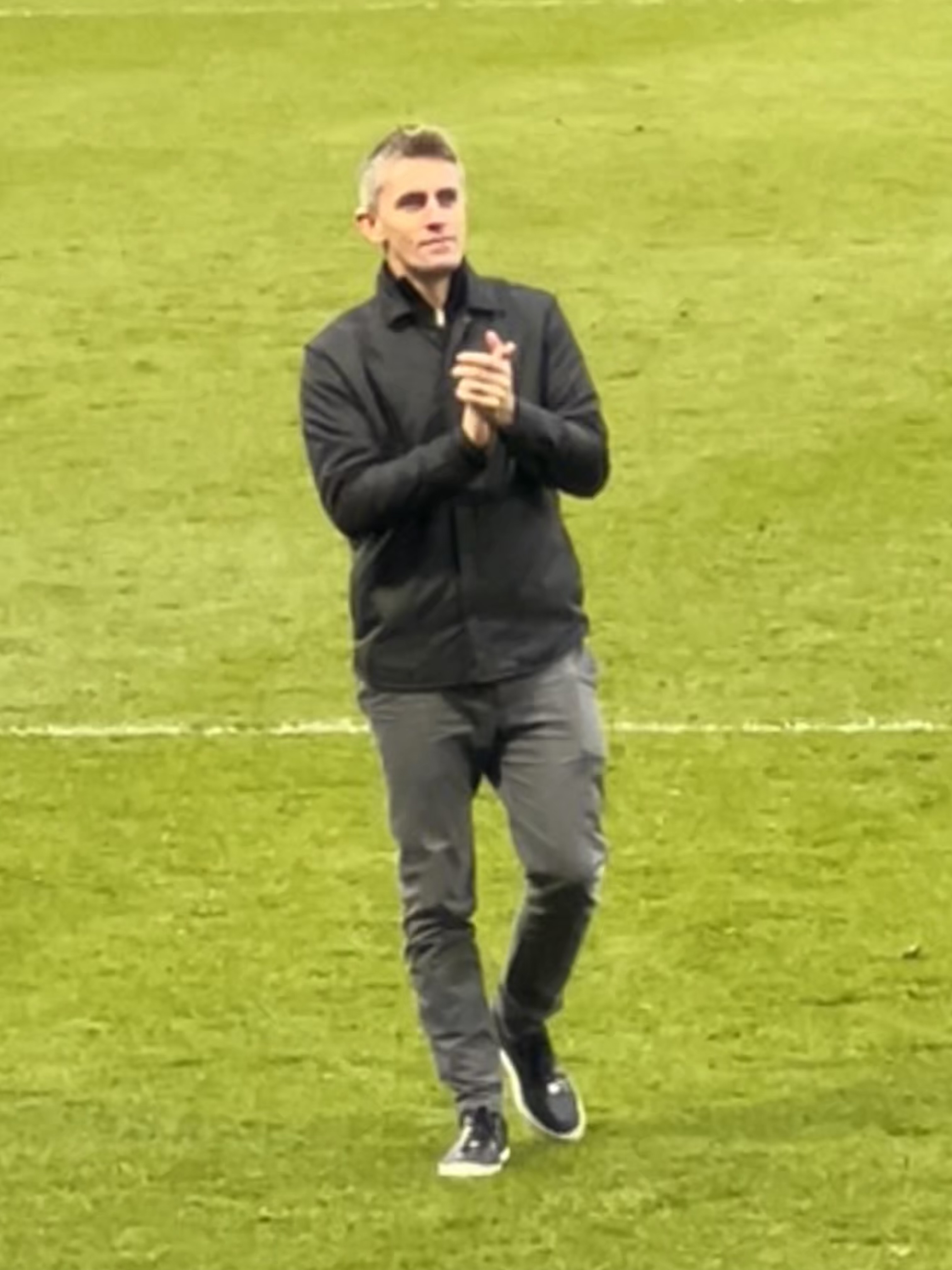
Kieran McKenna was appointed as manager of Ipswich Town in December 2021.

Lambert remained as manager following relegation to take charge of Ipswich's first season in the third tier since 1957. Ipswich finished the season in 11th place, the club's lowest finish since 1953. The standings were decided by points-per-game due to the season's suspension in March 2020 as a result of the COVID-19 pandemic. After failing to mount a promotion challenge during the following season, Lambert left the club by mutual consent on 28 February 2021. Former Wigan boss Paul Cook was appointed as his replacement three days later.

On 7 April 2021, the club announced that US investment group Gamechanger 20 Limited had purchased a majority stake in the club. The consortium was made up of Ohio-based investment group ORG Portfolio Management, the "Three Lions Fund" (made up of three Phoenix Rising board members, including Brett M. Johnson, Berke Bakay and Mark Detmer) and former owner Marcus Evans, who remained as a minority shareholder. Mike O'Leary, former West Bromwich Albion chief executive, was appointed as the club's chairman following the acquisition.

Ipswich finished the 2020–21 season in ninth place, three places outside the play-offs. Expectations were high ahead of the following season, but following a series of disappointing results, Cook was sacked in December 2021. He was replaced by Kieran McKenna, first-team coach at Manchester United. Ipswich finished the 2021–22 season in 11th place.

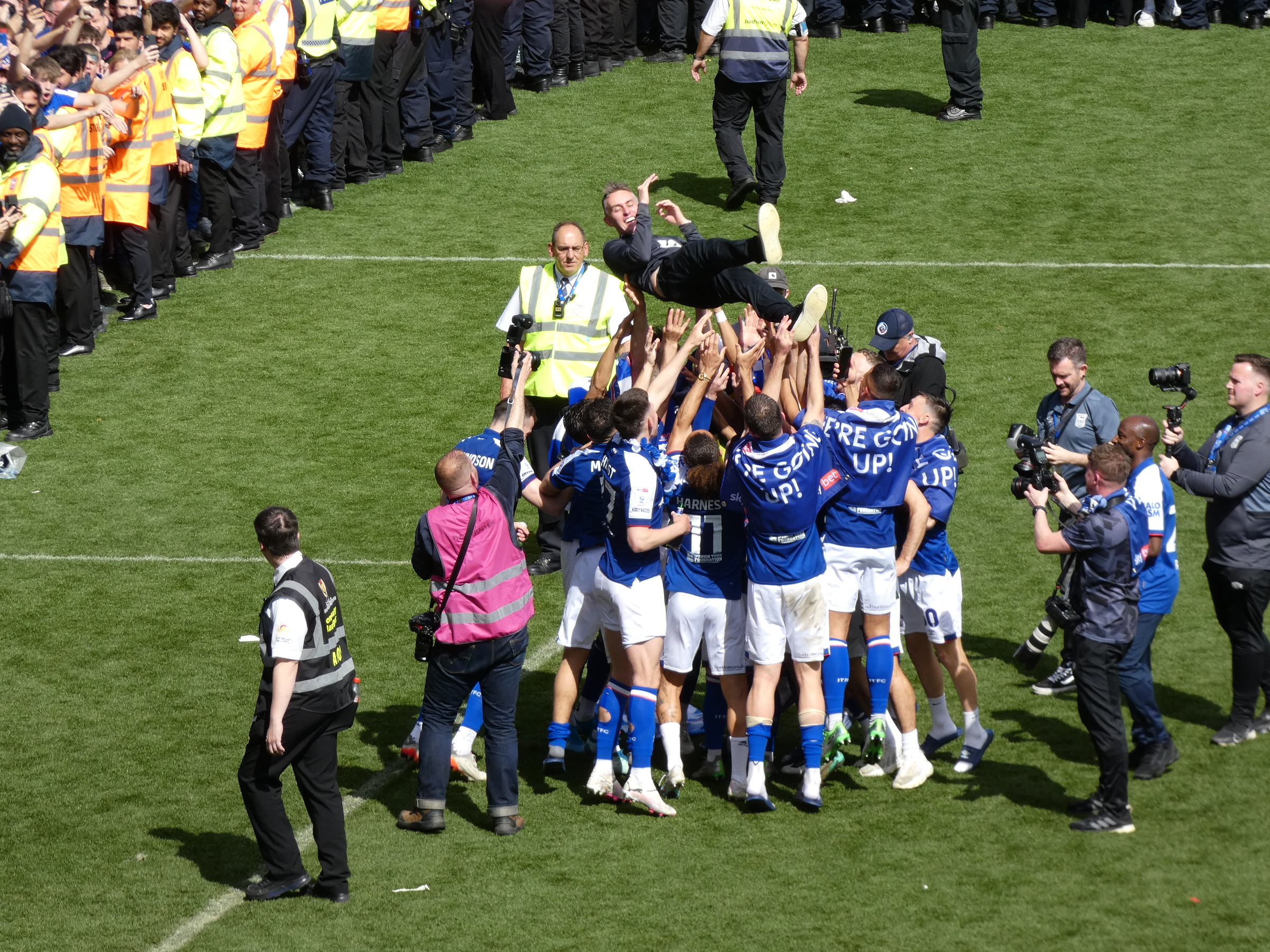
Kieran McKenna and players celebrate on the pitch after Ipswich Town seal back-to-back promotions in May 2024.

With McKenna's first full season in charge, the following season proved more successful. After an undefeated streak of 18 league games, with several club records broken, Ipswich were promoted back to the Championship as runners-up. Ipswich finished the 2022–23 season in second place, with 98 points and scoring 101 league goals.

After winning their final league game of the 2023–24 season, Ipswich achieved back-to-back promotions, becoming the fifth team to do so, and were promoted as runners-up to end their 22-year absence from the top tier. They sealed the runner-up spot with 96 points, and the highest goal tally of 92.

Ipswich spent most of the 2024–25 season in the bottom half of the league and in the relegation zone. On 26 April 2025, following a 3–0 defeat away to Newcastle United, the club was relegated back to the Championship. They returned to the Premier League at the first time of asking after winning their final league game of the 2025–26 season against QPR.

Following promotion back to the Premier League, it was announced on 10 June 2026 Kieran McKenna would step down as manager and football management as a whole to focus his time with his family. On 23 June 2026, Town announced the appointment of Gary O'Neil from Ligue 1 side Strasbourg as the new manager on a three-year deal.

== Crest and colours ==
Crest used from 1972 to 1995

=== Crest ===
Ipswich Town's shirts did not sport a crest until the mid-1960s, when they adopted a design based on the Ipswich coat of arms, featuring a gold lion rampant guardant on a red background on the left half and three gold ramparts on a blue background on the right half. In 1972, the crest was redesigned as the result of a competition, won by the Treasurer of the Supporters Club, John Gammage. Each element of the new design was intended to represent the region.

"I regarded the Suffolk Punch as a noble animal, well suited to dominate our design and represent the club. And to complete the badge I thought of the town of Ipswich which contains many historical buildings, including the Wolsey Gate, and is close to the sea with a large dock area."

This crest was re-used on the home and goalkeeper kit during the 2020–21 season, in commemoration of the 40th anniversary of Ipswich's UEFA Cup triumph. The crest was modified in 1995 after consultation with a Supporters Forum, with the turrets of the Wolsey Gate moved to the top of the crest, the yellow background changed to red, the Suffolk Punch given a more dominant physique and the F.C. expanded to Football Club. Three stars were added to the sleeve of the team's away shirt for the 2004–05 season, and also to the home kit for the 2005–06 season. These stars were added to represent the three major trophies which Ipswich Town have won; the FA Cup, the UEFA Cup and the old First Division. The stars were relocated directly above the crest when the shirt was redesigned prior to the 2007–08 season, with them being moved again in 2022–23 to the back of the shirt.

Ipswich's orange away kit used during the 1999–2000 season

=== Colours ===
Ipswich Town's traditional home colours are blue shirts with white shorts and blue socks. One of Ipswich Town's nicknames is The Blues, stemming from their traditional kit. The club's first registered colours were blue and white striped shirts with black shorts. All-blue shirts and white shorts were first worn in the 1936–37 season, following the clubs entry into the Southern Football League after turning professional. These have stood as the primary colours of the club's home kits ever since.

Since turning professional, Ipswich have used a number of away colours, including white, orange, red and black vertical stripes, claret and green, cream and black vertical stripes and dark blue and claret. In 2006, the club donated 500 orange and blue-and-white shirts to children in Iraq.

=== Kit suppliers and sponsors ===
In 1981, Ipswich Town announced a sponsorship deal with Japanese-based electronics company Pioneer Corporation, who became the first official sponsors of the club. Pioneer Corporation also sponsored the west stand of the club's Portman Road stadium up until 1999, formerly known as the West Stand. Pioneer would continue to sponsor the club's kits until 1985, when a new sponsorship deal was agreed with local Suffolk radio station Radio Orwell. The radio station would only sponsor the club's kits for a single season before being replaced with pharmaceutical and horticultural chemical manufacturers Fisons. Fisons were the main sponsors of the club from the 1986–87 season through to the 1994–95 season, including the 1991–92 season when the club won the Second Division championship and gained promotion to the inaugural season of the newly founded Premier League.

Since then Ipswich have had multiple kit sponsors, including Suffolk-based brewing company Greene King from 1995 to 2001, and the energy companies TXU Energi (2001–2003), Powergen (2003–2006) and E.ON (2006–2008). After the club's takeover by Marcus Evans in 2007, Marcus Evans Group became the club's new primary sponsor and would go on to be the football club's main sponsor from 2008 until 2018. In January 2018, the club agreed a new three year sponsorship deal worth almost £2 million with British online casino company Magical Vegas. In May 2020, Magical Vegas revealed that they had donated the final year of their shirt sponsor rights to The Carers Trust charity for the 2020–21 season. On 6 May 2021, the club announced that popular artist and longtime Ipswich fan Ed Sheeran would be the club's new shirt sponsor for the 2021–22 season, a deal which was later extended to cover until the end of the 2024–25 season. On 14 June 2022, Ipswich announced that the club had signed a 4-year contract with Umbro to become the new kit manufacturers for both the Men's and Women's teams, marking the first time since 1995 that Ipswich's kits were made by Umbro.

Period	Kit manufacturer	Shirt sponsor	Secondary shirt sponsor	Shorts sponsor
1975–1977	Umbro	—	—	—
1977–1981	Adidas	—	—	—
1981–1985	Adidas	Pioneer	—	—
1985–1986	Adidas	Radio Orwell	—	—
1986–1989	Adidas	Fisons	—	—
1989–1995	Umbro	Fisons	—	—
1995–2001	Punch	Greene King	—	—
2001–2003	Punch	TXU Energi	—	—
2003–2006	Punch	Powergen	—	—
2006–2007	Punch	E.ON	—	—
2007–2008	Mitre	E.ON	—	—
2008–2014	Mitre	Marcus Evans Group	—	—
2014–2017	Adidas	Marcus Evans Group	—	—
2017–2018	Adidas	Marcus Evans Group	East Anglian Children's Hospices	—
2018–2019	Adidas	Magical Vegas	East Anglian Children's Hospices	Nicholas Estates
2019–2020	Adidas	Magical Vegas	East Anglian Air Ambulance	Nicholas Estates
2020–2021	Adidas	Carers Trust	Thank You NHS	Mortgagemove
2021–2022	Adidas	+–=÷× Tour (Ed Sheeran)	Thank You NHS	Mortgagemove
2022–2025	Umbro	+–=÷× Tour (Ed Sheeran)	Ipswich Town Foundation	Mortgagemove
2025–	Umbro	Halo	MSC Cruises	Fleximize

== Stadium ==
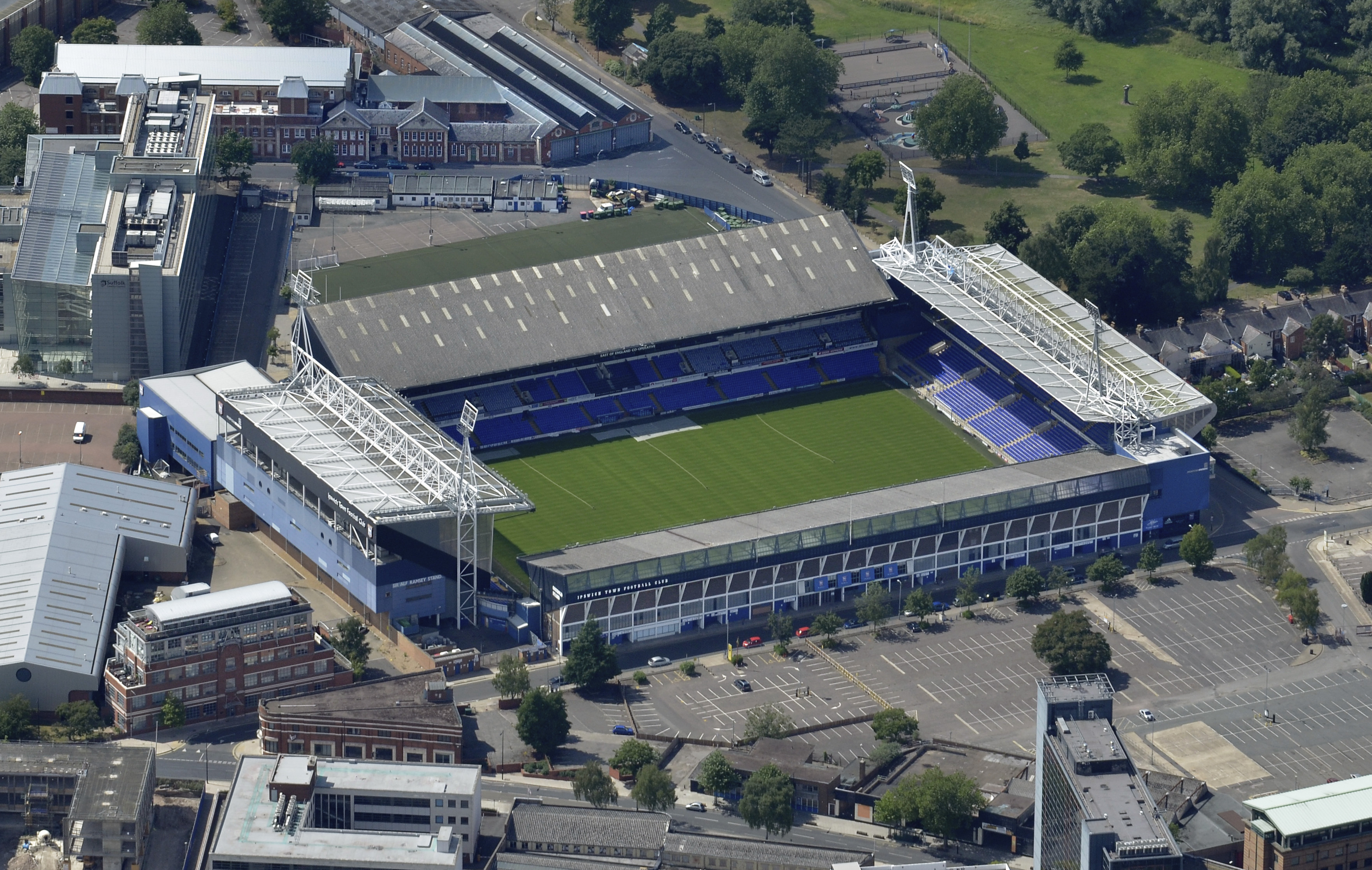
Aerial view of Portman Road

Between 1878 and 1884, Ipswich Town played at two grounds in the town, Broomhill and Brook's Hall, but in 1884, the club moved to Portman Road and have played there ever since. At their new home, Ipswich became one of the first clubs to implement the use of goal nets, in 1890, but the more substantial elements of ground development did not begin until, in 1901, a tobacco processing plant was built along the south edge of the ground. The first stand, a wooden structure, was built on the Portman Road side of the pitch in 1905. In 1911 the roof was blown off, and the ground was later commandeered by the British Army for the duration of World War I. The club turned professional in 1936, and work began on the first bank of terracing at the north end of the pitch. The following year, on the back of winning the Southern League, a similar terrace was built at the southern 'Churchmans' end.

All sides were terraced by 1954, and floodlights were erected in 1959 for use in lower light conditions. The two-tier Portman Stand was built along the east side of the ground in place of the existing terraces in 1971, and the West Stand was extended in 1982 by the addition of a third tier. The rebuilt West Stand was renamed the Pioneer Stand as a result of the club's sponsorship by the electronics company Pioneer Corporation and was converted to all-seating in 1990. In 1992, following the recommendations of the Taylor Report in the wake of the Hillsborough disaster three years earlier, the terraces in both the north and south stands were also converted to all-seating, creating the first complete all-seater stadium in the top flight of English football - post Taylor Report (Highfield Road was previously all-seater in the early 1980s), with a spectator capacity of 22,600.

Success that took place on the pitch led to further investment in the infrastructure, with the club spending over £22 million on redeveloping both North and South stands, resulting in a current capacity of 30,311, making it the largest-capacity football stadium in East Anglia. In the past ten years, statues of both Sir Alf Ramsey and Sir Bobby Robson have been unveiled outside the stadium. The North Stand was renamed in honour of former manager Sir Bobby Robson in September 2009. On 31 March 2012, in conjunction with celebrations of the 50th anniversary of Ipswich Town winning the First Division, the South Stand was renamed in honour of Ipswich and England's former manager Alf Ramsey. Portman Road now features two stands named after their two most successful managers in the club's history, as well as being England's two most successful managers. On 10 July 2012, the West Stand, formerly known as the Pioneer Stand and the Britannia Stand, was renamed the East of England Co-operative Stand following a sponsorship deal with the East of England Co-operative Society. The Co-op's sponsorship lasted until 2021, when it was not renewed and returned to be simply the West Stand.

The East Stand of Portman Road, formerly known as the Portman Stand, is called the Cobbold Stand, named after the former owners of the club. The playing surface at Portman Road is highly regarded and has been voted best pitch in the league on a number of occasions. The former groundsman, Alan Ferguson, received a number of accolades, including both Premiership and Championship Groundsman of the Year. The stadium has also hosted many England youth international matches, and one senior England friendly international match, against Croatia in 2003.

== Supporters ==
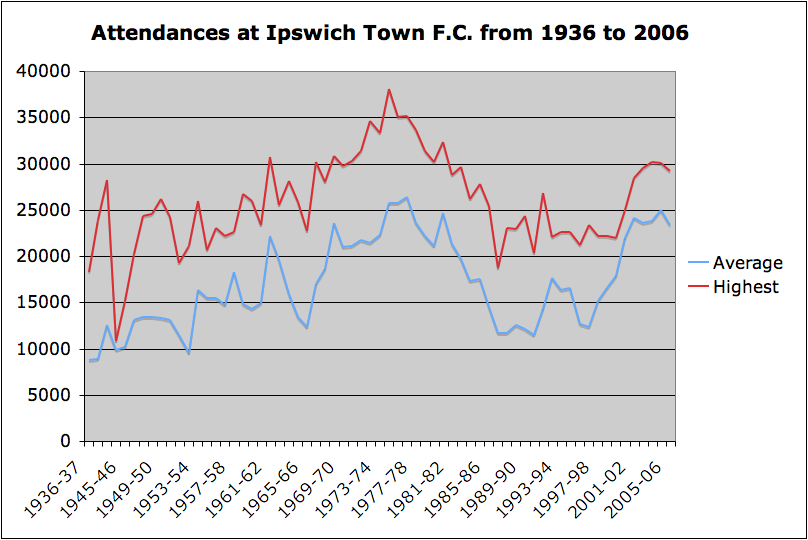
Average and peak attendances from 1936

A recent nickname for Town is "The Tractor Boys", which was first used during the club's brief period in the Premier League from 2000 to 2002, when the team regularly competed against more fashionable clubs from larger, more cosmopolitan cities. The nickname is an example of self-deprecating humour referring to Suffolk's primarily rural and agricultural heritage. The origins of the nickname are not certain, but the first generally accepted use of the nickname was created whilst playing at Leeds United in September 2000: Ipswich were winning the game 2–1 and the Leeds fans started chanting, "We're being beaten by a bunch of tractor drivers". Barracking by supporters of more established Premiership clubs during Town's spell in the Premiership lent the ironic chant "1–0 to the Tractor Boys" increased potency and publicity, and the nickname is commonly used by the media. Former Town manager Jim Magilton commented in the local press that he disliked the nickname and said that it conjured up "images of carrot-crunching yokels", while players such as Matt Holland accepted the chant with good humour.

Ipswich have a global fan base, with the official Ipswich Town Supporters Club having supporters branches across the world. The club has a particularly strong affiliation with German club Fortuna Düsseldorf, with Fortuna fans making an annual visit to Portman Road since 2006. Ipswich fans also organise visits to the Merkur Spiel-Arena in Düsseldorf to support Fortuna at their home matches. The two clubs organised two pre-season friendlies in Düsseldorf in 2015 and in Ipswich in 2024.

=== Rivalries ===
The club's main rivals are Norwich City. When the two teams meet it is known as the East Anglian derby, or, informally, as the "Old Farm derby", a comic reference to the "Old Firm" derby played between Scottish teams Celtic and Rangers and the prominence of agriculture in East Anglia. The series began in the early 20th century, when both clubs were amateur organisations. The first derby was held between the two clubs on 15 November 1902, with the first derby between the two professional clubs taking place in 1939. Locally, much is made of the informal title "Pride of Anglia". Fans claim the title for either winning the East Anglian Derby, finishing highest in the league, having the better current league position and having the more successful club history.

== Records and statistics ==
League positions since 1938–39 season

Mick Mills holds the record for Ipswich league appearances, having played 741 first-team matches between 1966 and 1982. The club's top league goalscorer is Ray Crawford, who scored 203 goals between 1958 and 1969, while Ted Phillips holds the record for the most league goals scored in a season, 41 in the 1956–57 season in Third Division South. Allan Hunter won the most international caps whilst a player at the club, making 47 appearances for Northern Ireland during his time at Ipswich.

The club's widest victory margins in the league have been their 7–0 wins against Portsmouth in the Second Division in 1964, against Southampton in the First Division in 1974 and against West Bromwich Albion in the First Division in 1976. Their heaviest defeats in the league were 10–1 against Fulham in 1963 and 9–0 against Manchester United in 1995.

Ipswich's record home attendance is 38,010 for a sixth round FA Cup match against Leeds United on 8 March 1975. With the introduction of regulations enforcing all-seater stadiums, it is unlikely that this record will be beaten in the foreseeable future.

The highest transfer fee received for an Ipswich player is £37.5 million from Nottingham Forest for Omari Hutchinson in August 2025, while the most spent by the club on a player was £26.1 million for Julio Enciso from Strasbourg in August 2026, following the club's promotion to the Premier League.

Bobby Robson is the club's longest serving manager in terms of games managed, managing Ipswich for 709 matches between 1969 and 1982. Scott Duncan is the club's longest serving manager in terms of time spent as manager at the club, managing the club for 6,487 days between 1937 and 1955.

Ipswich still maintain an undefeated home record in European competition with 31 home games unbeaten. This record began in 1962, when the club first qualified for the European Cup. When Manchester United had their unbeaten 56 match home run ended in 1996 Ipswich had the longest ongoing undefeated home streak in Europe. Due to the team's absence from European competitions in recent years, Dutch club AZ surpassed them in 2007. When AZ lost to Everton a few weeks later and saw their 32 match unbeaten run end, Ipswich took that title again. In the 2014/2015 European season, PSG surpassed Ipswich, briefly taking over the title, but also saw their unbeaten run end.

== Players ==
=== Current squad ===
As of 1 September 2026

Note: Flags indicate national team as defined under FIFA eligibility rules; some limited exceptions apply. Players may hold more than one non-FIFA nationality.

No.	Pos.	Nation	Player
1	GK	ENG	Alex Palmer
2	DF	ENG	Darnell Furlong
3	DF	ENG	Leif Davis
4	DF	CIV	Cédric Kipré
5	MF	NED	Azor Matusiwa
6	DF	MAR	Issa Diop
7	FW	GHA	Abdul Fatawu
8	FW	NOR	Sindre Walle Egeli
9	FW	NED	Zian Flemming
10	FW	PAR	Julio Enciso
11	FW	ENG	Jaden Philogene
12	MF	POR	Florentino Luís
14	MF	IRL	Jack Taylor
19	FW	BRA	Emersonn

No.	Pos.	Nation	Player
20	FW	IRL	Kasey McAteer
23	MF	SRB	Saša Lukić
24	DF	ENG	Jacob Greaves
25	MF	ARG	Exequiel Palacios
26	DF	IRL	Dara O'Shea (captain)
27	GK	ENG	David Button
28	GK	ENG	Christian Walton
29	FW	ENG	Chuba Akpom
32	MF	CHI	Marcelino Núñez
33	FW	ALB	Anis Mehmeti
37	GK	NED	Kjell Scherpen
38	FW	JPN	Daizen Maeda
42	DF	CIV	Abdoul Ouattara
47	FW	ENG	Jack Clarke

Club sponsor and minority stakeholder Ed Sheeran is honourably issued squad number 17.

==== Out on loan ====
Note: Flags indicate national team as defined under FIFA eligibility rules; some limited exceptions apply. Players may hold more than one non-FIFA nationality.

No.	Pos.	Nation	Player
16	FW	IRQ	Ali Al-Hamadi (at Sheffield Wednesday until 31 May 2027)
18	DF	ENG	Ben Johnson (at Stoke City until 31 May 2027)
21	MF	IRL	Chiedozie Ogbene (at Lincoln City until 2 January 2027)
30	MF	ENG	Cameron Humphreys (at Huddersfield Town until 31 May 2027)

No.	Pos.	Nation	Player
31	GK	NED	Kayne van Oevelen (at Valencia until 31 May 2027)
—	GK	SCO	Cieran Slicker (at Barnsley until 31 May 2027)
—	FW	IRL	Sammie Szmodics (at Derby County until 31 May 2027)

=== Under-21s and Academy ===
Ipswich currently runs a category one academy. The academy was particularly successful in the 1960s producing some of Town's greatest players including Kevin Beattie, Terry Butcher, John Wark and Mick Mills. The academy was also very successful in the 1990s, producing a number of first-team players including Kieron Dyer, Richard Wright and Titus Bramble. In more recent years, the academy has produced more young players going onto the first-team including Jordan Rhodes, Luke Woolfenden, Flynn Downes and Andre Dozzell, who like his father Jason Dozzell, scored on his debut at the age of 16.

=== Player of the Year ===
Towards the end of each season, a player is voted as the 'Player of the Year' by the club's fans.

=== Hall of Fame ===
In 2007, the club created a hall of fame into which a number of personnel associated with the club are inducted every year. The inaugural members, Ray Crawford, Mick Mills, Ted Phillips and John Wark, were inducted in 2007 by a ballot of former Ipswich players.

== Club officials ==
=== First-team key staff ===
Position	Name
Manager	(England) Gary O'Neil
Assistant Manager	(England) Tim Jenkins
First-Team Coaches	(Nigeria) Sone Aluko (England) Ed Ames (England) Neil Critchley (England) Stuart Lewis
Goalkeeping Coach	(Republic of Ireland) Rene Gilmartin
Fitness Coach	(England) Jon Ashton
Director of Football Operations	(England) Dmitri Halajko
Director of Performance	(England) Andy Rolls
Head of Analysis	(Republic of Ireland) Cillian Callally
Head of Recruitment	(England) Will Stephenson
Head of Athletic Performance	(England) Matt Allen
Head Physiotherapist	(England) Matt Byard
Head of Strength & Conditioning	(England) Dan Peacock
Sports Scientist	(England) Kit Barnes
Sports Therapist	(England) Alice Grindrod
Kit Manager	(England) Lee Owen
1st Team Logistics	(Scotland) James Tedford

=== Board of directors ===
Position	Name
Chairman	(England) Mark Ashton
Majority-Owner	(United States) ORG
Minority-Owner	(United States) Three Lions Group
Minority-Owner	(England) Ed Sheeran
Minority-Owner	(United States) Udonis Haslem

=== Corporate hierarchy ===
Position	Name
Chief Executive Officer	(England) Mark Ashton
Chief Operating Officer	(England) Luke Werhun
Chief Financial Officer	(England) Tom Ball
Club Secretary	(England) Stuart Hayton

Information correct as of 20 July 2026

== Managers ==
As of 21 November 2026. Only permanent managers are shown.

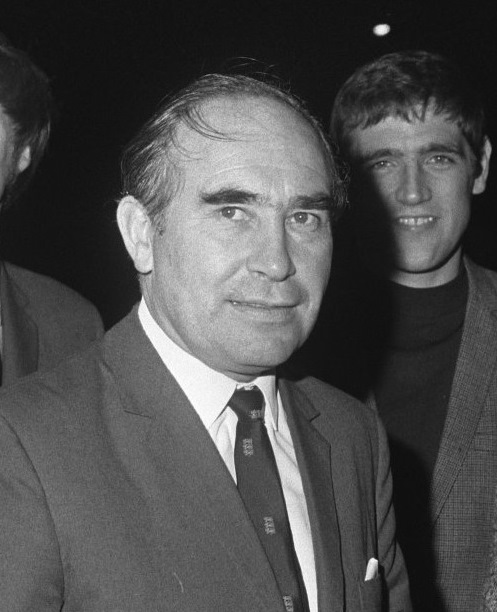
Alf Ramsey managed Ipswich Town between 1955 and 1963, before leading England to win the World Cup in 1966.

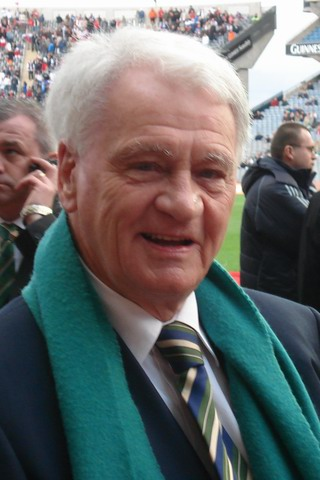
Bobby Robson managed Ipswich Town from 1969 to 1982.

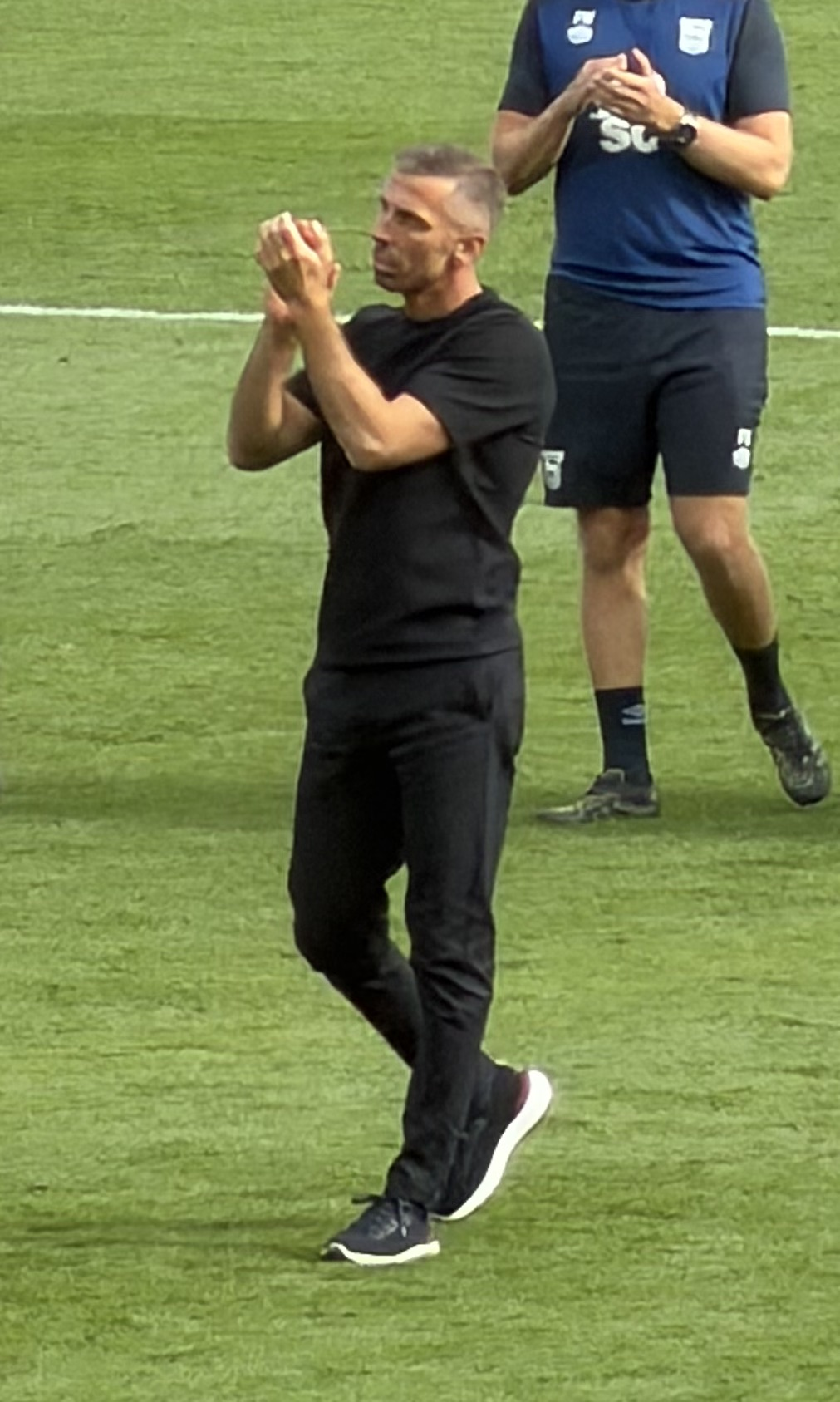
Gary O'Neil, the current manager of Ipswich Town joined in 2026.

Name	Nationality	From	To	M	W	D	L	Win %
Mick O'Brien	Ireland	29 May 1936	11 August 1937	39	25	9	5	64.1
Scott Duncan	Scotland	12 November 1937	7 August 1955	505	205	113	187	40.6
Alf Ramsey	England	8 August 1955	30 April 1963	369	176	75	118	47.7
Jackie Milburn	England	1 May 1963	8 September 1964	56	11	12	33	19.6
Bill McGarry	England	5 October 1964	23 November 1968	196	80	62	54	40.8
Bobby Robson	England	13 January 1969	18 August 1982	709	316	173	220	44.6
Bobby Ferguson	England	19 August 1982	17 May 1987	258	97	61	100	37.6
John Duncan	Scotland	17 June 1987	5 May 1990	161	73	29	59	45.3
John Lyall	England	11 May 1990	5 December 1994	231	77	75	79	33.3
George Burley	Scotland	28 December 1994	11 October 2002	413	188	96	129	45.5
Joe Royle	England	28 October 2002	11 May 2006	189	81	48	60	42.9
Jim Magilton	Northern Ireland	5 June 2006	22 April 2009	148	56	41	51	37.8
Roy Keane	Ireland	23 April 2009	7 January 2011	81	28	25	28	34.6
Paul Jewell	England	13 January 2011	24 October 2012	86	30	18	38	34.9
Mick McCarthy	Ireland	1 November 2012	10 April 2018	279	105	78	96	37.6
Paul Hurst	England	30 May 2018	25 October 2018	15	1	7	7	6.7
Paul Lambert	Scotland	27 October 2018	28 February 2021	113	37	28	48	32.7
Paul Cook	England	2 March 2021	4 December 2021	44	13	17	14	29.5
Kieran McKenna	Northern Ireland	20 December 2021	10 June 2026	222	105	63	54	47.3
Gary O'Neil	England	23 June 2026	present	13	4	2	7	30.8

== Honours ==
=== League ===
- First Division/Premier League (Tier 1)
  - Champions: 1961–62
  - Runners-up: 1980–81, 1981–82
- Second Division/First Division/Championship (Tier 2)
  - Champions: 1960–61, 1967–68, 1991–92
  - Runners-up: 2023–24, 2025–26
  - Play-off winners: 2000
- Third Division/Second Division/League One (Tier 3)
  - Champions: 1953–54, 1956–57
  - Runners-up: 2022–23
- Southern League
  - Champions: 1936–37

=== Cup ===
==== Domestic ====
- FA Cup
  - Winners: 1977–78
- Texaco Cup
  - Winners: 1972–73

==== Continental ====
- UEFA Cup
  - Winners: 1980–81

== Ipswich Town in popular culture ==
A number of Ipswich players appeared alongside Sylvester Stallone and Pelé in the 1981 prisoner of war film Escape to Victory, including John Wark, Russell Osman, Robin Turner, Laurie Sivell, and Kevin O'Callaghan. Other Ipswich Town players stood in for actors in the football scenes—Kevin Beattie for Michael Caine, and Paul Cooper for Sylvester Stallone.

== Ipswich Town Football Club Women ==
A women's team affiliated with the club, Ipswich Town Women currently compete in the Women's Super League 2, the second tier of women's English football, following promotion from the FAWNL South Division as champions in the 2024–25 season. The team also has an academy playing in the U21 Premier League with England recognition. The team play their home games at Colchester Community Stadium in Colchester, the home of Colchester United, as well as playing the occasional game at Portman Road.
