= Pride of Anglia =

Unofficial football club title

Various English association football clubs located in the television broadcast area of East Anglia (see ITV Anglia) (this would include Norfolk, Suffolk and Cambridgeshire core that the region is named after, along with the counties of Essex, Bedfordshire and Northamptonshire who are not geographically in East Anglia) vie for being the Pride of Anglia, an unofficial title celebrated by fans of the clubs involved. These clubs include Cambridge United, Colchester United, Ipswich Town, Norwich City and Peterborough United.

The two most widely-regarded methods for deciding the accolade, most recent league position, and most recent result in the East Anglian derby, respectively.

== Description ==
Colchester Chief Executive, Marie Partner with "Pride of Anglia" trophy, awarded by Anglia Television in 2007. This the only time (on record) a reward has been bestowed on a club for achieving "Pride of Anglia" status

Professional association football teams from the ceremonial counties that make up East Anglia (i.e. the counties of Norfolk, Suffolk, Essex and Cambridgeshire in England) compete for this unofficial title. No actual official trophy or reward is awarded.

Winning the most recent East Anglian derby and finishing as the highest Anglian team in the league pyramid are the two main measures employed by fans/pundits etc. that decide who can claim this title. The main two football clubs vying for the title are Ipswich Town from Suffolk and Norwich City from Norfolk. Both teams currently regularly compete in the top two tiers in the English football league and often find themselves in the same division, meaning at least two derby matches will be played during the season as league games, in addition to any cup / play-off games where the two teams may be drawn against each other.

Other league clubs from the region include Colchester United, Peterborough United and Cambridge United. These teams occasionally find themselves in the same league as Norwich and Ipswich and thus have the opportunity to claim the title for finishing highest in the league. In 2007, Colchester United finished in the highest league position in East Anglia and the club were (uniquely) awarded a special trophy by Anglia Television to mark the occasion. As Essex falls into the ITV Anglia sphere this is why the team received the award even though geographically Essex isn't part of geographic East Anglia but just television broadcast area of "Anglia"

== East Anglian derby ==
When Norwich and Ipswich meet, the match is known as the 'East Anglian derby', first played in 1902. The most recent encounter played on 11 April 2026 at Carrow Road ended in a 2–0 victory to Ipswich. This win saw Norwich lose their 20 year home unbeaten streak and saw Ipswich do the double for the first time since 1992/93.

In recent years, the fixture has sometimes been humorously called the 'Old Farm derby', a reference to the Old Firm derby played between rival Glasgow clubs Celtic and Rangers, and to the prominence of agriculture in East Anglia. The derby has been described as one of the best derbies in the UK.

== League position ==
League positions for the five professional association football clubs in East Anglia

Another commonly employed measure for "Pride of Anglia", and one that encompasses all of the East Anglian teams, is the team finishing as the highest-placed East Anglian team in the English football league system.

In the 2023–24 season, Ipswich finished in the highest league position of all East Anglian clubs for the first time in some years. and will by default be the best in Anglia on league position until at least the end of the 2024–2025 season for being the only club from the region in the highest tier of English football. Ipswich Town defeated Norwich City in their most recent encounter in the 2025–2026 season, meaning they can now lay full claim to the Pride of Anglia title after a 15 year win hiatus.

== See also ==
- East Anglian derby
