= Laurie Sivell =

English footballer

Personal information
- Full name: Laurence Sivell
- Date of birth: 6 February 1951 (age 75)
- Place of birth: Lowestoft, England
- Height: 5 ft 8 in (1.73 m)
- Position: Goalkeeper

Senior career*
Years	Team	Apps	(Gls)
1969–1984	Ipswich Town	141	(0)
1979	→ Lincoln City (loan)	2	(0)
Total		143	(0)
- * Club domestic league appearances and goals

Laurence Sivell (born 6 February 1951 in Lowestoft) is an English former footballer who played in the Football League as a goalkeeper for Ipswich Town and Lincoln City.

Sivell spent 15 years with Ipswich Town, between 1969 and 1984. He made 141 league appearances for the East Anglian club during that time, despite primarily being the understudy to goalkeepers including David Best and Paul Cooper. He also played two games on loan to Lincoln City in the 1978–79 season. Sivell was noted for his bravery, typically diving at the feet of oncoming strikers to snatch the ball, and had considerable athletic ability to offset his diminutive size (for a goalkeeper). Sivell contributed to Ipswich's victorious 1980-81 UEFA Cup campaign, making one appearance during the run. However he wasn't part of the squad for the final itself.

Together with several Ipswich teammates, Sivell took part in the 1981 film Escape to Victory, known as just Victory in North America. He played the German goalkeeper.

Year	Title	Role	Notes
1981	Escape to Victory	Schmidt - Goalie - The Germans	

After retiring from football Sivell became a fishmonger.

== Honours ==
Ipswich Town

- Texaco Cup: 1973
- FA Cup: 1978
- UEFA Cup: 1981

Individual

- Ipswich Town Hall of Fame: Inducted 2018
