= Ferenc Fülöp =

Hungarian association football player

Personal information
- Full name: Ferenc Fülöp
- Date of birth: 22 February 1955 (age 71)
- Place of birth: Hungary

Ferenc Fülöp (born 22 February 1955 in Budapest) is a Hungarian football administrator with MTK Hungária FC. He played as a midfielder.

Between 1977 – 1986 he was a footballer of the MTK Hungária FC, then was contracted by the Belgian Olympic Charleroi where he spent 3 years. Fülöp was an unused member of the Hungary 1978 World Cup squad in Argentina.

Ferenc Fülöp played a role in the 1981 film Escape to Victory as a centre forward for the Nazi team in a match against a PoW team.

- Escape to Victory (1981) – German Team Player (uncredited)

In 1993, he returned to Hungary, and he acted as the technical manager of the Hungary national football team. From 1995 to 2006 he was the technical director of his former club, the MTK. In 2000, he was chosen by the Hungarian sport reporters the manager of the year. Beginning from March 2006 he is working at the Stars & Friends agency, intermediating international contracts for the Hungarian football players.

His late son, Márton Fülöp was also a footballer.
