= Søren Lindsted =

Danish footballer

Søren Lindsted (born 2 February 1957) is a Danish former footballer who played as a striker. He started his career as a semi-professional with Holbæk Boldklub, reaching the 1976 Danish Cup final and was the team's top goalscorer in 1977 and 1978. He then signed a professional contract with FC Twente in the Netherlands, playing there from 1979 to 1982. He also played for Belgian teams KFC Winterslag and RFC de Liège, before returning to Holbæk in 1985. He played a single season with KB, before ending his career with Holbæk in 1990.

In 1981, he was also involved in a large-scale movie project, Escape to Victory. In the movie, he played a Danish football player and POW during World War II named Eric Ball. The movie shows him being forced to play a propaganda football match against a selected Nazi German football team in occupied France along with other prisoners from a German POW camp.

Year	Title	Role	Notes
1981	Escape to Victory	Erik Ball - Allied Soccer Player - The Players: Denmark	
