= 1960–61 Ipswich Town F.C. season =

Ipswich Town
1960–61 season
- Chairman: John Cobbold
- Manager: Alf Ramsey
- Stadium: Portman Road
- Football League Second Division: 1st
- FA Cup: Third round
- League Cup: First round
- Top goalscorer: League: Ray Crawford (40); All: Ray Crawford (40)
- Highest home attendance: 23,321 vs Norwich City (Division Two, 27 December 1960)
- Lowest home attendance: 9,803 v Leyton Orient (Division Two, 17 December 1960)
- Average home league attendance: 15,095
Home colours

The 1960–61 season was the 72nd season of competitive football played by Ipswich Town. They finished the season as champions of the Second Division, one point ahead of second-placed Sheffield United, winning promotion to the top flight of English football for the first time in their history. Ray Crawford was the league's top scorer with 40 goals and his strike partner Ted Phillips netted 30 times as Ipswich scored exactly 100 league goals.

== Squad ==
Note: Flags indicate national team as defined under FIFA eligibility rules; some limited exceptions apply. Players may hold more than one non-FIFA nationality.

Pos.	Nation	Player
GK	ENG	Roy Bailey
GK	ENG	Wilf Hall
DF	SCO	Billy Baxter
DF	ENG	Larry Carberry
DF	ENG	John Compton
DF	ENG	John Laurel
DF	SCO	Ken Malcolm
DF	ENG	Andy Nelson
MF	WAL	John Elsworthy

Pos.	Nation	Player
MF	SCO	Jimmy Leadbetter
MF	WAL	Aled Owen
MF	ENG	Reg Pickett
MF	ENG	Roy Stephenson
FW	ENG	Ray Crawford
FW	IRL	Dermot Curtis
FW	ENG	Doug Millward
FW	ENG	Ted Phillips
FW	WAL	Derek Rees
FW	ENG	Brian Siddall

== League standings ==
Pos	Team	Pld	W	D	L	GF	GA	GAv	Pts	Qualification or relegation
1	Ipswich Town (C, P)	42	26	7	9	100	55	1.818	59	Promotion to the First Division
2	Sheffield United (P)	42	26	6	10	81	51	1.588	58	Promotion to the First Division
3	Liverpool	42	21	10	11	87	58	1.500	52	
4	Norwich City	42	20	9	13	70	53	1.321	49	
5	Middlesbrough	42	18	12	12	83	74	1.122	48	

Rules for classification: 1) Points; 2) Goal average; 3) Goals scored
(C) Champions; (P) Promoted

== Results ==
Home team listed first

=== Division Two ===
20 August 1960 1	Leyton Orient	1–3	Ipswich Town	London
	Johnston 52'		Rees 25' 37'; Crawford 89'	Stadium: Brisbane Road; Attendance: 14,798

25 August 1960 2	Scunthorpe United	4–0	Ipswich Town	Scunthorpe
	Marriott 17'; Godfrey; Neale; Thomas			Stadium: Old Showground; Attendance: 11,130

27 August 1960 3	Ipswich Town	4–1	Derby County	Ipswich
	Owen 31'; Crawford 63'; Rees 71'; Elsworthy 78'		Parry 29'	Stadium: Portman Road; Attendance: 12,309

30 August 1960 4	Ipswich Town	2–0	Scunthorpe United	Ipswich
	Crawford 6' 79'			Stadium: Portman Road; Attendance: 12,426

3 September 1960 5	Bristol Rovers	1–1	Ipswich Town	Bristol
	Biggs 44'		Phillips (pen) 8'	Stadium: Eastville; Attendance: 15,467

7 September 1960 6	Brighton & Hove Albion	2–4	Ipswich Town	Hove
	Laverick 4'; Tiddy (pen) 30'		Crawford 3' 25' 86'; Phillips 11'	Stadium: Goldstone Ground; Attendance: 12,595

10 September 1960 7	Ipswich Town	1–0	Liverpool	Ipswich
	Phillips 34'			Stadium: Portman Road; Attendance: 13,521

13 September 1960 8	Ipswich Town	4–0	Brighton & Hove Albion	Ipswich
	Crawford; Phillips 10' 36'			Stadium: Portman Road; Attendance: 14,672

17 September 1960 9	Rotherham United	1–1	Ipswich Town	Rotherham
	O'Hara 26'		Phillips 79'	Stadium: Millmoor; Attendance: 8873

24 September 1960 10	Ipswich Town	3–3	Southampton	Ipswich
	Stephenson 12'; Phillips 57' 85'		Paine 52' 60'; Mulgrew 82'	Stadium: Portman Road; Attendance: 15,318

1 October 1960 11	Leeds United	2–5	Ipswich Town	Leeds
	McCole 7' 40'		Crawford 15' 52' 65'; Stephenson 48'; Phillips 72'	Stadium: Elland Road; Attendance: 13,582

8 October 1960 12	Charlton Athletic	0–2	Ipswich Town	London
			Phillips 1'; Millward 27'	Stadium: The Valley; Attendance: 12,671

15 October 1960 13	Ipswich Town	0–1	Sheffield United	Ipswich
			Russell 4'	Stadium: Portman Road; Attendance: 19,529

22 October 1960 14	Stoke City	2–4	Ipswich Town	Stoke-on-Trent
	Bentley 6'; D. Ward 22'		Crawford 39' 52'; Phillips 55'; Millward 85'	Stadium: Victoria Ground; Attendance: 8052

29 October 1960 15	Ipswich Town	0–3	Swansea Town	Ipswich
			Carberry 28' (o.g.); H. Williams 34'; G. Williams 58'	Stadium: Portman Road; Attendance: 11,178

5 November 1960 16	Luton Town	3–2	Ipswich Town	Luton
	Turner 10' 90'; Ashworth 46'		Crawford 30' 87'	Stadium: Kenilworth Road; Attendance: 11,221

12 November 1960 17	Ipswich Town	3–1	Lincoln City	Ipswich
	Phillips 53'; Millward 55'; Crawford 73'		Graver 89'	Stadium: Portman Road; Attendance: 10,197

19 November 1960 18	Portsmouth	1–0	Ipswich Town	Portsmouth
	Chapman 70'			Stadium: Fratton Park; Attendance: 11,482

26 November 1960 19	Ipswich Town	4–2	Huddersfield Town	Ipswich
	Phillips (pen) 21'; Millward 41'; Crawford 72'; Stephenson 82'		Stokes 10'; Low 89'	Stadium: Portman Road; Attendance: 11,056

3 December 1960 20	Sunderland	2–0	Ipswich Town	Sunderland
	McPheat 54' 60'			Stadium: Roker Park; Attendance: 21,251

10 December 1960 21	Ipswich Town	3–1	Plymouth Argyle	Ipswich
	Crawford 54' 71'; Phillips 81'		Kirby 36'	Stadium: Portman Road; Attendance: 11,798

17 December 1960 22	Ipswich Town	6–2	Leyton Orient	Ipswich
	Crawford 6' 62' 80'; Owen 27' (o.g.); Leadbetter 71'; Phillips 89'		Johnston 53'; McDonald 68'	Stadium: Portman Road; Attendance: 9803

26 December 1960 23	Norwich City	0–3	Ipswich Town	Norwich
			Crawford 22' 70'; Phillips 37'	Stadium: Carrow Road; Attendance: 30,884

27 December 1960 24	Ipswich Town	4–1	Norwich City	Ipswich
	Phillips (pen) 27'; Crawford 39' 72'; Millward 85'		Hill 18'	Stadium: Portman Road; Attendance: 23,321

14 January 1961 25	Ipswich Town	3–2	Bristol Rovers	Ipswich
	Millward 11'; Stephenson 32' 53'		Biggs 13' 49'	Stadium: Portman Road; Attendance: 11,946

21 January 1961 26	Liverpool	1–1	Ipswich Town	Liverpool
	Lewis 73'		Phillips 42'	Stadium: Anfield; Attendance: 33,401

4 February 1961 27	Ipswich Town	1–1	Rotherham United	Ipswich
	Crawford 21'		Sawyer 9'	Stadium: Portman Road; Attendance: 12,225

11 February 1961 28	Southampton	1–1	Ipswich Town	Southampton
	O'Brien (pen) 44'		Stephenson 64'	Stadium: The Dell; Attendance: 19,946

18 February 1961 29	Ipswich Town	4–0	Leeds United	Ipswich
	Crawford 16'; Phillips 36' 43'; Rees 54'			Stadium: Portman Road; Attendance: 13,125

25 February 1961 30	Ipswich Town	2–1	Charlton Athletic	Ipswich
	Crawford 23' 63'		Summers 26'	Stadium: Portman Road; Attendance: 14,365

7 March 1961 31	Sheffield United	1–3	Ipswich Town	Sheffield
	Simpson 56'		Phillips 32'; Crawford 51' 66'	Stadium: Bramall Lane; Attendance: 35,057

11 March 1961 32	Ipswich Town	2–1	Stoke City	Ipswich
	Phillips 12'; Elsworthy 90'		King 66'	Stadium: Portman Road; Attendance: 16,578

18 March 1961 33	Plymouth Argyle	1–2	Ipswich Town	Torquay
	Carter 22'		Phillips 20'; Crawford 85'	Stadium: Plainmoor; Attendance: 9879

25 March 1961 34	Ipswich Town	0–1	Luton Town	Ipswich
			McGuffie 19'	Stadium: Portman Road; Attendance: 21,744

31 March 1961 35	Ipswich Town	3–1	Middlesbrough	Ipswich
	Leadbetter 4'; Crawford 16' 83'		Peacock 24'	Stadium: Portman Road; Attendance: 22,239

1 April 1961 36	Huddersfield Town	1–3	Ipswich Town	Huddersfield
	McHale 88'		Phillips 17' 55'; Crawford 70'	Stadium: Leeds Road; Attendance: 16,459

3 April 1961 37	Middlesbrough	3–1	Ipswich Town	Middlesbrough
	Yeoman 24'; Harris (pen) 88'; Clough 89'		Phillips 85'	Stadium: Ayresome Park; Attendance: 12,996

8 April 1961 38	Ipswich Town	2–2	Portsmouth	Ipswich
	Phillips (pen) 2'; Curtis 25'		Cutler 1'; Howells 27'	Stadium: Portman Road; Attendance: 18,538

15 April 1961 39	Lincoln City	1–4	Ipswich Town	Lincoln
	Nelson 17' (o.g.)		Crawford 50'; Leadbetter 52'; Phillips 78'; Stephenson 86'	Stadium: Sincil Bank; Attendance: 7820

22 April 1961 40	Ipswich Town	4–0	Sunderland	Ipswich
	Elsworthy 4'; Crawford 38'; Curtis 48'; Phillips (pen) 80'			Stadium: Portman Road; Attendance: 21,115

24 April 1961 41	Derby County	1–4	Ipswich Town	Derby
	Hutchinson 6'		Stephenson 69' 81'; Crawford 86'; Curtis 87'	Stadium: Baseball Ground; Attendance: 13,121

29 April 1961 42	Swansea Town	2–1	Ipswich Town	Swansea
	Nurse 7'; Reynolds 88'		Phillips 50'	Stadium: Vetch Field; Attendance: 18,239

=== League Cup ===
11 October 1960 1	Ipswich Town	0–2	Barnsley	Ipswich
			Beaumont; Bartlett	Stadium: Portman Road; Attendance: 11,189

=== FA Cup ===
7 January 1961 3	Southampton	7–1	Ipswich Town	Southampton
	O'Brien 7' 26' (pen) 29'; Mulgrew 22' 78'; Penk 30'; Paine 39'		Page 47' (o.g.)	Stadium: The Dell; Attendance: 20,422

== Statistics ==
=== Squad Statistics ===
Players who made one appearance or more for Ipswich Town F.C. during the 1960–61 season

No.	Pos	Nat	Player	Total		Football League Division Two		Football League Cup		FA Cup	
No.	Pos	Nat	Player	Apps	Goals	Apps	Goals	Apps	Goals	Apps	Goals
	GK	(England) ENG	Roy Bailey	40	0	38	0	1	0	1	0
	DF	(England) ENG	Larry Carberry	44	0	42	0	1	0	1	0
	DF	(Scotland) SCO	Ken Malcolm	43	0	41	0	1	0	1	0
	DF	(England) ENG	Andy Nelson	40	0	39	0	0	0	1	0
	MF	(Wales) WAL	John Elsworthy	41	3	39	3	1	0	1	0
	MF	(Scotland) SCO	Jimmy Leadbetter	44	3	42	3	1	0	1	0
	MF	(England) ENG	Reg Pickett	26	0	24	0	1	0	1	0
	MF	(England) ENG	Roy Stephenson	34	9	33	9	0	0	1	0
	FW	(England) ENG	Ray Crawford	44	40	42	40	1	0	1	0
	FW	(England) ENG	Ted Phillips	44	30	42	30	1	0	1	0
	FW	(England) ENG	Doug Millward	21	6	19	6	1	0	1	0
	GK	(England) ENG	Wilf Hall	4	0	4	0	0	0	0	0
	DF	(Scotland) SCO	Billy Baxter	19	0	19	0	0	0	0	0
	FW	(Wales) WAL	Derek Rees	16	4	16	4	0	0	0	0
	MF	(Wales) WAL	Aled Owen	8	1	8	1	0	0	0	0
	FW	(Republic of Ireland) IRL	Dermot Curtis	5	3	5	3	0	0	0	0
	DF	(England) ENG	John Compton	3	0	3	0	0	0	0	0
	DF	(England) ENG	John Laurel	4	0	3	0	1	0	0	0
	FW	(England) ENG	Brian Siddall	4	0	3	0	1	0	0	0

- Source: http://www.prideofanglia.com/page.php?page=seasons&text=1960-61&level=1 Pride of Anglia – Ipswich Town Football Club Season 1960–61
