= Ipswich Town F.C. Hall of Fame =

Hall of Fame of Ipswich Town Football Club

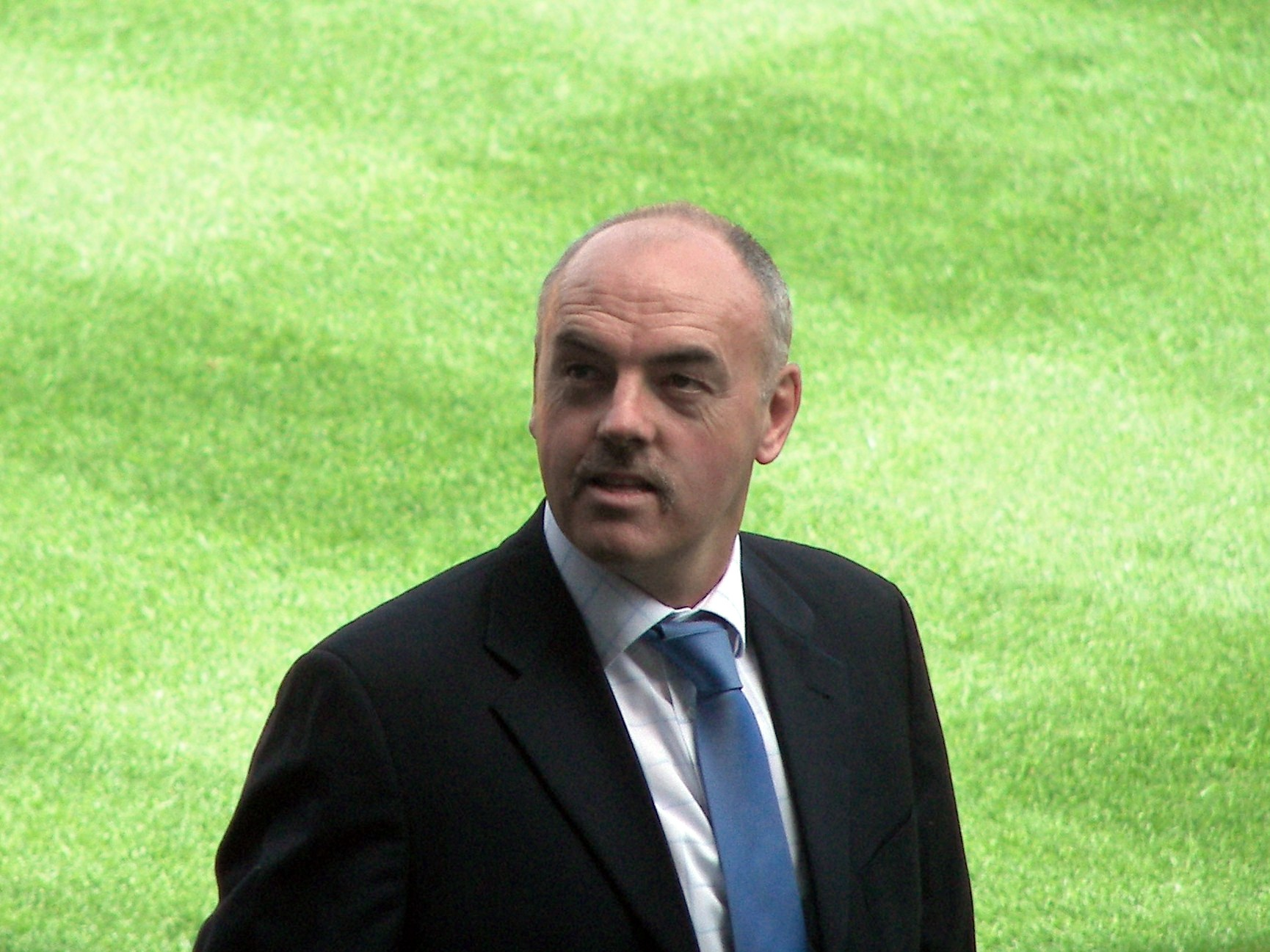
John Wark, one of the four inaugural members of the Ipswich Town F.C. Hall of Fame.

Ipswich Town Football Club is an English association football club founded in 1878. In 2007, the club created a hall of fame into which a number of personnel associated with the club are inducted every year. The inaugural members, Ray Crawford, Mick Mills, Ted Phillips and John Wark, were selected in 2007 by a ballot of former Ipswich players. There were no inductees for the 2020 or 2021 seasons due to the COVID-19 pandemic.

As of 2026, five of the Hall of Fame's inductees are club record holders. England international Crawford remains Ipswich Town's all-time top scorer, with 203 goals between 1958 and 1969. Allan Hunter, inducted in 2009, is the most internationally capped player while at Ipswich, having played for Northern Ireland 47 times while at the club. England international Mills is the club's all-time appearance record-holder having played 741 competitive matches. Phillips is the club's all-time season top-scorer, scoring 46 goals in the 1956–57 season when Ipswich played in the Football League Third Division South.

John Elsworthy (inducted 2008) is the earliest player to represent Ipswich to be inducted into the Hall of the Fame, having played for the club from 1949 to 1964, while Darren Bent (inducted 2026) is the most recent representative of the club to be inducted. The inductees include 11 posthumous members, amongst them managers Alf Ramsey who led the club to back-to-back division titles in the 1960–61 and 1961–62 seasons before going on to manage England to victory in the 1966 FIFA World Cup, and John Lyall who took Ipswich into the inaugural Premier League in 1992.

== Members ==
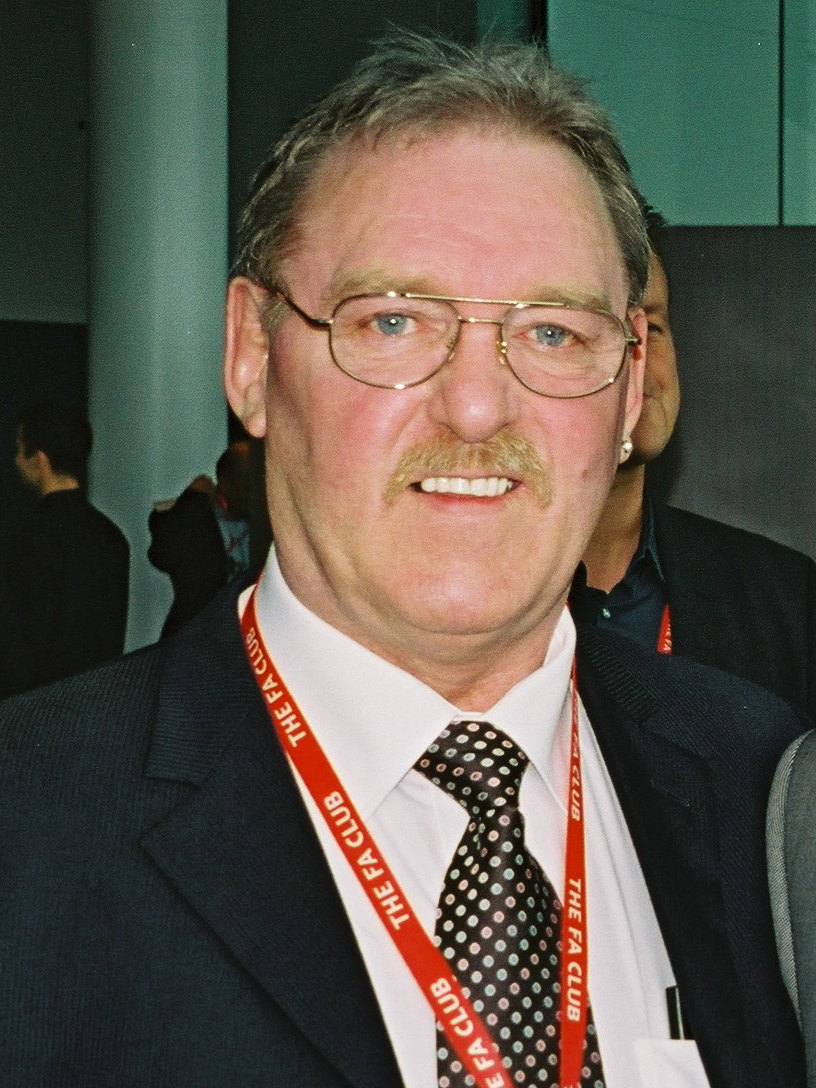
Kevin Beattie was inducted into the Hall of Fame in 2008.

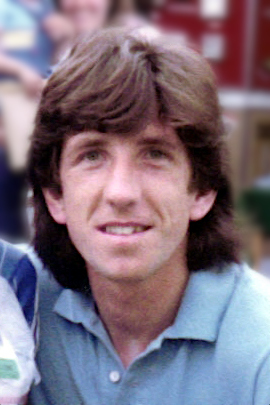
England international Paul Mariner was inducted in 2011.

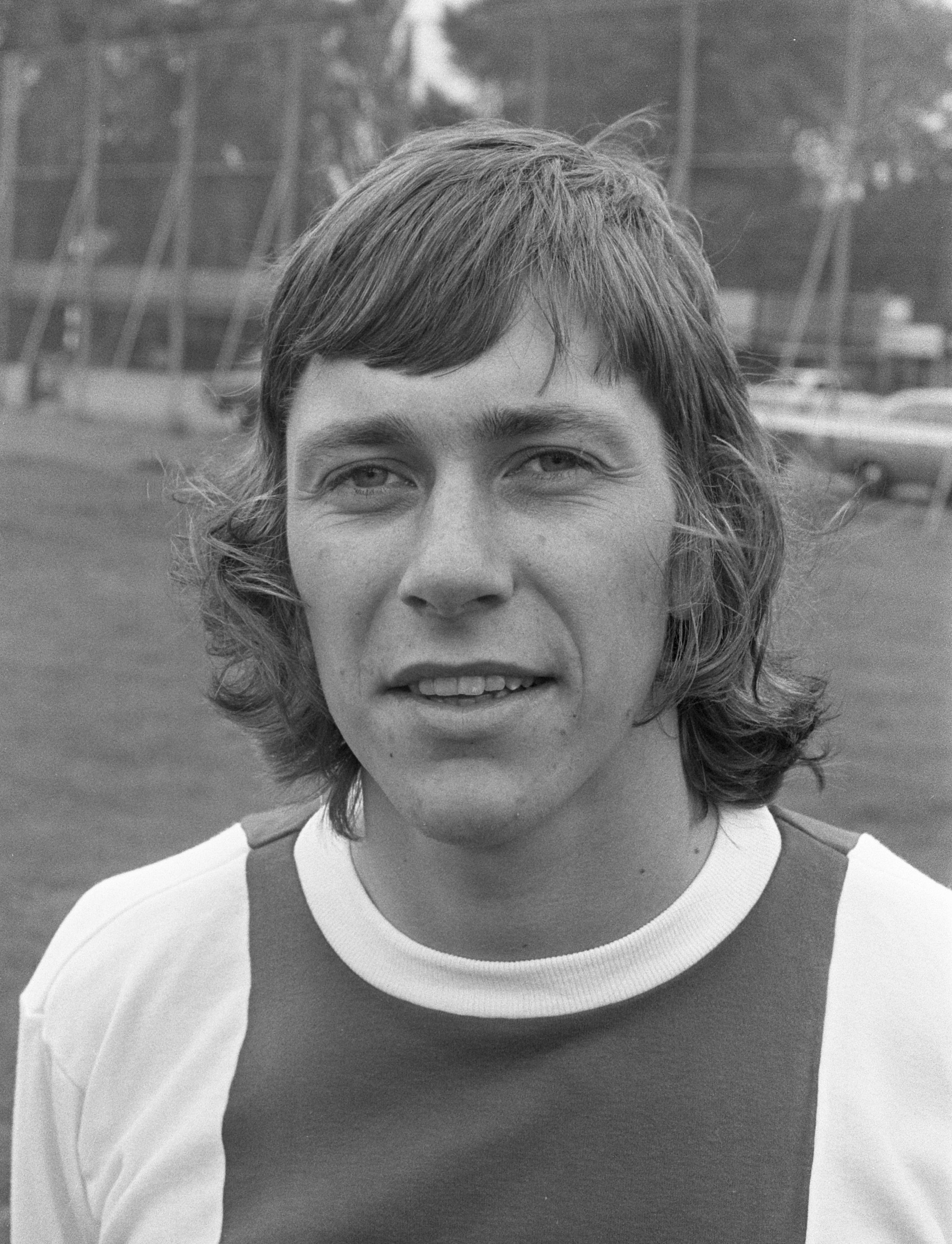
Dutch midfielder Arnold Mühren was inducted in 2009.

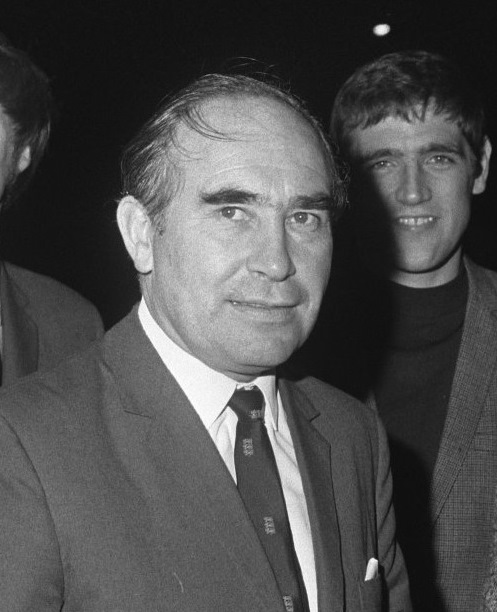
Alf Ramsey managed Ipswich between 1955 and 1963 before leading England to win the World Cup; he was posthumously inducted in 2011.

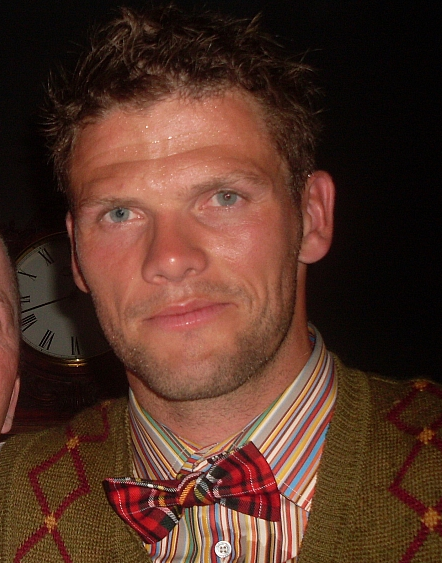
Icelandic defender Hermann Hreiðarsson was inducted in 2019.

	Players who represented their country while at the club
‡	Club record holder
†	Posthumous induction

Members of the Ipswich Town F.C. Hall of Fame
Name	Nationality	Position or role at club	Year of induction	Years at ITFC	Appearances	Goals	Notes
Basil Acres †	(England)	Full back	2012	1951–1959	231	6	
Roy Bailey †	(England)	Goalkeeper	2011	1955–1964	346	0	
Billy Baxter	(Scotland)	Centre half	2009	1960–1971	459	22	(Note: Led the team to win the Second Division in the 1967–68 season)
Kevin Beattie	(England)	Central defender	2008	1972–1981	307	32	
Darren Bent	(England)	Forward	2026	2001–2005	142	55	
Alan Brazil	(Scotland)	Forward	2013	1977–1982	210	80	
Frank Brogan †	(Scotland)	Winger	2025	1964–1970	223	69	
George Burley	(Scotland)	Right full back/ Manager	2009	1973–1985; 1994–2002	500	11	
Terry Butcher	(England)	Central defender	2010	1977–1985	351	21	
Larry Carberry	(England)	Right full back	2010	1956–1964	283	0	
John Cobbold	(England)	Chairman	2010	1948–1983	–	–	Merit award
John Compton	(England)	Defender	2011	1960–1963	131	0	
Paul Cooper	(England)	Goalkeeper	2014	1974–1987	575	0	
Ray Crawford	(England)	Forward	2007	1958–1969	353	227	(Note: All-time top scorer)‡
Jason Dozzell	(England)	Forward	2015	1983–1992; 1997	416	73	
John Elsworthy	(Wales)	Wing half	2008	1949–1964	434	52	
Bobby Ferguson	(England)	Manager	2015	1982–1987	–	–	Merit award
Jimmy Forsyth	(Scotland)	Coach/ Caretaker manager	2012	1964	–	–	Merit award
Eric Gates	(England)	Forward	2012	1973–1984	384	96	
Pat Godbold	(England)	Secretary/ Archivist	2009	1954–2024	–	–	Merit award
Bryan Hamilton	(Northern Ireland)	Midfielder	2014	1971–1976	199	56	
Colin Harper	(England)	Defender	2016	1965–1974	180	6	
Danny Hegan †	(Northern Ireland)	Midfielder	2016	1963–1968	230	38	
Matt Holland	(Republic of Ireland)	Midfielder	2014	1997–2003	314	45	
Hermann Hreiðarsson	(Iceland)	Defender	2019	2000–2003	128	3	
Allan Hunter	(Northern Ireland)	Central defender	2009	1971–1982	355	10	(Note: Club's most capped player with 47 appearances for Northern Ireland)‡
David Johnson	(England)	Forward	2016	1972–1975	178	46	
David Johnson	(Jamaica)	Forward	2025	1997–2001	158	62	
Gavin Johnson	(England)	Left back	2022	1989–1995	131	10	
John Kerr	(England)	Chairman	2013	1983–1995	–	–	Merit award
Chris Kiwomya	(England)	Forward	2017	1988–1994	261	64	
Mick Lambert	(England)	Winger	2015	1968–1978	263	45	
Cyril Lea	(Wales)	Wing half	2010	1964–1968	123	2	
Jimmy Leadbetter	(Scotland)	Winger	2008	1955–1965	373	49	
David Linighan	(England)	Center back	2022	1988–1995	277	12	
John Lyall †	(England)	Manager	2014	1990–1994	–	–	Merit award
Jim Magilton	(Northern Ireland)	Midfielder/ Manager	2023	1999–2006; 2006–2009	322	22	
Ken Malcolm †	(Scotland)	Defender	2022	1954–1963	274	2	
Paul Mariner	(England)	Centre forward	2011	1976–1983	339	135	
Steve McCall	(England)	Midfielder	2017	1978–1986	331	12	
Mick Mills	(England)	Full back	2007	1966–1982	741	30	(Note: All-time appearance record-holder)‡
Doug Millward †	(England)	Forward	2022	1955–1963	143	35	
Simon Milton	(England)	Midfielder	2016	1987–1997	330	56	
Doug Moran	(Scotland)	Forward	2011	1961–1963	123	37	
Tony Mowbray	(England)	Centre back	2016	1995–2000	158	8	
Arnold Mühren	(Netherlands)	Midfielder	2009	1978–1982	214	29	
Richard Naylor	(England)	Defender	2025	1996–2009	374	40	
Andy Nelson	(England)	Defender	2011	1959–1964	214	0	
Kevin O'Callaghan	(Republic of Ireland)	Left winger	2022	1980–1985	115	3	
Roger Osborne	(England)	Midfielder	2010	1973–1980	148	10	
Russell Osman	(England)	Centre back	2011	1977–1984	385	21	
Peter Over †	(England)	Club Ambassador	2026	2015–2026	–	–	
Tommy Parker	(England)	Wing half	2010	1945–1957	465	92	
Ted Phillips	(England)	Inside forward	2007	1954–1964	294	179	(Note: Most goals in a season (41) in 1956–57 season)‡
Reg Pickett †	(England)	Wing half	2022	1957–1963	140	3	
Alf Ramsey †	(England)	Manager	2011	1955–1963	–	–	Merit award
Dale Roberts †	(England)	Defender/ Assistant Manager	2013	1974–1977; 1995–2003	24	0	
Bobby Robson	(England)	Manager	2009	1969–1982	–	–	Merit award
David Rose	(England)	Club secretary	2017	1958–2003	–	–	Merit award
James Scowcroft	(England)	Forward	2024	1994–2001; 2005	257	55	
David Sheepshanks	(England)	Chairman	2013	1987–2009	–	–	Merit award
Laurie Sivell	(England)	Goalkeeper	2018	1967–1984	175	0	
Roy Stephenson	(England)	Right winger	2009	1960–1964	163	26	
Mick Stockwell	(England)	Midfielder	2013	1982–2000	608	44	
Marcus Stewart	(England)	Forward	2023	2000–2002	96	37	
Brian Talbot	(England)	Midfielder	2013	1973–1978	227	31	
Team of 1961–62	(England)	NA	2011	1961–1962	52	116	Merit award
Frans Thijssen	(Netherlands)	Midfielder	2008	1979–1983	170	16	
Mark Venus	(England)	Defender	2025	1997–2003	184	19	
Jason de Vos	(Canada)	Defender	2019	2004–2008	179	11	
John Wark	(Scotland)	Midfielder	2007	1975–1996	678	179	(Note: PFA Players' Player of the Year in 1981)‡
Trevor Whymark	(England)	Forward	2012	1969–1978	335	104	
Fabian Wilnis	(Netherlands)	Full back	2024	1999–2008	324	6	
Charlie Woods	(England)	Forward	2016	1969–1979	89	7	
Clive Woods	(England)	Winger	2014	1966–1980	339	31	
Frank Yallop	(Canada)	Defender	2023	1984–1996	386	8	
