= Andy King (footballer, born 1988) =

Wales international football player

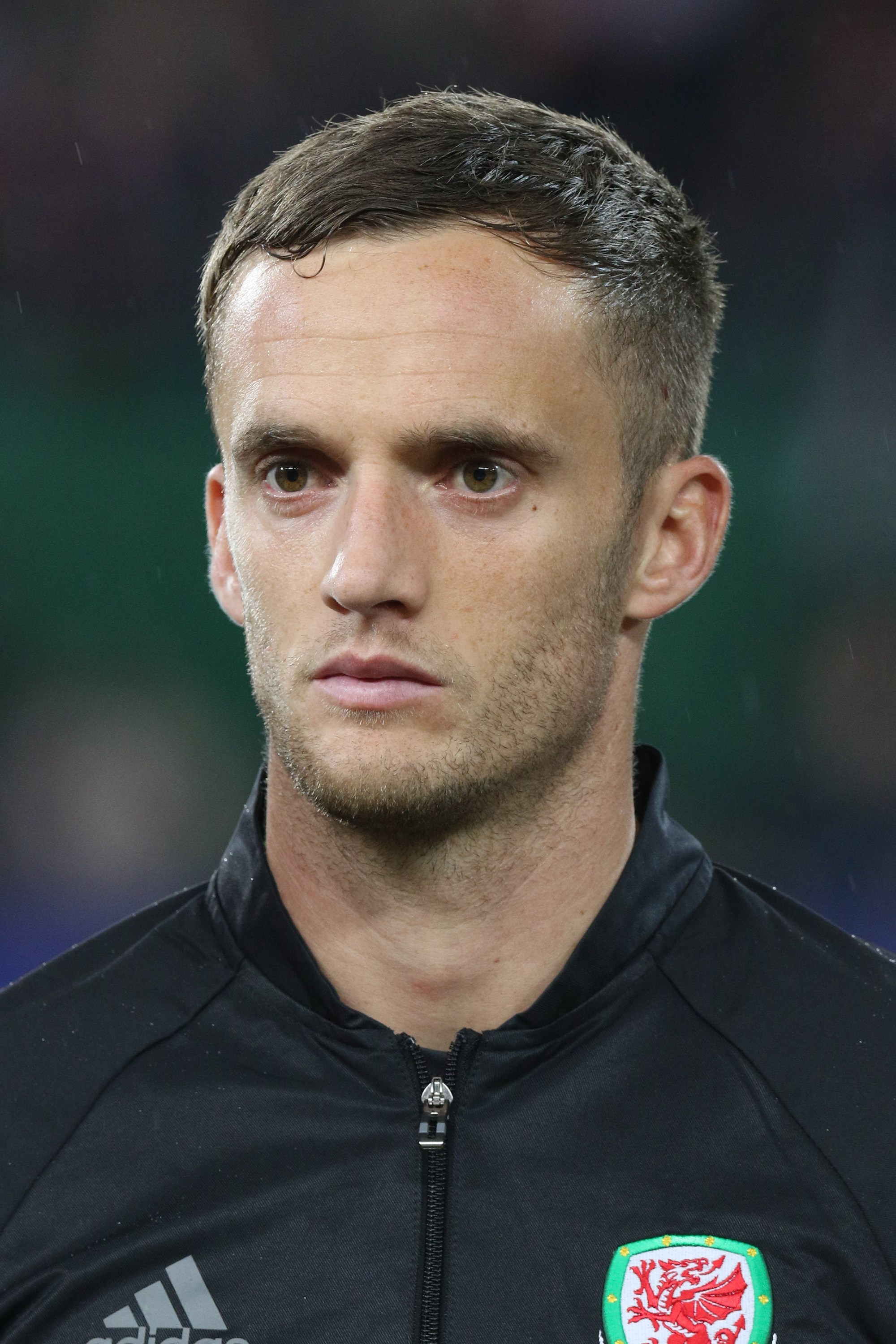
- King lining up for Wales in 2016

Personal information
- Full name: Andrew Philip King
- Date of birth: 29 October 1988 (age 38)
- Place of birth: Barnstaple, England
- Height: 6 ft 0 in (1.84 m)
- Position: Midfielder

Team information
- Current team: Leicester City (first team coach)

Youth career
- 1998–2004: Chelsea
- 2004–2006: Leicester City

Senior career*
Years	Team	Apps	(Gls)
2006–2020	Leicester City	329	(55)
2018	→ Swansea City (loan)	11	(2)
2019	→ Derby County (loan)	4	(0)
2019	→ Rangers (loan)	2	(0)
2020	→ Huddersfield Town (loan)	14	(0)
2021	OH Leuven	1	(0)
2021–2024	Bristol City	55	(1)
Total		416	(58)

International career
2007–2008	Wales U19	7	(0)
2007–2010	Wales U21	10	(2)
2009–2018	Wales	50	(2)

Managerial career
- 2026: Leicester City (interim)
Medal record
Men's football
Representing Wales
UEFA European Championship
Bronze medal – third place	2016 France
- * Club domestic league appearances and goals

Andrew Philip King (born 29 October 1988) is a professional football coach and former player who is currently the first team coach at League One club Leicester City.

A central midfielder, King spent the majority of his playing career with Leicester City, making 379 appearances across all competitions and scoring 62 goals. He won the League One, Championship and Premier League titles in 2008–09, 2013–14 and 2015–16 respectively, making him the first and only player to win the top three divisions with the same team in the Premier League era.

Born in England, King is a Wales international, qualifying through his grandfather. He made his international debut in 2009, and has gone on to earn 50 caps. He was part of the team that reached the semi-finals of UEFA Euro 2016.

== Early life ==
King was born in Barnstaple, Devon, where his family was on holiday, and was brought up in Maidenhead, Berkshire. He attended Furze Platt Senior School and joined Chelsea when he was nine years old. After being released in 2004 when he was 15 years old, he joined the Leicester City youth academy.

== Club career ==
=== Leicester City ===
==== Academy and early career ====
He was given a squad number for the 2006–07 season. During that season, King scored eight goals in 21 appearances for the Leicester academy side, which saw them win the FA Premier League Group B.

King was offered his first professional contract with Leicester on 5 May 2007. He also went on trial with Conference National team York City in August, and after playing in a pre-season friendly against Sheffield he turned down a possible loan move to the club on the advice of his agent. King made his first team debut in a 0–0 draw with Wolverhampton Wanderers on 2 October 2007, before scoring his first senior goal with a 35-yard shot described as a "rocket" in a 2–1 defeat to Southampton on 1 December. He made 11 league appearances as Leicester were relegated to League One at the end of the 2007–08 season.

==== 2008–09 season ====
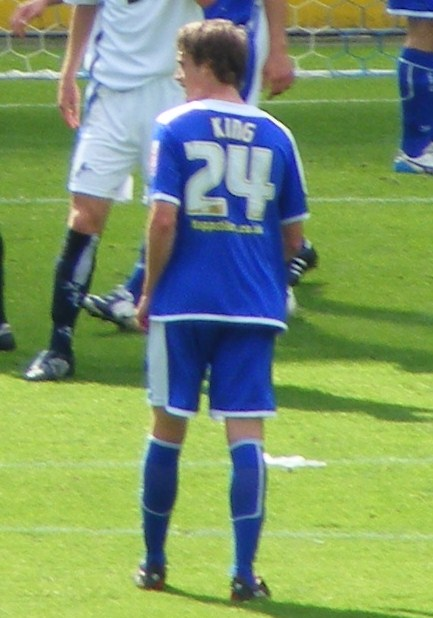
King playing for Leicester City in 2008

King's impressive start the following season earned him a new three-year contract on 21 August 2008. He scored his first goal of the season in a 3–2 League Cup defeat to Fulham on 27 August, scoring from 18 yards. He went on to score nine league goals to help Leicester secure their promotion as League One champions. His performances earned him the club's young player of the season award on 28 April 2009. He was also nominated for players' player of the season and player of the season awards, but lost out to teammates Matty Fryatt and Steve Howard. King dedicated his award to team captain Stephen Clemence, who missed the entire season through injury.

==== 2009–10 season ====
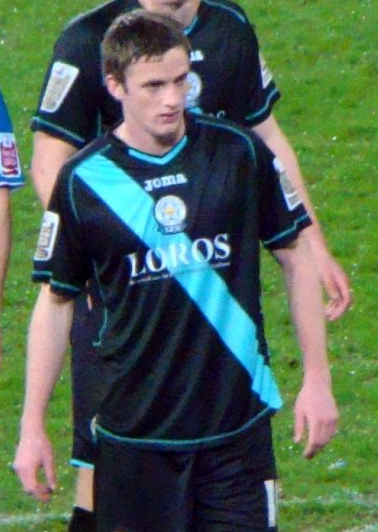
King playing for Leicester City in 2010

During pre-season, King believed the Leicester squad was good enough to challenge for promotion. He scored his first goal of the season in a 1–0 win over Plymouth Argyle at the Walkers Stadium on 21 November 2009. Following a fine start to the 2009–10 season, King said on 23 November there is a firm belief that the team can win promotion to the Premier League. He drew praise from then-manager Nigel Pearson after scoring his fourth goal of the season in a 2–1 FA Cup win over Swansea City on 2 January 2010. His overall performance earned him the players' player of the year award on 28 April 2010 which he shared with teammate Jack Hobbs.

==== 2010–11 season ====
King had his best season yet in terms of goalscoring in 2010–11, as he ended up the club's top scorer, netting 15 times in the league and 16 times in all competitions from midfield. He earned himself a four-year contract on 15 April 2011, keeping him at the club until 2015. Three days later, King's form that season was acknowledged by his fellow professionals as he was named in the Championship's PFA Team of the Year with teammate Kyle Naughton. He then took the club's players' player of the season award for a consecutive season.

==== 2011–12 season ====
King began the 2011–12 season with a goal drought, scoring just one goal in his first 14 games of the season, but got back on track, netting a brace against West Ham United on 29 October 2011, the first game following Sven-Göran Eriksson's sacking as manager, before adding his fourth of the season at home to Blackpool a month later. However, the latter part of his season was disrupted due to injury. King finished the season scoring 4 times in 32 games across all competitions, King's lowest goal and appearance tally since becoming a first team regular in the 2008–09 season.

==== 2012–13 season ====
King regained his form at the beginning of the following season though, scoring a goal in both the opening 2012–13 Championship fixtures against Peterborough United and Charlton Athletic respectively. King's central midfield partner often changed between Matty James and Danny Drinkwater with former forming a formidable partnership with King in the latter part of the season as Leicester attempted to get their promotion push back on track. King scored his 50th goal for Leicester on the final day of the 2012–13 season away at Nottingham Forest, a game that city won 3–2, a result that clinched 6th place and the final play-off position. King scored 7 times during the 2012–13 season in 48 games.

==== 2013–14 season ====
King started the 2013–14 Championship season how he finished the last: Scoring twice in the first 8 games, both fantastic strikes against Birmingham City and Blackpool. The former was voted the Foxes goal of the month for August and the latter a show in for September's award. King's first goal of the season also marked his 250th Leicester appearance. Due to the form of Drinkwater and James, King found opportunities limited to substitute appearances. King scored his 54th goal for the Foxes in their 2–2 draw against Wigan Athletic on 1 April 2014, making him the club's highest scoring midfielder in their 130-year history as Leicester made their way to the 2013–14 Football League Championship and promotion to the Premier League.

==== 2014–15 season ====
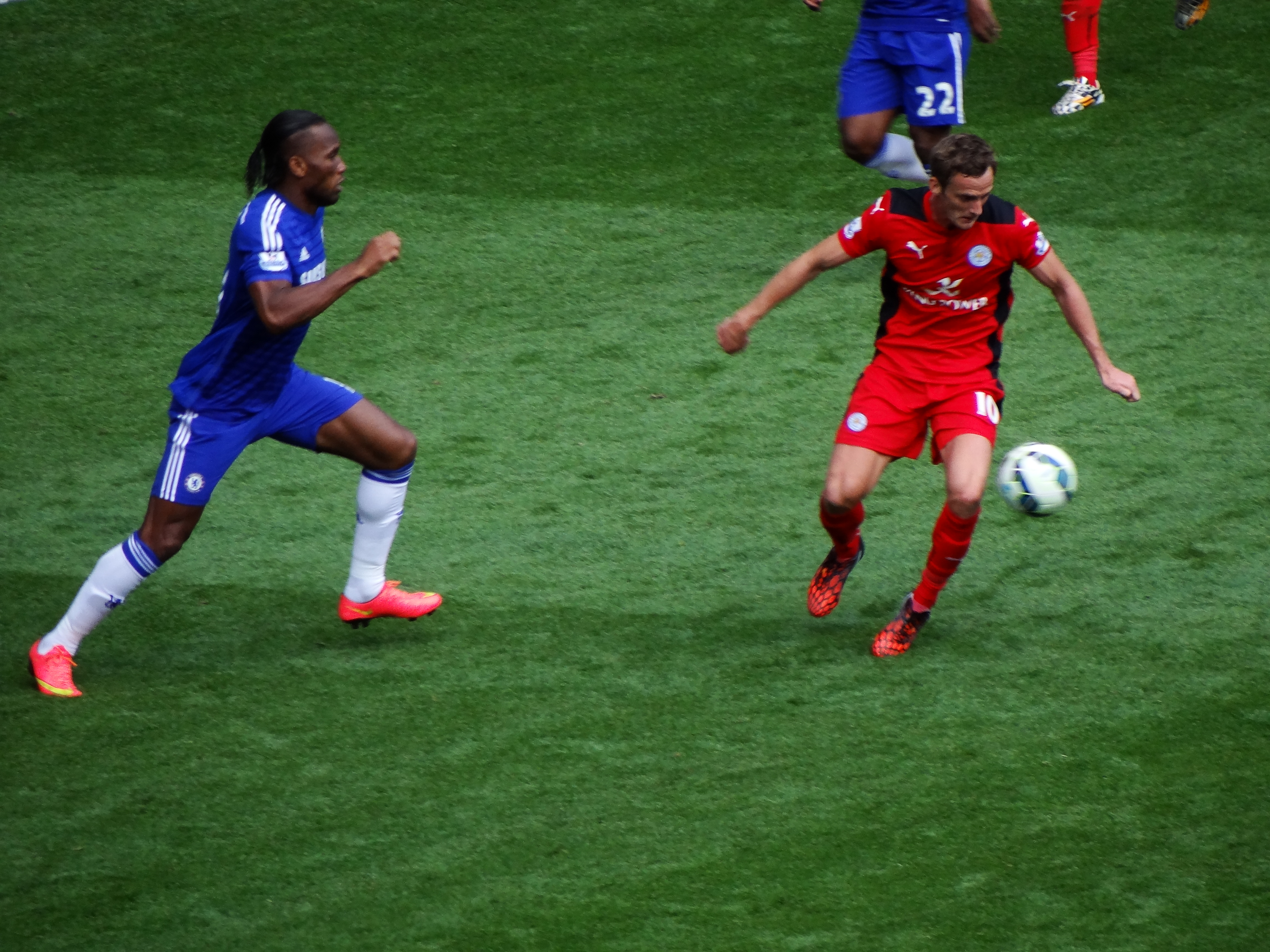
King playing for Leicester City in 2014

King made his Premier League debut, playing the full 90 minutes in the 2–2, opening day draw with Everton, putting in an impressive display, finishing the match with a 95.6% pass completion record. King signed a new four-year contract with the club on his 26th birthday, 29 October 2014, keeping him at the club until the summer of 2018, stating that he would love it if he spent his entire career with the Foxes. On 4 April 2015, King scored his 50th league goal for Leicester, a late winner in the 2–1 Premier League victory over West Ham United. On 29 April 2015, King made his 300th appearance for the club in the 1–3 defeat to Chelsea, the club that released him as a teenager.

==== 2015–16 season ====
King started the new campaign in the Leicester team, playing the full 90 minutes as Leicester topped the Premier League table following a 4–2 win against Sunderland at the King Power Stadium on 8 August 2015, with new manager Claudio Ranieri singling out him and midfield partner Danny Drinkwater for praise. He won the league title on 2 May 2016, becoming the first player to win the top three divisions with the same club in the Premier League era; Roy Bailey, Larry Carberry, John Elsworthy, Jimmy Leadbetter and Ted Phillips having previously achieved the feat with Ipswich Town in the 1950s and 1960s.

Andy King became the fourth Welsh footballer to win the Premier League, after Ryan Giggs, Mark Hughes and Clayton Blackmore.

==== 2016–17 season ====
On 29 July 2016, King signed a new four-year contract. He made his Champions League debut for Leicester on 18 October 2016, contributing in a 1–0 victory over F.C. Copenhagen at the King Power Stadium. He scored his first goal of the season in a 4–2 home win against Manchester City on 10 October 2016, his 10th consecutive season of scoring for the Foxes. He scored his second goal of the season against Derby County in the FA Cup, captaining Leicester City to a 3–1 home win.

==== Later years and loans ====
On 31 January 2018, King was sent on loan to Premier League club Swansea City until the end of the season. He scored twice for the eventually relegated Swans.

Upon his return to Leicester, King's number 10 shirt was reassigned to James Maddison, with King himself taking number 37. On 6 January 2019, King played for the first time of the season for Leicester in the FA Cup defeat against League Two side Newport County. He came on as a substitute for Matty James.

King joined Derby County on loan on 31 January 2019, signing until the end of the season. On 25 February, he suffered an ankle injury away to Nottingham Forest, and was ruled out for the rest of the season. His loan deal was cut short as a result and he returned to Leicester on 28 February.

On 15 August 2019, Rangers announced they had signed King on a season-long loan. The Scottish Premiership club cut the deal short on 5 January after just five games.

On 16 January 2020 King joined Huddersfield of the Championship on loan for the remainder of the 2019–20 season, where he played 14 games for the Terriors. His parent club confirmed on 18 June that he would be released at the end of the season.

=== OH Leuven ===
On 5 January 2021, King signed for Belgian First Division A side OH Leuven on a deal until the end of the season. However, the deal was unsuccessful as he only made one appearance for the club.

=== Bristol City ===
On 2 July 2021, King signed for Championship club Bristol City on a one-year deal. He scored his first goal for the club in a 2–1 loss at Middlesbrough on 14 August 2021. His time at Ashton Gate was much more fruitful as he went on to play 64 times for the Robins in his three years at the club, including 55 league appearances. On 30 June 2022, King became a player-coach with the club. On 3 May 2024, King announced that he would retire from football after the final game of the 2023–24 season.

== Coaching career ==
=== Leicester City ===
King returned to Leicester City on 6 December 2024 as the Under-18s assistant coach. He was quickly promoted to the first-team coaching staff on 19 February 2025 to act as a bridge between the Academy and senior side when Ruud van Nistelrooy was manager of the team during the 2024–25 season.

Van Nistelrooy left City by mutual consent on 27 June 2025, following the club's relegation from the Premier League, and King became temporary manager taking charge in three pre-season games.

Leicester City appointed Martí Cifuentes as the new First Team manager on 15 July 2025, just before the new EFL Championship season and King returned to his role as First Team coach.

On 25 January 2026, Cifuentes was fired as City fell to 14th in the Championship. That led to King being appointed as the interim head coach.

== International career ==
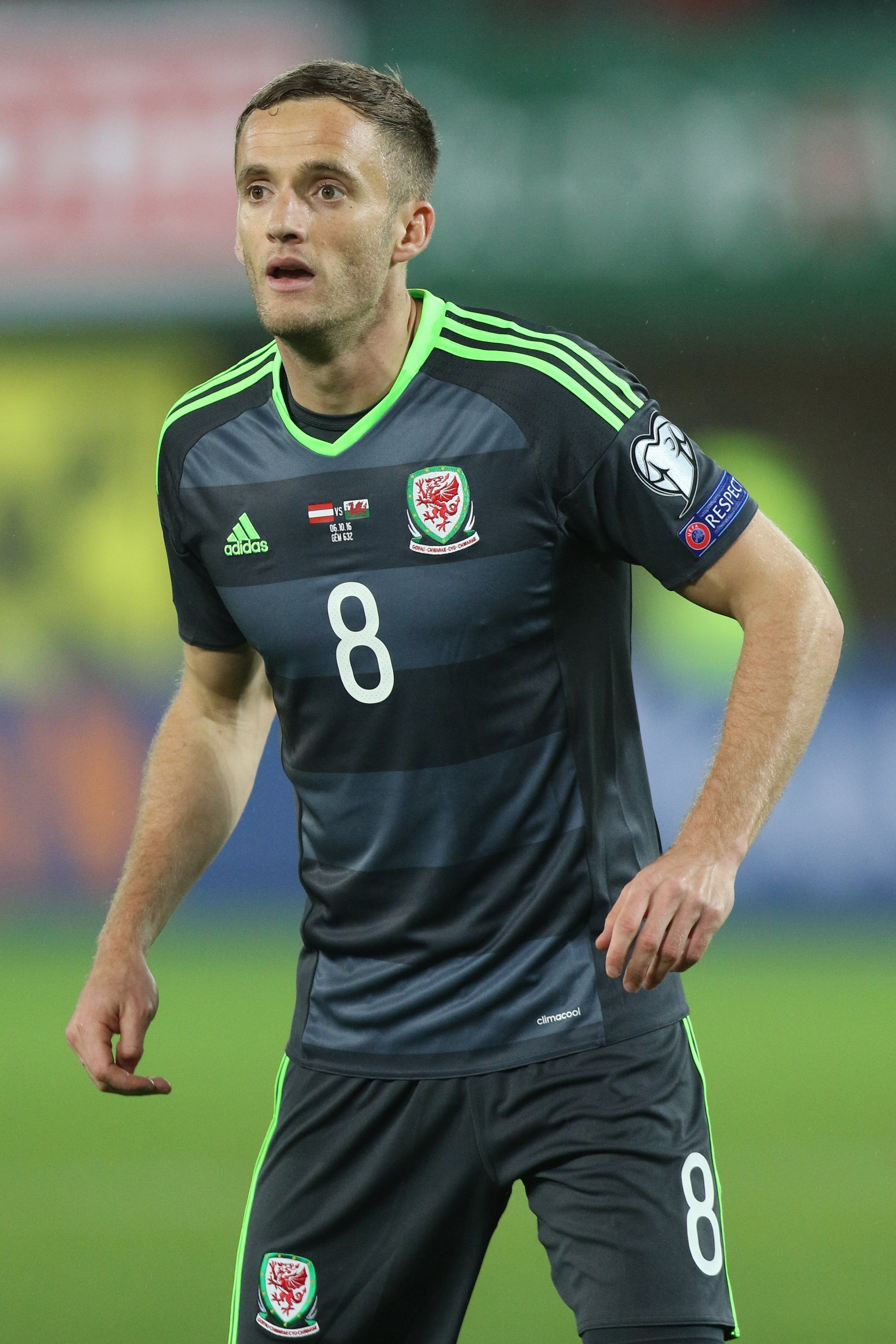
King playing for Wales in 2016

King qualified to play for Wales through a grandfather from Wrexham. He won caps for Wales under-19 and under-21 international, receiving his first call-up on 10 October 2007. He scored his first goal in a 5–1 UEFA European Under-21 Championship qualifying win over Luxembourg under-21 on 31 March 2009. He was in the squad that narrowly lost out to England in the play-offs for a spot at the 2009 UEFA European Under-21 Championship.

On 22 May 2009, King received his first call-up to the senior Wales squad when he was named in manager John Toshack's squad for a friendly match against Estonia. Despite naming King in the squad, Toshack admitted that he was not yet ready for international football. He made his debut as a last-minute substitute for Ched Evans in a 1–0 victory. King's first international goal came on 11 August 2010 in a 5–1 friendly victory over Luxembourg at Parc y Scarlets in Llanelli.

King was a regular in Wales' successful UEFA Euro 2016 qualifying campaign. He was given a straight red card in the 47th minute on 13 October 2014, in a home qualifier against Cyprus, for a foul on Constantinos Makrides. However Wales won 2–1, the same score at the time of the red card. Manager Chris Coleman blamed the attitude of himself and his staff for aggressively rallying the team prior to King's red card.

On 31 May 2016, King was included in Wales' 23-man squad for UEFA Euro 2016. King made his debut in the tournament as a substitute in Wales' 3–0 victory against Russia on 20 June, as Wales won Group B.

On 2 September 2017, King came on as a half time substitute to help Wales to a 1–0 victory against Austria in a 2018 FIFA World Cup qualifier. This was his 40th cap, therefore breaking Northern Irishman John O'Neill's record for most caps while a Leicester player.

== Career statistics ==
=== Club ===
Appearances and goals by club, season and competition
Club	Season	League			National cup (Note: Includes FA Cup)		League cup (Note: Includes Football League/EFL Cup, Scottish League Cup)		Europe		Other		Total	
Club	Season	Division	Apps	Goals	Apps	Goals	Apps	Goals	Apps	Goals	Apps	Goals	Apps	Goals
Leicester City	2007–08	Championship	11	1	1	0	0	0	—		—		12	1
Leicester City	2008–09	League One	45	9	4	1	2	1	—		3 (Note: Appearances in Football League Trophy)	0	54	11
Leicester City	2009–10	Championship	43	9	1	1	1	0	—		2 (Note: Appearances in Championship play-offs)	1	47	11
Leicester City	2010–11	Championship	45	15	2	1	3	0	—		—		50	16
Leicester City	2011–12	Championship	30	4	1	0	1	0	—		—		32	4
Leicester City	2012–13	Championship	42	7	2	0	2	0	—		2	0	48	7
Leicester City	2013–14	Championship	30	4	1	0	2	0	—		—		33	4
Leicester City	2014–15	Premier League	24	2	1	0	1	0	—		—		26	2
Leicester City	2015–16	Premier League	25	2	2	0	2	1	—		—		29	3
Leicester City	2016–17	Premier League	23	1	3	1	1	0	4 (Note: Appearances in UEFA Champions League)	0	1 (Note: Appearance in FA Community Shield)	0	32	2
Leicester City	2017–18	Premier League	11	1	1	0	3	0	—		—		15	1
Leicester City	2018–19	Premier League	0	0	1	0	0	0	—		—		1	0
Leicester City	Total		329	55	20	4	18	2	4	0	8	1	379	62
Swansea City (loan)	2017–18	Premier League	11	2	—		—		—		—		11	2
Derby County (loan)	2018–19	Championship	4	0	—		—		—		—		4	0
Rangers (loan)	2019–20	Scottish Premiership	2	0	0	0	2	0	1 (Note: Appearance in UEFA Europa League)	0	—		5	0
Huddersfield Town (loan)	2019–20	Championship	14	0	—		—		—		—		14	0
OH Leuven	2020–21	Belgian Pro League	1	0	0	0	—		—		—		1	0
Bristol City	2021–22	Championship	14	1	1	0	0	0	—		—		15	1
Bristol City	2022–23	Championship	26	0	2	0	3	0	—		—		31	0
Bristol City	2023–24	Championship	15	0	1	0	2	0	—		—		18	0
Bristol City	Total		55	1	4	0	5	0	—		—		64	1
Career total			416	58	24	5	25	2	5	0	8	1	478	65

=== International ===
Appearances and goals by national team and year
National team	Year	Apps	Goals
Wales	2009	3	0
Wales	2010	3	1
Wales	2011	5	0
Wales	2012	4	0
Wales	2013	8	1
Wales	2014	5	0
Wales	2015	4	0
Wales	2016	7	0
Wales	2017	5	0
Wales	2018	6	0
Total		50	2

Wales score listed first, score column indicates score after each King goal.

List of international goals scored by Andy King
No.	Date	Venue	Cap	Opponent	Score	Result	Competition	Ref.
1	11 August 2010	Parc y Scarlets, Llanelli, Wales	4	Luxembourg	3–1	5–1	Friendly	
2	16 November 2013	Cardiff City Stadium, Cardiff, Wales	23	Finland	1–0	1–1	Friendly	

== Managerial statistics ==
As of matches played 14 February 2026

Managerial record by team and tenure
Team	From	To	Record				
Team	From	To	P	W	D	L	Win %
Leicester City (interim)	25 January 2026	18 February 2026	4	0	0	4	0.00
Total			4	0	0	4	0.00

== Honours ==
Leicester City

- Premier League: 2015–16
- Football League Championship: 2013–14
- Football League One: 2008–09

Individual

- Leicester City Young Player of the Year: 2008–09
- Leicester City Player's Player of the Year: 2009–10 (joint winner), 2010–11
- PFA Team of the Year: 2010–11 Championship
