= Roy Bailey (footballer, born 1932) =

English footballer

Personal information
- Date of birth: 26 May 1932
- Place of birth: Epsom, Surrey, England
- Date of death: April 1993 (aged 60)
- Place of death: South Africa
- Position: Goalkeeper

Youth career
- Tottenham Hotspur
- Crystal Palace

Senior career*
Years	Team	Apps	(Gls)
1949–1956	Crystal Palace	118	(0)
1956–1965	Ipswich Town	315	(0)
Total		433	(0)

Managerial career
- 1: Cape Town City
- * Club domestic league appearances and goals

Roy Bailey (26 May 1932 – April 1993) was an English professional footballer who played as a goalkeeper. He made a total of 433 Football League appearances for Crystal Palace and Ipswich Town.

== Early life ==
Bailey was born in Epsom, Surrey, the fifth child in a family of thirteen. During World War II, he was evacuated to Somerset, and was educated in Weston-super-Mare, before returning to his native Surrey at the age of 15. He played for Tottenham Juniors; however, it was a long way to travel from Epsom to North London, so he joined nearby Crystal Palace as an Amateur. During his National Service, he served in Germany, where he represented B.A.O.R., also reaching the quarter finals of the Army Cup.

== Playing career ==
Bailey signed professional terms in June 1949 and made his League debut against Torquay United at the age of 17 when Palace lost 3–1. However, he did not make regular appearances until after his Army service. Bailey missed only one match in the 1953–54 season and was granted a benefit, along with Jack Edwards in 1954.

He was signed for Ipswich Town, by Alf Ramsey, on the day before the transfer deadline in March 1956, and came into the League side in the Easter local derby match with Norwich City at Carrow Road. He conceded two goals in the first three minutes. Despite this start, he soon displaced George McMillan as the Town's regular 'keeper, and won Championship medals in the First, Second, and Third Divisions of the Football League. He became a qualified M.C.C. coach and F.A. coach.

During the summer, he played cricket for Ipswich and East Suffolk, one of the leading clubs in Suffolk, for whom he kept wicket. He also ran the Ipswich footballers' darts team, which played weekly matches against local clubs.

His son, Gary Bailey, was a goalkeeper for Manchester United and helped them win two FA Cups in the 1980s, and was also capped twice by England, before retiring due to injury in 1987.

Roy Bailey, Larry Carberry, John Elsworthy, Ted Phillips, and Jimmy Leadbetter became the first players to have won First (now Premier League), Second (now Football League Championship), and Third Division (now Football League One) Championship medals with the same club; a feat that is only equaled by Leicester City's Andy King in 2015–16 season after Leicester City F.C. won the Premier League, having also previously won League One, and Championship with Leicester. In South Africa he coached Cape Town City.

He moved to South Africa in 1964 on retiring as a player, and lived there until he died in April 1993 at the age of 60.

== Honours ==
Ipswich Town

- Football League First Division: 1961–62
- Football League Second Division: 1960–61
- Football League Third Division South: 1956–57

Individual

- Ipswich Town Hall of Fame: Inducted 2011
