= List of Ipswich Town F.C. records and statistics =

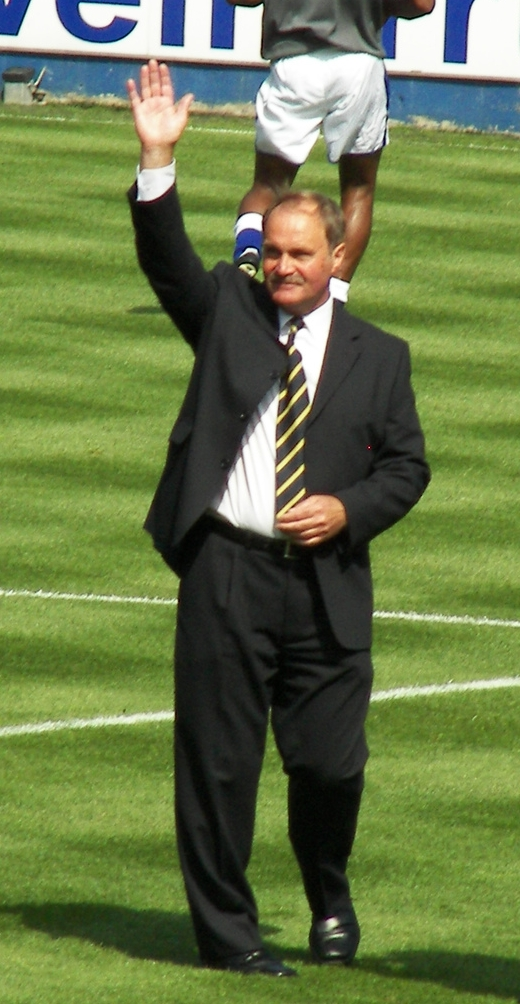
Mick Mills, holder of the record number of appearances for Ipswich Town

Ipswich Town Football Club are an English professional association football club based in Ipswich, Suffolk. The club was founded in 1878 and turned professional in 1936. Ipswich have played at all professional levels of English football and have participated in European football since the 1960s. The team currently plays in the top tier of English football.

This list encompasses the major honours won by Ipswich Town, records set by the club, their managers and their players, and details the club's European performances. The player records section includes details of the club's leading goalscorers and those who have made most appearances in first-team competitions. It also records notable achievements by Ipswich players on the international stage, and the highest transfer fees paid and received by the club. Attendance records at Portman Road, the club's home ground since 1884, are also included in the list.

== Honours ==
Ipswich Town have won honours both domestically and in European Cup competitions. The club has won the English League Championship (1961–62) and the FA Cup (1978) and, in European competition, won the UEFA Cup in 1980–81. Their last senior league honour was the Football League Second Division title in 1992.

=== Domestic ===
==== League titles ====
- First Division/Premier League (Tier 1)

Winners: 1961–62
Runners-up: 1980–81, 1981–82

- Second Division/First Division/Championship (Tier 2)

Winners: 1960–61, 1967–68, 1991–92
Runners-up: 2023–24, 2025–26
Play-off winners: 1999–2000

- Third Division/League One (Tier 3)

Winners: 1953–54, 1956–57
Runners-up: 2022–23

- Southern League

Winners: 1936–37

==== Cups ====
- FA Cup

Winners: 1977–78

- Texaco Cup

Winners: 1972–73

=== European ===
- UEFA Cup/UEFA Europa League

Winners: 1980–81

=== Minor titles ===
==== Friendly ====
- Amsterdam Tournament

Winners: 1981

- Innsbruck Cup

Winners: 2023

- Ipswich Charity Cup

Winners: 1896–97, 1897–98, 1898–99, 1899–1900

- Ipswich Hospital Cup

Winners: 1929, 1930, 1932, 1936, 1959, 1988, 1990

- Paisley Charity Cup

Winners: 1966 (shared)

- Uhren Cup

Winners: 1963

- Willhire Cup

Winners: 1978, 1979

==== Other ====
- South East Anglian League

Champions: 1903–04
Runners-up: 1904–05

- Southern Amateur League

Champions: 1921–22, 1929–30, 1932–33, 1933–34
Runners-up: 1922–23, 1930–31

- Suffolk Challenge Cup

Winners: 1886–87, 1888–89, 1889–90

- Suffolk Senior Cup

Winners: 1886–87, 1888–89, 1889–90, 1895–96, 1899–1900, 1903–04, 1904–05, 1905–06, 1906–07, 1907–08, 1911–12, 1912–13, 1913–14, 1927–28, 1928–29, 1929–30

== Player records ==
=== Appearances ===
- Youngest first-team player: Connor Wickham, 16 years 11 days (against Doncaster Rovers, 11 April 2009).
- Oldest first-team player: Mick Burns, 43 years 219 days (against Gateshead, 12 January 1952).

==== Most appearances ====
Competitive, professional matches only, appearances as substitutes in brackets.

#	Name	Years	League	FA Cup	League Cup	Other	Total
1	(England) Mick Mills	1966–82	588 (3)	57 (5)	43 (1)	49 (0)	737 (9)
2	(Scotland) John Wark	1975–84; 1988–90; 1991–96	533 (6)	55 (1)	42 (1)	40 (0)	670 (8)
3	(England) Mick Stockwell	1982–2000	464 (42)	28 (3)	42 (5)	21 (3)	555 (53)
4	(England) Paul Cooper	1973–86	447 (0)	45 (0)	43 (0)	40 (0)	575 (0)
5	(Scotland) George Burley	1973–85	394 (0)	43 (0)	35 (0)	28 (0)	500 (0)
6	(England) Tommy Parker	1946–56	428 (0)	37 (0)	0 (0)	10 (0)	475 (0)
7	(Scotland) Billy Baxter	1960–70	409 (0)	23 (1)	22 (0)	5 (0)	459 (0)
8	(Wales) John Elsworthy	1949–64	398 (0)	27 (0)	6 (0)	4 (0)	435 (0)
9	(England) Luke Chambers	2012–21	377 (0)	6 (0)	10 (1)	3 (0)	396 (1)
10	(England) Jason Dozzell	1984–93; 1997	320 (20)	22 (0)	29 (1)	22 (0)	393 (21)

=== Goalscorers ===
- Most goals in a season: Ted Phillips, 46 goals (including 41 league goals) in the 1956–57 season.
- Most league goals in a season: Ted Phillips, 41 goals in the 1956–57 season.
- Youngest goalscorer: Jason Dozzell, 16 years 57 days (against Coventry City, 4 February 1984).

==== Top goalscorers ====
Ray Crawford is the all-time top goalscorer for Ipswich Town. In the 1970–71 season, he became the first footballer to score hat-tricks in the Football League, League Cup, FA Cup and European Cup.

Competitive, professional matches only, appearances including substitutes appear in brackets.

#	Name	Years	League	FA Cup	League Cup	Other	Total
1	(England) Ray Crawford	1958–63; 1965–68	204 (320)	5 (18)	0 (10)	9 (6)	218 (354)
2	(Scotland) John Wark	1974–83; 1987–89; 1991–96	135 (539)	12 (56)	25 (43)	18 (40)	190 (678)
3	(England) Ted Phillips	1953–63	161 (269)	9 (12)	7 (5)	6 (7)	181 (295)
4	(England) Tom Garneys	1951–58	123 (248)	20 (25)	0 (0)	0 (0)	143 (273)
5	(England) Paul Mariner	1976–83	96 (260)	19 (31)	8 (28)	12 (28)	135 (339)
6	(England) Trevor Whymark	1969–78	75 (261)	2 (21)	9 (20)	18 (33)	104 (335)
7	(England) Eric Gates	1973–84	73 (296)	8 (26)	8 (29)	7 (27)	96 (378)
8	(England) Tommy Parker	1946–56	86 (428)	7 (37)	0 (0)	2 (10)	95 (475)
9	(Scotland) Alan Brazil	1977–82	70 (154)	6 (20)	3 (17)	1 (21)	80 (210)
10	(England) Jason Dozzell	1983–92; 1997	52 (340)	12 (22)	3 (30)	4 (22)	72 (414)

=== International caps ===
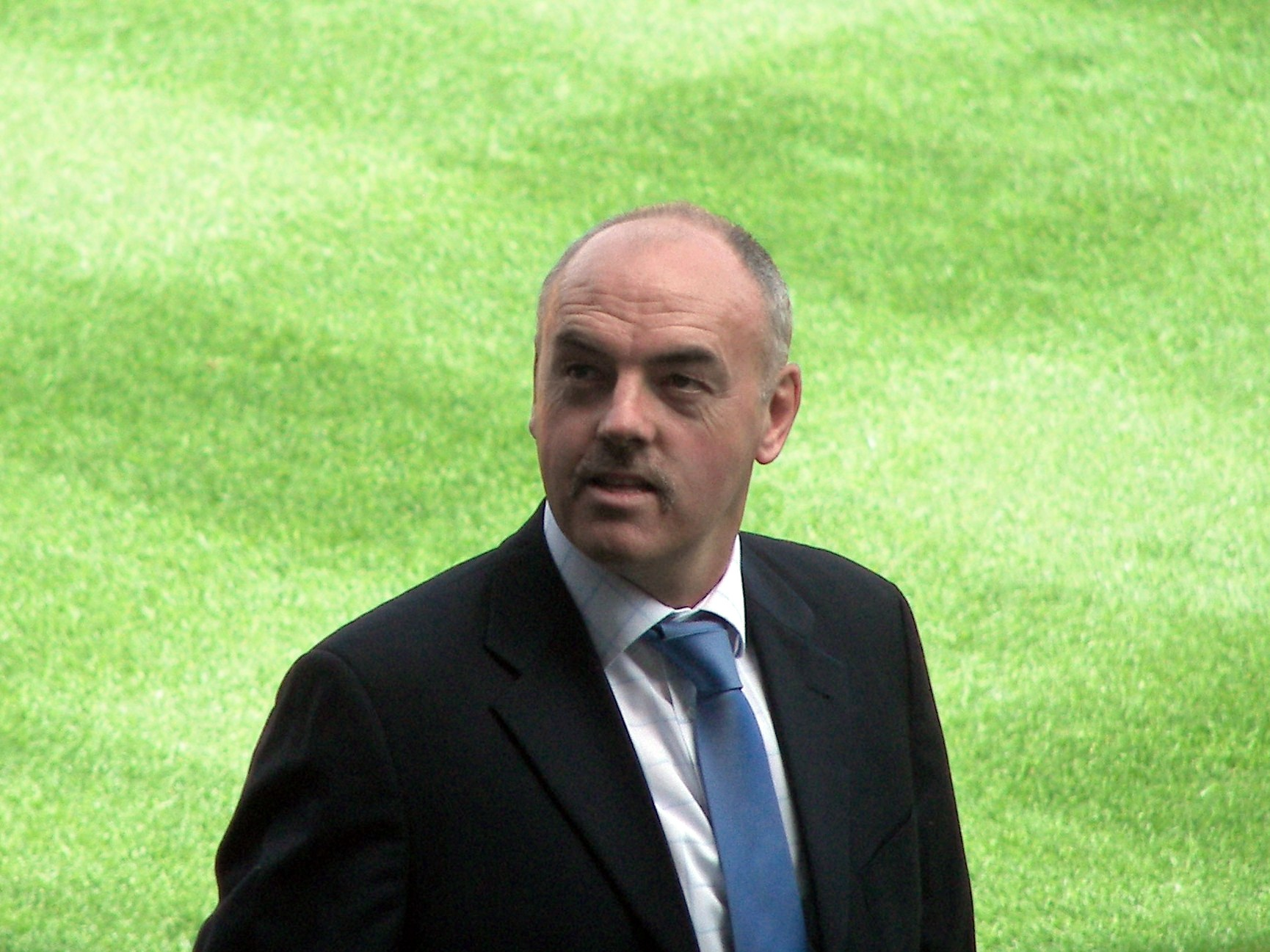
John Wark, the first Ipswich player to score in the World Cup finals

Ipswich Town turned professional in 1936, and the first player to be capped by a national side received his call-up as recently as 1952. Many of the records in this section were established during the late 1970s and early 1980s, when Ipswich achieved success unparalleled in the club's history. This section refers only to caps won while an Ipswich Town player.

- First capped player: Billy Reed for Wales against Yugoslavia on 22 September 1954.
- First capped player for England: Ray Crawford against Northern Ireland on 22 November 1961.
- Most capped player: Allan Hunter with 47 caps for Northern Ireland as an Ipswich player.
- Most capped player for England: Terry Butcher, 45 caps while an Ipswich player.
- First player to play in the World Cup Finals: Alan Brazil and John Wark for Scotland against New Zealand in Málaga on 15 June 1982.
- First player to score in a World Cup Finals: John Wark for Scotland against New Zealand in Málaga on 15 June 1982.
- First player to play for England in the World Cup Finals: Terry Butcher, Mick Mills and Paul Mariner against France in Bilbao on 16 June 1982.
- First player to score in the World Cup Finals for England: Paul Mariner against France in Bilbao on 16 June 1982.
- Most World Cup Finals appearances: Terry Butcher, 9 (1982 and 1986).
- Most World Cup Finals goals: John Wark, 2 (1982).
- First player to play in the European Championships Finals: Frans Thijssen for Holland against Germany on 14 June 1980.
- Most European Championships appearances: Claus Thomsen, 3 (1996).

=== Transfers ===
==== Firsts ====
- Sergei Baltacha became the first Soviet footballer to play in Britain when he joined Ipswich Town from Dynamo Kiev in 1988.
- Adrián Paz became the first Uruguayan to play in the Premier League after joining Ipswich in 1994.
- Ali Al-Hamadi became the first Iraqi to play in the Premier League after coming on as a substitute against Liverpool during the opening game of the 2024–25 season.

==== Record transfer fees paid ====
No.	Name	Fee	Paid to	Date	Notes
1	(Paraguay) Julio Enciso	£26.1m	(France) RC Strasbourg	17 August 2026	
2	(Brazil) Emersonn	£24m	(France) Toulouse	8 July 2026	
=3	(England) Omari Hutchinson	£20m	(England) Chelsea	30 June 2024	
=3	(England) Jaden Philogene	£20m	(England) Aston Villa	15 January 2025	
=3	(Ghana) Abdul Fatawu	£20m	(England) Leicester City	21 July 2026	

==== Record transfer fees received ====
No.	Name	Fee	Received from	Date	Notes
1	(England) Omari Hutchinson	£37.5m	(England) Nottingham Forest	16 August 2025	
2	(England) Liam Delap	£30m	(England) Chelsea	4 June 2025	
3	(England) Connor Wickham	£12m	(England) Sunderland	11 June 2011	
4	(England) Tyrone Mings	£9.2m	(England) AFC Bournemouth	25 June 2015	
5	(Wales) Nathan Broadhead	£7.5m	(Wales) Wrexham	14 August 2025	

== Managerial records ==
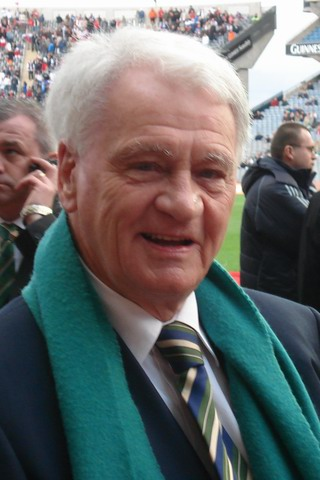
Bobby Robson, longest serving manager

- First manager in the professional era: Mick O'Brien (managed the club for 39 games from May 1936 to August 1937).
- Longest serving manager: Bobby Robson (managed the club for 709 games from January 1969 to August 1982).

== Club records ==
=== Goals ===
- Most league goals scored in a season: 106 in 46 matches, Third Division South, 1955–56.
- Fewest league goals scored in a season: 32 in 42 matches, First Division, 1985–86.
- Most league goals conceded in a season: 121 in 42 matches, First Division, 1963–64.
- Fewest league goals conceded in a season: 32 in 46 matches, First Division, 1988–89.

=== Points ===
- Most points in a season:
  - Two points for a win: 64 (in 46 games in 1953–54, Division Three South and in 1955–56, Division Three South).
  - Three points for a win: 98 (in 46 games in 2022-23, League One).
- Fewest points in a season:
  - Two points for a win: 25 (in 42 games in 1963–64, First Division).
  - Three points for a win: 22 (in 38 games in 2024–25 Premier League).

=== Matches ===
==== Firsts ====
- First match: Ipswich Town 6–1 Stoke Wanderers, a friendly at Broom Hill, 2 November 1878.
- First league match: Ipswich Town 4–1 Tunbridge Wells Rangers, Southern League at Portman Road, 29 August 1936.
- First FA Cup match: Ipswich Town 2–0 Reading, first qualifying round, 4 October 1890.
- First European match: Floriana 1–4 Ipswich Town, European Cup, preliminary round, 18 September 1962.
- First League Cup match: Ipswich 0–2 Barnsley, first round, 11 October 1960.

==== Record wins ====
- Record league win: 7–0, vs.
  - Portsmouth in the Second Division, 7 November 1964.
  - Southampton in the First Division, 2 February 1974.
  - West Bromwich Albion in the First Division, 6 November 1976.
- Record away league win: 0–6, vs.
  - Notts County, in Division One, 25 September 1982.
  - Swindon Town, in Division One, 3 April 1999.
  - Doncaster Rovers, in the Championship, 15 February 2011.
- Record FA Cup win:
  - 11–0 against Cromer, Division final, 31 October 1936.
- Record European win:
  - 10–0 against Floriana, in the European Cup, preliminary round second leg, 25 September 1962.

==== Record defeats ====
- Record league defeat:
  - 10–1 against Fulham in the First Division, 26 December 1963.
  - 9–0 against Manchester United in the Premier League, 4 March 1995.
- Record FA Cup defeat:
  - 7–0 against Chelsea in the third round, 9 January 2011.
- Record European defeat:
  - 4–0 against F.C. Bruges, in the UEFA Cup, second round second leg, 5 November 1975.

=== Record consecutive results ===
- Record consecutive wins: 9 (from 28 November 1981 to 23 January 1982).
- Record consecutive defeats: 10 (from 4 September 1954 to 16 October 1954).
- Record consecutive games without a defeat: 21 (from 11 February 2023 to 19 August 2023).
- Record consecutive games without a win: 23 (from 28 August 1963 to 14 December 1963).

=== Attendances ===
- Highest attendance at a home match (Portman Road): 38,010 (against Leeds United), FA Cup sixth round, 8 March 1975.
- Lowest attendance at Portman Road: 2,858 (against Northampton Town), Football League Division Three South Cup second round replay, 1 February 1939.

== European statistics ==
=== Record by competition ===
Competition	Played	Won	Drawn	Lost	Goals for	Goals against
European Cup	4	3	0	1	16	5
European Cup Winners' Cup	6	3	2	1	6	3
UEFA Cup	52	30	10	12	98	53
Total	62	36	12	14	120	61

=== Record by location ===
Ipswich still maintain an undefeated home record in European competition with 31 home games unbeaten. This record began in 1962, when the club first qualified for the European Cup. When Manchester United had their unbeaten 56 match home run ended in 1996 Ipswich had the longest ongoing undefeated home streak in Europe. Due to the team's absence from European competitions in recent years Dutch club AZ Alkmaar surpassed them in 2007. When AZ lost to Everton a few weeks later and saw their 32 match unbeaten run end, Ipswich took that title again. In the 2014/2015 European season PSG surpassed Ipswich, briefly taking over the title, but also saw their unbeaten run end.

Location	Played	Won	Drawn	Lost	Goals for	Goals against
Portman Road	31	25	6	0	84	12
Away venues	31	11	6	14	36	49
Total	62	36	12	14	120	61

=== European attendance records ===
- Highest home attendance: 33,663 against Barcelona, 23 October 1977.
- Lowest home attendance: 13,440 against Skeid Oslo, 3 October 1979.
- Highest away attendance: 100,000 against Barcelona, 21 March 1979.
- Lowest away attendance: 2,971 against Avenir Beggen, 15 August 2002.
