= Gromford =

Village in Suffolk, England

Coordinates: 52.1790°N 1.4904°E

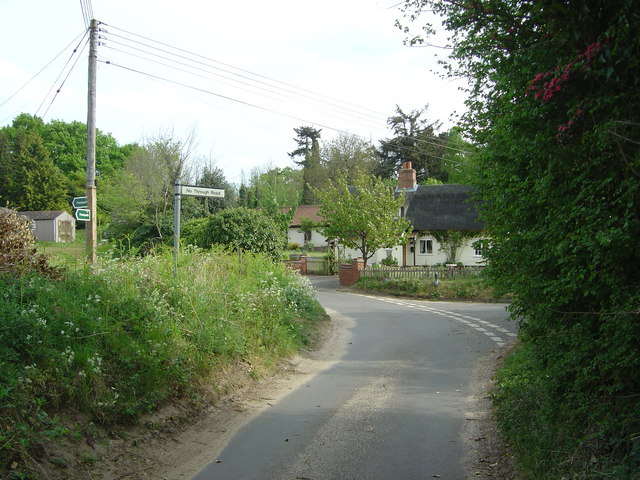
- Gromford Lane

- Location within Suffolk
- District: East Suffolk
- Shire county: Suffolk
- Region: East
- Country: England
- Sovereign state: United Kingdom
- Post town: WOODBRIDGE
- Postcode district: IP13
- Police: Suffolk
- Fire: Suffolk
- Ambulance: East of England
- UK Parliament: Central Suffolk and North Ipswich

Gromford is a small village in Suffolk, England, just north of Snape along the Gromford Lane.

== Notable persons ==
- Birthplace of Ipswich Town footballer Ted Phillips.
