= David Rose (club secretary) =

English club secretary (1942/1943–2024)

David Rose (1942 or 1943 – September 2024) was an English football club secretary of Ipswich Town F.C. He started his career at the club aged 15 under Alf Ramsey, before becoming secretary of the club in 1958. He retired in 2003, and was made an honorary vice-president of the club in 2006. In 2004, he received a UEFA Order of Merit.

Rose served on the board of the Suffolk County Football Association until 2015 when he stepped down. He sat on commissions for The Football Association.

Along with former players Chris Kiwomya and Steve McCall, Rose was inducted into the Ipswich Town F.C. Hall of Fame in March 2017 for his service to the club.

On 4 September 2024, it was announced that Rose had died at the age of 81.
