= Tommy Parker (footballer) =

English footballer

Thomas Robertson Parker (13 February 1924 – 1996) was a professional footballer. He was born in Hartlepool.

He played in midfield for Ipswich Town F.C. His career started at Ipswich Town in 1946 where he became the club captain until he retired in 1957 after playing 475 competitive games for the club.

Parker was stationed as a sailor at the nearby HMS Ganges training camp at Shotley, Suffolk. He helped raise funds for the football club through the Development Association. Tommy was a keen trout fisherman, and died in 1996.

== Honours ==
Ipswich Town

- Football League Third Division South: 1953–54, 1956–57

Individual

- Ipswich Town Hall of Fame: Inducted 2010

== See also ==
- List of one-club men in association football
