= Jimmy Leadbetter =

Scottish footballer and manager

Personal information
- Full name: James Hunter Leadbetter
- Date of birth: 15 July 1928
- Place of birth: Edinburgh, Scotland
- Date of death: 18 July 2006 (aged 78)
- Place of death: Edinburgh, Scotland
- Position: Winger

Youth career
- Murrayfield Athletic

Senior career*
Years	Team	Apps	(Gls)
??????	Edinburgh Thistle		
????–1949	Armadale Thistle		
1949–1952	Chelsea	3	(0)
1952–1955	Brighton & Hove Albion	107	(29)
1955–1965	Ipswich Town	344	(43)
1965–1970	Sudbury Town		
Total		454	(72)

Managerial career
- 1965–1970: Sudbury Town
- * Club domestic league appearances and goals

James Hunter Leadbetter (15 July 1928 – 18 July 2006) was a Scottish footballer, most notable for his achievements as a left-winger with Ipswich Town during the 1950s and 1960s. He remains the only Scottish footballer to win English Third, Second and First Division championship medals with the same club.

== Biography ==
Leadbetter was born in Edinburgh on 15 July 1928, the son of a local garage owner who had played for Bathgate. He was a pupil at Balgreen Primary School, where he was six years above Dave Mackay. He married Janet Manson in 1952, with whom he had a daughter.

=== Football career ===
Leadbetter played for Murrayfield Athletic until the age of 17, when he started his National Service in the Royal Artillery. Whilst in the Army he played for a Combined Services team managed by former Bolton and Liverpool player Johnny Wheeler. After leaving the army, he played for Hibernian feeder club Edinburgh Thistle, winning the Scottish Juvenile Cup, before turning professional with Armadale Thistle.

In July 1949 he signed for Chelsea, but failed to claim a place in the first team, playing just three games in three years. He was the first player to leave Chelsea after Ted Drake became manager, signing for Brighton & Hove Albion in 1952 as part of a player exchange deal that saw Chelsea pay Brighton £12,000 plus Leadbetter for Johnny McNichol. He became a regular player at the Goldstone Ground, averaging a goal every four matches, which saw him established as one of the best wingers outside the First Division.

In 1955 Leadbetter asked for a transfer, and Ipswich Town manager Scott Duncan signed him for £1,750. Duncan was replaced as Ipswich manager by Alf Ramsey three weeks later, and Leadbetter, then an inside forward, made his Ipswich debut in the Football League Third Division South on 8 October 1955 in a 1–0 home win over Bournemouth & Boscombe Athletic. This was his only game until December, but he then took over from George MacLuckie at outside left, earning a regular first team place. He continued his fine form at Portman Road and helped Ipswich win the division title in 1956–57, earning promotion to the Second Division. Whilst at Ipswich, Ramsey converted Leadbetter from an outside left to a more withdrawn left-winger role. He began to play deeper, threading through passes or providing crosses for the prolific goalscoring partnership of Ray Crawford and Ted Phillips. This was to be the prototype for Ramsey's Wingless Wonders, with which he won the 1966 World Cup. Ramsey later admitted "Yes, he was Scottish, but I owed him so much."

Ipswich won Division Two in 1960–61, earning promotion to the First Division for the first time in the club's history. The following season saw the club win the First Division at the first attempt. Many of the goals scored by Crawford (33) and Phillips (28) in Ipswich's championship-winning season were attributed to Leadbetter. However, in October 1962 Alf Ramsey was appointed manager of the England national team, with Jackie Milburn replacing him as Ipswich manager.

Milburn was unable to maintain Ipswich's form, and in 1963–64 Ipswich were relegated back to the Second Division. Leadbetter made 19 league appearances in 1964–65, with his final Ipswich appearance being an FA Cup game away at Tottenham Hotspur on 30 January 1965, which the club lost 5–0.

After leaving Ipswich, he managed non-league Suffolk club Sudbury Town from 1965 until 1970.

=== Playing style ===
Leadbetter was described as "a most unlikely-looking professional footballer". He was frail, had thinning hair, wrinkles around his eyes and "spindly" legs, and lacked pace. However, he was a skilful controller of the ball, good at spotting openings, and was renowned as a fearless penalty taker, Due to his thin legs, he gained the nickname "Sticks".

In 2004, he was included in the book McFootball: Great Scottish Heroes in the English Game.

=== Later life ===
After managing Sudbury, Leadbetter returned to Edinburgh to work for his father's garage business and as an Edinburgh Evening News delivery van driver for 19 years. He later lived in the Corstorphine suburb of the city. He died at home on 18 July 2006, three days after his 78th birthday. He was survived by his wife and daughter.

== Honours ==
Ipswich Town

- Football League First Division: 1961–62
- Football League Second Division: 1960–61
- Football League Third Division South: 1956–57

Individual

- Ipswich Town Hall of Fame: Inducted 2008
