= Reg Cutler =

English footballer

Personal information
- Full name: Reginald Victor Cutler
- Date of birth: 17 February 1935
- Place of birth: Rowley Regis, England
- Date of death: 5 May 2012 (aged 77)
- Place of death: Kidderminster, England
- Position: Left winger

Youth career
- West Bromwich Albion

Senior career*
Years	Team	Apps	(Gls)
1952–1956	West Bromwich Albion	5	(0)
1956–1958	Bournemouth & Boscombe Athletic	96	(21)
1958–1962	Portsmouth	100	(13)
1962–1963	Stockport County	34	(0)
- Worcester City
- Dudley Town
- Bromsgrove Rovers
Total		235	(34)
- * Club domestic league appearances and goals

Reginald Victor Cutler (17 February 1935 – 5 May 2012) was an English professional footballer who played as a winger.

== Career ==
Cutler was born in Rowley Regis on 17 February 1935. He played for West Bromwich Albion, Bournemouth & Boscombe Athletic, Portsmouth, Stockport County, Worcester City, Dudley Town and Bromsgrove Rovers.

Cutler died on 5 May 2012.
