= Aled Owen =

Welsh footballer (1934–2022)

Personal information
- Full name: Aled Watcyn Owen
- Date of birth: 7 January 1934
- Place of birth: Brynteg, Anglesey, Wales
- Date of death: 5 August 2022 (aged 88)
- Position: Winger

Senior career*
Years	Team	Apps	(Gls)
- Bangor City
1953–1958	Tottenham Hotspur	1	(0)
1958–1963	Ipswich Town	30	(3)
1963–?	Wrexham	3	(0)
Total		34	(3)
- * Club domestic league appearances and goals

Aled Watcyn Owen (7 January 1934 – 5 August 2022) was a Welsh professional footballer who played as a winger for Bangor City, Tottenham Hotspur, Ipswich Town and Wrexham.

== Career ==
Owen began his football career at non-league Bangor City. He joined Tottenham Hotspur in September 1953. He made one senior appearance for the Lilies in a 6–2 reverse against Preston North End on 19 April 1954 at White Hart Lane, the club's equal heaviest defeat at home against the Lancashire club. Owen transferred to Ipswich Town in July 1958 and went on to feature in 30 matches and netting three goals for the Portman Road club. He joined Wrexham in July 1963 where he appeared in a further three fixtures.

== Death ==
Owen died on 5 August 2022, at the age of 88.
