= Ken Malcolm =

Scottish footballer

Personal information
- Full name: Kenneth Campbell Malcolm
- Date of birth: 25 July 1926
- Place of birth: Aberdeen, Scotland
- Date of death: 23 May 2006 (aged 79)
- Place of death: Ipswich, England
- Position: Defender

Youth career
- St. Clement's

Senior career*
Years	Team	Apps	(Gls)
1949–1954	Arbroath	111	(7)
1954–1963	Ipswich Town	274	(2)
Total		385	(9)
- * Club domestic league appearances and goals

Kenneth Campbell Malcolm (25 July 1926 – 23 May 2006) was a Scottish professional footballer. He was born in Aberdeen. During his career he made over 250 appearances for Ipswich Town.
