= Larry Carberry =

English footballer

Personal information
- Full name: Lawrence James Carberry
- Date of birth: 18 January 1936
- Place of birth: Liverpool, England
- Date of death: 26 June 2015 (aged 79)
- Position: Right back

Senior career*
Years	Team	Apps	(Gls)
1956–1965	Ipswich Town	257	(0)
1965–1967	Barrow	17	(0)
1967–?	Burscough		
Total		274	(0)
- * Club domestic league appearances and goals

Lawrence James Carberry (18 January 1936 – 26 June 2015) was an English professional footballer. Carberry started his career with local amateurs Bootle in 1953. His career began when Ipswich Town manager Alf Ramsey spotted him. He turned professional with Ipswich in May 1956.

During his career at Portman Road, he made over 250 appearances. He was ever-present in the side that won the League Championship in 1961–62, having previously won the Third Division South Championship in 1957 and the Division Two Championship in 1960–61. In July 1965, he was transferred to Barrow. After a disappointing 17 league appearances in his two seasons at Holker Street, he joined Lancashire Combination side Burscough F.C. in 1967.

== Personal life ==
Carberry's grandson Adam Blakeman currently plays for Chorley F.C.

== Honours ==
Ipswich Town

- Football League First Division: 1961–62
- Football League Second Division: 1960–61
- Football League Third Division South: 1956–57

Individual

- Ipswich Town Hall of Fame: Inducted 2010
