= Reg Pickett =

English footballer

Personal information
- Full name: Reginald Arthur Pickett
- Date of birth: 6 January 1927
- Place of birth: Bareilly, British India
- Date of death: 4 November 2012 (aged 85)
- Place of death: Rowlands Castle, England
- Position: Wing half

Senior career*
Years	Team	Apps	(Gls)
1949–57	Portsmouth	123	(3)
1957–63	Ipswich Town	140	(3)
1963–64	Stevenage Town		
Total		263	(6)
- * Club domestic league appearances and goals

Reginald Arthur Pickett (6 January 1927 – 4 November 2012) was an English professional footballer. During his career he made over 100 appearances for both Portsmouth and Ipswich Town in a professional career that spanned from 1949 to 1963. Pickett had been playing non-league football with Weybridge prior to joining Portsmouth. He was a member of Portsmouth's Football League championship winning sides in the late 1940s. In 1957 he signed for Ipswich for £5,000 by Sir Alf Ramsey and was made captain. He went on to make 148 appearances for the Suffolk club, scoring four times. Born in Bareilly in India, Pickett appeared in 26 games in the 1960/61 campaign in which Ipswich won the Second Division but on only three occasions the following year when Town won the Football League championship for the only time in their history. He then joined Stevenage in June 1963, featuring regularly during the 1963/64 season before leaving the club shortly after the start of the 1964/65 campaign. He died in a nursing home in Rowlands Castle, Hampshire, on 4 November 2012, aged 85. He is the first Indian-origin player to feature in a European continental club competition.
