= John Elsworthy =

Welsh footballer

Personal information
- Full name: John Elsworthy
- Date of birth: 26 July 1931
- Place of birth: Nant-y-derry, Wales
- Date of death: 3 May 2009 (aged 77)
- Place of death: Ipswich, England
- Position: Left-half

Youth career
- –1949: Newport County

Senior career*
Years	Team	Apps	(Gls)
1949–1965	Ipswich Town	396	(44)
- * Club domestic league appearances and goals

John Elsworthy (26 July 1931 – 3 May 2009) was a Welsh footballer. A midfielder, he was signed by Ipswich Town manager Scott Duncan in May 1949, after playing as an amateur for Newport County. He played all his professional club football for Ipswich Town. He won four championship medals during Ipswich's rise up the divisions in the 1950s. As a member of Ipswich, he won Third Division South in 1953–54 and 1956–57, the Second Division in 1960–61 and the First Division league championship in 1961–62. He was selected to play for the Third Division South representative team in 1956–57.

Elsworthy was part of the Wales squad for the 1958 FIFA World Cup in Sweden but did not travel to Sweden as the Welsh FA could not afford to send a full squad. Although a member of the World Cup squad, Elsworthy was never capped by his country. In all competitions, he played 435 games and scored 53 goals for Ipswich Town between 1949 and 1965. He was an inductee of the Ipswich Hall of Fame.

After retiring from football he ran a post office branch in Ipswich. In his later years, he suffered from Alzheimer's disease. He died in May 2009, aged 77.

== Honours ==
Ipswich Town

- Football League First Division: 1961–62
- Football League Second Division: 1960–61
- Football League Third Division South: 1953–54, 1956–57

Individual

- Ipswich Town Hall of Fame: Inducted 2008

== See also ==
- List of one-club men in association football
