= 1956–57 in English football =

Football in England
- Season: 1956–57

Men's football
- First Division: Manchester United
- Second Division: Leicester City
- FA Cup: Aston Villa

The 1956–57 season was the 77th season of competitive football in England.

Manchester United won the First Division to become English football champions for the fifth time. Tottenham Hotspur were runners-up. In the Second Division it was Leicester City who finished in top spot, ahead of East Midlands rivals, Nottingham Forest. Hartlepools United finished as runners-up to Derby County in Third Division North, while in the Third Division South, Ipswich Town won the title ahead of Torquay United.

Aston Villa won a record seventh FA Cup, beating Manchester United in the final and denying their opponents the chance of being the first double winners of the 20th century. The Charity Shield featured a Manchester derby, with United defeating City in the match.

The England national team won the British Home Championship, with Scotland the runners-up.

== Honours ==
Competition	Winner	Runner-up
First Division	Manchester United (5)	Tottenham Hotspur
Second Division	Leicester City	Nottingham Forest
Third Division North	Derby County	Hartlepool United
Third Division South	Ipswich Town	Torquay United
FA Cup	Aston Villa (7*)	Manchester United
Charity Shield	Manchester United	Manchester City
Home Championship	England	Scotland

Notes = Number in parentheses is the times that club has won that honour. * indicates new record for competition

== Awards ==
Football Writers' Association

- Footballer of the Year – Tom Finney (Preston North End)

Top goalscorer

- John Charles (Leeds United), 38

== FA Cup ==
Aston Villa won the FA Cup for a then record seventh time.

== Football League ==
=== First Division ===
Manchester United's young team dominated the English game once again, retaining the First Division title and also becoming England's first representatives in the European Cup, reaching the semi-finals, and also finishing runners-up in the FA Cup to an Aston Villa side who won the trophy for a record seventh time. Tottenham Hotspur finished runners-up, while Tom Finney's influence at Preston helped the Deepdale side finish third, while another veteran winger, Stanley Matthews, helped his own side finish fourth. Leeds United enjoyed possibly their best season to date by finishing eighth, but their hopes of further achievements in the immediate future were then hit by the news that star striker John Charles would be on his way to Juventus of Italy in a transfer worth £65,000.

Charlton Athletic and Cardiff City went down to the Second Division.

Pos	Team	Pld	W	D	L	GF	GA	GAv	Pts	Qualification or relegation
1	Manchester United (C)	42	28	8	6	103	54	1.907	64	Qualification for the European Cup preliminary round
2	Tottenham Hotspur	42	22	12	8	104	56	1.857	56	
3	Preston North End	42	23	10	9	84	56	1.500	56	
4	Blackpool	42	22	9	11	93	65	1.431	53	
5	Arsenal	42	21	8	13	85	69	1.232	50	
6	Wolverhampton Wanderers	42	20	8	14	94	70	1.343	48	
7	Burnley	42	18	10	14	56	50	1.120	46	
8	Leeds United	42	15	14	13	72	63	1.143	44	
9	Bolton Wanderers	42	16	12	14	65	65	1.000	44	
10	Aston Villa	42	14	15	13	65	55	1.182	43	
11	West Bromwich Albion	42	14	14	14	59	61	0.967	42	
12	Birmingham City	42	15	9	18	69	69	1.000	39	
13	Chelsea	42	13	13	16	73	73	1.000	39	
14	Sheffield Wednesday	42	16	6	20	82	88	0.932	38	
15	Everton	42	14	10	18	61	79	0.772	38	
16	Luton Town	42	14	9	19	58	76	0.763	37	
17	Newcastle United	42	14	8	20	67	87	0.770	36	
18	Manchester City	42	13	9	20	78	88	0.886	35	
19	Portsmouth	42	10	13	19	62	92	0.674	33	
20	Sunderland	42	12	8	22	67	88	0.761	32	
21	Cardiff City (R)	42	10	9	23	53	88	0.602	29	Relegation to the Second Division
22	Charlton Athletic (R)	42	9	4	29	62	120	0.517	22	Relegation to the Second Division

Source: World Football
Rules for classification: 1) Points; 2) Goal average; 3) Goals scored
(C) Champions; (R) Relegated

=== Second Division ===
It was an East Midlands promotion double in the Second Division as Leicester City won the title by a comfortable margin, and were joined on the way upwards by runners-up and local rivals Nottingham Forest. Liverpool missed out on promotion by a single point under the management of their former player Phil Taylor, while Blackburn Rovers fell two points short of promotion.

Bury and Port Vale went down from the Second Division.

Pos	Team	Pld	W	D	L	GF	GA	GAv	Pts	Qualification or relegation
1	Leicester City (C, P)	42	25	11	6	109	67	1.627	61	Promotion to the First Division
2	Nottingham Forest (P)	42	22	10	10	94	55	1.709	54	Promotion to the First Division
3	Liverpool	42	21	11	10	82	54	1.519	53	
4	Blackburn Rovers	42	21	10	11	83	75	1.107	52	
5	Stoke City	42	20	8	14	83	58	1.431	48	
6	Middlesbrough	42	19	10	13	84	60	1.400	48	
7	Sheffield United	42	19	8	15	87	76	1.145	46	
8	West Ham United	42	19	8	15	59	63	0.937	46	
9	Bristol Rovers	42	18	9	15	81	67	1.209	45	
10	Swansea Town	42	19	7	16	90	90	1.000	45	
11	Fulham	42	19	4	19	84	76	1.105	42	
12	Huddersfield Town	42	18	6	18	68	74	0.919	42	
13	Bristol City	42	16	9	17	74	79	0.937	41	
14	Doncaster Rovers	42	15	10	17	77	77	1.000	40	
15	Leyton Orient	42	15	10	17	66	84	0.786	40	
16	Grimsby Town	42	17	5	20	61	62	0.984	39	
17	Rotherham United	42	13	11	18	74	75	0.987	37	
18	Lincoln City	42	14	6	22	54	80	0.675	34	
19	Barnsley	42	12	10	20	59	89	0.663	34	
20	Notts County	42	9	12	21	58	86	0.674	30	
21	Bury (R)	42	8	9	25	60	96	0.625	25	Relegation to the Third Division North
22	Port Vale (R)	42	8	6	28	57	101	0.564	22	Relegation to the Third Division South

Rules for classification: 1) Points; 2) Goal average; 3) Goals scored
(C) Champions; (P) Promoted; (R) Relegated

=== Third Division North ===
Derby County, who had declined sharply since their 1946 FA Cup triumph, finally enjoyed some long-awaited success by winning the Third Division North title and promotion to the Second Division.

Pos	Team	Pld	W	D	L	GF	GA	GAv	Pts	Promotion or relegation
1	Derby County (C, P)	46	26	11	9	111	53	2.094	63	Promotion to the Second Division
2	Hartlepools United	46	25	9	12	90	63	1.429	59	
3	Accrington Stanley	46	25	8	13	95	64	1.484	58	
4	Workington	46	24	10	12	93	63	1.476	58	
5	Stockport County	46	23	8	15	91	75	1.213	54	
6	Chesterfield	46	22	9	15	96	79	1.215	53	
7	York City	46	21	10	15	75	61	1.230	52	
8	Hull City	46	21	10	15	84	69	1.217	52	
9	Bradford City	46	22	8	16	78	68	1.147	52	
10	Barrow	46	21	9	16	76	62	1.226	51	
11	Halifax Town	46	21	7	18	65	70	0.929	49	
12	Wrexham	46	19	10	17	97	74	1.311	48	
13	Rochdale	46	18	12	16	65	65	1.000	48	
14	Scunthorpe & Lindsey United	46	15	15	16	71	69	1.029	45	
15	Carlisle United	46	16	13	17	76	85	0.894	45	
16	Mansfield Town	46	17	10	19	91	90	1.011	44	
17	Gateshead	46	17	10	19	72	90	0.800	44	
18	Darlington	46	17	8	21	82	95	0.863	42	
19	Oldham Athletic	46	12	15	19	66	74	0.892	39	
20	Bradford (Park Avenue)	46	16	3	27	66	93	0.710	35	
21	Chester	46	10	13	23	55	84	0.655	33	
22	Southport	46	10	12	24	52	94	0.553	32	
23	Tranmere Rovers	46	7	13	26	51	91	0.560	27	Re-elected
24	Crewe Alexandra	46	6	9	31	43	110	0.391	21	Re-elected

Source: rsssf.com
(C) Champions; (P) Promoted

=== Third Division South ===
Alf Ramsey, the former Tottenham and England player, guided Ipswich Town to title glory in the Third Division South, securing their promotion to the Second Division ahead of a Torquay side who had yet to play Second Division football. The leading pair finished a single point ahead of Colchester United, one of the Football League's newest members.

Pos	Team	Pld	W	D	L	GF	GA	GAv	Pts	Promotion or relegation
1	Ipswich Town (C, P)	46	25	9	12	101	54	1.870	59	Promotion to the Second Division
2	Torquay United	46	24	11	11	89	64	1.391	59	
3	Colchester United	46	22	14	10	84	56	1.500	58	
4	Southampton	46	22	10	14	76	52	1.462	54	
5	Bournemouth & Boscombe Athletic	46	19	14	13	88	62	1.419	52	
6	Brighton & Hove Albion	46	19	14	13	86	65	1.323	52	
7	Southend United	46	18	12	16	73	65	1.123	48	
8	Brentford	46	16	16	14	78	76	1.026	48	
9	Shrewsbury Town	46	15	18	13	72	79	0.911	48	
10	Queens Park Rangers	46	18	11	17	61	60	1.017	47	
11	Watford	46	18	10	18	72	75	0.960	46	
12	Newport County	46	16	13	17	65	62	1.048	45	
13	Reading	46	18	9	19	80	81	0.988	45	
14	Northampton Town	46	18	9	19	66	73	0.904	45	
15	Walsall	46	16	12	18	80	74	1.081	44	
16	Coventry City	46	16	12	18	74	84	0.881	44	
17	Millwall	46	16	12	18	64	84	0.762	44	
18	Plymouth Argyle	46	16	11	19	68	73	0.932	43	
19	Aldershot	46	15	12	19	79	92	0.859	42	
20	Crystal Palace	46	11	18	17	62	75	0.827	40	
21	Exeter City	46	12	13	21	61	79	0.772	37	
22	Gillingham	46	12	13	21	54	85	0.635	37	
23	Swindon Town	46	15	6	25	66	96	0.688	36	Re-elected
24	Norwich City	46	8	15	23	61	94	0.649	31	Re-elected

(C) Champions; (P) Promoted

=== Top goalscorers ===
First Division

- John Charles (Leeds United) – 38 goals

Second Division

- Arthur Rowley (Leicester City) – 44 goals

Third Division North

- Ray Straw (Derby County) – 37 goals

Third Division South

- Ted Phillips (Ipswich Town) – 42 goals

== Notable debutants ==
6 October 1956: Bobby Charlton, five days short of his 19th birthday, scores twice on his debut for Manchester United in a 4-2 home win over Charlton Athletic in the First Division.

24 October 1956: David Gaskell, 16-year-old goalkeeper, keeps goal for Manchester United in their Charity Shield match against Manchester City due to an injury to regular goalkeeper Ray Wood.

24 December 1956: Denis Law, 16-year-old Scottish forward, makes his debut for Huddersfield Town against Notts County in the Second Division.

== Europe ==
League champions Manchester United became the first English side to enter the European Cup, now in its second season. They began on a high note by eliminating Belgian champions Anderlecht, confirming qualification for the first knockout round by beating the Belgian side 10-0 in the preliminary round second leg at Maine Road. They reached the semi-finals, narrowly being beaten by defending European champions Real Madrid of Spain, who went on to retain the trophy.
