= Doug Millward =

English footballer and manager

Personal information
- Full name: Horace Douglas Millward
- Date of birth: 10 July 1931
- Place of birth: Sheffield, England
- Date of death: 23 October 2000 (aged 69)
- Place of death: Baltimore, USA
- Position: Forward

Senior career*
Years	Team	Apps	(Gls)
1951–1952	Doncaster Rovers	0	(0)
1952–1955	Southampton	0	(0)
1955–1963	Ipswich Town	143	(35)
1963–1964	Poole Town		
Total		143	(35)

Managerial career
- 1965–1966: St Mirren
- 1967: Baltimore Bays
- 1974–1975: Baltimore Comets
- * Club domestic league appearances and goals

Horace Douglas Millward (10 July 1931 – 23 October 2000) was an English professional footballer. During his career he made over 100 appearances for Ipswich Town.

He coached Baltimore Bays and Baltimore Comets.
