= 1956–57 Football League =

58th season of the Football League

The Football League
- Season: 1956–57
- Champions: Manchester United

The 1956–57 season was the 58th completed season of The Football League.

== Final league tables ==
The tables below are reproduced here in the exact form that they can be found at The Rec.Sport.Soccer Statistics Foundation website and in Rothmans Book of Football League Records 1888–89 to 1978–79, with home and away statistics separated.

Beginning with the season 1894–95, clubs finishing level on points were separated according to goal average (goals scored divided by goals conceded), or more properly put, goal ratio. In case one or more teams had the same goal difference, this system favoured those teams who had scored fewer goals. The goal average system was eventually scrapped beginning with the 1976–77 season.

From the 1922–23 season, the bottom two teams of both Third Division North and Third Division South were required to apply for re-election.

== First Division ==
First Division
- Season: 1956–57
- Champions: Manchester United; 5th English title
- Relegated: Cardiff City; Charlton Athletic
- European Cup: Manchester United
- Matches: 462
- Goals: 1,612 (3.49 per match)
- Top goalscorer: John Charles (38 goals)
- Biggest home win: Sunderland 8–1 Charlton Athletic (1 September 1956)
- Biggest away win: Charlton Athletic 1–5 Manchester United (18 February 1957)
- Highest scoring: Arsenal 7–3 Manchester City (6 October 1956); Wolverhampton Wanderers 7–3 Charlton Athletic (16 February 1957)

Pos	Team	Pld	W	D	L	GF	GA	GAv	Pts	Qualification or relegation
1	Manchester United (C)	42	28	8	6	103	54	1.907	64	Qualification for the European Cup preliminary round
2	Tottenham Hotspur	42	22	12	8	104	56	1.857	56	
3	Preston North End	42	23	10	9	84	56	1.500	56	
4	Blackpool	42	22	9	11	93	65	1.431	53	
5	Arsenal	42	21	8	13	85	69	1.232	50	
6	Wolverhampton Wanderers	42	20	8	14	94	70	1.343	48	
7	Burnley	42	18	10	14	56	50	1.120	46	
8	Leeds United	42	15	14	13	72	63	1.143	44	
9	Bolton Wanderers	42	16	12	14	65	65	1.000	44	
10	Aston Villa	42	14	15	13	65	55	1.182	43	
11	West Bromwich Albion	42	14	14	14	59	61	0.967	42	
12	Birmingham City	42	15	9	18	69	69	1.000	39	
13	Chelsea	42	13	13	16	73	73	1.000	39	
14	Sheffield Wednesday	42	16	6	20	82	88	0.932	38	
15	Everton	42	14	10	18	61	79	0.772	38	
16	Luton Town	42	14	9	19	58	76	0.763	37	
17	Newcastle United	42	14	8	20	67	87	0.770	36	
18	Manchester City	42	13	9	20	78	88	0.886	35	
19	Portsmouth	42	10	13	19	62	92	0.674	33	
20	Sunderland	42	12	8	22	67	88	0.761	32	
21	Cardiff City (R)	42	10	9	23	53	88	0.602	29	Relegation to the Second Division
22	Charlton Athletic (R)	42	9	4	29	62	120	0.517	22	Relegation to the Second Division

Source: World Football
Rules for classification: 1) Points; 2) Goal average; 3) Goals scored
(C) Champions; (R) Relegated

=== Results ===
Home \ Away	ARS	AST	BIR	BLP	BOL	BUR	CAR	CHA	CHE	EVE	LEE	LUT	MCI	MUN	NEW	POR	PNE	SHW	SUN	TOT	WBA	WOL
Arsenal		2–1	4–0	1–1	3–0	2–0	0–0	3–1	2–0	2–0	1–0	1–3	7–3	1–2	0–1	1–1	1–2	6–3	1–1	3–1	4–1	0–0
Aston Villa	0–0		3–1	3–2	0–0	1–0	4–1	3–1	1–1	5–1	1–1	1–3	2–2	1–3	3–1	2–2	2–0	5–0	2–2	2–4	0–0	4–0
Birmingham City	4–2	1–2		2–2	0–0	2–0	2–1	4–2	0–1	1–3	6–2	3–0	3–3	3–1	6–1	3–1	3–0	4–0	1–2	0–0	2–0	2–2
Blackpool	2–4	0–0	3–1		4–2	1–0	3–1	3–2	1–0	5–2	1–1	4–0	4–1	2–2	2–3	5–0	4–0	3–1	1–2	4–1	0–1	3–2
Bolton Wanderers	2–1	0–0	3–1	4–1		3–0	2–0	2–0	2–2	1–1	5–3	2–2	1–0	2–0	3–1	1–1	2–3	3–2	2–1	1–0	1–1	0–3
Burnley	3–1	2–1	2–0	2–2	1–0		6–2	2–1	2–0	2–1	0–0	1–1	0–3	1–3	3–2	1–1	2–2	4–1	2–0	1–0	1–0	3–0
Cardiff City	2–3	1–0	1–2	3–4	2–0	3–3		2–3	1–1	1–0	4–1	0–0	1–1	2–3	5–2	0–2	2–3	2–1	1–0	0–3	0–0	2–2
Charlton Athletic	1–3	0–2	1–0	0–4	2–1	1–2	0–2		3–1	1–2	1–2	1–2	1–0	1–5	1–1	1–3	3–4	4–4	3–2	1–1	3–2	2–1
Chelsea	1–1	1–1	1–0	2–2	2–2	2–0	1–2	1–3		5–1	1–1	4–1	4–2	1–2	6–2	3–3	1–0	0–0	0–2	2–4	2–4	3–3
Everton	4–0	0–4	2–0	2–3	2–2	1–0	0–0	5–0	0–3		2–1	2–1	1–1	1–2	2–1	2–2	1–4	1–0	2–1	1–1	0–1	3–1
Leeds United	3–3	1–0	1–1	5–0	3–2	1–1	3–0	4–0	0–0	5–1		1–2	2–0	1–2	0–0	4–1	1–2	3–1	3–1	1–1	0–0	0–0
Luton Town	1–2	0–0	0–0	0–2	1–0	0–2	3–0	4–2	0–4	2–0	2–2		3–2	0–2	4–1	1–0	1–1	2–0	6–2	1–3	0–1	1–0
Manchester City	2–3	1–1	3–1	0–3	1–3	0–1	4–1	5–1	5–4	2–4	1–0	3–2		2–4	1–2	5–1	0–2	4–2	3–1	2–2	2–1	2–3
Manchester United	6–2	1–1	2–2	0–2	0–2	2–0	3–1	4–2	3–0	2–5	3–2	3–1	2–0		6–1	3–0	3–2	4–1	4–0	0–0	1–1	3–0
Newcastle United	3–1	1–2	3–2	2–1	4–0	1–1	1–0	3–1	1–2	0–0	2–3	2–2	0–3	1–1		2–1	1–2	1–2	6–2	2–2	5–2	2–1
Portsmouth	2–3	5–1	3–4	0–0	1–1	1–0	1–0	1–0	2–2	3–2	2–5	2–2	0–1	1–3	2–2		2–2	3–1	3–2	2–3	0–1	1–0
Preston North End	3–0	3–3	1–0	0–0	2–2	1–0	6–0	4–3	1–0	0–0	3–0	2–0	3–1	1–3	1–0	7–1		1–0	6–0	1–4	3–2	1–0
Sheffield Wednesday	2–4	2–1	3–0	1–2	1–2	0–0	5–3	3–1	4–0	2–2	2–3	3–0	2–2	2–1	4–0	3–1	3–1		3–2	4–1	4–2	2–1
Sunderland	1–0	1–0	0–1	5–2	3–0	2–1	1–1	8–1	1–3	1–1	2–0	1–0	1–1	1–3	1–2	3–3	0–0	5–2		0–2	1–4	2–3
Tottenham Hotspur	1–3	3–0	5–1	2–1	4–0	2–0	5–0	6–2	3–4	6–0	5–1	5–0	3–2	2–2	3–1	2–0	1–1	1–1	5–2		2–2	4–1
West Bromwich Albion	0–2	2–0	0–0	1–3	3–2	2–2	1–2	2–2	2–1	3–0	0–0	4–0	1–1	2–3	1–0	2–1	0–0	1–4	2–0	1–1		1–1
Wolverhampton Wanderers	5–2	3–0	3–0	4–1	3–2	1–2	3–1	7–3	3–1	2–1	1–2	5–4	5–1	1–1	2–0	6–0	4–3	2–1	2–2	3–0	5–2	

Updated to match(es) played on unknown. Source: Ian Laschke: Rothmans Book of Football League Records 1888–89 to 1978–79. Macdonald and Jane’s, London & Sydney, 1980.
Legend: Blue = home team win; Yellow = draw; Red = away team win.

=== Maps ===
Locations of the Football League First Division London teams 1956–1957
Locations of the Football League First Division 1956–1957 teams

== Second Division ==
Second Division
- Season: 1956–57
- Champions: Leicester City
- Promoted: Leicester City; Nottingham Forest
- Relegated: Bury; Port Vale
- Matches: 462
- Goals: 1,644 (3.56 per match)
- Top goalscorer: Arthur Rowley (44 goals)

Pos	Team	Pld	W	D	L	GF	GA	GAv	Pts	Qualification or relegation
1	Leicester City (C, P)	42	25	11	6	109	67	1.627	61	Promotion to the First Division
2	Nottingham Forest (P)	42	22	10	10	94	55	1.709	54	Promotion to the First Division
3	Liverpool	42	21	11	10	82	54	1.519	53	
4	Blackburn Rovers	42	21	10	11	83	75	1.107	52	
5	Stoke City	42	20	8	14	83	58	1.431	48	
6	Middlesbrough	42	19	10	13	84	60	1.400	48	
7	Sheffield United	42	19	8	15	87	76	1.145	46	
8	West Ham United	42	19	8	15	59	63	0.937	46	
9	Bristol Rovers	42	18	9	15	81	67	1.209	45	
10	Swansea Town	42	19	7	16	90	90	1.000	45	
11	Fulham	42	19	4	19	84	76	1.105	42	
12	Huddersfield Town	42	18	6	18	68	74	0.919	42	
13	Bristol City	42	16	9	17	74	79	0.937	41	
14	Doncaster Rovers	42	15	10	17	77	77	1.000	40	
15	Leyton Orient	42	15	10	17	66	84	0.786	40	
16	Grimsby Town	42	17	5	20	61	62	0.984	39	
17	Rotherham United	42	13	11	18	74	75	0.987	37	
18	Lincoln City	42	14	6	22	54	80	0.675	34	
19	Barnsley	42	12	10	20	59	89	0.663	34	
20	Notts County	42	9	12	21	58	86	0.674	30	
21	Bury (R)	42	8	9	25	60	96	0.625	25	Relegation to the Third Division North
22	Port Vale (R)	42	8	6	28	57	101	0.564	22	Relegation to the Third Division South

Rules for classification: 1) Points; 2) Goal average; 3) Goals scored
(C) Champions; (P) Promoted; (R) Relegated

=== Results ===
Home \ Away	BAR	BLB	BRI	BRR	BRY	DON	FUL	GRI	HUD	LEI	LEY	LIN	LIV	MID	NOT	NTC	PTV	ROT	SHU	STK	SWA	WHU
Barnsley		3–3	3–0	0–2	1–1	3–1	1–1	2–0	0–5	2–0	3–0	5–2	4–1	1–3	1–1	1–1	2–0	1–1	1–6	2–2	2–3	1–2
Blackburn Rovers	2–0		3–1	2–0	6–2	2–2	2–0	2–0	3–2	1–1	3–3	3–4	2–2	1–0	2–2	1–1	2–4	3–2	3–1	1–0	5–3	0–2
Bristol City	1–2	3–0		5–3	2–0	4–0	0–3	0–2	2–1	0–2	4–2	5–1	2–1	2–1	1–5	3–0	3–3	2–1	5–1	1–2	3–1	1–1
Bristol Rovers	1–1	0–1	0–0		6–1	6–1	4–0	1–0	4–0	1–2	3–2	0–1	0–0	0–2	3–2	3–0	2–1	4–2	3–1	4–0	1–1	1–1
Bury	1–2	2–2	2–3	7–2		4–4	0–1	2–3	1–3	4–5	1–3	1–0	0–2	3–2	1–2	2–1	1–0	1–4	0–1	0–1	1–3	3–3
Doncaster Rovers	5–2	1–1	4–1	2–4	1–1		4–0	0–1	4–0	0–2	6–1	3–1	1–1	2–1	1–1	4–2	4–0	1–1	1–0	4–0	0–1	3–0
Fulham	2–0	7–2	2–1	3–2	1–3	3–0		3–1	1–0	2–2	3–1	0–1	1–2	1–2	0–1	5–1	6–3	3–1	1–2	1–0	7–3	1–4
Grimsby Town	4–1	1–3	0–3	3–2	0–1	4–2	3–1		1–2	2–2	0–0	2–0	0–0	3–2	0–0	2–1	1–0	3–2	1–2	4–1	5–0	2–1
Huddersfield Town	2–0	0–2	2–1	2–1	1–2	0–1	1–1	2–1		1–2	3–0	0–1	0–3	0–1	1–0	3–0	3–1	1–0	1–4	2–2	2–2	6–2
Leicester City	5–2	6–0	1–1	7–2	3–0	3–1	1–3	4–3	2–2		1–4	4–3	3–2	1–1	0–0	6–3	2–1	5–2	5–0	3–2	1–1	5–3
Leyton Orient	2–0	1–1	2–2	1–1	4–3	1–1	0–2	1–1	3–1	1–5		2–1	0–4	1–1	1–4	2–2	3–2	2–1	1–2	2–2	3–0	1–2
Lincoln City	4–1	1–2	1–1	1–0	2–0	4–1	1–0	1–0	1–2	2–3	0–2		3–3	1–1	0–2	1–0	4–0	3–3	4–1	0–1	0–2	0–2
Liverpool	2–1	2–3	2–1	4–1	2–0	2–1	4–3	3–2	2–3	2–0	1–0	4–0		1–2	3–1	3–3	4–1	4–1	5–1	0–2	2–0	1–0
Middlesbrough	1–2	2–1	4–1	3–2	2–2	3–2	3–1	2–1	7–2	1–3	1–2	3–0	1–1		2–2	0–0	3–1	0–1	3–1	1–1	6–2	3–1
Nottingham Forest	7–1	2–1	2–2	1–1	5–1	2–1	3–1	2–1	0–0	1–2	1–2	1–1	1–0	0–4		2–4	4–2	3–1	2–1	4–0	4–3	3–0
Notts County	3–2	2–0	1–1	0–2	2–2	1–2	0–0	0–1	1–2	0–0	1–3	3–0	1–1	2–1	1–2		3–1	1–5	2–2	5–0	1–4	4–1
Port Vale	0–0	0–3	3–1	2–3	3–2	4–1	2–1	3–0	1–2	2–3	1–2	1–1	1–2	2–1	1–7	1–2		2–1	0–6	2–2	0–2	0–0
Rotherham United	0–0	0–2	6–1	0–0	1–1	0–1	4–3	2–1	3–3	1–1	2–0	3–0	2–2	2–3	3–2	0–0	1–0		0–4	1–0	6–1	0–1
Sheffield United	5–0	0–2	1–1	0–0	1–1	4–0	5–2	2–0	2–0	1–1	2–3	2–0	3–0	2–1	0–4	5–1	4–2	2–7		1–1	2–2	1–0
Stoke City	3–0	4–1	0–2	2–1	2–0	1–1	0–2	1–0	5–1	3–1	7–1	8–0	1–0	3–1	2–1	6–0	3–1	6–0	3–3		4–1	0–1
Swansea Town	2–3	5–1	5–0	2–3	3–0	4–2	4–5	3–1	4–2	2–3	1–0	1–2	1–1	2–2	1–4	2–1	2–2	1–0	4–1	1–0		3–1
West Ham United	2–0	1–3	3–1	1–2	1–0	1–1	2–1	0–1	0–2	2–1	2–1	2–1	1–1	1–1	2–1	2–1	2–1	1–1	3–2	1–0	1–2	

Updated to match(es) played on unknown. Source: Ian Laschke: Rothmans Book of Football League Records 1888–89 to 1978–79. Macdonald and Jane’s, London & Sydney, 1980.
Legend: Blue = home team win; Yellow = draw; Red = away team win.

=== Maps ===
Locations of the Football League Second Division London teams 1956–1957
Locations of the Football League Second Division 1956–1957 teams

== Third Division North ==
Football League Third Division North
- Season: 1956–57
- Champions: Derby County (1st title)
- Failed re-election: none
- Matches: 552
- Goals: 1,841 (3.34 per match)
- Top goalscorer: Ray Straw (Derby County), 37

Pos	Team	Pld	W	D	L	GF	GA	GAv	Pts	Promotion or relegation
1	Derby County (C, P)	46	26	11	9	111	53	2.094	63	Promotion to the Second Division
2	Hartlepools United	46	25	9	12	90	63	1.429	59	
3	Accrington Stanley	46	25	8	13	95	64	1.484	58	
4	Workington	46	24	10	12	93	63	1.476	58	
5	Stockport County	46	23	8	15	91	75	1.213	54	
6	Chesterfield	46	22	9	15	96	79	1.215	53	
7	York City	46	21	10	15	75	61	1.230	52	
8	Hull City	46	21	10	15	84	69	1.217	52	
9	Bradford City	46	22	8	16	78	68	1.147	52	
10	Barrow	46	21	9	16	76	62	1.226	51	
11	Halifax Town	46	21	7	18	65	70	0.929	49	
12	Wrexham	46	19	10	17	97	74	1.311	48	
13	Rochdale	46	18	12	16	65	65	1.000	48	
14	Scunthorpe & Lindsey United	46	15	15	16	71	69	1.029	45	
15	Carlisle United	46	16	13	17	76	85	0.894	45	
16	Mansfield Town	46	17	10	19	91	90	1.011	44	
17	Gateshead	46	17	10	19	72	90	0.800	44	
18	Darlington	46	17	8	21	82	95	0.863	42	
19	Oldham Athletic	46	12	15	19	66	74	0.892	39	
20	Bradford (Park Avenue)	46	16	3	27	66	93	0.710	35	
21	Chester	46	10	13	23	55	84	0.655	33	
22	Southport	46	10	12	24	52	94	0.553	32	
23	Tranmere Rovers	46	7	13	26	51	91	0.560	27	Re-elected
24	Crewe Alexandra	46	6	9	31	43	110	0.391	21	Re-elected

Source: rsssf.com
(C) Champions; (P) Promoted

=== Results ===
Home \ Away	ACC	BRW	BRA	BPA	CRL	CHE	CHF	CRE	DAR	DER	GAT	HAL	HAR	HUL	MAN	OLD	ROC	SCU	SOU	STP	TRA	WRK	WRE	YOR
Accrington Stanley		4–1	0–2	5–0	1–2	4–0	1–1	5–0	4–2	0–0	2–0	4–0	2–1	0–3	3–3	2–2	2–1	0–1	4–2	4–0	1–0	2–1	1–0	3–0
Barrow	3–1		4–0	1–0	3–0	3–0	2–1	3–0	3–1	2–2	1–2	1–0	3–1	1–2	2–0	2–1	2–0	1–2	1–1	0–3	5–0	5–2	2–1	1–2
Bradford City	1–2	0–2		2–0	3–2	1–0	3–2	5–1	1–2	0–2	3–1	1–0	1–1	2–1	4–3	4–1	1–1	3–1	3–1	1–1	4–1	2–3	2–1	0–2
Bradford Park Avenue	2–0	4–1	2–0		1–3	3–1	2–0	4–3	3–1	3–2	0–1	2–1	0–2	4–1	1–4	2–2	0–0	1–2	2–3	3–2	1–2	1–3	0–4	0–2
Carlisle United	2–2	1–1	1–4	2–1		3–0	4–2	2–1	1–2	1–3	3–2	0–0	2–1	1–3	6–1	2–2	2–1	0–0	1–2	3–3	2–2	1–1	2–2	2–0
Chester	0–2	2–0	1–2	2–0	1–2		3–4	4–1	0–3	2–2	4–1	1–1	0–1	1–1	6–2	1–0	2–2	2–2	2–0	1–4	1–1	1–0	0–0	3–4
Chesterfield	1–0	3–2	1–1	4–1	2–2	3–0		2–0	4–1	2–2	6–0	2–1	5–1	3–1	1–0	1–0	2–2	1–0	6–0	1–0	3–1	2–2	2–1	3–4
Crewe Alexandra	3–4	1–1	1–0	2–0	2–2	0–0	0–4		1–3	2–5	0–3	1–3	1–2	2–3	6–4	2–2	1–6	2–1	0–0	0–1	0–0	0–1	3–0	1–1
Darlington	0–0	1–1	3–2	0–5	0–1	5–1	4–1	3–0		1–1	7–0	0–1	3–1	1–1	1–3	1–0	4–3	1–2	1–0	3–1	1–1	4–2	1–5	2–4
Derby County	2–2	3–3	0–2	6–1	3–0	3–0	7–1	4–0	1–1		5–3	6–0	2–0	1–0	4–0	3–2	3–0	4–0	2–0	2–0	4–0	2–3	1–0	1–0
Gateshead	1–1	2–2	1–2	1–3	4–2	4–1	1–3	1–1	1–2	1–1		2–1	4–3	2–0	1–1	2–3	2–1	0–0	3–1	1–5	3–1	1–2	4–0	0–2
Halifax Town	0–1	3–2	0–2	3–1	1–3	2–1	2–1	1–0	3–2	1–0	0–1		2–0	1–0	2–1	1–1	2–1	1–0	3–1	3–2	4–0	4–2	1–2	0–0
Hartlepools United	2–1	2–0	2–0	2–1	2–1	2–2	5–1	2–0	2–1	2–1	4–1	0–1		3–3	2–1	4–1	0–0	0–0	5–2	4–1	5–1	2–1	2–1	2–0
Hull City	2–1	3–0	1–0	2–0	0–0	2–0	3–2	2–0	1–1	3–3	1–1	3–1	2–0		1–2	2–1	2–0	2–2	2–1	5–3	4–1	0–2	1–2	1–1
Mansfield Town	1–3	1–3	3–1	2–1	5–1	1–1	3–0	2–1	7–3	1–2	2–4	2–0	4–1	2–1		2–4	2–3	1–1	1–2	4–2	3–0	2–2	3–1	4–1
Oldham Athletic	2–4	0–1	1–1	3–1	2–2	0–0	3–3	2–0	3–2	1–2	1–2	4–3	0–0	1–3	1–1		0–1	1–1	2–1	2–0	1–0	1–0	1–2	3–1
Rochdale	0–2	1–0	4–1	2–1	2–1	2–1	1–0	1–1	3–0	3–1	0–0	1–1	1–0	4–3	0–0	0–2		3–0	6–1	2–2	1–0	0–0	0–2	1–0
Scunthorpe & Lindsey United	2–3	1–1	1–1	2–2	1–2	3–0	5–1	5–1	1–2	1–4	1–2	6–1	1–2	1–1	0–1	0–0	1–0		1–0	2–3	1–4	2–1	4–3	2–1
Southport	3–5	0–0	1–5	5–1	4–1	1–1	0–0	0–1	1–0	3–2	2–3	1–1	1–6	1–0	1–1	2–0	0–1	2–2		0–1	1–0	0–1	1–1	1–1
Stockport County	2–1	2–1	1–1	4–0	2–0	2–1	2–1	2–0	5–2	3–2	1–1	2–2	2–4	1–2	2–1	2–1	3–1	1–3	2–0		3–1	0–1	4–0	3–0
Tranmere Rovers	1–2	0–2	0–0	0–3	0–1	3–1	2–2	3–0	2–2	0–1	0–0	0–2	0–1	2–4	3–1	2–1	2–2	4–2	1–1	2–2		1–1	2–4	3–3
Workington	4–1	0–1	5–1	0–1	2–0	0–1	2–1	4–0	6–2	2–1	2–1	3–1	1–1	4–3	3–3	0–0	5–0	2–2	2–0	4–1	3–2		3–0	3–2
Wrexham	5–2	5–0	1–2	2–0	6–4	2–2	1–3	5–0	5–0	0–2	4–1	3–2	2–2	5–2	0–0	4–4	4–1	1–1	1–1	2–3	1–0	3–0		1–1
York City	3–1	1–0	3–1	1–2	2–0	0–1	1–2	2–1	1–0	1–1	1–0	1–2	3–3	2–1	2–0	2–1	4–0	0–2	9–1	0–0	1–0	2–2	1–0	

Updated to match(es) played on unknown. Source: Ian Laschke: Rothmans Book of Football League Records 1888–89 to 1978–79. Macdonald and Jane’s, London & Sydney, 1980.
Legend: Blue = home team win; Yellow = draw; Red = away team win.

=== Maps ===
Locations of the Football League Third Division North teams 1956–1957

== Third Division South ==
Football League Third Division South
- Season: 1956–57
- Champions: Ipswich Town (2nd title)
- Failed re-election: none
- Matches: 552
- Goals: 1,760 (3.19 per match)
- Top goalscorer: Ted Phillips (Ipswich Town), 42

Pos	Team	Pld	W	D	L	GF	GA	GAv	Pts	Promotion or relegation
1	Ipswich Town (C, P)	46	25	9	12	101	54	1.870	59	Promotion to the Second Division
2	Torquay United	46	24	11	11	89	64	1.391	59	
3	Colchester United	46	22	14	10	84	56	1.500	58	
4	Southampton	46	22	10	14	76	52	1.462	54	
5	Bournemouth & Boscombe Athletic	46	19	14	13	88	62	1.419	52	
6	Brighton & Hove Albion	46	19	14	13	86	65	1.323	52	
7	Southend United	46	18	12	16	73	65	1.123	48	
8	Brentford	46	16	16	14	78	76	1.026	48	
9	Shrewsbury Town	46	15	18	13	72	79	0.911	48	
10	Queens Park Rangers	46	18	11	17	61	60	1.017	47	
11	Watford	46	18	10	18	72	75	0.960	46	
12	Newport County	46	16	13	17	65	62	1.048	45	
13	Reading	46	18	9	19	80	81	0.988	45	
14	Northampton Town	46	18	9	19	66	73	0.904	45	
15	Walsall	46	16	12	18	80	74	1.081	44	
16	Coventry City	46	16	12	18	74	84	0.881	44	
17	Millwall	46	16	12	18	64	84	0.762	44	
18	Plymouth Argyle	46	16	11	19	68	73	0.932	43	
19	Aldershot	46	15	12	19	79	92	0.859	42	
20	Crystal Palace	46	11	18	17	62	75	0.827	40	
21	Exeter City	46	12	13	21	61	79	0.772	37	
22	Gillingham	46	12	13	21	54	85	0.635	37	
23	Swindon Town	46	15	6	25	66	96	0.688	36	Re-elected
24	Norwich City	46	8	15	23	61	94	0.649	31	Re-elected

(C) Champions; (P) Promoted

=== Results ===
Home \ Away	ALD	B&BA	BRE	B&HA	COL	COV	CRY	EXE	GIL	IPS	MIL	NPC	NOR	NWC	PLY	QPR	REA	SHR	SOU	STD	SWI	TOR	WAL	WAT
Aldershot		3–2	0–2	1–4	2–1	0–1	2–1	1–4	0–0	3–1	3–0	3–1	4–0	0–0	0–2	4–2	1–4	1–1	1–1	5–3	2–2	0–1	4–1	3–1
Bournemouth & Boscombe Athletic	3–2		3–0	1–1	1–1	1–2	2–2	3–1	3–1	1–0	6–1	2–1	4–1	1–1	2–1	1–0	2–1	6–1	1–0	1–1	7–0	0–0	2–2	4–0
Brentford	2–2	2–2		2–5	1–1	1–1	1–1	3–0	3–2	1–1	5–0	0–0	2–1	1–1	4–1	2–0	4–0	3–1	4–0	3–2	4–1	0–0	6–2	1–5
Brighton & Hove Albion	2–2	2–2	1–2		0–0	2–1	1–1	3–0	3–1	3–2	3–2	2–0	5–0	3–0	3–1	1–0	8–3	4–3	1–0	1–1	2–0	6–0	1–3	2–2
Colchester United	1–1	3–0	1–0	0–0		3–2	3–3	4–0	0–0	0–0	2–1	1–0	5–1	1–1	2–1	1–1	3–2	6–0	3–1	3–2	1–1	2–1	2–1	2–0
Coventry City	5–1	4–2	1–1	1–2	2–4		3–3	1–0	4–1	1–1	1–2	2–0	3–1	3–2	1–4	5–1	0–1	3–3	2–1	2–0	3–0	3–2	2–2	0–2
Crystal Palace	2–1	1–1	0–2	2–2	2–4	1–1		0–0	1–2	1–3	2–2	2–1	1–1	4–1	2–1	2–1	1–1	0–1	1–2	2–0	0–0	1–1	3–0	0–0
Exeter City	1–1	1–2	1–1	1–3	0–2	4–2	2–1		4–0	1–2	1–1	2–0	0–0	0–0	2–1	0–0	1–1	5–1	0–4	6–1	3–2	1–1	0–1	1–2
Gillingham	6–2	1–0	2–1	0–0	1–2	1–2	4–1	2–1		1–1	1–3	1–1	1–2	1–1	0–3	0–1	0–0	1–1	0–0	0–2	3–0	1–1	2–1	0–3
Ipswich Town	4–1	1–0	4–0	4–0	3–1	4–0	4–2	3–0	1–1		0–2	5–0	0–1	3–1	2–1	4–0	4–2	5–1	2–0	3–3	4–1	6–0	2–2	4–1
Millwall	1–5	3–4	1–1	4–3	3–1	3–2	3–0	1–3	2–1	2–2		1–0	1–0	5–1	2–2	2–0	1–0	0–0	0–0	0–0	2–1	7–2	1–0	1–1
Newport County	3–0	5–3	3–0	0–0	1–0	3–0	2–2	1–1	4–0	1–0	0–0		3–0	3–1	4–1	1–1	1–2	2–0	2–3	2–1	2–1	3–0	2–2	3–0
Northampton Town	4–2	2–2	5–1	1–0	1–0	4–0	1–0	1–1	4–1	2–1	2–1	0–3		1–1	2–0	3–0	3–0	1–1	2–1	2–2	2–0	3–0	2–3	1–2
Norwich City	1–1	1–3	1–1	1–1	1–2	3–0	1–0	1–0	1–3	1–2	2–0	1–1	2–1		3–0	1–2	2–5	3–0	0–3	1–2	2–4	1–2	2–2	1–2
Plymouth Argyle	2–2	2–0	2–0	2–0	2–2	0–0	0–1	5–0	2–0	1–2	0–0	3–2	4–3	3–2		1–2	0–6	1–1	2–1	0–0	1–0	0–0	2–4	3–3
Queens Park Rangers	0–1	2–1	2–2	0–0	1–1	1–1	4–2	5–3	5–0	0–2	0–0	1–1	1–0	3–1	3–0		1–1	2–1	1–2	3–0	3–0	0–1	1–0	3–1
Reading	2–1	0–4	2–0	2–2	0–3	3–0	1–2	4–0	4–0	1–3	3–0	0–0	1–1	2–1	3–2	1–0		2–2	2–4	3–2	1–0	3–1	3–0	1–2
Shrewsbury Town	2–2	0–0	3–2	4–0	1–3	5–0	1–1	1–2	1–0	1–1	2–0	2–0	2–0	4–5	3–1	0–0	1–1		0–0	0–0	7–3	1–1	3–2	1–0
Southampton	1–0	3–0	3–3	1–0	2–1	1–1	3–0	2–2	0–1	0–2	4–0	3–0	2–0	2–0	2–2	1–2	4–1	4–0		1–2	2–1	1–0	3–1	3–1
Southend United	2–4	2–1	1–0	3–1	3–2	1–2	1–1	2–0	5–0	2–0	1–0	3–3	0–1	0–0	0–1	3–0	4–0	1–2	1–2		1–0	2–0	2–0	2–0
Swindon Town	1–2	2–1	1–3	3–0	4–1	2–2	3–1	3–5	2–3	3–1	1–0	1–0	4–0	1–1	0–3	1–0	3–2	1–2	0–0	3–2		1–2	1–2	2–0
Torquay United	4–2	1–0	2–0	1–0	4–2	3–1	3–0	1–0	3–3	4–1	7–2	4–0	2–0	7–1	1–1	3–0	3–1	1–1	2–0	3–3	7–0		2–0	3–0
Walsall	5–1	0–0	7–0	3–2	2–1	1–1	1–2	2–0	2–2	2–0	7–1	0–0	2–2	6–3	1–0	0–2	3–2	1–1	1–1	0–1	1–2	0–1		2–0
Watford	3–0	1–1	1–1	2–1	0–0	1–0	1–4	1–1	2–3	2–1	2–0	5–0	2–1	3–3	0–1	2–4	1–0	2–3	4–2	1–1	3–4	4–1	1–0	

Updated to match(es) played on unknown. Source: Ian Laschke: Rothmans Book of Football League Records 1888–89 to 1978–79. Macdonald and Jane’s, London & Sydney, 1980.
Legend: Blue = home team win; Yellow = draw; Red = away team win.

=== Maps ===
Locations of the Football League Third Division South London teams 1956–1957
Locations of the Football League Third Division South teams 1956–1957

== Attendances ==
=== First Division ===
#	Football club	Home games	Average attendance
1	Manchester United	21	45,481
2	Tottenham Hotspur	21	43,280
3	Arsenal FC	21	41,093
4	Sunderland AFC	21	36,145
5	Newcastle United	21	35,202
6	Everton FC	21	35,076
7	Wolverhampton Wanderers	21	34,956
8	Leeds United	21	32,672
9	Birmingham City	21	32,444
10	Chelsea FC	21	31,732
11	Aston Villa	21	30,487
12	Manchester City	21	30,005
13	Sheffield Wednesday	21	28,570
14	Bolton Wanderers	21	25,219
15	Portsmouth FC	21	25,024
16	Preston North End	21	23,522
17	West Bromwich Albion	21	22,746
18	Burnley FC	21	22,493
19	Blackpool FC	21	21,961
20	Cardiff City	21	20,550
21	Charlton Athletic	21	20,370
22	Luton Town	21	18,262

=== Second Division ===
#	Football club	Home games	Average attendance
1	Liverpool FC	21	35,743
2	Leicester City FC	21	30,624
3	Nottingham Forest FC	21	23,118
4	Blackburn Rovers FC	21	23,091
5	Bristol Rovers FC	21	22,166
6	Stoke City FC	21	22,146
7	Sheffield United FC	21	21,803
8	Bristol City FC	21	21,714
9	Middlesbrough FC	21	21,127
10	Fulham FC	21	20,920
11	West Ham United FC	21	18,667
12	Leyton Orient FC	21	17,524
13	Swansea City AFC	21	16,585
14	Notts County FC	21	15,638
15	Grimsby Town FC	21	15,331
16	Huddersfield Town AFC	21	14,861
17	Port Vale FC	21	14,046
18	Barnsley FC	21	12,915
19	Doncaster Rovers FC	21	12,375
20	Bury FC	21	11,986
21	Lincoln City FC	21	11,180
22	Rotherham United FC	21	10,744

== See also ==
- 1956-57 in English football
