= Ted Phillips (footballer) =

English footballer (1933–2018)

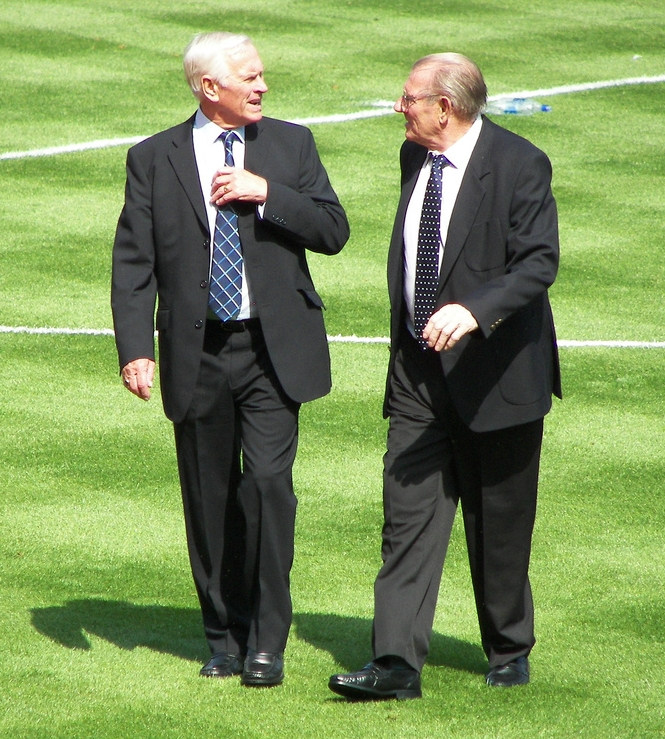
- Phillips (right) and former team-mate Ray Crawford at Portman Road

Personal information
- Full name: Edward John Phillips
- Date of birth: 21 August 1933
- Place of birth: Gromford, England
- Date of death: 9 January 2018 (aged 84)
- Position: Striker

Senior career*
Years	Team	Apps	(Gls)
- Leiston
1953–1964	Ipswich Town	269	(161)
1955–1956	→ Stowmarket (loan)		
1964–1965	Leyton Orient	36	(17)
1965	Luton Town	12	(8)
1965–1966	Colchester United	32	(13)
1966–1967	Floriana		
- Chelmsford City
- Long Melford
Total		349	(199)

Managerial career
- 1966–1967: Floriana
- * Club domestic league appearances and goals

Edward John Phillips (21 August 1933 – 9 January 2018) was an English professional footballer who played as a striker.

== Biography ==
Phillips was born in Gromford, Suffolk and started his football career at local club Leiston before joining the British Army. After leaving the army he was recommended to Ipswich Town by a scout and attended a trial at the club. The club offered Phillips a contract, but he initially refused to sign as he was earning more money as a gardener in Tunstall. The club later offered to pay transport expenses and a total wage of £8 a week, after which he signed for the club. After making his debut against Watford in March 1954, Phillips spent the 1955–56 season on loan to Stowmarket.

Phillips went on to make over 250 appearances for Ipswich between 1953 and 1964, scoring over 150 goals and making him the third highest scorer in the club's history. He also holds the record for the most goals scored for the club in one season with 46 in the 1956–57 season, a season in which he was also joint-highest scorer in the Third Division. He was selected to play for the Third Division South side against the North in April 1957. During his time at the club, he was renowned for having the hardest shot in 'modern football', a title given after trials involving Peter Lorimer, Bobby Charlton and Bobby Smith. In 1962, a report in the East Anglian Daily Times said of Phillips: "It is an undisputed fact that he is the best kicker of a dead ball in the game."

After leaving Ipswich in 1964, Phillips played for Luton Town, Leyton Orient and Colchester United. After leaving Colchester at the end of the 1965–66 season, he moved to Malta to become player-manager of Floriana, a club he had played against during Ipswich's 1962–63 European Cup campaign, scoring four goals in the two legs. during the 1966–67 season. Despite winning the Independence Cup and the Maltese FA Trophy, his first season at the club was not regarded as a success and he left midway through the 1967–68 season. After returning to England, he played non-League football for Chelmsford City and Long Melford.

Away from football he also played for Suffolk County Cricket Club.

Following his football career, Phillips worked for Pirelli Cables. He died on the morning of 9 January 2018 at the age of 84 after suffering from dementia.

== Honours ==
Ipswich Town

- Football League First Division: 1961–62
- Football League Second Division: 1960–61
- Football League Third Division South: 1956–57

Individual

- Ipswich Town Hall of Fame: Inducted 2007
