= 1962–63 Ipswich Town F.C. season =

Ipswich Town
1962–63 season
- Chairman: John Cobbold
- Manager: Alf Ramsey
- Football League First Division: 17th
- FA Charity Shield: Runners-up
- League Cup: Did not participate
- European Cup: First round
- FA Cup: Fourth round
- Top goalscorer: League: Ray Crawford (25); All: Ray Crawford (33)
- Highest home attendance: 25,468 v Wolverhampton Wanderers (Division One, 22 September 1962)
- Lowest home attendance: 14,063 v Liverpool (Division One, 5 March 1963)
- Average home league attendance: 19,044
Home colours

During the 1962–63 English football season, Ipswich Town F.C. competed in the Football League First Division. As defending league champions, they also participated in the European Cup, the club's first foray into European competition. Ipswich struggled badly to repeat the form of their title-winning campaign.

A 5–1 defeat to Tottenham Hotspur at Portman Road in the Charity Shield set the pattern as Ipswich spent most of the season fighting against relegation. They took just one point from their opening three league matches, just as they had done a year previously, but this time there was no upturn in form until a late rally (six wins and four draws from the final 12 matches) enabled them to finish in 17th place, four points clear of the drop zone.

Ipswich's European Cup campaign began in the preliminary round with a 14–1 aggregate win over Maltese champions Floriana, with Ray Crawford scoring seven goals across the two ties. In the first round, Ipswich faced Italian giants A.C. Milan and were unable to overturn a 3–0 defeat in the San Siro, despite winning the second leg 2–1 at Portman Road. Milan went on to win the trophy, beating Benfica in the final at Wembley.

On 25 October 1962, Ipswich manager Alf Ramsey agreed to take charge of the England national team, commencing 1 May 1963. His replacement was Newcastle United legend Jackie Milburn, who oversaw the final four matches of the season.

The Big Freeze of 1962–1963, was one of the coldest winters on record Football matches in the English leagues suffered because of the severe effects of the winter weather. Some matches in the FA Cup were rescheduled ten or more times. Matches in the fifth and sixth rounds, scheduled for 16 February and 9 March respectively, were played on 16 and 30 March. A board known as the Pools Panel was set up to adjudicate postponed matches to provide the football pool results. From 26 December to 23 February, Ipswich completed no league matches. The delays occurred before under-soil heating became widespread at major venues. When the thaw arrived, a backlog of fixtures had to be hastily determined. The Football League season was extended by four weeks from its original finishing date of 27 April. The final league fixtures took place one day before the rescheduled FA Cup final.

== Squad ==
Players who made one appearance or more for Ipswich Town F.C. during the 1962–63 season

Pos.	Nat.	Name	League		European Cup		FA Cup		Other		Total	
Pos.	Nat.	Name	Apps	Goals	Apps	Goals	Apps	Goals	Apps	Goals	Apps	Goals
GK	ENG	Roy Bailey	35	0	4	0	2	0	1	0	42	0
GK	ENG	Wilf Hall	7	0	0	0	0	0	0	0	7	0
DF	SCO	Billy Baxter	42	3	4	0	2	0	1	0	49	3
DF	ENG	Larry Carberry	29	0	2	0	2	0	1	0	34	0
DF	ENG	John Compton	34	0	3	0	2	0	1	0	40	0
DF	SCO	George Dougan	1	0	0	0	0	0	0	0	1	0
DF	ENG	John Laurel	1	0	0	0	1	0	0	0	2	0
DF	SCO	Ken Malcolm	21	0	3	0	0	0	0	0	24	0
DF	ENG	Andy Nelson	39	0	3	0	2	0	1	0	45	0
MF	SCO	Bobby Blackwood	19	4	4	1	2	1	0	0	25	6
MF	WAL	John Elsworthy	33	0	3	1	2	0	1	0	39	1
MF	SCO	Jimmy Leadbetter	35	2	1	0	2	3	1	0	39	5
MF	ENG	Reg Pickett	3	0	1	0	0	0	0	0	4	0
MF	ENG	Roy Stephenson	41	5	4	0	2	0	1	1	48	6
MF	ENG	Dennis Thrower	7	1	0	0	0	0	0	0	7	1
FW	ENG	Ray Crawford	42	25	4	8	2	0	1	0	49	33
FW	IRL	Dermot Curtis	6	0	0	0	0	0	0	0	6	0
FW	ENG	Doug Millward	3	0	0	0	0	0	0	0	3	0
FW	SCO	Doug Moran	32	9	4	2	0	0	1	0	37	11
FW	ENG	Ted Phillips	35	9	3	4	2	0	1	0	41	13

== League standings ==
Pos	Team	Pld	W	D	L	GF	GA	GAv	Pts	Qualification or relegation
15	Aston Villa	42	15	8	19	62	68	0.912	38	
16	Fulham	42	14	10	18	50	71	0.704	38	
17	Ipswich Town	42	12	11	19	59	78	0.756	35	
18	Bolton Wanderers	42	15	5	22	55	75	0.733	35	
19	Manchester United	42	12	10	20	67	81	0.827	34	Qualification for the European Cup Winners' Cup first round

Source: World Football
Rules for classification: 1) Points; 2) Goal average; 3) Goals scored

== Results ==
Home team listed first

=== Charity Shield ===
11 August 1962	Ipswich Town	1–5	Tottenham Hotspur	Ipswich
	Stephenson 84'		Greaves 37' 58'; Smith 42'; White 81'; Medwin 87'	Stadium: Portman Road; Attendance: 20,067

=== Division One ===
18 August 1962 1	Ipswich Town	3–3	Blackburn Rovers	Ipswich
	Moran 39'; Crawford 81' 86'		Craig 20' 46' 53'	Stadium: Portman Road; Attendance: 19,062

20 August 1962 2	Blackpool	1–0	Ipswich Town	Blackpool
	Horne 76'			Stadium: Bloomfield Road; Attendance: 23,305

25 August 1962 3	Sheffield United	2–1	Ipswich Town	Sheffield
	Pace 39'; Simpson 83'		Crawford 70'	Stadium: Bramall Lane; Attendance: 23,703

28 August 1962 4	Ipswich Town	5–2	Blackpool	Ipswich
	Phillips 20'; Moran 21'; Crawford 31' 60'; James (o.g.)		Durie 71'; Charnley 86' (pen.)	Stadium: Portman Road; Attendance: 21,294

1 September 1962 5	Ipswich Town	1–1	Nottingham Forest	Ipswich
	Leadbetter 39'		Addison 59'	Stadium: Portman Road; Attendance: 19,645

5 September 1962 6	Manchester City	2–1	Ipswich Town	Manchester
	Harley 32' 80'		Crawford 75'	Stadium: Maine Road; Attendance: 25,252

8 September 1962 7	Bolton Wanderers	1–3	Ipswich Town	Bolton
	Holden 10'		Crawford 59'; Thrower 65'; Moran 75'	Stadium: Burnden Park; Attendance: 17,790

11 September 1962 8	Ipswich Town	0–0	Manchester City	Ipswich
				Stadium: Portman Road; Attendance: 18,849

15 September 1962 9	Liverpool	1–1	Ipswich Town	Liverpool
	Hunt 19'		Crawford 66'	Stadium: Anfield; Attendance: 40,121

22 September 1962 10	Ipswich Town	2–3	Wolverhampton Wanderers	Ipswich
	Moran 2'; Crawford 16'		Hinton 11'; McParland 80' 81'	Stadium: Portman Road; Attendance: 25,468

29 September 1962 11	Aston Villa	4–2	Ipswich Town	Birmingham
	Wylie 2'; Thomson 20' 70'; Dougan 64'		Crawford 38' 88'	Stadium: Villa Park; Attendance: 31,860

6 October 1962 12	Ipswich Town	0–1	Leicester City	Ipswich
			McLintock 80'	Stadium: Portman Road; Attendance: 19,000

13 October 1962 13	Fulham	1–1	Ipswich Town	London
	Brown 65'		Baxter 6'	Stadium: Craven Cottage; Attendance: 22,966

20 October 1962 14	Ipswich Town	1–1	West Bromwich Albion	Ipswich
	Crawford 62'		Kevan 65'	Stadium: Portman Road; Attendance: 19,141

27 October 1962 15	Everton	3–1	Ipswich Town	Liverpool
	Vernon 24' (pen.); Morrissey 74' 75'		Moran 53'	Stadium: Goodison Park; Attendance: 39,692

3 November 1962 16	Ipswich Town	3–5	Manchester United	Ipswich
	Crawford 8'; Blackwood 47' 59'		Law 2' 14' 19' 85'; Herd 33'	Stadium: Portman Road; Attendance: 18,475

10 November 1962 17	Leyton Orient	1–2	Ipswich Town	London
	Gregory 15'		Blackwood 30'; Baxter 33'	Stadium: Brisbane Road; Attendance: 13,929

17 November 1962 18	Ipswich Town	1–5	Birmingham City	Ipswich
	Phillips 35'		Harris 15' 44'; Auld 16'; Leek 55' 88'	Stadium: Portman Road; Attendance: 16,775

24 November 1962 19	Arsenal	3–1	Ipswich Town	London
	Baker 5'; Armstrong 37'; Barnwell 44'		Blackwood 85'	Stadium: Highbury; Attendance: 25,038

1 December 1962 20	Ipswich Town	2–0	Sheffield Wednesday	Ipswich
	Crawford 5' 34'			Stadium: Portman Road; Attendance: 17,166

8 December 1962 21	Burnley	3–1	Ipswich Town	Burnley
	Lochhead 4'; Miller 68' 73'		Phillips 67'	Stadium: Turf Moor; Attendance: 19,498

15 December 1962 22	Blackburn Rovers	0–1	Ipswich Town	Blackburn
			Crawford 57'	Stadium: Ewood Park; Attendance: 8564

21 December 1962 23	Ipswich Town	1–0	Sheffield United	Ipswich
	Phillips 88'			Stadium: Portman Road; Attendance: 17,055

26 December 1962 24	Tottenham Hotspur	5–0	Ipswich Town	London
	Smith 3'; Jones 37'; Greaves 84' 86' 90'			Stadium: White Hart Lane; Attendance: 36,297

23 February 1963 25	Leicester City	3–0	Ipswich Town	Leicester
	Gibson 2'; Stringfellow 12'; Riley 67'			Stadium: Filbert Street; Attendance: 31,258

2 March 1963 26	Ipswich Town	0–1	Fulham	Ipswich
			Leggat 16'	Stadium: Portman Road; Attendance: 18,226

5 March 1963 27	Ipswich Town	2–2	Liverpool	Ipswich
	Phillips 29'; Stephenson 81'		Lewis 2'; St John 35'	Stadium: Portman Road; Attendance: 14,063

9 March 1963 28	West Bromwich Albion	6–1	Ipswich Town	West Bromwich
	Kevan 18' 44' 84'; Jackson 53'; Clark 70'; Smith 79'		Crawford 35'	Stadium: The Hawthorns; Attendance: 10,746

16 March 1963 29	Ipswich Town	2–4	Tottenham Hotspur	Ipswich
	Baxter 9'; Crawford 32'		Saul 11'; Greaves 20' 31' (pen.); Jones 83'	Stadium: Portman Road; Attendance: 23,679

19 March 1963 30	Ipswich Town	0–3	Everton	Ipswich
			Young 5' 70'; Elsworthy 65' (o.g.)	Stadium: Portman Road; Attendance: 19,712

23 March 1963 31	Manchester United	0–1	Ipswich Town	Manchester
			Leadbetter 31'	Stadium: Old Trafford; Attendance: 32,798

30 March 1963 32	Ipswich Town	1–1	Arsenal	Ipswich
	Phillips 68'		Thrower 17' (o.g.)	Stadium: Portman Road; Attendance: 16,686

6 April 1963 33	Birmingham City	0–1	Ipswich Town	Birmingham
			Stephenson 83'	Stadium: St Andrew's; Attendance: 17,013

12 April 1963 34	West Ham United	1–3	Ipswich Town	London
	Scott 8'		Moran 44'; Phillips 50'; Crawford 74'	Stadium: Upton Park; Attendance: 23,170

13 April 1963 35	Ipswich Town	1–1	Leyton Orient	Ipswich
	Moran 63'		Musgrove 42'	Stadium: Portman Road; Attendance: 18,677

15 April 1963 36	Ipswich Town	2–3	West Ham United	Ipswich
	Crawford 20'; Stephenson 51'		Brabrook 42'; Peters 52'; Hurst 73'	Stadium: Portman Road; Attendance: 21,988

20 April 1963 37	Sheffield Wednesday	0–3	Ipswich Town	Sheffield
			Crawford 4' 13' 88'	Stadium: Hillsborough; Attendance: 17,268

27 April 1963 38	Ipswich Town	2–1	Burnley	Ipswich
	Crawford 60'; Phillips 69'		Connelly 68'	Stadium: Portman Road; Attendance: 18,645

4 May 1963 39	Wolverhampton Wanderers	0–0	Ipswich Town	Wolverhampton
				Stadium: Molineux; Attendance: 15,832

10 May 1963 40	Nottingham Forest	2–1	Ipswich Town	Nottingham
	Julians 29'; Bailey 40' (o.g.)		Stephenson 10'	Stadium: City Ground; Attendance: 13,055

17 May 1963 41	Ipswich Town	4–1	Bolton Wanderers	Ipswich
	Stephenson 20'; Moran 48'; Crawford 51'; Phillips 56'		Davies 12'	Stadium: Portman Road; Attendance: 19,088

21 May 1963 42	Ipswich Town	1–1	Aston Villa	Ipswich
	Moran 37'		Thomson 69'	Stadium: Portman Road; Attendance: 17,230

=== European Cup ===
18 September 1962 R1, 1st Leg	Floriana	1–4	Ipswich Town	Gżira
	Demanuele 86'		Crawford 8' 48'; Phillips 36' 84'	Stadium: Empire Stadium; Attendance: 15,784

25 September 1962 R1, 2nd Leg	Ipswich Town	10–0	Floriana	Ipswich
	Moran 9' 52'; Phillips 15' 32' (pen.); Crawford 28' 39' 44' 62' 80'; Elsworthy 53'			Stadium: Portman Road; Attendance: 25,287

14 November 1962 R2, 1st Leg	A.C. Milan	3–0	Ipswich Town	Milan
	Barison 8' 14'; Sani 65'			Stadium: San Siro; Attendance: 7607

28 November 1962 R2, 2nd Leg	Ipswich Town	2–1	A.C. Milan	Ipswich
	Crawford 79'; Blackwood 84'		Barison 56'	Stadium: Portman Road; Attendance: 25,001

=== FA Cup ===
9 January 1963 R3	Mansfield Town	2–3	Ipswich Town	Mansfield
	Hall 38'; Askey 89'		Leadbetter 17' 62' 82'	Stadium: Field Mill; Attendance: 17,032

30 January 1963 R4	Leicester City	3–1	Ipswich Town	Leicester
	Cross 29'; Keyworth 40' 77'		Blackwood 28'	Stadium: Filbert Street; Attendance: 26,054
