= 1961–62 Ipswich Town F.C. season =

Ipswich Town
1961–62 season
- Chairman: John Cobbold
- Manager: Alf Ramsey
- Stadium: Portman Road
- Football League First Division: 1st
- FA Cup: Fourth round
- League Cup: Fourth round
- Top goalscorer: League: Ray Crawford (33); All: Ray Crawford (37)
- Highest home attendance: 30,649 vs Arsenal (Division One, 20 April 1962)
- Lowest home attendance: 11,010 v Swansea Town (League Cup second round replay, 24 October 1961)
- Average home league attendance: 22,835
Home colours

The 1961–62 season was the 73rd season of competitive football played by Ipswich Town. The club had been promoted the previous season as champions of the Second Division. They made a steady start to the league season, and were in twelfth place by the end of August, but slowly rose to compete with Burnley for the title. Going undefeated in February and March, the club were top of the league at the start of April. Burnley's poor form that month allowed Ipswich to take advantage and win the title with Burnley still left to play their final league fixture. It was the first time a club had won the championship at the first time of asking with the exception of Preston North End who had won the inaugural title in the 1888–89 season. Ray Crawford was the club's top scorer and equalled Derek Kevan of West Bromwich Albion as the league's top scorer with 33.

The club exited the FA Cup in the fourth round in a replay against lower league opposition in Norwich City, having played two replays against Luton Town the previous round. Similarly, Ipswich were sent out of the Football League Cup in the fourth round after losing heavily to Blackburn Rovers. As league champions, Ipswich qualified for European football for the first time in the club's history and participated in the 1962–63 European Cup where they lost to eventual winners AC Milan in the first round. The Ipswich manager Alf Ramsey left after the following season to become England national football team manager.

== Background ==
Ipswich went into the 1961–62 Football League, their 73rd competitive season, having been promoted from the Football League Second Division as champions, one point ahead of Sheffield United. It was Ipswich's first season in the top tier of English football in the club's history. Ray Crawford was the league's top scorer with 39 goals as Ipswich ended the season with 100 goals scored.

== Summary ==
=== League ===
==== August to October ====
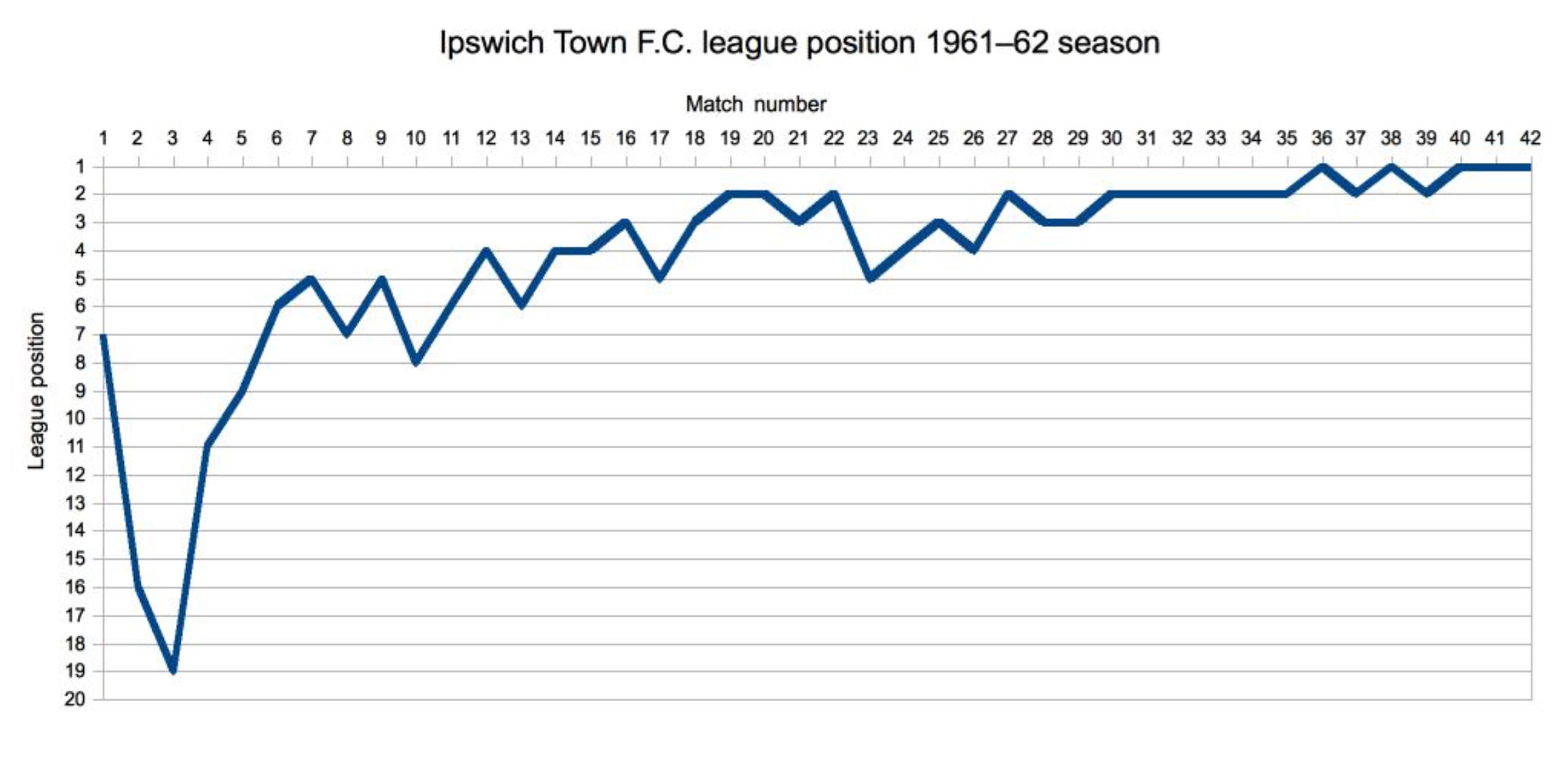
League position during the season

Ipswich's first ever match in the top flight was against Bolton Wanderers at Burnden Park on 19 August 1961. The match ended goalless and Eric Todd wrote in The Guardian that although Ipswich looked like Second Division champions "only on occasions", they were denied a late chance to win of which "Bolton could not have complained." Three days later, Ipswich made their first visit to Turf Moor where they lost 4–3 to Burnley after equalising three times, including two goals from Ted Phillips. Despite the defeat, Ramsey said it was the best performance he had seen from Ipswich since he had been connected with the club. In their first game of the season at Portman Road, two late goals by Peter Dobing secured a 4–2 victory for Manchester City on 26 August 1961. Journalist Clement Freud, writing in The Observer, noted that for half an hour of the match "Ipswich found their First Division feet." Ipswich then faced Burnley at home, winning 6–2 including a brace from Crawford, to record their first victory of the season, and ended the month in twelfth place in the league table.

September started with a trip to the Hawthorns where Ipswich faced West Bromwich Albion. Two goals from Doug Moran, one either side of a Crawford strike, saw the visitors secure a 3–1 victory. Three days later, and in front of 24,928 spectators, the highest attendance at Portman Road that season, Ipswich won 2–1 against Blackburn Rovers. A fourth consecutive victory followed as Ipswich beat Birmingham City 4–1 which included another brace from Phillips, one of which was a 25 yards (23 m) strike. After a mid-week League Cup victory over Manchester City, Ipswich faced Everton at Goodison Park: goalkeeper Wilf Hall stood in for injured Roy Bailey to make his debut in a First Division match. In blustery conditions, Derek Temple scored a hat-trick as Ipswich were beaten convincingly 5–2 with consolation goals from Phillips and Moran. Two days later, Ipswich travelled to Ewood Park and secured a late point with a 2–2 draw thanks to a 75th-minute goal from Phillips, his second of the match. The ball rebounded off his face after being punched clear by Blackburn's goalkeeper Brian Reeves. A 4–2 defeat by Fulham meant Ipswich had gone without a win in three games, but the final fixture of September saw them defeat Sheffield Wednesday at Hillsborough 4–1, with goals from Phillips (2), Crawford and Jimmy Leadbetter. Ipswich ended the month in sixth place in the league table, seven points behind leaders Burnley.

Ipswich's next league opposition was West Ham United who they faced on 7 October 1961 in front of 28,059 spectators, their largest ever league attendance at Portman Road. The home team won 4–2 with a second-half brace each from Phillips and Crawford. Tony Pawson, writing in the Daily Herald, praised Ipswich who "dominated [the] match by clever football". A 2–1 defeat at Sheffield United the week later was followed by a 3–2 victory at home over Tottenham Hotspur, a result described by John Arlott in The Observer as "the highest of the peaks of Ipswich Town's achievement". Cliff Jones scored twice for the League and FA Cup champions, but a second-half brace from Crawford ensured a win for Ipswich in front of yet another record Portman Road crowd. A week later, a trip to Bloomfield Road saw Ipswich end the month in fourth place in the league after a 1–1 draw, with a performance deemed "half-hearted" by the East Anglian Daily Times.

==== November to January ====
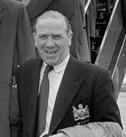
Manchester United manager Matt Busby complimented Ted Phillips' shooting ability.

Nottingham Forest were the next visitors to Portman Road on 4 November, and despite them having considerably more chances to score, a solitary effort from Phillips midway through the first half was sufficient for Ipswich to take both points. The following week saw Ipswich travel to Molineux where they faced Wolverhampton Wanderers. The visitors were down to ten men after just six minutes as Roy Stephenson was forced to withdraw following a thigh injury. Two late goals from Wolves, from Terry Wharton and Alan Hinton, resulted in a 2–0 defeat for Ipswich. Matt Busby's Manchester United were Ipswich's opponents at Portman Road on 18 November, with the home side winning 4–1 with goals from Phillips (2), Crawford and Elsworthy, and United's late consolation goal coming from Sammy McMillan. Both Busby and Ramsey acclaimed Phillips, the former suggesting that he had the "hardest and most accurate shot in the game at present" while the latter agreed: "Ted is the best shot of my time." The final game of November saw Ipswich visit Ninian Park where they faced Cardiff City. With a performance described in the East Anglian Daily Times as "deadly", "efficient" and "polished and planned", Ipswich won 3–0 with goals from Moran and Phillips (2). They finished the month in second place in the league, three points behind Burnley who had a game in hand, and a point ahead of West Ham United and Everton.

December started with the visit of Chelsea to Portman Road. Pawson in The Observer noted that Ipswich "held off Chelsea's determined challenge, and then casually crushed them" 5–2 with a hat-trick from Crawford supplemented by goals from Moran and Stephenson. A week later, Dennis Shaw of the Daily Herald described Ipswich as "the biggest disappointment of the season" as they lost 3–0 at Aston Villa, offering just two scoring attempts in the game. After losing to Blackburn in the League Cup midweek, Ipswich went into their next home league game against Bolton Wanderers after two consecutive defeats, a situation they had not been in since late August. Bolton took the lead through Doug Holden but two goals from Crawford in the last seven minutes secured a 2–1 victory for Ipswich who The Observer's Arlott described as making a "mockery of footballing justice — if it exists." Two days before Christmas, Ipswich travelled to Maine Road to face Manchester City on a frozen pitch. Although they had not won in eight games, City were 2–0 ahead by half time. Neil Young scored City's third and with Ipswich being denied a goal with numerous saves from Bert Trautmann, the match ended 3–0, inflicting Ipswich's third defeat in their last four games. The Boxing Day fixture saw Leicester City visit Portman Road for the first competitive fixture in the clubs' histories. Leadbetter missed his first match in 156 games with a knee injury. Crawford scored past Gordon Banks midway through the second half to secure the points for Ipswich. The return fixture, scheduled for 30 December at Filbert Street, was called off on the morning of the match due to a frozen pitch. Ipswich finished the year in fourth place, three points behind leaders Burnley who had two games in hand.

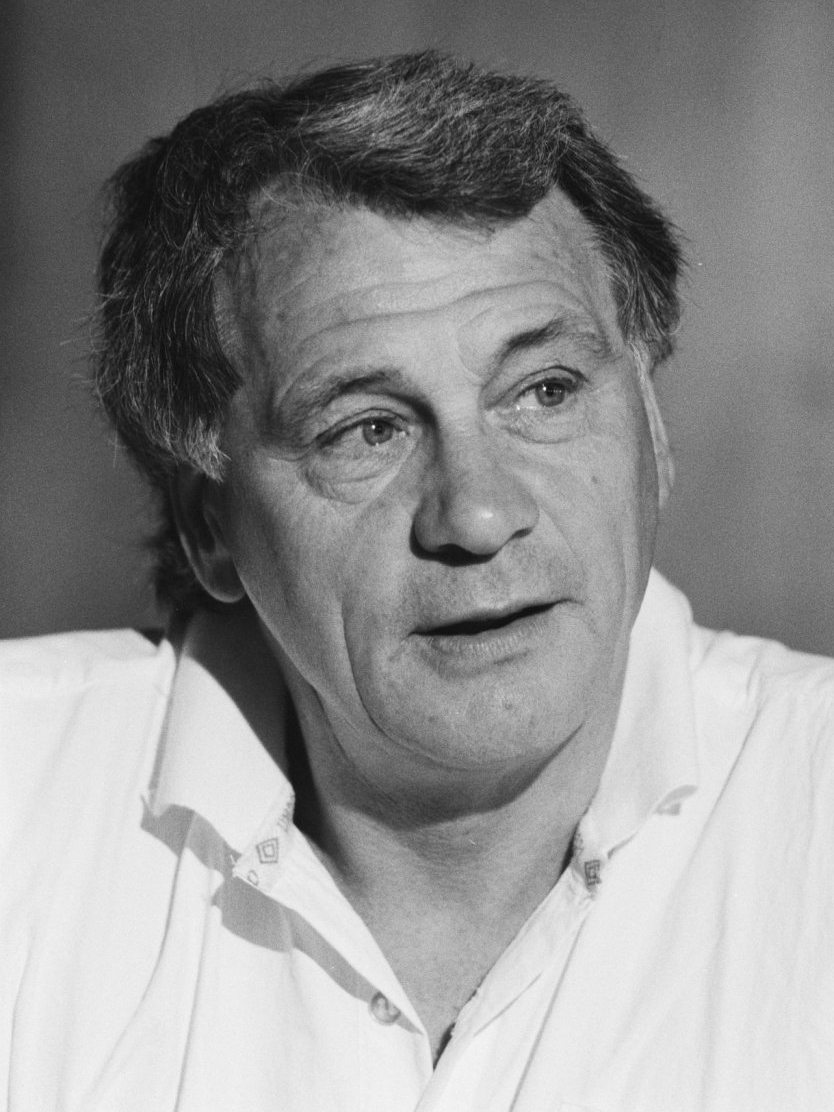
Future Ipswich manager Bobby Robson suffered defeat as a West Bromwich Albion player during the 1961–62 season.

Due to fixture congestion in the FA Cup, Ipswich played just two league matches during January 1962. The first took place on 13 January and saw West Bromwich Albion, whose team included England international and future Ipswich Town manager Bobby Robson, visit Portman Road. Goals from Stephenson, Moran and the fit-again Leadbetter secured a 3–0 win for the home side. The following week, Ipswich travelled to Birmingham where they faced Birmingham City at St Andrew's. The visitors were 2–0 down by half-time after a brace from Ken Leek. An own goal from Baxter put Birmingham three ahead; Crawford scored a consolation goal to end the match 3–1. The month ended with Ipswich once again in fourth position in the First Division, four points adrift of Burnley who still had two games in hand.

==== February to April ====
Knocked out of both the League and FA Cup by the end of January, Ipswich were left to fulfil their league fixtures which started with them hosting Everton on 3 February 1962. Stephenson dominated the inexperienced Colin Green and won corners from which Ipswich scored through a Phillips shot and a Moran header. Although Roy Vernon had scored for Everton, Ipswich's third goal came after Green fouled Stephenson, whose resulting free kick was converted by Elsworthy. Crawford made it 4–1 from a fine angle before Brian Harris scored a consolation, ending the match 4–2. The following week, Ipswich were at Craven Cottage where they faced Fulham. Alan Mullery put the home side ahead after 13 minutes as they dominated the early stages, but injuries to Graham Leggat and Johnny Haynes weakened the team allowing Ipswich to take advantage. Stephenson equalised and Crawford scored the winner with twelve minutes to go, with Ipswich taking the points with a 2–1 victory. After a two-week break, Ipswich faced West Ham United at the Boleyn Ground on 24 February. Described by Pawson in The Observer as a "curiously relaxed and gentle game", John Dick put the home side ahead before Leadbetter equalised with a rebound from a Crawford header which struck the West Ham crossbar. Bailey spilled Joe Kirkup's strike into his own net to give West Ham the lead once again before a penalty from Phillips secured a 2–2 draw. The month ended with Ipswich in third place in the First Division, four points behind Burnley who had a single game in hand.

March started with back-to-back games at Portman Road against opposition from Sheffield, the first of which was against Sheffield United who came into the match unbeaten in their last sixteen. Two goals in each half for Ipswich, including a brace for Crawford ensured a 4–0 win with the East Anglian Daily Times suggesting that United had lost their undefeated run "without a fight". Six days later, Ipswich faced Sheffield Wednesday, and were behind in seven minutes to a Colin Dobson goal. Crawford equalised and with two minutes remaining passed to Stephenson who scored to secure Ipswich's eleventh consecutive home league victory. On 14 March, Ipswich took on Tottenham Hotspur at White Hart Lane in front of a crowd of more than 50,000, and won 3–1 to become the first side to beat Tottenham home and away for three seasons. Crawford put Ipswich ahead but Jimmy Greaves soon equalised for Tottenham. Phillips made it 2–1 just before half-time and Crawford made it 3–1 for the win which Frank Taylor writing in the Daily Herald described as "the finest match [he had] seen all season." Three days later Ipswich hosted Blackpool at Portman Road. Crawford beat five defenders before passing to Moran who scored to make it 1–0 to the home side. Although it took until the 89th minute for Blackpool to equalise, and take a point from the match, Ipswich chairman John Cobbold admitted that the visitors were "unlucky not to take two points."

The following weekend saw Ipswich travel to the City Ground where they faced a Nottingham Forest side who had not lost a point to any of the top six sides during the season. In a game of many missed chances, Ipswich's lead through Moran was equalised just before half-time by Len Julians and the match ended 1–1. Four days later, Leicester City hosted Ipswich at a "slippery" Filbert Street. Crawford put the visitors ahead after just eight minutes and Stephenson doubled the lead early in the second half. The 2–0 victory saw Ipswich equal on points with Burnley at the top of the league albeit having played three more games. Ipswich's final game of March was at home against Wolverhampton Wanderers. Crawford opened the scoring from the penalty spot midway through the first half but Ron Flowers equalised five minutes later. Ipswich were 2–1 ahead when Crawford scored his second of the game, lobbing Malcolm Finlayson in the Wolverhampton goal. The visitors missed a number of chances before half time but were level soon after the break when Peter Broadbent scored. Wolves squandered further chances to score and with two minutes remaining, Moran scored Ipswich's third to claim a 3–2 victory. Ipswich had gone through February and March undefeated in the league and were top of the division, two points ahead of Burnley who had four games in hand.

Ipswich began April with a trip to Old Trafford where they faced Manchester United. A hat-trick from Albert Quixall and goals from Nobby Stiles and Maurice Setters saw United win 5–0. Bob Ferrier, writing in The Observer, suggested that United had overwhelmed Ipswich "so completely and so unexpectedly that it was well-nigh incredible." The following week, Ipswich hosted Cardiff City and secured a 1–0 win with an early goal from Moran. Two games in two days followed, over the Easter bank holiday, with Ipswich drawing the first 2–2 with Arsenal on Good Friday. In front of a record Portman Road crowd of 30,649, the visitors took a 2–0 lead through Johnny MacLeod and George Eastham. Phillips pulled one back from the penalty spot and Leadbetter equalised with five minutes remaining to secure the draw. The following day saw Ipswich travel to Stamford Bridge to take on Chelsea. First-half goals from Peter Brabrook and Barry Bridges were cancelled out in the second half by Crawford and a Phillips penalty, for Ipswich's second 2–2 draw in two days which consigned Chelsea to relegation. Championship rivals Burnley were still involved in the FA Cup and had won just one of their seven league fixtures in April by the end of Easter Saturday to lay second in the league, a point behind Ipswich but with a game in hand.

Ipswich's penultimate league fixture was against Arsenal at Highbury for which both Elsworthy and Moran required pain-killing injections to play. Despite early chances for the home side, Ipswich took the lead through Phillips in the 13th minute which Crawford doubled four minutes later. Eastham saw a goal disallowed before half time and Crawford scored his second and made it 3–0 to Ipswich. Burnley drew with Blackpool to leave Ipswich top of the league, two points clear but having played one more game than Burnley. The final game of Ipswich's season was at home against Aston Villa. After a goalless first half, Elsworthy's header struck the bar before Crawford scored from the rebound. He doubled the lead to secure a 2–0 win for Ipswich, and after news of Burnley's home draw with Chelsea, it was confirmed that Ipswich were league champions. The team were the first to win the First Division at their first attempt since the inaugural champions and The Invincibles of Preston North End in the 1888–89 season.

=== League Cup ===
Ipswich entered the 1961–62 League Cup in the first round where they faced Manchester City at Portman Road on 11 September 1961. Regular goalkeeper Bailey was sidelined with a thigh injury picked up in the previous match, so Hall came in to replace him. Six goals were scored in the twenty minutes either side of half-time and braces from both Moran and Phillips ensured a 4–2 victory for Ipswich. The second round saw them drawn against Welsh club Swansea Town away at the Vetch Field on 2 October. Swansea were 2–0 ahead in ten minutes after two own goals from Ipswich, but Phillips equalised with two minutes to go and forced the match to a replay. The match took place three weeks later, and despite having travelled 5,000 miles (8,000 km) over the preceding ten days, Swansea took a 2–0 lead midway through the first half. A penalty from Phillips made it 2–1 to the visitors at half-time and late goals from Stephenson and Moran secured a 3–2 win for Ipswich. They had recovered from a three-goal deficit twice to earn their passage to the third round. There they faced cup-holders Aston Villa at Villa Park. Cyril Chapman, writing in the Birmingham Daily Post, noted that Villa dominated "a most one-sided game" but in which Ipswich scored three times from their four shots, to win 3–2. Ipswich faced Blackburn Rovers in the fourth round, which was played at Ewood Park on 11 December 1961. Although the game was 1–1 at half time, with Ipswich's equaliser coming from a Phillips penalty, Blackburn scored three time in the second half to win the tie 4–1 and knock Ipswich out of the cup.

=== FA Cup ===
Ipswich entered the season's FA Cup in the third round where they were drawn at home on 6 January 1962 against Luton Town, a Second Division club who were eleventh in the league. Phillips opened the scoring in the second minute but Robin Chandler equalised for the visitors in the second half. According to Freud, Ipswich "deserved to lose" but the match ended 1–1 to send the tie to a replay, which took place the following Wednesday at Kenilworth Road. After a goalless 90 minutes, the replay went into extra time during which both teams scored, Elsworthy for Ipswich and Luton through Dave Pacey, and the game ended 1–1 again to force a second replay. The third clash between the clubs took place at Arsenal's home ground, Highbury, as a neutral venue. Within fifteen minutes of kick off, Ipswich were 3–0 ahead through Moran and Phillips (2), playing with the wind in their favour. Although Luton fought back and scored through Alec Ashworth, two late goals from Stephenson meant a 5–1 final score and finally saw Ipswich qualify for the fourth round.

Twelve days later, on 27 January, Ipswich faced Second Division team Norwich City, their East Anglian rivals at Carrow Road. After a goalless first half, Norwich took the lead through Terry Allcock but Leadbetter equalised five minutes later and the tie ended in a 1–1 draw, resulting in a replay at Portman Road on 30 January. Allcock once again put Norwich ahead in the first half but Crawford equalised soon after the break. With two minutes of the match remaining, Allcock scored his and Norwich's second, to win the match 2–1 and eliminate Ipswich from the competition.

== Players ==
During the season, 17 players represented Ipswich in the league, League Cup and FA Cup. Only defender Andy Nelson was ever-present, appearing in all 42 league games, and all five League Cup and FA Cup ties. Crawford was the top scorer with 37 goals, and shared the league top scorer title with Derek Kevan of West Bromwich Albion, both with 33. For Ipswich, Crawford was followed by Phillips on 36 and Moran on 18.

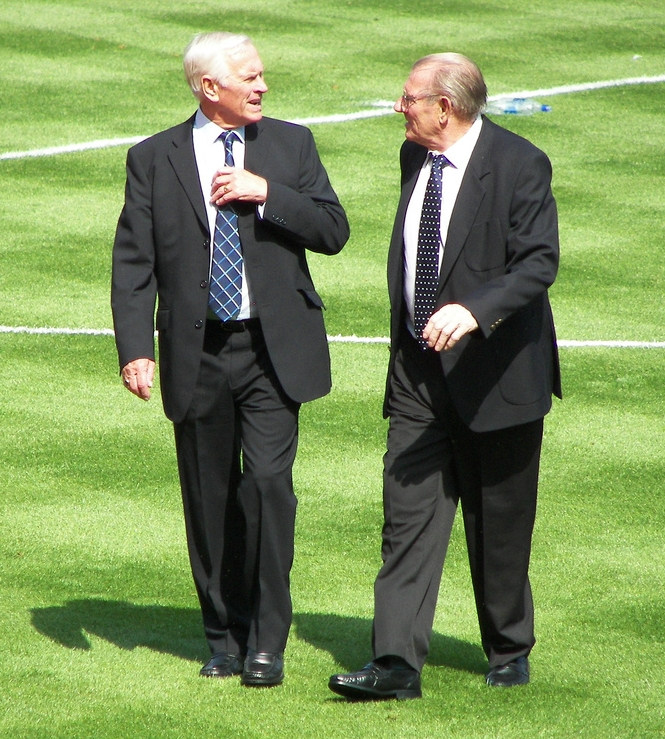
Crawford (left) and Phillips at Portman Road in 2007. They scored 73 goals between them throughout the 1961–62 season.

Players appearances and goals
Pos.	Nat.	Name	League		FA Cup		League Cup		Total	
Pos.	Nat.	Name	Apps	Goals	Apps	Goals	Apps	Goals	Apps	Goals
GK	ENG	Roy Bailey	37	0	4	0	3	0	44	0
GK	ENG	Wilf Hall	5	0	1	0	2	0	8	0
DF	SCO	Billy Baxter	40	0	5	0	5	0	50	0
DF	ENG	Larry Carberry	42	0	5	0	4	0	51	0
DF	ENG	John Compton	39	0	5	0	5	0	49	0
DF	SCO	Ken Malcolm	3	0	0	0	0	0	3	0
DF	ENG	Andy Nelson	42	0	5	0	5	0	52	0
MF	WAL	John Elsworthy	41	2	5	1	5	0	51	3
MF	SCO	Jimmy Leadbetter	41	8	3	1	5	1	49	10
MF	WAL	Aled Owen	1	0	2	0	1	0	4	0
MF	ENG	Reg Pickett	3	0	0	0	0	0	3	0
MF	ENG	Roy Stephenson	41	7	5	2	5	2	51	11
FW	ENG	Ray Crawford	41	33	5	1	4	3	50	37
FW	IRL	Dermot Curtis	4	0	0	0	1	0	5	0
FW	ENG	Doug Millward	0	0	0	0	1	0	1	0
FW	SCO	Doug Moran	42	14	5	1	4	3	51	18
FW	ENG	Ted Phillips	40	28	5	3	5	5	50	36

== Statistics ==
=== League ===
==== League table ====
Pos	Team	Pld	W	D	L	GF	GA	GAv	Pts	Qualification or relegation
1	Ipswich Town (C)	42	24	8	10	93	67	1.388	56	Qualification for the European Cup preliminary round
2	Burnley	42	21	11	10	101	67	1.507	53	
3	Tottenham Hotspur	42	21	10	11	88	69	1.275	52	Qualification for the European Cup Winners' Cup first round
4	Everton	42	20	11	11	88	54	1.630	51	Qualification for the Inter-Cities Fairs Cup first round
5	Sheffield United	42	19	9	14	61	69	0.884	47	

Source: World Football
Rules for classification: 1) Points; 2) Goal average; 3) Goals scored
(C) Champions

==== Results summary ====
Overall								Home						Away					
Pld	W	D	L	GF	GA	GD	Pts	W	D	L	GF	GA	GD	W	D	L	GF	GA	GD
42	24	8	10	93	67	+26	80	17	2	2	58	28	+30	7	6	8	35	39	−4

==== August ====
19 August 1961 1	Bolton Wanderers	0–0	Ipswich Town	Bolton
15:00 BST				Stadium: Burnden Park; Attendance: 16,708; Referee: F. Allott (Sheffield)

22 August 1961 2	Burnley	4–3	Ipswich Town	Burnley
19:30 BST	Pointer 23'; Harris 42'; Miller 64'; McIlroy 77'		Phillips 38' 73'; Crawford 52'	Stadium: Turf Moor; Attendance: 24,577; Referee: R. T. E. Langdale (Darlington)

26 August 1961 3	Ipswich Town	2–4	Manchester City	Ipswich
15:00 BST	Betts 34' (o.g.); Leadbetter 43'		Barlow 13'; Hayes 35'; Dobing 85' 86'	Stadium: Portman Road; Attendance: 21,473; Referee: M. A. Fussey (Retford)

29 August 1961 4	Ipswich Town	6–2	Burnley	Ipswich
19:30 BST	Crawford 3' 65'; Stephenson 12'; Moran 21'; Phillips 49'; Leadbetter 73'		McIlroy 11'; Elsworthy 86' (o.g.)	Stadium: Portman Road; Attendance: 23,835; Referee: K. Stokes (Newark)

==== September ====
2 September 1961 5	West Bromwich Albion	1–3	Ipswich Town	West Bromwich
15:00 BST	Jackson 62'		Moran 21' 88'; Crawford 42'	Stadium: The Hawthorns; Attendance: 19,016; Referee: G. McCabe (Sheffield)

5 September 1961 6	Ipswich Town	2–1	Blackburn Rovers	Ipswich
19:30 BST	Stephenson 13'; Phillips 22'		Douglas 41' (pen.)	Stadium: Portman Road; Attendance: 24,928; Referee: K. G. Aston (Ilford)

9 September 1961 7	Ipswich Town	4–1	Birmingham City	Ipswich
15:00 BST	Crawford 2'; Phillips 19' 54'; Moran 84'		Singer 12'	Stadium: Portman Road; Attendance: 20,017; Referee: M. A. L. Mason (Maidstone)

16 September 1961 8	Everton	5–2	Ipswich Town	Liverpool
15:00 BST	Temple 19' 31' 84'; Young 48'; Bingham 69'		Phillips 72'; Moran 77'	Stadium: Goodison Park; Attendance: 25,359; Referee: P. G. Brandwood (Barnsley)

18 September 1961 9	Blackburn Rovers	2–2	Ipswich Town	Blackburn
19:30 BST	Lawther 40'; McEvoy 73'		Phillips 13' (pen.) 79'	Stadium: Ewood Park; Attendance: 19,904; Referee: R. H. Windle (Chesterfield)

23 September 1961 10	Ipswich Town	2–4	Fulham	Ipswich
15:00 BST	Crawford 22' 70'		Cook 34'; Cohen 52'; Haynes 55'; O'Connell 72'	Stadium: Portman Road; Attendance: 23,050; Referee: J. E. Cooke (Waterbeach)

30 September 1961 11	Sheffield Wednesday	1–4	Ipswich Town	Sheffield
15:00 BST	Fantham 25'		Phillips 4' 63'; Crawford 15'; Leadbetter 35'	Stadium: Hillsborough Stadium; Attendance: 26,565; Referee: E. Norman (Blackpool)

==== October ====
7 October 1961 12	Ipswich Town	4–2	West Ham United	Ipswich
15:00 BST	Crawford 57' 67'; Phillips 65' 73'		Sealey 70'; Musgrove 87'	Stadium: Portman Road; Attendance: 28,059; Referee: P. G. Brandwood (Wolverhampton)

14 October 1961 13	Sheffield United	2–1	Ipswich Town	Sheffield
15:00 BST	Russell 12'; Pace 42'		Leadbetter 32'	Stadium: Bramall Lane; Attendance: 22,194; Referee: L. J. Hamer (Bolton)

21 October 1961 14	Ipswich Town	3–2	Tottenham Hotspur	Ipswich
15:00 BST	Phillips 37'; Crawford 54' 56'		Cliff Jones 21' 41'	Stadium: Portman Road; Attendance: 28,778; Referee: R. Tinkler (Boston)

28 October 1961 15	Blackpool	1–1	Ipswich Town	Blackpool
15:00 BST	Parry 82'		Phillips 32'	Stadium: Bloomfield Road; Attendance: 19,773; Referee: A. W. Luty (Leeds)

==== November ====
4 November 1961 16	Ipswich Town	1–0	Nottingham Forest	Ipswich
15:00 BST	Phillips 32'			Stadium: Portman Road; Attendance: 19,068; Referee: G. W. Pullin (Bristol)

11 November 1961 17	Wolverhampton Wanderers	2–0	Ipswich Town	Wolverhampton
15:00 BST	Wharton 69'; Hinton 83'			Stadium: Molineux Stadium; Attendance: 21,711; Referee: P. Bye (Bedford)

18 November 1961 18	Ipswich Town	4–1	Manchester United	Ipswich
15:00 BST	Phillips 25' 67'; Crawford 73'; Elsworthy 87'		McMillan 90'	Stadium: Portman Road; Attendance: 25,755; Referee: K. G. Aston (Ilford)

25 November 1961 19	Cardiff City	0–3	Ipswich Town	Cardiff
15:00 BST			Phillips 8' 86'; Moran 42'	Stadium: Ninian Park; Attendance: 22,823; Referee: J. Kelly (Chorley)

==== December ====
2 December 1961 20	Ipswich Town	5–2	Chelsea	Ipswich
15:00 BST	Crawford 4' 52' 74'; Moran 15'; Stephenson 77'		Tambling 5'; Murray 66'	Stadium: Portman Road; Attendance: 22,726; Referee: P. Bye (Bedford)

9 December 1961 21	Aston Villa	3–0	Ipswich Town	Birmingham
15:00 BST	McParland 24' 67'; Thomson 82'			Stadium: Villa Park; Attendance: 31,924; Referee: F. Cowan (Manchester)

16 December 1961 22	Ipswich Town	2–1	Bolton Wanderers	Ipswich
15:00 BST	Crawford 83' 88'		Holden 37'	Stadium: Portman Road; Attendance: 16,587; Referee: W. Clements (West Bromwich)

23 December 1961 23	Manchester City	3–0	Ipswich Town	Manchester
15:00 BST	Hayes 9'; Dobing 13'; Young 46'			Stadium: Maine Road; Attendance: 18,376; Referee: R. Langdale (Darlington)

26 December 1961 24	Ipswich Town	1–0	Leicester City	Ipswich
15:00 BST	Crawford 67'			Stadium: Portman Road; Attendance: 18,146; Referee: A. Holland (Barnsley)

==== January ====
13 January 1962 25	Ipswich Town	3–0	West Bromwich Albion	Ipswich
15:00 BST	Stephenson 16'; Moran 50'; Leadbetter 89'			Stadium: Portman Road; Attendance: 18,378; Referee: M. A. Fussey (Retford)

20 January 1962 26	Birmingham City	3–1	Ipswich Town	Birmingham
15:00 BST	Leek 10' 26'; Baxter 50' (o.g.)		Crawford 56'	Stadium: St Andrew's; Attendance: 26,968; Referee: S. Pickles (Stockport)

==== February ====
3 February 1962 27	Ipswich Town	4–2	Everton	Ipswich
15:00 BST	Phillips 6'; Moran 37'; Elsworthy 42'; Crawford 58'		Bingham 24'; Harris 89'	Stadium: Portman Road; Attendance: 22,572; Referee: H. Horner (Coventry)

10 February 1962 28	Fulham	1–2	Ipswich Town	London
15:00 BST	Mullery 13'		Stephenson 26'; Crawford 78'	Stadium: Craven Cottage; Attendance: 25,209; Referee: R. J. Leafe (Nottingham)

24 February 1962 29	West Ham United	2–2	Ipswich Town	London
15:00 BST	Dick 7'; Kirkup 47'		Leadbetter 20'; Phillips 78' (pen.)	Stadium: Boleyn Ground; Attendance: 27,763; Referee: P. G. Brandwood (Wolverhampton)

==== March ====
3 March 1962 30	Ipswich Town	4–0	Sheffield United	Ipswich
15:00 BST	Moran 14'; Leadbetter 25'; Crawford 58' 75'			Stadium: Portman Road; Attendance: 20,158; Referee: E. T. Jennings (Stourbridge)

9 March 1962 31	Ipswich Town	2–1	Sheffield Wednesday	Ipswich
19:30 BST	Crawford 29'; Stephenson 86'		Dobson 6'	Stadium: Portman Road; Attendance: 23,713; Referee: C. A. R. Roan (Reading)

14 March 1962 32	Tottenham Hotspur	1–3	Ipswich Town	London
19:30 BST	Greaves 9'		Crawford 8'; Phillips 41' 71'	Stadium: White Hart Lane; Attendance: 51,098; Referee: W. E. Haynes (Leicester)

17 March 1962 33	Ipswich Town	1–1	Blackpool	Ipswich
15:00 BST	Moran 14'		Charnley 89'	Stadium: Portman Road; Attendance: 22,450; Referee: G. McCabe (Sheffield)

24 March 1962 34	Nottingham Forest	1–1	Ipswich Town	Nottingham
15:00 BST	Julians 44'		Moran 18'	Stadium: City Ground; Attendance: 26,053; Referee: R. E. Smith (Newport)

28 March 1962 35	Leicester City	0–2	Ipswich Town	Leicester
19:30 BST			Crawford 8'; Stephenson 47'	Stadium: Filbert Street; Attendance: 19,068; Referee: K. A. Collinge (Altrincham)

31 March 1962 36	Ipswich Town	3–2	Wolverhampton Wanderers	Ipswich
15:00 BST	Phillips 20' (pen.); Crawford 32'; Moran 88'		Flowers 24'; McParland 59'	Stadium: Portman Road; Attendance: 22,153; Referee: S. Yates (Bristol)

==== April ====
7 April 1962 37	Manchester United	5–0	Ipswich Town	Manchester
15:00 BST	Quixall 14' 19' 50'; Stiles 84'; Setters 85'			Stadium: Old Trafford; Attendance: 24,976; Referee: R. J. Simons (Carlisle)

14 April 1962 38	Ipswich Town	1–0	Cardiff City	Ipswich
15:00 BST	Moran 24'			Stadium: Portman Road; Attendance: 17,693; Referee: J. R. Loynton (Solihull)

20 April 1962 39	Ipswich Town	2–2	Arsenal	Ipswich
15:00 BST	Phillips 64' (pen.); Leadbetter 85'		MacLeod 55'; Eastham 59'	Stadium: Portman Road; Attendance: 30,649; Referee: G. W. Grundy (Grimsby)

21 April 1962 40	Chelsea	2–2	Ipswich Town	London
15:00 BST	Brabrook 26'; Bridges 37'		Crawford 63'; Phillips 77' (pen.)	Stadium: Stamford Bridge; Attendance: 28,462; Referee: L. Hamer (Bolton)

23 April 1962 41	Arsenal	0–3	Ipswich Town	London
15:00 BST			Phillips 14'; Crawford 17' 80'	Stadium: Highbury; Attendance: 44,964; Referee: M. A. Holland (Barnsley)

28 April 1962 42	Ipswich Town	2–0	Aston Villa	Ipswich
15:00 BST	Crawford 72' 76'			Stadium: Portman Road; Attendance: 28,932; Referee: E. Crawford (Doncaster)

=== League Cup ===
11 September 1961 1	Ipswich Town	4–2	Manchester City	Ipswich
19:30 BST	Moran 29' 35'; Crawford 42' 64'		Betts 48' (pen.); Compton 56' (o.g.)	Stadium: Portman Road; Attendance: 14,919; Referee: P. Bye (Bedford)

3 October 1961 2	Swansea Town	3–3	Ipswich Town	Swansea
19:15 BST	Compton 2' (o.g.); Nelson 10' (o.g.); R. Davies 24'		Phillips 53'; Stephenson 65'; Crawford 87'	Stadium: Vetch Field; Attendance: 13,541; Referee: R. J. Leafe (Nottingham)

24 October 1961 2R	Ipswich Town	3–2	Swansea Town	Ipswich
19:30 BST	Phillips 38' (pen.); Moran 44'; Stephenson 80'		Hughes 14'; Reynolds 26'	Stadium: Portman Road; Attendance: 11,010; Referee: R. J. Leafe (Nottingham)

21 November 1961 3	Aston Villa	2–3	Ipswich Town	Birmingham
19:15 BST	Burrows 47' 75' (pen.)		Leadbetter 15'; Phillips 35' 77' (pen.)	Stadium: Villa Park; Attendance: 22,000; Referee: R. Tinkler (Boston)

11 December 1961 4	Blackburn Rovers	4–1	Ipswich Town	Blackburn
19:30 BST	Lawther 23'; Byrom 68'; Pickering 73' (pen.) 81'		Phillips 40' (pen.)	Stadium: Ewood Park; Attendance: 11,071; Referee: V. James (York)

=== FA Cup ===
6 January 1962 3	Ipswich Town	1–1	Luton Town	Ipswich
15:00 BST	Phillips 1'		Chandler 57'	Stadium: Portman Road; Attendance: 18,450; Referee: D. K. Dagnall (Bolton)

10 January 1962 3R	Luton Town	1–1 (aet)	Ipswich Town	Luton
19:15 BST	Pacey 76'		Elsworthy 16'	Stadium: Kenilworth Road; Attendance: 23,818; Referee: D. K. Dagnall (Bolton)

15 January 1962 3R2	Ipswich Town	5–1	Luton Town	London
19:30 BST	Moran 2'; Phillips 6' 16' (pen.); Stephenson 78' 88'		Ashworth 56'	Stadium: Highbury; Attendance: 29,438; Referee: R. H. Mann (Worcester)

27 January 1962 4	Norwich City	1–1	Ipswich Town	Norwich
15:00 BST	Allcock 48'		Leadbetter 53'	Stadium: Carrow Road; Attendance: 39,890; Referee: K. G. Aston (Ilford)

30 January 1962 4R	Ipswich Town	1–2	Norwich City	Ipswich
19:30 BST	Crawford 49'		Allcock 40' 88'	Stadium: Portman Road; Attendance: 29,796; Referee: K. G. Aston (Ilford)

== Post-season ==
Ipswich's title-winning season qualified them for the 1962–63 European Cup, the club's first foray into European football. They defeated Maltese champions Floriana 14–1 in the preliminary round, with Ray Crawford scoring seven across the two ties. Ipswich then faced Italians and eventual champions A.C. Milan. Ipswich were unable to overturn a 3–0 first leg defeat in the San Siro, despite winning 2–1 at Portman Road. On 25 October 1962, Ramsey agreed to take charge of the England national team, commencing 1 May 1963. Domestically, Ipswich struggled to repeat their form the following season, finishing 17th and four points above the relegation zone.
