= 1962 FA Charity Shield =

Football match

- Match programme cover
- Event: 40th FA Charity Shield
Ipswich Town	Tottenham Hotspur
1	5
- Date: 11 August 1962
- Venue: Portman Road, Ipswich
- Referee: Ken Dagnall (Bolton)
- Attendance: 20,067

The 1962 FA Charity Shield was the 40th FA Charity Shield, an annual football match played between the winners of the previous season's Football League and FA Cup competitions. The match took place on 11 August 1962 at Portman Road in Ipswich, and was played between 1961–62 Football League champions Ipswich Town and 1961–62 FA Cup winners Tottenham Hotspur. Watched by a crowd of 20,067, the match ended in a 5–1 victory for Tottenham Hotspur.

This was Ipswich's first appearance in the Charity Shield while Tottenham Hotspur were making their fourth, having last competed for the trophy the previous season. Tottenham's Jimmy Greaves opened the scoring and Bobby Smith doubled his team's advantage before half time. Greaves scored a second 13 minutes into the second half, and late goals from John White and Terry Medwin came either side of a Roy Stephenson consolation goal for Ipswich.

== Pre-match ==
The FA Charity Shield was founded in 1908 as a successor to the Sheriff of London Charity Shield. It was a contest between the respective champions of the Football League and Southern League, and then by 1913 teams of amateur and professional players. In 1921, it was played by the Football League champions and FA Cup winners for the first time.

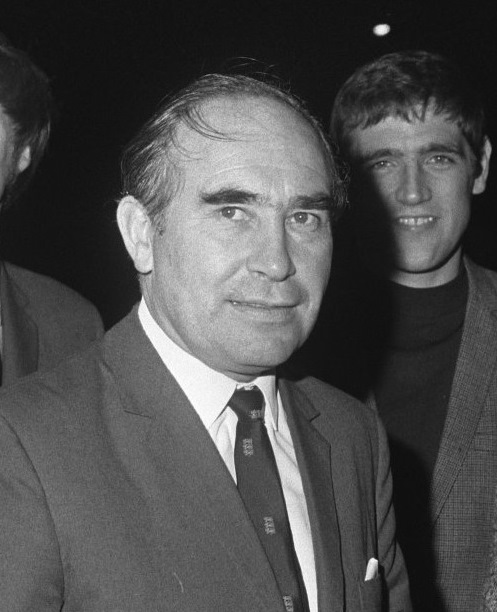
Alf Ramsey (pictured in 1969) was Ipswich manager and a former Tottenham player.

Ipswich had won the league in the previous season, three points clear of Burnley and losing just twice at home at Portman Road throughout the season. Despite being promoted from the Second Division the previous season, they went on to win back-to-back league titles. Ray Crawford was the previous season's league top scorer, with 33 goals in 41 matches. Ipswich were managed by former Tottenham player Alf Ramsey, and had defeated the London club twice in the league the previous season. Tottenham Hotspur had beaten Burnley 3–1 at Wembley in the FA Cup final three months earlier. The club finished third in the league, four points behind Ipswich. Jimmy Greaves was Tottenham's top scorer the previous season, scoring 29 goals in 28 games.

Ipswich had never featured in a Charity Shield match in their history. Tottenham had appeared four times, the most recent visit being in the previous year where they defeated a Football Association representative team 3–2. As of 2024, Ipswich have not played in a Charity Shield match since 1978 where they lost to Nottingham Forest 5–0, while Tottenham have competed for the title four times, losing once and sharing the trophy three times, most recently drawing 0–0 with London rivals Arsenal in the 1991 FA Charity Shield.

== Match ==
=== Summary ===
The match kicked off in sunny, breezy conditions, at 3 p.m. at Portman Road in front of a crowd of 20,067 and was refereed by Ken Dagnall. Ipswich were in charge early on in the match and saw an early chance from Crawford go wide as he failed to convert Jimmy Leadbetter's cross. Ipswich's Inside forwards were covering a lot of ground in both attack and defence, and this soon took its toll as Tottenham remained patient and took the lead through Greaves in the 36th minute. Peter Baker's pass to Bobby Smith was flicked into space for Greaves to run on and shoot past Ipswich's goalkeeper Roy Bailey. Five minutes later Smith's backheel from a Greaves pass deceived Ipswich defender Andy Nelson, and Smith doubled Tottenham's lead, who went in 2–0 at half-time. The second half saw Tottenham's veteran defensive midfielder Danny Blanchflower move up the pitch and provided space for his forwards, with John White's pass allowing Greaves to slip the ball past Bailey for 3–0. An injury to Ipswich defender Larry Carberry left the East Anglian club even weaker; Greaves beat five players only to slice his shot wide of the target after side-stepping Bailey. With less than ten minutes remaining, White headed in from a Terry Medwin pass. Roy Stephenson scored a late consolation goal for Ipswich but Medwin completed Tottenham's scoring, with a shot following a pass from Greaves to end the match 5–1.

=== Details ===
11 August 1962
15:00 UTC+1

Ipswich Town	1–5	Tottenham Hotspur
Stephenson 84'		Greaves 36', 58'; Smith 42'; White 81'; Medwin 87'

Portman Road, Ipswich
Attendance: 20,067
Referee: K. Dagnall (Bolton)

Ipswich Town	Tottenham Hotspur

Ipswich Town:
GK	1	(England) Roy Bailey
DF	2	(England) Larry Carberry
DF	3	(England) John Compton
DF	4	(Scotland) Billy Baxter
MF	5	(England) Andy Nelson (c)
MF	6	(Wales) John Elsworthy
MF	7	(England) Roy Stephenson
FW	8	(Scotland) Doug Moran
FW	9	(England) Ray Crawford
FW	10	(England) Ted Phillips
MF	11	(Scotland) Jimmy Leadbetter
Manager:
(England) Alf Ramsey

Tottenham Hotspur:
GK	1	(Scotland) Bill Brown
DF	2	(England) Peter Baker
DF	3	(England) Ron Henry
MF	4	(Northern Ireland) Danny Blanchflower (c)
DF	5	(England) Maurice Norman
MF	6	(Scotland) Dave Mackay
MF	7	(Wales) Terry Medwin
MF	8	(Scotland) John White
FW	9	(England) Bobby Smith
FW	10	(England) Jimmy Greaves
MF	11	(Wales) Cliff Jones
Manager:
(England) Bill Nicholson

== Post-match ==
The trophy was presented to the Tottenham captain Blanchflower by Graham Doggart, the chairman of the Football Association. Remarking on the willingness of the Tottenham players to move out of position, their manager Bill Nicholson said: "there is no guarantee we shall ever do the same thing twice or stick to any particular pattern". Ramsey was not unduly moved by the result, noting that new signing Bobby Blackwood had been left out as the Charity Shield was "an honour match for the team which won the championship last season".

Ipswich went on to finish 17th in the 1962–63 season while Tottenham finished runners-up behind Everton. Tottenham Hotspur were beaten in third round of the 1962–63 FA Cup by Burnley; Ipswich lost 3–1 to Leicester City in the fourth round.

== See also ==
- 1961–62 Football League
- 1961–62 FA Cup
