= Ipswich Town F.C. in European football =

English club in European football

- Club: Ipswich Town F.C.
- Seasons played: 12
- Most appearances: Mick Mills (40)
- Top scorer: John Wark (18)
- First entry: 1962–63 European Cup
- Latest entry: 2002–03 UEFA Cup

Titles
- Europa League: 1: 1981

Ipswich Town Football Club is an English professional association football club who have made numerous appearances in Union of European Football Associations (UEFA) and other European competitions since 1962. The first competitive venture in Europe came about as a result of Ipswich winning the First Division title in the 1961–62 season under their manager Sir Alf Ramsey. The club qualified for the European Cup where they faced amateur Maltese opposition in the first round before being sent out of the contest by Italian champions A.C. Milan in the following round. Under Bobby Robson's leadership, Ipswich qualified for European football for a decade from 1972, the culmination of which was victory in the final of the 1980–81 UEFA Cup, winning 5–4 on aggregate against Dutch team AZ Alkmaar. The club remains undefeated at home throughout their entire history in UEFA-sanctioned European football matches, having played 31 times, winning 25 and drawing 6.

Ipswich have also played in non-UEFA-sanctioned competitive European football. They participated in the Anglo-Italian Cup for a single season and won the Texaco Cup.

== History ==
=== Ramsey era ===
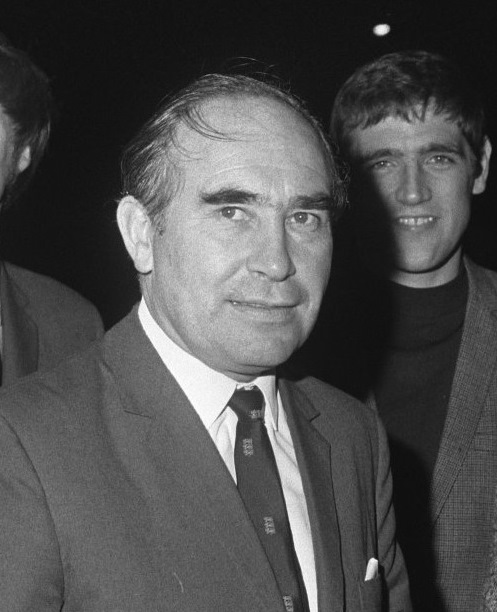
Alf Ramsey led Ipswich in their first season in Europe.

Ipswich's first appearance in European football came in the 1962–63 season. Under the management of Alf Ramsey, Ipswich had won back-to-back league titles and as such qualified for the 1962–63 European Cup in which they were drawn against Maltese club Floriana F.C. in the preliminary round. Ipswich dominated the first leg, played in Valletta, with two goals each from Ted Phillips and Ray Crawford in 4–1 victory. The return leg, a week later at Portman Road, ended in 10–0 victory to Ipswich, equalling European football record for both the highest individual match score. Crawford scored five and Phillips two, while the Floriana goalkeeper Mizzi blamed the results on having to play on a grass surface under floodlights. The 14–1 aggregate score also equalled the European record previously set by Red Star Belgrade in 1957.

The next round was a different proposition altogether, with Ipswich facing Italian champions A.C. Milan, who had won Serie A in the 1961–62 season. The first leg was played at the San Siro in front of just 7,600 supporters, and Milan's team included several Italian internationals such as Cesare Maldini, Gianni Rivera and Giovanni Trapattoni. Refereed by Gottfried Dienst (who would later officiate the 1966 FIFA World Cup Final), Milan took a 2–0 lead within a quarter of an hour with a brace from Paolo Barison. A third from Dino Sani in the second half condemned Ipswich to a 3–0 defeat. The second leg, at Portman Road two weeks later, saw Milan "shut up shop" and then Ipswich went a goal down to a "lucky" Barison strike. With the score 4–0 on aggregate, Ipswich played the remainder of the match with little caution; goals from Crawford and Bobby Blackwood gave them a 2–1 win on the night, though they lost 4–2 on aggregate. The Italians would go on to win the European Cup that season, with José Altafini setting a scoring record with fourteen goals in the competition.

=== Robson era ===
==== Return to Europe: 1972 to 1980 ====
It was eleven years before Ipswich ventured back into European football competition. Bobby Robson led the club to finish fourth in the First Division 1972–73 season and qualified for the 1973–74 UEFA Cup where their opponents in the first round were Spanish team Real Madrid. A deflected shot from Mick Mills proved to be the only goal of the game, marred by the referee being struck by a projectile from the crowd which had caused a two-minute delay.

The second leg in Madrid ended goalless allowing Ipswich to progress to the second round 1–0 on aggregate. The second round draw saw Ipswich face Italian team Lazio, the first leg to be played at Portman Road. Trevor Whymark scored four times, twice in each half, to enable Ipswich to take a 4–0 lead back to Rome. The return leg in the Stadio Olimpico was a bad-tempered affair. Despite taking an early two-goal lead, Lazio conceded a penalty with fifteen minutes remaining which Colin Viljoen converted; he was punched and kicked on his way to for the restart. Full beer cans were thrown from the crowd which were subsequently used by Lazio players as missiles against both the Ipswich players and the referee. Union Jacks were burnt by some members of the crowd. On the pitch, Lazio's Giorgio Chinaglia completed his hat-trick but a last-minute goal from David Johnson ended the leg 4–2, with Ipswich going through 6–4 on aggregate. At the final whistle, the Ipswich players sprinted off the pitch during which goalkeeper David Best was injured by the Lazio supporters. The team were locked in their dressing room for their own protection from the home supporters for more than an hour. Robson later remarked "Lazio were human beings gone berserk!"

Ipswich faced FC Twente of the Netherlands in the third round, winning the first leg on a frozen and snow-covered Portman Road pitch 1–0 courtesy of a late Whymark goal who tapped the ball into an empty net after Twente goalkeeper Piet Schrijvers palmed away a shot from Clive Woods. The return leg in Enschede ended 2–1 in Ipswich's favour, with second half goals from Bryan Hamilton and Peter Morris, the tie ending 3–1 on aggregate. Once again violence affected the game with Hamilton being punched to the ground out of the referee's vision, and four Ipswich fans requiring hospital treatment after clashing with Twente supporters.

The quarter final draw paired Ipswich with Lokomotive Leipzig. The first leg, played at Portman Road, ended 1–0 with a late goal from Kevin Beattie after Ipswich "had done everything but score". Robson noted that Leipzig should be happy with the result, suggesting "they were only just short of a thrashing". The second leg saw Mick Mills being sent off late in the first half for what he claimed to be a retaliatory foul on East German international player Wolfram Löwe. Five minutes into the second half, Peter Gießner scored from a Löwe corner, and the game ended 1–0, with an aggregate score of 1–1 sending the game into penalties. At 3–3, it was sudden death; Allan Hunter's penalty was then saved by Werner Friese, and Ipswich were out.

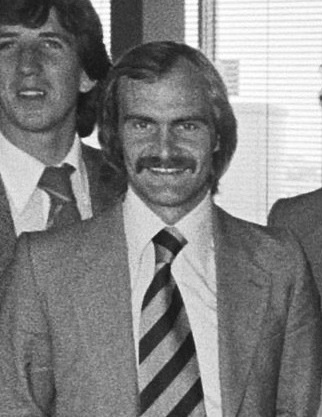
Mick Mills made more appearances (40) for Ipswich in European football than any other player.

Ipswich finished fourth in the 1973–74 Football League First Division, qualifying for the 1974–75 UEFA Cup, and were drawn against FC Twente in the first round. The first leg, at Portman Road, ended 2–2, with goals from Hamilton and Brian Talbot. Robson was upbeat, stating "we won over there last year and there is no reason why we can't do the same again". The return leg took place two weeks later in Enschede. Jaap Bos scored for Twente after eight minutes, but Hamilton equalised for Ipswich six minutes later; the game ended 1–1 and 3–3 on aggregate, which sent Ipswich out of the competition on the away goals rule.

Finishing third in the 1974–75 Football League First Division, Ipswich qualified for the 1975–76 UEFA Cup where they faced the favourites for the cup, Dutch club Feyenoord in the first round. The first leg, in Rotterdam, ended 2–1 to Ipswich with goals from Johnson and Whymark, the consolation for Feyenoord coming from Theo de Jong. Once again crowd trouble threatened, but the thousand "green-bereted commandos" in attendance helped to maintain order. Two weeks later at Portman Road, Ipswich took a two-goal first-half lead through Woods and Whymark, and held out against a "blitz of aggressive and elegant football" in the second half for a 4–1 aggregate victory. F.C. Bruges were to be Ipswich's second round opponent, with the first leg at Portman Road in October 1975. Despite starting without a number of first team regulars, Ipswich won the tie 3–0, with goals from Eric Gates, John Peddelty and Terry Austin. Bruges were 3–0 ahead by half-time in the second leg, through Raoul Lambert, Daniël De Cubber and Ulrik le Fevre. René Vandereycken scored the crucial fourth goal three minutes from time to make the aggregate score 4–3 and send Ipswich out of the cup.

Qualification for the 1977–78 UEFA Cup was ensured when Ipswich finished the 1976–77 season in third place, and they were drawn in the first round against Swedish amateur team Landskrona BoIS. The first leg, played in Sweden, ended 1–0 to Ipswich courtesy of a Whymark goal. He scored four more in the second leg, and a goal from Paul Mariner meant the final result was 5–0 and Ipswich progressed to the second round with a 6–0 aggregate win. The second round was against Las Palmas, with the first leg ending 1–0 at Portman Road through a Gates goal midway through the first half. Mariner scored two and Les Tibbott one in the second leg as the sides drew 3–3, ensuring Ipswich progressed to the third round to face Barcelona. The first leg, played at Portman Road, was a relatively one-sided affair, with Ipswich focused on closing down the creative midfielder Johan Cruyff. Three goals, from Gates, Whymark and Talbot, all from crosses made by Woods, ensured that Ipswich ran out 3–0 winners. In something of a repeat of the events in Bruges two years prior, Barcelona overcame the first leg deficit with two goals from Cruyff and a penalty from Carles Rexach making the aggregate score 3–3 and sending the game to a penalty shootout. Pedro Artola saved attempts from both Talbot and Hunter, and Ipswich were eliminated from the contest, losing 3–1.

There was domestic success for Ipswich in the 1977–78 English football season as they won the FA Cup Final against Arsenal to qualify for the 1978–79 European Cup Winners' Cup, their first appearance in the competition. The club was drawn against Dutch team AZ 67 Alkmaar in the two-legged first round. The first leg finished goalless, while the second leg ended 2–0 at Portman Road to Ipswich with an early goal from Paul Mariner and a late penalty from John Wark. The second round opponents were Austrian club FC Wacker Innsbruck who Ipswich faced at home in October 1978. A match which Ipswich dominated ended just 1–0 with the sole goal coming from a penalty converted by Wark. The second leg was a bad-tempered match, and after Innsbruck had equalised the tie, Mariner was sent off for a bad foul and four other Ipswich players were booked. With the tie 1–1 on aggregate, the match entered extra time, in which George Burley scored with ten minutes to go to seal Ipswich's passage to the third round where they would face Barcelona for the second year in Europe. Ipswich went into the match without regular forwards Mariner (through suspension) and Woods (through illness), but took the lead early in the second half with a goal from Gates. Barcelona responded immediately to equalise through Esteban Vigo before Gates scored his second to end the match 2–1 to Ipswich. The second leg, in the Camp Nou, was played in front a crowd of 110,000, and took receipts of £425,000 (equivalent to £2,323,000 in 2025) – a Spanish football record. A first half strike from Argentine Juan Carlos Heredia was the only goal of the game, and the tie ended 2–2 on aggregate, Ipswich going out to Barcelona again, this time on away goals.

A sixth-place finish in the 1978–79 season ensured that Ipswich qualified for European football once again, this time the 1979–80 UEFA Cup, where they were drawn against Norwegian part-time club Skeid Fotball in the first round. Ipswich were missing five regular players in the first leg, including Frans Thijssen and Alan Brazil, and went 1–0 down in the first half before goals from Mills, Robin Turner and Mariner settled the leg 3–1. The second leg at Portman Road was conclusive: goals from Arnold Mühren (2), Thijssen, Wark, Mariner and Steve McCall (2) secured a 7–0 win on the night and a 10–1 aggregate victory. Swiss team Grasshoppers were Ipswich's second round opponents, with the first leg ending goalless in Zürich. A first-half goal from Beattie was equalised by Claudio Sulser midway through the second half, ending the match and therefore the tie 1–1 and Ipswich were eliminated, once again on the away goals rule.

==== UEFA Cup success and beyond: 1980 to 1983 ====
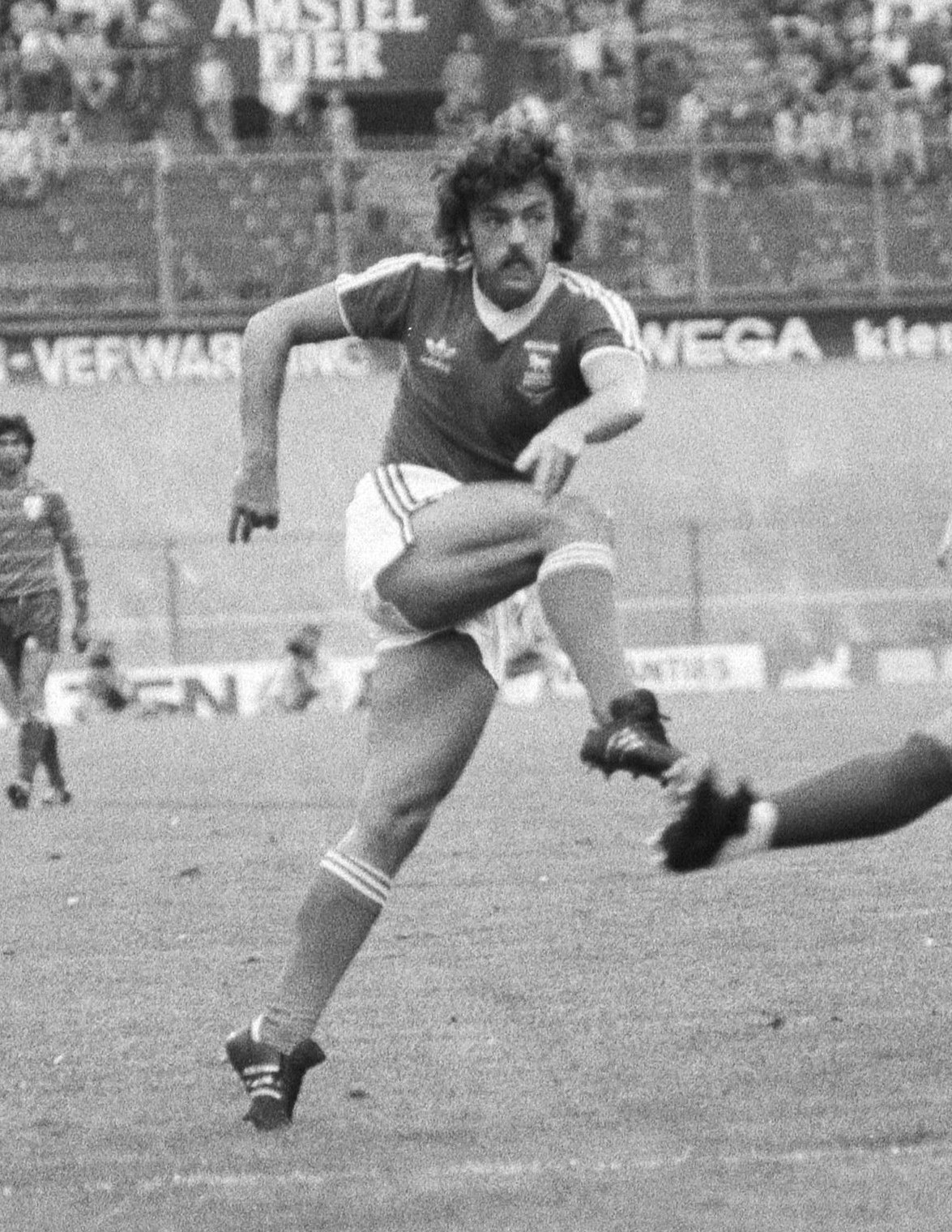
John Wark scored a record fourteen goals during Ipswich's 1980–81 UEFA Cup campaign.

Ipswich's 1980–81 UEFA Cup campaign commenced in the first round against Greek team Aris Salonika. The first leg, at Portman Road, was an ill-disciplined match which saw Aris' Giorgos Foiros sent off after a second yellow card towards the end of the first half. Ipswich were awarded three penalties, all of which were converted by John Wark, who also scored a fourth from open play. Aris also scored from the spot through Theodoros Pallas in what would be a consolation goal in a 5–1 win for Ipswich, described as a "sparkling" victory by the Belfast Telegraph. Two weeks later, Aris won 3–1 in the return leg, taking an early 2–0 lead before Gates pulled one back for Ipswich. Although Aris scored a third through midway through the second half, Ipswich progressed to the next round 6–4 on aggregate, where they faced Bohemians of Prague. A 3–0 home win saw Wark on target twice more, who was substituted off with a tendon injury, to be replaced by Kevin Beattie who scored a third for Ipswich with a free kick, described in The Times as a "thunderbolt".

The goal would prove to be pivotal as Ipswich, without regular goalkeeper Paul Cooper, midfielder Thijssen and striker Mariner, all through injury, lost the away leg 2–0 with goals from Antonín Panenka and Tibor Mičinec, but qualified for the third round 3–2 on aggregate. Three weeks later, Ipswich faced Widzew Łódź from Poland, who had defeated Manchester United and Juventus in previous rounds, at Portman Road. Wark once again found the net, scoring a hat-trick with goals from Alan Brazil and Paul Mariner completing a comprehensive 5–0 victory, the only negative being a trip to hospital for Mick Mills for 15 stitches in a cut to his shin. On a frozen pitch which many observers considered to be dangerous, Widzew Łódź won the away leg 1–0 with Marek Pięta scoring for the hosts but went out 5–1 on aggregate. The lead from the first leg allowed Robson to withdraw Mariner and Mühren, noting at the time that he was prioritising Ipswich's league challenge.

After a three-month break, Ipswich faced French team AS Saint-Étienne in the quarter-finals in March 1981, the first leg being held in the Stade Geoffroy-Guichard. Dutch player Johnny Rep put the away team in the lead after 16 minutes, but a brace from Mariner and goals from Arnold Mühren and John Wark ensured Ipswich took a 4–1 lead into the second leg. The victory against the French team has been described as one of the greatest performances in Ipswich's history, with Robson noting: "We have demolished a good side with one of the best victories anyone has achieved in Europe in the past 10 years". Ipswich won the game at Portman Road 3–1 with goals from Terry Butcher, Mariner and another penalty from Wark, while Saint-Étienne's consolation goal came from Jacques Zimako. Winning the tie 7–2 on aggregate, Ipswich progressed to the semi-finals where they met German side 1. FC Köln. Both legs finished 1–0 to Ipswich, Wark scoring again in the home leg, his 12th goal of the European campaign, with Butcher heading in a Thijssen free kick in Cologne. The 2–0 aggregate victory ensured that Ipswich qualified for their first (and as of 2023, their only) European cup final, where they would face Dutch team AZ Alkmaar.

The first leg of the 1981 UEFA Cup Final took place at Portman Road on 6 May 1981. Ipswich took the lead through Wark who scored from the penalty spot midway through the first half. It was Wark's 13th goal of the European campaign and in scoring it he ensured that he had scored in every round of the competition. The lead was doubled a minute into the second half, following a header from Dutchman Frans Thijssen. A third goal for Ipswich, this time from Paul Mariner, saw the English team win the game and take a 3–0 lead into the second leg at the Olympic Stadium in Amsterdam. Thijssen scored four minutes into the second leg, giving Ipswich a 4–0 aggregate lead, but Austrian striker Kurt Welzl pulled one back for AZ minutes later. AZ's Johnny Metgod and Pier Tol scored before half-time, sandwiching a Wark goal, to take the aggregate to 5–3. Jos Jonker scored AZ's fourth of the day with 16 minutes to go, but Ipswich held on to win 5–4 on aggregate. As Mühren, one of the two Dutchmen playing for Ipswich, later recalled, "Most teams would have given up, but AZ suddenly had wings ... AZ seemed possessed that night ... we really had to give all we had to reach the end, by the skin of our teeth – relieved and happy." Ipswich's defence of the UEFA Cup started in September 1981 against Alex Ferguson's Aberdeen. The first leg, ended 1–1 with Thijssen scoring for Ipswich and John Hewitt equalising. The second leg at Pittodrie saw both Gordon Strachan and John Wark score from the penalty spot before Peter Weir settled the tie with two goals. Ipswich went out of the cup 4–2 on aggregate. Ipswich finished the 1981–82 domestic season as runners-up and qualified for the 1982–83 UEFA Cup where they were drawn against A.S. Roma in the first leg. An own goal from Russell Osman and two goals from Roberto Pruzzo secured a 3–0 win for the Italians in Rome. Ipswich took a 2–0 lead in the second leg at Portman Road with goals from Gates and Steve McCall but a second-half strike from Aldo Maldera extended the Italians' lead to 4–2 on aggregate. Terry Butcher scored a third for Ipswich but the tie ended 3–1, with Ipswich going out of the competition 4–3 on aggregate. It would be 19 years before Ipswich made another appearance in European competition.

=== 21st century ===
Former player George Burley became Ipswich manager in December 1994 and led the club to promotion to the Premiership via the play-off final in 2000. Ipswich ended the 2000–01 FA Premier League in fifth place to qualify for the 2001–02 UEFA Cup. Their first round opponents were Torpedo Moscow, with the first leg being played at Portman Road. A mistake from young defender Titus Bramble allowed Dmitri Vyazmikin to put the Russians ahead early in the first half. Marcus Stewart missed a penalty after Pablo Couñago was adjudged to have been pulled down in the penalty area, but Bramble himself equalised the match with three minutes to go. The match ended 1–1 and Ipswich preserved their unbeaten home European record. The second leg was played at a nearly empty Luzhniki Stadium. Ipswich took the lead with a second-half goal from Nigerian Finidi George who also won a penalty, converted by Stewart, to put the English club 2–0 up. Torpedo scored a consolation goal through Dmitri Vyazmikin but the match ended 2–1 and Ipswich progressed to the second round winning 3–2 on aggregate.

Second round opponents Helsingborg of Sweden were dominant in the first leg at Portman Road but could not score, with the game finishing goalless. Burley thanked his goalkeeper Matteo Sereni for keeping Ipswich in the tie: "We were grateful to our goalkeeper – he made some quality saves". Helsingborg took an early lead in the second leg, Hans Eklund scoring after just eight minutes. In a game of many chances, Ipswich started the second half with urgency, and midway through Icelandic defender Hermann Hreiðarsson scored from a Mark Venus free kick. Twelve minutes later Stewart put Ipswich ahead, before he himself scored a second, chipping the Helsingborg goalkeeper, with two minutes to go. Ipswich won the match and the tie 3–1, and were drawn against Italians Inter Milan in the third round. The first leg, played at Portman Road in November 2001, ended 1–0 to Ipswich, with Alun Armstrong scoring the only goal of the game late in the second half, having been brought on as a substitute six minutes earlier. In the second leg, Inter's Christian Vieri, the then-world record holder for the highest transfer fee for striker, scored a hat-trick, helping to consign Ipswich to a 4–1 defeat on the night, and a 4–2 aggregate score.

Despite relegation from the Premiership, Ipswich qualified for the 2002–03 UEFA Cup through the Fair Play League, along with Czech team SK Sigma Olomouc. Ipswich played Luxembourg team FC Avenir Beggen in the qualifying round, the first leg saw 17-year-old Matt Richards play, becoming the youngest player to make his European debut in the club's history. A last-minute goal from Stewart sealed a 1–0 victory in Luxembourg. In the return leg, Ipswich dominated from the start. A hat-trick from Couñago, a brace from Tommy Miller and goals from Wayne Brown, John McGreal and Darren Ambrose, saw Ipswich end the match 8–1 winners and qualify for the next round 9–1 on aggregate. Ipswich were drawn against Yugoslavian club FK Sartid in the first round proper, where the first leg ended in a 1–1 draw at Portman Road with Armstrong equalising for the English side. The second leg was decided by a single goal: Marcus Bent scored from the penalty spot early in the first half to take Ipswich through to the second round 2–1 on aggregate. A few days later, following a 3–0 league defeat to Grimsby Town, Burley was sacked, and eventually replaced by Joe Royle whose first game in charge was the first leg of the second round of the UEFA Cup against Czech team Slovan Liberec at Portman Road. A second-half goal from Darren Bent was the only goal of the match, preserving Ipswich's unbeaten home record in European competition. The second leg at the Městský stadion in Ostrava was settled in the 87th minute when Liberec's Ghanaian striker Baffour Gyan scored with a header to take the tie to a penalty shootout. Finidi George and Jermaine Wright both saw their penalties saved by Czech goalkeeper Antonín Kinský as Ipswich lost 4–2 and went out of the competition.

== UEFA competition record by season ==
As of 2026, Ipswich Town are one of six English clubs to have won the UEFA Cup, now known as the UEFA Europa League, an achievement they accomplished in 1981. John Wark scored 14 goals in that run, equalling the long-standing scoring record in a European competition, set by José Altafini of A.C. Milan in the 1962–63 European Cup; the tally was exceeded by Jürgen Klinsmann who scored 15 in the 1995–96 UEFA Cup.

Ipswich Town's record in UEFA-sanctioned European competitions
Season	Competition	Round	Club	Home result	Away result	Aggregate	Notes
1962–63	European Cup	PR	(Malta) Floriana F.C.	10–0	4–1	14–1	(Note: Ipswich Town qualified for the 1962–63 European Cup by winning the 1961–62 First Division)
1962–63	European Cup	1R	(Italy) A.C. Milan	2–1	0–3	2–4	
1973–74	UEFA Cup	1R	(Spain) Real Madrid	1–0	0–0	1–0	(Note: Ipswich Town qualified for the 1973–74 UEFA Cup by finishing fourth in the 1972–73 First Division.)
1973–74	UEFA Cup	2R	(Italy) Lazio	4–0	2–4	6–4	
1973–74	UEFA Cup	3R	(Netherlands) FC Twente	1–0	2–1	3–1	
1973–74	UEFA Cup	QF	(East Germany) Lokomotive Leipzig	1–0	0–1	1–1 (3–4 p)	(Note: Ipswich Town lost 4–3 on penalties.)
1974–75	UEFA Cup	1R	(Netherlands) FC Twente	2–2	1–1	3–3 (a)	(Note: Ipswich Town qualified for the 1974–75 UEFA Cup by finishing fourth in the 1973–74 First Division.) (Note: Ipswich Town lost on the away goals rule.)
1975–76	UEFA Cup	1R	(Netherlands) Feyenoord	2–1	2–0	4–1	(Note: Ipswich Town qualified for the 1975–76 UEFA Cup by finishing third in the 1974–75 First Division.)
1975–76	UEFA Cup	2R	(Belgium) F.C. Bruges	3–0	0–4	3–4	
1977–78	UEFA Cup	1R	(Sweden) Landskrona BoIS	5–0	1–0	6–0	(Note: Ipswich Town qualified for the 1977–78 UEFA Cup by finishing third in the 1976–77 First Division.)
1977–78	UEFA Cup	2R	(Spain) Las Palmas	1–0	3–3	4–3	
1977–78	UEFA Cup	3R	(Spain) Barcelona	3–0	0–3	3–3 (1–3 p)	(Note: Ipswich Town lost 3–1 on penalties.)
1978–79	European Cup Winners' Cup	1R	(Netherlands) AZ 67 Alkmaar	2–0	0–0	2–0	(Note: Ipswich Town qualified for the 1978–79 European Cup Winners' Cup by winning the 1978 FA Cup.)
1978–79	European Cup Winners' Cup	2R	(Austria) SW Innsbruck	1–0	1–1	2–1	
1978–79	European Cup Winners' Cup	3R	(Spain) Barcelona	2–1	0–1	2–2 (a)	
1979–80	UEFA Cup	1R	(Norway) Skeid Oslo	7–0	3–1	10–1	(Note: Ipswich Town qualified for the 1979–80 UEFA Cup by finishing sixth in the 1978–79 First Division.)
1979–80	UEFA Cup	2R	(Switzerland) Grasshoppers	1–1	0–0	1–1 (a)	
1980–81	UEFA Cup	1R	(Greece) Aris Thessaloniki	5–1	1–3	6–4	(Note: Ipswich Town qualified for the 1980–81 UEFA Cup by finishing third in the 1979–80 First Division.)
1980–81	UEFA Cup	2R	(Czechoslovakia) Bohemians Prague	3–0	0–2	3–2	
1980–81	UEFA Cup	3R	(Poland) Widzew Łódź	5–0	0–1	5–1	
1980–81	UEFA Cup	QF	(France) Saint-Étienne	3–1	4–1	7–2	
1980–81	UEFA Cup	SF	(West Germany) FC Cologne	1–0	1–0	2–0	
1980–81	UEFA Cup	F	(Netherlands) AZ 67 Alkmaar	3–0	2–4	5–4	
1981–82	UEFA Cup	1R	(Scotland) Aberdeen	1–1	1–3	2–4	(Note: Ipswich Town qualified for the 1981–82 UEFA Cup by winning the 1981 UEFA Cup.)
1982–83	UEFA Cup	1R	(Italy) Roma	3–1	0–3	3–4	(Note: Ipswich Town qualified for the 1982–83 UEFA Cup by finishing second in the 1981–82 First Division.)
2001–02	UEFA Cup	1R	(Russia) Torpedo Moscow	1–1	2–1	3–2	(Note: Ipswich Town qualified for the 2001–02 UEFA Cup by finishing fifth in the 2000–01 Premier League.)
2001–02	UEFA Cup	2R	(Sweden) Helsingborg	0–0	3–1	3–1	
2001–02	UEFA Cup	3R	(Italy) Inter Milan	1–0	1–4	2–4	
2002–03	UEFA Cup	PR	(Luxembourg) Avenir Beggen	8–1	1–0	9–1	(Note: Ipswich Town qualified for the preliminary round of the 2002–03 UEFA Cup via the UEFA Fair Play ranking system.)
2002–03	UEFA Cup	1R	(Serbia) FK Smederevo	1–1	1–0	2–1	
2002–03	UEFA Cup	2R	(Czech Republic) Slovan Liberec	1–0	0–1	1–1 (2–4 p)	(Note: Ipswich lost 4–2 on penalties.)

Key

- PR = Preliminary round
- 1R = First round
- 2R = Second round
- 3R = Third round
- QF = Quarter final
- SF = Semi final
- F = Final

=== Record by UEFA competition ===
Competition	Played	Won	Drawn	Lost	Goals for	Goals against	Best performance
European Cup	4	3	0	1	16	5	Second round (1962–63)
European Cup Winners' Cup	6	3	2	1	6	3	Third round (1978–79)
UEFA Cup	52	30	10	12	98	53	Winners (1980–81)
Total	62	36	12	14	120	61	

=== Record by location ===
Ipswich's record at Portman Road is peerless in European football. For 45 years, Ipswich held the record for the longest unbeaten run of games at home in UEFA-sanctioned European competition. The team's absence from such tournaments in recent years had seen the record overtaken by AZ Alkmaar, whose home undefeated run was finally broken by Everton in 2007.

Location	Played	Won	Drawn	Lost	Goals for	Goals against
Portman Road	31	25	6	0	84	12
Away venues	31	11	6	14	36	49
Total	62	36	12	14	120	61

=== European attendance records ===
- Highest home attendance: 33,663 against Barcelona, 23 October 1977.
- Lowest home attendance: 13,440 against Skeid Oslo, 3 October 1979.
- Highest away attendance: 100,000 against Barcelona, 21 March 1979.
- Lowest away attendance: 2,971 against Avenir Beggen, 15 August 2002.

== Non-UEFA sanctioned European football ==
Ipswich Town participated in the non-UEFA-sanctioned Texaco Cup for a single season, in the 1972–73 competition, winning against local rivals Norwich City in the two-legged final. They also participated in the non-UEFA-sanctioned Anglo-Italian Cup for a single season, in their 1995–96 season.

Season	Competition	Round	Club	Country	H/A	Result
1972–73	Texaco Cup	R1 L1	St Johnstone	Scotland	H	4–2
1972–73	Texaco Cup	R1 L2	St Johnstone	Scotland	A	2–0
1972–73	Texaco Cup	QF L1	Wolverhampton Wanderers	England	H	2–1
1972–73	Texaco Cup	QF L2	Wolverhampton Wanderers	England	A	1–0
1972–73	Texaco Cup	SF L1	Newcastle United	England	A	1–1
1972–73	Texaco Cup	SF L2	Newcastle United	England	H	1–0
1972–73	Texaco Cup	F L1	Norwich City	England	H	2–1
1972–73	Texaco Cup	F L2	Norwich City	England	A	2–1
1995–96	Anglo-Italian Cup	Group	Reggiana	Italy	H	2–1
1995–96	Anglo-Italian Cup	Group	Brescia Calcio	Italy	A	2–2
1995–96	Anglo-Italian Cup	Group	Foggia	Italy	A	1–0
1995–96	Anglo-Italian Cup	Group	Salernitana	Italy	H	2–0
1995–96	Anglo-Italian Cup	SF	Port Vale	England	H	2–4

== Bibliography ==
- Houseley, David; Houseley, Philip (May 2011). On a European Journey with Ipswich Town in Europe 1962–2002. Pilgrim Book Services. ISBN 978-0-9532511-9-3.
