= List of Ipswich Town F.C. managers =

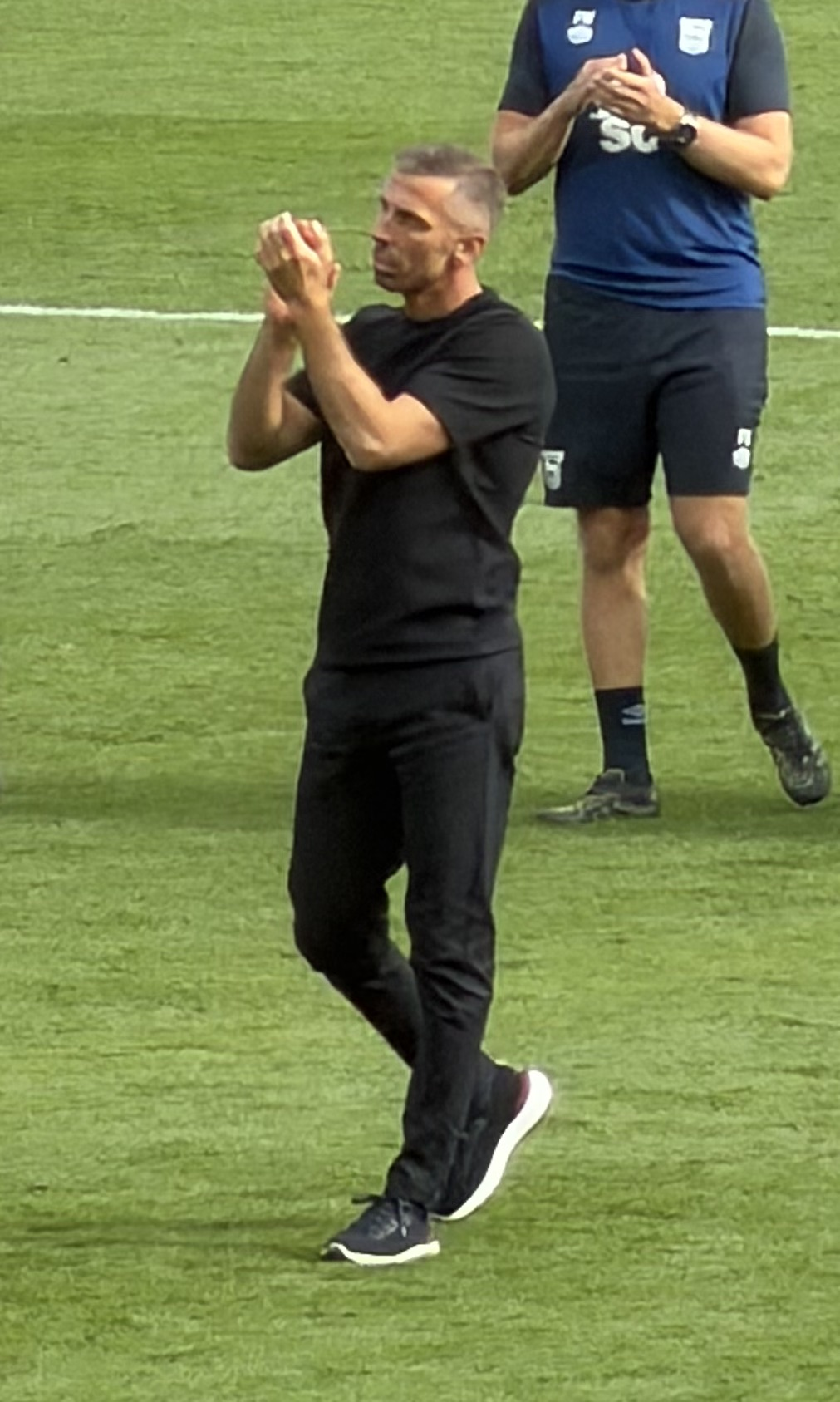
Gary O'Neil, the current manager of Ipswich Town.

From 1878 to 1936, Ipswich Town Football Club was an amateur side and the team was selected by committee. After turning professional in 1936, the club appointed Mick O'Brien as their manager who led them to immediate success in winning the Southern League. His sudden departure left the club managerless for 11 matches until Scott Duncan was placed in charge, remaining with the club for almost 18 years. Duncan retired in 1955 and was replaced by Alf Ramsey who led Ipswich to further success in the league. This included back-to-back league championships, winning the Second Division in the 1960–61 season followed by taking the First Division title in 1961–62 season. Ramsey was appointed England manager in 1963 and went on to win the 1966 World Cup.

Managerial turnover at Ipswich was low with only six full-time appointments in 46 years, but after Bobby Robson left the club in 1982 to manage England, the club employed six full-time managers in the following 25 years. David Sheepshanks became chairman of the club in 1995 taking over a club recently relegated from the Premier League and in financial difficulty. Under George Burley, the club failed in three play-offs before finally winning promotion back to the top flight in 2000 after a 4–2 win over Barnsley at Wembley Stadium. Relegation followed two seasons later after a brief spell in Europe and Burley was replaced by Joe Royle. After nearly four seasons, Royle left the club and in June 2006, Sheepshanks appointed former Ipswich player Jim Magilton as the manager of the team. Magilton was sacked nearly three years later after failing to lead the club to either play-offs or promotion. He was succeeded by Roy Keane, who became only the club's 13th full-time manager during their 74-year professional status. He was sacked on 7 January 2011 and was replaced by Ian McParland in a caretaker capacity before Paul Jewell took over as manager on 13 January 2011.

Jewell left the club by mutual consent in October 2012, with Ipswich bottom of the Championship, and leaving Chris Hutchings in a caretaker role. After a single match, Hutchings was replaced by Mick McCarthy on a full-time basis. On 29 March 2018, the club announced that Mick McCarthy's contract, which was due to expire at the end of the 2017–18 season, would not be extended. McCarthy announced that he was quitting during the post-match press conference following a 1–0 victory over Barnsley on 10 April 2018. He was replaced until the end of the season by Bryan Klug as a caretaker manager. On 30 May 2018, Paul Hurst was announced as manager; he and his assistant at Shrewsbury Town, Chris Doig, signed three-year contracts. Less than five months later, on 25 October 2018, Paul Hurst was sacked, with Ipswich having won one match from fourteen league games. Former Norwich City manager Paul Lambert was appointed two days later. Ipswich's relegation to the third tier of English football was confirmed on 13 April 2019, the first time since 1957. Lambert left the club by mutual consent on 28 February 2021. Paul Cook was appointed as manager three days later. Expectations were high ahead of the following season, but following a series of disappointing results, Cook was sacked in December 2021. On 16 December 2021, Kieran McKenna, assistant manager at Manchester United, was appointed to replace Cook, with Martyn Pert as his deputy.

Following promotion back to the Premier League, it was announced on 10 June 2026 that Kieran McKenna would step down as manager and football management as a whole to focus his time with his family. On 23 June 2026, Town announced the signing of Gary O'Neil from Ligue One side Strasbourg as the new manager on a 3 year deal.

== Managers ==
As of match played 21 November 2026. Only professional, competitive matches are counted.

Name	Nationality	From	To	Duration (days)	Matches	Won	Drawn	Lost	Win %	Honours
Mick O'Brien	Ireland	29 May 1936	11 August 1937	439	39	25	9	5	64.1	Southern League champions 1936–37
None	—	12 August 1937	11 November 1937	91	11	7	1	3	63.6	—
Scott Duncan	Scotland	12 November 1937	7 August 1955	6,487	505	205	113	187	40.6	Division Three (South) champions 1953–54
Alf Ramsey	England	8 August 1955	30 April 1963	2,822	369	176	75	118	47.7	Division Three (South) champions 1956–57; Division Two champions 1960–61; Division One champions 1961–62
Jackie Milburn	England	1 May 1963	8 September 1964	496	56	11	12	33	19.6	—
Jimmy Forsyth †	Scotland	9 September 1964	4 October 1964	25	7	2	2	3	28.6	—
Bill McGarry	England	5 October 1964	23 November 1968	1,510	196	80	62	54	40.8	Division Two champions 1967–68
Cyril Lea †	Wales	24 November 1968	12 January 1969	49	7	3	0	4	42.9	—
Bobby Robson	England	13 January 1969	18 August 1982	4,965	709	316	173	220	44.6	Texaco Cup winners 1972–73; FA Cup winners 1977–78; UEFA Cup winners 1980–81
Bobby Ferguson	England	19 August 1982	17 May 1987	1,732	258	97	61	100	37.6	—
John Duncan	Scotland	17 June 1987	5 May 1990	1,053	161	73	29	59	45.3	—
John Lyall	England	11 May 1990	5 December 1994	1,669	231	77	75	79	33.3	Division Two champions 1991–92
Paul Goddard † (Note: With John Wark)	England	6 December 1994	27 December 1994	21	4	0	2	2	0.0	—
George Burley	Scotland	28 December 1994	11 October 2002	2,844	413	188	96	129	45.5	Division One play-off winners 1999-2000
Tony Mowbray † (Note: With Bryan Klug)	England	11 October 2002	28 October 2002	17	4	1	1	2	25.0	—
Joe Royle	England	28 October 2002	11 May 2006	1,291	189	81	48	60	42.9	—
Jim Magilton	Northern Ireland	5 June 2006	22 April 2009	1,052	148	56	41	51	37.8	—
Roy Keane	Ireland	23 April 2009	7 January 2011	624	81	28	25	28	34.6	—
Ian McParland †	Scotland	7 January 2011	12 January 2011	5	2	1	0	1	50.0	—
Paul Jewell	England	13 January 2011	24 October 2012	650	85	29	18	38	34.1	—
Chris Hutchings †	England	24 October 2012	1 November 2012	8	1	0	0	1	0.0	—
Mick McCarthy	Ireland	1 November 2012	10 April 2018	1,986	279	105	78	96	37.6	—
Bryan Klug †	England	11 April 2018	29 May 2018	48	4	1	1	2	25.0	—
Paul Hurst	England	30 May 2018	25 October 2018	148	15	1	7	7	6.7	—
Bryan Klug †	England	25 October 2018	27 October 2018	2	1	0	0	1	0.0	—
Paul Lambert	Scotland	27 October 2018	28 February 2021	855	113	37	28	48	32.7	—
Matt Gill †	England	28 February 2021	2 March 2021	2	1	1	0	0	100.0	—
Paul Cook	England	2 March 2021	4 December 2021	277	44	13	17	14	29.5	—
John McGreal †	England	6 December 2021	16 December 2021	10	4	0	2	2	0.0	—
Kieran McKenna	Northern Ireland	16 December 2021	10 June 2026	1,801	222	105	63	54	47.3	EFL League One runners-up 2022-23; EFL Championship runners-up 2023-24, 2025-26
Gary O'Neil	England	23 June 2026	present	151	13	4	2	7	30.8	—

† Caretaker manager
