= 1972–73 Texaco Cup =

Tournament details
- Country: England; Scotland
- Teams: 16

Final positions
- Champions: Ipswich Town
- Runners-up: Norwich City

The 1972–73 Texaco Cup was the third edition of the tournament sponsored by Texaco. It was won by Ipswich Town, who beat Norwich City in a two-legged final by 4–2 on aggregate.

== First round 1st leg ==
Home team	Result	Away team	Date
Coventry City	3–3	Motherwell	12 September 1972
Ipswich Town	4–2	St Johnstone	12 September 1972
Wolverhampton Wanderers	5–1	Kilmarnock	12 September 1972
Ayr United	0–0	Newcastle United	13 September 1972
Dundee	2–1	Norwich City	13 September 1972
Hearts	1–0	Crystal Palace	13 September 1972
Leicester City	1–1	Dundee United	13 September 1972
Sheffield United	1–1	West Bromwich Albion	19 September 1972

== First round 2nd leg ==
Home team	Result	Away team	Date
Crystal Palace	0–1	Hearts	26 September 1972
Kilmarnock	0–0	Wolverhampton Wanderers	26 September 1972
West Bromwich Albion	1–0	Sheffield United	26 September 1972
Dundee United	2–2	Leicester City	27 September 1972
Motherwell	1–0	Coventry City	27 September 1972
Newcastle United	2–0	Ayr United	27 September 1972
Norwich City	2–0	Dundee	27 September 1972
St Johnstone	0–2	Ipswich Town	27 September 1972

== Quarter-finals 1st leg ==
Home team	Result	Away team	Date
Hearts	0–0	Motherwell	16 October 1972
Ipswich Town	2–1	Wolverhampton Wanderers	24 October 1972
Leicester City	2–0	Norwich City	24 October 1972
West Bromwich Albion	2–1	Newcastle United	25 October 1972

== Quarter-finals 2nd leg ==
Home team	Result	Away team	Date
Wolverhampton Wanderers	0–1	Ipswich Town	7 November 1972
Motherwell	4–2	Hearts	8 November 1972
Newcastle United	3–1	West Bromwich Albion	8 November 1972
Norwich City	2–0	Leicester City	8 November 1972

== Semi-finals 1st leg ==
Home team	Result	Away team	Date
Newcastle United	1–1	Ipswich Town	14 March 1973
Norwich City	2–0	Motherwell	14 March 1973

== Semi-finals 2nd leg ==
Home team	Result	Away team	Date
Motherwell	3–2	Norwich City	21 March 1973
Ipswich Town	1–0	Newcastle United	10 April 1973

== Final 1st leg ==
4 May 1973
19:30 BST

Ipswich Town	2–1	Norwich City
Peter Morris,		Clive Payne

Portman Road, Ipswich

== Final 2nd leg ==
7 May 1973
19:30 BST

Norwich City	1–2	Ipswich Town
David Cross		Trevor Whymark; Clive Woods

Carrow Road, Norwich
