= Wilf Hall =

English footballer

Personal information
- Full name: Wilfred Hall
- Date of birth: 14 October 1934
- Place of birth: Haydock, England
- Date of death: August 2007 (age 72)
- Position: Goalkeeper

Senior career*
Years	Team	Apps	(Gls)
- Earlestown
1954–1960	Stoke City	45	(0)
1960–1963	Ipswich Town	16	(0)
1964–1966	Macclesfield Town	98	(0)
1966–1968	Altrincham		
1968–1972	Macclesfield Town	19	(0)
Total		178	(0)
- * Club domestic league appearances and goals

Wilfred Hall (14 October 1934 – August 2007) was a footballer who played in the Football League for Ipswich Town and Stoke City.

== Career ==
Hall was born in Haydock, St. Helens and played football with Earlestown in the Lancashire Combination. He impressed scouts from Football League side Stoke City and he joined them for a small fee. He made his debut during Stoke's epic FA Cup third round tie against Bury. He played in all five matches against the "Shakers" in what is the longest cup match between two professional sides, in total it took 9 hours and 22 minutes before Stoke finally won.

During this time at Stoke Hall was used as back up to first choice Bill Robertson and only had a sustained run in the side in the 1957–58 season. He joined Ipswich Town in 1960 where he was again second choice this time to Roy Bailey. He left Ipswich in 1963 and went on to play for Macclesfield Town.

== Career statistics ==
Appearances and goals by club, season and competition
Club	Season	League			FA Cup		League Cup		Other		Total	
Club	Season	Division	Apps	Goals	Apps	Goals	Apps	Goals	Apps	Goals	Apps	Goals
Stoke City	1954–55	Second Division	1	0	5	0	—		—		6	0
Stoke City	1955–56	Second Division	6	0	0	0	—		—		6	0
Stoke City	1956–57	Second Division	0	0	0	0	—		—		0	0
Stoke City	1957–58	Second Division	24	0	5	0	—		—		29	0
Stoke City	1958–59	Second Division	11	0	2	0	—		—		13	0
Stoke City	1959–60	Second Division	3	0	0	0	—		—		3	0
Stoke City	Total		45	0	12	0	—		—		57	0
Ipswich Town	1960–61	Second Division	4	0	0	0	0	0	—		4	0
Ipswich Town	1961–62	First Division	5	0	1	0	2	0	—		8	0
Ipswich Town	1962–63	First Division	7	0	0	0	0	0	—		7	0
Ipswich Town	Total		16	0	1	0	2	0	—		19	0
Macclesfield Town	1963–64	Cheshire League	41	0	5	0	—		11	0	57	0
Macclesfield Town	1964–65	Cheshire League	37	0	5	0	—		5	0	47	0
Macclesfield Town	1965–66	Cheshire League	20	0	3	0	—		2	0	25	0
Macclesfield Town	1968–69	Northern Premier League	3	0	0	0	—		1	0	4	0
Macclesfield Town	1969–70	Northern Premier League	2	0	0	0	—		5	0	7	0
Macclesfield Town	1970–71	Northern Premier League	7	0	0	0	—		5	0	12	0
Macclesfield Town	1971–72	Northern Premier League	5	0	0	0	—		3	0	8	0
Macclesfield Town	1972–73	Northern Premier League	2	0	1	0	—		2	0	5	0
Macclesfield Town	Total		117	0	14	0	—		34	0	165	0
Career Total			178	0	27	0	2	0	34	0	241	0

== Honours ==
Ipswich Town

- Football League Second Division champions: 1960–61
