= Dennis Thrower =

English footballer (1938–2018)

Personal information
- Full name: Dennis Alan Thrower
- Date of birth: 1 August 1938
- Place of birth: Ipswich, England
- Date of death: 5 August 2018 (aged 80)
- Position: Wing-half

Youth career
- Landseer Old Boys

Senior career*
Years	Team	Apps	(Gls)
1956–1964	Ipswich Town	27	(2)
1965–	Bury Town		
Total		27	(2)
- * Club domestic league appearances and goals

Dennis Thrower (1 August 1938 – 6 August 2018) was an English professional footballer who played for Ipswich Town.

== Career ==
Thrower made his debut for his hometown club against Bournemouth in a 1–0 victory in August 1956 but had to wait until the 1962–63 season before making his second. He left the club in 1965 and joined nearby non-league team Bury Town. He also made appearances for Sudbury Town and Crane Sports, before managing Whitton United and Woodbridge Town. He also ran a plumbing business.

== Personal life ==
He had two children, Andrea and Gary.
