= Barrie Betts =

English footballer and manager (1932–2018)

Personal information
- Date of birth: 18 September 1932
- Place of birth: Barnsley, West Riding of Yorkshire, England
- Date of death: 17 November 2018 (aged 86)
- Position: Defender

Senior career*
Years	Team	Apps	(Gls)
1952–1957	Barnsley	55	(0)
1957–1960	Stockport County	112	(0)
1960–1964	Manchester City	101	(5)
1964–1965	Scunthorpe United	7	(0)

Managerial career
- 1970–1972: Lancaster City
- * Club domestic league appearances and goals

Barrie Betts (18 September 1932 – 17 November 2018) was an English professional footballer who played at centre back.

== Biography ==
He was born in Barnsley and transferred from Stockport County in 1960 to Manchester City with whom he stayed until 1964 before transferring to Scunthorpe United.

In this time at City he made 101 league appearances scoring five goals plus a further eight appearances in the FA Cup and eight League Cup appearances (scoring one goal).

He finished his career with non-league club Lancaster City. He managed the team between 1970 and 1972.
