= Bryan Klug =

English footballer and coach

Bryan Klüg
Personal information
- Full name: Bryan Paul Klug
- Date of birth: 8 October 1960 (age 66)
- Place of birth: Coventry, England
- Position: Midfielder

Team information
- Current team: Norwich City (Head of Coach Development)

Youth career
- 1977–1980: Ipswich Town

Senior career*
Years	Team	Apps	(Gls)
1980–1983	Ipswich Town	0	(0)
1980	→ Wimbledon (loan)	11	(0)
1983–1984	Chesterfield	34	(2)
1984–1985	Peterborough United	39	(2)
1988–1989	Sudbury Town		
1989	Chelmsford City	5	(0)
Total		89	(4)

International career
1978	England Youth	2	(0)

Managerial career
- 2002: Ipswich Town (caretaker)
- 2009: Ipswich Town (caretaker)
- 2018: Ipswich Town (caretaker)
- 2018: Ipswich Town (caretaker)
- * Club domestic league appearances and goals

Bryan Paul Klug (born 8 October 1960) is an English former professional footballer and coach. He is the Head of Coaching Development at the Norwich City. He played for England youth in 1978.

== Playing career ==
Born in Coventry, Klug began his football career as an apprentice with Ipswich Town. He made three appearance for the England Youth team in 1978. He joined Wimbledon on loan in March 1980 and made his Football League debut with them, although after returning to Ipswich in July 1980, he still did not make a first team appearance. Therefore, in August 1983 he moved to Chesterfield, finishing his Football League career with Peterborough United, before moving to non-league with Chelmsford City.

Klug played in the FA Vase final for Sudbury Town vs Tamworth in 1989, crossing for Dave Hubbick to head home after 7 minutes. The match ended 1–1.

== Coaching career ==
Klug returned to Ipswich as a youth-team coach in 1987. He worked his way up through the youth coaching system over a number of years, eventually becoming director of the newly formed academy at Ipswich in 1998. The Ipswich academy experienced years of success under Klug's management, producing a high number of first-team players graduating from the youth system, whilst also winning the FA Youth Cup in 2005.

Following the appointment of Jim Magilton as manager of Ipswich in the summer of 2006, Klug became Magilton's assistant. Working with the first-team alongside Magilton until 2009. In January 2009, Klug took on a new role as Head of Football Development, with him overseeing coaching development, scouting and fitness throughout the first-team and academy at Ipswich.

He took over as caretaker manager of Ipswich on 22 April 2009, following the sacking of Magilton. However, a day later, Roy Keane was appointed as manager.

In January 2010, it was announced that Klug had been sacked from the club after new manager Roy Keane decided to trim the staff at the club.

After leaving Ipswich, he joined the coaching set up at Tottenham Hotspur, overseeing the coaching of the Premier League side's academy schoolboys up to the age of 16. Klug worked his way up to become the assistant academy manager and head of player development at Tottenham. He left his role at the Tottenham academy in June 2012 to return to Ipswich to become the club's academy director.

Following the departure of Mick McCarthy towards the end of the 2017–18 season, Klug was made caretaker manager for the final four games. On 30 May 2018, Paul Hurst was announced as full-time manager, replacing Klug.

In October 2018 Klug was again made caretaker manager at Ipswich, following Hurst's sacking after Ipswich winning just once in 15 games.

== Personal life ==
In May 2013, Klug completed his seventh marathon, after running the Edinburgh Marathon, having also previously run the London and New York City marathons to raise money for local charities.

== Managerial statistics ==
As of match played 27 October 2018

Managerial record by team and tenure
Team	From	To	Record					Ref.
Team	From	To	P	W	D	L	Win %	Ref.
Ipswich Town (caretaker)	10 April 2018	30 May 2018	4	1	1	2	25.0	
Ipswich Town (caretaker)	25 October 2018	27 October 2018	1	0	0	1	0.0	
Total			5	1	1	3	20.0	—
