= Pat O'Connell (footballer) =

English footballer (born 1937)

Personal information
- Full name: Brian E. O'Connell
- Date of birth: 13 September 1937 (age 89)
- Place of birth: Kensington, London, England
- Position: Winger

Senior career*
Years	Team	Apps	(Gls)
1958–1966	Fulham	156	(26)
1966–1967	Crystal Palace	21	(2)
1968	Vancouver Royals	27	(6)

Managerial career
- 1973–1982: Epsom & Ewell
- * Club domestic league appearances and goals

Brian E. "Pat" O'Connell (born 13 September 1937) is an English former footballer who played as a half back or winger. He started his career as a junior at Fulham, for whom he made his professional debut in 1958. He spent eight years at Fulham, playing 156 league matches and scoring 26 goals. He moved to Crystal Palace in 1966, where he played for a single season, making 21 appearances in the league and scoring 2 goals. In 1968, he moved to Canada to play for Vancouver Royals.

After his playing career he went on to manage Epsom & Ewell from 1973 until 1982. During his time there he went on to win the Surrey Senior League, division two of the Isthmian League and took the club to the first final of the FA Vase.
