= 1962–63 in English football =

Football in England
- Season: 1962–63

Men's football
- First Division: Everton
- Second Division: Stoke City
- Third Division: Northampton Town
- Fourth Division: Brentford
- FA Cup: Manchester United
- League Cup: Birmingham City
- Charity Shield: Tottenham Hotspur

The 1962–63 season was the 83rd season of competitive football in England.

== Overview ==
Everton won the League Championship, their first post-war title. Manchester United won the FA Cup, their first major trophy since the Munich air disaster in 1958. Birmingham City won the League Cup. Tottenham Hotspur won the European Cup Winners' Cup, thereby becoming the first English side to win a European cup competition. Oxford United were elected to the Football League to replace the defunct Accrington Stanley, who had resigned from the league the previous season. Much of the season was postponed for several months because of the Big Freeze of 1963.

== Diary of the season ==
3 October 1962: The England national football team competes in the European Football Championships for the first time, beginning the qualifiers for the 1964 European Nations' Cup with a 1–1 draw against France in the qualifying round first leg at Hillsborough. Ron Flowers of Wolverhampton Wanderers scores England's only goal.

25 October 1962: Alf Ramsey, the Ipswich Town manager, accepts The Football Association's offer to succeed Walter Winterbottom as England manager with effect from 1 May 1963, after agreeing taking charge of two earlier matches from 27 February 1963.

5 January 1963: The Big Freeze of 1963 impacts the third round of the FA Cup with only 3 of 32 fixtures played.

12 January 1963: Only eight League fixtures are played due to the bad weather.

23 January 1963: The Pools Panel is used to forecast the results of postponed matches for the first time.

26 January 1963: Only one fixture of the fourth round of the FA Cup is played as most of the third round ties have not been completed.

28 January 1963: FA Cup fifth round draw is postponed for a week.

2 February 1963: Only five League fixtures are played due to the bad weather.

4 February 1963: The FA postpone the fifth and sixth rounds of the FA Cup for a week.

9 February 1963: Only seven League fixtures are played due to the bad weather.

12 February 1963: The FA postpone the fifth and sixth rounds of the FA Cup further.

18 February 1963: The FA Cup semi-finals are postponed four weeks and the final three weeks.

27 February 1963: England are knocked out of the European Nations' Cup with a 5–2 defeat to France in Paris in the second leg of the qualifying round.

7 March 1963: Bradford City finally play their third round FA Cup tie against Newcastle United, losing 6–1.

11 March 1963: Middlesbrough beat Blackburn Rovers 3–1 to become the last team into the fourth round of the FA Cup.

16 March 1963: The fifth round of the FA Cup is finally played.

4 May 1963: English Double-chasing Leicester City are beaten by West Bromwich Albion in the top-flight, while Leyton Orient's defeat at Hillsborough Stadium leaves the East Londoners "practically doomed to relegation". In the Second Division, table-topping Stoke City were beaten by Scunthorpe United, and a hat-trick from Irishman Johnny Crossan features in Sunderland's 4–0 home victory over Southampton. Leaders of the Fourth Division Brentford rack up their 26th league win of the season against Chesterfield, and move two points clear of Oldham Athletic, in second, with two games in hand. Outside of the League, Wimbledon win the FA Amateur Cup with victory over Sutton United in the Final.

11 May 1963: Everton seal the First Division title with a 4–1 home win over Fulham on the final day of the league season.

15 May 1963: Tottenham Hotspur become the first British club to win a European trophy, defeating Atlético Madrid 5–1 in the European Cup Winners' Cup Final in Rotterdam. Jimmy Greaves and Terry Dyson score twice each, with the other goal coming from John White.

18 May 1963: Stoke secure the Second Division Championship with a win over Luton Town, while Sunderland in second leave the door open for third-placed Chelsea by losing at home to the West Londoners. This result completes Sunderland's league programme, while Chelsea have one match remaining.

21 May 1963: Chelsea put seven past Portsmouth without reply and pip Sunderland to the remaining Second Division promotion place. The Third Division relegation decider between Walsall and Charlton Athletic is abandoned with the score 0–0 after the pitch was rendered unplayable by a thunderstorm.

23 May 1963: Birmingham City take a big step to winning the first major trophy of their history by defeating Aston Villa 3–1 at St Andrew's in the Football League Cup final first leg.

24 May 1963: England draw with the Football League XI at Arsenal Stadium. Jimmy Greaves, Alan Hinton and Johnny Byrne score for the Three Lions, while Roger Hunt, Geoff Hurst and Tony Kay score for the League. Elsewhere, Charlton preserve their Third Division status, relegating opponents Walsall in the process.

25 May 1963: Manchester United win their first major trophy for six years and their first FA Cup for 15 years with a 3–1 win over Leicester City in the final at Wembley Stadium. David Herd scores twice for United and Denis Law scores the other goal. Ken Keyworth scores the consolation goal for Leicester City, who have yet to win the final after three attempts.

27 May 1963: A goalless draw in the Football League Cup final second leg at Villa Park gives the trophy to Birmingham City.

31 May 1963: West Ham United, England's representative in the International Soccer League of 1963, begin their campaign by drawing 3–3 with Scottish club Kilmarnock in New York.

== Awards ==
Football Writers' Association

- Footballer of the Year – Stanley Matthews (Stoke City)

Top goalscorer

- Jimmy Greaves, (Tottenham Hotspur), 37

== Honours ==
Competition	Winner	Runner-up
First Division	Everton (6)	Tottenham Hotspur
Second Division	Stoke City	Chelsea
Third Division	Northampton Town	Swindon Town
Fourth Division	Brentford	Oldham Athletic
FA Cup	Manchester United (3)	Leicester City
League Cup	Birmingham City (1)	Aston Villa
Charity Shield	Tottenham Hotspur	Ipswich Town
Home Championship	Scotland	England

Notes = Number in parentheses is the times that club has won that honour. * indicates new record for competition

== Football League ==
=== First Division ===
In a First Division season with heavy fixture congestion brought about by a severe winter, Everton emerged as league champions – their first piece of postwar silverware. Tottenham Hotspur continued their brilliant start to the 1960s, finishing runners-up in the First Division and going on to lift the European Cup Winners' Cup to become English football's first winners of a European trophy. Burnley, the 1960 league champions, finished third. Leicester City, still yet to win a major trophy, emerge as surprise double challengers but eventually had to settle for a fourth-place finish in the league, and lost to Manchester United in the FA Cup final – with Matt Busby's rebuilding scheme paying off with the success being United's first trophy since the Munich air disaster five years earlier.

Liverpool's return to the First Division saw them secure a decent eighth-place finish and their players adapt well to what for many of them was their first season playing in the First Division.

Birmingham City's consolation for narrowly avoiding relegation came in the shape of glory in the Football League Cup, the first major trophy of their 88-year history.

Leyton Orient's first season in the top flight was a dismal one, and they ended it with relegation and being 12 points adrift of safety. They were joined in relegation by Manchester City, who finally went down after several seasons of gradually falling out of contention for honours.

Pos	Team	Pld	W	D	L	GF	GA	GAv	Pts	Qualification or relegation
1	Everton (C)	42	25	11	6	84	42	2.000	61	Qualification for the European Cup preliminary round
2	Tottenham Hotspur	42	23	9	10	111	62	1.790	55	Qualification for the European Cup Winners' Cup second round (Note: Tottenham Hotspur qualified for the European Cup Winners' Cup second round as the 1962–63 European Cup Winners' Cup winners.)
3	Burnley	42	22	10	10	78	57	1.368	54	
4	Leicester City	42	20	12	10	79	53	1.491	52	
5	Wolverhampton Wanderers	42	20	10	12	93	65	1.431	50	
6	Sheffield Wednesday	42	19	10	13	77	63	1.222	48	Qualification for the Inter-Cities Fairs Cup first round
7	Arsenal	42	18	10	14	86	77	1.117	46	Qualification for the Inter-Cities Fairs Cup first round
8	Liverpool	42	17	10	15	71	59	1.203	44	
9	Nottingham Forest	42	17	10	15	67	69	0.971	44	
10	Sheffield United	42	16	12	14	58	60	0.967	44	
11	Blackburn Rovers	42	15	12	15	79	71	1.113	42	
12	West Ham United	42	14	12	16	73	69	1.058	40	
13	Blackpool	42	13	14	15	58	64	0.906	40	
14	West Bromwich Albion	42	16	7	19	71	79	0.899	39	
15	Aston Villa	42	15	8	19	62	68	0.912	38	
16	Fulham	42	14	10	18	50	71	0.704	38	
17	Ipswich Town	42	12	11	19	59	78	0.756	35	
18	Bolton Wanderers	42	15	5	22	55	75	0.733	35	
19	Manchester United	42	12	10	20	67	81	0.827	34	Qualification for the European Cup Winners' Cup first round (Note: Manchester United qualified for the European Cup Winners' Cup first round as the 1962–63 FA Cup winners.)
20	Birmingham City	42	10	13	19	63	90	0.700	33	
21	Manchester City (R)	42	10	11	21	58	102	0.569	31	Relegation to the Second Division
22	Leyton Orient (R)	42	6	9	27	37	81	0.457	21	Relegation to the Second Division

Source: World Football
Rules for classification: 1) Points; 2) Goal average; 3) Goals scored
(C) Champions; (R) Relegated

=== Second Division ===
Tony Waddington's impressive Stoke City side, which included 48-year-old FWA Footballer of the Year Stanley Matthews, former Manchester United forward Dennis Viollet and former Burnley star Jimmy McIlroy clinched the Second Division title and with it a place in the First Division. Chelsea were promoted as runners-up, while Sunderland missed out on goal average.

Luton Town and Walsall went down to the Third Division.

Pos	Team	Pld	W	D	L	GF	GA	GAv	Pts	Qualification or relegation
1	Stoke City (C, P)	42	20	13	9	73	50	1.460	53	Promotion to the First Division
2	Chelsea (P)	42	24	4	14	81	42	1.929	52	Promotion to the First Division
3	Sunderland	42	20	12	10	84	55	1.527	52	
4	Middlesbrough	42	20	9	13	86	85	1.012	49	
5	Leeds United	42	19	10	13	79	53	1.491	48	
6	Huddersfield Town	42	17	14	11	63	50	1.260	48	
7	Newcastle United	42	18	11	13	79	59	1.339	47	
8	Bury	42	18	11	13	51	47	1.085	47	
9	Scunthorpe United	42	16	12	14	57	59	0.966	44	
10	Cardiff City	42	18	7	17	83	73	1.137	43	
11	Southampton	42	17	8	17	72	67	1.075	42	
12	Plymouth Argyle	42	15	12	15	76	73	1.041	42	
13	Norwich City	42	17	8	17	80	79	1.013	42	
14	Rotherham United	42	17	6	19	67	74	0.905	40	
15	Swansea Town	42	15	9	18	51	72	0.708	39	
16	Portsmouth	42	13	11	18	63	79	0.797	37	
17	Preston North End	42	13	11	18	59	74	0.797	37	
18	Derby County	42	12	12	18	61	72	0.847	36	
19	Grimsby Town	42	11	13	18	55	66	0.833	35	
20	Charlton Athletic	42	13	5	24	62	94	0.660	31	
21	Walsall (R)	42	11	9	22	53	89	0.596	31	Relegation to the Third Division
22	Luton Town (R)	42	11	7	24	61	84	0.726	29	Relegation to the Third Division

Rules for classification: 1) Points; 2) Goal average; 3) Goals scored
(C) Champions; (P) Promoted; (R) Relegated

=== Third Division ===
Northampton Town won the Third Division title and with it a place in the Second Division, while Swindon Town finally climbed out of the league's third tier, having been there since its creation 43 years previously.

Halifax Town, Carlisle United, Brighton and Bradford Park Avenue went down to the Fourth Division.

Pos	Team	Pld	W	D	L	GF	GA	GAv	Pts	Promotion or relegation
1	Northampton Town (C, P)	46	26	10	10	109	60	1.817	62	Promotion to the Second Division
2	Swindon Town (P)	46	22	14	10	87	56	1.554	58	Promotion to the Second Division
3	Port Vale	46	23	8	15	72	58	1.241	54	
4	Coventry City	46	18	17	11	83	69	1.203	53	
5	Bournemouth & Boscombe Athletic	46	18	16	12	63	46	1.370	52	
6	Peterborough United	46	20	11	15	93	75	1.240	51	
7	Notts County	46	19	13	14	73	74	0.986	51	
8	Southend United	46	19	12	15	75	77	0.974	50	
9	Wrexham	46	20	9	17	84	83	1.012	49	
10	Hull City	46	19	10	17	74	69	1.072	48	
11	Crystal Palace	46	17	13	16	68	58	1.172	47	
12	Colchester United	46	18	11	17	73	93	0.785	47	
13	Queens Park Rangers	46	17	11	18	85	76	1.118	45	
14	Bristol City	46	16	13	17	100	92	1.087	45	
15	Shrewsbury Town	46	16	12	18	83	81	1.025	44	
16	Millwall	46	15	13	18	82	87	0.943	43	
17	Watford	46	17	8	21	82	85	0.965	42	
18	Barnsley	46	15	11	20	63	74	0.851	41	
19	Bristol Rovers	46	15	11	20	70	88	0.795	41	
20	Reading	46	16	8	22	74	78	0.949	40	
21	Bradford (Park Avenue) (R)	46	14	12	20	79	97	0.814	40	Relegation to the Fourth Division
22	Brighton & Hove Albion (R)	46	12	12	22	58	84	0.690	36	Relegation to the Fourth Division
23	Carlisle United (R)	46	13	9	24	61	89	0.685	35	Relegation to the Fourth Division
24	Halifax Town (R)	46	9	12	25	64	106	0.604	30	Relegation to the Fourth Division

(C) Champions; (P) Promoted; (R) Relegated

=== Fourth Division ===
Brentford won the Fourth Division title, their first significant postwar success. Oldham Athletic, Crewe Alexandra and Mansfield Town also went up, while league newcomers Oxford United finished 18th. Bradford City, FA Cup winners in 1911 and First Division members for a number of seasons leading up to 1922, had to apply for re-election.

Pos	Team	Pld	W	D	L	GF	GA	GAv	Pts	Promotion or relegation
1	Brentford (C, P)	46	27	8	11	98	64	1.531	62	Promotion to the Third Division
2	Oldham Athletic (P)	46	24	11	11	95	60	1.583	59	Promotion to the Third Division
3	Crewe Alexandra (P)	46	24	11	11	86	58	1.483	59	Promotion to the Third Division
4	Mansfield Town (P)	46	24	9	13	108	69	1.565	57	Promotion to the Third Division
5	Gillingham	46	22	13	11	71	49	1.449	57	
6	Torquay United	46	20	16	10	75	56	1.339	56	
7	Rochdale	46	20	11	15	67	59	1.136	51	
8	Tranmere Rovers	46	20	10	16	81	67	1.209	50	
9	Barrow	46	19	12	15	82	80	1.025	50	
10	Workington	46	17	13	16	76	68	1.118	47	
11	Aldershot	46	15	17	14	73	69	1.058	47	
12	Darlington	46	19	6	21	72	87	0.828	44	
13	Southport	46	15	14	17	72	106	0.679	44	
14	York City	46	16	11	19	67	62	1.081	43	
15	Chesterfield	46	13	16	17	70	64	1.094	42	
16	Doncaster Rovers	46	14	14	18	64	77	0.831	42	
17	Exeter City	46	16	10	20	57	77	0.740	42	
18	Oxford United	46	13	15	18	70	71	0.986	41	
19	Stockport County	46	15	11	20	56	70	0.800	41	
20	Newport County	46	14	11	21	76	90	0.844	39	
21	Chester	46	15	9	22	51	66	0.773	39	Re-elected
22	Lincoln City	46	13	9	24	68	89	0.764	35	Re-elected
23	Bradford City	46	11	10	25	64	93	0.688	32	Re-elected
24	Hartlepools United	46	7	11	28	56	104	0.538	25	Re-elected

Source: rsssf.com
(C) Champions; (P) Promoted

=== Top goalscorers ===
First Division

- Jimmy Greaves (Tottenham Hotspur) – 37 goals

Second Division

- Bobby Tambling (Chelsea) – 35 goals

Third Division

- George Hudson (Coventry City) – 30 goals

Fourth Division

- Ken Wagstaff (Mansfield Town) – 34 goals
