= Clive Woods =

English footballer

Personal information
- Full name: Clive Richard Woods
- Date of birth: 18 December 1947 (age 78)
- Place of birth: Norwich, England
- Height: 5 ft 9 in (1.75 m)
- Positions: Midfielder; forward

Senior career*
Years	Team	Apps	(Gls)
1966–1969	Norwich Gothic		
1969–1980	Ipswich Town	267	(24)
1980–1981	Norwich City	32	(4)
Total		299	(28)
- * Club domestic league appearances and goals

Clive Woods (born 18 December 1947) is an English former professional footballer who has played for both Ipswich Town and derby rivals Norwich City.

== Honours ==
Ipswich Town

- FA Cup: 1977–78
- Texaco Cup: 1973

Individual

- Ipswich Town Hall of Fame: Inducted 2014
