= Len Julians =

English footballer (1933–1993)

Personal information
- Full name: Leonard Bruce Julians
- Date of birth: 19 June 1933
- Place of birth: Tottenham, England
- Date of death: 17 December 1993 (aged 60)
- Place of death: Southend-on-Sea, England
- Position: Forward

Senior career*
Years	Team	Apps	(Gls)
- Walthamstow Avenue
1955–1959	Leyton Orient	66	(35)
1959–1960	Arsenal	18	(7)
1960–1963	Nottingham Forest	58	(24)
1963–1967	Millwall	125	(58)
1968	Detroit Cougars	1	(0)
Total		268	(124)
- * Club domestic league appearances and goals

Leonard Bruce Julians (19 June 1933 – 17 December 1993) was an English footballer who played as a forward in the Football League for Leyton Orient, Arsenal, Nottingham Forest, Millwall and the Detroit Cougars during his footballing career. Julians also managed Kenyan club Gor Mahia, with him being one of the most successful and respected managers in the outfit's history.

== Career ==
He started as an amateur at Walthamstow Avenue before turning professional with Leyton Orient in 1956. He helped the Brisbane Road club to the Division Three South Championship with 11 goals in ten games in his first season, scoring 35 goals overall in his 66 games.

His goal scoring form attracted the attention of First Division Arsenal, who signed him in December 1958. His chances were limited but scored 10 goals in 24 appearances in all competitions. He was sent off by Referee Les Hamer in 53rd minute of the North London Derby at White Hart Lane in January 1959 for kicking Spurs centre half Maurice Norman which the Gunners won 4–1.

In the Summer of 1960 he joined First Division Nottingham Forest where he scored 24 goals in 58 league games. He left Forest at the age 30, in January 1964, to join ex-teammate Billy Gray who had become Player–Manager at Millwall in Division Three.

While he was unable to prevent relegation to Division Four, Millwall would bounce back with successive promotions, Julians contributing 40 goals in these two seasons. He played in 52 games of Millwall's then League record home unbeaten record of 59 games, scoring 35 goals, which ended on 14 January 1967 with a 2–1 defeat to Plymouth.

Midway through the 1967-68 season, Julians's former Orient teammate Phil Woosnam invited him to sign for his the Atlanta Chiefs team for the start of the North American Soccer League's inaugural 1968 season. The Oakland Clippers and New York Generals also wanted to sign him with the three clubs' names being placed in a hat to determine who would have first draft pick. The Generals emerged first and made their offer but Julians's transfer from Millwall was so protracted that in the meantime the Detroit Cougars pounced to offer Julians a player-head coach role. Injury restricted him to a single appearance and on 17 August 1968, with the Cougars at the foot of their division, Julians resigned.

He also had a spell as manager of Gor Mahia in Nirobi Kenya, where he steered Taya toward winning three league titles in 1983, 1985 and 1991.

After retiring from football he ran a garage with former teammate Bryan Snowden in Meopham before his death in Southend on 17 December 1993.

== Honours ==
Millwall F.C. Hall of Fame
