= Andy Nelson (footballer) =

English footballer and manager

Personal information
- Full name: Andrew Nesbitt Nelson
- Date of birth: 5 July 1935 (age 91)
- Place of birth: Custom House, England
- Position: Central defender

Senior career*
Years	Team	Apps	(Gls)
1953–1959	West Ham United	15	(1)
1959–1964	Ipswich Town	193	(0)
1964–1965	Clapton Orient	43	(0)
1965–1968	Plymouth Argyle	94	(1)
Total		345	(2)

Managerial career
- 1971–1974: Gillingham
- 1974–1980: Charlton Athletic
- * Club domestic league appearances and goals

Andrew Nesbitt Nelson (born 5 July 1935) is a former football player and manager. As a player, he won the Football League with Ipswich Town in 1962.

Nelson entered management with Gillingham in 1971, but quit to manage Charlton Athletic in 1974, and was an immediate success with promotion from the Third Division in 1975. 1976 and 1977 saw top ten finishes in the league, but in the following two years Charlton had rely on last day results to escape relegation, and Nelson came under pressure. In 1979, he came under increased pressure as Mike Bailey was appointed as chief coach, and by March 1980 his contract had been cancelled after three successive defeats with Charlton in the relegation zone.

== Honours ==
Ipswich Town

- Football League First Division: 1961–62
- Football League Second Division: 1960–61

Individual

- Ipswich Town Hall of Fame: Inducted 2011
