= Billy Baxter (footballer) =

Scottish footballer

Personal information
- Full name: William Alexander Baxter
- Date of birth: 23 April 1939
- Place of birth: Edinburgh, Scotland
- Date of death: 25 May 2009 (aged 70)
- Place of death: Dunfermline, Scotland
- Positions: Right half; central defender

Youth career
- Broxburn Athletic

Senior career*
Years	Team	Apps	(Gls)
1960–1971	Ipswich Town	409	(21)
1971–1972	Hull City	21	(0)
1972	→ Watford (loan)	11	(0)
1972–1973	Northampton Town	41	(4)
1973–1975	Nuneaton Borough	64	(2)
Total		482	(25)

Managerial career
- 1972–1973: Northampton Town
- * Club domestic league appearances and goals

William Alexander Baxter (23 April 1939 – 25 May 2009) was a Scottish professional footballer.

A native of Edinburgh, Baxter was signed by Alf Ramsey and joined Ipswich Town from Scottish amateur side Broxburn Athletic in 1960. When he signed for the club he was stationed at Aldershot during his national service with the Royal Engineers. He made his debut in 1960, in a Christmas fixture against Ipswich's local rivals Norwich City.

He was a regular in the Ipswich team than won the old Division 2 Championship in 1960–61 and Division 1 Championship in 1961–62. He later captained the team to the old Division 2 Championship in 1967–68. In total, Baxter played 459 games for Ipswich during an 11-year stay at Portman Road. However, after a falling-out with manager Bobby Robson, he was sold to Hull City in March 1971. This was an unfortunate end to a fine career with Ipswich as Baxter, who had played initially as a wing-half and later as a centre back was a consistent and loyal member of the squad for many years.

After two largely unsuccessful seasons at Hull, Baxter became player-manager of Northampton Town in 1972, lasting one year in the job. He subsequently joined non-league Nuneaton Borough.

Baxter quit football returning to Scotland where he worked as an engineer for British Telecom.

In his later years, Baxter had cancer. He had a leg amputated some time before his death, and succumbed to the disease at a Dunfermline hospital on 25 May 2009, aged 70.

== Honours ==
Ipswich Town

- Football League First Division: 1961–62
- Football League Second Division: 1960–61, 1967–68

Individual

- Ipswich Town Hall of Fame: Inducted 2009
