= Doug Moran =

Scottish footballer (born 1934)

Personal information
- Full name: Douglas Walter Moran
- Date of birth: 29 July 1934 (age 92)
- Place of birth: Musselburgh, Scotland
- Position: Inside forward

Youth career
- Musselburgh Union

Senior career*
Years	Team	Apps	(Gls)
1953–1956	Hibernian	3	(1)
1956–1961	Falkirk	135	(75)
1961–1964	Ipswich Town	104	(31)
1964	Dundee United	3	(1)
1964–1968	Falkirk	78	(7)
1968–1969	Cowdenbeath	8	(1)
- Gala Fairydean
Total		331	(116)
- * Club domestic league appearances and goals

Douglas Walter Moran (born 29 July 1934) is a Scottish former professional footballer. Moran is one of only three players to score more than 100 senior goals for Falkirk. During his career he made over 100 appearances for Ipswich Town.

== Honours ==
Falkirk

- Scottish Cup: 1956–57

Ipswich Town

- Football League First Division: 1961–62

Individual

- Ipswich Town Hall of Fame: Inducted 2011
