= Bobby Blackwood =

Scottish footballer

Personal information
- Full name: Robert Rankin Blackwood
- Date of birth: 20 August 1934
- Place of birth: Edinburgh, Scotland
- Date of death: 25 June 1997 (aged 62)
- Place of death: Edinburgh, Scotland
- Position: Wing half

Senior career*
Years	Team	Apps	(Gls)
1952–1962	Heart of Midlothian	136	(37)
1962–1965	Ipswich Town	62	(12)
1965–1968	Colchester United	105	(6)
1968–1969	Hawick Royal Albert	?	(?)
Total		303	(55)

International career
1960	Scottish League XI	1	(0)
- * Club domestic league appearances and goals

Robert Rankin Blackwood (20 August 1934 – 25 June 1997) was a Scottish footballer, who played as a wing half in the English Football League and the Scottish Football League

== Career ==
Born in Edinburgh, Blackwood began his career in Scottish non-league football for junior clubs including Milton House Amateurs, Merchiston Thistle and Kelty Rangers. He then made the move to the Scottish Football League to play for Hearts. He made 136 league appearances scoring 37 goals and was part of the successful team that won the Scottish First Division twice and the Scottish League Cup.

He moved to English football in 1962 to play for Suffolk side Ipswich Town, who paid a transfer fee of £12,000. Three years at Town produced 12 goals in 62 appearances. He moved the short distance to Colchester United in 1965, making 105 league appearances. His Football League career ended in 1968, and Blackwood moved back to Scotland to play for Hawick Royal Albert. Blackwood died on 25 June 1997 aged 62.

== Honours ==
=== Club ===
Heart of Midlothian

- Scottish First Division Winner (2): 1957–58, 1959–60
- Scottish First Division Runner-up (3): 1953–54, 1956–57, 1958–59
- Scottish League Cup Winner (1): 1958–59
- Scottish League Cup Runner-up (1): 1960–61
