= John Compton (footballer) =

English footballer

Personal information
- Full name: John Frederick Compton
- Date of birth: 27 August 1937 (age 89)
- Place of birth: Poplar, London, England
- Position: Defender

Youth career
- Chelsea

Senior career*
Years	Team	Apps	(Gls)
1955–1960	Chelsea	12	(0)
1960–1964	Ipswich Town	111	(0)
1964–	Bournemouth & Boscombe Athletic	28	(0)
Total		151	(0)
- * Club domestic league appearances and goals

John Compton (born 27 August 1937) is an English former professional footballer. During his career he made over 100 appearances for Ipswich Town between 1960 and 1964.

== Honours ==
Individual

- Ipswich Town Hall of Fame: Inducted 2011
