= Roy Stephenson =

English footballer

Personal information
- Full name: Roy Stephenson
- Date of birth: 27 May 1932
- Place of birth: Crook, England
- Date of death: 4 February 2000 (aged 67)
- Place of death: Ipswich, England
- Position: Winger

Youth career
- Burnley

Senior career*
Years	Team	Apps	(Gls)
1949–1956	Burnley	78	(27)
1956–1957	Rotherham United	43	(14)
1957–1959	Blackburn Rovers	21	(5)
1959–1960	Leicester City	12	(0)
1960–1965	Ipswich Town	144	(21)
1965–1968	Lowestoft Town		
Total		298	(67)
- * Club domestic league appearances and goals

Roy Stephenson (27 May 1932 – 4 February 2000) was an English professional footballer. He was born in Crook. During his career he made 144 appearances for Ipswich Town between 1960 and 1965 and was part of the team that won the Second Division in 1960–61 and the First Division in 1961–62. In 1965 he left Ipswich for Lowestoft Town and later managed Haverhill Rovers and Harwich & Parkeston.

== Honours ==
Ipswich Town

- Football League First Division: 1961–62
- Football League Second Division: 1960–61

Individual

- Ipswich Town Hall of Fame: Inducted 2010
