= List of people from the London Borough of Hackney =

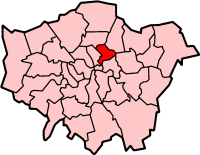
Location of the London Borough of Hackney within Greater London

Among those who were born in the London Borough of Hackney, or have dwelt within the borders of the modern borough are (alphabetical order, within category):

== Notable residents ==
Key to "Notes" in tables below regarding the residents' affiliation to Hackney
| Letter | Description |
|---|---|
| B | Indicates that the subject was born in Hackney. |
| D | Indicates that the resident died in Hackney. |
| I | Indicates that the subject is buried in Hackney. |
| L | Indicates that the resident lived in Hackney. |

Reference citations in the "Notes" column refer to the information in the entire row.

=== Academia and research ===
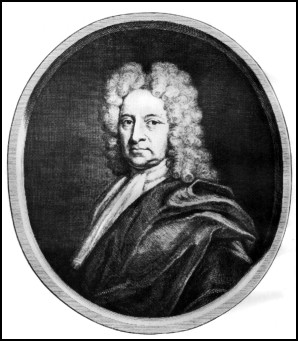
Edmond Halley

People from Hackney in academia and research
| Name | Notability | District (Note: Entries with no sourced locality (district) of residence available are marked with a "?".) | Notes (Note: All entries contain a reliably sourced reference. Entries may also contain a letter indicating the individual was Born, Lived, Died or Interred in Hackney.) | |
|---|---|---|---|---|
| Carol Adams | First chief executive of the General Teaching Council for England | District | Homerton | L |
| Arthur Aikin | FLS and founder of the Chemical Society of London | Hoxton | L | |
| Edward Turner Bennett | Zoologist and writer | Hackney | B | |
| Revd George Collison | First president of Hackney Academy | Homerton | L | |
| William Godwin | Political philosopher (studied) | Hoxton | L | |
| Philip Henry Gosse | Naturalist | De Beauvoir Town | L | |
| Edmond Halley | Astronomer | Haggerston | B | |
| George Loddiges | Horticulturalist | Hackney | L/I | |
| Sir Charles Martin FRS FRCS | Scientist; director of the Lister Institute of Preventive Medicine | Dalston | B | |
| Richard Price | Philosopher, mathematician, and first actuary | Newington Green | D | |
| Leonard Woolley | Archaeologist and discoverer of Ur | Upper Clapton | L | |

=== Arts and entertainment ===
- Zak Abel (born 1995), English singer-songwriter, musician, and Cadet national table tennis champion
- Jamie Adenuga, grime rapper, known as JME; co-founder of Boy Better Know
- Joseph Adenuga, grime artist, songwriter and record producer; better known as Skepta
- Freema Agyeman, actress, born and brought up on the Woodberry Down estate
- Eileen Atkins, actress
- Derek Bailey, avant-garde guitarist and leading figure in the free improvisation movement
- Jeremy Beadle, television presenter
- David Bendeth, born in Hackney, music producer, artist, songwriter, mixer
- Steven Berkoff, playwright and actor, educated at Hackney Downs School
- Lionel Blair, Canadian-born British actor, grew up at Stamford Hill
- Buster Bloodvessel, born Douglas Trendle, singer and frontman of Bad Manners, lived at Clapton Common
- Dean Blunt, producer, contemporary artist, singer-songwriter and former member of hypnagogic pop duo Hype Williams; real name Roy Chukwuemeka Nnawuchi; also known as Babyfather
- Marc Bolan, musician, born at Homerton and brought up at Stoke Newington Common
- Richard "Abs" Breen, singer and member of pop band Five; raised in Hackney
- Gary Brooker, musician, founder of Procol Harum, born in Hackney Hospital
- Tobi Brown, YouTuber, internet personality and member of the Sidemen; born in Hackney
- Bernard Butler, guitarist, known for his time with Suede; born in Stamford Hill
- Michael Caine, actor, educated at Hackney Downs School
- Paigey Cakey, MC, born in Hackney
- Phil Collen, guitarist with Def Leppard
- Steve Conway, singer (1920–1952), lived in Hackney
- Adam Deacon, actor, brought up in Stoke Newington
- Rob Dean, guitarist of new wave band Japan; was associated in his first years with Clapton (probably was born and/or brought up there)

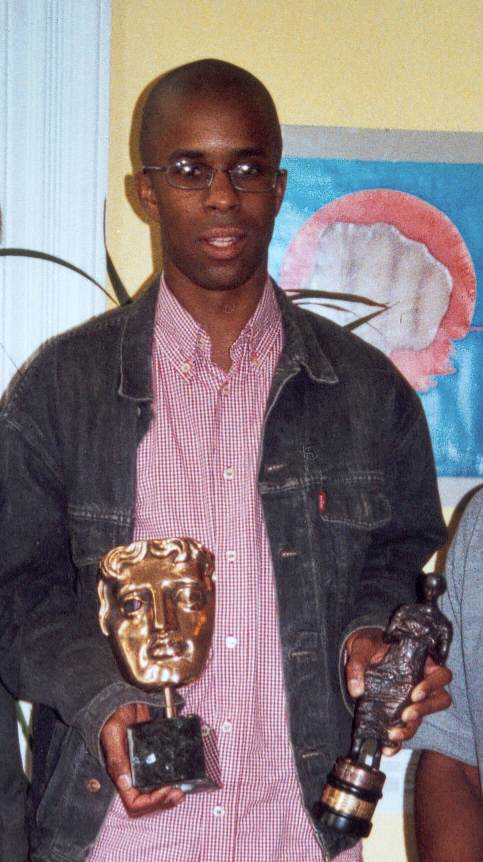
DJ Dextrous

- DJ Dextrous, born Errol Francis, Ivor Novello Award- and BAFTA Award-winning producer and DJ; born in Stoke Newington
- DJ Luck, born Joel Samuels, from the garage duo DJ Luck & MC Neat
- DJ Ron, jungle, drum & bass producer and DJ; filmmaker
- Pete Doherty, musician, lived in a flat in Hackney which was the site of many after-gig parties for his fans
- Johnny Douglas, conductor
- Idris Elba, actor and musician
- Paloma Faith, singer-songwriter, born and lived in Stoke Newington
- Michael Fassbender, actor, lives in Hackney
- Noel Fielding, comedian, Vince Noir in The Mighty Boosh and The Great British Bake Off host
- Colin Firth, actor, lived at Sutton Place, Homerton
- FKA Twigs, avant-garde and alternative R&B musician, artist and dancer, lives in Hackney
- Green Gartside, musician and frontman of Scritti Politti; lives in Dalston and formed his band in a Hackney pub
- Professor Green, rapper and singer; lived in Clapton
- Charlie Harper, British singer and songwriter, lead singer of the punk band U.K. Subs; born in Hackney
- Carol Harrison, actress, known as Louise Raymond in EastEnders; lives at Victoria Park, South Hackney
- Sara Hennell, author
- Gwyneth Herbert, singer-songwriter, lives in the borough
- Maddy Hill, actress, known for her role as Nancy Carter in EastEnders
- Alfred Hitchcock, film director, began his career at the Gainsborough Studios in Shoreditch
- Sharon Horgan, Irish actress, writer, and comedian
- Dave Kaye, pianist, born in Shoreditch; later lived in Stamford Hill

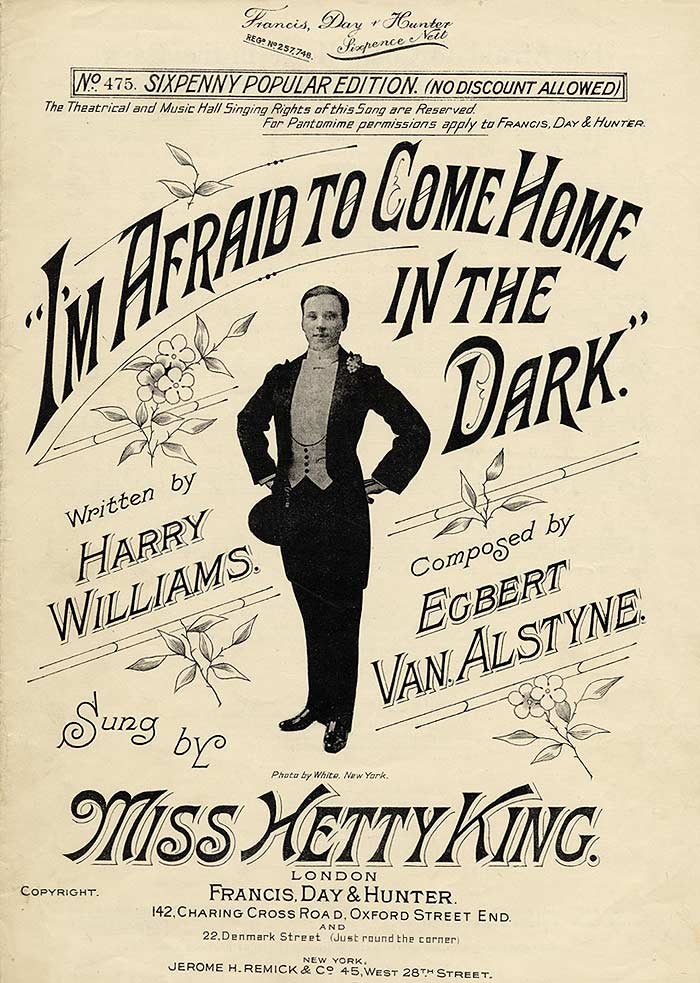
1907 Hetty King sheet music cover, 1907

- Hetty King, male impersonator of the music hall era; born in Shoreditch
- Labrinth, singer-songwriter and music producer
- Leona Lewis, singer, songwriter, first female winner of The X Factor; lived in Stamford Hill
- Marie Lloyd, entertainer, born in Hoxton and lived her later life in Hackney
- Lily Loveless, actress from BAFTA Award-winning drama Skins; born in Finsbury Park, London
- Peter Lowe, artist, born at Victoria Park, South Hackney
- Syrie Maugham, interior decorator
- Nicko McBrain, drummer for Iron Maiden
- Hoxton Tom McCourt, musician, face, born in Shoreditch and lived in Hoxton
- Martine McCutcheon, actress and singer
- Lenny McLean, bare knuckle/unlicensed boxer, actor, born in Hoxton
- Tom McRae, singer and songwriter, lived in Dalston and Hackney
- Bill Meyer, printmaker and artist
- Dicky Moore, musician
- Esau Mwamwaya, Malawian singer
- Trevor Nelson, disc jockey for BBC Radio 1 and BBC Radio 1Xtra
- Anthony Newley, actor and singer, born in Homerton
- Pauline Quirke, born Stoke Newington, English actress, best known for her role as "Sharon Theodopolopodous" in the long-running comedy TV series Birds of a Feather
- Tom Raworth, poet and visual artist, lived in Amhurst Road in the early 1960s
- Mike Reid, actor and comedian
- Rudimental, drum and bass group
- Bree Runway, born Brenda Wireko Mensah, musician, born in the borough
- Maverick Sabre, vocalist and rapper
- Aba Shanti-I, born Joseph Smith, sound system operator and dub producer
- Helen Shapiro, singer, educated at Clapton Park Girls School
- Daniel Sharman, actor, known for his roles in Teen Wolf and The Originals
- Matt Shultz, co-founder of band Cage the Elephant; lived in Lower Clapton Road in the early 2000s
- Marina Sirtis, actress, known for her role as Deanna Troi from sci-fi series Star Trek: The Next Generation; raised in Harringay
- Anthony Smee, theatre producer, writer, stage, radio, television and film actor
- Adrian Smith, guitarist with Iron Maiden
- Jessica Tandy, actress, born in Clapton
- Unknown T (born 1999), rapper, singer, media personality and member of 98s
- John Varley (1778–1842), painter
- Sid Vicious, musician and singer with the Sex Pistols
- Arnold Wesker, playwright, educated at Upton House Secondary School
- Robert Westerby, British (The Invisible Man, 1958), and Hollywood (The Three Lives of Thomasina), screenwriter, author, boxer
- Rachel Whiteread, artist, lives and works in Dalston
- Barbara Windsor, actress, born in Shoreditch and lived in Stoke Newington
- Ray Winstone, actor, born in Homerton

=== Business and finance ===
People from Hackney in business and finance
| Name | Notability | District | Notes |
|---|---|---|---|
| Robert Aske | Merchant and philanthropist | Hoxton | L |
| Sir John Harvey Jones | Businessman and television presenter | | B |
| Moses Montefiore | Financier and philanthropist | Stamford Hill | L |
| Emma Obanye | Businesswoman, entrepreneur | | L |
| Samuel Rogers | Poet and banker | | |
| Nathan Meyer Rothschild | Financier | Stamford Hill | L |
| Alan, Lord Sugar | Businessman and celebrity | Clapton | L |

=== Crime ===
People from Hackney with criminal notoriety
| Name | Notability | District | Notes |
|---|---|---|---|
| Ronald and Reginald Kray | Crime gang leaders | Haggerston | B |
| Dick Turpin | Highwayman, plied his trade | Kingsland Road and in Stoke Newington | L |

=== Engineering and technology ===
People from Hackney in engineering and technology
| Name | Notability | District | Notes |
|---|---|---|---|
| Sir Francis Beaufort | Hydrographer | Buried in Saint John's Church Gardens | D |
| Jean Charles de Menezes | Electrician wrongly accused of a crime; shot dead by police in 2005 | | |
| Joseph Priestley | Chemist and philosopher | Preached at the Gravel Pit Meeting in Homerton, lived in Lower Clapton | L |

=== Journalism and the media ===
People from Hackney in journalism and the media
| Name | Notability | District | Notes |
|---|---|---|---|
| Laura Bates | Feminist writer and founder of the Everyday Sexism Project | Hackney | L |
| Mel Calman | Cartoonist and writer | Stamford Hill | B |
| Benjamin Cohen | Internet entrepreneur and journalist | Hoxton | L |
| Robert Crampton | Journalist | South Hackney | L |
| Trevor Nelson | DJ (and MBE) | Hoxton | L |
| Donald Zec | Journalist | Attended Upton House Secondary School, Homerton | L| |

=== Literature ===
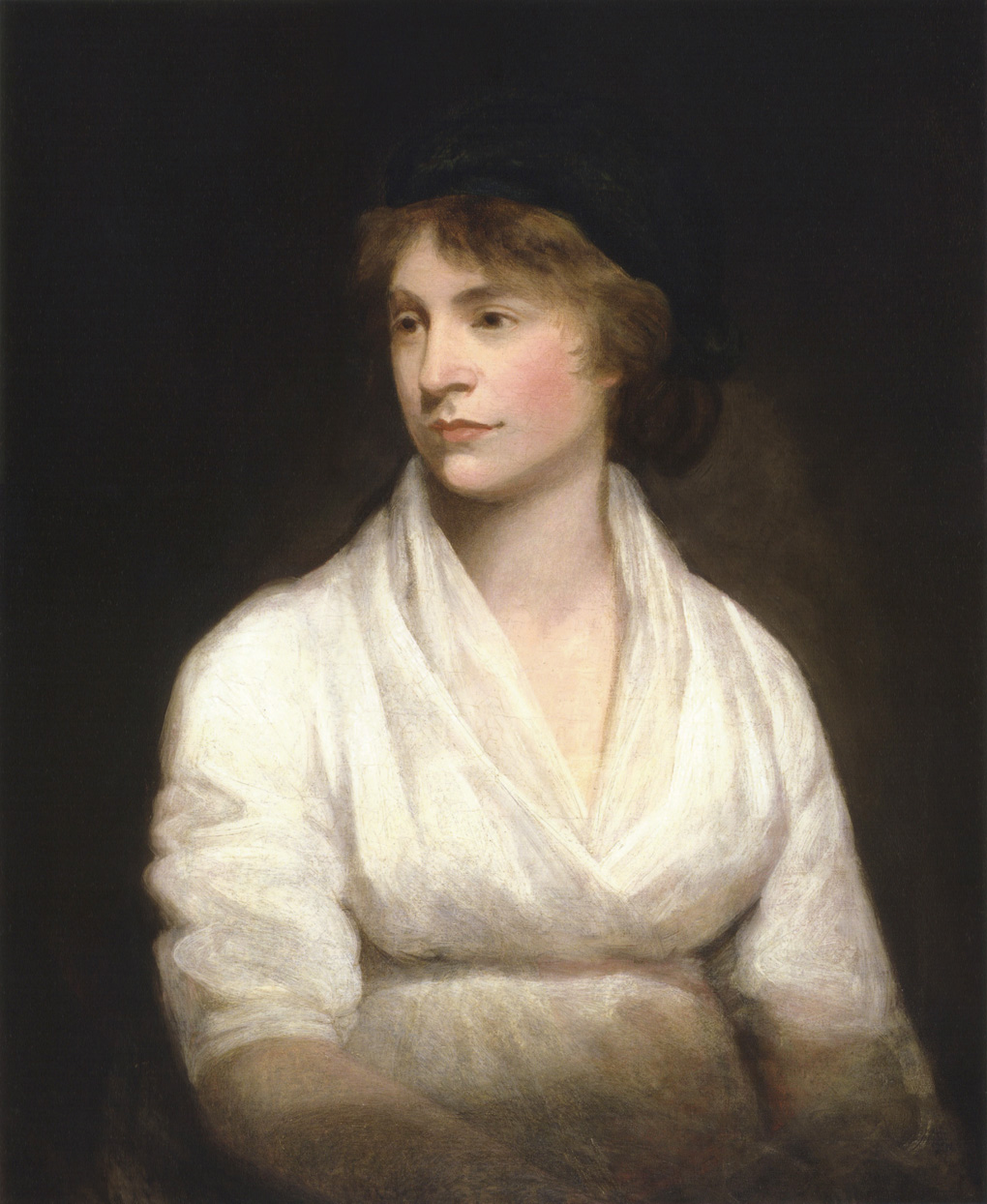
Mary Wollstonecraft, (c. 1797); a painting by John Opie

People from Hackney in literature
| Name | Notability | District | Notes |
|---|---|---|---|
| Grace Aguilar | Writer | Hoxton | B |
| Lucy Aikin | Biographer, daughter of John Aikin | | L |
| Talbot Baines Reed | Writer | Hackney | B |
| Anna Laetitia Barbauld | Poet, buried in Saint Mary's Church | Stoke Newington | L/I |
| Alexander Baron | Writer (works include The Lowlife, set in the area) | Hackney Downs School | L |
| James Burgh | Writer, educationalist and philosopher | | L |
| Rosa Nouchette Carey | Children's novelist | Tryons Road | L |
| Daniel Defoe | Writer and spy (educated) | Stoke Newington | L |
| Siobhan Dowd | Author | Haggerston | L |
| Sir Edmund Gosse | Poet, author and critic | De Beauvoir Town | B |
| Kate Greenaway | Children's illustrator | Hoxton | L |
| William Hazlitt | Writer (educated) | Homerton | L |
| Mary Howitt | Poet and translator | Upper Clapton | L |
| Mary Lamb | Writer, including co-author of Tales from Shakespeare | Hackney | L |
| Harold Pinter | Playwright and Nobel Prize winner | Hackney Downs School | B |
| Edgar Allan Poe | Writer (educated) | Stoke Newington | L |
| Samuel Rogers | Poet and banker | | L |
| Michael Rosen | Children's Laureate 2007–2009 | Dalston | L |
| Iain Sinclair | Writer | Haggerston | L |
| Mary Wollstonecraft | Reformer and writer, mother of Mary Shelley | Newington Green | L |

=== Medicine ===
- John Aikin, physician and author (Evenings at Home), brother of Anna Laetitia Barbauld
- Silvanus Bevan (1691–1765), apothecary and fellow of the Royal Society
- Edith Cavell, nurse and spy executed in Belgium in 1915, worked at St Leonard's Hospital
- John Coakley Lettsome, Quaker physician and abolitionist
- James Parkinson, physician and researcher; known for identifying Parkinson's disease; lived in Hoxton
- Hannah Woolley (1622 – c.1675), writer, amateur physician and advocate for female education; opened a school in Hackney

=== Politics and government ===
- Henry Allingham, briefly the world's oldest man and World War I veteran
- Major John André, soldier, executed as a spy by George Washington, lived with his Huguenot family at Lower Clapton
- Tony Blair, former British prime minister, lived at 59 Mapledene Road in London Fields 1980–1986
- Paul Boateng, previously high commissioner to South Africa, chief secretary to the Treasury, and Labour Party member of Parliament for Brent South; born in Hackney
- Harry Cohen, Labour Member of Parliament, born in Hackney
- William Randal Cremer, Liberal MP for Haggerston; pacifist; winner of the 1903 Nobel Peace Prize
- David Hallam, British Labour politician, educated at Upton House Secondary School, Homerton
- John Howard, prison reformer, born and raised in Lower Clapton
- John Hunter, governor of New South Wales lived and is buried in Hackney
- Samuel Morley, philanthropist and abolitionist, born in Homerton and lived in Stamford Hill
- Colonel John Okey, regicide of Charles I, lived in Hackney
- Nat Wei, youngest Life Peer ever to enter the House of Lords; social entrepreneur and senior advisor to the Cabinet Office on Big Society; currently living in Haggerston

=== Religion ===
People from Hackney in religion
| Name | Notability | District | Notes |
|---|---|---|---|
| William Booth | Founder of the Salvation Army | Stoke Newington | B (buried in Abney Park Cemetery in Stoke Newington) |
| Leslie Flint | Direct-voice medium | Salvation Army Maternity Hospital | B (buried in Hove Cemetery in Hove, East Sussex) |
| Percy W. Heward | Evangelist | | B |
| Vicesimus Knox | Anglican pacifist | Hoxton | L |
| Isaac Watts | Theologian, logician, and hymn writer | Stoke Newington | L |
| Jabez Whiteley | Anglican missionary, and first bishop of Chota Nagpur | Hoxton | B |

- Arguably, all the English Dissenters associated with Newington Green Unitarian Church, as the church itself lies within Hackney, although the rest of the green (and thus most of the houses) belong to Islington. Notable ministers of the church:
  - Richard Price, political radical who preached on the French and American Revolutions (see Revolution controversy)
  - Thomas Rees, leading authority of the history of Unitarianism, and made connections with the Unitarian Church of Transylvania
- The Little Sisters of Jesus are a Roman Catholic community of religious sisters inspired by the life and writings of Charles de Foucauld, founded in Algeria in 1939 by Little Sister Magdeleine of Jesus (Madeleine Hutin). They have had a community of Sisters at their council flat at Fellows Court in Weymouth Terrace, Haggerston Hackney since the early 1990s.

=== Sport ===
- William Barber, first-class cricketer
- Eric Bristow, darts champion
- Edward Cuthbertson, cricketer
- Kieran Dixon, professional rugby league player for London Broncos, Hull KR
- Leonard Garrett, footballer
- Phil Gilman, darts player
- Bert Goodman, professional footballer, born in Dalston
- Len Goulden, footballer for West Ham United and England
- Ron "Chopper" Harris, footballer for Chelsea F.C., raised in Hackney and attended Upton House School with footballer brother Alan Harris
- Tao Geoghegan Hart, professional cyclist, born in Hackney
- Shaka Hislop, former goalkeeper for West Ham United and Trinidad and Tobago, born in Hackney
- Peter Hobson (born 1932), Olympic fencer, international fencing referee; headmaster of Brooke House school; born in Stoke Newington
- Albert Arthur Humbles, world endurance record breaking cyclist, born in Dalston
- Phillips Idowu, world champion triple jumper, born and grew up in Hackney
- John Kane (born 1960), footballer
- Anne Keothavong, tennis player; grew up in Hackney and learned to play on park courts in the borough; still lives in Hackney
- John Lewis (born 1954), footballer
- Kevin Lisbie, football player for Charlton Athletic, born in Hackney
- Lawrence Okolie, professional boxer, attended Stoke Newington School
- Michael Page, professional boxer and mixed martial artist; lives in Hackney
- Sanchez Watt, professional footballer playing for [Wealdstone]
- Kaiyne Woolery, professional footballer for Tranmere Rovers
- Anthony Yarde, professional boxer
