= Timeline of tuition fees in the United Kingdom =

Tuition fees in the United Kingdom were reintroduced for full-time resident students in 1998, as a means of funding tuition to undergraduate and postgraduate certificate students at universities. Since their introduction, the fees have been reformed multiple times by several bills, with the cap on fees notably rising to £9,000 a year for the 2012–13 academic year.

== Background ==
=== Fees prior to 1962 ===
Before the Education Act 1962 fees existed in the United Kingdom - usually making up around a third of a university's income, the remainder supported by state subsidies and other sources of income.

=== 1962–1998 ===
David Eccles, Minister of Education, under Harold Macmillan's Conservative Government, published the Education Act 1962, which granted an exemption for "ordinarily resident", full-time, students from University tuition fees, along with introducing a right to a means tested maintenance grant. Fees remained in place for part-time and non-resident (overseas) students. The act remained in place till repealed in 1998.

=== The Dearing Report ===
In May 1996, Gillian Shephard, Secretary of State for Education and Employment, commissioned an inquiry, led by the then Chancellor of the University of Nottingham, Sir Ron Dearing, into the funding of British higher education over the next 20 years. This National Committee of Inquiry into Higher Education reported to the new Labour Government, in the summer of 1997, stating additional billions of funding would be needed over the period, including £350 million in 1998-9 and £565 million in 1999–2000, in order to expand student enrolment, provide more support for part-time students and ensure an adequate infrastructure. The committee, as part of its brief, had controversially investigated the possibility of students contributing to the cost of this expansion, either through loans, a graduate tax, deferred contributions or means testing state assistance, as their report notes:

20.40 We do not underestimate the strength of feeling on the issue of seeking a contribution towards tuition costs: nor do we dispute the logic of the arguments put forward. A detailed assessment of the issues has, however, convinced us that the arguments in favour of a contribution to tuition costs from graduates in work are strong, if not widely appreciated. They relate to equity between social groups, broadening participation, equity with part-time students in higher education and in further education, strengthening the student role in higher education, and identifying a new source of income that can be ring-fenced for higher education.

20.41 We have, therefore, analysed the implications of a range of options against the criteria set out in paragraph 20.2. There is a wide array of options from which to choose, ranging from asking graduates to contribute only to their living costs through to asking all graduates to contribute to their tuition costs. We have chosen to examine four options in depth

The inquiry favoured means tested tuition fees and the continuation of the means tested maintenance grants as well as student loans. It recommended that graduates made a flat rate contribution of 25 per cent of the cost of higher education tuition and that a mechanism for paying for this should be established by 1998–9. Following the publication of the report, the Labour education secretary David Blunkett proposed the Teaching and Higher Education Act 1998, on 26 November 1997, to introduce means tested tuition fees from September 1998. He also announced that the student maintenance grant would be abolished and replaced by student loans.

The government issued a response entitled "Higher Education in the 21st Century" to the Dearing Report. It stated "The Government plans to introduce an annual tuition fee of £1,000, representing about a quarter of the average cost of a course. Tuition will continue to be free for students from lower income families. Other full-time students will pay up to £1,000 per year depending on parental income. The cost of the fees will be balanced by increased loans for maintenance, also related to parental income. The overall effect will be that the total contribution required from the parents will be no greater than it is now."

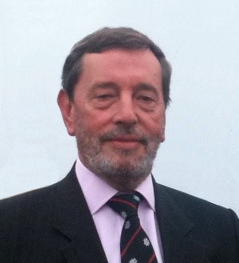
David Blunkett United Kingdom Secretary of State for Education and Employment 1997-2001 introduced tuition fees of £1000 a year.

== Introduction of fees (Teaching and Higher Education Act 1998) ==
The teaching and higher education bill was passed into law on 16 July 1998. In addition to introducing tuition fees, it established General Teaching Councils in England and Wales, introduced measures to reform the teaching profession and gave a provision for certain young workers to have time off for study. Prior to the passing of the act, the House of Lords passed three successive amendments to the bill which would have meant that English, Welsh and Northern Irish students studying in Scotland would pay a total of £3,000 for a four-year course to bring them in line with Scottish students. The amendments were overturned in the Commons but only after David Blunkett promised an independent review of tuition fees and how they operated in Scotland. The length of a typical honours degree in Scotland was four years compared to three years elsewhere in the United Kingdom. The difference presented a potential anomaly for when fees were introduced. It meant that students studying at Scottish universities would be charged an extra year of tuition fees compared with students studying a comparable course elsewhere in the UK. An independent review was led by Sir George Quigley, the Chairman of Ulster Bank, looked into the issue and reported on 29 March 2000. It recommended that a fees concession should be given to students studying at Scottish universities in the final year of a four-year honours degree, if they were domiciled in other parts of the UK. It also recommended that the cost of meeting this provision should be born by the newly established Scottish Executive. The recommendations of the report were accepted by the executive at an estimated cost of between £2.5 million and £3.2 million a year. (Note: The Independent review into the funding of tuition fees in Scotland (The Quigley Report) was established as part of the Teaching and Higher Education Act 1998 which introduced tuition fees in the UK. However following the passing of the Scotland Act 1998 devolved parliament was established in Scotland. The first meeting of the new Scottish executive was held on 12 May 1999 with responsibility for tuition fees passing from the parliament in Westminster to Scotland. The Quigley report published on 29 March 2000 meant that its recommendations were now the responsibility of the Scottish and not the Westminster governments House of Commons - The Scottish Debate)

=== Payment arrangements ===
The act introduced a means-tested method of payment for students based on the amount of money their families earned. Students whose families earned less than £23,000 would be exempt from fees whilst those families earning between £23,000 and £35,000 a year would be charged a percentage of the fees on a sliding scale. Those families who earned over £35,000 a year would be charged the full fees which amounted to £1,000 a year. The maximum fees rose in line with inflation, reaching £1225 in 2007–08. Starting with 1999–2000, maintenance grants for living expenses would also be replaced with loans and paid back at a rate of 9 per cent of a graduate's income above £10,000. All loans would be government funded and administered by the Student Loans Company, the organisation responsible for administering loans throughout the UK. (Note: The Student Loans Company was established in order to administer the Student Loans Scheme introduced as a result of the Education (Student Loans) Act 1990 and the Education (Student Loans) Northern Ireland Order 1990. It administers tuition fee loans to cover the cost of tuition fees; maintenance loans to cover the cost of living expenses; grants for living costs to cover the cost of living expenses and bursaries and scholarships from universities. It also administers the repayment of loans through the tax system via a method known as income-contingent repayment (ICR) meaning that the obligation to repay the loan is dependent on the gross income of the account holder Student Loans Company - About Student FinanceStudent Loans Company - Remit)

=== Reaction to the introduction of tuition fees ===
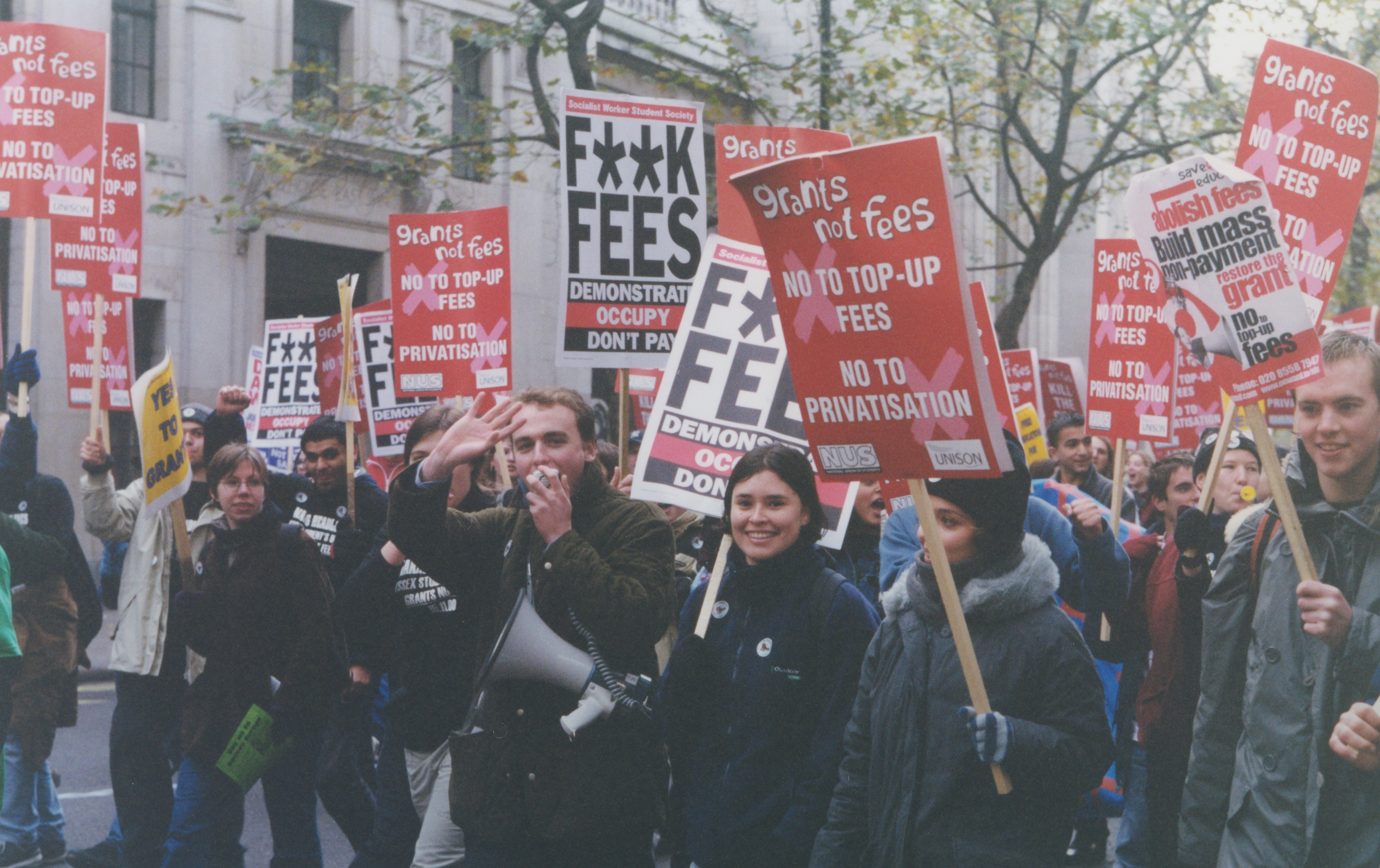
March against fees, November 2000

The decision signalled the end of the principle of free higher education and was met with concern by some in the Labour Party. Former Labour education secretary Ted Short said that he was ashamed to be a member of the party and Ken Livingstone accused ministers of "whipping away a ladder of opportunity which they themselves had climbed". On the other side of the argument top universities in the United Kingdom actually wanted to raise tuition fees further so that they could compete more on the global stage. Some universities argued for a "United States-style" system where institutions were able to charge fees at whatever rate the "market will bear". Howard Newby, the President of the Committee of Vice-Chancellors and Principals said that the challenge for universities would be in ensuring new income was "recycled" into bursaries for poorer students. Blunkett said that after the next general election it would be likely that there would be another debate on the issue revisiting the issue of university funding but that whilst he was Secretary of State there would be no top up fees. Howard Newby acknowledged that any further changes to the public funding of universities would need to wait "until after the General Election" although he added "Afterwards, the question is how to bring more resources into higher education. Fees have to be part of the equation."

== Post-devolution developments in the countries of the UK ==
=== Scotland ===
Following the passing of the Scotland Act 1998, devolved government was established in Scotland with the first meeting of the new Scottish Parliament taking place on 12 May 1999. The parliament had been given primary legislative powers meaning that over many areas elected representatives were able to pass their own laws. In particular its responsibilities included student fees, school standards and the training and supply of teachers.

==== The Cubie Report ====
University funding became an issue following Scottish devolution when the Labour Party and Liberal Democrats formed a coalition government. The Liberal Democrats had made tuition fees a "non-negotiable" element of their election manifesto and therefore a potential stumbling block to forming the coalition. Labour, the majority party in the coalition had, only one year previously, introduced tuition fees in the United Kingdom of up to £1000 a year and had also abolished maintenance grants. The Cubie committee led by the lawyer Andrew Cubie was formed in July 1999 to look into the funding of higher education in Scotland to try to find a solution to the issue of student financing which threatened to destabilise the coalition.

===== Recommendations of the Cubie report =====
The Cubie report recommended that tuition fees should be replaced with an endowment scheme with the Scottish Executive paying the fees up front with students only required to pay back £3,000 worth of fees when their earnings reached £25,000. It also recommended that poorer students would be entitled to a bursary similar to the old maintenance grant. The estimated cost to the Scottish government of the recommendations were set at £71 million. In the end the government announced that students would only pay back £2,000 of their fees but starting when their earnings reached £10,000 a significant drop on the recommended £25,000. With such changes, the Scottish executive estimated that the scheme would cost £50 million.

===== Response to the Cubie report =====
Speaking following the publication of the report the Liberal Democrats deputy first minister Jim Wallace said "we welcome the fact that Cubie recommends the abolition of tuition fees. This remains the party's policy... Andrew Cubie and his team have done a thorough job over the last six months. As he himself says, the extent of the need for change would not have been identified if the committee had not been established." The Scottish National Party's (SNP) John Swinney described the report as a "humiliation" for Labour saying that it left their policy on student financing in "tartan tatters". The Conservatives Brian Monteith was sceptical of the report saying "the Cubie Committee says it is abolishing tuition fees but they will be replaced with a graduate tax that recovers exactly the same amount that would have been paid in fees." The findings of the report were considered by a joint ministerial working group established by Scottish First Minister Donald Dewar. The abolition of tuition fees would commence in August 2000 with the endowment scheme taking their place the following year. Scottish students studying elsewhere in the United Kingdom would still be required to pay fees but Scottish students choosing to study in Scotland would not. English, Welsh and Northern Irish students studying in Scotland would be liable to pay tuition fees but would not be required to pay the graduate endowment. Students from outside the United Kingdom but from within the European Union would not be required to pay tuition fees if studying in Scotland but would be required to pay the graduate endowment upon graduation. In order to qualify as a Scottish student and be exempted from paying tuition fees, the student must have lived in Scotland for at least three years prior to the first day of the first academic year of the course. Students would also be exempt if they were classed as "ordinarily resident" in the country on the first day of their course. This meant that those students who had moved to Scotland for a reason other than study would be also be exempt.

==== The graduate endowment and its abolition ====
The Education (Graduate Endowment and Student Support) (Scotland) Act 2001 established the criteria by which the graduate endowment would be paid. Scottish domiciled or European Union students from outside the United Kingdom (Note: "The Scottish Parliament information centre", "The Education (Graduate Endowment and Student Support) (Scotland) Bill", "research paper 00-18", "page 2" The GE will be paid by those who have undertaken a full-time first degree course at an institution funded by the Scottish Higher Education Funding Council or the Scottish Further Education Funding Council. This is in recognition of the fact that many students study for their first degree at a further education college. Regulations to be made under the Bill will establish further criteria for eligibility: Liable individuals will be: - Scottish-domiciled or EU students. - Students whose full-time degree study exceeds a specified minimum period. - Those who have satisfied the criteria for being awarded a degree – i.e. to prevent students from not graduating when they complete their course.""page 2") who had undertaken a first full-time degree course on or after 1 August 2001 were eligible to pay the endowment. On completion of their degree, students would pay a fixed amount initially set by the Scottish government at £2000 and later rising to £2289 for students commencing their studies during the academic year of 2006–07. The amount would become payable after the student successfully completed their degree and could be paid either by taking out a student loan, paying a lump sum or by a combination of both. The first students began paying back the endowment on 1 April 2005.

Not all students had to pay. Those taking qualifications below degree level were exempt as were mature students over the age of 25, lone parents in receipt of a lone parent grant and those in receipt of Disabled Student Allowance. Students who dropped out of university would also not have to pay as they would be allowed "one false start". Certain courses, such as teacher training courses, were also exempt from the endowment.

In the summer of 2007, the Scottish government proposed the Graduate Endowment Abolition (Scotland) Bill that would scrap the graduate endowment altogether. It meant that no future students would pay the endowment and that would also apply to graduates who graduated on or after 1 April 2007. On 28 February 2008 the bill was approved in a move which restored free higher education in Scotland. The Scottish education secretary Fiona Hyslop speaking at the time said "We believe access to education should be based on ability to learn, not ability to pay. Today's removal of the graduate endowment fee is great news for current and future students and last year's graduates, helping to significantly reduce their debt burden." Labour's education spokesperson Rhona Brankin however said that its abolition would not tackle student poverty. Voting against the measure she said that ministers had "failed miserably" to produce evidence that scrapping the endowment would increase the numbers of people going to university.

=== Wales ===
Following devolution, the Welsh Assembly was given what were known as "secondary legislative powers" which meant that unlike their Scottish counterparts, they were only able to vary some laws set by Parliament in London. The assembly could vary specified devolved issues including setting and monitoring school standards, the content of the national curriculum and the training and supply of teachers. The cap on the amount of tuition fees that Welsh universities could charge rose to £3000 in the academic year of 2007-08 bringing Wales in line with England and Northern Ireland although the Welsh Assembly up until 2010-11 gave all Welsh students studying in Wales a grant of £1890 towards their fees.

==== Maintenance grants in Wales ====
Maintenance grants, initially up to £1,500 were re-introduced by the Welsh Assembly in 2002 in a move that was, at the time, seen to put pressure on the United Kingdom government who still favoured the use of student loans. The Welsh education secretary, Labour's Jane Davidson, said that £41 million had been ring-fenced for less well off families meaning that up to 250,000 Welsh students would be eligible for a means-tested grant of up to £1,500. Welsh students studying outside Wales would also still be eligible for the grants if studying within the United Kingdom. Students from the rest of the United Kingdom or the European Union however would not be eligible for assistance from the Welsh Assembly if studying in Wales. At the time the National Union of Students president Owain James welcomed the move saying "this is a great victory for Welsh students.... Maintenance grants are crucial to keep students in education." Speaking about the re-introduction of maintenance grants, the Conservatives education spokesperson Jonathon Morgan said that Labour had performed a U-turn and said that the party should apologise for introducing tuition fees in the first place. The maximum maintenance grant provided by the Welsh Assembly has since risen to over £5000.

=== England ===
==== Introduction of variable tuition fees ====
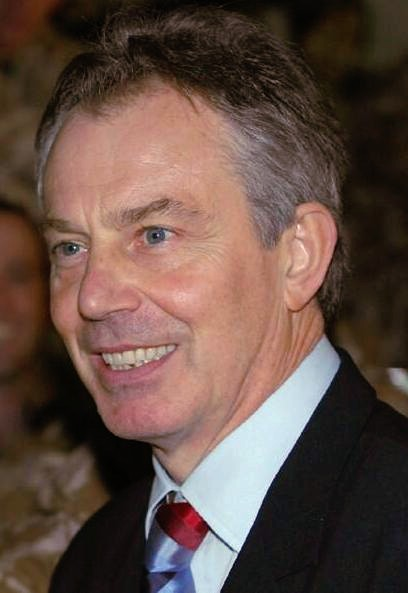
Tony Blair, former Prime Minister of the United Kingdom. Blair won a key vote on the introduction of variable tuition fees in 2003 with the votes of Scottish MPs making the difference

On 22 January 2003 the new Labour education secretary Charles Clarke published a white paper with proposals allowing universities to set their own tuition fees up to a cap of £3,000 a year. The proposal was controversial as during the election campaign for the 2001 General Election their manifesto stated that Labour "will not introduce top-up fees and has legislated against them." The white paper stated that the fees would only be repaid once the graduate earned over £15,000 a year. The likelihood of a backbench rebellion from Labour MPs forced Clarke to introduce a number of concessions to the rebels in order to avoid a Commons defeat in a vote held on 27 January 2004. Amendments to the bill included an increase in the amount poorer students could claim in a maintenance grant, a promise to review the £3,000 cap after three years and the promise to write off all student debt after 25 years. (Note: Think Money - Student Debt Guide - Is there a `cut-off point` for Student Loan repayments?"Your Student Loan will eventually be written off if you never earn enough to make payments, or if you haven`t repaid the full amount within a certain period. For loans issued before September 2006, any remaining debt will be written off when you reach 65, while loans issued after September 2006 will be written off 25 years after the first April of your graduation.") Eventually the vote was passed with Labour winning by 316 votes to 311 with 71 Labour MPs voting against and 19 Labour MPs abstaining. The result provided relief for Tony Blair in what had been seen as his biggest test yet as Prime Minister. Education Secretary Clarke said "had we lost it, it would have been a blow to our authority but as it is we have the ability to take the legislation forward." The Conservatives shadow education and health secretary Tim Yeo said the result was an "utter humiliation" for ministers and said that the vote had only been won because of the votes of Scottish MPs who had voted to impose fees on English students which would not apply north of the border. The Liberal Democrat leader Charles Kennedy said that "nobody has emerged from this shabby compromise with any credit." He added "it took a dodgy deal between the prime minister, the chancellor and backbenchers to get this Bill through." The Organisation for Economic Cooperation and Development (OECD) however said before the vote that the plans were "essential" for the revitalisation of British universities. University vice-chancellors meanwhile had previously warned the government that universities were facing a shortfall in funding. In their submission to the governments 2004 comprehensive spending review, the lobby group Universities UK requested a further £8.79 billion, a figure it was feared would grow should legislation to increase tuition fees fail. Such was the level of underfunding, vice chancellors argued, and assuming that all universities would charge the full £3,000 a year, the measures would only "ameliorate, not solve, the funding crisis" recouping only £1.4 billion extra revenue a year. Michael Driscoll, chair of the Coalition of Modern Universities, said "Universities face a financial black hole, but the real black hole is in teaching. We do not have enough money to pay our staff."

===== Scottish MP vote controversy =====
The vote on 27 January 2004 caused controversy as, because of the close nature of the result, the votes of MPs with constituencies in Scotland proved crucial in terms of getting it through. With university funding devolved in Scotland, the result of any increase in tuition fees would not affect students who chose to live and study in Scotland. Peter Duncan, the Conservatives' only Scottish MP, had abstained from the vote saying "This is a dark day for British democracy, and the actions of Scottish MPs are reprehensible.... The constitutionally cavalier actions of Scottish MPs undermine the devolution settlement and play into the hands of the separatists on both sides of the border.... Those Scottish MPs who walked through the lobbies today should hang their heads in shame." Shadow Education Secretary Tim Yeo said in a point of order "It is completely wrong that a bill which imposes higher charges on students attending the English universities should only be carried by this house using the votes of Scottish MPs when the students attending universities in the constituencies of those Scottish MPs do not have to pay those higher charges." In all 46 Scottish Labour MPs voted with the government with the 5 SNP and 10 Liberal Democrat MPs representing constituencies in Scotland voting against. Labour's Frank Doran, a Scottish MP who voted with the government said "my fundamental objections were about the variable fees and the effect on Scottish universities, but I think the effect of the variable fees has been mitigated in a huge way by the various concessions the government has made."

===== Higher Education Act 2004 =====
On 1 July 2004 legislation to enable the introduction of variable tuition fees was given royal assent and became the Higher Education Act 2004. Under the Act, universities in England could begin to charge variable fees of up to £3000 a year for students enrolling on courses as from the academic year of 2006-07 or later. This was also introduced in Northern Ireland in 2006-07 and introduced in Wales in 2007–08. In 2009-10 the cap rose to £3225 a year to take account of inflation. Students from the European Union (EU) would be eligible for the same level of tuition fees as students from within the United Kingdom. Students from outside the EU would have to pay the fees set by the individual university.

To cover the cost of the fees UK and EU students could take out a tuition fee loan meaning that there would be no requirement to pay fees upfront. The loan, which would not depend on household income, would be paid directly to the university or college from the student loans company.

The act also established the Office for Fair Access (OFFA) in an effort to ensure that the "introduction of higher tuition fees in 2007-08 did not deter people from entering higher education for financial reasons". It also would ensure that "universities and colleges were explicitly committed to increasing participation in higher education among under-represented groups". The fees also became known as top up fees as prior to September 2006 the amount paid for tuition would be a flat rate whereas from September 2006 the fees became variable and would help universities to "top up" the shortfall in funding to cover the cost of certain degrees. Speaking about the introduction of variable tuition fees in 2005, Higher Education Minister Bill Rammell, claimed that the changes were necessary saying "I think we have to get real. In an ideal world you wouldn't bring in these changes, but we don't live in an ideal world. To maintain and develop a world class system of higher education would cost the equivalent of 3p or 4p on the standard rate of tax". He elsewhere provided a different estimate stating that to replace the income from top-up fees, estimated by the government to be £1.4 billion., would necessitate a requirement "to put up income tax by 3%"

==== Calls for review in university funding ====
In their Changing Landscapes report published in 2009, Universities UK said that "in practice, although institutions theoretically had the choice whether to charge the full tuition fee, almost all chose to set the fee at the £3,000 cap". It also said that the "current fee arrangements" had not "created an economic market in which the price of an institution is a significant factor in how potential students choose the institution they want to go to and in which institutions compete on price to attract students." In their Conclusions on the Changing Market they said that raising tuition fees to £5,000 a year would be just the "maintenance of the status quo" and claimed that "students are insensitive to tuition fees below this level." The report suggested that "increasing fees above £5,000 would lead more and more institutions to review their practice of setting fees below the cap". Responding to the report Wendy Piatt, Director General of the Russell Group who represent 20 British universities, said "There is a growing consensus that without increased investment, there is a real danger that the success of our world-leading universities will not be sustained. In a difficult economic climate there is even greater urgency to find additional funding". She quoted research from the Higher Education Funding Council for England (HEFCE) which said that universities needed an additional 15-20 per cent worth of funding for current teaching levels to be sustained and suggested that an increase in tuition fees should be something that should be an option as the increase in 2006 had no adverse impact on recruitment.

==== The Browne Review ====
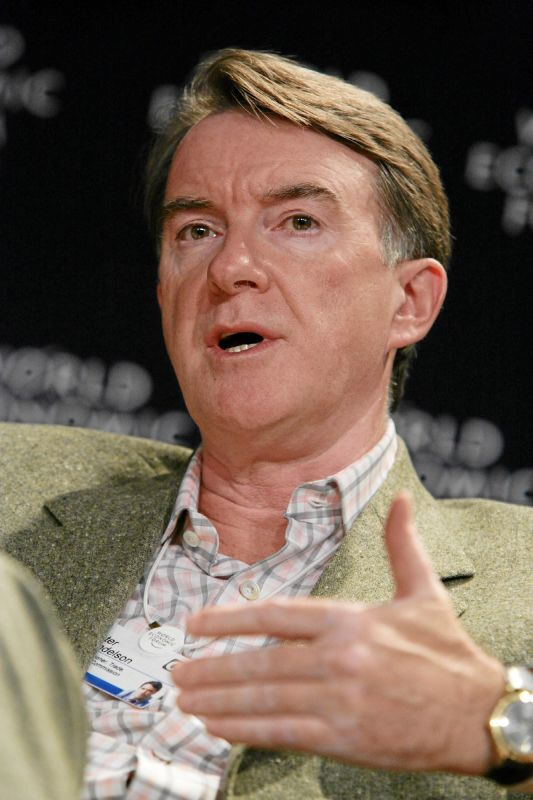
Peter Mandelson UK Secretary of State for Business, Innovation and Skills 2009-2010 commissioned a review into fees and university funding to be published after the 2010 General Election

On 9 November 2009 Business Secretary Peter Mandelson announced a further review into fees and university funding in England, led by John Browne, former chief executive of BP. Browne, a cross-bencher in the House of Lords and also known as Lord Browne of Madingley, was joined on his panel by David Eastwood, vice-chancellor of the University of Birmingham and Julia King, vice-chancellor of Aston University as well as a number of other professionals. (Note: The Times - Lord Browne of Madingley heads team to look at raising tuition fees Members on the Browne inquiry were Lord Browne of Madingley former chairman of BP; Sir Michael Barber former chief advisor to David Blunkett; Diane Coyle former journalist and Treasury economist; Professor David Eastwood vice chancellor of Birmingham university; Julia King vice chancellor of Aston university, Peter Sands chief executive of Standard Chartered Bank, Rajay Naik UK board member of the Big Lottery Fund) Speaking at the launch, Mandelson said that the review would take into account the goal of widening participation in higher education, the need for affordability and the desire to simplify the student-support system. He said that variable tuition fees currently provided universities with a secure income of £1.3 billion a year and "since they were introduced, student numbers have continued to rise, along with the numbers coming from lower-income backgrounds." The review would look at funding for both full-time and part-time students, considering tuition fees and alternatives to them, such as a graduate tax.

Speaking on the launch of the review, National Union of Students President Wes Streeting said "there is a real danger that this review will pave the way for higher fees and a market in prices that would see poorer students priced out of more prestigious universities and other students and universities consigned to the 'bargain basement'". However, the Russell Group's Wendy Piatt argued that the current level of funding was inadequate, saying "as universities are facing severe economic conditions and ferocious global competition it is clear that the status quo is not viable".

===== Political background prior to review publication =====
Following the 2010 General Election on 6 May 2010 no one party commanded a majority in the House of Commons and so following negotiations the Conservative and Liberal Democratic parties formed a coalition government. With David Cameron installed as Prime Minister and Nick Clegg as Deputy Prime Minister the two men produced a coalition agreement setting out how the two parties would work together. In response to the issue of university funding and higher education, the agreement said that higher education policy would have to await the outcome of the Browne report which had not yet been published. The agreement also made mention of the desire to increase the number of university places available. For the Liberal Democrats the findings of the review were a big unknown and potentially problematic for the party as they had made the abolition of student tuition fees within a period of six years one of their manifesto commitments and many of the party's MPs had signed a National Union of Students pledge stating that they would not vote for any increase in tuition fees. As a result of this potential conflict, the agreement stipulated that the Liberal Democrats could abstain on any vote which may require fees to be increased.

===== Reaction to the Browne Report =====
The recommendations contained within the report issued by the Browne commission contained one particularly controversial area in the removal of the cap on tuition fees. Lord Browne however in an interview with BBC Breakfast predicted that few institutions would put fees up very high. For the Liberal Democrats in particular it was predicted that the review would cause deep political divisions both within their own party and within the coalition government as many had signed a pledge promising not to vote for any increase in tuition fees prior to the election. Vince Cable, the Liberal Democrat Business Secretary, said the proposals were "probably on the right lines" whilst the Liberal Youth section of the party described the fee rise as a "disaster". Backbench Liberal Democrat MP Greg Mulholland immediately said he would vote against the plan. Within the media the Financial Times called the report by Lord Browne a "genuinely radical document that would, if implemented, lead to a free-market revolution in higher education provision". David Blackburn of the Spectator called the proposals a "sustainable and permanent solution" and described the plan as "progressive". The Guardian's Martin Hall however said that there would be a "social cost of variable tuition fees" and said that institutions rated highest in the league tables would be able to charge more and so force out poorer students. Nick Clegg, the Liberal Democrat leader, also defended the report saying "Everybody wants the same thing, not only sustainable funding for universities, but also a system where the teaching you receive at university, the upfront costs of it are free at the point of use, that we encourage more students from poor backgrounds into university than is presently the case and, crucially, that when people pay back for their university tuition, they only do it when they can afford to do it and that people who earn more pay a bit more back than others. I think that is a fair and sustainable approach and that is what we are looking for in the Browne report today." For Labour, the shadow Business Secretary John Denham said that the report deserved "careful study" and said that it was "right that some students make some contribution towards their education". However he added "We are concerned that many graduates will be shackled by debt for the majority of their working lives; that those on middle incomes in typical graduate jobs may pay more than their fair share and the highest earners will pay less and be free of debt much earlier."

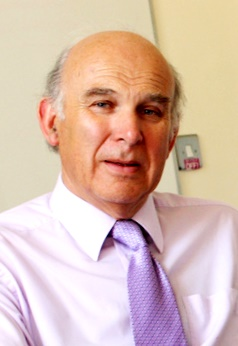
Vince Cable United Kingdom Business Secretary (2010–2015) in charge of implementing the changes resulting from the Browne review

===== Government response =====
On 3 November 2010 the government responded to the review by making a number of adjustments to the recommendations, the main one being the rejection of Browne's recommendation that the cap to Universities be completely lifted, instead agreeing a £9,000 per year cap. In terms of paying back the loan, Browne had suggested a flat rate of interest should be charged at 2.2% plus inflation. On this the government opted for a tapered rate which would rise to 3% depending on earnings in an effort to make the system more progressive. The earnings limit at which loans would begin to be paid back would rise in line with the Browne recommendations from £15,000 to £21,000. Business Secretary Vince Cable said that access to higher education would be on the basis of ability and not the ability to pay. He said "no-one will have to pay up-front tuition fees. We are extending loans for the cost of tuition to the majority of part-time students. No one will contribute until they can afford to do so – when they are in well paid jobs...The graduate contribution system that we have designed will protect the lowest earning graduates and ensure that their contributions are linked to their ability to pay; indeed, under our new more progressive repayment system, 25%, maybe as many as 30% according to the IFS, of graduates with the lowest lifetime earnings will pay back less than they do now." David Willetts, the Universities Minister claimed that the "progressive package" would put universities on a sustainable footing with extra freedoms and less bureaucracy. However, in return for that he stated that there would be "greater choice for students with a stronger focus on high quality teaching."

===== House of Commons vote =====
On 9 December 2010, MPs approved raising the cap on tuition fees by a 323 to 302 vote. The result gave the Government a Commons majority of 21. The majority represented a substantial rebellion in the Government with the coalition's majority being cut by almost three quarters and with 21 Liberal Democrat and 6 Conservative MPs actually voting against the government. A plurality of Lib Dem MPs (28 to 21) voted in favour of the Bill, including Nick Clegg, Vince Cable, Jo Swinson, Sarah Teather, Ed Davey, Danny Alexander and Steve Webb. Amongst those voting no were former Lib Dem leaders Sir Menzies Campbell and Charles Kennedy. Three junior ministerial aids acting as Parliamentary Private Secretaries also chose to defy the government with Liberal Democrat aids Michael Crockart, Jenny Willott voting no whilst Conservative Lee Scott chose to abstain. All three did so knowing that in order to defy the government whip they would also have to resign from the positions they held. Speaking on the governments victory Business Secretary Vince Cable said the coalition had been through a "difficult test" and added "I think the job now is to try and explain this policy to the country. It is nothing like as threatening to young people going to university as has been portrayed." Universities Minister David Willetts said the proposals struck the "right balance" and said "The package is fair for students, fair for graduates and affordable for the nation". Speaking against the proposals during the debate MP Greg Mulholland however said that sometimes governments get things wrong and added "I am voting against the government today because I simply cannot accept that fees of up to £9,000 are the fairest and most sustainable way of funding higher education." Labour's shadow Business Secretary John Denham said that the fees increase had been driven by the government's decision to make deep cuts in university funding alleging that "Even if they had just cut universities the way they are cutting other public services, students would be facing fees of no more than £4,000." Peers in the House of Lords voted to approve the plans on 14 December 2010 by a clearer majority of 283 to 215. Speaking during the debate, the author of the report on which the government proposals were based, Lord Browne, said that he believed the reforms were "essential for this nation to maintain its hard-won pre-eminence in higher education".

===== Judicial review =====
In 2012, the High Court granted permission for a judicial review to be heard in regards to the increase in top up fees. However the challenge was not successful.

==== Adjustments in the 2015 Budget ====
During the budget announcements of July 2015, George Osborne announced that tuition fees, which had been capped at £9,000 since 2012, would rise with inflation from the 2017–18 academic year onwards. He also announced that maintenance grants were to be scrapped from September 2016. The changes were not debated or voted on in the commons, instead being considered by the Third Delegated Legislation Committee in January 2016. The lack of a vote on the matter has drawn criticism, as by circumventing the commons the measures "automatically become law". The committee lacks the power to reject legislation independently. The budget announcements further proposed a freeze in the repayment threshold for tuition fee loans at £21,000; a figure which was previously set to rise with average earnings. The changes, if passed, will affect all Plan 2 tuition fee loans, backdated to cover loans taken out from 2012.

==== 2017 tuition fee increase ====
From the 2017–18 academic year, the upper limit on tuition fees rose to £9,250.

==== 2025 tuition fee increase and reforms ====
From the 2025-26 academic year, the upper limit on tuition fees rose to £9,595. It was later confirmed that, from 2026 onwards, tuition fees and maintenance loans will rise each year in line with inflation, likely following the RPIX metric. Beginning with the 2026-27 academic year, ability to charge the maximum tuition fees has become conditional upon teaching quality, requiring providers to have a Teaching Excellence Framework award and an access and participation plan, both from the Office for Students.

== Timeline ==
N.B. Prior to the Dearing Report, free higher education dated from 1962, and was part of the expansion associated with the Robbins report. From the 1960s to the 1980s it coexisted with the funding regime of the University Grants Committee, which supported university autonomy and traditional academic values.

== See also ==
- 2010 United Kingdom student protests
