= Vernon Lewis =

Vernon Lewis may refer to:

- Vernon Lewis (American football) (born 1970), American football defensive back
- Vernon Lewis (footballer) (1881–1941), English amateur footballer and minor counties cricketer
