= Carol Adams =

Carol Adams may refer to:

- Carol Adams (actress) (1918–2012), American actress and dancer
- Carolyn Adams (dancer) (born 1943), American modern dancer, choreographer and teacher
- Carol Adams (educator) (1948–2007), chief executive of the General Teaching Council for England
- Carol J. Adams (born 1951), American vegan feminist theorist and author of books on eco-feminism
- Carol Adams (politician) (born 1961), local government representative from Western Australia
