= Vernon Lewis (footballer) =

English cricketer

Personal information
- Full name: Vernon John Lewis
- Date of birth: 22 May 1881
- Place of birth: Woodbridge, Suffolk, England
- Date of death: 25 March 1941 (aged 59)
- Place of death: Woodbridge, Suffolk, England
- Position: Left half

Senior career*
Years	Team	Apps	(Gls)
1900–1911	Ipswich Town	185	(6)
Total		185	(6)
- * Club domestic league appearances and goals

Vernon John Lewis (22 May 1881 – 25 March 1941) was an English amateur footballer and minor counties cricketer.

Lewis was born at Woodbridge, Suffolk. He played football for Ipswich Town from 1900 to 1911, making 185 appearances and scoring six goals. This also included a spell as captain.

Lewis also played cricket at minor counties level for Suffolk from 1906 to 1910, making sixteen appearances in the Minor Counties Championship.
