= Teaching & Learning Academy =

The Teaching & Learning Academy (TLA) is a multi-stage training and mentoring programme offered to teachers and other school staff in England. It is designed to offer "public and professional recognition for teachers' learning, development and improvement work". Teachers can work on their projects either individually or collaboratively. They can also work inside of their school or across counties.

== Six core dimensions ==
At the heart of the TLA are six core dimensions, based on research relating to professional development for teachers. These dimensions are, engaging with the knowledge base, coaching and mentoring, planning your learning, carrying out your plan, sharing your learning and influencing practice and evaluating your learning and its impact.

== Structure ==
=== Since 2011 ===
Since 2011, the structure has been divided into four main categories:

==== Affiliate of the Teaching and Learning Academy (ATLA) ====
These members simply have access to the TLA's online resources.

==== Associate Member of the Teaching and Learning Academy (AMTLA) ====
Associate Membership is divided into two categories. At TLA Recognition 1, the Associate Member takes on a personal development activity. At TLA Recognition 2, the Associate Member takes on a reflective activity that impacts on people beyond his/herself.

==== Member of the Teaching and Learning Academy (MTLA) ====
These members are taking part in TLA Accreditation, which aligns to Levels 4-8 of the National Qualifications Framework.

==== Fellow of the Teaching and Learning Academy (FTLA) ====
A Fellowship is awarded to those who have had a significant impact on others. (Add source, define award more in depth.)

=== Previous structure (2004-2011) ===

Until 2011, the Academy was structured with four stages of recognition that incorporated the six core dimensions. Teachers could choose to produce work at one of the four stages.

At Stage One the expectation was that the impact of the teacher's work would predominantly be seen in their own classroom. This could be using "an area of interest, teaching strategy or new initiative". Stage one was expected to be carried out for a short period of time (from two weeks to a half term).

Stage Two required the “sphere of influence” to be extended so the teacher's learning affected their colleagues. Stage Two presentations required evidence of reflection whereas Stage One was simply a descriptive account of the learning; this was done through a “learning breakthrough”. Stage One was expected to last no more than half a term, but the more in-depth Stage Two took between one and two terms. The presentation demands were increased at Stage Two; a teacher was required to complete a learning breakthrough.

In Stage Three, teachers were expected to partake in a sustained piece of professional development. This was expected to last for between two and three terms. They were also expected to be familiar with the core dimensions for this stage.

Stages One, Two and Three are equivalent to the new Associate Member of the Teaching & Learning Academy.

Stage Four was intended to have a much larger effect. The impact of the work reached into the regional or national areas. This stage was also to provide recognition for those who make significant contributions to the knowledge base. Stage Four is equivalent to the new Fellow of the Teaching and Learning Academy.

== Achieving a TLA Stage ==
Teachers are able to achieve a TLA stage in a wide variety of ways, for example:

- Outlining a change in their teaching practice
- Describing the effect of a teaching initiative, for example, BBC News School Report.

== History ==
The Teaching & Learning Academy was originally launched as the Teacher Learning Academy. It was established by the General Teaching Council for England (GTC(E)) in 2004. The TLA was originally run in house by the GTC(E), before being contracted out to Cambridge Education in September 2008. From June 2009, a partnership with the College of Teachers allowed TLA submissions to be awarded accreditation by the college, as well as the TLA.

In anticipation of the GTC(E) being abolished, the TLA suspended activities in March 2011 and was put up for sale by the GTC(E). It was subsequently bought by the Cathedrals Group. In November 2011, the Teacher Learning Academy was relaunched as the Teaching & Learning Academy, with a modified structure.
