= List of Ipswich Town F.C. players =

Ipswich Town Football Club is an English association football club based in Ipswich, Suffolk. The club was founded in 1878 and turned professional in 1936. Ipswich has played at all professional levels of English football and has participated in European football since the 1960s. As of 2003, the team plays in the second tier of English football, the Championship. Since 1936, more than 400 players have represented the first-team. Mick Mills has made more appearances than any other Ipswich player; he is one of five men to have represented the club on 500 or more occasions, having played 741 times between 1966 and 1983. Ray Crawford is the club's all-time top scorer, with 203 goals in 354 matches, while Ted Phillips scored the most goals in a single season—41 in the 1956–57 season. The most capped player in the club's history is Northern Ireland's Allan Hunter, who represented his country on 47 occasions.

The list includes all players that have played 100 or more first-class professional matches for the club. It also includes some players who have played fewer than 100 matches, if they represented their country whilst playing for the club, and players who have set a club playing record, such as goalscoring or transfer fee records. Finally, all players inducted into the Ipswich Town Hall of Fame, whose inaugural members were selected in 2007 by a ballot of former Ipswich players, are included.

== List of players ==
Players are initially listed according to the date of their first-team debut for the club. Appearances are for first-team competitive matches only, including substitute appearances, while wartime and local cup matches (such as the Ipswich Hospital Cup) are excluded. Players who left the club prior to 2006 are referenced by Hayes, the others are referenced by Soccerbase.

Statistics are correct as of 2 November 2024.

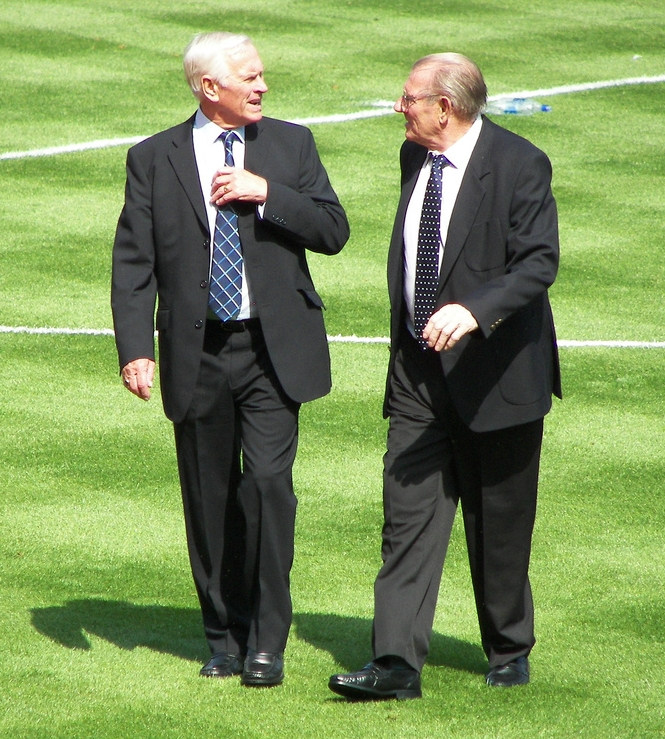
Ted Phillips (right) and Ray Crawford played over 600 games between them.

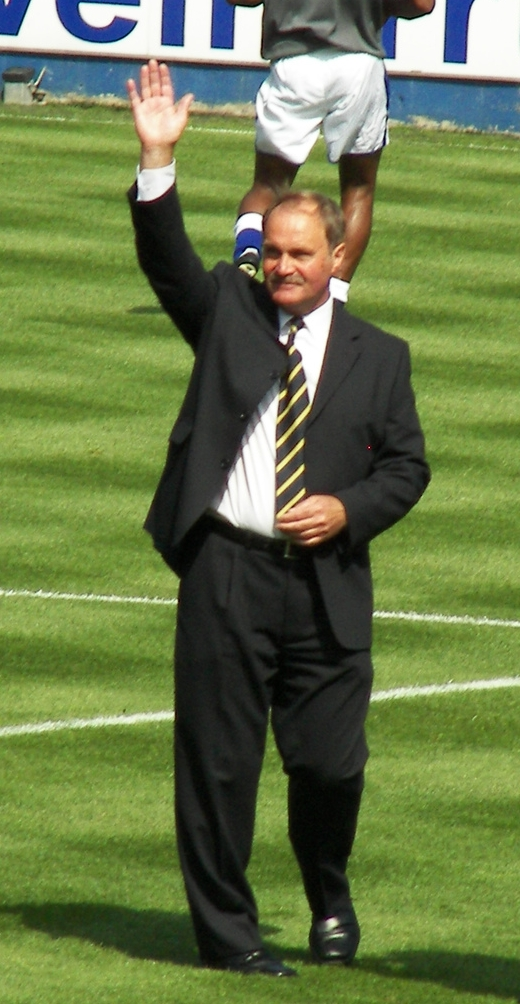
Mick Mills captained Ipswich and has made the most appearances for the club.

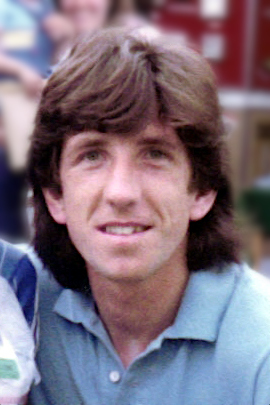
Paul Mariner was part of the Ipswich squad which won the UEFA Cup in the 1980–81 season.

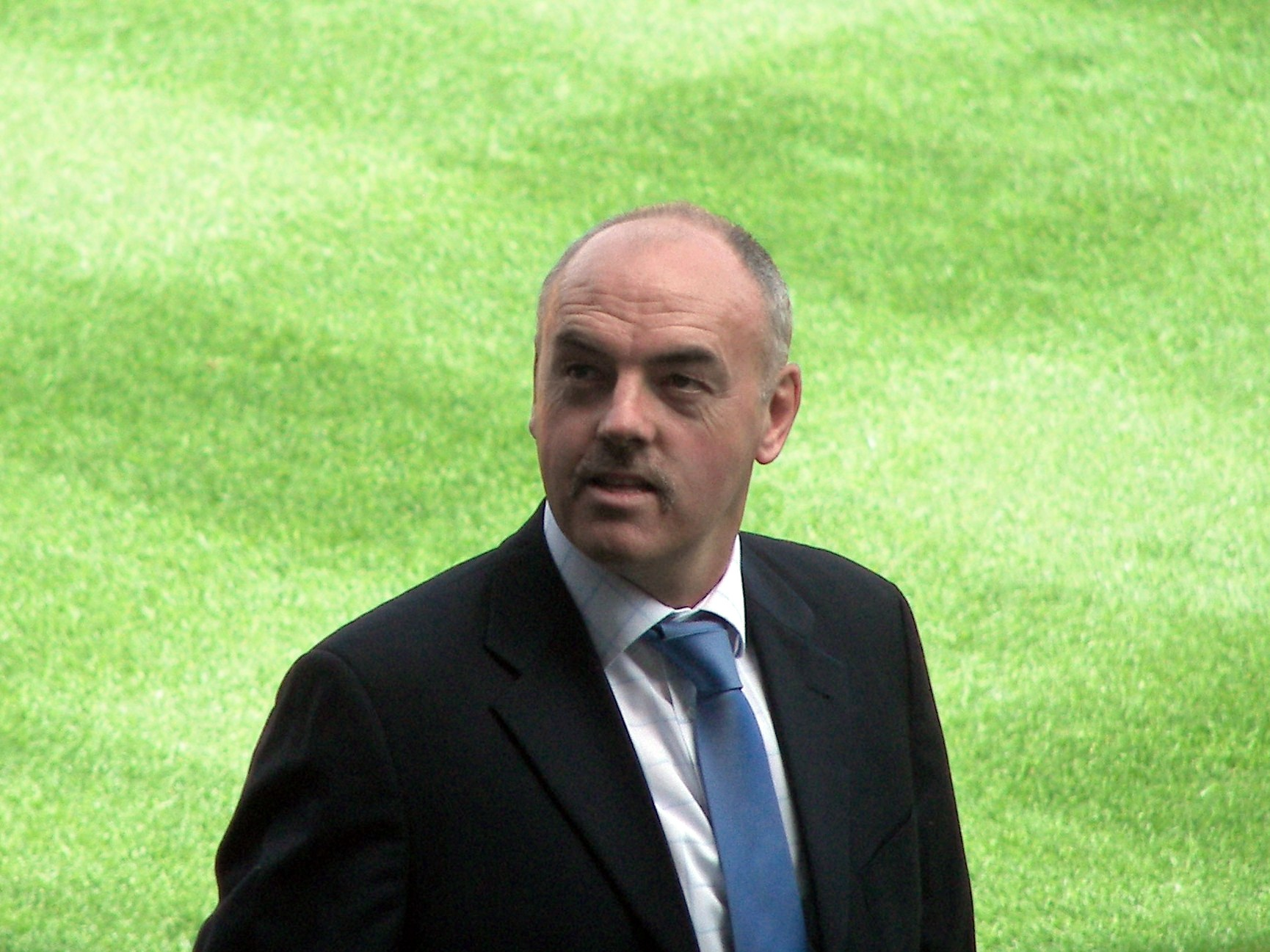
John Wark, one of the four inaugural members of the Ipswich Town F.C. Hall of Fame

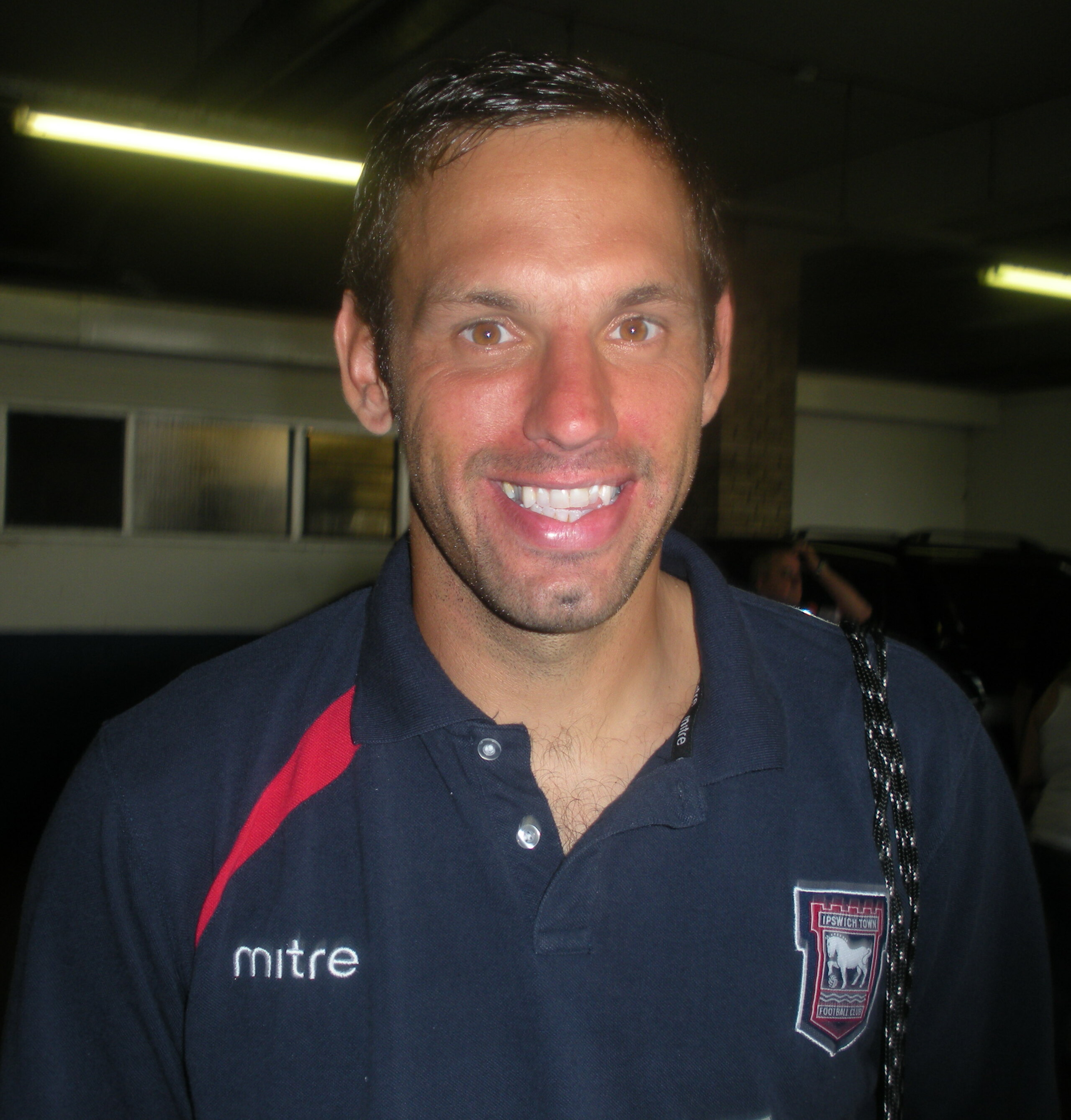
Richard Wright played over 350 games for Ipswich in three separate spells at the club.

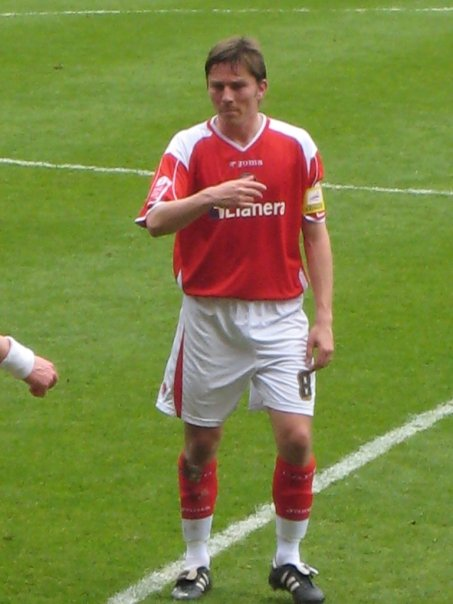
Matt Holland was captain of the club from 1997 to 2003.

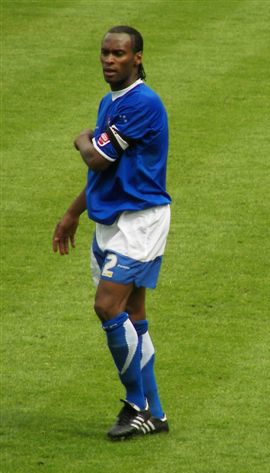
Fabian Wilnis was the Ipswich Town F.C. Player of the Year for the 2005–06 season.

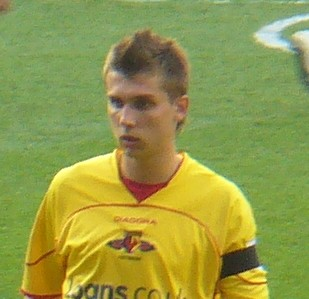
Hungarian international Tamás Priskin played for Ipswich between 2009 and 2012.

*	Ipswich Town Hall of Fame Inductee
+	Players who represented their country while at the club
^	Club record holder

Name	Nationality	Position^{[A]}	Ipswich Town career	Appearances	Goals	Ref(s)
Jimmy McLuckie^{[B]}	Scotland	Wing half	1936–1945	57	3	
George Perrett	England	Half back	1936–1949	145	4	
Ossie Parry	Wales	Full back	1936–1949	122	0	
Jackie Little	England	Forward	1936–1950	168	25	
Dave Bell	Scotland	Full back	1938–1950	187	3	
Mick Burns	England	Goalkeeper	1938–1952	168	0	
Tommy Parker	England	Wing half/Inside forward	1945–1956	475	95	
George Rumbold	England	Full back	1946–1950	130	11	
Harry Baird	Northern Ireland	Wing half	1946–1951	227	7	
Stan Parker	England	Forward	1946–1951	141	51	
Tom Brown	Scotland	Goalkeeper	1946–1951	116	0	
Bill Jennings	England	Forward	1947–1951	108	42	
Jackie Brown	Northern Ireland	Winger	1948–1951	103	27	
Doug Rees	Wales	Inside forward	1949–1959	387	1	
Neil Myles	Scotland	Wing half	1949–1959	245	18	
John Elsworthy*	Wales	Wing half	1949–1964	435	52	
Sammy McCrory	Northern Ireland	Inside forward	1950–1952	102	40	
Jim Feeney	Northern Ireland	Centre half	1950–1955	232	0	
Jack Parry	Wales	Goalkeeper	1951–1955	154	0	
Tom Garneys	England	Forward	1951–1958	273	143	
Basil Acres*	England	Full back	1951–1960	232	6	
Billy Reed^{[C]}	Wales+	Right winger	1953–1958	168	46	
George MacLuckie	Scotland	Winger	1953–1958	152	25	
Ken Malcolm	Scotland	Left full back	1954–1963	291	2	
Ted Phillips*^{[D]}	England	Inside forward	1954–1964	295	181^	
Jimmy Leadbetter*	Scotland	Winger/Midfielder	1955–1965	375	49	
Doug Millward	England	Forward	1956–1963	155	36	
Roy Bailey*	England	Goalkeeper	1956–1964	346	0	
Larry Carberry*	England	Right full back	1956–1964	285	0	
Reg Pickett	England	Wing half	1957–1962	148	4	
Dermot Curtis	Republic of Ireland+	Forward	1958–1963	42	17	
Ray Crawford*^{[E]}	England+	Forward	1958–1969	354	218^	
Andy Nelson*	England	Centre half	1959–1964	215	0	
Roy Stephenson*	England	Right winger	1960–1964	163	26	
John Compton*	England	Full back	1960–1964	131	0	
Billy Baxter*	Scotland	Centre half	1960–1971	459	22	
Doug Moran*	Scotland	Inside forward	1961–1964	123	37	
Gerry Baker	United States	Forward	1963–1967	151	66	
Joe Broadfoot	England	Winger	1963–1968	115	21	
Danny Hegan*	Northern Ireland	Midfielder	1963–1969	230	38	
Ken Hancock	England	Goalkeeper	1964–1968	180	0	
Cyril Lea*	Wales+	Wing half	1964–1969	123	2	
Frank Brogan	Scotland	Winger	1964–1970	223	69	
Mick McNeil	England	Defender	1964–1972	173	5	
Billy Houghton	England	Full back	1966–1969	117	3	
Chris Barnard	England	Midfielder	1966–1970	21	0	
Colin Harper*	England	Full back	1966–1974	176	6	
Mick Mills*^{[F]}	England+	Full back/Midfielder	1966–1983	741^	30	
Ron Wigg	Republic of Ireland+	Forward	1967–1970	37	14	
Tommy Carroll	Republic of Ireland+	Right full back	1967–1971	126	3	
Derek Jefferson	England	Central defender	1967–1972	175	1	
Colin Viljoen	England+	Midfielder	1967–1978	372	54	
Peter Morris	England	Midfielder	1968–1974	258	16	
David Best	England	Goalkeeper	1968–1974	199	0	
Mick Hill	Wales+	Forward	1969–1972	77	20	
Ian Collard	England	Midfielder	1969–1975	111	6	
Mick Lambert*	England	Winger	1969–1979	263	45	
Clive Woods*	England	Midfielder/Forward	1969–1980	338	31	
Trevor Whymark*	England+	Forward	1970–1979	335	104	
Laurie Sivell	England	Goalkeeper	1970–1984	175	0	
Bryan Hamilton*	Northern Ireland+	Midfielder	1971–1975	199	56	
Allan Hunter*^{[G]}	Northern Ireland+^	Central defender	1971–1982	355	10	
David Johnson*	England+	Forward	1972–1976	178	46	
Kevin Beattie*	England+	Central defender	1972–1981	307	32	
Roger Osborne*	England	Midfielder	1973–1980	149	10	
George Burley*	Scotland+	Right full back	1973–1985	500	10	
Eric Gates*	England+	Forward/Midfielder	1973–1985	378	96	
Bruce Twamley	Canada+	Full back	1974–1975	2	0	
Brian Talbot*	England+	Midfielder	1974–1978	227	31	
Paul Cooper*	England	Goalkeeper	1974–1987	575	0	
Pat Sharkey	Northern Ireland+	Midfielder	1975–1977	19	1	
John Wark*^{[H]}	Scotland+	Midfielder	1975–1996	678	190	
Paul Mariner*	England+	Forward	1976–1984	339	135	
Russell Osman*	England+	Central defender	1977–1985	385	21	
Arnold Mühren*	Netherlands+	Midfielder	1978–1982	214	29	
Alan Brazil*	Scotland+	Forward	1978–1983	210	80	
Terry Butcher*	England+	Central defender	1978–1986	350	21	
Frans Thijssen*	Netherlands+	Midfielder	1979–1983	170	16	
Steve McCall	England	Left back/Midfielder	1979–1987	340	12	
Mich d'Avray	South Africa	Forward	1979–1990	255	45	
Kevin O'Callaghan	Republic of Ireland+	Left winger	1980–1984	147	5	
Trevor Putney	England	Midfielder	1982–1986	127	9	
Mark Brennan	England	Midfielder	1983–1988	212	25	
Ian Cranson	England	Central defender	1983–1988	165	5	
Romeo Zondervan	Netherlands	Midfielder	1984–1992	325	20	
Frank Yallop	Canada+	Full back	1984–1996	386	8	
Jason Dozzell*	England	Midfielder	1984–1997	414	72	
Kevin Wilson	Northern Ireland+	Forward	1985–1987	125	49	
Mick Stockwell*	England	Midfielder	1985–2000	608	44	
Tony Humes	England	Midfielder	1986–1991	140	12	
David Lowe	England	Midfielder	1987–1991	169	42	
Simon Milton*	England	Midfielder	1987–1998	332	55	
David Linighan	England	Central defender	1988–1995	327	13	
Chris Kiwomya	England	Forward	1988–1995	259	62	
Craig Forrest	Canada+	Goalkeeper	1988–1997	304	0	
Neil Thompson	England	Left back	1989–1995	246	23	
Gavin Johnson	England	Defender	1989–1995	160	16	
Steve Palmer	England	Defender	1989–1995	131	3	
Steve Whitton	England	Forward	1991–1994	109	19	
Boncho Genchev	Bulgaria+	Forward	1992–1995	75	11	
Geraint Williams	Wales+	Midfielder	1992–1998	264	2	
Paul Mason	England	Midfielder	1993–1998	134	35	
Steve Sedgley	England	Midfielder	1994–1997	135	16	
Claus Thomsen	Denmark+	Defender	1994–1997	97	8	
Mauricio Taricco	Argentina	Defender	1994–1998	170	7	
Alex Mathie	Scotland	Forward	1995–1998	132	47	
Gus Uhlenbeek	Netherlands	Defender	1995–1998	112	4	
Tony Mowbray*	England	Central defender	1995–2000	153	8	
Richard Wright	England+	Goalkeeper	1995–2001; 2008–2010; 2011–2012	362	0	
James Scowcroft	England	Forward	1995–2001; 2004–2005	257	55	
Richard Naylor	England	Forward/Defender	1996–2009	362	40	
Danny Sonner	Northern Ireland+	Midfielder	1996–1998	69	4	
Kieron Dyer	England	Midfielder	1996–1999	110	15	
Bobby Petta	Netherlands	Midfielder	1996–1999	71	9	
David Johnson	Jamaica+	Forward	1997–2000	158	62	
Mark Venus	England	Defender	1997–2002	184	19	
Matt Holland*	Republic of Ireland+	Midfielder	1997–2003	314	46	
Jamie Clapham	England	Defender	1998–2003	252	16	
Fabian Wilnis	Netherlands	Defender	1999–2008	311	6	
Jermaine Wright	England	Midfielder	1999–2004	221	11	
John McGreal	England	Defender	1999–2004	150	5	
Jim Magilton	Northern Ireland+	Midfielder	1999–2006	322	22	
Amir Karić	Slovenia+	Defender	2000–2001	3	0	
Hermann Hreiðarsson*	Iceland+	Defender	2000–2003	128	3	
Martijn Reuser	Netherlands	Midfielder	2000–2004	114	19	
Tommy Miller	England	Midfielder	2001–2005; 2007–2009	204	45	
Pablo Couñago	Spain	Forward	2001–2005; 2007–2011	242	62	
Finidi George	Nigeria+	Forward	2001–2002	46	8	
Matteo Sereni^^{[I]}	Italy	Goalkeeper	2001–2003	33	0	
Darren Bent	England	Forward	2001–2005	142	57	
Mark Burchill	Scotland	Forward	2001	7	1	
Matt Richards	England	Full back	2002–2009	162	9	
Ian Westlake	England	Midfielder	2002–2006	121	17	
Shefki Kuqi	Finland+	Forward	2003–2005; 2007–2008	88	33	
Jason de Vos*	Canada+	Defender	2004–2008	177	11	
Lewis Price	Wales+	Goalkeeper	2004–2007	75	0	
Owen Garvan	Republic of Ireland	Midfielder	2005–2010	169	15	
Danny Haynes	England	Forward	2005–2009	128	19	
Gavin Williams	Wales+	Midfielder	2005–2007	59	3	
Jaime Peters	Canada+	Midfielder	2005–2012	114	4	
Alan Lee	Republic of Ireland+	Forward	2006–2008	109	34	
Alex Bruce	Republic of Ireland+	Defender	2006–2010	127	3	
David Wright	England	Defender	2006–2010	120	5	
Jonathan Walters	Republic of Ireland+	Forward	2006–2010; 2018	149	32	
Velice Šumulikoski	North Macedonia+	Midfielder	2007–2009	43	1	
David Norris	England	Midfielder	2008–2011	118	16	
Gareth McAuley	Northern Ireland+	Defender	2008–2011	127	8	
Giovani dos Santos	Mexico+	Midfielder	2008–2009	8	4	
Tommy Smith	New Zealand+	Defender	2007–2018	267	23	
Reggie Lambe	Bermuda+	Midfielder	2009–2011	5	0	
Connor Wickham^^{[J]}	England	Forward	2009–2011	72	15	
Luciano Civelli	Argentina	Midfielder	2009–2011	17	0	
Tamás Priskin	Hungary+	Forward	2009–2012	60	9	
Damien Delaney	Republic of Ireland+	Defender	2009–2012	106	3	
Lee Martin	England	Midfielder	2009–2013	106	6	
Carlos Edwards	Trinidad and Tobago+	Full back/Winger	2009–2014	191	10	
Grant Leadbitter	England	Midfielder	2009–2012	126	14	
Daryl Murphy	Republic of Ireland+	Forward	2010; 2011–2016	225	67	
Luke Hyam	England	Midfielder	2010–2018	146	3	
Márton Fülöp	Hungary+	Goalkeeper	2010–2011	38	0	
David Healy	Northern Ireland+	Forward	2010	12	1	
Josh Carson	Northern Ireland+	Midfielder	2011–2012	33	5	
Aaron Cresswell	England	Full back	2011–2014	138	7	
Keith Andrews	Republic of Ireland+	Midfielder	2011	20	9	
Luke Chambers	England	Defender	2012–2021	396	19	
David McGoldrick	Republic of Ireland+	Forward	2013–2018	159	45	
Christophe Berra	Scotland+	Defender	2013–2017	185	14	
Cole Skuse	England	Midfielder	2013–2021	278	2	
Dean Gerken	England	Goalkeeper	2013–2019	113	0	
Kévin Bru	Mauritius+	Midfielder	2014–2018	103	4	
Bartosz Białkowski	Poland+	Goalkeeper	2014–2020	178	0	
Jonny Williams	Wales+	Midfielder	2014–2015; 2016	28	2	
Freddie Sears	England	Forward	2015–2021	218	34	
Jonas Knudsen	Denmark+	Defender	2015–2019	155	4	
Tom Lawrence	Wales+	Winger	2016–2017	36	11	
Emyr Huws	Wales+	Midfielder	2017–2021	55	5	
Bersant Celina	Kosovo+	Midfielder	2017–2018; 2021–2022	73	14	
Monty Patterson	New Zealand+	Forward	2016–2018	1	0	
Cameron Carter-Vickers	United States+	Defender	2018	17	0	
Alan Judge	Republic of Ireland+	Midfielder	2019–2021	91	8	
Idris El Mizouni	Tunisia+	Midfielder	2019–	26	2	
Anthony Georgiou	Cyprus+	Midfielder	2019	13	0	
Teddy Bishop	England	Midfielder	2014–2021	132	5	
Troy Parrott	Republic of Ireland+	Forward	2021	18	2	
Gwion Edwards	Wales	Midfielder	2018–2021	109	14	
Myles Kenlock	England	Defender	2015–2022	103	0	
Kayden Jackson	England	Forward	2018–2024	199	28	
Elkan Baggott	Indonesia+	Defender	2020–	7	1	
Luke Woolfenden	England	Defender	2017–	201	5	
Wes Burns	Wales+	Midfielder	2021–	134	28	
Janoi Donacien	Saint Lucia+	Defender	2018–	127	0	
Nathan Broadhead	Wales+	Forward	2023–	62	21	
Conor Chaplin	England	Forward	2021–	156	54	
Sam Morsy	Egypt+	Midfielder	2021–	140	11	
Cameron Burgess	Australia+	Defender	2021–	109	5	
Massimo Luongo	Australia+	Midfielder	2012; 2023–	76	6	
Kieffer Moore	Wales+	Forward	2017–2018; 2024	29	7	
Jeremy Sarmiento	Ecuador+	Midfielder	2024	22	4	
Axel Tuanzebe	DR Congo+	Defender	2023–	28	1	
Ali Al-Hamadi	Iraq+	Forward	2024–	18	5	
Arijanet Muric	Kosovo+	Goalkeeper	2024–	9	0	
Sammie Szmodics	Republic of Ireland+	Forward	2024–	10	2	
Dara O'Shea	Republic of Ireland+	Defender	2024–	8	0	
Chiedozie Ogbene	Republic of Ireland+	Midfielder	2024–	6	0	
Jack Taylor	Republic of Ireland+	Midfielder	2023–	46	5	
Leif Davis	England	Defender	2022–	100	6	

== Club captains ==
Below lists the club captains of Ipswich Town since the club turned professional in 1936. The club's first professional captain was Jimmy McLuckie, who captained the club from 1936 to 1945. Mick Mills has made the highest number of appearances as Ipswich Town captain, having captained the club for 11 years between 1971 and 1982. The club's current captain is Luke Chambers, who has held the captaincy since 2014, after Carlos Edwards left the club. In July 2021, Chambers left Ipswich after making close to 400 appearances in 9 years at the club, having been club captain since 2014. Following Chambers' departure, new signing Sam Morsy was named club captain in October 2021.

Dates	Name
1936–1945	(Scotland) Jimmy McLuckie^{[B]}
1945–1946	Unknown
1946–1957	(England) Tommy Parker
1957–1961	(England) Reg Pickett
1961–1962	(England) Andy Nelson
1962–1971	(Scotland) Billy Baxter
1971–1982	(England) Mick Mills^{[K]}
1982–1986	(England) Terry Butcher
1986–1988	(England) Ian Atkins
1988–1991	(Netherlands) Romeo Zondervan
1991–1993	(Scotland) John Wark
1993–1995	(England) Steve Palmer
1995–1998	(England) Tony Mowbray
1998–2003	(Republic of Ireland) Matt Holland
2003–2006	(Northern Ireland) Jim Magilton
2006–2008	(Canada) Jason de Vos
2008–2009	(England) Richard Naylor
2009	(Northern Ireland) Gareth McAuley
2009–2010	(Republic of Ireland) Alex Bruce
2010	(Republic of Ireland) Jonathan Walters
2010–2011	(England) David Norris
2011–2012	(England) Grant Leadbitter
2012–2014	(Trinidad and Tobago) Carlos Edwards
2014–2021	(England) Luke Chambers
2021	(Wales) Lee Evans
2021–2025	(Egypt) Sam Morsy
2025-	(Republic of Ireland) Dara O'Shea

== Player, Manager & Team awards ==
=== PFA Team of the Year ===
The following have been included in the PFA Team of the Year whilst playing for Ipswich Town:

- 1974–75 First Division: (England) Kevin Beattie
- 1975–76 First Division: (England) Kevin Beattie
- 1976–77 First Division: (England) Kevin Beattie, (England) Mick Mills, (England) Brian Talbot
- 1980–81 First Division: (England) Russell Osman, (Netherlands) Frans Thijssen, (Scotland) John Wark, (England) Paul Mariner
- 1991–92 Second Division: (England) David Linighan
- 1997–98 First Division: (England) Kieron Dyer, (Argentina) Mauricio Taricco
- 1998–99 First Division: (England) Richard Wright, (England) Mark Venus, (England) Kieron Dyer
- 1999–2000 First Division: (England) Richard Wright, (England) Marcus Stewart
- 2004–05 Championship: (England) Kelvin Davis
- 2013–14 Championship: (England) Aaron Cresswell
- 2014–15 Championship: (Republic of Ireland) Daryl Murphy
- 2022–23 League One: (England) Leif Davis, (Egypt) Sam Morsy, (England) Conor Chaplin

=== PFA Players' Player of the Year ===
The following have won the PFA Players' Player of the Year award whilst playing for Ipswich Town:

- 1980–81: (Scotland) John Wark

=== PFA Young Player of the Year ===
The following have won the PFA Young Player of the Year award whilst playing for Ipswich Town:

- 1973–74: (England) Kevin Beattie

=== FWA Footballer of the Year ===
The following have won the FWA Footballer of the Year award whilst playing for Ipswich Town:

- 1980–81: (Netherlands) Frans Thijssen

=== Bravo Award ===
The following have won the Bravo Award whilst playing for Ipswich Town:

- 1980–81: (Scotland) John Wark

=== PFA Fans' Favourite ===
The following player was selected as the PFA Fans' Favourite for Ipswich Town as part of the celebrations of the centenary of the Professional Footballers' Association in 2007:

- (Scotland) John Wark

=== PFA League One Player of the Year ===
The following have won the PFA League One Player of the Year award whilst playing for Ipswich Town:

- 2022–23: (England) Conor Chaplin

=== PFA Fans' Championship Player of the Year ===
The following have won the PFA Fans' Championship Player of the Year award whilst playing for Ipswich Town:

- 2023–24: (Egypt) Sam Morsy

=== Football League Awards ===
==== Football League Young Player of the Year ====
The following have won the Football League Young Player of the Year award whilst playing for Ipswich Town:

- 2011: (England) Connor Wickham

==== Championship Apprentice Award ====
The following have won the Championship Apprentice Award whilst playing for Ipswich Town:

- 2011: (England) Connor Wickham

==== League One Team of the Season ====
The following have been included in the League One Team of the Season whilst playing for Ipswich Town:

- 2021–22: (Wales) Wes Burns
- 2022–23: (England) Leif Davis, (England) Conor Chaplin

==== Championship Team of the Season ====
The following have been included in the Championship Team of the Season whilst playing for Ipswich Town:

- 2023–24: (England) Leif Davis

==== Championship Goal of the Season ====
The following have won the Championship Goal of the Season award whilst playing for Ipswich Town:

- 2023–24: (Wales) Wes Burns

=== Managerial awards ===
==== LMA Manager of the Year ====
The following have won the LMA Manager of the Year award whilst managing Ipswich Town:

- 2000–01: (Scotland) George Burley
- 2023–24: (Northern Ireland) Kieran McKenna

==== LMA Championship Manager of the Season ====
The following have won the LMA Championship Manager of the Season award whilst managing Ipswich Town:

- 2023–24: (Northern Ireland) Kieran McKenna

==== Premier League Manager of the Season ====
The following have won the Premier League Manager of the Season award whilst managing Ipswich Town:

- 2000–01: (Scotland) George Burley

==== Championship Manager of the Season ====
The following have won the Championship Manager of the Season award whilst managing Ipswich Town:

- 2023–24: (Northern Ireland) Kieran McKenna

=== Team awards ===
==== France Football European Team of the Year ====
- 1981: (England) Ipswich Town

== Footnotes ==
- ^{A} For a full description of positions see Football Positions
- ^{B} Jimmy McLuckie was Ipswich Town's first professional captain.
- ^{C} Billy Reed was the first Ipswich player to receive full international honours while registered for the club, playing for Wales.
- ^{D} Ted Phillips scored the most goals in a season for Ipswich, with 41 in the 1956–57 season.
- ^{E} Ray Crawford is the club's all-time goal scorer with 203 goals between 1958 and 1969.
- ^{F} Mick Mills is the all-time appearance record-holder.
- ^{G} Allan Hunter is the club's most capped player with 47 appearances for Northern Ireland.
- ^{H} John Wark was the PFA Player of the Year in 1981.
- ^{I} Matteo Sereni is the club's record transfer purchase, £4,500,000, from Italian club Empoli.
- ^{J} Connor Wickham is the club's record transfer sale, £8,100,000, to Sunderland.
- ^{K} Mick Mills is the longest serving Ipswich Town captain.
