= Leonard Garrett =

English cricketer

Personal information
- Full name: Leonard George Garrett
- Date of birth: 14 May 1936
- Place of birth: Hackney, London, England
- Date of death: 15 March 2011 (aged 74)
- Place of death: Dordogne, France
- Position: Fullback

Senior career*
Years	Team	Apps	(Gls)
????–1954	Eton Manor		
1954–1958	Arsenal	0	(0)
1958–1961	Ipswich Town	1	(0)
1961–????	Haverhill Rovers		
Total		1	(0)
- * Club domestic league appearances and goals

Leonard George Garrett (14 May 1936 – 15 March 2011) was an English professional footballer and minor counties cricketer.

Garrett was born in Hackney. After playing for Eton Manor, he joined Arsenal in 1954, but did not feature for the club in any first team matches. He was sold to Ipswich Town for £200 in 1958, featuring in just one first team match for the club. He left Ipswich in 1961, joining Haverhill Rovers.

Garrett also played cricket at minor counties level for Suffolk, albeit intermittently, from 1960 to 1973, making seven appearances in the Minor Counties Championship. He later emigrated to France, where he died in the Dordogne in March 2011.
