= Wendy Piatt =

Dr Wendy Piatt

Personal details
- Born: 17 November 1970 (age 55)
- Education: King's College London; University of Oxford

Wendy Louisa Piatt (born 17 November 1970) is the former chief executive officer of Gresham College.

== Life ==
Piatt was born in Birkenhead, in the Wirral, and went to convent school there.

She was awarded a first class honours BA in English from King's College London before studying for an MPhil in Shakespeare and Renaissance drama and then a D.Phil at Lincoln College, Oxford. Her thesis was entitled "Politics and religion in Renaissance closet drama".

== Employment ==
Piatt went on to work for the left-of-centre think-tank the Institute for Public Policy Research, where she was Head of Education. She then joined the Prime Minister's Strategy Unit, where she rose to the post of deputy director.

In January 2007, she was appointed Director General of the Russell Group. In December 2016 it was announced that she would step down from her position, despite having been cleared after an internal investigation into her travel and expenses. She stepped down on 1 February 2017.

She is a board member of the Snowdon Trust, founded by the Earl of Snowdon, which provides grants and scholarships for students with disabilities.

In June 2020 she was appointed as the first CEO of Gresham College with effect from August 2020.
