= Neil Myles =

Scottish footballer (1927–1993)

Personal information
- Full name: Neil Thomson Myles
- Date of birth: 17 June 1927
- Place of birth: Falkirk, Scotland
- Date of death: 15 November 1993 (aged 66)
- Place of death: Ipswich, England
- Position: Wing half

Senior career*
Years	Team	Apps	(Gls)
1948–49	Third Lanark	1	(0)
1949–60	Ipswich Town	223	(15)
- Clacton Town
Total		224	(15)
- * Club domestic league appearances and goals

Neil Thomson Myles (17 June 1927 – 15 November 1993) was a Scottish professional footballer. During his career he made over 200 appearances for Ipswich Town between 1949 and 1960.
