= Emma Obanye =

British businesswoman

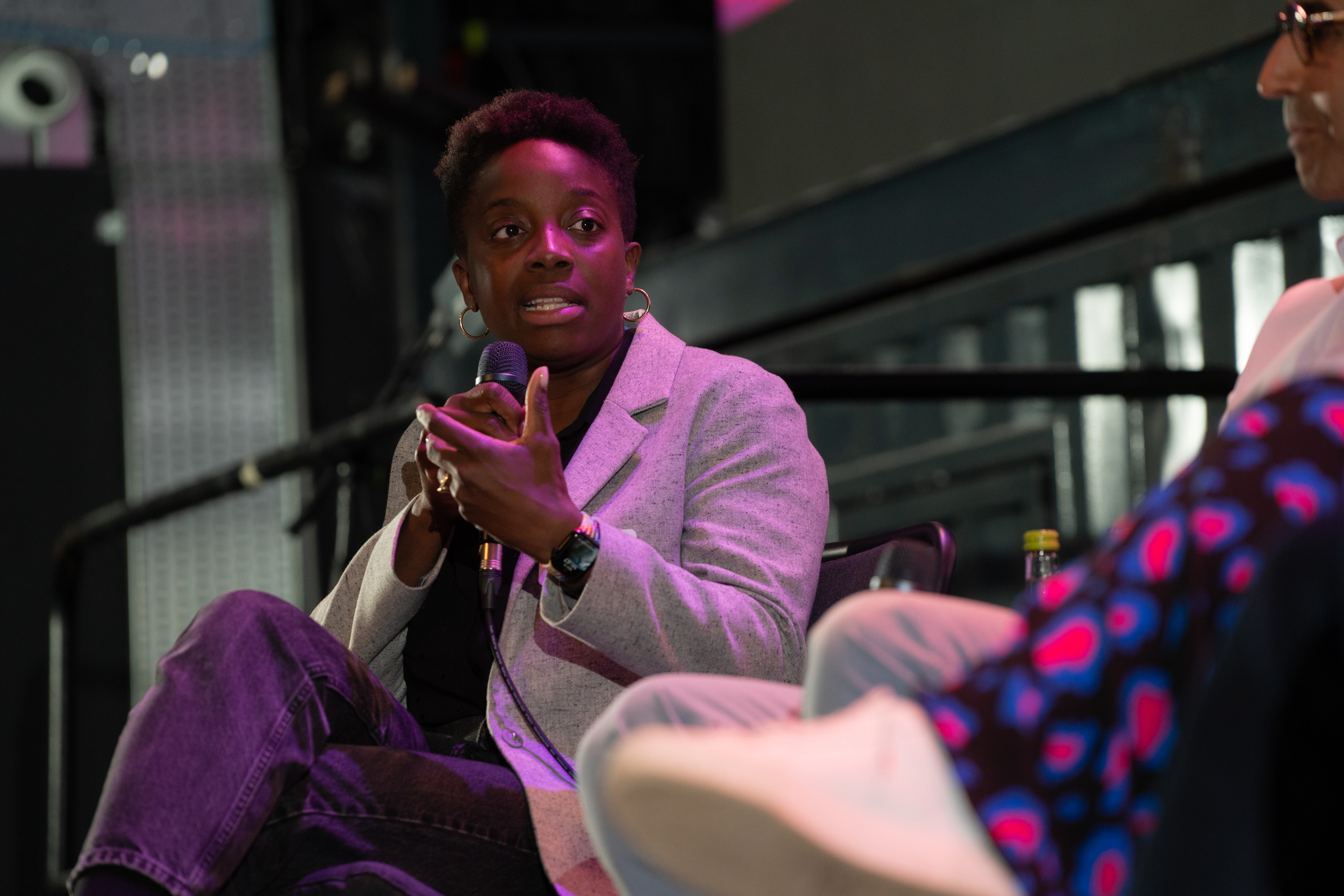
- Obanye in 2023
- Born: 1982 (age 43–44); Leeds, West Yorkshire, England
- Education: Brunel University London; Queen Mary University of London
- Occupation: Businesswoman
- Known for: OneTech, BuddyBounce
- Website: emmaobanye.com

Emma Joy Obanye (born 1982) is a British businesswoman and serial entrepreneur. She is the founder and CEO of OneTech, a support program for entrepreneurs from underserved backgrounds, and co-founder of BuddyBounce, an "idolisation dashboard," which was acquired by Crowdmix in 2016.

== Early life ==
Obanye grew up in Hackney, London, one of four children to a single mother. She studied engineering at Brunel University London and ecommerce at Queen Mary University of London.

== Career ==
In April 2013, Obanye and friend Giulia Piu founded BuddyBounce, a "music-focused loyalty and influencer platform... [which] connect[s] fans, bands and brands." The "idolisation dashboard" was acquired by CrowdMix in 2016. She went through a depressive episode over the next three years, coping with the loss of identity that came with leaving BuddyBounce. She used this experience to discuss the lack of support for founders when their company. In October 2018, she co-founded OneTech, a startup that helps connect tech and digital startups with venture capitalists and industry experts and provides resources such as training sessions and networking opportunities. While OneTech initially focused on "seed-stage tech startups with diverse founders," they have since broadened their scope to support diverse founders at all stages of the startup process. Originally established in London with the support of JPMorgan Chase, OneTech spun out from its mother company, Capital Enterprise, in May 2023. Obanye's other ventures include Mindful Team, a platform to measure and improve team culture; The Retrospective Game, card games for teams; and Journe, a platform to "share knowledge recipes." She is also the digital co-director of the climate education organisation Mind & Planet.

In 2019, Financial Times named her among the 100 BAME leaders influencing the tech sector.

== Personal life ==
After BuddyBounce was acquired in 2016, Obanye and her husband lived in Thailand for a few months before moving to Barcelona. They have twin sons and have returned to England. Obanye is a big fan of Manchester United.
