= Jabez Whitley =

The Right Reverend Jabez Cornelius Whitley (20 January 1837 – 13 October 1904) was an Anglican author and a bishop in India from 1890 until 1904.

He was born in London on 20 January 1837 and educated at Queens' College, Cambridge and ordained in 1861. He was an SPG Missionary in Delhi and then Ranchi before his elevation to the episcopate as the inaugural Bishop of Chota Nagpur. He died on 13 October 1904.

== Works ==
- Primer of the Mundari Language, 1896
- Hindi Catechisms, 1897
- Translation of the Didache and the Epistles of St Ignatius, 1899

== Notes ==
Church of England titles
Preceded by Inaugural appointment	Bishop of Chota Nagpur; 1890–1904	Succeeded by Foss Westcott
