= Jimmy McLuckie =

Scottish footballer

Personal information
- Full name: Jimmy McLuckie
- Date of birth: 2 April 1908
- Place of birth: Stonehouse, Scotland
- Date of death: 1986 (aged 77–78)
- Position: Wing half

Senior career*
Years	Team	Apps	(Gls)
1933–1934	Manchester City	32	(1)
1934–1936	Aston Villa	15	(1)
1936–1945	Ipswich Town	100	(10)
- → Chelmsford City (guest)

International career
1933	Scotland	1	(0)
- * Club domestic league appearances and goals

Jimmy McLuckie (2 April 1908 – 1986) was a Scottish professional footballer. During his career, he made over 100 appearances for Ipswich Town.
