= Carol Adams (educator) =

English educationist

- Born: 28 July 1948; Hackney, East London
- Died: 11 January 2007 (aged 58)
- Occupations: Teacher; writer
- Known for: GTCE; Teacher Learning Academy

Carol Adams (28 July 1948 - 11 January 2007) was a history teacher who was the first Chief Executive of the General Teaching Council for England (GTCE), bringing England in line with Scotland and Wales who had had teaching regulatory bodies since 1966. Adams established the organisation (which was not welcomed by some in the profession) as a regulatory body and for professional development organisation, and which was consulted by government, from its foundation in 2000 until it covered over 500,000 teachers, before she retired in late 2006.

== Education ==
Born into a close working-class family in Hackney, East London, when she was 11 years old Adams won a scholarship to Christ's Hospital Girls School in Hertford. She read history at Warwick University in the 1960s enjoying some time at the University of California, Berkeley. She studied her PGCE at the University of London, taking an MA in Human Rights at the Institute of Education in the early 80s.

== Early career ==
Adams taught history and humanities for five years at inner London secondary schools. From here, she moved to the Tower of London where she managed education programmes for schools. From 1980 until 1983 she took over as Warden at the specialist History and Social Sciences Teachers' Centre where she "encouraged teachers to produce learning materials that were more culturally diverse and that included women's history". In the 1980s, Adams became the country's first Inspector for Equal Opportunities at the Inner London Education Authority. When ILEA closed, she became Assistant Chief Education Officer in Haringey, North London, where she was responsible for all equality issues, working especially hard to develop the careers of black teachers. In 1990, she became Chief Education Officer in Wolverhampton, moving to Shropshire four years later.

== Writing ==
Adams wrote books for students, including co-authoring - published in three volumes in the mid-70s - which was aimed at schoolgirls and explained how sexism limited female opportunities. also co-edited the Women in History series for Cambridge University Press, which brought the women's movement into the classroom. She captured the lives of medieval women, as well as life in a 19th-century silk factory. She was on the original editorial advisory board of the feminist publishing company, Virago.

== General Teaching Council for England ==
Adams joined the GTCE as its first Chief Executive in 2000, steering its development from a fledgling council to a mature organisation. A passionate advocate for teachers and teaching, Carol made access to sustained and effective professional development a central focus of the GTCE's work. Among the key highlights of Adams's time at the GTCE was the launch and development of the GTCE-led Teacher Learning Academy, which offers teachers professional recognition for the learning and development that takes place in schools.

There was controversy between the HM Inspectorate of Schools and the Local Authorities on the handling of incompetent teachers in England, and CEO Adams had to steer a path between these viewpoints and ensure that GTCE's role was clearly understood and legally adhered to by the 150 employers organisations, to enhance teachers' professional standards and to address any behavioural issues, effectively, and a code of conduct was agreed. The profession was said to have low morale, with a survey identifying that up to a third were seeking to leave.

Adams presented recommendations to enhance the trust given to teacher's assessment of student's progress, and professional development plans to assist staff in this area. Adams continued to campaign for equality throughout her career. In every facet of her work at the GTCE she ensured that the Council focused on raising achievement for all pupils, regardless of background. In 2006, she was delighted to be appointed as a Commissioner for the Equality and Human Rights Commission.

Reflecting her commitment towards teachers' professional development, equality and diversity, since 2008 the GTCE has bestowed annual awards in Adam's honour. Given to teachers who demonstrate excellence in these fields, the winners are chosen from the wider Teaching Awards regional finalists, as the best exemplars of good practice in the profession.

== Personal life ==
Adams was a keen jazz fan, playing the clarinet and saxophone in two jazz bands. She also enjoyed swimming, tennis, dancing and travel. She had two children.
