= General Teaching Council for England =

Former professional body for teaching in England

Logo of the General Teaching Council for England

The General Teaching Council for England (GTCE) was the professional body for teaching in England between 2000 and 2012. The GTC was established by the Teaching and Higher Education Act 1998 which set two aims: "to contribute to improving standards of teaching and the quality of learning, and to maintain and improve standards of professional conduct among teachers, in the interests of the public". The GTC was abolished in 2012 with some of its functions being assumed by the Teaching Agency, an executive agency of the Department for Education, which in 2013 became the National College for Teaching and Leadership.

== Functions ==
In line with the aims set by the Teaching and Higher Education Act 1998, the GTC had three principal functions.

=== Maintaining a register of teachers in England ===
The GTC was the awarding body for Qualified Teacher Status (QTS) in England. Registration with the GTC was a legal requirement for all qualified teachers in maintained schools, pupil referral units and non-maintained special schools. In addition, around a third of teachers in the independent sector were registered with the GTC. There were over 560,000 teachers on the GTC register.

=== Regulating the teaching profession ===
The GTC published the Code of Conduct and Practice for Teachers. This code formed the basis of the regulatory process of the GTC. The GTC regulated the conduct and competence of teachers according to this code. Teachers' employers were required to tell the GTC when a teacher had been dismissed because of misconduct or incompetence or where they resigned in circumstances justifying dismissal.

The GTC regulated all "Registered Teachers", in other words any teacher working in maintained ) schools. The GTC could also regulate teachers who were no longer registered provided misconduct or incompetence occurred when they were registered.

The GTC convened panels to hear cases. Each panel was normally held in public, and included two teachers, one lay member, and a legal advisor employed by the GTC. Panels were drawn from members of the Council plus a pool of specially appointed panellists. The GTC employed a presenting officer who was often a leading solicitor in the field of Professional Discipline. A panel had the powers to issue reprimands, issue a conditional registration order (continued GTC registration required the teacher to adhere to certain conditions set at the hearing), suspend a teacher from the register, or prohibit a teacher from registration

The GTC did not pay costs to teachers found not guilty of misconduct at hearings. Legal representation at hearings could cost up to £40,000. Some teachers were represented by trade unions, although Trade Unions employ solicitors and barristers to comply with the Human Rights legislation affording defendants equal representation to the barristers and solicitors employed by the GTCE.

=== Providing advice to government and other agencies ===
The GTC gave advice to government and others on a wide range of policy issues that affect the teaching profession including issues relating to standards of teaching and learning. Advice had previously been given on topics including: supporting the professional development of teachers; pupil assessment; teacher retention, and prevention of teachers leaving the profession; equality and diversity in schools and the workforce; working with other (non-teaching) adults in schools; teacher and school accountability; supporting teachers to effectively teach children with Special Educational Needs

=== Legal requirement ===
Being fully registered with the GTC was a legal requirement if you were employed in the maintained sector. Those qualified teachers working in independent schools could register voluntarily.

== Composition of the council ==
The GTC had 64 members. Elections to the council were made on a four-year cycle, except the chair and vice chair of the council, which were elected annually. The GTC convened four times a year to discuss policy and regulation of the teaching profession. The GTC was composed of:

- 25 members elected from GTC registered teachers
- 9 members who are nominated by professional teaching organisations and trade unions
- 17 members nominated through other teaching related organisations
- 13 members nominated the GTC's public appointments procedure

The Council's first Chief Executive from 2000 until 2006 was educationalist Carol Adams.

== Collections ==
The archives of the GTC and the GTC Trust are held in the archives of the Institute of Education, University College London. The collection includes correspondence, records of meetings, publications and information about the GTC's positions on issues.

== Abolition ==
The Secretary of State for Education, Michael Gove, announced on 2 June 2010 of the Government's decision and intention to abolish the General Teaching Council for England by primary legislation.

The Times Educational Supplement lamented the demise of the GTC and criticised the role of school teaching trade unions causing the profession to become little more than an extension to the civil service.
