= 1961 in association football =

The following are the football (soccer) events of the year 1961 throughout the world.

== Events ==
- Copa Libertadores 1961: Won by Peñarol after defeating Palmeiras on an aggregate score of 2–1.
- 1961 International Soccer League
  - Dukla Prague beat Everton F.C., 9–2, in the final on aggregate
- September 6 – Dutch club Feyenoord from Rotterdam makes its European debut by defeating Sweden's IFK Göteborg (0–3) in the first round of the European Cup.
- September 18 – The North American Football Confederation and Football Confederation of Central America and the Caribbean merge to form CONCACAF.

== Winners club national championship ==
- Argentina: Racing Club
- Brazil: Santos
- England: Tottenham Hotspur
- France: AS Monaco
- Iceland: KR
- Italy: Juventus
- Mexico: Chivas Guadalajara
- Netherlands: Feyenoord
- Paraguay: Cerro Porteño
- Romania: Steaua București
- Scotland: Rangers
- Soviet Union: FC Dynamo Kyiv
- Spain: Real Madrid
- Turkey: Fenerbahçe

== International tournaments ==
- 1961 British Home Championship (October 8, 1960 – April 15, 1961)

England

== Births ==
- January 12 – Andrea Carnevale, Italian international footballer
- January 13 – César Baena, Venezuelan international footballer
- January 17 – Zhao Dayu, Chinese international footballer (died 2015)
- January 18 – Peter Beardsley, English international footballer
- January 20 – Patricio Yáñez, Chilean international footballer
- January 31 – Jonny Otten, German international footballer.
- February 13 – Oļegs Karavajevs, Latvian international footballer
- March 13 – Sebastiano Nela, Italian international footballer
- March 21 – Lothar Matthäus, German international footballer and manager
- April 4 – Karsten Härtel, former German footballer
- April 6 – Tony Paul, English former professional footballer
- April 11 – Roberto Cabañas, Paraguayan international footballer (died 2017)
- April 19 – Dave Wiffill, English former professional footballer and coach
- May 3 – Daniel Sánchez, Uruguayan international footballer
- May 5 – Ali Hussein Shihab, Iraqi international footballer (died 2016)
- May 8 – Gert Kruys, Dutch footballer and manager
- May 21 – Thomas Dooley, American international footballer and manager
- June 1 – Rubén Espinoza, Chilean footballer
- June 3 – César Zabala, Paraguayan international footballer (died 2020)
- June 27 – Pat McQuillan, Northern Irish former footballer
- June 29 – Víctor Genés, Paraguayan footballer and football manager (died 2019)
- August 1 – Danny Blind, Dutch international footballer and manager
- August 10 – Chris Marustik, Welsh international footballer (died 2015)
- August 24 – Nick Hencher, Welsh former professional footballer
- September 9 – Justo Jacquet, Paraguayan footballer
- September 20 – Erwin Koeman, Dutch international footballer and manager
- October 16 – Wilfried Brookhuis, Dutch footballer
- October 20 – Guillermo Muñoz, Mexican footballer
- November 3 – Sven Habermann, German-Canadian soccer player
- November 4 – Nigel Worthington, Northern Irish international footballer and manager
- November 17 – Wolfram Wuttke, German international footballer (died 2015)
- November 20 – Dave Watson, English footballer and manager
- December 5 – Alan Davies, Welsh international footballer (died 1992)
- December 9 – Luděk Mikloško, Czech international footballer and coach (died 2026)
- December 17 – Henk van Stee, Dutch footballer and manager

== Deaths ==
=== January ===
- January 5 – Jack Butler (66), English international footballer and manager (born 1894)

=== October ===
- October 31 – Alberto Chividini, Argentine defender, runner up of the 1930 FIFA World Cup . (54)
