= 1960–61 Football League =

62nd season of the Football League

The Football League
- Season: 1960–61
- Champions: Tottenham Hotspur
- New Club in League: Peterborough United

The 1960–61 season was the 62nd completed season of The Football League.

== First Division ==
First Division
- Season: 1960–61
- Champions: Tottenham Hotspur; 2nd English title
- Relegated: Newcastle United; Preston North End
- European Cup: Tottenham Hotspur
- Cup Winners' Cup: Leicester City
- Inter-Cities Fairs Cup: Sheffield Wednesday; Nottingham Forest; Birmingham City
- Matches: 462
- Goals: 1,724 (3.73 per match)
- Top goalscorer: Jimmy Greaves (41 goals)

| Pos | Team | Pld | W | D | L | GF | GA | GAv | Pts | Qualification or relegation |
|---|---|---|---|---|---|---|---|---|---|---|
| 1 | Tottenham Hotspur (C) | 42 | 31 | 4 | 7 | 115 | 55 | 2.091 | 66 | Qualification for the European Cup preliminary round |
| 2 | Sheffield Wednesday | 42 | 23 | 12 | 7 | 78 | 47 | 1.660 | 58 | Qualification for the Inter-Cities Fairs Cup first round |
| 3 | Wolverhampton Wanderers | 42 | 25 | 7 | 10 | 103 | 75 | 1.373 | 57 | |
| 4 | Burnley | 42 | 22 | 7 | 13 | 102 | 77 | 1.325 | 51 | |
| 5 | Everton | 42 | 22 | 6 | 14 | 87 | 69 | 1.261 | 50 | |
| 6 | Leicester City | 42 | 18 | 9 | 15 | 87 | 70 | 1.243 | 45 | Qualification for the European Cup Winners' Cup preliminary round (Note: Leicester City qualified for the Cup Winners' Cup preliminary round as the 1960–61 FA Cup runners-up, since the winners, Tottenham Hotspur, had already qualified for the European Cup.) |
| 7 | Manchester United | 42 | 18 | 9 | 15 | 88 | 76 | 1.158 | 45 | |
| 8 | Blackburn Rovers | 42 | 15 | 13 | 14 | 77 | 76 | 1.013 | 43 | |
| 9 | Aston Villa | 42 | 17 | 9 | 16 | 78 | 77 | 1.013 | 43 | |
| 10 | West Bromwich Albion | 42 | 18 | 5 | 19 | 67 | 71 | 0.944 | 41 | |
| 11 | Arsenal | 42 | 15 | 11 | 16 | 77 | 85 | 0.906 | 41 | |
| 12 | Chelsea | 42 | 15 | 7 | 20 | 98 | 100 | 0.980 | 37 | |
| 13 | Manchester City | 42 | 13 | 11 | 18 | 79 | 90 | 0.878 | 37 | |
| 14 | Nottingham Forest | 42 | 14 | 9 | 19 | 62 | 78 | 0.795 | 37 | Qualification for the Inter-Cities Fairs Cup first round |
| 15 | Cardiff City | 42 | 13 | 11 | 18 | 60 | 85 | 0.706 | 37 | |
| 16 | West Ham United | 42 | 13 | 10 | 19 | 77 | 88 | 0.875 | 36 | |
| 17 | Fulham | 42 | 14 | 8 | 20 | 72 | 95 | 0.758 | 36 | |
| 18 | Bolton Wanderers | 42 | 12 | 11 | 19 | 58 | 73 | 0.795 | 35 | |
| 19 | Birmingham City | 42 | 14 | 6 | 22 | 62 | 84 | 0.738 | 34 | Qualification for the Inter-Cities Fairs Cup second round |
| 20 | Blackpool | 42 | 12 | 9 | 21 | 68 | 73 | 0.932 | 33 | |
| 21 | Newcastle United (R) | 42 | 11 | 10 | 21 | 86 | 109 | 0.789 | 32 | Relegation to the Second Division |
| 22 | Preston North End (R) | 42 | 10 | 10 | 22 | 43 | 71 | 0.606 | 30 | Relegation to the Second Division |

Source: World Football
Rules for classification: 1) Points; 2) Goal average; 3) Goals scored
(C) Champions; (R) Relegated

=== Results ===
| Home \ Away | ARS | AST | BIR | BLB | BLP | BOL | BUR | CAR | CHE | EVE | FUL | LEI | MCI | MUN | NEW | NOT | PNE | SHW | TOT | WBA | WHU | WOL |
|---|---|---|---|---|---|---|---|---|---|---|---|---|---|---|---|---|---|---|---|---|---|---|
| Arsenal | | 2–1 | 2–0 | 0–0 | 1–0 | 5–1 | 2–5 | 2–3 | 1–4 | 3–2 | 4–2 | 1–3 | 5–4 | 2–1 | 5–0 | 3–0 | 1–0 | 1–1 | 2–3 | 1–0 | 0–0 | 1–5 |
| Aston Villa | 2–2 | | 6–2 | 2–2 | 2–2 | 4–0 | 2–0 | 2–1 | 3–2 | 3–2 | 2–1 | 1–3 | 5–1 | 3–1 | 2–0 | 1–2 | 1–0 | 4–1 | 1–2 | 0–1 | 2–1 | 0–2 |
| Birmingham City | 2–0 | 1–1 | | 1–1 | 0–2 | 2–2 | 0–1 | 2–1 | 1–0 | 2–4 | 1–0 | 0–2 | 3–2 | 3–1 | 2–1 | 3–1 | 1–3 | 1–1 | 2–3 | 3–1 | 4–2 | 1–2 |
| Blackburn Rovers | 2–4 | 4–1 | 2–0 | | 2–0 | 3–1 | 1–4 | 2–2 | 3–1 | 1–3 | 5–1 | 1–1 | 4–1 | 1–2 | 2–4 | 4–1 | 1–0 | 1–1 | 1–4 | 2–1 | 4–1 | 2–1 |
| Blackpool | 1–1 | 5–3 | 1–2 | 2–0 | | 0–1 | 0–0 | 6–1 | 1–4 | 1–4 | 2–5 | 5–1 | 3–3 | 2–0 | 2–1 | 4–0 | 0–1 | 0–1 | 1–3 | 0–1 | 3–0 | 5–2 |
| Bolton Wanderers | 1–1 | 3–0 | 2–2 | 0–0 | 3–1 | | 3–5 | 3–0 | 4–1 | 3–4 | 0–3 | 2–0 | 3–1 | 1–1 | 2–1 | 3–1 | 1–1 | 0–1 | 1–2 | 0–1 | 3–1 | 0–2 |
| Burnley | 3–2 | 1–1 | 2–1 | 1–1 | 1–2 | 2–0 | | 1–2 | 4–4 | 1–3 | 5–0 | 3–2 | 1–3 | 5–3 | 5–3 | 4–1 | 5–0 | 3–4 | 4–2 | 0–1 | 2–2 | 5–3 |
| Cardiff City | 1–0 | 1–1 | 0–2 | 1–1 | 0–2 | 0–1 | 2–1 | | 2–1 | 1–1 | 2–0 | 2–1 | 3–3 | 3–0 | 3–2 | 1–3 | 2–0 | 0–1 | 3–2 | 3–1 | 1–1 | 3–2 |
| Chelsea | 3–1 | 2–4 | 3–2 | 5–2 | 2–2 | 1–1 | 2–6 | 6–1 | | 3–3 | 2–1 | 1–3 | 6–3 | 1–2 | 4–2 | 4–3 | 1–1 | 0–2 | 2–3 | 7–1 | 3–2 | 3–3 |
| Everton | 4–1 | 1–2 | 1–0 | 2–2 | 1–0 | 1–2 | 0–3 | 5–1 | 1–1 | | 1–0 | 3–1 | 4–2 | 4–0 | 5–0 | 1–0 | 0–0 | 4–2 | 1–3 | 1–1 | 4–1 | 3–1 |
| Fulham | 2–2 | 1–1 | 2–1 | 1–1 | 4–3 | 2–2 | 0–1 | 2–2 | 3–2 | 2–3 | | 4–2 | 1–0 | 4–4 | 4–3 | 1–0 | 2–0 | 1–6 | 0–0 | 1–2 | 1–1 | 1–3 |
| Leicester City | 2–1 | 3–1 | 3–2 | 2–4 | 1–1 | 2–0 | 2–2 | 3–0 | 1–3 | 4–1 | 1–2 | | 1–2 | 6–0 | 5–3 | 1–1 | 5–2 | 2–1 | 1–2 | 2–2 | 5–1 | 2–0 |
| Manchester City | 0–0 | 4–1 | 2–1 | 4–0 | 1–1 | 0–0 | 2–1 | 4–2 | 2–1 | 2–1 | 3–2 | 3–1 | | 1–3 | 3–3 | 1–2 | 2–3 | 1–1 | 0–1 | 3–0 | 1–2 | 2–4 |
| Manchester United | 1–1 | 1–1 | 4–1 | 1–3 | 2–0 | 3–1 | 6–0 | 3–3 | 6–0 | 4–0 | 3–1 | 1–1 | 5–1 | | 3–2 | 2–1 | 1–0 | 0–0 | 2–0 | 3–0 | 6–1 | 1–3 |
| Newcastle United | 3–3 | 2–1 | 2–2 | 3–1 | 4–3 | 4–1 | 0–1 | 5–0 | 1–6 | 0–4 | 7–2 | 1–3 | 1–3 | 1–1 | | 2–2 | 0–0 | 0–1 | 3–4 | 3–2 | 5–5 | 4–4 |
| Nottingham Forest | 3–5 | 2–0 | 1–0 | 1–1 | 0–0 | 2–2 | 3–1 | 2–1 | 2–1 | 1–2 | 4–2 | 2–2 | 2–2 | 3–2 | 0–2 | | 2–0 | 1–2 | 0–4 | 1–2 | 1–1 | 1–1 |
| Preston North End | 2–0 | 1–1 | 2–3 | 2–0 | 1–0 | 0–0 | 2–3 | 1–1 | 0–2 | 1–0 | 2–0 | 0–0 | 1–1 | 2–4 | 2–3 | 0–1 | | 2–2 | 0–1 | 2–1 | 4–0 | 1–2 |
| Sheffield Wednesday | 1–1 | 1–2 | 2–0 | 5–4 | 4–0 | 2–0 | 3–1 | 2–0 | 1–0 | 1–2 | 2–0 | 2–2 | 3–1 | 5–1 | 1–1 | 1–0 | 5–1 | | 2–1 | 1–0 | 1–0 | 0–0 |
| Tottenham Hotspur | 4–2 | 6–2 | 6–0 | 5–2 | 3–1 | 3–1 | 4–4 | 3–2 | 4–2 | 2–0 | 5–1 | 2–3 | 1–1 | 4–1 | 1–2 | 1–0 | 5–0 | 2–1 | | 1–2 | 2–0 | 1–1 |
| West Bromwich Albion | 2–3 | 0–2 | 1–2 | 1–2 | 3–1 | 3–2 | 0–2 | 1–1 | 3–0 | 3–0 | 2–4 | 1–0 | 6–3 | 1–1 | 6–0 | 1–2 | 3–1 | 2–2 | 1–3 | | 1–0 | 2–1 |
| West Ham United | 6–0 | 5–2 | 4–3 | 3–2 | 3–3 | 2–1 | 1–2 | 2–0 | 3–1 | 4–0 | 1–2 | 1–0 | 1–1 | 2–1 | 1–1 | 2–4 | 5–2 | 1–1 | 0–3 | 1–2 | | 5–0 |
| Wolverhampton Wanderers | 5–3 | 3–2 | 5–1 | 0–0 | 1–0 | 3–1 | 2–1 | 2–2 | 6–1 | 4–1 | 2–4 | 3–2 | 1–0 | 2–1 | 2–1 | 5–3 | 3–0 | 4–1 | 0–4 | 4–2 | 4–2 | |

Updated to match(es) played on unknown. Source: Ian Laschke: Rothmans Book of Football League Records 1888–89 to 1978–79. Macdonald and Jane’s, London & Sydney, 1980.
Legend: Blue = home team win; Yellow = draw; Red = away team win.

=== Maps ===
Locations of the Football League First Division London teams 1960–1961
Locations of the Football League First Division 1960–1961 teams

== Second Division ==
Second Division
- Season: 1960–61
- Champions: Ipswich Town
- Promoted: Ipswich Town; Sheffield United
- Relegated: Portsmouth; Lincoln City
- Cup Winners' Cup: Swansea Town
- Matches: 462
- Goals: 1,609 (3.48 per match)
- Top goalscorer: Ray Crawford (39 goals)

| Pos | Team | Pld | W | D | L | GF | GA | GAv | Pts | Qualification or relegation |
|---|---|---|---|---|---|---|---|---|---|---|
| 1 | Ipswich Town (C, P) | 42 | 26 | 7 | 9 | 100 | 55 | 1.818 | 59 | Promotion to the First Division |
| 2 | Sheffield United (P) | 42 | 26 | 6 | 10 | 81 | 51 | 1.588 | 58 | Promotion to the First Division |
| 3 | Liverpool | 42 | 21 | 10 | 11 | 87 | 58 | 1.500 | 52 | |
| 4 | Norwich City | 42 | 20 | 9 | 13 | 70 | 53 | 1.321 | 49 | |
| 5 | Middlesbrough | 42 | 18 | 12 | 12 | 83 | 74 | 1.122 | 48 | |
| 6 | Sunderland | 42 | 17 | 13 | 12 | 75 | 60 | 1.250 | 47 | |
| 7 | Swansea Town | 42 | 18 | 11 | 13 | 77 | 73 | 1.055 | 47 | Qualification for the European Cup Winners' Cup preliminary round |
| 8 | Southampton | 42 | 18 | 8 | 16 | 84 | 81 | 1.037 | 44 | |
| 9 | Scunthorpe United | 42 | 14 | 15 | 13 | 69 | 64 | 1.078 | 43 | |
| 10 | Charlton Athletic | 42 | 16 | 11 | 15 | 97 | 91 | 1.066 | 43 | |
| 11 | Plymouth Argyle | 42 | 17 | 8 | 17 | 81 | 82 | 0.988 | 42 | |
| 12 | Derby County | 42 | 15 | 10 | 17 | 80 | 80 | 1.000 | 40 | |
| 13 | Luton Town | 42 | 15 | 9 | 18 | 71 | 79 | 0.899 | 39 | |
| 14 | Leeds United | 42 | 14 | 10 | 18 | 75 | 83 | 0.904 | 38 | |
| 15 | Rotherham United | 42 | 12 | 13 | 17 | 65 | 64 | 1.016 | 37 | |
| 16 | Brighton & Hove Albion | 42 | 14 | 9 | 19 | 61 | 75 | 0.813 | 37 | |
| 17 | Bristol Rovers | 42 | 15 | 7 | 20 | 73 | 92 | 0.793 | 37 | |
| 18 | Stoke City | 42 | 12 | 12 | 18 | 51 | 59 | 0.864 | 36 | |
| 19 | Leyton Orient | 42 | 14 | 8 | 20 | 55 | 78 | 0.705 | 36 | |
| 20 | Huddersfield Town | 42 | 13 | 9 | 20 | 62 | 71 | 0.873 | 35 | |
| 21 | Portsmouth (R) | 42 | 11 | 11 | 20 | 64 | 91 | 0.703 | 33 | Relegation to the Third Division |
| 22 | Lincoln City (R) | 42 | 8 | 8 | 26 | 48 | 95 | 0.505 | 24 | Relegation to the Third Division |

Rules for classification: 1) Points; 2) Goal average; 3) Goals scored
(C) Champions; (P) Promoted; (R) Relegated

=== Results ===
| Home \ Away | B&HA | BRR | CHA | DER | HUD | IPS | LEE | LEY | LIN | LIV | LUT | MID | NWC | PLY | POR | ROT | SCU | SHU | SOU | STK | SUN | SWA |
|---|---|---|---|---|---|---|---|---|---|---|---|---|---|---|---|---|---|---|---|---|---|---|
| Brighton & Hove Albion | | 6–1 | 3–5 | 3–2 | 2–1 | 2–4 | 2–1 | 1–1 | 1–0 | 3–1 | 1–0 | 0–1 | 2–2 | 2–0 | 2–2 | 1–0 | 1–1 | 0–0 | 0–1 | 0–1 | 1–2 | 0–0 |
| Bristol Rovers | 0–1 | | 3–1 | 1–1 | 1–2 | 1–1 | 4–4 | 4–2 | 3–1 | 4–3 | 4–1 | 2–3 | 3–1 | 2–5 | 2–0 | 2–1 | 3–3 | 3–1 | 4–2 | 1–0 | 1–0 | 4–2 |
| Charlton Athletic | 3–1 | 2–1 | | 3–1 | 2–3 | 0–2 | 2–0 | 2–0 | 3–0 | 1–3 | 4–1 | 6–6 | 0–1 | 6–4 | 7–4 | 4–3 | 1–1 | 2–3 | 1–3 | 3–1 | 2–2 | 6–2 |
| Derby County | 4–1 | 1–1 | 2–3 | | 1–1 | 1–4 | 2–3 | 3–1 | 3–1 | 1–4 | 4–1 | 1–0 | 0–0 | 4–1 | 6–2 | 3–0 | 2–5 | 2–0 | 2–2 | 1–1 | 1–1 | 2–3 |
| Huddersfield Town | 0–1 | 4–0 | 2–2 | 1–3 | | 1–3 | 0–1 | 1–0 | 4–1 | 2–4 | 1–1 | 1–0 | 1–1 | 1–5 | 3–3 | 0–1 | 1–2 | 0–1 | 3–1 | 0–0 | 4–2 | 3–1 |
| Ipswich Town | 4–0 | 3–2 | 2–1 | 4–1 | 4–2 | | 4–0 | 6–2 | 3–1 | 1–0 | 0–1 | 3–1 | 4–1 | 3–1 | 2–2 | 1–1 | 2–0 | 0–1 | 3–3 | 2–1 | 4–0 | 0–3 |
| Leeds United | 3–2 | 1–1 | 1–0 | 3–3 | 1–4 | 2–5 | | 1–3 | 7–0 | 2–2 | 1–2 | 4–4 | 1–0 | 2–1 | 0–0 | 2–0 | 2–2 | 1–2 | 3–0 | 0–1 | 2–4 | 2–2 |
| Leyton Orient | 2–1 | 3–2 | 1–1 | 2–1 | 2–0 | 1–3 | 0–1 | | 1–2 | 1–3 | 2–1 | 1–1 | 1–0 | 1–1 | 2–1 | 2–1 | 2–1 | 1–4 | 1–1 | 3–1 | 0–1 | 2–2 |
| Lincoln City | 2–1 | 1–2 | 2–2 | 3–4 | 0–0 | 1–4 | 2–3 | 2–0 | | 1–2 | 1–1 | 5–2 | 1–4 | 3–1 | 2–3 | 0–1 | 0–2 | 0–5 | 0–3 | 1–1 | 1–2 | 2–0 |
| Liverpool | 2–0 | 3–0 | 2–1 | 1–0 | 3–1 | 1–1 | 2–0 | 5–0 | 2–0 | | 2–2 | 3–4 | 2–1 | 1–1 | 3–3 | 2–1 | 3–2 | 4–2 | 0–1 | 3–0 | 1–1 | 4–0 |
| Luton Town | 3–1 | 4–2 | 4–1 | 1–1 | 1–0 | 3–2 | 1–1 | 0–1 | 3–0 | 2–1 | | 6–1 | 0–2 | 3–2 | 1–0 | 2–1 | 0–0 | 1–4 | 4–1 | 4–1 | 3–3 | 2–2 |
| Middlesbrough | 2–2 | 1–1 | 2–2 | 1–2 | 2–1 | 3–1 | 3–0 | 2–0 | 1–1 | 1–1 | 2–1 | | 2–0 | 3–1 | 3–0 | 2–2 | 1–3 | 3–1 | 5–0 | 1–0 | 1–0 | 3–1 |
| Norwich City | 2–2 | 2–1 | 4–0 | 0–2 | 2–0 | 0–3 | 3–2 | 3–2 | 5–1 | 2–1 | 2–1 | 4–1 | | 1–0 | 3–1 | 3–1 | 0–1 | 1–1 | 5–0 | 1–0 | 3–0 | 0–0 |
| Plymouth Argyle | 1–2 | 5–0 | 6–4 | 4–2 | 2–1 | 1–2 | 3–1 | 3–2 | 1–1 | 0–4 | 1–1 | 3–3 | 3–0 | | 5–1 | 3–3 | 3–1 | 2–0 | 1–3 | 3–1 | 1–0 | 1–0 |
| Portsmouth | 4–0 | 3–0 | 1–1 | 3–2 | 1–3 | 1–0 | 3–1 | 1–2 | 3–0 | 2–2 | 3–2 | 0–3 | 3–0 | 0–2 | | 2–2 | 2–2 | 1–2 | 1–1 | 1–0 | 2–1 | 1–1 |
| Rotherham United | 5–2 | 4–0 | 2–3 | 1–1 | 2–2 | 1–1 | 1–3 | 2–1 | 2–0 | 1–0 | 5–2 | 1–2 | 0–2 | 0–0 | 1–0 | | 4–0 | 1–2 | 1–0 | 0–0 | 0–0 | 3–3 |
| Scunthorpe United | 2–2 | 2–1 | 0–0 | 1–2 | 0–1 | 4–0 | 3–2 | 2–2 | 3–1 | 2–3 | 1–0 | 1–1 | 2–1 | 2–0 | 5–1 | 1–1 | | 1–1 | 2–0 | 1–1 | 3–3 | 1–2 |
| Sheffield United | 2–1 | 2–3 | 1–0 | 3–1 | 3–1 | 1–3 | 3–2 | 4–1 | 2–1 | 1–1 | 2–1 | 4–1 | 1–1 | 3–0 | 3–1 | 3–1 | 2–0 | | 2–1 | 4–1 | 0–1 | 3–0 |
| Southampton | 4–2 | 4–2 | 1–2 | 5–1 | 4–2 | 1–1 | 2–4 | 1–1 | 2–3 | 4–1 | 3–2 | 3–2 | 2–2 | 1–1 | 5–1 | 3–2 | 4–2 | 0–1 | | 0–1 | 3–2 | 5–0 |
| Stoke City | 0–2 | 2–0 | 5–3 | 2–1 | 2–2 | 2–4 | 0–0 | 1–2 | 0–0 | 3–1 | 3–0 | 1–1 | 1–1 | 9–0 | 1–0 | 1–4 | 2–0 | 2–0 | 1–2 | | 0–0 | 1–3 |
| Sunderland | 2–1 | 2–0 | 2–2 | 1–2 | 1–2 | 2–0 | 2–3 | 4–1 | 2–2 | 1–1 | 7–1 | 2–0 | 0–3 | 2–1 | 4–1 | 1–1 | 2–0 | 1–1 | 3–1 | 4–0 | | 2–1 |
| Swansea Town | 2–3 | 2–1 | 3–3 | 2–1 | 2–0 | 2–1 | 3–2 | 1–0 | 1–2 | 2–0 | 3–1 | 3–2 | 4–1 | 1–2 | 4–0 | 2–1 | 2–2 | 3–0 | 4–1 | 0–0 | 3–3 | |

Updated to match(es) played on unknown. Source: Ian Laschke: Rothmans Book of Football League Records 1888–89 to 1978–79. Macdonald and Jane's, London & Sydney, 1980.
Legend: Blue = home team win; Yellow = draw; Red = away team win.
- The 6-6 draw between Charlton Athletic and Middlesbrough was only the second in Football League history - Leicester City and Arsenal drew 6-6 at Filbert Street on the 21st of April 1930.

=== Maps ===
Locations of the Football League Second Division London teams 1960–1961
Locations of the Football League Second Division 1960–1961 teams

== Third Division ==
Football League Third Division
- Season: 1960–61
- Champions: Bury (1st title)
- Promoted: Walsall
- Relegated: Bradford City, Chesterfield, Colchester United, Tranmere Rovers
- Matches: 552
- Goals: 1,842 (3.34 per match)
- Top goalscorer: Tony Richards (Walsall), 36

| Pos | Team | Pld | W | D | L | GF | GA | GAv | Pts | Promotion or relegation |
|---|---|---|---|---|---|---|---|---|---|---|
| 1 | Bury (C, P) | 46 | 30 | 8 | 8 | 108 | 45 | 2.400 | 68 | Promotion to the Second Division |
| 2 | Walsall (P) | 46 | 28 | 6 | 12 | 98 | 60 | 1.633 | 62 | Promotion to the Second Division |
| 3 | Queens Park Rangers | 46 | 25 | 10 | 11 | 93 | 60 | 1.550 | 60 | |
| 4 | Watford | 46 | 20 | 12 | 14 | 85 | 72 | 1.181 | 52 | |
| 5 | Notts County | 46 | 21 | 9 | 16 | 82 | 77 | 1.065 | 51 | |
| 6 | Grimsby Town | 46 | 20 | 10 | 16 | 77 | 69 | 1.116 | 50 | |
| 7 | Port Vale | 46 | 17 | 15 | 14 | 96 | 79 | 1.215 | 49 | |
| 8 | Barnsley | 46 | 21 | 7 | 18 | 83 | 80 | 1.038 | 49 | |
| 9 | Halifax Town | 46 | 16 | 17 | 13 | 71 | 78 | 0.910 | 49 | |
| 10 | Shrewsbury Town | 46 | 15 | 16 | 15 | 83 | 75 | 1.107 | 46 | |
| 11 | Hull City | 46 | 17 | 12 | 17 | 73 | 73 | 1.000 | 46 | |
| 12 | Torquay United | 46 | 14 | 17 | 15 | 75 | 83 | 0.904 | 45 | |
| 13 | Newport County | 46 | 17 | 11 | 18 | 81 | 90 | 0.900 | 45 | |
| 14 | Bristol City | 46 | 17 | 10 | 19 | 70 | 68 | 1.029 | 44 | |
| 15 | Coventry City | 46 | 16 | 12 | 18 | 80 | 83 | 0.964 | 44 | |
| 16 | Swindon Town | 46 | 14 | 15 | 17 | 62 | 55 | 1.127 | 43 | |
| 17 | Brentford | 46 | 13 | 17 | 16 | 56 | 70 | 0.800 | 43 | |
| 18 | Reading | 46 | 14 | 12 | 20 | 72 | 83 | 0.867 | 40 | |
| 19 | Bournemouth & Boscombe Athletic | 46 | 15 | 10 | 21 | 58 | 76 | 0.763 | 40 | |
| 20 | Southend United | 46 | 14 | 11 | 21 | 60 | 76 | 0.789 | 39 | |
| 21 | Tranmere Rovers (R) | 46 | 15 | 8 | 23 | 79 | 115 | 0.687 | 38 | Relegation to the Fourth Division |
| 22 | Bradford City (R) | 46 | 11 | 14 | 21 | 65 | 87 | 0.747 | 36 | Relegation to the Fourth Division |
| 23 | Colchester United (R) | 46 | 11 | 11 | 24 | 68 | 101 | 0.673 | 33 | Relegation to the Fourth Division |
| 24 | Chesterfield (R) | 46 | 10 | 12 | 24 | 67 | 87 | 0.770 | 32 | Relegation to the Fourth Division |

(C) Champions; (P) Promoted; (R) Relegated

=== Results ===
| Home \ Away | BAR | B&BA | BRA | BRE | BRI | BRY | CHF | COL | COV | GRI | HAL | HUL | NPC | NTC | PTV | QPR | REA | SHR | STD | SWI | TOR | TRA | WAL | WAT |
|---|---|---|---|---|---|---|---|---|---|---|---|---|---|---|---|---|---|---|---|---|---|---|---|---|
| Barnsley | | 2–3 | 5–2 | 1–1 | 2–0 | 3–1 | 3–1 | 3–0 | 4–1 | 3–2 | 1–1 | 1–0 | 1–3 | 5–2 | 5–1 | 3–3 | 1–1 | 4–2 | 2–1 | 2–1 | 1–0 | 2–1 | 2–2 | 0–1 |
| Bournemouth & Boscombe Athletic | 1–2 | | 2–2 | 0–1 | 2–2 | 0–3 | 1–0 | 4–4 | 2–1 | 2–1 | 1–2 | 2–2 | 2–2 | 1–3 | 1–1 | 1–0 | 2–0 | 2–2 | 3–2 | 2–1 | 1–3 | 2–1 | 0–3 | 0–1 |
| Bradford City | 1–4 | 3–1 | | 3–1 | 2–0 | 0–1 | 3–2 | 0–1 | 4–1 | 1–3 | 2–2 | 0–0 | 1–2 | 2–2 | 3–3 | 1–1 | 2–1 | 1–1 | 2–1 | 2–1 | 0–3 | 1–1 | 1–2 | 2–2 |
| Brentford | 0–0 | 2–2 | 2–2 | | 2–0 | 1–5 | 2–2 | 0–0 | 1–1 | 0–1 | 2–0 | 2–2 | 2–4 | 3–0 | 0–0 | 2–0 | 2–1 | 4–0 | 1–1 | 2–1 | 2–3 | 4–1 | 3–1 | 2–1 |
| Bristol City | 4–0 | 1–0 | 1–2 | 3–0 | | 1–2 | 3–0 | 5–0 | 2–0 | 2–1 | 3–2 | 1–2 | 3–0 | 2–1 | 3–4 | 1–1 | 2–0 | 0–0 | 2–0 | 1–1 | 2–2 | 2–0 | 2–0 | 4–1 |
| Bury | 2–1 | 1–1 | 2–2 | 1–0 | 1–0 | | 3–3 | 4–0 | 1–0 | 2–0 | 4–1 | 3–0 | 4–1 | 7–0 | 3–1 | 1–0 | 3–0 | 3–1 | 2–0 | 3–0 | 6–0 | 3–0 | 3–4 | 0–2 |
| Chesterfield | 5–1 | 0–1 | 4–1 | 1–1 | 3–0 | 2–2 | | 2–3 | 4–1 | 2–3 | 3–0 | 1–2 | 1–0 | 3–1 | 0–0 | 0–1 | 2–2 | 2–3 | 0–3 | 1–1 | 2–0 | 1–1 | 1–2 | 2–0 |
| Colchester United | 4–2 | 0–1 | 2–4 | 2–4 | 0–1 | 0–2 | 4–3 | | 4–3 | 1–1 | 3–1 | 4–0 | 1–1 | 1–2 | 2–0 | 0–1 | 2–2 | 1–1 | 2–0 | 3–1 | 3–3 | 0–3 | 0–4 | 1–4 |
| Coventry City | 5–2 | 1–0 | 2–2 | 2–0 | 2–1 | 1–2 | 3–1 | 2–0 | | 0–0 | 2–0 | 4–0 | 4–1 | 2–2 | 1–1 | 4–4 | 2–1 | 3–2 | 3–0 | 1–1 | 5–1 | 4–1 | 1–2 | 0–1 |
| Grimsby Town | 3–2 | 0–1 | 1–0 | 0–0 | 5–2 | 2–2 | 0–0 | 2–1 | 2–3 | | 6–1 | 2–0 | 2–1 | 1–1 | 0–5 | 3–1 | 3–1 | 0–2 | 1–0 | 3–2 | 4–2 | 4–1 | 3–1 | 1–3 |
| Halifax Town | 1–0 | 2–1 | 3–2 | 1–0 | 2–1 | 0–2 | 2–1 | 2–1 | 2–2 | 0–0 | | 3–0 | 2–1 | 0–1 | 3–3 | 1–1 | 1–0 | 1–1 | 6–2 | 1–1 | 3–2 | 5–0 | 1–0 | 0–0 |
| Hull City | 2–0 | 2–0 | 3–0 | 3–0 | 3–3 | 0–1 | 2–2 | 1–1 | 1–1 | 2–3 | 4–2 | | 5–1 | 3–1 | 2–2 | 3–1 | 1–0 | 3–1 | 0–1 | 0–0 | 2–3 | 4–2 | 2–1 | 3–2 |
| Newport County | 2–3 | 2–0 | 1–0 | 0–1 | 4–1 | 0–0 | 5–1 | 3–2 | 3–3 | 1–1 | 1–1 | 3–1 | | 2–2 | 2–1 | 1–3 | 5–2 | 1–1 | 1–2 | 2–0 | 2–2 | 1–0 | 4–2 | 5–1 |
| Notts County | 5–1 | 3–2 | 2–1 | 0–0 | 3–0 | 0–3 | 1–0 | 4–2 | 3–0 | 0–1 | 1–1 | 2–1 | 6–0 | | 2–2 | 2–1 | 4–2 | 2–1 | 1–2 | 1–0 | 0–1 | 4–1 | 3–1 | 3–1 |
| Port Vale | 2–0 | 3–0 | 2–4 | 3–2 | 1–1 | 4–3 | 7–1 | 3–0 | 3–1 | 3–2 | 2–3 | 4–1 | 3–1 | 1–3 | | 0–1 | 1–1 | 4–1 | 4–0 | 4–1 | 0–3 | 5–0 | 1–1 | 3–0 |
| Queens Park Rangers | 4–2 | 3–1 | 1–0 | 0–0 | 1–1 | 3–1 | 1–2 | 3–2 | 2–1 | 2–0 | 5–1 | 2–1 | 2–0 | 2–0 | 1–0 | | 5–2 | 1–1 | 2–1 | 3–1 | 3–3 | 9–2 | 1–0 | 2–1 |
| Reading | 0–1 | 4–3 | 3–1 | 4–0 | 1–1 | 1–3 | 2–0 | 2–1 | 0–0 | 3–1 | 1–1 | 2–4 | 2–3 | 2–0 | 2–1 | 3–1 | | 2–1 | 3–0 | 1–1 | 5–1 | 1–2 | 3–2 | 1–1 |
| Shrewsbury Town | 1–2 | 2–1 | 2–0 | 3–0 | 4–2 | 2–1 | 4–2 | 2–2 | 2–1 | 2–1 | 1–1 | 0–0 | 5–0 | 4–0 | 1–1 | 4–1 | 6–1 | | 2–2 | 1–1 | 2–1 | 1–2 | 1–2 | 2–2 |
| Southend | 2–0 | 0–0 | 0–0 | 1–1 | 1–0 | 0–3 | 1–1 | 2–1 | 4–1 | 1–1 | 2–2 | 3–1 | 4–2 | 3–1 | 2–1 | 0–0 | 0–1 | 1–1 | | 0–2 | 3–2 | 1–2 | 1–2 | 6–1 |
| Swindon Town | 1–0 | 0–1 | 4–0 | 1–1 | 3–1 | 4–0 | 2–0 | 0–2 | 1–2 | 3–0 | 1–1 | 1–1 | 2–0 | 1–0 | 6–0 | 1–0 | 1–1 | 2–2 | 1–1 | | 3–1 | 1–0 | 1–0 | 1–2 |
| Torquay United | 1–1 | 0–1 | 2–1 | 1–1 | 0–0 | 1–1 | 3–0 | 1–1 | 3–0 | 0–0 | 1–1 | 1–2 | 0–0 | 2–2 | 1–1 | 1–6 | 4–2 | 2–0 | 2–1 | 1–1 | | 5–2 | 3–0 | 2–2 |
| Tranmere | 2–1 | 4–3 | 1–0 | 2–0 | 3–2 | 1–7 | 1–1 | 7–2 | 2–0 | 3–6 | 6–2 | 1–0 | 2–4 | 2–3 | 3–3 | 1–2 | 1–1 | 4–2 | 2–1 | 2–2 | 2–2 | | 1–4 | 0–2 |
| Walsall | 1–0 | 2–0 | 4–0 | 4–0 | 4–0 | 1–0 | 2–1 | 3–0 | 1–1 | 2–1 | 0–0 | 1–0 | 2–2 | 2–1 | 6–2 | 4–3 | 2–2 | 3–2 | 5–1 | 2–1 | 3–0 | 3–1 | | 5–2 |
| Watford | 1–2 | 0–1 | 2–2 | 6–1 | 0–1 | 1–1 | 3–1 | 2–2 | 7–2 | 2–0 | 4–3 | 2–2 | 4–1 | 2–2 | 0–0 | 0–3 | 2–0 | 3–1 | 3–0 | 1–0 | 3–0 | 2–2 | 2–0 | |

Updated to match(es) played on unknown. Source: Ian Laschke: Rothmans Book of Football League Records 1888–89 to 1978–79. Macdonald and Jane's, London & Sydney, 1980.
Legend: Blue = home team win; Yellow = draw; Red = away team win.

=== Maps ===
Locations of the Football League Third Division London teams 1960–1961
Locations of the Football League Third Division teams 1960–1961

== Fourth Division ==
Football League Fourth Division
- Season: 1960–61
- Champions: Peterborough United (1st title)
- Promoted: Bradford Park Avenue, Crystal Palace, Northampton Town
- Failed re-election: none
- New Club in League: Peterborough United
- Matches: 552
- Goals: 1,810 (3.28 per match)
- Top goalscorer: Terry Bly (Peterborough United), 52

| Pos | Team | Pld | W | D | L | GF | GA | GAv | Pts | Promotion or relegation |
|---|---|---|---|---|---|---|---|---|---|---|
| 1 | Peterborough United (C, P) | 46 | 28 | 10 | 8 | 134 | 65 | 2.062 | 66 | Promotion to the Third Division |
| 2 | Crystal Palace (P) | 46 | 29 | 6 | 11 | 110 | 69 | 1.594 | 64 | Promotion to the Third Division |
| 3 | Northampton Town (P) | 46 | 25 | 10 | 11 | 90 | 62 | 1.452 | 60 | Promotion to the Third Division |
| 4 | Bradford (Park Avenue) (P) | 46 | 26 | 8 | 12 | 84 | 74 | 1.135 | 60 | Promotion to the Third Division |
| 5 | York City | 46 | 21 | 9 | 16 | 80 | 60 | 1.333 | 51 | |
| 6 | Millwall | 46 | 21 | 8 | 17 | 97 | 86 | 1.128 | 50 | |
| 7 | Darlington | 46 | 18 | 13 | 15 | 78 | 70 | 1.114 | 49 | |
| 8 | Workington | 46 | 21 | 7 | 18 | 74 | 76 | 0.974 | 49 | |
| 9 | Crewe Alexandra | 46 | 20 | 9 | 17 | 61 | 67 | 0.910 | 49 | |
| 10 | Aldershot | 46 | 18 | 9 | 19 | 79 | 69 | 1.145 | 45 | |
| 11 | Doncaster Rovers | 46 | 19 | 7 | 20 | 76 | 78 | 0.974 | 45 | |
| 12 | Oldham Athletic | 46 | 19 | 7 | 20 | 79 | 88 | 0.898 | 45 | |
| 13 | Stockport County | 46 | 18 | 9 | 19 | 57 | 66 | 0.864 | 45 | |
| 14 | Southport | 46 | 19 | 6 | 21 | 69 | 67 | 1.030 | 44 | |
| 15 | Gillingham | 46 | 15 | 13 | 18 | 64 | 66 | 0.970 | 43 | |
| 16 | Wrexham | 46 | 17 | 8 | 21 | 62 | 56 | 1.107 | 42 | |
| 17 | Rochdale | 46 | 17 | 8 | 21 | 60 | 66 | 0.909 | 42 | |
| 18 | Accrington Stanley | 46 | 16 | 8 | 22 | 74 | 88 | 0.841 | 40 | |
| 19 | Carlisle United | 46 | 13 | 13 | 20 | 61 | 79 | 0.772 | 39 | |
| 20 | Mansfield Town | 46 | 16 | 6 | 24 | 71 | 78 | 0.910 | 38 | |
| 21 | Exeter City | 46 | 14 | 10 | 22 | 66 | 94 | 0.702 | 38 | Re-elected |
| 22 | Barrow | 46 | 13 | 11 | 22 | 52 | 79 | 0.658 | 37 | Re-elected |
| 23 | Hartlepools United | 46 | 12 | 8 | 26 | 71 | 103 | 0.689 | 32 | Re-elected |
| 24 | Chester | 46 | 11 | 9 | 26 | 61 | 104 | 0.587 | 31 | Re-elected |

Source: rsssf.com
(C) Champions; (P) Promoted

=== Results ===
| Home \ Away | ACC | ALD | BRW | BPA | CRL | CHE | CRE | CRY | DAR | DON | EXE | GIL | HAR | MAN | MIL | NOR | OLD | PET | ROC | SOU | STP | WRK | WRE | YOR |
|---|---|---|---|---|---|---|---|---|---|---|---|---|---|---|---|---|---|---|---|---|---|---|---|---|
| Accrington Stanley | | 1–0 | 0–0 | 1–2 | 1–0 | 2–0 | 1–3 | 2–3 | 2–2 | 2–2 | 0–1 | 3–0 | 3–0 | 1–4 | 3–3 | 3–2 | 5–1 | 3–2 | 2–0 | 2–1 | 4–1 | 1–2 | 0–3 | 2–0 |
| Aldershot | 3–1 | | 2–1 | 3–0 | 2–1 | 3–2 | 5–0 | 2–1 | 1–3 | 5–0 | 3–1 | 0–1 | 4–0 | 2–0 | 0–2 | 2–2 | 4–0 | 1–1 | 3–0 | 1–0 | 3–2 | 0–0 | 0–0 | 6–1 |
| Barrow | 1–1 | 2–0 | | 5–0 | 0–2 | 3–0 | 3–4 | 0–3 | 1–1 | 2–1 | 1–1 | 0–1 | 2–1 | 1–1 | 2–1 | 1–0 | 1–2 | 2–1 | 1–0 | 0–1 | 3–1 | 0–4 | 1–1 | 1–1 |
| Bradford (Park Avenue) | 2–2 | 1–0 | 4–0 | | 0–0 | 1–0 | 2–0 | 3–1 | 1–0 | 1–1 | 5–2 | 0–0 | 1–3 | 2–1 | 2–1 | 1–3 | 5–1 | 1–0 | 2–1 | 1–0 | 4–2 | 4–0 | 3–1 | 3–3 |
| Carlisle United | 3–1 | 2–2 | 1–0 | 2–2 | | 3–1 | 0–1 | 2–0 | 4–4 | 2–1 | 2–2 | 1–3 | 2–2 | 3–1 | 1–2 | 2–1 | 3–0 | 3–3 | 1–2 | 1–0 | 1–4 | 2–4 | 1–0 | 1–1 |
| Chester | 2–3 | 2–0 | 0–0 | 3–1 | 3–2 | | 0–0 | 3–0 | 0–3 | 1–2 | 4–4 | 2–2 | 1–2 | 3–3 | 1–4 | 0–2 | 3–1 | 1–2 | 3–1 | 1–0 | 0–0 | 2–2 | 1–0 | 2–1 |
| Crewe Alexandra | 0–1 | 2–1 | 0–1 | 1–1 | 3–0 | 5–2 | | 1–2 | 1–1 | 1–1 | 2–0 | 2–1 | 3–0 | 1–2 | 2–2 | 0–2 | 2–1 | 3–1 | 3–0 | 0–1 | 4–1 | 1–2 | 2–1 | 1–5 |
| Crystal Palace | 9–2 | 2–1 | 4–2 | 4–1 | 1–1 | 5–1 | 0–0 | | 3–2 | 5–1 | 0–0 | 2–0 | 2–2 | 4–1 | 0–2 | 2–3 | 2–1 | 0–2 | 4–1 | 5–0 | 2–1 | 4–2 | 3–2 | 1–0 |
| Darlington | 3–2 | 2–2 | 2–3 | 0–0 | 0–0 | 5–1 | 0–1 | 0–1 | | 1–0 | 3–0 | 2–2 | 4–0 | 3–2 | 5–2 | 1–1 | 0–1 | 2–2 | 1–0 | 1–0 | 2–0 | 1–1 | 1–2 | 2–1 |
| Doncaster Rovers | 1–0 | 3–1 | 3–0 | 2–0 | 1–0 | 2–1 | 6–0 | 1–5 | 4–0 | | 2–1 | 2–3 | 5–3 | 2–3 | 3–0 | 0–2 | 2–1 | 1–2 | 3–2 | 0–1 | 3–1 | 3–4 | 3–1 | 0–2 |
| Exeter City | 2–4 | 1–0 | 2–2 | 4–2 | 0–0 | 4–1 | 0–1 | 2–3 | 1–3 | 2–0 | | 2–0 | 2–1 | 0–2 | 2–3 | 1–3 | 3–0 | 3–4 | 1–0 | 2–1 | 2–1 | 0–0 | 1–0 | 2–1 |
| Gillingham | 2–1 | 5–2 | 2–2 | 3–4 | 1–1 | 3–0 | 0–0 | 1–2 | 0–1 | 2–0 | 4–2 | | 5–1 | 0–0 | 1–2 | 0–1 | 2–3 | 4–4 | 0–0 | 2–0 | 1–1 | 4–2 | 0–3 | 3–2 |
| Hartlepool | 4–1 | 3–1 | 0–2 | 2–4 | 0–1 | 4–4 | 1–2 | 2–4 | 5–0 | 2–1 | 0–0 | 1–0 | | 3–2 | 2–2 | 4–2 | 5–1 | 0–2 | 2–0 | 1–5 | 0–2 | 4–1 | 0–0 | 1–3 |
| Mansfield Town | 0–0 | 2–0 | 5–1 | 1–2 | 1–3 | 3–1 | 1–1 | 1–2 | 2–1 | 1–2 | 2–3 | 1–0 | 2–1 | | 5–1 | 4–2 | 1–2 | 1–0 | 0–2 | 1–2 | 2–2 | 2–0 | 0–3 | 1–3 |
| Millwall | 2–2 | 2–2 | 3–0 | 5–1 | 4–2 | 5–1 | 2–3 | 0–2 | 0–1 | 0–1 | 2–2 | 1–2 | 5–2 | 3–0 | | 3–1 | 0–1 | 4–3 | 4–1 | 3–1 | 3–0 | 0–3 | 2–0 | 3–2 |
| Northampton Town | 2–1 | 2–1 | 3–0 | 0–1 | 0–0 | 3–2 | 4–1 | 1–2 | 1–1 | 3–0 | 3–1 | 3–1 | 3–3 | 1–0 | 2–2 | | 1–0 | 0–3 | 5–1 | 3–1 | 4–2 | 3–2 | 3–0 | 3–0 |
| Oldham Athletic | 5–2 | 0–2 | 3–1 | 4–0 | 5–2 | 4–1 | 1–0 | 4–3 | 3–3 | 1–1 | 5–2 | 1–1 | 2–1 | 3–1 | 2–3 | 1–2 | | 1–1 | 0–2 | 3–2 | 3–0 | 3–5 | 0–2 | 3–1 |
| Peterborough United | 3–0 | 7–1 | 6–2 | 3–1 | 5–0 | 6–0 | 4–1 | 4–1 | 5–1 | 6–2 | 7–1 | 2–0 | 3–2 | 2–1 | 4–2 | 3–3 | 2–2 | | 4–3 | 3–4 | 0–1 | 2–1 | 3–0 | 1–1 |
| Rochdale | 3–2 | 1–1 | 0–0 | 2–3 | 2–1 | 2–0 | 3–0 | 2–2 | 1–0 | 2–1 | 3–1 | 2–0 | 4–0 | 1–2 | 4–0 | 1–1 | 3–0 | 2–2 | | 0–1 | 1–1 | 2–0 | 2–1 | 0–0 |
| Southport | 3–0 | 1–1 | 4–1 | 2–3 | 3–0 | 1–2 | 2–0 | 3–3 | 1–4 | 1–1 | 2–0 | 1–2 | 2–0 | 2–1 | 4–1 | 2–0 | 2–0 | 3–3 | 0–1 | | 1–0 | 3–0 | 2–2 | 2–2 |
| Stockport County | 0–3 | 2–0 | 1–0 | 2–3 | 2–0 | 1–1 | 0–1 | 5–2 | 2–1 | 1–0 | 0–0 | 2–0 | 1–1 | 1–0 | 3–1 | 1–1 | 0–1 | 0–6 | 1–0 | 2–0 | | 1–0 | 1–0 | 2–0 |
| Workington | 2–1 | 0–4 | 3–1 | 1–3 | 2–1 | 1–0 | 0–0 | 1–0 | 1–3 | 1–3 | 3–1 | 2–0 | 2–0 | 1–3 | 2–2 | 3–0 | 1–1 | 0–3 | 3–0 | 3–1 | 1–0 | | 3–1 | 2–0 |
| Wrexham | 3–0 | 3–1 | 1–0 | 0–1 | 2–1 | 1–2 | 0–1 | 1–2 | 3–1 | 2–2 | 3–1 | 0–0 | 1–0 | 2–0 | 0–1 | 2–2 | 2–2 | 0–1 | 2–0 | 3–0 | 1–3 | 2–1 | | 4–0 |
| York City | 1–0 | 4–1 | 2–0 | 2–0 | 4–0 | 2–0 | 3–1 | 0–2 | 4–1 | 1–1 | 6–1 | 0–0 | 4–0 | 3–2 | 3–2 | 0–1 | 1–0 | 0–1 | 2–0 | 2–0 | 0–0 | 4–0 | 2–1 | |

Updated to match(es) played on unknown. Source: Ian Laschke: Rothmans Book of Football League Records 1888–89 to 1978–79. Macdonald and Jane's, London & Sydney, 1980.
Legend: Blue = home team win; Yellow = draw; Red = away team win.

=== Maps ===
Locations of the Football League Fourth Division London teams 1960–1961
Locations of the Football League Fourth Division teams 1960–1961

== Television ==
This season saw the first ever live television coverage of a Football League game, when ITV broadcast the second half of Blackpool versus Bolton Wanderers on September 10, 1960, with commentary from Peter Lloyd and Billy Wright

== Attendances ==
=== Division One ===
| No. | Club | Average | ± | Highest | Lowest |
|---|---|---|---|---|---|
| 1 | Tottenham Hotspur FC | 53,124 | 10.8% | 65,251 | 35,743 |
| 2 | Everton FC | 43,448 | 6.5% | 74,867 | 27,579 |
| 3 | Manchester United | 37,888 | -19.9% | 65,535 | 23,188 |
| 4 | Arsenal FC | 34,318 | -12.8% | 59,868 | 20,010 |
| 5 | Aston Villa FC | 33,599 | -1.9% | 50,786 | 15,732 |
| 6 | Wolverhampton Wanderers FC | 30,885 | -14.8% | 52,829 | 23,192 |
| 7 | Chelsea FC | 30,156 | -23.5% | 57,103 | 19,568 |
| 8 | Manchester City FC | 29,409 | -17.5% | 50,479 | 18,252 |
| 9 | Sheffield Wednesday FC | 29,229 | -8.8% | 53,988 | 20,462 |
| 10 | Newcastle United FC | 26,500 | -26.5% | 51,369 | 16,107 |
| 11 | Birmingham City FC | 25,775 | -4.8% | 41,656 | 15,015 |
| 12 | West Bromwich Albion FC | 24,710 | -10.0% | 41,903 | 15,099 |
| 13 | Nottingham Forest FC | 24,668 | -7.7% | 37,248 | 15,118 |
| 14 | Leicester City FC | 24,056 | -5.3% | 32,042 | 16,920 |
| 15 | Burnley FC | 23,827 | -11.7% | 44,232 | 11,609 |
| 16 | Cardiff City FC | 23,390 | -3.3% | 45,463 | 9,549 |
| 17 | Fulham FC | 23,014 | -24.0% | 38,536 | 13,139 |
| 18 | West Ham United FC | 21,948 | -23.1% | 34,351 | 13,967 |
| 19 | Bolton Wanderers FC | 21,670 | -16.6% | 41,565 | 11,534 |
| 20 | Blackburn Rovers FC | 19,344 | -29.1% | 29,236 | 12,746 |
| 21 | Blackpool FC | 18,715 | -14.1% | 30,835 | 8,752 |
| 22 | Preston North End FC | 16,804 | -31.6% | 25,604 | 7,667 |

=== Division Two ===
| No. | Club | Average | ± | Highest | Lowest |
|---|---|---|---|---|---|
| 1 | Liverpool FC | 29,608 | -2.2% | 43,041 | 13,389 |
| 2 | Sunderland AFC | 26,051 | 14.1% | 53,254 | 14,635 |
| 3 | Norwich City FC | 24,461 | -7.4% | 32,619 | 18,756 |
| 4 | Southampton FC | 18,665 | 3.4% | 28,845 | 7,016 |
| 5 | Sheffield United FC | 18,487 | 2.5% | 35,057 | 12,602 |
| 6 | Plymouth Argyle FC | 17,613 | -13.6% | 24,873 | 9,879 |
| 7 | Middlesbrough FC | 15,859 | -37.9% | 27,458 | 8,736 |
| 8 | Brighton & Hove Albion FC | 15,522 | -15.3% | 20,646 | 9,017 |
| 9 | Ipswich Town FC | 15,095 | 9.6% | 23,321 | 9,803 |
| 10 | Portsmouth FC | 15,028 | -7.0% | 31,059 | 7,272 |
| 11 | Bristol Rovers FC | 14,888 | -19.5% | 20,093 | 10,145 |
| 12 | Derby County FC | 14,094 | -10.9% | 21,608 | 8,841 |
| 13 | Leeds United FC | 13,443 | -38.6% | 22,146 | 6,975 |
| 14 | Huddersfield Town AFC | 13,434 | -9.1% | 18,938 | 5,860 |
| 15 | Luton Town FC | 12,574 | -26.3% | 22,252 | 7,149 |
| 16 | Swansea City AFC | 12,084 | -15.8% | 18,239 | 7,680 |
| 17 | Charlton Athletic FC | 11,102 | -29.2% | 15,622 | 6,608 |
| 18 | Leyton Orient FC | 10,539 | -20.5% | 14,798 | 5,793 |
| 19 | Rotherham United FC | 9,549 | -25.8% | 19,549 | 6,284 |
| 20 | Stoke City FC | 9,252 | -36.2% | 14,691 | 4,463 |
| 21 | Scunthorpe United FC | 9,187 | -17.3% | 13,852 | 5,762 |
| 22 | Lincoln City FC | 7,429 | -30.8% | 10,859 | 3,996 |

=== Division Three ===
| No. | Club | Average | ± | Highest | Lowest |
|---|---|---|---|---|---|
| 1 | Watford FC | 12,599 | 4.9% | 17,883 | 7,089 |
| 2 | Coventry City FC | 11,996 | -26.6% | 18,793 | 7,422 |
| 3 | Notts County FC | 11,974 | -13.4% | 26,759 | 3,933 |
| 4 | Bristol City FC | 11,488 | -35.3% | 16,550 | 7,796 |
| 5 | Swindon Town FC | 11,044 | 8.0% | 16,618 | 8,666 |
| 6 | Walsall FC | 10,657 | -4.5% | 16,446 | 6,238 |
| 7 | Bury FC | 10,207 | -4.0% | 14,701 | 5,861 |
| 8 | Queens Park Rangers FC | 9,958 | -3.2% | 15,391 | 4,921 |
| 9 | Port Vale FC | 9,702 | -9.6% | 15,504 | 4,068 |
| 10 | Tranmere Rovers | 9,460 | -5.1% | 15,357 | 5,584 |
| 11 | Grimsby Town FC | 9,295 | -11.8% | 14,779 | 3,852 |
| 12 | Hull City AFC | 8,434 | -45.6% | 14,252 | 3,950 |
| 13 | Southend United FC | 8,100 | -21.5% | 11,540 | 5,296 |
| 14 | Shrewsbury Town FC | 8,025 | -10.8% | 18,917 | 5,574 |
| 15 | AFC Bournemouth | 7,808 | -24.9% | 12,222 | 4,353 |
| 16 | Reading FC | 7,692 | -32.9% | 15,058 | 4,945 |
| 17 | Bradford City AFC | 7,447 | -26.7% | 11,450 | 4,187 |
| 18 | Brentford FC | 7,392 | -37.9% | 16,673 | 3,503 |
| 19 | Barnsley FC | 6,489 | 2.7% | 15,461 | 3,210 |
| 20 | Torquay United FC | 6,153 | -9.7% | 9,175 | 4,144 |
| 21 | Halifax Town AFC | 5,548 | -18.0% | 9,678 | 3,203 |
| 22 | Newport County AFC | 5,439 | -12.9% | 9,233 | 2,785 |
| 23 | Chesterfield FC | 5,180 | -21.3% | 12,079 | 3,099 |
| 24 | Colchester United FC | 4,962 | -36.5% | 7,194 | 3,141 |

=== Division Four ===
| No. | Club | Average | ± | Highest | Lowest |
|---|---|---|---|---|---|
| 1 | Crystal Palace FC | 19,089 | 22.1% | 37,774 | 11,161 |
| 2 | Peterborough United FC | 14,203 | - | 22,959 | 10,477 |
| 3 | Oldham Athletic FC | 12,644 | 155.1% | 27,888 | 6,412 |
| 4 | Northampton Town FC | 10,682 | 28.6% | 21,000 | 6,835 |
| 5 | Millwall FC | 9,703 | -33.4% | 18,252 | 6,335 |
| 6 | Bradford Park Avenue AFC | 9,209 | 43.9% | 20,461 | 4,395 |
| 7 | Crewe Alexandra FC | 7,355 | -7.6% | 11,016 | 4,297 |
| 8 | York City FC | 6,900 | -8.1% | 11,768 | 4,271 |
| 9 | Stockport County FC | 6,506 | -0.7% | 11,374 | 3,549 |
| 10 | Wrexham AFC | 6,378 | -32.8% | 10,609 | 3,303 |
| 11 | Aldershot Town FC | 6,298 | 15.5% | 12,387 | 3,826 |
| 12 | Gillingham FC | 6,005 | -3.6% | 12,048 | 3,154 |
| 13 | Darlington FC | 5,894 | 26.7% | 9,325 | 2,417 |
| 14 | Exeter City FC | 5,178 | -30.2% | 10,412 | 3,042 |
| 15 | Mansfield Town FC | 4,936 | -31.3% | 11,384 | 2,338 |
| 16 | Chester City FC | 4,893 | -9.7% | 9,750 | 2,466 |
| 17 | Doncaster Rovers FC | 4,755 | -9.4% | 9,664 | 2,584 |
| 18 | Southport FC | 4,648 | 30.5% | 7,398 | 2,770 |
| 19 | Carlisle United FC | 4,446 | -16.0% | 9,261 | 2,422 |
| 20 | Barrow AFC | 4,299 | -23.4% | 7,009 | 1,730 |
| 21 | Hartlepool United FC | 4,091 | 12.2% | 10,784 | 2,332 |
| 22 | Rochdale AFC | 3,929 | -14.6% | 7,353 | 2,173 |
| 23 | Accrington Stanley FC | 3,530 | -14.5% | 5,736 | 1,758 |
| 24 | Workington AFC | 3,210 | -25.5% | 6,538 | 1,750 |

== See also ==
- 1960-61 in English football
- 1960 in association football
- 1961 in association football
