= 1960 in association football =

The following are the football (soccer) events of the year 1960 throughout the world.

== Clubs founded ==
- NK Maribor

== Events ==
- Copa Libertadores 1960
  - Won by Peñarol after defeating Olimpia Asunción on an aggregate score of 2–1.
- European Cup 1959-60
  - Real Madrid beat Eintracht Frankfurt, 7–3, in the final at Hampden Park
- Inter-Cities Fairs Cup 1958-60
  - FC Barcelona defeated Birmingham City in the final, 4–1, on aggregate
- 1960 International Soccer League
  - Bangu beat Kilmarnock F.C., 2–0, in the final at the Polo Grounds
- April 3 – Humphrey Mijnals becomes the first player from Surinamese descent who makes his debut for the Netherlands national football team when Holland defeats Bulgaria (4–2) in a friendly.

== Winners club national championship ==
- Argentina: Club Atlético Independiente
- Brazil: Palmeiras
- Egypt: Zamalek
- England: Burnley
- France: Stade de Reims
- Hungary: Újpest FC
- Israel: Hapoel Petah Tikva F.C.
- Italy: Juventus
- Mexico: Chivas Guadalajara
- Netherlands: Ajax Amsterdam
- Paraguay: Olimpia Asunción
- Scotland: Hearts
- Soviet Union: Torpedo Moscow
- Spain: Barcelona
- Sweden: IFK Norrköping
- Turkey: Beşiktaş

== International tournaments ==
- UEFA European Football Championship in France (July 6 – 10 1960)
  1. Soviet Union
  2. Yugoslavia
  3. Czechoslovakia
- Olympic Games in Rome, Italy (August 26 – September 10, 1960)
  1. Yugoslavia
  2. Denmark
  3. Hungary
- 1960 British Home Championship (October 3, 1959 – April 15, 1960)

Shared by England, Scotland and Wales

== Births ==
- January 3 – Washington César Santos, Brazilian international footballer (died 2014)
- January 27 – Ryszard Rybak, Polish footballer
- February 10 – Miguel Bossio, Uruguayan international footballer
- February 27 – Jan van Grinsven, Dutch footballer
- March 27 – Hans Pflügler, German international footballer
- April 4 – Marvin Obando, Costa Rican footballer
- April 11 – Marko Elsner, Slovenian international footballer (died 2020)
- April 14 – Gian Piero Ventrone, Italian coach and athletic trainer (died 2022)
- April 16 – Pierre Littbarski, German international footballer and manager
- April 18 – Zvjezdan Cvetković, Yugoslavian international footballer and Croatian Serb manager (died 2017)
- April 29 – Ron de Groot, Dutch footballer and manager
- May 8 – Franco Baresi, Italian footballer (died 2026)
- May 24 – Packie Bonner, Irish footballer
- June 16 – Cándido Martínez, Spanish footballer
- June 25 – Craig Johnston, Australian footballer
- July 20 – Lauren Gregg, American soccer coach
- August 9 – Viorel Turcu, Romanian international footballer (died 2020)
- August 24 – Jimmy Montanero, Ecuadorian international footballer
- August 28 – Julio César Romero, Paraguayan footballer
- October 30 – Diego Maradona, Argentine international footballer (died 2020)
- November 26 – Rémy Vogel, French international footballer (died 2016)
- November 27 – Martin van Geel, Dutch footballer
- November 30 – Gary Lineker, English international footballer and TV presenter
- December 20 – Piet Keur, Dutch footballer
- December 31 – Steve Bruce, English international

== Deaths ==
=== June ===
- June 25 - Charlie Buchan (68), English international footballer (born 1891)

=== September ===
- September 15 - Héctor Castro, Uruguayan striker, winner of the 1930 FIFA World Cup. (55, Heart attack)
