= 1961–62 Football League =

63rd season of the Football League

The Football League
- Season: 1961–62
- Champions: Ipswich Town F.C
- Resigned: Accrington Stanley

The 1961–62 season was the 63rd completed season of The Football League.

== Final league tables ==
The tables below are reproduced here in the exact form that they can be found at The Rec.Sport.Soccer Statistics Foundation website and in Rothmans Book of Football League Records 1888–89 to 1978–79, with home and away statistics separated.

Beginning with the season 1894–95, clubs finishing level on points were separated according to goal average (goals scored divided by goals conceded), or more properly put, goal ratio. In case one or more teams had the same goal difference, this system favoured those teams who had scored fewer goals. The goal average system was eventually scrapped beginning with the 1976–77 season.

Since the Fourth Division was established in the 1958–59 season, the bottom four teams of that division have been required to apply for re-election.

Match results are drawn from Rothmans for all divisions.

== First Division ==
First Division
- Season: 1961–62
- Champions: Ipswich Town; 1st English title
- Relegated: Cardiff City; Chelsea
- European Cup: Ipswich Town
- European Cup Winners' Cup: Tottenham Hotspur
- Inter-Cities Fairs Cup: Everton
- Matches: 462
- Goals: 1,582 (3.42 per match)
- Top goalscorer: Derek Kevan; Ray Crawford (33 goals each)

Pos	Team	Pld	W	D	L	GF	GA	GAv	Pts	Qualification or relegation
1	Ipswich Town (C)	42	24	8	10	93	67	1.388	56	Qualification for the European Cup preliminary round
2	Burnley	42	21	11	10	101	67	1.507	53	
3	Tottenham Hotspur	42	21	10	11	88	69	1.275	52	Qualification for the European Cup Winners' Cup first round
4	Everton	42	20	11	11	88	54	1.630	51	Qualification for the Inter-Cities Fairs Cup first round
5	Sheffield United	42	19	9	14	61	69	0.884	47	
6	Sheffield Wednesday	42	20	6	16	72	58	1.241	46	
7	Aston Villa	42	18	8	16	65	56	1.161	44	
8	West Ham United	42	17	10	15	76	82	0.927	44	
9	West Bromwich Albion	42	15	13	14	83	67	1.239	43	
10	Arsenal	42	16	11	15	71	72	0.986	43	
11	Bolton Wanderers	42	16	10	16	62	66	0.939	42	
12	Manchester City	42	17	7	18	78	81	0.963	41	
13	Blackpool	42	15	11	16	70	75	0.933	41	
14	Leicester City	42	17	6	19	72	71	1.014	40	
15	Manchester United	42	15	9	18	72	75	0.960	39	
16	Blackburn Rovers	42	14	11	17	50	58	0.862	39	
17	Birmingham City	42	14	10	18	65	81	0.802	38	
18	Wolverhampton Wanderers	42	13	10	19	73	86	0.849	36	
19	Nottingham Forest	42	13	10	19	63	79	0.797	36	
20	Fulham	42	13	7	22	66	74	0.892	33	
21	Cardiff City (R)	42	9	14	19	50	81	0.617	32	Relegation to the Second Division
22	Chelsea (R)	42	9	10	23	63	94	0.670	28	Relegation to the Second Division

Source: World Football
Rules for classification: 1) Points; 2) Goal average; 3) Goals scored
(C) Champions; (R) Relegated

=== Results ===
Home \ Away	ARS	AST	BIR	BLB	BLP	BOL	BUR	CAR	CHE	EVE	FUL	IPS	LEI	MCI	MUN	NOT	SHU	SHW	TOT	WBA	WHU	WOL
Arsenal		4–5	1–1	0–0	3–0	1–2	2–2	1–1	0–3	2–3	1–0	0–3	4–4	3–0	5–1	2–1	2–0	1–0	2–1	0–1	2–2	3–1
Aston Villa	3–1		1–3	1–0	5–0	3–0	0–2	2–2	3–1	1–1	2–0	3–0	8–3	2–1	1–1	5–1	0–0	1–0	0–0	1–0	2–4	1–0
Birmingham	1–0	0–2		2–1	1–1	2–1	2–6	3–0	3–2	0–0	2–1	3–1	1–5	1–1	1–1	1–1	3–0	1–1	2–3	1–2	4–0	3–6
Blackburn Rovers	0–0	4–2	2–0		1–1	2–3	2–1	0–0	3–0	1–1	0–2	2–2	2–1	4–1	3–0	2–1	1–2	0–2	0–1	1–1	1–0	2–1
Blackpool	0–1	1–2	1–0	2–1		2–1	1–1	3–0	4–0	1–1	2–1	1–1	2–1	3–1	2–3	1–3	2–4	1–3	1–2	2–2	2–0	7–2
Bolton Wanderers	2–1	1–1	3–2	1–1	0–0		0–0	1–1	4–2	1–1	2–3	0–0	1–0	0–2	1–0	6–1	2–0	4–3	1–2	3–2	1–0	1–0
Burnley	0–2	3–0	7–1	0–1	2–0	3–1		2–1	1–1	2–1	2–1	4–3	2–0	6–3	1–3	0–0	4–2	4–0	2–2	3–1	6–0	3–3
Cardiff City	1–1	1–0	3–2	1–1	3–2	1–2	1–1		5–2	0–0	0–3	0–3	0–4	0–0	1–2	2–2	1–1	2–1	1–1	2–2	3–0	2–3
Chelsea	2–3	1–0	1–1	1–1	1–0	1–0	1–2	2–3		1–1	0–0	2–2	1–3	1–1	2–0	2–2	6–1	1–0	0–2	4–1	0–1	4–5
Everton	4–1	2–0	4–1	1–0	2–2	1–0	2–2	8–3	4–0		3–0	5–2	3–2	0–2	5–1	6–0	1–0	0–4	3–0	3–1	3–0	4–0
Fulham	5–2	3–1	0–1	2–0	0–1	2–2	3–5	0–1	3–4	2–1		1–2	2–1	3–4	2–0	1–1	5–2	0–2	1–1	1–2	2–0	0–1
Ipswich Town	2–2	2–0	4–1	2–1	1–1	2–1	6–2	1–0	5–2	4–2	2–4		1–0	2–4	4–1	1–0	4–0	2–1	3–2	3–0	4–2	3–2
Leicester City	0–1	0–2	1–2	2–0	0–2	1–1	2–6	3–0	2–0	2–0	4–1	0–2		2–0	4–3	2–1	4–1	1–0	2–3	1–0	2–2	3–0
Manchester City	3–2	1–0	1–4	3–1	2–4	2–1	1–3	1–2	2–2	1–3	2–1	3–0	3–1		0–2	3–0	1–1	3–1	6–2	3–1	3–5	2–2
Manchester United	2–3	2–0	0–2	6–1	0–1	0–3	1–4	3–0	3–2	1–1	3–0	5–0	2–2	3–2		6–3	0–1	1–1	1–0	4–1	1–2	0–2
Nottingham Forest	0–1	2–0	2–1	1–2	3–4	0–1	3–2	2–1	3–0	2–1	1–1	1–1	0–0	1–2	1–0		2–0	3–1	2–0	4–4	3–0	3–1
Sheffield United	2–1	0–2	3–1	0–0	2–1	3–1	2–0	1–0	3–1	1–1	2–2	2–1	3–1	3–1	2–3	2–0		1–0	1–1	1–1	1–4	2–1
Sheffield Wednesday	1–1	3–0	5–1	1–0	3–2	4–2	4–0	2–0	5–3	3–1	1–1	1–4	1–2	1–0	3–1	3–0	1–2		0–0	2–1	0–0	3–2
Tottenham Hotspur	4–3	1–0	3–1	4–1	5–2	2–2	4–2	3–2	5–2	3–1	4–2	1–3	1–2	2–0	2–2	4–2	3–3	4–0		1–2	2–2	1–0
West Bromwich Albion	4–0	1–1	0–0	4–0	7–1	6–2	1–1	5–1	4–0	2–0	2–0	1–3	2–0	2–2	1–1	2–2	3–1	0–2	2–4		0–1	1–1
West Ham United	3–3	2–0	2–2	2–3	2–2	1–0	2–1	4–1	2–1	3–1	4–2	2–2	4–1	0–4	1–1	3–2	1–2	2–3	2–1	3–3		4–2
Wolverhampton Wanderers	2–3	2–2	2–1	0–2	2–2	5–1	1–1	1–1	1–1	0–3	1–3	2–0	1–1	4–1	2–2	2–1	0–1	3–0	3–1	1–5	3–2	

Updated to match(es) played on unknown. Source: Ian Laschke: Rothmans Book of Football League Records 1888–89 to 1978–79. Macdonald and Jane's, London & Sydney, 1980.
Legend: Blue = home team win; Yellow = draw; Red = away team win.

=== Maps ===
Locations of the Football League First Division London teams 1961–1962
Locations of the Football League First Division 1961–1962 teams

== Second Division ==
Second Division
- Season: 1961–62
- Champions: Liverpool
- Promoted: Liverpool; Leyton Orient
- Relegated: Bristol Rovers; Brighton & Hove Albion
- Matches: 462
- Goals: 1,473 (3.19 per match)
- Top goalscorer: Roger Hunt (41 goals)

Pos	Team	Pld	W	D	L	GF	GA	GAv	Pts	Qualification or relegation
1	Liverpool (C, P)	42	27	8	7	99	43	2.302	62	Promotion to the First Division
2	Leyton Orient (P)	42	22	10	10	69	40	1.725	54	Promotion to the First Division
3	Sunderland	42	22	9	11	85	50	1.700	53	
4	Scunthorpe United	42	21	7	14	86	71	1.211	49	
5	Plymouth Argyle	42	19	8	15	75	75	1.000	46	
6	Southampton	42	18	9	15	77	62	1.242	45	
7	Huddersfield Town	42	16	12	14	67	59	1.136	44	
8	Stoke City	42	17	8	17	55	57	0.965	42	
9	Rotherham United	42	16	9	17	70	76	0.921	41	
10	Preston North End	42	15	10	17	55	57	0.965	40	
11	Newcastle United	42	15	9	18	64	58	1.103	39	
12	Middlesbrough	42	16	7	19	76	72	1.056	39	
13	Luton Town	42	17	5	20	69	71	0.972	39	
14	Walsall	42	14	11	17	70	75	0.933	39	
15	Charlton Athletic	42	15	9	18	69	75	0.920	39	
16	Derby County	42	14	11	17	68	75	0.907	39	
17	Norwich City	42	14	11	17	61	70	0.871	39	
18	Bury	42	17	5	20	52	76	0.684	39	
19	Leeds United	42	12	12	18	50	61	0.820	36	
20	Swansea Town	42	12	12	18	61	83	0.735	36	
21	Bristol Rovers (R)	42	13	7	22	53	81	0.654	33	Relegation to the Third Division
22	Brighton & Hove Albion (R)	42	10	11	21	42	86	0.488	31	Relegation to the Third Division

Rules for classification: 1) Points; 2) Goal average; 3) Goals scored
(C) Champions; (P) Promoted; (R) Relegated

=== Results ===
Home \ Away	B&HA	BRR	BRY	CHA	DER	HUD	LEE	LEY	LIV	LUT	MID	NEW	NWC	PLY	PNE	ROT	SCU	SOU	STK	SUN	SWA	WAL
Brighton & Hove Albion		1–0	0–2	2–2	1–2	2–2	1–3	0–1	0–0	2–1	2–0	0–4	2–1	3–2	0–0	0–3	0–3	0–0	2–1	1–1	2–2	3–2
Bristol Rovers	0–1		0–1	2–2	1–4	1–1	4–0	2–1	0–2	1–0	0–2	2–1	2–1	4–3	2–1	4–2	2–1	1–0	0–2	2–3	4–1	2–2
Bury	2–1	2–0		1–2	2–2	1–2	1–1	0–1	0–3	2–1	2–1	2–7	2–3	1–1	2–1	2–1	4–1	0–2	0–2	3–2	1–1	2–1
Charlton Athletic	2–3	2–1	1–0		4–0	0–2	3–1	1–2	0–4	0–1	1–0	1–1	2–2	3–1	4–0	0–2	3–3	1–0	2–2	2–0	3–2	3–3
Derby County	2–0	4–1	3–0	0–1		1–0	3–3	1–2	2–0	2–0	3–2	1–2	1–1	2–2	3–2	1–1	2–2	1–1	2–0	1–1	6–3	1–3
Huddersfield Town	2–0	4–1	2–0	0–2	4–0		2–1	1–1	1–2	1–2	0–0	2–1	1–1	5–1	2–2	0–3	1–2	1–0	3–0	0–0	3–1	4–2
Leeds United	1–1	0–0	0–0	1–0	0–0	1–0		0–0	1–0	2–1	2–0	0–1	0–1	2–3	1–2	1–3	1–4	1–1	3–1	1–0	2–0	4–1
Leyton Orient	4–1	2–3	2–0	2–1	2–0	3–0	0–0		2–2	0–0	2–0	2–0	2–0	1–2	0–2	1–1	0–1	1–3	3–0	1–1	1–0	3–0
Liverpool	3–1	2–0	5–0	2–1	4–1	1–1	5–0	3–3		1–1	5–1	2–0	5–4	2–1	4–1	4–1	2–1	2–0	2–1	3–0	5–0	6–1
Luton Town	2–1	2–0	4–0	1–6	4–2	3–4	3–2	1–3	1–0		3–2	1–0	1–2	0–2	4–1	4–3	1–2	1–4	0–0	1–2	5–1	2–0
Middlesbrough	4–0	5–0	2–1	3–2	3–4	1–0	1–3	2–3	2–0	2–4		3–0	2–1	1–1	1–0	5–1	1–2	1–1	2–2	0–1	1–3	3–0
Newcastle United	5–0	5–2	1–2	4–1	3–0	1–1	0–3	0–0	1–2	4–1	3–4		0–0	0–2	0–2	1–0	2–1	3–2	2–0	2–2	2–2	1–0
Norwich City	3–0	2–2	3–1	2–2	3–2	1–2	2–0	0–0	1–2	0–4	5–4	0–0		0–2	2–0	0–1	2–2	1–1	1–0	3–1	2–1	3–1
Plymouth Argyle	5–0	3–1	1–2	2–1	2–3	4–2	1–1	2–1	2–3	0–3	1–1	1–1	3–1		1–0	2–5	3–1	4–0	3–1	3–2	0–0	2–1
Preston North End	3–1	1–0	1–2	2–0	1–0	1–0	1–1	3–2	1–3	2–0	4–3	0–1	2–0	1–1		2–0	4–1	1–1	1–2	0–1	1–1	2–3
Rotherham United	2–1	4–0	2–0	3–2	2–2	3–3	2–1	2–1	1–0	1–1	0–1	0–0	3–1	1–3	2–2		0–1	4–2	1–2	0–3	1–2	2–2
Scunthorpe United	3–3	2–1	1–2	6–1	2–0	1–3	2–1	0–2	1–1	2–0	1–1	3–2	2–0	5–1	2–1	5–2		5–1	2–2	3–1	2–0	2–1
Southampton	6–1	0–2	5–3	1–2	2–1	3–1	4–1	1–2	2–0	3–0	1–3	1–0	2–2	1–2	0–0	2–1	6–4		5–1	2–0	5–1	1–1
Stoke City	0–1	2–1	1–3	4–0	1–1	3–0	2–1	0–1	0–0	2–1	2–0	3–1	3–1	2–0	1–1	1–2	1–0	3–2		1–0	0–0	2–1
Sunderland	0–0	6–1	3–0	4–1	2–1	3–1	2–1	2–1	1–4	2–2	2–1	3–0	2–0	5–0	0–0	4–0	4–0	3–0	2–1		7–2	3–0
Swansea Town	3–0	1–1	0–1	1–0	3–1	1–1	2–1	1–3	4–2	3–2	3–3	3–2	0–3	5–0	1–2	2–2	2–1	0–1	1–0	1–1		1–3
Walsall	2–2	0–0	3–0	2–2	2–0	2–2	1–1	1–5	1–1	2–0	1–2	1–0	5–0	1–0	2–1	5–0	4–1	0–2	3–1	4–3	0–0	

Updated to match(es) played on unknown. Source: Ian Laschke: Rothmans Book of Football League Records 1888–89 to 1978–79. Macdonald and Jane's, London & Sydney, 1980.
Legend: Blue = home team win; Yellow = draw; Red = away team win.

=== Maps ===
Locations of the Football League Second Division London teams 1961–1962
Locations of the Football League Second Division 1961–1962 teams

== Third Division ==
Football League Third Division
- Season: 1961–62
- Champions: Portsmouth (1st title)
- Promoted: Grimsby Town
- Relegated: Brentford, Lincoln City, Newport County, Torquay United
- Matches: 552
- Goals: 1,772 (3.21 per match)
- Top goalscorer: Cliff Holton (Watford and Northampton Town) 37

Pos	Team	Pld	W	D	L	GF	GA	GAv	Pts	Promotion or relegation
1	Portsmouth (C, P)	46	27	11	8	87	47	1.851	65	Promotion to the Second Division
2	Grimsby Town (P)	46	28	6	12	80	56	1.429	62	Promotion to the Second Division
3	Bournemouth & Boscombe Athletic	46	21	17	8	69	45	1.533	59	
4	Queens Park Rangers	46	24	11	11	111	73	1.521	59	
5	Peterborough United	46	26	6	14	107	82	1.305	58	
6	Bristol City	46	23	8	15	94	72	1.306	54	
7	Reading	46	22	9	15	77	66	1.167	53	
8	Northampton Town	46	20	11	15	85	57	1.491	51	
9	Swindon Town	46	17	15	14	78	71	1.099	49	
10	Hull City	46	20	8	18	67	54	1.241	48	
11	Bradford (Park Avenue)	46	20	7	19	80	78	1.026	47	
12	Port Vale	46	17	11	18	65	58	1.121	45	
13	Notts County	46	17	9	20	67	74	0.905	43	
14	Coventry City	46	16	11	19	64	71	0.901	43	
15	Crystal Palace	46	14	14	18	83	80	1.038	42	
16	Southend United	46	13	16	17	57	69	0.826	42	
17	Watford	46	14	13	19	63	74	0.851	41	
18	Halifax Town	46	15	10	21	62	84	0.738	40	
19	Shrewsbury Town	46	13	12	21	73	84	0.869	38	
20	Barnsley	46	13	12	21	71	95	0.747	38	
21	Torquay United (R)	46	15	6	25	76	100	0.760	36	Relegation to the Fourth Division
22	Lincoln City (R)	46	9	17	20	57	87	0.655	35	Relegation to the Fourth Division
23	Brentford (R)	46	13	8	25	53	93	0.570	34	Relegation to the Fourth Division
24	Newport County (R)	46	7	8	31	46	102	0.451	22	Relegation to the Fourth Division

(C) Champions; (P) Promoted; (R) Relegated

=== Results ===
Home \ Away	BAR	B&BA	BPA	BRE	BRI	COV	CRY	GRI	HAL	HUL	LIN	NPC	NOR	NTC	PET	POR	PTV	QPR	REA	SHR	STD	SWI	TOR	WAT
Barnsley		2–2	1–2	2–2	7–3	2–1	0–3	0–3	1–2	1–0	0–1	1–1	3–2	2–0	0–3	2–2	2–1	2–4	2–3	1–1	1–1	6–2	4–2	3–0
Bournemouth & Boscombe Athletic	5–0		2–2	1–1	2–1	1–1	1–0	2–3	2–1	1–1	0–0	2–1	3–2	2–1	1–1	2–0	1–0	3–1	1–0	0–0	3–0	0–0	3–1	4–1
Bradford Park Avenue	3–2	1–2		1–2	2–0	0–0	2–0	0–1	2–0	1–0	2–0	4–1	1–2	3–2	6–2	2–1	2–1	3–3	1–3	1–1	4–0	2–2	3–1	1–1
Brentford	1–1	2–2	2–0		0–2	2–1	4–2	0–2	0–2	0–2	1–0	3–1	3–0	0–1	2–0	3–2	1–2	1–4	1–2	4–0	0–0	1–0	0–2	3–1
Bristol City	0–0	2–1	6–1	3–0		3–2	2–2	3–0	4–3	1–1	2–0	1–2	1–0	6–0	1–2	0–4	0–1	2–0	5–0	0–1	3–2	5–3	4–1	2–1
Coventry City	1–1	0–1	3–0	2–0	1–1		0–2	2–0	3–1	0–2	2–2	3–0	1–0	2–2	1–3	2–0	0–1	2–3	1–0	4–1	3–3	2–1	2–2	1–0
Crystal Palace	1–3	0–0	0–0	2–2	2–3	2–2		4–1	4–3	1–2	1–3	2–0	1–4	4–1	5–2	1–2	0–0	2–2	3–4	2–1	2–2	3–1	7–2	1–1
Grimsby Town	4–0	3–0	3–2	1–0	1–0	2–0	0–0		3–0	1–0	4–1	1–0	3–2	2–1	2–1	1–0	1–1	1–1	4–0	2–1	3–1	0–1	2–3	5–3
Halifax Town	3–1	3–1	2–3	1–0	3–4	0–2	1–1	3–3		2–1	0–3	0–0	1–3	1–2	2–1	0–1	3–3	1–1	2–1	1–2	0–2	2–0	1–0	2–0
Hull City	4–0	2–1	0–1	3–0	3–2	3–1	2–4	2–1	1–2		1–0	4–0	1–0	2–1	1–1	0–1	3–1	3–1	0–1	3–1	0–0	0–1	4–0	1–0
Lincoln City	2–2	0–2	3–2	3–3	1–1	1–2	3–2	1–1	0–1	0–3		3–2	0–0	2–2	1–2	2–2	1–1	0–5	2–3	1–2	2–0	2–2	1–3	0–0
Newport County	0–2	0–1	1–2	6–1	3–1	1–2	2–1	0–2	0–1	0–2	4–0		0–0	2–0	2–3	0–5	1–1	2–4	0–0	3–2	0–3	2–2	0–3	0–0
Northampton Town	3–1	0–3	2–0	5–0	0–1	4–1	1–1	7–0	3–1	2–0	2–2	5–0		1–2	2–2	2–2	1–1	1–1	1–0	3–1	3–1	1–2	1–2	2–0
Notts County	0–2	3–2	4–2	3–1	1–0	2–0	0–0	2–0	0–0	3–0	1–0	8–1	1–4		2–2	2–1	2–3	0–0	2–2	3–2	2–0	0–1	2–0	1–0
Peterborough United	4–2	1–2	1–0	6–0	3–4	2–3	4–1	2–1	5–1	3–2	5–4	2–1	0–2	2–0		0–1	1–3	5–1	1–0	0–3	4–1	3–2	2–1	4–3
Portsmouth	3–2	1–1	4–2	4–0	5–0	3–2	2–1	0–2	1–1	2–1	0–0	2–2	4–1	0–0	0–3		1–0	4–1	2–0	3–1	1–0	2–2	2–0	2–1
Port Vale	2–0	1–0	3–2	3–0	0–2	2–0	0–1	0–2	1–1	4–0	4–0	3–0	1–1	1–0	0–1	2–3		2–3	2–1	4–1	0–0	1–1	4–1	1–3
Queens Park Rangers	3–0	1–1	1–2	3–0	4–1	4–1	1–0	3–2	6–2	1–1	1–3	4–0	2–0	2–0	3–3	0–1	2–1		3–6	3–1	5–3	6–1	6–0	1–2
Reading	0–0	0–1	3–1	4–0	2–2	4–0	2–1	1–2	3–2	1–1	4–0	2–1	2–0	4–2	3–2	0–3	0–0	0–2		3–0	3–1	1–1	1–0	3–2
Shrewsbury Town	4–1	2–2	4–1	1–3	2–2	1–1	1–5	1–2	0–0	2–0	0–0	4–1	1–3	3–0	3–4	0–1	4–2	1–2	4–1		1–1	1–3	1–1	5–1
Southend	1–2	0–0	2–1	0–0	1–0	2–0	2–2	2–0	2–1	2–1	0–0	1–0	1–3	3–2	1–1	2–2	4–1	2–3	0–2	1–1		0–2	2–1	0–1
Swindon Town	1–1	1–1	3–2	5–2	0–4	3–3	5–0	0–0	6–0	1–1	4–0	3–0	2–2	1–0	3–2	1–3	1–0	0–0	4–1	1–2	0–0		0–1	3–1
Torquay United	6–2	2–1	1–3	3–1	1–3	1–0	1–2	1–2	2–3	4–2	3–4	3–2	1–2	3–3	1–3	0–2	2–0	2–2	0–0	3–1	2–2	3–0		3–4
Watford	3–1	0–0	0–2	2–1	1–1	0–1	3–2	2–1	0–0	1–1	3–3	3–1	0–0	3–1	2–3	0–0	2–0	3–2	1–1	1–1	1–3	2–0	4–1	

Updated to match(es) played on unknown. Source: Ian Laschke: Rothmans Book of Football League Records 1888–89 to 1978–79. Macdonald and Jane's, London & Sydney, 1980.
Legend: Blue = home team win; Yellow = draw; Red = away team win.

=== Maps ===
Locations of the Football League Third Division London teams 1961–1962
Locations of the Football League Third Division teams 1961–1962

== Fourth Division ==
Football League Fourth Division
- Season: 1961–62
- Champions: Millwall (1st title)
- Promoted: Carlisle United, Colchester United, Wrexham
- Failed re-election: None
- Resigned: Accrington Stanley
- Matches: 506
- Goals: 1,690 (3.34 per match)
- Top goalscorer: Bobby Hunt (Colchester United), 37

Pos	Team	Pld	W	D	L	GF	GA	GAv	Pts	Promotion or relegation
1	Millwall (C, P)	44	23	10	11	87	62	1.403	56	Promotion to the Third Division
2	Colchester United (P)	44	23	9	12	104	71	1.465	55	Promotion to the Third Division
3	Wrexham (P)	44	22	9	13	96	56	1.714	53	Promotion to the Third Division
4	Carlisle United (P)	44	22	8	14	64	63	1.016	52	Promotion to the Third Division
5	Bradford City	44	21	9	14	94	86	1.093	51	
6	York City	44	20	10	14	84	53	1.585	50	
7	Aldershot	44	22	5	17	81	60	1.350	49	
8	Workington	44	19	11	14	69	70	0.986	49	
9	Barrow	44	17	14	13	74	58	1.276	48	
10	Crewe Alexandra	44	20	6	18	79	70	1.129	46	
11	Oldham Athletic	44	17	12	15	77	70	1.100	46	
12	Rochdale	44	19	7	18	71	71	1.000	45	
13	Darlington	44	18	9	17	61	73	0.836	45	
14	Mansfield Town	44	19	6	19	77	66	1.167	44	
15	Tranmere Rovers	44	20	4	20	70	81	0.864	44	
16	Stockport County	44	17	9	18	70	69	1.014	43	
17	Southport	44	17	9	18	61	71	0.859	43	
18	Exeter City	44	13	11	20	62	77	0.805	37	
19	Chesterfield	44	14	9	21	70	87	0.805	37	
20	Gillingham	44	13	11	20	73	94	0.777	37	
21	Doncaster Rovers	44	11	7	26	60	85	0.706	29	Re-elected
22	Hartlepools United	44	8	11	25	52	101	0.515	27	Re-elected
23	Chester	44	7	12	25	54	96	0.563	26	Re-elected
24	Accrington Stanley	0	0	0	0	0	0	—	0	Resigned from the league, club folded years later (Note: Accrington Stanley resigned from the Football League on 11 March. Their record (P33 W5 D8 L20 GF19 GA60 GR 0.317 Pts 18) was expunged.)

Source: rsssf.com
(C) Champions; (P) Promoted

=== Results ===
Home \ Away	ACC	ALD	BRW	BRA	CRL	CHE	CHF	COL	CRE	DAR	DON	EXE	GIL	HAR	MAN	MIL	OLD	ROC	SOU	STP	TRA	WRK	WRE	YOR
Accrington Stanley		0–2	2–2	0–2	1–0	0–1	0–0	0–4	1–0	3–1					0–0	0–2	1–0	0–2		1–2	1–1	0–4	0–2	
Aldershot	2–2		3–1	2–2	0–1	6–2	1–1	1–0	1–0	6–1	3–1	1–1	4–0	1–1	4–2	0–2	3–1	3–0	2–0	4–1	3–1	3–1	3–1	2–0
Barrow	3–1	2–2		1–1	0–3	3–2	1–0	4–0	3–0	3–0	4–1	3–0	7–0	5–1	1–1	2–2	3–1	0–1	1–1	3–1	2–0	1–1	0–2	0–0
Bradford City	0–1	2–1	1–1		3–2	2–0	0–2	4–1	3–3	3–2	2–0	5–1	5–2	5–1	6–1	2–4	1–1	1–0	1–0	1–3	3–1	1–1	5–3	2–2
Carlisle United	2–0	2–1	0–0	2–4		2–0	3–1	1–1	3–0	1–0	1–0	2–1	1–2	1–0	1–0	3–2	2–0	2–2	2–1	1–0	0–3	1–2	1–0	3–2
Chester	0–0	2–3	2–3	1–2	1–1		4–1	2–2	1–0	2–2	2–3	1–1	1–1	4–4	0–1	2–4	1–0	2–3	2–0	2–0	1–1	1–3	1–1	1–1
Chesterfield		2–3	2–2	2–1	1–3	4–1		4–1	3–1	1–1	3–0	2–0	3–2	2–0	0–4	2–3	2–3	1–0	3–2	3–2	1–2	0–1	1–5	1–1
Colchester United	3–2	3–0	1–1	9–1	2–0	5–2	3–3		5–3	2–0	5–3	2–0	6–0	6–1	2–0	2–2	5–1	1–1	2–0	3–0	3–0	6–1	2–4	3–1
Crewe Alexandra	4–0	2–0	1–1	1–2	3–0	1–1	2–1	4–0		5–1	2–0	3–1	5–2	3–0	3–2	2–1	3–5	2–1	3–1	3–2	3–0	2–0	0–3	0–0
Darlington	1–1	2–0	1–0	3–3	2–1	2–0	4–4	0–2	2–1		1–0	1–0	1–1	1–2	3–1	1–5	3–0	2–0	1–2	3–0	2–1	1–1	1–0	0–0
Doncaster Rovers	1–1	2–1	3–2	2–0	1–2	2–0	0–0	1–4	3–0	1–2		3–1	2–1	2–2	0–1	1–2	0–0	1–2	1–2	1–1	6–1	1–1	0–2	1–2
Exeter City	3–0	2–1	3–0	1–2	4–0	5–0	4–1	0–2	2–1	0–1	1–5		1–3	1–1	2–1	1–1	3–3	1–3	1–1	4–3	1–0	3–1	1–1	2–1
Gillingham	5–1	0–1	3–2	3–1	4–1	0–0	5–1	2–1	0–1	2–2	2–2	2–2		4–0	2–2	3–1	0–2	4–2	4–0	1–1	0–1	4–2	2–3	1–2
Hartlepool		0–2	2–3	1–3	0–3	1–3	1–2	1–1	2–1	2–0	3–0	0–0	1–3		0–1	2–0	1–1	3–1	4–2	2–2	0–0	0–1	1–4	0–2
Mansfield Town		4–1	0–1	0–1	5–2	3–0	2–2	4–0	1–1	3–0	4–0	3–1	3–1	3–1		0–0	2–0	0–1	3–1	2–0	1–2	4–1	1–2	3–1
Millwall		2–1	1–0	1–2	3–0	2–0	2–1	2–0	4–3	4–2	2–0	2–0	0–0	3–2	4–0		2–0	1–1	1–1	1–3	3–0	5–0	0–1	2–1
Oldham Athletic	5–0	2–1	3–2	2–2	5–0	4–1	3–1	2–2	2–0	0–1	3–1	1–1	1–1	5–2	2–3	4–2		2–2	2–1	0–0	2–0	0–2	1–1	1–0
Rochdale	1–0	1–0	0–2	4–1	1–1	3–2	1–1	0–1	3–0	1–3	2–3	3–0	3–1	3–1	3–2	4–1	3–1		2–0	3–3	1–0	1–3	2–1	3–1
Southport		2–1	0–0	2–1	0–0	1–0	0–2	3–0	2–0	1–4	3–1	1–1	1–1	0–1	2–1	3–1	0–5	3–0		2–1	2–1	1–1	4–2	3–1
Stockport County	2–0	3–1	3–0	3–1	1–2	0–1	2–1	1–4	0–1	3–0	2–1	1–0	3–1	1–1	2–1	1–1	1–1	5–2	1–4		3–0	3–1	1–2	2–1
Tranmere	2–0	1–2	2–1	3–2	0–3	4–1	1–0	5–2	1–6	0–0	3–2	3–4	4–2	3–2	2–0	5–1	3–1	2–0	3–1	1–3		3–2	2–0	2–2
Workington		2–1	1–2	5–3	2–1	4–1	2–0	1–2	0–1	2–1	0–0	3–1	5–1	1–1	1–1	2–2	0–2	2–1	3–0	1–1	2–1		1–0	0–0
Wrexham		2–1	1–1	2–1	2–2	0–0	4–2	0–0	1–1	5–0	3–1	1–2	3–0	10–1	5–0	2–2	2–1	3–0	2–3	0–1	4–0	2–3		2–1
York City	1–0	0–1	5–0	4–0	1–1	5–1	4–0	5–0	4–2	2–1	5–2	2–1	4–0	2–0	2–1	0–1	4–1	2–1	2–2	1–0	1–2	4–0	3–2	

Updated to match(es) played on unknown. Source: Ian Laschke: Rothmans Book of Football League Records 1888–89 to 1978–79. Macdonald and Jane's, London & Sydney, 1980.
Legend: Blue = home team win; Yellow = draw; Red = away team win.
- The game between Barrow and Gillingham on the 9th of October was abandoned after 76 minutes with Barrow winning 7-0 due to poor light. The result was allowed to stand - the match started late due to Gillingham having various transport problems getting to the stadium.

=== Maps ===
Locations of the Football League Fourth Division London teams 1961–1962
Locations of the Football League Fourth Division teams 1961–1962

== Attendances ==
=== Division One ===
No.	Club	Average	±	Highest	Lowest
1	Tottenham Hotspur FC	45,576	-14.2%	59,371	32,509
2	Everton FC	41,432	-4.6%	54,369	30,391
3	Arsenal FC	34,447	0.4%	63,440	18,771
4	Manchester United	33,491	-11.6%	57,135	20,807
5	Aston Villa FC	32,056	-4.6%	49,892	22,174
6	Sheffield Wednesday FC	28,401	-2.8%	50,791	17,475
7	Burnley FC	27,125	13.8%	46,810	21,526
8	Chelsea FC	27,013	-10.4%	51,282	12,404
9	West Ham United FC	25,733	17.2%	36,274	18,213
10	Manchester City FC	25,626	-12.9%	49,959	15,971
11	Wolverhampton Wanderers FC	24,803	-19.7%	45,687	14,597
12	Fulham FC	24,401	6.0%	43,355	12,639
13	Birmingham City FC	23,537	-8.7%	43,489	17,214
14	Nottingham Forest FC	23,517	-4.7%	40,875	17,419
15	Ipswich Town FC	22,863	51.5%	30,649	16,587
16	Sheffield United FC	22,526	21.8%	38,497	16,838
17	West Bromwich Albion FC	21,006	-15.0%	39,071	13,894
18	Leicester City FC	19,469	-19.1%	29,396	14,093
19	Cardiff City FC	19,294	-17.5%	33,606	8,608
20	Blackpool FC	18,618	-0.5%	31,660	10,641
21	Bolton Wanderers FC	17,519	-19.2%	34,366	11,231
22	Blackburn Rovers FC	15,906	-17.8%	33,914	8,876

=== Division Two ===
No.	Club	Average	±	Highest	Lowest
1	Liverpool FC	39,223	32.5%	52,517	29,957
2	Sunderland AFC	32,990	26.6%	57,666	21,706
3	Newcastle United FC	27,946	5.5%	53,991	18,775
4	Norwich City FC	20,241	-17.3%	31,304	14,206
5	Derby County FC	15,930	13.0%	27,355	6,739
6	Middlesbrough FC	15,810	-0.3%	35,666	9,955
7	Stoke City FC	15,751	70.2%	35,974	7,530
8	Leyton Orient FC	14,750	40.0%	25,857	8,957
9	Charlton Athletic FC	14,211	28.0%	29,298	7,861
10	Plymouth Argyle FC	13,989	-20.6%	20,531	8,734
11	Southampton FC	13,763	-26.3%	21,445	8,107
12	Leeds United FC	13,607	1.2%	21,482	7,967
13	Huddersfield Town AFC	13,213	-1.6%	23,086	5,256
14	Brighton & Hove Albion FC	13,206	-14.9%	22,744	8,732
15	Preston North End FC	13,067	-22.2%	29,243	8,326
16	Walsall FC	12,703	19.2%	25,453	7,173
17	Swansea City AFC	12,174	0.7%	19,600	5,425
18	Bristol Rovers FC	12,096	-18.8%	18,705	8,845
19	Luton Town FC	10,525	-16.3%	15,380	6,123
20	Bury FC	10,518	3.0%	21,432	4,908
21	Scunthorpe United FC	9,829	7.0%	14,158	7,188
22	Rotherham United FC	9,550	0.0%	15,657	3,492

=== Division Three ===
No.	Club	Average	±	Highest	Lowest
1	Crystal Palace FC	17,481	-8.4%	28,886	7,041
2	Portsmouth FC	16,652	10.8%	22,654	11,546
3	Bristol City FC	12,447	8.3%	22,124	6,674
4	Peterborough United FC	12,392	-12.8%	18,078	7,738
5	AFC Bournemouth	11,622	48.8%	22,940	8,370
6	Reading FC	11,242	46.1%	23,078	4,847
7	Queens Park Rangers FC	11,121	11.7%	18,003	7,087
8	Northampton Town FC	10,899	2.0%	17,324	7,563
9	Watford FC	10,609	-15.8%	20,889	4,961
10	Coventry City FC	10,256	-14.5%	19,922	5,907
11	Swindon Town FC	9,695	-12.2%	17,307	6,634
12	Grimsby Town FC	9,469	1.9%	14,531	5,585
13	Port Vale FC	8,993	-7.3%	18,797	4,770
14	Bradford Park Avenue AFC	8,871	-3.7%	12,104	2,802
15	Brentford FC	8,483	14.8%	18,127	3,583
16	Notts County FC	8,352	-30.2%	19,466	3,688
17	Southend United FC	7,922	-2.2%	13,049	4,415
18	Hull City AFC	6,887	-18.3%	14,376	3,237
19	Shrewsbury Town FC	6,591	-17.9%	12,547	3,880
20	Barnsley FC	6,100	-6.0%	10,818	2,371
21	Lincoln City FC	5,868	-21.0%	13,989	3,617
22	Newport County AFC	5,023	-7.7%	11,018	2,003
23	Torquay United FC	4,982	-19.0%	10,319	3,176
24	Halifax Town AFC	4,670	-15.8%	9,583	1,813

=== Division Four ===
No.	Club	Average	±	Highest	Lowest
1	Millwall FC	11,762	21.2%	19,666	8,856
2	Wrexham AFC	11,490	80.1%	16,507	6,167
3	Oldham Athletic FC	11,324	-10.4%	17,029	4,641
4	Tranmere Rovers	8,079	-14.6%	14,831	3,720
5	Mansfield Town FC	7,264	47.2%	12,428	3,291
6	Carlisle United FC	6,664	49.9%	12,660	3,866
7	York City FC	6,590	-4.5%	9,767	4,473
8	Bradford City AFC	6,240	-16.2%	10,036	3,031
9	Aldershot Town FC	6,143	-2.5%	8,360	3,833
10	Gillingham FC	5,656	-5.8%	8,962	2,964
11	Darlington FC	5,602	-5.0%	9,004	2,289
12	Chester City FC	5,578	14.0%	14,462	2,153
13	Crewe Alexandra FC	5,428	-26.2%	10,439	3,163
14	Colchester United FC	5,341	7.6%	7,148	3,782
15	Stockport County FC	4,824	-25.8%	10,565	2,352
16	Doncaster Rovers FC	4,471	-6.0%	8,610	1,981
17	Barrow AFC	4,446	3.4%	6,732	2,900
18	Exeter City FC	4,344	-16.1%	6,427	2,741
19	Hartlepool United FC	4,321	5.6%	6,918	2,239
20	Chesterfield FC	4,237	-18.2%	10,939	2,509
21	Southport FC	4,233	-8.9%	6,438	2,889
22	Rochdale AFC	4,024	2.4%	9,213	1,940
23	Workington AFC	3,392	5.7%	5,914	2,000
24	Accrington Stanley FC	2,688	-23.9%	4,396	1,430

== See also ==
- 1961-62 in English football
- 1961 in association football
- 1962 in association football
