= Henk van Stee =

Dutch footballer and manager

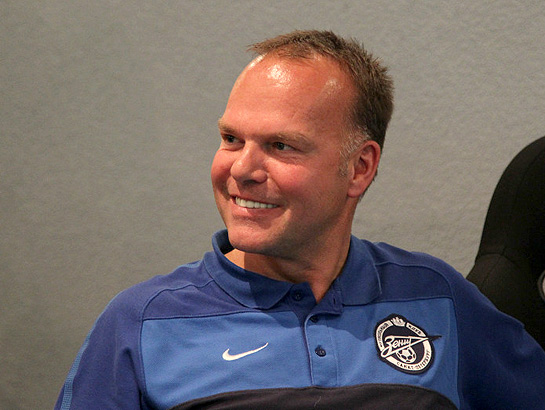

Personal information
- Date of birth: 17 December 1961 (age 64)
- Place of birth: Rotterdam, South Holland, Netherlands
- Position: Midfielder

Team information
- Current team: Zenit St Petersburg (academy dir.)

Senior career*
| Years | Team | Apps | (Gls) |
| 1985–1989 | Sparta | 70 | (4) |

Managerial career
- 1995: Sparta
- 1996–1998: VVV
- 2000: Feyenoord
- 2000–2002: AZ
- 2003–2004: Excelsior
- 2006–2008: Shakhtar Donetsk (youth)
- De Graafschap
- 2009–: Zenit St Petersburg (academy dir.)
- * Club domestic league appearances and goals

Henk van Stee (Dutch pronunciation: [ˈɦɛŋk fɑn ˈsteː]; born 17 December 1961) is a former football midfielder from the Netherlands, who played for Sparta Rotterdam and De Graafschap. He retired in 1990, and became a football manager, who worked for Sparta Rotterdam, VVV-Venlo, Feyenoord Rotterdam, AZ Alkmaar and Excelsior Rotterdam. Currently he works as the youth academy director for FC Zenit Saint Petersburg.
