= Nick Hencher =

Welsh footballer

Personal information
- Full name: Nicholas Hencher
- Date of birth: 24 August 1961 (age 65)
- Place of birth: Wrexham, Wales
- Height: 5 ft 7 in (1.70 m)
- Position: Winger

Senior career*
| Years | Team | Apps | (Gls) |
- Lex XI
| 1985–1988 | Wrexham | 32 | (5) |
- Lex XI
- * Club domestic league appearances and goals

Nicholas Hencher (born 24 August 1961) is a Welsh former professional footballer who played as a winger. He made appearances in the English Football League with Wrexham under non-contract terms. He also played for Lex XI in the Welsh league.
