= César Baena =

Venezuelan footballer (born 1961)

Cesar Baena
Personal information
- Full name: Cesar Renato Baena
- Date of birth: January 13, 1961 (age 65)
- Place of birth: Caracas, Venezuela
- Position: Goalkeeper

Senior career*
Years	Team	Apps	(Gls)
1982–2002	Caracas	??	(??)

International career
1983–2002	Venezuela	21	(0)

Managerial career
- 2005: Caracas
- 2006–2007: Trujillanos
- * Club domestic league appearances and goals

Cesar Renato Baena (born January 13, 1961, in Caracas) is a retired professional footballer from Venezuela, who played as a goalkeeper during his career. Baena played professional football in Venezuela for Caracas FC. He obtained a total number of 21 caps for the Venezuela national football team.

== Honours ==
=== Club ===
- Caracas FC
  - Venezuelan Primera División (4):
    - 1991–1992, 1993–1994, 1996–1997, 2000–2001
  - Copa Venezuela (4):
    - 1988, 1994, 1995, 2001
  - Venezuelan Segunda División (1):
    - 1984
