= Ryszard Rybak =

Polish footballer

Personal information
- Date of birth: 27 January 1960 (age 66)
- Place of birth: Grodzisk Wielkopolski, Poland
- Height: 1.72 m (5 ft 8 in)
- Position: Midfielder

Senior career*
Years	Team	Apps	(Gls)
1981–1984	Olimpia Poznań		
1985–1987	Lech Poznań	74	(8)
1987–1988	FC St. Pauli	0	(0)
1988–1989	Lech Poznań	30	(2)
1989–1992	AS Lyon-Duchère		
1993–1995	Luboński KS		
1995–1996	Orzeł Wałcz		
1996–1998	Dyskobolia Grodzisk Wielkopolski		
2004–2005	GKS Dopiewo		
- * Club domestic league appearances and goals

Ryszard Rybak (born 27 January 1960) is a Polish former professional footballer who played as a midfielder.

== Honours ==
Lech Poznań

- Polish Cup: 1987–88
