= Pat McQuillan =

Northern Irish footballer (born 1961)

Personal information
- Full name: Pat McQuillan
- Date of birth: 27 June 1961
- Place of birth: Belfast, Northern Ireland
- Position: Defender

Senior career*
Years	Team	Apps	(Gls)
?–1979	Pembroke Borough		
1979–?	Swansea City	0	(0)
- Pembroke Borough
1983–	Swansea City	25	(1)
- * Club domestic league appearances and goals

Pat McQuillan (born 27 June 1961) is a Northern Irish former footballer who played in the Football League for Swansea City.

McQuillan made his Football League debut for Swansea in a Division Two match on 31 December 1983 in a victory over Derby County.
