= Karsten Härtel =

German footballer

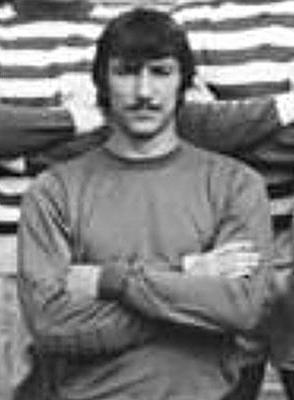
- Karsten Härtel in September 1983

Personal information
- Date of birth: 4 April 1961 (age 65)
- Place of birth: East Germany
- Height: 1.84 m (6 ft 1/2 in)
- Position: Goalkeeper

Youth career
- 1980–1981: FC Carl Zeiss Jena

Senior career*
Years	Team	Apps	(Gls)
1981–1986	FC Carl Zeiss Jena		
1987–1990	Hallescher FC		
1992–1996	Alemannia Aachen		
1996–1997	Bonner SC		
- * Club domestic league appearances and goals

Karsten Härtel (born 4 April 1961) is a former German footballer. He played as a goalkeeper at club level from the early-1980s to the mid-1990s. He is best known for playing for Hallescher FC from 1987 to 1989 in the DDR-Oberliga, the top level football league in East Germany. Following the German reunification, he played for Alemannia Aachen and Bonner SC.
