= Gian Piero Ventrone =

Italian athletic trainer (1960–2022)

Personal information
- Date of birth: 14 April 1960
- Place of birth: Naples, Italy
- Date of death: 6 October 2022 (aged 62)
- Place of death: Naples, Italy

Managerial career
- Years: Team
- 1994–1999: Juventus (athletic trainer)
- 2001–2004: Juventus (athletic trainer)
- 2004–2006: Italy (athletic trainer)
- 2007–2009: Bari (athletic trainer)
- 2009–2010: Atalanta (athletic trainer)
- 2010–2011: Siena (athletic trainer)
- 2012–2014: Ajaccio (assistant coach)
- 2014–2015: Catania (athletic trainer)
- 2016–2017: Jiangsu (athletic trainer)
- 2019–2021: Guangzhou (athletic trainer)
- 2021–2022: Tottenham Hotspur (athletic trainer)

Gian Piero Ventrone (14 April 1960 – 6 October 2022) was an Italian athletic trainer.

An ISEF-qualified teacher, he started his career in 1994, as athletic trainer for Marcello Lippi's Juventus until 1999 and from 2001 and 2004. Once his Juventus experience ended, he collaborated with Lippi in the preparation for the 2006 FIFA World Cup, won by Italy. He continued at Atalanta from September 2009 to January 2010. He worked with Antonio Conte at Bari and Siena and with Fabrizio Ravanelli, a player he trained at Juventus, as an assistant coach at Ajaccio. He had been athletic trainer at Catania, Jiangsu and at Fabio Cannavaro's Guangzhou in the 2017–18 season, before joining his friend Conte at Tottenham Hotspur in November 2021.

== Profile ==
=== Style of work ===
When Ventrone joined Juventus, he brought 43 computers for the pursuit of perfection in every exercise and tools no one had ever used. He made the players train by making them listen to the music of Queen and of Nirvana. He gave the players a bell called the "bell of shame"; those who were exhausted would ring it. He explained its use with, "in this sport there is no limit".

=== Reception ===
Ventrone was nicknamed "marine" for his very hard and tiring training sessions. His rhythms and workloads knocked out a number of professional athletes. Images of Harry Kane collapsing and vomiting and Son Heung-min almost fainting and lying agonising on the ground in a summer preparation in Seoul went viral. Alessio Tacchinardi, who was coached by Ventrone, considered Ventrone "a good sergeant, a reference point for everyone and a jackhammer".

== Personal life and death ==
Ventrone was born in Naples on 14 April 1960. He took part in the 1st San Marco Regiment. During his military service, he took a refresher course in America with the United States Army Special Forces. When Lippi left Juventus in 1999, he remained in Turin.

On the evening of 4 October 2022, Ventrone was taken to the Fatebenefratelli hospital in Naples and put into a coma for mechanical ventilation. A few days earlier, he learned he had acute myeloid leukemia. His death occurred at 6:45 on 6 October due to a brain haemorrhage. He was 62, though reported to be 61 in some English sources. His funeral was held three days later in the San Luigi Gonzaga church in Naples. Conte, out of respect for him, did not hold a press conference for the game against Brighton on the day he died. Before the match, the Tottenham players warmed up wearing a shirt that read "Forever in our hearts". During the minute's silence dedicated to him before the match, Conte cried. Harry Kane dedicated his winning goal to him.
