= Tony Paul =

English footballer

Personal information
- Full name: Anthony George Paul
- Date of birth: 6 April 1961 (age 65)
- Place of birth: Islington, England
- Position: Midfielder

Senior career*
Years	Team	Apps	(Gls)
1978–1981	Crystal Palace	1	(0)
1981	Mikkelin Palloilijat	17	(2)
	Croydon	?	(?)
Total		18	(2)

International career
1979	England Youth	2	(0)
- * Club domestic league appearances and goals

Anthony George Paul (born 6 April 1961 in Islington ) is an English former professional footballer who played in the Football League as a midfielder.
