= Dave Wiffill =

English footballer and manager

Personal information
- Full name: David Phillip Wiffill
- Date of birth: 19 April 1961 (age 65)
- Place of birth: Bristol, England
- Position: Midfielder

Senior career*
Years	Team	Apps	(Gls)
- Frome Town
- Bath City
1980–1981	Manchester City	0	(0)
- Happy Valley
1986–1987	Gloucester City	8	(0)
1987–1988	Bristol Rovers	2	(0)
- Bath City
- Stroud
- Thornbury Town
- Bristol City
- Clevedon Town
Total		10+	(0+)

Managerial career
- 2001–2004: Thornbury Town
- * Club domestic league appearances and goals

David Phillip Wiffill (born 19 April 1961) is an English former professional football player and coach.

== Career ==
Wiffill played as a midfielder in England and Hong Kong for Frome Town, Bath City, Manchester City, Happy Valley, Gloucester City, Bristol Rovers, Stroud and Thornbury Town. He also played for Bristol City and Clevedon Town. At Bristol Rovers, Wiffill made two appearances in the Football League during the 1987–88 season. At Gloucester City, he made a total of 8 appearances in the 1986–87 season.

He later became a football manager and was in charge of Thornbury Town for three years before resigning in June 2004.
