= 1987–88 Luton Town F.C. season =

English football club season

Luton Town
1987–88 season
- Chairman: David Evans
- Manager: Ray Harford
- Football League First Division: 9th
- FA Cup: Semi-final
- Football League Cup: Winners
- Full Members' Cup: Runners-up
- Top goalscorer: League: Mark Stein (11); All: Mick Harford (21)
- Highest home attendance: 13,010 vs Oxford United (Football League Cup, 28 February 1988)
- Lowest home attendance: 4,240 vs Wigan Athletic (Football League Cup, 6 October 1987)
- Average home league attendance: 8,039
Home colours	Away colours

The 1987–88 season was the 103rd season in the history of Luton Town Football Club. It was Luton Town's 68th consecutive season in the Football League, and their 71st overall. It was also their sixth successive season in the First Division, and their 12th overall. The season is one of the club's most successful of all time, as Luton Town achieved a ninth-place finish in the league, won the Football League Cup, and reached the FA Cup semi-final and Full Members' Cup final. As League Cup winners, they would normally have qualified for the UEFA Cup, but were denied a first foray into European competition due to the ban on English clubs as a result of the 1985 Heysel disaster continuing for a fourth season.

== Background ==
1982–83 saw Luton Town back in the First Division under David Pleat, making a final day escape from relegation at Maine Road through Raddy Antić. By 1985–86 Pleat had ensured that Luton had climbed to a ninth-place finish, but at the end of the season Pleat left to take up the reins at Tottenham Hotspur. Youth team manager and former player John Moore was promoted to manager, and former Fulham boss Ray Harford was brought in as his assistant. Due to the club's infamous ban on visiting supporters, 1986–87 saw Luton excluded from the Football League Cup. However, it proved to be Luton Town's best yet, as Moore and Harford took the club to their highest ever league finish; seventh. When Moore resigned after only one season, Harford was promoted to manager for the 1987–88 campaign.

== Review ==
=== July–September ===
The promotion of Ray Harford to manager ensured a sense of continuity was maintained at Kenilworth Road, as Harford had been assistant to John Moore the previous season. Danny Wilson arrived from Brighton & Hove Albion during July in a £150,000 deal, as the club looked to build on their seventh-place finish the year before.

Luton made a dismal start to the First Division season, not winning their first game of the campaign until the sixth time of asking with a 5–2 victory over Oxford United at the Manor Ground. A second victory followed the next week, as Luton beat Everton 2–1. Meanwhile, Harford continued to dabble in the transfer market – Scottish winger Mickey Weir arrived from Hibernian for £230,000, while Robert Wilson and Stacey North were sold to Fulham and West Bromwich Albion respectively. Days after the Weir transfer, Mike Newell was sold to Leicester City - perhaps a surprising move as Newell had been Luton's top scorer the previous season and even scored a hat-trick against defending double winners Liverpool. Two league defeats followed, at Charlton Athletic and Queens Park Rangers – but in between there was a winning start in the League Cup as Luton beat Wigan Athletic 1–0 at Springfield Park, courtesy of a goal from new signing Weir.

=== October–December ===
A Mick Harford goal was enough to secure a 1–1 draw against Manchester United at Kenilworth Road, and Harford bagged a hat-trick three days later as Luton trounced Wigan 4–2 in the second leg of the League Cup fixture. Harford scored a penalty at Fratton Park on the 10th, but it wasn't enough to prevent a 3–1 victory for Portsmouth. Ian Allinson signed from Stoke City for £10,000, and made his debut a week later as Luton beat Wimbledon 2–0.

The impact of a 1–0 home defeat to Liverpool was softened by subsequent success in the League Cup, as Coventry were routed 3–1 at Leicester City's Filbert Street. Three comfortable league victories followed, Luton keeping a clean sheet in every one, and the League Cup run continued with a 1–0 win at Ipswich. Defeat at Norwich City was followed by the derby match at Watford – Steve Foster's goal gave Luton a 1–0 victory. A draw and a loss followed, before Luton rounded off the calendar year with a 1–0 home win over Charlton.

=== January–March ===
New Year's Day saw a 3–0 home win over Chelsea – indeed, Luton went through the month unbeaten. The start of the club's FA Cup run saw victory at Hartlepool, while a draw and a victory in the league kept Luton comfortably in mid-table. The League Cup success continued, as Bradford City were beaten 2–0 at Kenilworth Road.

Oxford United then visited Kenilworth Road for one of the more remarkable fixtures of the year – Luton beat Oxford 7–4, as Mark Stein scored a hat-trick. Luton travelled to Oxford four days later for the League Cup semi-final first leg, and came out of the match with a 1–1 draw. Arsenal beat Luton 2–1 at Highbury, before Mickey Weir, who had just signed from Hibernian months before, returned to Hibernian on the 14th in a £200,000 move.

Luton achieved victory over Everton in the Full Members' Cup, and it then took a replay to knock Queens Park Rangers out of the FA Cup. The second leg in the League Cup against Oxford saw Luton run out 2–0 victors, with a place in the final against Arsenal as their prize.

No English league team had yet won more than one domestic cup competition in the same season, but Luton were now in serious contention to win three domestic cups in the same season.

March saw Luton win two successive matches in the Full Members' Cup, but also lose twice in a row in the league. The end of the month saw the Full Members' Cup final against Second Division Reading – Luton were defeated 4–1 at Wembley Stadium. Consolation was taken from a 4–1 victory over Portsmouth two days later. This left them with two cups to play for.

=== April–June ===
Luton lost the FA Cup semi-final 2–1 to Wimbledon, and Luton only won once in the league during April.

The League Cup Final against Arsenal came on the 24th, and Luton took an early lead through Brian Stein. Luton were overhauled by the opposition during the second half, and trailed 1–2 before a penalty was awarded to Arsenal with ten minutes left. Andy Dibble, a young goalkeeper standing in for the more experienced Les Sealey, saved Nigel Winterburn's shot, and the Luton team rallied to equalise soon after through Danny Wilson. Stein scored the winner with the last kick of the game to bring the first ever piece of major silverware to Luton.

Following the League Cup victory, Luton drew at Norwich before beating Watford 2–1 at home to complete a double over their rivals. Tottenham Hotspur beat Luton 2–1 at White Hart Lane, before Luton finished the season with four consecutive 1–1 draws with Southampton, Liverpool and Nottingham Forest (twice). Luton achieved a ninth-place finish, to go with their cup achievements – an FA Cup semi-final place, a League Cup victory, and a Full Members' Cup final.

At the end of the season, long-serving striker Brian Stein left for French club SM Caen on a free transfer, while Emeka Nwajiobi retired due to injury. Defender John Dreyer signed from Oxford United on 27 June for £140,000.

== League table ==
Pos	Team	Pld	W	D	L	GF	GA	GD	Pts	Qualification or relegation
7	Wimbledon (Note: Wimbledon would have qualified as FA Cup winners.)	40	14	15	11	58	47	+11	57	Qualified for the Football League Centenary Trophy and disqualified from the European Cup Winners' Cup
8	Newcastle United	40	14	14	12	55	53	+2	56	Qualified for the Football League Centenary Trophy
9	Luton Town (Note: Luton Town would have qualified as League Cup winners.)	40	14	11	15	57	58	−1	53	Disqualified from the UEFA Cup
10	Coventry City	40	13	14	13	46	53	−7	53	
11	Sheffield Wednesday	40	15	8	17	52	66	−14	53	

Source: World Football
Rules for classification: 1) Points; 2) Goal difference; 3) Goals scored

== Match results ==
Luton Town results given first.

=== Legend ===
Win	Draw	Loss

=== Football League First Division ===
Date	Opponent	Venue	Result	Attendance	Scorers	Notes
15 August 1987	Derby County	Away	0–1	17,204	—	
18 August 1987	Coventry City	Home	0–1	9,380	—	
22 August 1987	West Ham United	Home	2–2	8,073	Harford (2)	
29 August 1987	Chelsea	Away	0–3	16,075	—	
31 August 1987	Arsenal	Home	1–1	8,745	Wilson (pen)	
5 September 1987	Oxford United	Away	5–2	6,804	Breacker, Harford, Hill, Nwajiobi, B. Stein	
12 September 1987	Everton	Home	2–1	8,124	B. Stein 18', Hill 50'	
19 September 1987	Charlton Athletic	Away	0–1	5,002	—	
26 September 1987	Queens Park Rangers	Away	0–2	11,175	—	
3 October 1987	Manchester United	Home	1–1	9,137	Harford 19'	
10 October 1987	Portsmouth	Away	1–3	12,391	Harford (pen)	
17 October 1987	Wimbledon	Home	2–0	7,018	B. Stein, Wilson	
24 October 1987	Liverpool	Home	0–1	11,997	—	
7 November 1987	Newcastle United	Home	4–0	7,638	M. Stein 2', 62', Nwajiobi 75', B. Stein 87'	
14 November 1987	Sheffield Wednesday	Away	2–0	16,960	Allinson, M. Stein	
21 November 1987	Tottenham Hotspur	Home	2–0	10,091	Allinson (2)	
5 December 1987	Norwich City	Home	1–2	7,002	B. Stein	
12 December 1987	Watford	Away	1–0	12,152	Foster	
18 December 1987	Southampton	Home	2–2	6,618	Harford, McDonough	
26 December 1987	Everton	Away	0–2	32,128	—	
28 December 1987	Charlton Athletic	Home	1–0	7,243	Wilson	
1 January 1988	Chelsea	Home	3–0	8,018	M. Stein 12, B. Stein 50', Harford 64'	
2 January 1988	West Ham United	Away	1–1	16,716	M. Stein	
16 January 1988	Derby County	Home	1–0	7,175	McDonough	
6 February 1988	Oxford United	Home	7–4	8,063	Harford (2), McDonough, B.Stein, M.Stein (3)	
13 February 1988	Arsenal	Away	1–2	22,612	M.Stein	
5 March 1988	Wimbledon	Away	0–2	4,854	—	
15 March 1988	Coventry City	Away	0–4	13,711	—	
29 March 1988	Portsmouth	Home	4–1	6,740	B.Stein, M.Stein, Wilson, own goal	
2 April 1988	Newcastle United	Away	0–4	20,752	—	
5 April 1988	Sheffield Wednesday	Home	2–2	7,337	McDonough, B. Stein	
12 April 1988	Manchester United	Away	0–3	28,830	—	
19 April 1988	Queens Park Rangers	Home	2–1	6,735	Foster, Wilson (pen)	
30 April 1988	Norwich City	Away	2–2	13,171	M. Stein, Wilson (pen)	
2 May 1988	Watford	Home	2–1	10,409	Oldfield, Wilson (pen)	
4 May 1988	Tottenham Hotspur	Away	1–2	15,437	Grimes	
7 May 1988	Southampton	Away	1–1	12,722	Wilson	
9 May 1988	Liverpool	Away	1–1	30,374	Oldfield 30'	
13 May 1988	Nottingham Forest	Home	1–1	9,108	Donaghy 5'	
15 May 1988	Nottingham Forest	Away	1–1	13,106	Oldfield 2'	

=== FA Cup ===
Round	Date	Opponent	Venue	Result	Attendance	Goalscorers	Notes
3rd Round	9 January 1988	Hartlepool United	Away	2–1	6,187	Weir, McDonough	
4th Round	30 January 1988	Southampton	Home	2–1	10,009	Allinson, B. Stein	
5th Round	20 February 1988	Queens Park Rangers	Away	1–1	15,856	Harford	
5th Round (replay)	24 February 1988	Queens Park Rangers	Home	1–0	10,854	own goal	
6th Round	12 March 1988	Portsmouth	Home	3–1	12,857	Wilson, M. Stein, Harford	
Semi-final	9 April 1988	Wimbledon	Neutral	1–2	25,963	Harford	^{[A]}

=== Football League Cup ===
Round	Date	Opponent	Venue	Result	Attendance	Goalscorers	Notes
2nd Round; 1st Leg	22 September 1987	Wigan Athletic	Away	1–0	5,018	Weir	
2nd Round; 2nd Leg	6 October 1987	Wigan Athletic	Home	4–2	4,240	Harford (3), McDonough	
3rd Round	27 October 1987	Coventry City	Neutral	3–1	8,113	Harford (2), Weir	^{[B]}
4th Round	17 November 1987	Ipswich Town	Away	1–0	15,643	B. Stein	
5th Round	19 January 1988	Bradford City	Home	2–0	11,022	Foster, Harford	
Semi-final; 1st Leg	10 February 1988	Oxford United	Away	1–1	12,943	B. Stein	
Semi-final; 2nd Leg	28 February 1988	Oxford United	Home	2–0	13,010	B. Stein, Grimes	
Final	24 April 1988	Arsenal	Neutral	3–2	95,732	B. Stein (2), Wilson	^{[C]}

=== Full Members' Cup ===
Round	Date	Opponent	Venue	Result	Attendance	Goalscorers	Notes
3rd Round	16 February 1988	Everton	Away	2–1	5,204	Oldfield (2) 61', 83'	
Quarter-final	1 March 1988	Stoke City	Home	4–1	4,580	Harford (2), B. Stein (2)	
Semi-final	8 March 1988	Swindon Town	Home	2–1	10,027	B. Stein, M. Stein	^{[D]}
Final	27 March 1988	Reading	Neutral	1–4	61,740	Harford 13'	^{[C]}

== Player details ==
Players arranged in order of starts (in all competitions), with the greater number of substitute appearances taking precedence in case of an equal number of started matches.

Pos.	Name	League		FA Cup		League Cup		FM Cup		Total	
Pos.	Name	Apps	Goals	Apps	Goals	Apps	Goals	Apps	Goals	Apps	Goals
DF	(England) Tim Breacker	40	1	6	0	8	0	2 (2)	0	56 (2)	1
DF	(England) Steve Foster	39	2	6	0	8	1	2	0	55	3
MF	(England) Danny Wilson	38	8	6	1	8	1	2	0	54	10
DF	(Northern Ireland) Mal Donaghy	32	1	6	0	8	0	3	0	49	1
GK	(England) Les Sealey	31	0	5	0	7	0	3	0	46	0
FW	(England) Brian Stein	28	9	5	1	8	5	3	3	44	18
DF	(Republic of Ireland) Ashley Grimes	31 (1)	1	4 (1)	0	3 (2)	1	3	0	41 (4)	2
FW	(England) Mick Harford	24 (1)	9	5	3	7	6	3	3	39 (1)	21
MF	(England) Darron McDonough	24 (3)	4	6	1	6	1	2	0	38 (3)	6
DF	(England) Rob Johnson	21 (4)	0	4	0	7	0	2 (1)	0	34 (5)	0
FW	(England) Mark Stein	20 (5)	11	6	1	4 (1)	0	3	1	33 (6)	13
MF	(England) Ian Allinson	23 (4)	3	5	1	0	0	4	0	32 (4)	4
MF	(England) Ricky Hill	16 (1)	2	0	0	2	0	0	0	20 (1)	2
MF	(Northern Ireland) Kingsley Black	10 (3)	0	0 (1)	0	3 (1)	0	4	0	17 (5)	0
MF	(England) David Preece	13	0	0	0	2	0	0	0	15	0
GK	(Wales) Andy Dibble	9	0	1	0	1	0	1	0	12	0
FW	(Nigeria) Emeka Nwajiobi	10 (2)	2	0	0	1 (1)	0	0	0	11 (3)	2
MF	(Scotland) Mickey Weir	7 (1)	0	1	1	3	2	0	0	11 (1)	3
DF	(England) Marvin Johnson	7 (2)	0	0	0	0	0	2	0	9 (2)	0
MF	(England) David Oldfield	6 (2)	3	0	0	1 (1)	0	1 (1)	2	8 (4)	5
MF	(England) Gary Cobb	4 (3)	0	0	0	0	0	1	0	5 (3)	0
FW	(England) Mike Newell	4 (1)	0	0	0	0	0	0	0	4 (1)	0
MF	(Republic of Ireland) Robert Wilson	3	0	0	0	0	0	0	0	3	0
DF	(England) Richard Harvey	0	0	0	0	1	0	1 (1)	0	2 (1)	0
MF	(Republic of Ireland) Ricky McEvoy	0	0	0	0	0	0	1	0	1	0
MF	(Northern Ireland) Paul Gray	0	0	0	0	0	0	1	0	1	0
DF	(England) Julian James	0 (3)	0	0	0	0	0	0	0	0 (3)	0
DF	(England) Stacey North	0 (1)	0	0	0	0	0	0	0	0 (1)	0
—	own goal	—	1	—	1	—	0	—	0	—	2

== Transfers ==
=== In ===
Date	Player	From	Fee	Notes
16 July 1987	(Northern Ireland) Danny Wilson	Brighton & Hove Albion	£150,000	
11 September 1987	(Scotland) Mickey Weir	(Scotland) Hibernian	£230,000	^{[E]}
October 1987	(England) Ian Allinson	Stoke City	£10,000	
27 June 1988	(England) John Dreyer	Oxford United	£140,000	

=== Out ===
Date	Player	To	Fee	Notes
September 1987	(Republic of Ireland) Robert Wilson	Fulham		
16 September 1987	(England) Mike Newell	Leicester City	£350,000	
5 November 1987	(Wales) Mark Walton	Colchester United	£15,000	
December 1987	(England) Stacey North	West Bromwich Albion	£100,000	
14 January 1988	(Scotland) Mickey Weir	(Scotland) Hibernian	£200,000	
31 May 1988	(England) Brian Stein	(France) SM Caen	Free	
31 May 1988	(Nigeria) Emeka Nwajiobi	Retired		

=== Loans out ===
Date	Player	To	End date	Notes
1 March 1988	(England) Sean Farrell	Colchester United	16 May 1988	

== See also ==
- 1987–88 in English football

== Footnotes ==
A. The FA Cup semi-final against Wimbledon on 9 April 1988 was played at White Hart Lane, home of Tottenham Hotspur.
B. The Football League Cup Third Round match against Coventry City on 27 October 1987 was drawn as a home game for Luton, but was played at Filbert Street, home of Leicester City.
C. The Full Members' Cup and Football League Cup Finals, played on 27 March and 24 April 1988 respectively, were both played at Wembley Stadium.
D. The Full Members' Cup semi-final match against Swindon Town on 8 March 1988 was drawn at 1–1 after 90 minutes, and finished 2–1 after extra time.
E. The £230,000 fee that brought Mickey Weir to Luton Town from Hibernian was set by a tribunal.
