= 1986–87 Luton Town F.C. season =

English football club season

Luton Town F.C.
1986–87 season
- Chairman: David Evans
- Manager: John Moore
- Stadium: Kenilworth Road
- First Division: 7th
- FA Cup: Fourth round
- Top goalscorer: League: All: Mike Newell and Brian Stein (13)

During the 1986–87 English football season, Luton Town F.C. competed in the Football League First Division and finished seventh, the best league position in the club's history to date.

== Season summary ==
Manager David Pleat had left Luton at the end of the previous season to become manager of Tottenham Hotspur, and was replaced by former Luton defender John Moore. Under Moore, Luton enjoyed one of the best seasons in their history, finishing in seventh, their highest-ever placing in the top flight. However, Moore resigned at the end of the season, claiming he did not feel management was the right career for him. He was replaced by his assistant manager Ray Harford.

Perhaps the only negative of the season was Luton being banned from competing in the League Cup due to the club's controversial scheme, introduced by chairman David Evans, to only admit club members and refusal to admit away fans.

== Kit ==
Luton retained the kit worn by the club for the previous two seasons, manufactured by German apparel manufacturers Adidas and sponsored by Bedford.

== Squad ==
Note: Flags indicate national team as defined under FIFA eligibility rules; some limited exceptions apply. Players may hold more than one non-FIFA nationality.

Pos.	Nation	Player
GK	ENG	Les Sealey
GK	WAL	Andy Dibble
DF	ENG	Tim Breacker
DF	ENG	Steve Foster
DF	ENG	Marvin Johnson
DF	ENG	Rob Johnson
DF	ENG	Stacey North
DF	NIR	Mal Donaghy
MF	ENG	Kingsley Black
MF	ENG	Gary Cobb
MF	ENG	Ricky Hill

Pos.	Nation	Player
MF	ENG	Darron McDonough
MF	ENG	David Oldfield
MF	ENG	David Preece
MF	ENG	Robert Wilson
MF	IRL	Ashley Grimes
MF	NGA	Emeka Nwajiobi
FW	ENG	Mick Harford
FW	ENG	Mike Newell
FW	ENG	Brian Stein
FW	ENG	Mark Stein

== League table ==
Pos	Team	Pld	W	D	L	GF	GA	GD	Pts
5	Norwich City	42	17	17	8	53	51	+2	68
6	Wimbledon	42	19	9	14	57	50	+7	66
7	Luton Town	42	18	12	12	47	45	+2	66
8	Nottingham Forest	42	18	11	13	64	51	+13	65
9	Watford	42	18	9	15	67	54	+13	63

Source: World Football
Rules for classification: 1) Points; 2) Goal difference; 3) Goals scored

== Player details ==
Players arranged in alphabetical order by surname.

Pos.	Name	League		FA Cup		Total	
Pos.	Name	Apps	Goals	Apps	Goals	Apps	Goals
DF	(England) Tim Breacker	29	1	4	0	33	1
MF	(England) Gary Cobb	2	0	0	0	1	0
GK	(Wales) Andy Dibble	1	0	0	0	1	0
DF	(Northern Ireland) Mal Donaghy	42	0	5	0	47	0
DF	(England) Steve Foster	28	2	5	0	33	2
DF	(Republic of Ireland) Ashley Grimes	31	2	5	0	36	2
FW	(England) Mick Harford	18	4	5	3	23	7
DF	(England) Richard Harvey	5	0	0	0	5	0
MF	(England) Ricky Hill	30	2	5	0	35	2
DF	(England) Rob Johnson	34	0	5	0	39	0
MF	(England) Darron McDonough	10 (7)	1	(1)	0	10 (8)	1
MF	(Republic of Ireland) Ricky McEvoy	(1)	0	0	0	(1)	0
FW	(England) Mike Newell	42	12	5	1	47	13
MF	(Wales) Peter Nicholas	42	1	5	0	47	1
FW	(England) Marc North	2 (3)	0	0	0	2 (3)	0
DF	(England) Stacey North	14	0	0	0	14	0
FW	(Nigeria) Emeka Nwajiobi	6	0	0	0	6	0
MF	(England) David Preece	14	0	1	0	15	0
FW	(England) Brian Stein	38	14	5	1	43	15
FW	(England) Mark Stein	17 (4)	8	0	0	17 (4)	8
GK	(England) Les Sealey	41	0	5	0	46	0
MF	(Republic of Ireland) Robert Wilson	16 (5)	1	0	0	16 (5)	1

== See also ==
- List of Luton Town F.C. seasons
- 1986–87 Football League
- 1986–87 FA Cup
