= 1988–89 Luton Town F.C. season =

English football club season

Luton Town F.C.
1988–89 season
- Chairman: David Evans
- Manager: Ray Harford
- Stadium: Kenilworth Road
- First Division: 16th
- FA Cup: Third round
- Football League Cup: Runners-up
- Full Members' Cup: Third round
- Top goalscorer: League: All: Roy Wegerle and Danny Wilson (12)

During the 1988–89 English football season, Luton Town F.C. competed in the Football League First Division, in which they finished 16th to secure an eighth successive season at this level. They were holders of the League Cup for this season and maintained their defence of the trophy to the final, where they were beaten by Nottingham Forest.

Despite being League Cup holders, Luton did not compete in the UEFA Cup this season due to the continuation of the ban on English clubs in European competitions arising from the Heysel disaster of 1985.

== Season summary ==
Luton were unable to build on their top-ten finishes of the two previous seasons and finished the season in 16th, just two points clear of relegation. Luton did manage to reach the League Cup final for the second season running, but were unable to defend the cup as they were beaten 3–1 by Nottingham Forest. Survival was achieved on the final day of the season with a 1–0 home win over Norwich City; this was the first of three successive seasons where Luton would secure First Division on the final day of the season before finally being relegated in 1992.

== Squad ==
Note: Flags indicate national team as defined under FIFA eligibility rules; some limited exceptions apply. Players may hold more than one non-FIFA nationality.

Pos.	Nation	Player
GK	ENG	Alec Chamberlain
GK	ENG	Les Sealey
DF	ENG	Tim Breacker
DF	ENG	John Dreyer
DF	ENG	Steve Foster
DF	ENG	Steve Williams
DF	ENG	Richard Harvey
DF	ENG	Marvin Johnson
DF	ENG	Rob Johnson
DF	ENG	Julian James
DF	SCO	Dave Beaumont
MF	ENG	Gary Cobb
MF	ENG	Ricky Hill

Pos.	Nation	Player
MF	ENG	Darron McDonough
MF	ENG	David Oldfield
MF	ENG	David Preece
MF	NIR	Kingsley Black
MF	NIR	Danny Wilson
MF	IRL	Ashley Grimes
FW	ENG	Iain Dowie
FW	ENG	Mick Harford
FW	ENG	Sean Farrell
FW	NIR	Paul Gray
FW	RSA	Roy Wegerle

== League table ==
Pos	Team	Pld	W	D	L	GF	GA	GD	Pts	Qualification or relegation
14	Charlton Athletic	38	10	12	16	44	58	−14	42	
15	Sheffield Wednesday	38	10	12	16	34	51	−17	42	
16	Luton Town	38	10	11	17	42	52	−10	41	
17	Aston Villa	38	9	13	16	45	56	−11	40	
18	Middlesbrough (R)	38	9	12	17	44	61	−17	39	Relegation to the Second Division

Source: World Football
Rules for classification: 1) Points; 2) Goal difference; 3) Goals scored
(R) Relegated

== Results ==
Date	Opponent	Venue	Competition	Res	Score
27 Aug 88	Sheffield Wednesday	A	1D	L	0–1
3 Sep 88	Wimbledon	H	1D	D	2–2
10 Sep 88	Southampton	A	1D	L	1–2
17 Sep 88	Manchester United	H	1D	L	0–2
24 Sep 88	Everton	A	1D	W	2–0
27 Sep 88	Burnley	H	LC2 1st	D	1–1
1 Oct 88	Nottingham Forest	A	1D	D	0–0
8 Oct 88	Liverpool	H	1D	W	1–0
11 Oct 88	Burnley	A	LC2 2nd	W	1–0
22 Oct 88	Middlesbrough	A	1D	L	2–1
25 Oct 88	Arsenal	H	1D	D	1–1
29 Oct 88	Queens Park Rangers	H	1D	D	0–0
2 Nov 88	Leeds United	A	LC3	W	2–0
5 Nov 88	Millwall	A	1D	L	1–3
12 Nov 88	Coventry City	A	1D	L	0–1
19 Nov 88	West Ham United	H	1D	W	4–1
26 Nov 88	Norwich City	A	1D	D	2–2
3 Dec 88	Newcastle United	H	1D	D	0–0
10 Dec 88	Derby County	A	1D	W	1–0
17 Dec 88	Aston Villa	H	1D	D	1–1
26 Dec 88	Tottenham Hotspur	A	1D	D	0–0
31 Dec 88	Wimbledon	A	1D	L	0–4
2 Jan 89	Southampton	H	1D	W	6–1
7 Jan 89	Millwall	A	FAC3	L	2–3
10 Jan 89	Crystal Palace	A	FMC3	L	1–4
14 Jan 89	Charlton Athletic	A	1D	L	0–3
18 Jan 89	Southampton	H	LC4	D	1–1
21 Jan 89	Everton	H	1D	W	1–0
25 Jan 89	Southampton	A	LC4 Replay	W	2–1
4 Feb 89	Nottingham Forest	H	1D	L	2–3
12 Feb 89	West Ham United	A	LCSF 1st	W	3–0
18 Feb 89	Middlesbrough	H	1D	W	1–0
25 Feb 89	Arsenal	A	1D	L	0–2
1 Mar 89	West Ham United	H	LCSF 2nd	W	2–0
11 Mar 89	Millwall	H	1D	L	1–2
14 Mar 89	Liverpool	A	1D	L	0–5
18 Mar 89	Sheffield Wednesday	H	1D	L	0–1
21 Mar 89	Queens Park Rangers	A	1D	D	1–1
25 Mar 89	Manchester United	A	1D	L	0–2
28 Mar 89	Tottenham Hotspur	H	1D	L	1–3
1 Apr 89	Aston Villa	A	1D	L	1–2
9 Apr 89	Nottingham Forest	N	LCF	L	1–3
15 Apr 89	Coventry City	H	1D	D	2–2
22 Apr 89	Newcastle United	A	1D	D	0–0
29 Apr 89	Derby County	H	1D	W	3–0
2 May 89	Charlton Athletic	H	1D	W	5–2
6 May 89	West Ham United	A	1D	L	0–1
13 May 89	Norwich City	H	1D	W	1–0

Key: 1D = First Division FAC = FA Cup LC = League Cup FMC = Full Members Cup

== Player details ==
Players arranged in alphabetical order by surname.

Pos.	Name	League		League Cup		FA Cup		Full Members Cup		Total	
Pos.	Name	Apps	Goals	Apps	Goals	Apps	Goals	Apps	Goals	Apps	Goals
MF	(England) Ian Allinson	1 (4)	0	0 (1)	0	0	0	0	0	1 (5)	0
DF	(Scotland) Dave Beaumont	15	0	3	0	0	0	0	0	18	0
MF	(England) Kingsley Black	35 (1)	9	9	0	1	1	0	0	45 (1)	10
DF	(England) Tim Breacker	19 (3)	0	5 (2)	0	1	0	1	0	26 (5)	0
GK	(England) Alec Chamberlain	6	0	0	0	0	0	1	0	7	0
MF	(England) Richard Cooke	0 (6)	0	0	0	0	0	0	0	0 (6)	0
DF	(Northern Ireland) Mal Donaghy	8	0	2	0	0	0	0	0	10	0
FW	(England) Iain Dowie	1 (7)	0	1	0	0	0	1	1	2 (7)	1
DF	(England) John Dreyer	16 (2)	1	5	0	0	0	1	0	22 (2)	1
DF	(England) Steve Foster	36	3	9	0	1	0	0	0	46	3
DF	(Republic of Ireland) Ashley Grimes	12	0	5	0	0	0	0	0	17	0
FW	(England) Mick Harford	33	7	7	4	1	0	1	0	42	11
DF	(England) Richard Harvey	11 (1)	0	1	0	0	0	0	0	12 (1)	0
MF	(England) Ricky Hill	33	3	8 (1)	3	1	0	1	0	43 (1)	6
DF	(England) Julian James	1	0	1	0	(1)	0	1	0	3 (1)	0
DF	(England) Marvin Johnson	16	0	2	0	1	0	1	0	20	0
DF	(England) Rob Johnson	19 (2)	0	3	1	1	0	0	0	23 (2)	1
FW	(England) Raphael Meade	2 (2)	0	0	0	0	0	0	0	2 (2)	0
MF	(England) Darron McDonough	9 (1)	0	(1)	0	0	0	0	0	9 (2)	0
MF	(England) David Oldfield	15 (6)	1	4 (1)	2	(1)	0	1	0	22 (8)	3
MF	(England) David Preece	26	0	6	0	1	0	1	0	34	0
GK	(England) Les Sealey	32	0	9	0	1	0	0	0	42	0
FW	(South Africa) Roy Wegerle	28 (4)	8	7	4	1	0	0 (1)	0	36 (5)	12
DF	(England) Steve Williams	10	0	3	0	0	0	1	0	14	0
MF	(Northern Ireland) Danny Wilson	37	9	9	2	1	1	0	0	47	12

== See also ==
- List of Luton Town F.C. seasons
- 1988–89 Football League
- 1988–89 FA Cup
