= 1984–85 Luton Town F.C. season =

English football club season

Luton Town
1984–85 season
- Chairman: David Evans
- Manager: David Pleat
- Stadium: Kenilworth Road
- Division One: 13th
- Milk Cup: Fourth round
- FA Cup: Semi-finals
- Top goalscorer: League: Mick Harford (15); All: Mick Harford (16)
- Highest home attendance: 18,506 v Watford (FA Cup, 4 March 1985)
- Lowest home attendance: 3,374 v Orient (Milk Cup, 9 October 1984)
- Average home league attendance: 10,816
- Biggest win: 4–0 v Stoke City (A), Division One, 8 April 1985; 4–0 v Leicester City (H), Division One, 11 May 1985
- Biggest defeat: 0–4 v West Bromwich Albion (A), Division One, 1 September 1984

The 1984–85 season was the 99th in the history of Luton Town Football Club and their third consecutively in the First Division. After winning only six of their first 28 matches and languishing in the relegation zone for most of the season, Luton won nine of their final 14 matches to finish in 13th place. They also reached the FA Cup semi-finals and were four minutes from beating holders Everton before conceding an equaliser and losing 2–1 after extra time.

== Millwall riot ==
The FA Cup sixth round tie against Millwall at Kenilworth Road was disrupted by one of English football's worst outbreaks of hooliganism. Visiting fans caused extensive damage to the ground and to cars and properties throughout the town, prompting Luton chairman David Evans to introduce a controversial identity card scheme and ban away supporters from the ground. The Guardian described the events as "a night football died a slow death."

== Squad ==
Players who made one appearance or more for Luton Town F.C. during the 1984-85 season

Pos.	Nat.	Name	League		Milk Cup		FA Cup		Total	
Pos.	Nat.	Name	Apps	Goals	Apps	Goals	Apps	Goals	Apps	Goals
GK	ENG	Andy Dibble	13	0	3	0	0	0	13	0
GK	SCO	Jake Findlay	3	0	1	0	0	0	4	0
GK	ENG	Les Sealey	26	0	0	0	8	0	34	0
DF	ENG	Tim Breacker	34(1)	0	2	0	8	0	44(1)	0
DF	NIR	Mal Donaghy	42	1	4	2	8	2	54	5
DF	ENG	Micky Droy (on loan from Chelsea)	2	0	1	0	0	0	3	0
DF	ENG	Paul Elliott	9	1	3	0	0	0	12	1
DF	ENG	Steve Foster	25	1	0	0	8	1	33	2
DF	IRE	Ashley Grimes	9	0	2	0	0	0	11	0
DF	ENG	Stacey North	7	0	1	0	0	0	8	0
DF	ENG	Mitchell Thomas	35(1)	0	2	0	8	0	45(1)	0
DF	ENG	Colin Todd	2	0	1	0	0	0	3	0
MF	ENG	Ray Daniel	4(3)	1	0	0	5	0	9(3)	1
MF	ENG	Vince Hilaire	5(1)	0	2(1)	0	0	0	7(2)	0
MF	ENG	Ricky Hill	39	2	4	0	8	3	51	5
MF	ENG	David Moss	17(2)	7	2	1	1(1)	0	20(3)	8
MF	WAL	Peter Nicholas	19	0	0	0	0	0	19	0
MF	NGR	Emeka Nwajiobi	21(8)	9	1	0	5(2)	1	27(10)	10
MF	ENG	Garry Parker	13(7)	1	0(3)	1	5(1)	0	18(11)	2
MF	ENG	David Preece	21	2	0	0	0	0	21	2
MF	ENG	Wayne Turner	23(1)	0	4	0	8	1	35(1)	1
FW	ENG	Frankie Bunn	17(3)	5	4	1	0	0	21(3)	6
FW	ENG	Steve Elliott	12	3	3	3	0	0	15	6
FW	ENG	Mick Harford	22	15	0	0	8	1	30	16
FW	ENG	Brian Stein	42	9	4	3	8	2	54	14
FW	ENG	Mark Stein	0(1)	0	0	0	0	0	0(1)	0

== League table ==
Pos	Team	Pld	W	D	L	GF	GA	GD	Pts
11	Watford	42	14	13	15	81	71	+10	55
12	West Bromwich Albion	42	16	7	19	58	62	−4	55
13	Luton Town	42	15	9	18	57	61	−4	54
14	Newcastle United	42	13	13	16	55	70	−15	52
15	Leicester City	42	15	6	21	65	73	−8	51

Source: World Football
Rules for classification: 1) Points; 2) Goal difference; 3) Goals scored

== Results ==
=== First Division ===
25 August 1984 1	Luton Town	2–0	Stoke City	Luton
	S. Elliott 3'; Bunn 65'			Stadium: Kenilworth Road; Attendance: 8,626

28 August 1984 2	Ipswich Town	1–1	Luton Town	London
	Gates 2'		Moss 80'	Stadium: Portman Road; Attendance: 15,331

1 September 1984 3	West Bromwich Albion	4–0	Luton Town	West Bromwich
	Hunt 24'; Regis 41'; Cross 66'; Thompson 71'			Stadium: The Hawthorns; Attendance: 11,720

4 September 1984 4	Luton Town	1–2	Liverpool	Luton
	Donaghy 63'		Neal 47' (pen.); Dalglish 71'	Stadium: Kenilworth Road; Attendance: 14,127

8 September 1984 5	Luton Town	1–1	Southampton	Luton
	Moss 53' (pen.)		Curtis 50'	Stadium: Kenilworth Road; Attendance: 8,657

16 September 1984 6	Nottingham Forest	3–1	Luton Town	West Bridgford
	Hodge 58', 73'; Davenport 71'		Moss 81'	Stadium: City Ground; Attendance: 18,605

22 September 1984 7	Luton Town	0–0	Chelsea	Luton
				Stadium: Kenilworth Road; Attendance: 16,066

29 September 1984 8	Tottenham Hotspur	4–2	Luton Town	London
	Hazard 21'; Perryman 36'; Falco 75'; Roberts 90' (pen.)		Moss 3'; Bunn 27'	Stadium: White Hart Lane; Attendance: 30,204

6 October 1984 9	Queens Park Rangers	2–3	Luton Town	London
	Fillery 26'; Bannister 61'		S. Elliott 17'; P. Elliott 77'; B. Stein 82'	Stadium: Loftus Road; Attendance: 12,051

13 October 1984 10	Luton Town	1–2	Sheffield Wednesday	Luton
	Bunn 78'		Chapman 34'; Lyons 52'	Stadium: Kenilworth Road; Attendance: 10,285

20 October 1984 11	Luton Town	3–2	Watford	Luton
	Bunn 21', 28'; S. Elliott 61'		Reilly 8'; Blissett 27'	Stadium: Kenilworth Road; Attendance: 12,192

27 October 1984 12	Sunderland	3–0	Luton Town	Sunderland
	Chisholm 16'; Wylde 53' (pen.); Pickering 75'			Stadium: Roker Park; Attendance: 15,280

3 November 1984 13	Luton Town	2–2	Newcastle United	Luton
	Parker 26'; B. Stein 87'		Beardsley 14'; Heard 79'	Stadium: Kenilworth Road; Attendance: 10,009

10 November 1984 14	Norwich City	3–0	Luton Town	Norwich
	Mendham 18'; Hartford 26'; Gordon 46'			Stadium: Carrow Road; Attendance: 14,395

17 November 1984 15	Manchester United	2–0	Luton Town	Stretford
	Whiteside 56', 84'			Stadium: Old Trafford; Attendance: 41,630

24 November 1984 16	Luton Town	2–2	West Ham United	Luton
	B. Stein 36'; Nwajiobi 47'		Whitton 9'; Martin 84'	Stadium: Kenilworth Road; Attendance: 10,789

1 December 1984 17	Arsenal	3–1	Luton Town	London
	Allinson 16'; Woodcock 61'; Anderson 67'		B. Stein 74'	Stadium: Highbury; Attendance: 26,366

8 December 1984 18	Luton Town	1–0	Aston Villa	Luton
	Preece 39'			Stadium: Kenilworth Road; Attendance: 7,696

15 December 1984 19	Leicester City	2–2	Luton Town	Leicester
	Lynex 52'; A. Smith 56'		B. Stein 35'; Harford 90'	Stadium: Filbert Street; Attendance: 10,476

18 December 1984 20	Luton Town	1–2	West Bromwich Albion	Luton
	Foster 36'		Thompson 40'; Statham 54' (pen.)	Stadium: Kenilworth Road; Attendance: 7,286

26 December 1984 21	Luton Town	2–0	Coventry City	Luton
	B. Stein 14'; Daniel 86'			Stadium: Kenilworth Road; Attendance: 9,237

29 December 1984 22	Liverpool	1–0	Luton Town	Liverpool
	Wark 26'			Stadium: Anfield; Attendance: 35,403

1 January 1985 23	Everton	2–1	Luton Town	Liverpool
	Steven 11', 69'		Harford 80'	Stadium: Goodison Park; Attendance: 31,682

2 February 1985 24	Luton Town	2–2	Tottenham Hotspur	Luton
	B. Stein 48'; Nwajiobi 87'		Falco 84'; Roberts 89'	Stadium: Kenilworth Road; Attendance: 17,511

23 February 1985 25	Newcastle United	1–0	Luton Town	Newcastle upon Tyne
	Wharton 75'			Stadium: St James' Park; Attendance: 23,737

2 March 1985 26	Luton Town	2–1	Sunderland	Luton
	Harford 21'; Hill 29'		Bennett 51'	Stadium: Kenilworth Road; Attendance: 8,019

16 March 1985 27	Sheffield Wednesday	1–1	Luton Town	Sheffield
	Varadi 6'		Harford 55'	Stadium: Hillsborough; Attendance: 18,856

19 March 1985 28	Watford	3–0	Luton Town	Watford
	Blissett 27' (pen.), 89'; Callaghan 75'			Stadium: Vicarage Road; Attendance: 14,185

23 March 1985 29	Luton Town	2–0	Queens Park Rangers	Luton
	Harford 19', 61'			Stadium: Kenilworth Road; Attendance: 9,373

30 March 1985 30	Luton Town	3–1	Ipswich Town	Luton
	Harford 30', 66'; Nwajiobi 43'		Gates 18'	Stadium: Kenilworth Road; Attendance: 12,640

2 April 1985 31	Southampton	1–0	Luton Town	Southampton
	Wallace 74'			Stadium: The Dell; Attendance: 14,906

8 April 1985 32	Stoke City	0–4	Luton Town	Stoke-on-Trent
			Harford 17', 47'; Moss 64'; Nwajiobi 68'	Stadium: Victoria Ground; Attendance: 6,951

16 April 1985 33	Luton Town	3–1	Norwich City	Luton
	Nwajiobi 53', 89'; Moss 77' (pen.)		Channon 14'	Stadium: Kenilworth Road; Attendance: 8,794

21 April 1985 34	Luton Town	2–1	Manchester United	Luton
	Harford 68' (pen.), 89'		Whiteside 71'	Stadium: Kenilworth Road; Attendance: 10,320

24 April 1985 35	Luton Town	1–2	Nottingham Forest	Luton
	Moss 18' (pen.)		Mills 2'; Hodge 89'	Stadium: Kenilworth Road; Attendance: 10,156

27 April 1985 36	West Ham United	0–0	Luton Town	London
				Stadium: Upton Park; Attendance: 17,303

4 May 1985 37	Luton Town	3–1	Arsenal	Luton
	Harford 2', 49' (pen.); Nwajiobi 14'		Nicholas 52' (pen.)	Stadium: Kenilworth Road; Attendance: 12,251

6 May 1985 38	Aston Villa	0–1	Luton Town	Birmingham
			B. Stein 21'	Stadium: Villa Park; Attendance: 14,130

8 May 1985 39	Chelsea	2–0	Luton Town	London
	Dixon 26'; Nevin 80'			Stadium: Stamford Bridge; Attendance: 13,789

11 May 1985 40	Luton Town	4–0	Leicester City	Luton
	Nwajiobi 14'; Preece 28'; B. Stein 54'; Harford 86'			Stadium: Kenilworth Road; Attendance: 11,802

23 May 1985 41	Coventry City	1–0	Luton Town	Coventry
	Kilcline 83'			Stadium: Highfield Road; Attendance: 14,833

28 May 1985 42	Luton Town	2–0	Everton	Luton
	Nwajiobi 3'; Hill 39'			Stadium: Kenilworth Road; Attendance: 11,509

=== Milk Cup ===
25 September 1984 Second round first leg	Orient	1–4	Luton Town	London
	Cornwell 88'		Donaghy 18'; B. Stein 48', 87'; Parker 72'	Stadium: Brisbane Road; Attendance: 3,080

9 October 1984 Second round second leg	Luton Town	3–1	Orient	Luton
	Bunn 26'; B. Stein 53'; S. Elliott 62'		Silkman 76'	Stadium: Kenilworth Road; Attendance: 3,374

30 October 1984 Third round	Luton Town	3–1	Leicester City	Luton
	Moss 52'; Williams 57' (o.g.); Donaghy 67'		Lineker 89'	Stadium: Kenilworth Road; Attendance: 8,015

20 November 1984 Fourth round	Sheffield Wednesday	4–2	Luton Town	Sheffield
	Blair 15' (pen.), 52' (pen.), 70' (pen.); Marwood 32'		S. Elliott 81', 85'	Stadium: Hillsborough; Attendance: 18,313

=== FA Cup ===
5 January 1985 Third round	Luton Town	1–1	Stoke City	Luton
	Foster 86'		Painter 78'	Stadium: Kenilworth Road; Attendance: 7,270

9 January 1985 Third round replay	Stoke City	2–3	Luton Town	Stoke-on-Trent
	Painter 46' (pen.); Chamberlain 66'		Hill 9'; Harford 12'; Donaghy 62'	Stadium: Victoria Ground; Attendance: 9,917

26 January 1985 Fourth round	Luton Town	2–0	Huddersfield Town	Luton
	Donaghy 34'; B. Stein 56'			Stadium: Kenilworth Road; Attendance: 8,712

4 March 1985 Fifth round	Luton Town	0–0	Watford	Luton
				Stadium: Kenilworth Road; Attendance: 18,506

6 March 1985 Fifth round replay	Watford	2–2 (a.e.t.)	Luton Town	Watford
	Taylor 45'; Terry 51'		Nwajiobi 76'; Hill 80'	Stadium: Vicarage Road; Attendance: 19,867

9 March 1985 Fifth round second replay	Luton Town	1–0	Watford	Luton
	Turner 58'			Stadium: Kenilworth Road; Attendance: 15,586

13 March 1985 Sixth round	Luton Town	1–0	Millwall	Luton
	B. Stein 31'			Stadium: Kenilworth Road; Attendance: 17,470

13 April 1985 Semi-final	Everton	2–1 (a.e.t.)	Luton Town	Birmingham
	Sheedy 86'; Mountfield 115'		Hill 37'	Stadium: Villa Park; Attendance: 45,289
