= 1988 Football League Cup final =

Association football match

- The match programme cover
- Event: 1987–88 Football League Cup
Arsenal	Luton Town
2	3
- Date: 24 April 1988
- Venue: Wembley Stadium, London
- Man of the Match: Andy Dibble (Luton Town)
- Referee: Joe Worrall (Cheshire)
- Attendance: 95,732
- Weather: Sunny

The 1988 Football League Cup final (also known as the Littlewoods Challenge Cup final for sponsorship reasons) was an association football match between Arsenal and Luton Town on 24 April 1988 at Wembley Stadium, London. It was the final match of the 1987–88 staging of the Football League Cup. Luton were making their first League Cup final appearance, while the competition holders Arsenal were appearing in their fourth final.

Each club needed to get past five rounds to reach the showpiece event at Wembley. Both clubs made comfortable progress; Luton scored 14 goals and conceded three, Arsenal on the other hand conceded two fewer. Gus Caesar replaced David O'Leary in Arsenal's starting eleven, as the Irishman was ruled out for the final having damaged his achilles weeks prior. Luton for the final were without Darron McDonough who injured himself in training, but David Preece and Ricky Hill both returned to the side after lengthy periods of treatment. Goalkeeper Les Sealey was not fit in time to play, so Andy Dibble deputised in goal for only his sixth appearance of the season.

Arsenal, the defending champions, entered the match as favourites, but went behind early when Brian Stein scored. Luton's disciplined approach, coupled with a strong performance by Dibble, contained Arsenal to few chances throughout the game. The holders equalised and took the lead in quick succession through Martin Hayes and Alan Smith, but failed to seal the win when Nigel Winterburn missed a penalty. A revitalised Luton staged a late comeback; Caesar's failed clearance led to Danny Wilson equalising, and in the 90th minute, Brian Stein scored the winner after poor defending from Arsenal.

The 1988 final was Luton's first major cup victory; their manager Ray Harford later described it as the greatest win in his time at the club. Luton did not qualify for European football the following season, despite winning the League Cup as UEFA chose not to relax its ban on English teams. Arsenal manager George Graham in the meantime strengthened his squad as a result of his team's poor defensive display. Caesar found his playing time limited in subsequent seasons, as the manager brought in Steve Bould. The 1988 final has been regarded as one of the best in the competition's history and the most exciting at Wembley, and has been likened to the "five-minute" FA Cup final of 1979.

== Route to the final ==
=== Arsenal ===
Round	Opposition	Score
2nd	Doncaster Rovers (a)	3–0
2nd	Doncaster Rovers (h)	1–0
3rd	AFC Bournemouth (h)	3–0
4th	Stoke City (h)	4–0
5th	Sheffield Wednesday (a)	1–0
Semi-final	Everton (a)	1–0
Semi-final	Everton (h)	3–1
Key: (h) = Home venue; (a) = Away venue.

Arsenal entered the competition in the second round, as one of the 22 teams from the Football League First Division. They were drawn against Doncaster Rovers; the first leg was staged at Belle Vue on 23 September 1987. Arsenal eased to a 3–0 win, with goals from Perry Groves, Alan Smith and Steve Williams. A fortnight later, midfielder David Rocastle scored the only goal in the second leg to give Arsenal a 4–0 aggregate scoreline win. AFC Bournemouth were Arsenal's opponents in the third round. The match was played at Highbury on 27 October 1987. Arsenal needed 33 minutes to open the scoring, when Michael Thomas converted a penalty kick. Smith extended their lead and in the second half, Kevin Richardson scored Arsenal's third, profiting from a mix-up between the Bournemouth defenders. The win was Arsenal's tenth in succession at Highbury, setting a new club record in the process.

In the fourth round Arsenal faced Stoke City of the Second Division at home. They made light work of the opposition, winning by three goals and once more set a unique record: David O'Leary's strike meant all 10 regular outfield players each had scored for Arsenal during the season. In his match report for The Times, Stuart Jones assessed: "Having experienced northing but victory since the end of August, Arsenal are walking around with almost too much belief", and felt complacency was the only issue preventing the club from reaching the quarter-finals.

Arsenal profited from a mistake by Sheffield Wednesday goalkeeper Martin Hodge to progress to the semi-finals, where they were paired up against Everton. The first leg was staged at Goodison Park and saw the Arsenal players, rejuvenated by a five-day break in Marbella, come away with a 1–0 win. Groves scored the only goal of the match when he managed to get a shot in from Kenny Sansom's free kick. Arsenal secured a place in the final with a 3–1 victory in the second leg.

=== Luton Town ===
Round	Opposition	Score
2nd	Wigan Athletic (a)	1–0
2nd	Wigan Athletic (h)	4–2
3rd	Coventry City (n)†	3–1
4th	Ipswich Town (a)	1–0
5th	Bradford City (h)	2–0
Semi-final	Oxford United (a)	1–1
Semi-final	Oxford United (h)	2–0
Key: (h) = Home venue; (a) = Away venue. † Luton drawn as home side, but match took place at a neutral venue.

Luton Town, also of the First Division, began the competition in the second round and played Wigan Athletic over two legs. The first, staged at Wigan's Springfield Park ended as a 1–0 win for the visitors, courtesy of Mickey Weir's goal. In the return leg, Mick Harford scored a hat-trick to give Luton a comfortable 4–2 victory (5–2 on aggregate). Coventry City were Luton's opponents in the third round. The tie was played at Filbert Street – a neutral venue – given Luton had banned away supporters from its home, Kenilworth Road as a consequence of the rioting which marred English football in 1985. At Filbert Street, Luton started strongly and took a 30th-minute lead when Weir scored. Further goals from Harford saw them progress into the next round.

In the last 16 of the competition, Luton faced Ipswich Town of the Second Division. Without several senior players because of ineligibility and injury, Luton scored early through Brian Stein's strike, and then produced a solid defensive performance, reliant on goalkeeper Les Sealey to earn a place in the quarter-finals. The result marked Ipswich's first defeat of the season, having earlier recorded 10 wins and two draws at Portman Road. Luton hosted Bradford City in the fifth round of the competition on 19 January 1988. A mistake by Bradford goalkeeper Paul Tomlinson handed Luton the lead four minutes before the hour, when he gave away a free kick for placing the ball down before picking it up again. A shot from Danny Wilson in the 65th minute resulted in Luton's second goal; though his effort was saved by Tomlinson, the goalkeeper could not fend off the advancing Harford's header.

Luton faced Oxford United in the semi-final which was played over two-legs. The first leg was at Oxford's home ground Manor Ground, where Luton had beaten their opponents 5–2 earlier in the league season. On a wet, muddy surface, both clubs struggled to control the tempo, though Luton played the more incisive football and looked threatening in their opponent's half. Brian Stein gave Luton the breakthrough in the tie, but Oxford equalised from the penalty spot. The home side were awarded a second penalty when Dean Saunders was brought down in Luton's area, but Sealey saved his attempt. Having received consent from the police to stage the second leg at Kenilworth Road, a near-capacity crowd saw Luton win 2–0.

== Pre-match ==
Arsenal, the match favourites and holders of the Football League Cup, were making their fourth final appearance in the competition. They had won the League Cup once before, in 1987, and lost two consecutive finals in 1968 and 1969. By contrast Luton Town were making their first League Cup final appearance. The club enjoyed relative success in the cups during the 1987–88 season, reaching the last four of the FA Cup and final of the Full Members Cup. Arsenal and Luton had only played each other once in the League Cup; George Graham the present-day manager of Arsenal, scored the decider in a third-round tie on 6 October 1970. Luton's last victory against Arsenal came in March 1986, a 3–0 win in an FA Cup fifth round, second replay.

Luton manager Ray Harford had doubts over his team selection for the final. Though buoyed by the return of David Preece and Ricky Hill to full training, he was without Darron McDonough who injured his knee ligaments in training. Harford said the instability presented a selection dilemma, telling reporters: "I think I have got to break somebody's heart by telling him he is not playing." He admitted Luton's poor run of form since losing the Full Members Cup was a reason why he would make changes for the Wembley final, and noted his side's difficulty on grass away from home. Harford identified David Rocastle as Arsenal's biggest threat and felt they had few weaknesses in the side other than the ability to finish chances. He believed O'Leary absence through injury was a big loss for Arsenal, and implied that Williams was needed in midfield: "Without him they don't have a leader. He has a presence and that Wembley flair."

Like Harford, Graham had issues selecting his side, going as far to say "it's the hardest line-up I have had to choose." Already without O'Leary, Graham was waiting for Paul Davis to pass a fitness test before finalising his first eleven; the England international had caught a virus a week before the final and subsequently missed training. Arsenal defender Gus Caesar, who deputised for O'Leary, relished the challenge of being up against Harford: "[He] is aggressive, but I'm not worried. I played with Tony Adams for two years in the youth team. We can always draw on that experience. It's instinctive."

The final was broadcast live in the United Kingdom on ITV, presented by Elton Welsby with commentary from Brian Moore and David Pleat. The winners stood to receive £75,000 in prize money, while the losing finalists earned £25,000.

== Match ==
=== Summary ===
Sealey was not fit in time for the final, so Harford selected Andy Dibble to deputise in only his sixth game of the season. Mal Donaghy passed a fitness test and partnered Steve Foster in defence, while Rob Johnson was preferred as left back to Ashley Grimes. Hill and Preece came back into the side in midfield, and Brian Stein played behind Harford and Kingsley Black. As expected for Arsenal, Graham paired Caesar with Adams in central defence, and Davis returned to the first eleven after his short illness. Up front, Smith was positioned alongside Groves. Harford set his team up in a 4–3–3 formation, whereas Graham went for the traditional 4–4–2 system: a four-man defence (comprising two centre backs and left and right full-backs), four midfielders (two in the centre, and one on each wing) and two centre forwards.

Luton kicked off the final, and both sides enjoyed early spells of possession, moving the ball about briskly. Arsenal tested the Luton back four in the eighth minute, when Davis' pass went over Johnson and the ball was collected by Thomas on the right flank. Charging towards the penalty area, he was impeded by the incoming Dibble and moved near the byline, but Johnson obstructed his eventual shot at goal. Minutes later, Luton had their first chance of the match from a long free kick, taken by Tim Breacker. The ball reached the Arsenal penalty area, and goalkeeper John Lukic failed to collect it; Harford got his head to the ball, but it just went over the crossbar. Another Luton free kick, this time in the 13th minute, led to the opening goal. The Arsenal defence failed to clear Preece's incoming delivery, and Foster, thinking quick, managed to slip an angled pass in Brian Stein's direction. The midfielder scored – it was the second goal Arsenal had conceded in the competition.

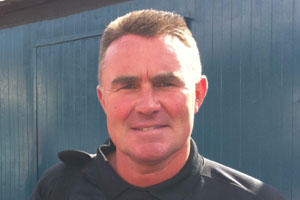
Andy Dibble (pictured in 2010) made a series of saves to deny Arsenal from extending their lead.

Arsenal began to play with purpose once going behind, but for the rest of the half struggled to get the better of Luton's defence. A long ball by Davis sent Rocastle charging forward in the 16th minute, and momentarily upset Luton's shape, but it was caught by Dibble. The Luton goalkeeper was again called into action when Arsenal were awarded a set piece; Sansom slid the ball to Nigel Winterburn, whose shot was gathered. Foster made a timely challenge on Davis on the edge of the penalty area to end another Arsenal attack; Graham's team had been more threatening on right-hand flank with Rocastle and Winterburn. Harford, who had been a long figure up front for Luton, still managed to trouble the Arsenal defence with little service; near the end of the first half, he collected a pass from the left, bypassed his marker Adams and aimed his shot at goal, which went wide of the right-hand post.

Luton came close to scoring their second goal of the match when Harford got away from Caesar and ran towards the left byline. His cross into the penalty area was met by Brian Stein's head, but Lukic made a crucial save, tipping the ball wide. Both managers brought on substitutes after the hour mark – Mark Stein came on for Harford, while Martin Hayes replaced Groves. The latter substitution worked to Arsenal's advantage, as it brought about their equaliser in the 72nd minute. Davis' free kick delivered in was only half cleared by Foster and amongst the scramble, Hayes drove the ball in the net. Arsenal continued to pile on pressure, and took the lead three minutes later, when Smith received a pass from Thomas to score.

The turning point of the match came with ten minutes left. After a period of fluent football by the Arsenal forwards which saw Smith hit the woodwork and Hayes, Thomas and Rocastle all had shots saved by Dibble, Arsenal were awarded a penalty after Rocastle was fouled in the box. Dibble saved Winterburn's spot-kick by turning the ball round the post. A newly inspired Luton equalised with seven minutes remaining when Caesar mis-kicked a clearance on the edge of his penalty area, enabling Luton's Wilson to head the ball into the Arsenal goal from a Mark Stein cross. With less than a minute to go, Adams fouled Mark Stein, and from the resulting free kick, Brian Stein scored his second goal of the match to put the game beyond the reach of the defending champions.

=== Details ===
24 April 1988
14:30 BST

Luton Town	3–2	Arsenal
Stein 13', 90'; Wilson 82'		Hayes 71'; Smith 74'; Winterburn (penalty missed) 80

Wembley, London
Attendance: 95,732
Referee: Joe Worrall (Cheshire)

Luton Town	Arsenal

GK	1	(Wales) Andy Dibble
RB	2	(England) Tim Breacker
LB	3	(England) Rob Johnson
CM	4	(England) Ricky Hill
CB	5	(England) Steve Foster (c)
CB	6	(Northern Ireland) Mal Donaghy
RM	7	(Northern Ireland) Danny Wilson
CF	8	(England) Brian Stein
CF	9	(England) Mick Harford	(substituted off) 60'
CM	10	(England) David Preece	(substituted off) 76'
LM	11	(Northern Ireland) Kingsley Black
Substitutes:
FW	12	(England) Mark Stein	(substituted on) 60'
DF	14	(Republic of Ireland) Ashley Grimes	(substituted on) 76'
Manager:
(England) Ray Harford

GK	1	(England) John Lukic
RB	2	(England) Nigel Winterburn
LB	3	(England) Kenny Sansom
CM	4	(England) Michael Thomas
CB	5	(England) Gus Caesar
CB	6	(England) Tony Adams (c)
RM	7	(England) David Rocastle
CM	8	(England) Paul Davis
CF	9	(England) Alan Smith
CF	10	(England) Perry Groves	(substituted off) 60'
LM	11	(England) Kevin Richardson
Substitutes:
MF	14	(England) Martin Hayes	(substituted on) 60'
CF	12	(Republic of Ireland) Niall Quinn
Manager:
(Scotland) George Graham

Match rules

- 90 minutes.
- 30 minutes of extra-time if necessary.
- Replay if scores still level.
- Two named substitutes.
- Maximum of two substitutions.

== Post-match and legacy ==
Luton's cup win was the club's first major piece of silverware in its history. A jubilant Harford described it as "the greatest win in my time at Luton", having thought his team had lost the match when Smith scored. He commended his goalkeeper, saying: "Considering all the circumstances, I think Dibble had to be the man of the match, and as for the young boy, [Kingsley] Black was sensational. He has so much talent." The stand-in goalkeeper for Luton was delighted with his role in the final, but made it pertinent that he needed regular first-team football, or he would be tempted to leave the following season. Brian Stein spoke of his surprise of scoring the winner, and said: "I asked the referee how long was left and he just blew the whistle." Luton held a civic ceremony two days after the final, where the trophy was presented in front of the club's supporters. It was there the stem of the trophy had become noticeably damaged; Luton the following morning returned it to the competition's sponsors for repairs.

Graham felt his team "... were there when we were leading 2–1", and expressed his sympathy for Winterburn, "He is a good signing for Arsenal and to miss a penalty so close to the end was a great disappointment to him." He extended his congratulations to Luton, in particular Dibble, telling reporters: "Their goalkeeper was absolutely superb. He kept them in the game when they could have been finished." The Arsenal manager also revealed the club would take action against Williams for disappearing on the matchday. The defeat prompted Graham to strengthen his defence over the summer; he was unable to convince his first choice Gary Pallister to join the club, but managed to sign 25-year-old defender Steve Bould from Stoke. Bould went on to displace Caesar in the starting eleven, whose career stalled after the 1988 final.

Although Luton won the League Cup, they did not earn a place in the UEFA Cup, as UEFA chose not to relax its ban on English teams from playing in European club competitions during the late 1980s. David Evans, the Luton chairman was against his club participating in European football, though he never publicised his reasoning.

The match is considered as one of the best League Cup finals, and greatest Cup shocks in the competition's history. In 2015, Luton's victory was ranked 12th in a list of the "50 greatest things from the past three decades", by readers of the Luton on Sunday.
