= Luton Town F.C.–Watford F.C. rivalry =

Club rivalry in English football

Luton Town v Watford
- Other names: Beds–Herts Derby; M1 Derby
- Location: Luton, Bedfordshire and Watford, Hertfordshire
- Teams: Luton Town; Watford
- First meeting: 5 December 1885; Watford 1–0 Luton Town; Friendly
- Latest meeting: 22 February 2025; Watford 2–0 Luton Town; 2024–25 EFL Championship
- Next meeting: TBD

Statistics
- Total meetings: 124
- All-time series: Luton Town: 56; Draw: 29; Watford: 39
- Largest victory: Luton Town 5–0 Watford; 23 January 1926

| Luton Town home colours | Watford home colours |

South-eastern English football clubs Luton Town and Watford have been rivals since their respective formations in the late 19th century. The clubs are respectively from Luton, Bedfordshire, and Watford, Hertfordshire, and for this reason a match between the two teams is sometimes called a "Beds–Herts Derby". Another name occasionally used in the press is "M1 Derby", which comes from the M1 motorway, which passes both towns.

Luton currently play at Kenilworth Road which has a capacity of 12,000. Watford currently play at Vicarage Road, with a capacity of 22,200.

The clubs were both founded during the 1880s, with Watford having been founded in 1881, and Luton Town in 1885. The first recorded game between both teams took place on 5 December 1885, when Watford Rovers beat Luton Town 1–0 in a friendly match at Vicarage Meadow. The two clubs met competitively for the first time in the third round qualifying of the 1898–99 FA Cup on 29 October 1898 at Dunstable Road. This resulted in a 2–2 draw, with Luton winning the replay 1–0 at Cassio Road on 2 November 1898.

In total, there have been 124 meetings between both teams. Luton Town hold the superior record in these matches, with 56 victories to Watford's 39, as well as 29 draws. The most decisive result in a Luton Town – Watford game was Luton Town's 5–0 victory at Kenilworth Road in January 1926. There have been three instances of a 4–0 score, with two won by Watford. In September 1929, Luton beat Watford 4–0 at Vicarage Road. In October 1997, Watford beat Luton 4–0 at Kenilworth Road, and again 25 years later, in October 2022 at Vicarage Road.

Luton Town and Watford played each other regularly in the Southern League and, following the formation of Third Division South in season 1920–21, played every season until 1936–37, when Luton won promotion to Division Two. This, and the Second World War separated the teams from league competition until 1963–64 when they met again, this time in Division Three. The animosity between the clubs, both players and fans, intensified during the late 1960s and the 1970s, and reached a peak during the 1980s, when both teams played in the top-flight First Division. Watford were relegated at the end of the 1987–88 season, while Luton followed four years later. The clubs played against each other regularly for six seasons during the 1990s, in both the second and third tiers of English football. From the 1997–98 season, at the end of which Watford won promotion to the second tier, both teams rarely met, as Watford played in higher divisions than Luton during this time. In the last sixteen seasons there have been only eight league meetings between the two teams, played during the 2005–06, 2020–21, 2022–23 and the 2024–25 seasons. As of the 2025–26 in English football season, Watford currently play in the Championship while Luton Town currently play in EFL League One.

== History ==
=== Origins ===
Luton and Watford are about 16 miles (26 km) apart, just north-west of London in southern England. They are both primary locations on the M1 motorway, which opened in 1959.

The first match between the two clubs can be dated to 5 December 1885, as Watford Rovers hosted Luton Town in a friendly. Watford beat Luton 1–0 at Vicarage Meadow in the inaugural match. The first match at Luton's Dallow Lane was played on 20 March 1886, where Watford won 3–0. Luton's first success in the fixture came at Vicarage Meadow on 16 October of the same year, where they emerged with a 4–1 victory. Two friendlies between Luton Town and West Herts, as Watford Rovers were now more commonly known, took place during the 1891–92 season; West Herts won 4–3 at Luton and the match at West Herts was a draw. Five more friendly matches were played over the next three seasons, all Luton victories.

In the 1930s, a Vauxhall plant was speculated to be built in Watford, however due to the popularity of the Luton Body van at the time it was subsequently decided that the plant would be built in Luton.

=== The Southern League ===
Luton Town did not join a league until the 1894–95 season, where they joined the Southern League. West Herts also joined the Southern League two years later. However, as Luton had left the league the same year, a league meeting did not occur. The first competitive meeting of the two clubs came on 29 October 1898, as Luton drew against Watford in the 1898–99 FA Cup third qualifying round. The second meeting came soon after, as the 2–2 draw at Luton meant that a replay was needed. Luton won the replay 1–0 at Watford. The next season saw Luton draw against Watford again, this time Luton needed only one attempt to beat Watford 3–2.

Luton rejoined the Southern League in 1900, and the fixture then became a regular one in the Southern League calendar except for the 1903–04, 1912–13 and 1913–14 seasons that the clubs spent in different divisions. Luton held the superior record, winning 13 Southern League meetings to Watford's eight. The 1920–21 season saw both clubs made members of the Football League when the Southern League First Division was incorporated as the Football League Third Division.

=== The Football League ===
Matches occurred regularly in this division until 1937, when Luton Town were promoted to the Second Division. A Southern Professional Floodlit Cup meeting during the 1956–57 season was won 4–3 by Luton at Kenilworth Road, and was the only meeting until Luton dropped back to the Third Division for the 1963–64 season. Luton were nearly relegated again, but in the last home game of the season, against Watford, Luton won 2–1 to both ensure survival and deny Watford promotion. Luton were relegated to the Fourth Division a year later, with Watford winning both matches held over a two-day period at Christmas. The game at Kenilworth Road finished 4–2 to Watford, and two days later Watford won 2–0 at Vicarage Road. Luton were not promoted to the Third Division again until the 1967–68 season, thus placing the derby on hold.

=== Growth in prominence ===
The 1968–69 season saw Watford promoted as champions of the Third Division, having led the division for almost the entire season. This led to the crowd violence associated with the fixture growing in prominence, and Watford won the first league clash with Luton that season 1–0 at Vicarage Road. The return match at Kenilworth Road was originally intended to take place on Boxing Day, but was abandoned due to fog with the game tied at 1–1. The game was eventually played after several postponements on 30 April 1969, by which time Watford had already been promoted as champions. The match resulted in Luton winning 2–1, and saw three players sent off, two from Luton, one from Watford. After the game, incidents occurred between fans in St Albans, a town between Luton and Watford, home to fans of both sides. Luton were promoted to the Second Division a year later to keep the fixture going. However, Watford's relegation at the end of the 1971–72 season ended it once more.

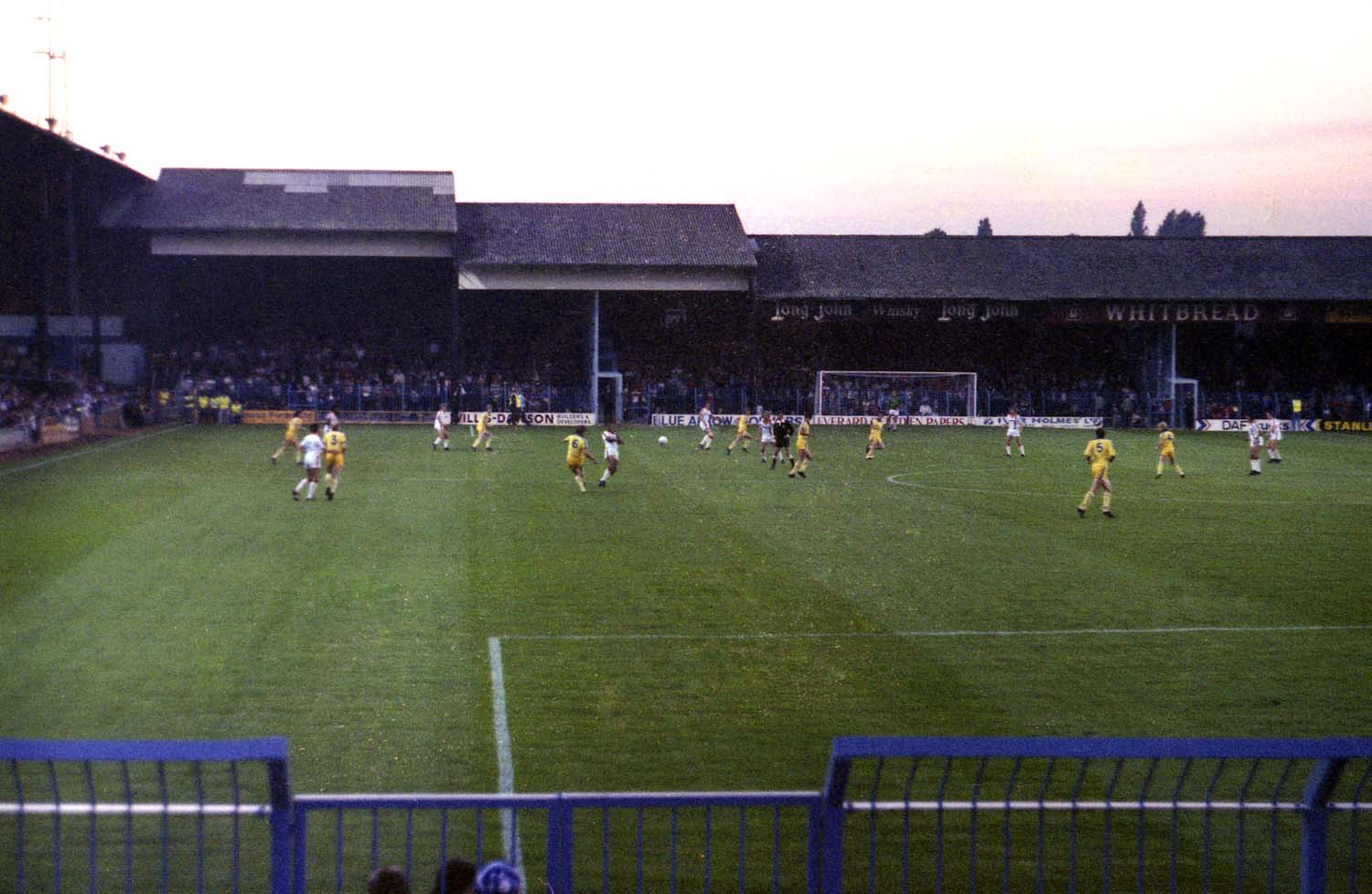
Luton Town's home ground at Kenilworth Road (1980 photograph)

The sides didn't meet again until the 1979–80 season, when Watford were promoted back to the second tier. At the end of the 1981–82 season, Luton won the Second Division, with Watford coming second and both teams were promoted to the First Division. In their first season in the top flight, Watford finished Runners-Up to Champions Liverpool (and so qualified for European football in the UEFA Cup for the following season), beating Luton 5–2 at Vicarage Road along the way. Luton avoided relegation in the last minute of the last match of the season. The match at Kenilworth Road on 28 April 1984 intensified the rivalry even further, as despite Watford's 2–1 victory, captain Wilf Rostron was sent off after a series of goading tackles from Luton players; meaning that he would miss the 1984 FA Cup Final. Despite being favourites on the day, Watford lost 2–0 to Everton. To this day many Watford supporters blame their loss on the absence of Rostron, and therefore on Luton.

The fixture continued until the 1987–88 season when Watford were relegated to the second tier. Luton were further relegated at the end of the 1991–92 season. Both teams were relegated to the third tier at the end of the 1995–96 season. During the 1997–98 season, Watford finished as Champions of the third-tier Second Division and won 4–0 at Kenilworth Road along the way, with all four goals coming within the first 32 minutes of play. The match was marred by yet more crowd trouble as Luton fans tried to prevent Watford fans leaving the ground and small pockets of running battles occurred towards the railway station. As a result, the police took no chances for the return fixture at Vicarage Road: a large police presence ensured no return of the October violence. The game ended in a 1–1 draw. With Watford's promotion to the second tier at the end of that season, the fixture was over once more.

=== The 21st century ===
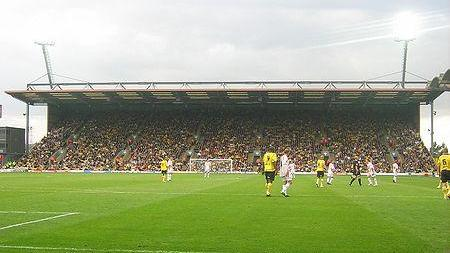
The Rookery Stand at Watford's Vicarage Road ground in 2007

A League Cup meeting at Vicarage Road on 10 September 2002 was marred by hooliganism and saw fighting in Watford town centre, railway station and approaches to the football ground before the match. Before the game, Luton fans invaded the pitch several times leading to the kick-off being delayed by 15 minutes. A minute's silence, intended to mark the first anniversary of the 11 September attacks, was also abandoned. When the match finally got under way, Luton went on to win 2–1. After the game, prosecutions were brought against 29 supporters; 25 from Luton, some of whom were banned from all football grounds for life, and four from Watford.

The two clubs were briefly in the same division when Luton were promoted to the Championship and played each other during the 2005–06 season. Watford won 2–1 at Kenilworth Road on 2 January 2006, and the return fixture was a 1–1 draw at Vicarage Road on 9 April. Watford ended the season with promotion to the Premier League, while Luton finished 10th. Although Watford were relegated back to the Championship at the end of the 2006–07 season, Luton were concurrently relegated back to League One. Luton were further relegated at the end of the 2007–08 season to League Two; and another relegation end of the 2008–09 season saw Luton in the National League, known at the time as the Conference Premier. This was largely due to docked points throughout these seasons as a result of financial mismanagement.

The league rivalry between the two clubs reignited during the 2020–21 season for the first time in 16 seasons as Luton battled to remain in the Championship, and Watford had been relegated from the Premier League. However, fans were not able to attend the matches due to the COVID-19 pandemic. Watford won the first fixture 1–0 at Vicarage Road on 26 September 2020 with a goal from João Pedro (35'). In the reverse fixture at Kenilworth Road on 17 April 2021, Luton won the game 1–0 with a penalty from James Collins (78'). Watford were promoted back to the Premier League at the end of the season, temporarily placing the rivalry on hold.

Watford were relegated from the Premier League at the end of the 2021–22 season, resuming the rivalry for the duration of the 2022–23 Championship season. The first fixture was played at Vicarage Road on 23 October 2022 in front of a crowd of 19,282. It marked the first time supporters of either club had been able to attend the derby in 16 years. Watford won the fixture 4–0 which saw goals from Keinan Davis (3'), William Troost-Ekong (45'), João Pedro (57') and Ismaïla Sarr (79'). Luton's Gabriel Osho performed a late challenge on Ken Sema which saw him get a straight red card (83'). A police presence kept the rival supporters apart, and no arrests were made. The reverse fixture took place at Kenilworth Road on 1 April 2023 and saw a 2–0 Luton win, with goals from Gabe Osho (28') and Allan Campbell (90+1'). Luton were promoted to the Premier League through the Championship play-offs at the end of the 2022–23 season, placing the rivalry on hold.

Ahead of Coldplay's headline performance at BBC Radio 1's Big Weekend at Stockwood Park in Luton on 26 May 2024, locals campaigned to change the song "Yellow" (Watford's colour) to "Orange" (Luton's colour). In the event, Coldplay performed the original lyrics of "Yellow" but also closed the show with "Orange", a tribute to Luton Town F.C. written by Chris Martin the day before.

Following Luton Town's relegation from the Premier League, the derby was resumed for the 2024–25 Championship season. On 19 October 2024, Luton and Watford met again at Kenilworth Road. Luton secured a 3–0 victory over their rivals, with goals from Jordan Clark (11'), Carlton Morris (47'), and a stoppage-time strike by Jacob Brown (90+1'). In the return game at Vicarage Road in February 2025, Watford won 2-0. Honours shared for the season... but the 2024–25 Championship season was to be yet another disastrous one for Luton as they were relegated yet again - becoming only the fourth club in history to be relegated from the top tier of English football to the third tier in successive seasons. All of which meant that for the 2025–26 Championship season, with Luton in League One and Watford still in the Championship, the rivalry was once more put on hold... for the time being at least.

== Statistics ==
Luton Town's league finishes, represented by the orange line, and those of Watford, represented by the yellow and black line, in the Football League.

Up to and including 19 October 2024, when Luton won 3–0 in a league match. There have been 123 competitive first-class meetings between the two teams since the first non-friendly meeting in 1898.

=== Head-to-head record by competition ===
| Match result | Football League | Southern League | FA Cup | League Cup | Others | Total |
|---|---|---|---|---|---|---|
| Luton Town win | 35 | 13 | 5 | 2 | 1 | 56 |
| draw | 19 | 5 | 4 | 0 | 1 | 29 |
| Watford win | 28 | 8 | 2 | 0 | 1 | 39 |

=== Honours and achievements compared ===
| Team | Number of top-flight seasons | Best top-flight finish | FA Cup | Football League Cup | UEFA Cup |
|---|---|---|---|---|---|
| Luton Town | 17 (1955–60, 1974–75, 1982–92, 2023–24) | 7th (1986–87) | Finalists (1) (1958–59) Semi-finalists (4) (1958–59, 1985–86, 1987–88, 1993–94) | Winners (1) (1987–88) Finalists (2) (1988–89) | (Note: Luton qualified for the 1988–89 UEFA Cup by winning the League Cup in 1987–88, but were unable to play because of the penalties inflicted on English clubs after the Heysel Stadium disaster.) |
| Watford | 14 (1982–88, 1999–2000, 2006–07, 2015–20, 2021–22) | 2nd (1982–83) | Finalists (2) (1983–84, 2018–19) Semi-finalists (7) (1969–70, 1983–84, 1986–87, 2002–03, 2006–07, 2015–16, 2018–19) | Semi-finalists (2) (1978–79, 2004–05) | 3rd round (1983–84) |

== All-time results ==
Competitive matches only.

=== Luton Town at home ===
Luton Town result given first.

| Date | Venue | Score | Competition |
|---|---|---|---|
| 29 October 1898 | Dunstable Road | 2–2 | FA Cup |
| 18 November 1899 | Dunstable Road | 3–2 | FA Cup |
| 29 September 1900 | Dunstable Road | 2–0 | Southern League Div. 1 |
| 7 December 1901 | Dunstable Road | 1–0 | Southern League Div. 1 |
| 7 March 1903 | Dunstable Road | 4–1 | Southern League Div. 1 |
| 14 November 1903 | Dunstable Road | 4–1 | FA Cup |
| 14 September 1904 | Dunstable Road | 2–1 | Southern League Div. 1 |
| 26 December 1905 | Kenilworth Road | 2–0 | Southern League Div. 1 |
| 25 December 1906 | Kenilworth Road | 2–0 | Southern League Div. 1 |
| 25 December 1907 | Kenilworth Road | 1–1 | Southern League Div. 1 |
| 26 December 1908 | Kenilworth Road | 1–0 | Southern League Div. 1 |
| 15 September 1909 | Kenilworth Road | 4–2 | Southern League Div. 1 |
| 27 December 1910 | Kenilworth Road | 3–1 | Southern League Div. 1 |
| 25 December 1911 | Kenilworth Road | 1–1 | Southern League Div. 1 |
| 5 April 1915 | Kenilworth Road | 0–2 | Southern League Div. 1 |
| 5 April 1920 | Kenilworth Road | 1–2 | Southern League Div. 1 |
| 28 March 1921 | Kenilworth Road | 1–0 | Third Division South |
| 1 April 1922 | Kenilworth Road | 1–1 | Third Division South |
| 25 November 1922 | Kenilworth Road | 0–1 | Third Division South |
| 3 November 1923 | Kenilworth Road | 0–0 | Third Division South |
| 26 December 1924 | Kenilworth Road | 0–3 | Third Division South |
| 23 January 1926 | Kenilworth Road | 5–0 | Third Division South |
| 19 March 1927 | Kenilworth Road | 2–2 | Third Division South |
| 4 February 1928 | Kenilworth Road | 3–2 | Third Division South |
| 2 March 1929 | Kenilworth Road | 2–2 | Third Division South |
| 18 January 1930 | Kenilworth Road | 2–0 | Third Division South |
| 28 January 1931 | Kenilworth Road | 4–1 | Third Division South |
| 17 October 1931 | Kenilworth Road | 0–1 | Third Division South |
| 26 April 1933 | Kenilworth Road | 3–2 | Third Division South |
| 21 October 1933 | Kenilworth Road | 2–1 | Third Division South |
| 10 November 1934 | Kenilworth Road | 2–2 | Third Division South |
| 29 February 1936 | Kenilworth Road | 2–1 | Third Division South |
| 17 October 1936 | Kenilworth Road | 4–1 | Third Division South |
| 7 November 1956 | Kenilworth Road | 4–3 | SPF Cup^{[A]} |
| 25 April 1964 | Kenilworth Road | 2–1 | Third Division |
| 26 December 1964 | Kenilworth Road | 2–4 | Third Division |
| 14 August 1968 | Kenilworth Road | 3–0 | League Cup |
| 30 April 1969 | Kenilworth Road | 2–1 | Third Division |
| 13 February 1971 | Kenilworth Road | 1–0 | Second Division |
| 4 March 1972 | Kenilworth Road | 0–0 | Second Division |
| 5 April 1980 | Kenilworth Road | 1–0 | Second Division |
| 19 August 1980 | Kenilworth Road | 1–0 | Second Division |
| 26 September 1981 | Kenilworth Road | 4–1 | Second Division |
| 27 December 1982 | Kenilworth Road | 1–0 | First Division |
| 7 January 1984 | Kenilworth Road | 2–2 | FA Cup |
| 28 April 1984 | Kenilworth Road | 1–2 | First Division |
| 20 October 1984 | Kenilworth Road | 3–2 | First Division |
| 4 March 1985 | Kenilworth Road | 0–0 | FA Cup |
| 9 March 1985 | Kenilworth Road | 1–0 | FA Cup |
| 26 April 1986 | Kenilworth Road | 3–2 | First Division |
| 26 December 1986 | Kenilworth Road | 0–2 | First Division |
| 2 May 1988 | Kenilworth Road | 2–1 | First Division |
| 29 November 1992 | Kenilworth Road | 2–0 | First Division |
| 14 August 1993 | Kenilworth Road | 2–1 | First Division |
| 26 March 1995 | Kenilworth Road | 1–1 | First Division |
| 20 April 1996 | Kenilworth Road | 0–0 | First Division |
| 27 January 1997 | Kenilworth Road | 0–0 | Second Division |
| 4 October 1997 | Kenilworth Road | 0–4 | Second Division |
| 2 January 2006 | Kenilworth Road | 1–2 | Championship |
| 17 April 2021 | Kenilworth Road | 1–0 | Championship |
| 1 April 2023 | Kenilworth Road | 2–0 | Championship |
| 19 October 2024 | Kenilworth Road | 3–0 | Championship |

| Luton Town wins | Draws | Watford wins |
|---|---|---|
| 38 | 14 | 10 |

A Southern Professional Floodlit Cup

=== Watford at home ===
Watford result given first.

| Date | Venue | Score | Competition |
|---|---|---|---|
| 2 November 1898 | Market Street | 0–1 | FA Cup |
| 12 January 1901 | Cassio Road | 2–0 | Southern League Div. 1 |
| 16 November 1901 | Cassio Road | 1–2 | FA Cup |
| 22 February 1902 | Cassio Road | 2–0 | Southern League Div. 1 |
| 22 November 1902 | Cassio Road | 0–1 | Southern League Div. 1 |
| 21 April 1905 | Cassio Road | 3–0 | Southern League Div. 1 |
| 13 April 1906 | Cassio Road | 1–1 | Southern League Div. 1 |
| 29 March 1907 | Cassio Road | 2–2 | Southern League Div. 1 |
| 17 April 1908 | Cassio Road | 2–1 | Southern League Div. 1 |
| 9 April 1909 | Cassio Road | 0–3 | Southern League Div. 1 |
| 22 September 1909 | Cassio Road | 1–1 | Southern League Div. 1 |
| 26 December 1910 | Cassio Road | 1–0 | Southern League Div. 1 |
| 26 December 1911 | Cassio Road | 0–1 | Southern League Div. 1 |
| 2 April 1915 | Cassio Road | 2–4 | Southern League Div. 1 |
| 2 April 1920 | Cassio Road | 4–2 | Southern League Div. 1 |
| 25 March 1921 | Cassio Road | 1–0 | Third Division South |
| 8 April 1922 | Cassio Road | 4–1 | Third Division South |
| 18 November 1922 | Vicarage Road | 2–1 | Third Division South |
| 10 November 1923 | Vicarage Road | 0–0 | Third Division South |
| 25 December 1924 | Vicarage Road | 1–1 | Third Division South |
| 12 September 1925 | Vicarage Road | 2–0 | Third Division South |
| 30 October 1926 | Vicarage Road | 2–1 | Third Division South |
| 24 September 1927 | Vicarage Road | 1–0 | Third Division South |
| 20 October 1928 | Vicarage Road | 3–2 | Third Division South |
| 14 September 1929 | Vicarage Road | 0–4 | Third Division South |
| 20 September 1930 | Vicarage Road | 1–0 | Third Division South |
| 13 December 1930 | Vicarage Road | 3–1 | FA Cup |
| 13 April 1932 | Vicarage Road | 3–1 | Third Division South |
| 22 October 1932 | Vicarage Road | 4–1 | Third Division South |
| 3 March 1934 | Vicarage Road | 0–1 | Third Division South |
| 23 March 1935 | Vicarage Road | 2–2 | Third Division South |
| 9 November 1935 | Vicarage Road | 1–3 | Third Division South |
| 20 February 1937 | Vicarage Road | 1–3 | Third Division South |
| 19 October 1963 | Vicarage Road | 2–0 | Third Division |
| 28 December 1964 | Vicarage Road | 2–0 | Third Division |
| 5 October 1968 | Vicarage Road | 1–0 | Third Division |
| 12 December 1970 | Vicarage Road | 0–1 | Second Division |
| 13 November 1971 | Vicarage Road | 2–1 | Second Division |
| 26 December 1979 | Vicarage Road | 0–1 | Second Division |
| 11 November 1980 | Vicarage Road | 0–1 | Second Division |
| 20 February 1982 | Vicarage Road | 1–1 | Second Division |
| 4 April 1983 | Vicarage Road | 5–2 | First Division |
| 26 November 1983 | Vicarage Road | 1–2 | First Division |
| 10 January 1984 | Vicarage Road | 4–3 | FA Cup |
| 6 March 1985 | Vicarage Road | 2–2 | FA Cup |
| 19 March 1985 | Vicarage Road | 3–0 | First Division |
| 23 November 1985 | Vicarage Road | 1–2 | First Division |
| 21 April 1987 | Vicarage Road | 2–0 | First Division |
| 12 December 1987 | Vicarage Road | 0–1 | First Division |
| 15 September 1992 | Vicarage Road | 0–0 | Anglo-Italian Cup |
| 3 April 1993 | Vicarage Road | 0–0 | First Division |
| 31 August 1993 | Vicarage Road | 2–1 | Anglo-Italian Cup |
| 19 December 1993 | Vicarage Road | 2–2 | First Division |
| 17 September 1994 | Vicarage Road | 2–4 | First Division |
| 21 November 1995 | Vicarage Road | 1–1 | First Division |
| 29 October 1996 | Vicarage Road | 1–1 | Second Division |
| 14 February 1998 | Vicarage Road | 1–1 | Second Division |
| 10 September 2002 | Vicarage Road | 1–2 | League Cup |
| 9 April 2006 | Vicarage Road | 1–1 | Championship |
| 26 September 2020 | Vicarage Road | 1–0 | Championship |
| 23 October 2022 | Vicarage Road | 4–0 | Championship |
| 23 February 2025 | Vicarage Road | 2–0 | Championship |

| Luton Town wins | Draws | Watford wins |
|---|---|---|
| 18 | 15 | 29 |

== The Rigby-Taylor Cup ==
The Rigby-Taylor Cup was a competition played between 1953 and 1962 in order to give "the friendly rivalry between Luton Town and Watford an organised and competitive basis". The annual contest came about when floodlights were installed at Watford's Vicarage Road ground in 1953; to mark the occasion, the decision was made to play a match under the new lights against Luton Town, against whom the club had not contested a competitive match since 1937. A home-and-away system was agreed upon, and the first match, billed as the first leg of the "Watford F.C. Invitation Cup", took place on 13 October 1953: a 1–1 draw at Vicarage Road. The competition had been renamed "The Rigby-Taylor Cup" after Watford's chairman, T. Rigby-Taylor, by the time of the second leg on 24 March 1954, at Kenilworth Road; Luton beat Watford 4–1 to win 5–2 on aggregate and thus claim the inaugural title.

After the first season, the two-legged basis was abandoned in favour of a single match at Vicarage Road. The competition was then suspended from 1958 to 1961 due to FA Cup and League engagements. After returning for two seasons, the 1962–63 fixture was abandoned due to harsh weather – the annual match never returned.

=== Results ===
There were seven matches played over the course of six editions of the competition: the first (1953–54) was a two-legged competition, while the remaining five consisted of a single match. Of the seven matches, four were Luton victories, two were wins for Watford and one was a draw. Luton Town won the competition four times to Watford's two; the trophy, a silver, 12 inches (30 cm) tall, two-handled cup, was last won by Watford, who have since retained it.

| Season | Date | Venue | Home | Score | Away |
|---|---|---|---|---|---|
| 1953–54 | 13 October 1953 | Vicarage Road | Watford | 1–1 | Luton Town |
| 1953–54 | 24 March 1954 | Kenilworth Road | Luton Town | 4–1 | Watford |
| 1953–54 | Luton Town win 5–2 on aggregate | | | | |
| 1954–55 | 14 March 1955 | Vicarage Road | Watford | 0–2 | Luton Town |
| 1955–56 | 12 March 1956 | Vicarage Road | Watford | 0–2 | Luton Town |
| 1956–57 | 26 January 1957 | Vicarage Road | Watford | 3–4 | Luton Town |
| 1957–58 | Competition suspended due to fixture congestion | | | | |
| 1958–59 | Competition suspended due to fixture congestion | | | | |
| 1959–60 | Competition suspended due to fixture congestion | | | | |
| 1960–61 | 20 March 1961 | Vicarage Road | Watford | 2–1 | Luton Town |
| 1961–62 | 30 April 1962 | Vicarage Road | Watford | 2–0 | Luton Town |
| 1962–63 | Competition abandoned due to snow | | | | |

=== Goalscorers ===
The competition saw 23 goals scored, 14 for Luton and 9 for Watford; the individual player who scored the most goals was Luton Town's Gordon Turner, who appeared in all seven matches and scored five goals.

==== Luton Town ====
| Name | Goals |
|---|---|
| Gordon Turner | 5 |
| John Groves | 2 |
| George McLeod | 2 |
| Bert Mitchell | 1 |
| Jim Pemberton | 1 |
| Jimmy Adam | 1 |
| George Cummins | 1 |
| own goal | 1 |
| Total | 14 |

==== Watford ====
| Name | Goals |
|---|---|
| Tommy Brown | 1 |
| Tommy Paterson | 1 |
| Tommy Anderson | 1 |
| George Catleugh | 1 |
| Peter Walker | 1 |
| John Meadows | 1 |
| Cliff Holton | 1 |
| Freddie Bunce | 1 |
| Sammy Chung | 1 |
| Total | 9 |

== See also ==
- Luton Town F.C.
- Watford F.C.
