= Gus Caesar =

English footballer

Personal information
- Full name: Gus Cassius Caesar
- Date of birth: 5 March 1966 (age 60)
- Place of birth: Tottenham, London, England
- Height: 6 ft 0 in (1.83 m)
- Position: Defender

Senior career*
| Years | Team | Apps | (Gls) |
| 1984–1991 | Arsenal | 44 | (0) |
| 1990 | → Queens Park Rangers (loan) | 5 | (0) |
| 1991 | Cambridge United | 0 | (0) |
| 1991–1992 | Bristol City | 10 | (0) |
| 1992–1994 | Airdrieonians | 57 | (1) |
| 1994–1996 | Colchester United | 62 | (3) |
| 1996 | Eastern | 1 | (0) |
| 1996 | → Happy Valley (loan) | 5 | (2) |
| 1996–1997 | Golden | 18 | (1) |
| 1997 | Dagenham & Redbridge | 1 | (0) |
| 1997 | Partick Thistle (trial) | 1 | (0) |
| 1997–1999 | Sing Tao | ? | (2) |
| 1999 | Hong Kong Rangers | 0 | (0) |
| 1999–2000 | Kitchee | ? | (0) |
| 2000–2002 | Hong Kong Rangers | ? | (0) |

International career
| 1987 | England Under-21 | 3 | (0) |
- * Club domestic league appearances and goals

Gus Cassius Caesar (born 5 March 1966) is an English former professional footballer.

== Youth and career at Arsenal ==
Born in Tottenham, London, Caesar joined Arsenal in August 1982, turning professional in February 1984. Despite breaking his ankle early on in his career, Caesar showed a lot of promise playing for the Gunners youth side, as a defender who could either play at full back, or more usually in the centre of defence. His Arsenal debut came in a match away to Manchester United at Old Trafford on 21 December 1985, for the suspended Viv Anderson; Arsenal kept a clean sheet and Caesar turned in a strong performance marking United winger Jesper Olsen, as they won 1–0.

Caesar continued as a bit-part player at Arsenal for the next eighteen months, playing mainly as a substitute, coming on in the last few minutes of a match, giving rise to the nickname "the five-minute man". However, he shone enough to be called up for the England U21 side in 1987, winning three caps. When David O'Leary sustained an injury during the 1987–88 season, Caesar became a semi-regular in the side, playing 25 matches that season. However, for all his talent he was a nervy and unconfident player, lacking assurance when one-on-one with an attacker, and prone to making high-profile mistakes.

In the 1988 Football League Cup Final against Luton Town at Wembley, Arsenal were 2–1 up with seven minutes left when Caesar miskicked a clearance from his own penalty area, allowing Luton's Danny Wilson to bundle the ball home in the ensuing chaos; Luton went on to score a last-minute winner and Arsenal lost 3–2. Caesar, who had been selected by George Graham to play in the final largely because David O'Leary was unavailable due to injury, later reflected that he had himself been carrying hernia and ankle injuries at the time, but was determined to play regardless.

After that, Caesar's career at Arsenal was effectively finished. George Graham signed Steve Bould (and later Andy Linighan), and Caesar only played five more matches for the side in two seasons. He was part of the Arsenal side that won the old First Division in 1989 but only played in two matches which was not enough games to earn a medal. He became so unpopular with Arsenal fans that some of them booed him when he did take to the field. Even today, he is still regarded by many as one of the club's worst-ever players, and in 2007 he was voted in at Number 3 in The Times poll of the 50 worst footballers to play in the English top flight. He was also voted the Worst Player Ever to play for Arsenal in the fanzine The Gooner.

Arsenal fan Nick Hornby in his 1992 book Fever Pitch muses on Caesar's downfall, pointing out that Caesar had considerable talent as a youth (or else Arsenal would have never signed him in the first place). Likening it to his own frustrations as a (then) failed writer, Hornby concluded that talent and determination alone were not enough to bring about success:

"To get where he did, Gus Caesar clearly had more talent than nearly everyone of his generation... and it still wasn't quite enough. [...] Gus must have known he was good, just as any pop band who has ever played the Marquee know they are destined for Madison Square Garden and an NME front cover, and just as any writer who has sent off a completed manuscript to Faber and Faber knows that he is two years away from the Booker. You trust that feeling with your life, you feel the strength and determination it gives you coursing through your veins like heroin... and it doesn't mean anything at all."

== Later career ==
Having played 50 matches for Arsenal in five years, Caesar left the Gunners in June 1991 on a free transfer (having previously been on loan to Queens Park Rangers for several months). He then embarked on a journeyman's career mostly in the lower divisions of English football, playing for Cambridge United, Bristol City, Airdrieonians (where he played in the 1992 Scottish Cup Final) and Colchester United.

While at Colchester United in the mid-1990s, Caesar enjoyed something of a renaissance. After a string of poor performances for the club, his form – particularly his reading of the game – improved significantly, and he contributed a run of composed appearances in central defence in the 1994–95 season that won over many fans at Layer Road. He then played at non-league level at Dagenham where he was popular thanks to his "nice bloke" personality.

Caesar finished his career in Hong Kong. Since his retirement as a player in 2001, he has played in several "Football Masters" tournaments in East Asia, alongside many other fellow former professionals. He now splits his time between Hong Kong, where he works in the finance industry, and Essex in his native England.

== Honours ==
Arsenal

- Football League Cup runner-up: 1987–88

Airdrieonians

- Scottish Cup runner-up: 1991–92
