= Ricky McEvoy =

Gibraltarian-born Irish footballer

Personal information
- Full name: Richard Patrick McEvoy
- Date of birth: 6 August 1967 (age 59)
- Place of birth: Gibraltar
- Height: 5 ft 9 in (1.75 m)
- Position: Midfielder

Youth career
- 1977: Belvedere
- 1978–1981: Stella Maris
- 1981–1982: Belvedere

Senior career*
| Years | Team | Apps | (Gls) |
| 1983–1988 | Luton Town | 1 | (0) |
| 1986–1987 | → Cambridge United (loan) | 11 | (1) |
| 1988–1991 | Shamrock Rovers | 69 | (13) |
| 1991 | Finn Harps | 4 | (0) |
| 1991–1993 | Dundalk | 32 | (4) |
| 1993–1995 | Bangor | 77 | (5) |
| 1995–1996 | Glentoran | 3 | (0) |
| 1996–1997 | Home Farm | 10 | (0) |
| 1997–1998 | Bangor | ? | (?) |
| 1998–1999 | Monaghan United | ? | (?) |

International career
| 1985 | Republic of Ireland U19 | 1 | (0) |
- * Club domestic league appearances and goals

Richard Patrick McEvoy (born 6 August 1967) is a Gibraltarian born Irish retired footballer.

== Career ==
A schoolboys international from Patrician College Finglas McEvoy along with Martin Russell helped his school win the Leinster Junior Schools Cup and the All Ireland Colleges Junior title for the first time in 1983. McEvoy scoring in both finals. He was spotted by Luton scout Eddie Cochrane while playing for the national schoolboy team.

McEvoy played for the Republic of Ireland national football team youth team against Iceland in the qualifiers for the 1986 UEFA European Under-18 Championship in November 1985. Future Rovers teammate Wayne Cooney scored in this 2–0 win.

In the 1986–87 Football League season where Luton finished 7th in the Football League First Division McEvoy made one appearance as a substitute against Watford F.C. in the M1 derby on Saint Stephen's Day 1986.

He was then loaned to Football League Fourth Division Cambridge United where he scored one goal in 11 league appearances, which he scored at Turf Moor on 4 April 1987.

The following season he appeared once for Luton in the Full Members Cup at Goodison Park. On the back of his great form he was called up to the Ireland U21 team for the 1989 Toulon Tournament.

Despite an offer of a one-year contract from Coventry City F.C., McEvoy returned home to sign for Shamrock Rovers in August 1988. McEvoy played in Rovers first game at the RDS Arena on 30 September 1990.

In his last game for The Hoops, McEvoy scored from a free kick against Waterford United for the RDS on 30 December 1990. He scored a total of 15 goals in 97 total appearances for The Hoops.

He moved on loan to Finn Harps in February 1991.

McEvoy signed for defending Champions Dundalk in June 1991.

McEvoy scored in a 1991–92 European Cup tie at Budapest Honvéd FC.

For the Lilywhites, McEvoy scored a total of 7 goals.

In October 1992 McEvoy moved to Bangor F.C., during the best season in their history, with Paul Byrne. They won the Irish Cup and the Irish League Cup with McEvoy scoring in the latter final. He made 2 appearances in the UEFA Cup Winners' Cup scoring once against APOEL F.C. for the 1993–94 European Cup Winners' Cup. This goal was the Seasiders' debut goal in European competition.

In July 1996 he returned to the League of Ireland signing for Home Farm and scoring against Norwich City in a pre-season friendly.

McEvoy was a natural two-footed player with superb passing ability, dribbling skills and shooting power but had disciplinary problems and a lack of consistency. During his spell at Rovers he was considered the best midfielder in the League.
