= Rob Johnson (footballer, born 1962) =

English footballer (born 1962)

Personal information
- Full name: Robert Simon Johnson
- Date of birth: 22 February 1962 (age 64)
- Place of birth: Bedford, England
- Height: 5 ft 6 in (1.68 m)
- Position: Defender

Senior career*
Years	Team	Apps	(Gls)
1979–1989	Luton Town	97	(0)
1983	→Lincoln City (loan)	4	(0)
1989–1991	Leicester City	25	(0)
1991–1992	Barnet	2	(0)
- Hitchin Town
- * Club domestic league appearances and goals

Robert Simon Johnson (born 22 February 1962) is an English former footballer, most noted as a player for Luton Town.

== Playing career ==
Johnson signed for local club Luton Town as a 17-year-old in August 1979, but due to two serious knee injuries he didn't make his debut until late on in the 1982–83 season. The start of 1983–84 saw him loaned out to Lincoln City, where he made four appearances before returning to Kenilworth Road. Neither this year nor the next saw him play at all however, and he didn't become a first team player until 1985–86, when he made 15 appearances. He was now a first team regular, and he even appeared in the 1988 League Cup Final, helping Luton to a 3–2 victory over Arsenal. A year later, he moved to Leicester City, where he made 25 appearances in two years before a move to Barnet. He only played twice for Barnet, before a move into non-League with Hitchin Town.

== Post-playing career ==
Johnson is a physiotherapist and has his own practice in Matlock.

== Honours ==
Luton Town

- Football League Cup: 1987–88
- Full Members' Cup runner-up: 1987–88
