= Robert Wilson (footballer, born 1961) =

English footballer

Personal information
- Full name: Robert James Wilson
- Date of birth: 5 June 1961 (age 65)
- Place of birth: London, England
- Height: 5 ft 10 in (1.78 m)
- Position: Midfielder

Senior career*
Years	Team	Apps	(Gls)
1979–1985	Fulham	175	(34)
1985–1986	Millwall	28	(12)
1986–1987	Luton Town	24	(1)
1987–1989	Fulham	47	(4)
1989–1991	Huddersfield Town	57	(8)
1991–1992	Rotherham United	14	(3)
1992–1993	Farnborough Town	?	(?)
- * Club domestic league appearances and goals

Robert James Wilson (born 5 June 1961 in Kensington, Greater London) is a former professional footballer. He played for Fulham, Millwall, Luton Town, Huddersfield Town, Rotherham United and Farnborough Town.

He earned two caps for the Republic of Ireland U21 side.
