= John Moore (footballer, born December 1943) =

Scottish footballer and manager

Personal information
- Full name: John Moore
- Date of birth: 21 December 1943 (age 82)
- Place of birth: Harthill, Scotland
- Height: 5 ft 11 in (1.80 m)
- Position: Defender

Youth career
- North Motherwell Athletic

Senior career*
Years	Team	Apps	(Gls)
1963–1965	Motherwell	3	(0)
1965–1973	Luton Town	274	(13)
1972–1973	→ Brighton & Hove Albion (loan)	5	(0)
1973–1975	Northampton Town	14	(0)

Managerial career
- 1986–1987: Luton Town
- * Club domestic league appearances and goals

John Moore (born 21 December 1943) is a Scottish former professional footballer, best known as a player for English club Luton Town.

== Playing career ==
Moore started his professional career with local club Motherwell, but after only three matches moved south to English Fourth Division team Luton Town. Moore made 274 league appearances for Luton, as the club rose to the Second Division during his time at the club. A loan spell at Brighton & Hove Albion in 1973 prompted his departure to Northampton Town, where he made 14 appearances before retiring from the game.

== Non-playing career ==
Moore rejoined Luton as a coach under David Pleat, and in 1986 he was promoted to manager. During the 1986–87 season, he took Luton Town to a club-best seventh place in the First Division. He resigned after just one season in management because he did not feel that it was the right career for him. Moore returned in 1991 as a coach, and stayed on the club's staff until his 60th birthday in 2003. From 2009, he was first team coach at Bedford Modern School before he went on to retire.
