= Brian Stein =

English footballer (born 1957)

Personal information
- Date of birth: 19 October 1957 (age 69)
- Place of birth: Cape Town, South Africa
- Height: 5 ft 10 in (1.78 m)
- Position: Forward

Youth career
- Edgware Town

Senior career*
Years	Team	Apps	(Gls)
1977–1988	Luton Town	388	(127)
1988–1990	Caen	41	(11)
1990–1991	Annecy	14	(3)
1991–1992	Luton Town	39	(3)
1992–1993	Barnet	40	(8)
1994–1995	St Albans City	42	(32)
Total		564	(184)

International career
1983–1984	England U21	3	(3)
1984	England	1	(0)

Managerial career
- 2007: Luton Town (caretaker)
- * Club domestic league appearances and goals

Brian Stein (born 19 October 1957) is an English former professional footballer who played as a forward.

Stein played in the Football League for Luton Town and Barnet as well as spells in France with Caen and Annecy, before finishing his career in non-league with St Albans City. Born in South Africa, he played for England, being capped once at senior level for the country in 1984.

Following retirement, Stein returned to Luton and was reserve team manager and briefly took over as caretaker manager in 2007, before later becoming assistant to Mike Newell. He followed Newell to Grimsby Town where he initially worked as chief scout before stepping up to assistant manager during the 2009–10 season.

== Club career ==
Stein started his career with Edgware Town before signing for Luton Town in 1977 under manager Harry Haslam, having been scouted by then-reserve team coach and Haslam's successor as Luton boss David Pleat. This was the first of two spells with the club, where he made 427 appearances and scored 130 goals.

Initially a winger, he soon moved into a central striking role where he formed successive prolific partnerships with Bob Hatton and then Steve White as Luton won the Second Division Championship in 1981–82. The following season his striking partner in the top flight was a youngster, Paul Walsh, and Luton produced a flurry of attacking displays in the early weeks of the season, including 5–0 and 5–3 home victories over Brighton and Notts County, and a 4–4 draw away to Stoke City. To cap it all Luton then went to Anfield and surprised the Liverpool fans with Stein scoring twice past Liverpool keeper Bruce Grobbelaar, the game eventually finishing 3–3. Stein missed a substantial part of the season after breaking his foot in December, and by the last game of the season Luton needed to win away at Manchester City to stay in the top division and condemn City themselves to relegation. Stein returned for the game despite lacking match fitness, and played his part with a cross four minutes from time which fell to Raddy Antic to score the winner. The game is primarily remembered for an excited Luton manager, David Pleat, gambolling across the pitch at the final whistle to hug his players.

Strike partner Walsh moved to Liverpool at the end of the 1983–4 season, and Stein then formed an equally strong partnership with Mick Harford. His finest hour came on 24 April 1988 when he scored two goals, including the late winner, in Luton's 3–2 League Cup Final victory against Arsenal.

Stein was released at the end of the 1987–88 season, joining French team Caen. In 1990, he signed for another French team, Annecy. He rejoined Luton for the 1991–92 season, but Luton were relegated at the end of the season, ending a run of ten successive seasons of top flight football. He was a regular player for Luton in the 1991–92 season, but scored just three league goals.

He signed for Barnet in 1992, retiring as a professional player at the end of the 1992–93 season when Barnet were promoted from Division Three despite almost going out of business during the season.

== International career ==
On 29 February 1984, Stein played for England in 2–0 defeat against France in Paris, a game in which he partnered club teammate Paul Walsh. This was to be his only international cap. That same year he helped England win the 1984 UEFA European Under-21 Football Championship. He was the first African-born black player to win a senior England cap and also the first African-born player to win a cap for the England under-21 side.

== Coaching career ==
Stein returned to Luton in 2000 to work as reserve-team coach. With Mick Harford leaving for Nottingham Forest in 2004, Brian was promoted to assistant manager by then Luton manager Mike Newell. On 15 March 2007, after the sacking of Newell, Luton appointed Stein caretaker manager. He only managed Luton for one match, a 2–0 home defeat to Ipswich Town on 17 March, before being replaced by Kevin Blackwell. Blackwell brought in his own backroom staff, and Stein left Luton at the end of the 2006–07 season.

On 17 November 2008, Stein was appointed chief scout and first team coach at Grimsby Town, reuniting him with Mike Newell. He was promoted to the position of assistant manager on 12 May 2009 after it was decided not to renew the contract of current assistant manager Stuart Watkiss.

Newell was sacked in October 2009, however Stein remained in his position as assistant at least for the next five weeks, despite early speculation that he would leave. He was overlooked for the job of caretaker manager, which instead went to youth team manager Neil Woods. When Woods received the job on a permanent basis, Stein was relieved of his duties on 30 November, and was replaced by Chris Casper.

== Personal life ==
He is the older brother of former Luton Town, Chelsea and Stoke City striker Mark Stein; another brother, Ed Stein, played for Barnet. The Stein brothers were born in South Africa, and arrived in the United Kingdom in 1968 when their father Isaiah Stein, an activist with the African National Congress and former boxer, fled the country to escape police persecution and torture for his political activities. Isaiah continued his activism in Britain, serving as a member of the South African Non-Racial Olympic Committee. Anti-apartheid activist Sam Ramsamy, a friend of Isaiah Stein and future president of the post-apartheid South African National Olympic Committee, has credited Brian Stein with encouraging other black footballers in Britain to become involved with the anti-apartheid movement, including Chris Hughton, Garth Crooks and John Fashanu.

== Honours ==
Luton Town

- Football League Second Division: 1981–82
- Football League Cup: 1987–88
- Full Members' Cup runner-up: 1987–88

== See also ==
- List of England international footballers born outside England
