= Mal Donaghy =

Northern Irish footballer

Personal information
- Full name: Malachy Martin Donaghy
- Date of birth: 13 September 1957 (age 69)
- Place of birth: Belfast, Northern Ireland
- Height: 5 ft 9 in (1.75 m)
- Position: Defender

Senior career*
Years	Team	Apps	(Gls)
?-1976	Post Office Social Club		
1976–1977	Cromac Albion		
1977–1978	Larne	20	(0)
1978–1988	Luton Town	408	(16)
1988–1992	Manchester United	89	(0)
1989–1990	→ Luton Town (loan)	5	(0)
1992–1994	Chelsea	68	(3)
Total		590	(19)

International career
1978	Northern Ireland U-21	1	(0)
1980–1994	Northern Ireland	91	(0)
- * Club domestic league appearances and goals

Malachy Martin Donaghy (born 13 September 1957 in Belfast) is a former Northern Ireland international footballer who played for Luton Town and Manchester United.

== Career ==
=== Club career ===
Originally from West Belfast, began his football career as a goalkeeper with little-known Down and Connor League side team St. Agnes', before moving on to play as an outfield player for works team Post Office Social Club.

After barely six months, he was on the move again, this time joining Amateur League side Cromac Albion, where his blossoming talent was spotted by Larne manager Brian Halliday.

Donaghy's rapid rise in the game continued when, after just 20 matches with the Inver Park club, he was transferred to Luton Town in June 1978 for a fee of £20,000.

He spent ten years at Luton Town, overseeing the most successful era of their history to date. He collected a Second Division title winner's medal in 1982, enabling him to experience First Division football for the first time yet. He helped Luton retain their First Division status, and was a key part of the team that finished a club record high of seventh in the 1986–87 season. In 1987–88, he helped Luton win their first major trophy as they achieved a shock 3–2 win over Arsenal in the 1988 Football League Cup Final.

In October 1988, Donaghy departed from Kenilworth Road in a £650,000 move to his boyhood heroes Manchester United. It was at the time a big risk for Alex Ferguson to pay out a large sum of money for a 31-year-old, but Donaghy repaid the United manager's faith in him with some consistent performances in not only his favoured central defensive position but also as a full-back.

Immediately after joining United, Donaghy was the club's first-choice left-back for the 1988–89 season, missing only the League Cup game for which he was cup-tied. However, his opportunities were limited in the 1989–90 season, and he was unable to make even the substitutes bench for the 1990 FA Cup Final triumph over Crystal Palace. Donaghy was an unused substitute for the European Cup Winners' Cup triumph and the League Cup final defeat.

In 1991–92, United were First Division runners-up and won their first-ever League Cup. Donaghy's first-team chances continued to be restricted and he was left out of the squad for the 1992 Football League Cup final.

His next move was in August 1992 when, just a month short of his 35th birthday, Chelsea manager Ian Porterfield paid £100,000 for his services. Donaghy helped Chelsea finish 11th in the inaugural Premier League season and reach the 1994 FA Cup final the following season, but again missed the squad for the final, as Chelsea lost 4–0 to his previous club, double-winners Manchester United. At the end of that season, Donaghy announced his retirement from club football.

Shortly after his playing career ended, Donaghy returned to Northern Ireland with his family and after a brief spell as manager at Newry Town, he had stints as a coach with Cliftonville and as a Youth Development Officer with Donegal Celtic. In 2000, he was appointed as coach for the Northern Ireland under-19 team.

=== International career ===
The first of his 91 caps came in May 1980 at Windsor Park in the 1–0 home international victory over Scotland, a championship team which Northern Ireland won. He further enhanced his reputation during the 1982 and 1986 World Cup finals. In the former tournament, he played in four of Northern Ireland's five games. He was sent off after 60 minutes of the famous 1–0 win over Spain in Valencia, for the offence of shoving José Antonio Camacho, but returned for Northern Ireland's final match, the 4–1 defeat by France in Madrid. He made his final appearance for Northern Ireland against Mexico in Miami in June 1994, three months before his 37th birthday.

== Honours ==
Luton Town

- Football League Cup: 1987–88
- Full Members' Cup runner-up: 1987–88

Manchester United

- FA Charity Shield: 1990
- European Cup Winners Cup: 1990–91
- European Super Cup: 1991

Northern Ireland

- British Home Championship: 1979–80, 1983–84
