= Darron McDonough =

English footballer

Personal information
- Full name: Darron Karl McDonough
- Date of birth: 7 November 1962 (age 63)
- Place of birth: Antwerp, Belgium
- Height: 5 ft 11 in (1.80 m)
- Position: Midfielder

Youth career
- Oldham Athletic

Senior career*
| Years | Team | Apps | (Gls) |
| 1980–1986 | Oldham Athletic | 183 | (14) |
| 1986–1992 | Luton Town | 105 | (5) |
| 1992 | Newcastle United | 3 | (0) |
- * Club domestic league appearances and goals

Darron Karl McDonough (born 7 November 1962) is an English former footballer, most noted as a player for Oldham Athletic and Luton Town.

== Playing career ==
Born in Antwerp but raised in Lancashire, McDonough joined his local side Oldham Athletic from school as an apprentice in 1980. He played in 183 games in six seasons at Boundary Park before signing for Luton Town in an £87,000 transfer deal. He represented the Bedfordshire club 105 times in five seasons. Injuries plagued his time at Luton, and he was sidelined for Luton's famous League Cup victory over Arsenal in 1987–88, though he did appear in the defeat to Nottingham Forest a year later. He was Kevin Keegan's first signing for Newcastle United in 1992, but only three matches into his time on Tyneside a snapped Achilles tendon forced an end to his career.

== Post-retirement ==
McDonough now runs his own joinery business. He lives in Oldham, Greater Manchester, in a house he built himself.

== Honours ==
Luton Town

- Football League Cup runner-up: 1988–89
- Full Members' Cup runner-up: 1987–88
