= Gary Cobb =

English footballer (born 1968)

Personal information
- Full name: Gary Edward Cobb
- Date of birth: 6 August 1968 (age 58)
- Place of birth: Luton, England
- Height: 5 ft 8 in (1.73 m)
- Position: Winger

Senior career*
Years	Team	Apps	(Gls)
1986–1990	Luton Town	9	(0)
1988	→ Northampton Town (loan)	3	(0)
1988	→ Swansea City (loan)	5	(0)
1990–1991	Fulham	38	(0)
- Chesham
- Aylesbury United
- St Albans City
- Chertsey Town
- Bedford Town
- Berkhamsted Town
- * Club domestic league appearances and goals

Gary Edward Cobb (born 6 August 1968 in Luton) is an English former professional footballer.

== Playing career ==
Cobb started out with his home town club Luton Town. After four years at Luton, and loan spells out at Northampton Town and Swansea City, he had only made nine league appearances and was subsequently sold to Fulham. After only a year at Fulham, Cobb left to combine work with the Chelsea Community Scheme with non-League football.
