= Emeka Nwajiobi =

Nigerian footballer

Personal information
- Full name: Chukwuemeka Nwajiobi
- Date of birth: 25 May 1959 (age 67)
- Place of birth: Nibo Awka, Nigeria
- Height: 5 ft 9 in (1.75 m)
- Positions: Winger; attacking midfielder

Senior career*
| Years | Team | Apps | (Gls) |
| 1981–1982 | Barking | 11 | (4) |
| 19??–1983 | Dulwich Hamlet | | |
| 1983–1988 | Luton Town | 72 | (17) |

International career
| | Nigeria | 4 | (0) |
- * Club domestic league appearances and goals

Chukwuemeka "Emeka" Nwajiobi (born 25 May 1959) is a former professional footballer. He had a short footballing career but became a firm favourite with the Luton Town fans in the mid-1980s.

== Career ==
Nwajiobi started out in non-league playing for Barking and then Dulwich Hamlet in the Isthmian League Premier Division. He moved to Luton Town in late 1983, made his debut in 1984 and played until 1988 when a severe injury ended his career. He played in the notorious 1985 Kenilworth Road riot game when spectators from the Millwall enclosure invaded the pitch and damaged the stands prior to the match.

During this period he played four times for the Nigeria national team.

After retirement from football, Nwajiobi pursued a career in pharmacy.

Nwajiobi was followed into football, also at Dulwich Hamlet, by his younger brother Ifeanyi 'Nigel' Nwajiobi.
