= Stacey North =

English footballer

Personal information
- Full name: Stacey Stewart North
- Date of birth: 25 November 1964 (age 61)
- Place of birth: Luton, England
- Height: 6 ft 2 in (1.88 m)
- Position: Defender

Senior career*
Years	Team	Apps	(Gls)
1983–1987	Luton Town	25	(0)
1985	→ Wolverhampton Wanderers (loan)	3	(0)
1987–1990	West Bromwich Albion	98	(0)
1990–1991	Fulham	38	(0)

International career
1982	England U17	1	(0)
- * Club domestic league appearances and goals

Stacey Stewart North (born 25 November 1964 in Luton) is an English former professional footballer best known as a player for West Bromwich Albion.

== Career ==
North joined his home town club Luton Town from school, but due to the solid defensive line-up at the club he was unable to break into the first team. Despite his own strengths, North only made 25 league appearances in four years before moving to West Bromwich Albion for £100,000 – a controversial transfer given that North had spent a short loan spell at Wolverhampton Wanderers only two years before.

Following 98 appearances in three years at the Hawthorns, North moved to Fulham for £130,000. Osteoarthritis forced an early retirement after only a year at Craven Cottage, and North moved to the US and became a coach.
