= Steve Foster =

English footballer

Personal information
- Full name: Stephen Brian Foster
- Date of birth: 24 September 1957 (age 69)
- Place of birth: Portsmouth, England
- Height: 6 ft 0 in (1.83 m)
- Position: Central defender

Youth career
- 1972–1975: Southampton

Senior career*
Years	Team	Apps	(Gls)
1975–1979	Portsmouth	109	(6)
1979–1984	Brighton & Hove Albion	172	(6)
1984	Aston Villa	15	(3)
1984–1989	Luton Town	163	(11)
1989–1992	Oxford United	95	(9)
1992–1996	Brighton & Hove Albion	115	(7)
Total		669	(42)

International career
1980	England U21	1	(0)
1982	England	3	(0)
- * Club domestic league appearances and goals

Stephen Brian Foster (born 24 September 1957) is an English former footballer.

== Football career ==
Born in Portsmouth, Hampshire, Foster was an associate schoolboy with Southampton, but was not offered a professional contract. He started his professional career at Portsmouth in 1973 as a centre forward. After a season, manager Ian St John converted Foster to a centre back and he marked his debut in that position with an own goal against Bury in November 1976. He played for his home town club until 1979 when he joined Brighton & Hove Albion. While at Brighton, Foster won three caps for England, was a member of England's 1982 World Cup squad, and reached the final of the 1983 FA Cup, where they held Manchester United to a 2–2 draw before losing 4–0 in the replay. Foster was suspended for the original game but played in the replay. Despite Brighton's relegation that season, Foster remained at the Goldstone Ground.

After five seasons at Brighton, Foster was sold to Aston Villa in March 1984. However, after only eight largely unsuccessful months at Villa Park, he was transferred to Luton Town in November 1984. At Luton, he became a rock in central defence, and captained the Hatters to the 1988 League Cup.

He left Luton in 1989, and later played for Oxford United, before returning to Brighton, where he spent the last four years of his career. However, Brighton's fortunes during his second spell were quite different to those they experienced during his first spell a decade earlier. He arrived as they had been relegated to the new Division Two (known as the Third Division until the creation of the FA Premier League) and were having to sell many players due to rising debt. By the time of his retirement four years later, they were being relegated again (this time to Division Three) and the financial crisis had got so bad that they were in the process of selling off their stadium.

In January 2008 he was named as a member of an Anglo-American consortium, which includes BBC presenter Nick Owen, bidding to buy his former club Luton Town.

== Honours ==
Brighton & Hove Albion

- FA Cup runner-up: 1982–83

Luton Town

- Football League Cup: 1987–88; runner-up: 1988–89
- Full Members' Cup runner-up: 1987–88
