= Tim Breacker =

English footballer (born 1965)

Personal information
- Full name: Timothy Sean Breacker
- Date of birth: 2 July 1965 (age 61)
- Place of birth: Bicester, England
- Height: 6 ft 0 in (1.83 m)
- Position: Right-back

Senior career*
Years	Team	Apps	(Gls)
1983–1990	Luton Town	210	(3)
1990–1999	West Ham United	240	(8)
1999–2001	Queens Park Rangers	44	(2)
Total		494	(13)

International career
1986	England U21	2	(0)
- * Club domestic league appearances and goals

Timothy Sean Breacker (born 2 July 1965) is an English football coach and former player, who was most recently chief scout at Bolton Wanderers.

As a player, he was a right-back who notably played in the Premier League for West Ham United, where he made 240 appearances, scoring 8 goals in a nine-year spell. He also played in the Football League for both Luton Town and Queens Park Rangers. He was capped twice at England U21 level.

Since retiring, he has moved into coaching and was assistant manager of Leicester City, Plymouth Argyle and Charlton Athletic. He has also worked as a scout for Millwall, Bradford City and Bolton Wanderers.

== Playing career ==
Born in Bicester, England, Breacker started his career as an apprentice at Luton Town. He made 210 appearances for the first team. In 1987-88, he helped Luton win their first — and only to date — major trophy as they achieved a shock 3–2 over Arsenal in the Football League Cup final.

From Luton he was signed by manager Billy Bonds for West Ham United for £600,000. He made his debut on 20 October 1990 in a 1–0 away win against Swindon Town as a substitute for Julian Dicks. He spent nine years at Upton Park, initially competing with Steve Potts for the right-back position. When Potts was moved into the centre of defence, mainly due to injuries to other players, Breacker established himself as first choice right-back for much of the decade, again playing over 200 league games.

Breacker finished his playing career with two seasons at Queens Park Rangers.

== Coaching career ==
On 29 November 2007, Breacker became the assistant manager at Leicester City after following Ian Holloway from Plymouth Argyle. He left Leicester by mutual consent on 1 July 2008 after Nigel Pearson had taken charge at the club.

On 28 July 2009, Breacker was named assistant manager to Phil Parkinson at Charlton Athletic. He was sacked, along with Parkinson, on 4 January 2011. In July 2011, Breacker was named as a scout at Championship side Millwall. Breacker followed Parkinson to Bradford City where he was appointed as chief scout.

In June 2016, Breacker was on the move again, following Parkinson to Bolton Wanderers.

== Honours ==
Luton Town

- Football League Cup: 1987–88; runner-up: 1988–89
- Full Members' Cup runner-up: 1987–88
