= Mick Harford =

English footballer and manager (born 1959)

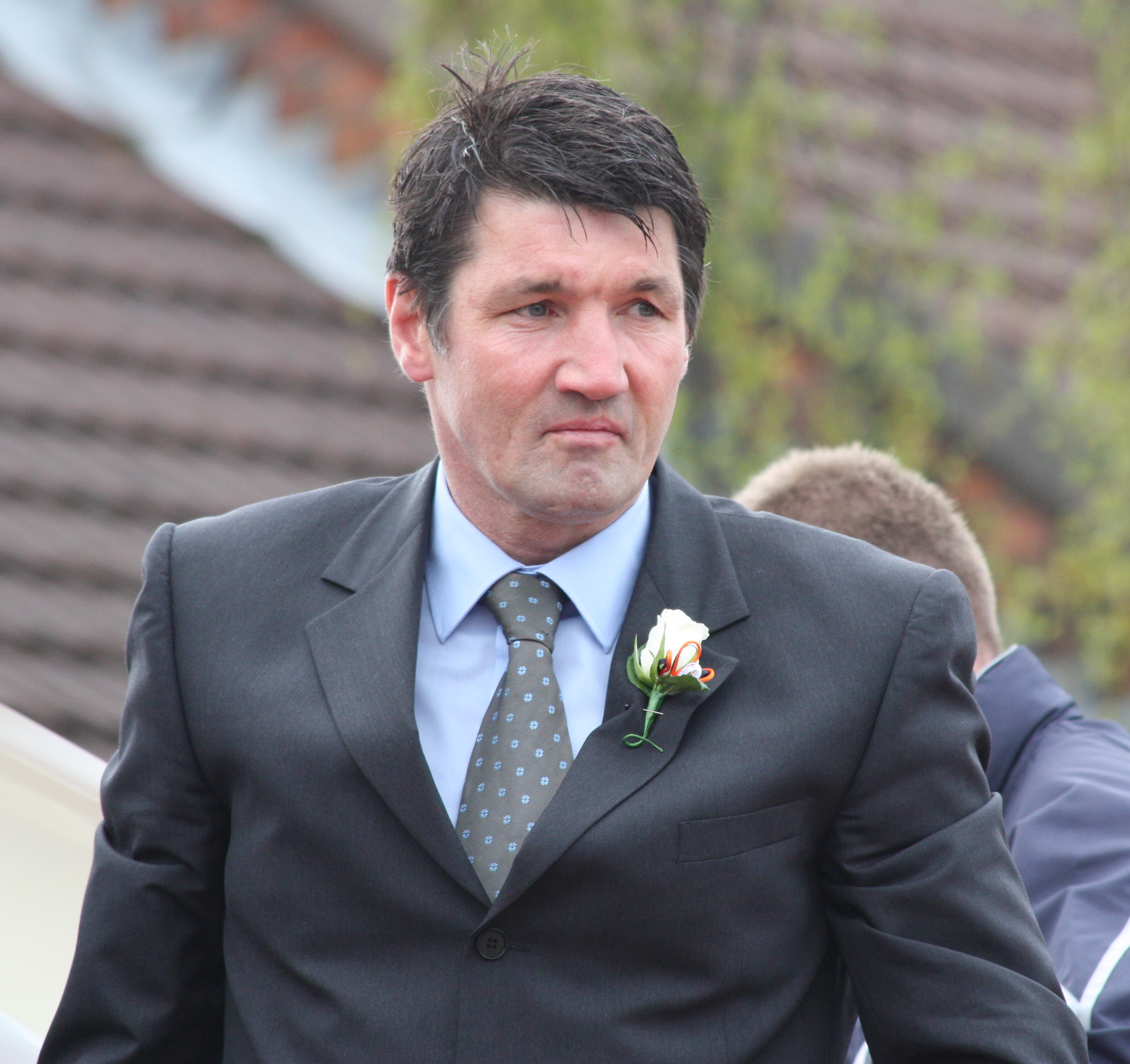
- Harford in 2009

Personal information
- Full name: Michael Gordon Harford
- Date of birth: 12 February 1959 (age 67)
- Place of birth: Sunderland, County Durham, England
- Height: 6 ft 3 in (1.91 m)
- Positions: Striker; midfielder

Team information
- Current team: Luton Town (chief recruitment officer)

Senior career*
Years	Team	Apps	(Gls)
1977–1980	Lincoln City	115	(41)
1980–1981	Newcastle United	19	(4)
1981–1982	Bristol City	30	(11)
1982–1984	Birmingham City	92	(25)
1984–1990	Luton Town	139	(57)
1990–1991	Derby County	58	(15)
1991–1992	Luton Town	29	(12)
1992–1993	Chelsea	28	(9)
1993	Sunderland	11	(2)
1993–1994	Coventry City	1	(1)
1994–1998	Wimbledon	60	(9)
Total		582	(186)

International career
1987	England B	1	(1)
1988	England	2	(0)

Managerial career
- 2004–2005: Nottingham Forest (caretaker)
- 2005: Rotherham United
- 2007: Queens Park Rangers (caretaker)
- 2008–2009: Luton Town
- 2010: Queens Park Rangers (caretaker)
- 2019: Luton Town
- 2022: Luton Town (caretaker)
- * Club domestic league appearances and goals

Michael Gordon Harford (born 12 February 1959) is an English football manager and former professional player. He is the chief recruitment officer at Luton Town, a club where he has spent a large portion of both his playing and non-playing career. In addition to two separate spells as a player at Luton, including as part of the team that won the League Cup in 1988, Harford has been the club's director of football, first-team coach and manager; the latter role saw him lead Luton to victory in the Football League Trophy in 2009 and win League One in a separate spell in 2018–19.

Harford began his career in 1977 with Lincoln City, later moving to Newcastle United and Bristol City. He moved to First Division side Birmingham City in 1982 and thereafter spent 16 seasons playing in the top division of English football for a number of clubs, including Luton, Derby County, Chelsea, hometown club Sunderland, Coventry City and Wimbledon. During his time at Luton, Harford was capped twice by England. In total, Harford's transfer fees over his playing career amounted to over £2.25 million.

As well as his non-playing roles at Luton, Harford was manager of Rotherham United in 2005 and has been caretaker manager of both Nottingham Forest and Queens Park Rangers. He has also held assistant manager positions at Colchester United, MK Dons and Millwall, and coaching roles at Wimbledon and Swindon Town.

== Club career ==
Born in Sunderland, County Durham, Harford joined Lincoln City in 1977. He was at Lincoln for just over three years before he moved on to Newcastle United in a £180,000 transfer. After just 19 appearances and eight months at Newcastle, Harford moved on again, this time to Bristol City for £160,000 in August 1981. Seven months later, Harford had impressed enough to gain a move to First Division club Birmingham City for £100,000 in March 1982.

Harford continued to impress at Birmingham and in December 1984, then Luton Town manager David Pleat added Harford to his side for a £250,000 fee. In his time at Luton, Harford earned himself two England caps, making his international debut against Israel in February 1988. He also featured against Denmark in a September 1988 fixture.

Harford was part of the Luton side that won the League Cup in 1988 against Arsenal. He also scored in the final the following year as Luton went down 3–1 to Nottingham Forest. He is a fan favourite of Luton supporters and is often voted as the club's best ever player, such is the regard he is held in at Kenilworth Road. He was a key player at Luton until his transfer to Derby County in January 1990 for £450,000. Even after his transfer, Harford inadvertently managed to help the Hatters in their fight against relegation, as in the last game of the season Derby County played Luton Town, with Luton needing a win to stay up. Harford managed to head the ball from outside his own six-yard box, past England goalkeeper Peter Shilton, into his own net as Luton won the game and avoided relegation. In 2017 an article claimed that Harford admitted that the own goal was deliberate. However in a direct quote from an interview in 2018, Harford stated the goal was not deliberate. Harford then re-joined the Hatters in September 1991 for £325,000, despite competition from Manchester United. Harford scored 12 goals from 29 league games as the Hatters were relegated from what was about to become the Premier League.

United manager Alex Ferguson has since said that he regretted not signing Harford, as he felt that it would have made a positive difference to their form in the 1991–92 season, when a shortage of goals in the second half of the league campaign cost them the title.

Following Luton's relegation, Harford moved on again, this time to Chelsea for £300,000 in August 1992. During his time at Chelsea, he scored the club's first goal in the Premier League, finding the net in the 84th minute of his debut at home to Oldham Athletic, who swiftly responded with an equaliser to force a 1–1 draw. Despite being the top scorer at the club in the 1992–93 season, he was sold in March 1993 to his hometown club Sunderland in a £250,000 transfer deal.

Harford lasted just four months at Sunderland before moving to Coventry City for £200,000 in July 1993. Despite being at the club for 13 months, Harford only made one league appearance as a fifteenth-minute substitute against Newcastle. He scored the winning goal, but never featured for the club again owing to a back injury. He had been issued with the number 9 shirt with the introduction of squad numbers in the Premier League for the 1993–94 season.

In August 1994, Harford made his last transfer as a player, joining Joe Kinnear's Wimbledon side for £50,000. Harford would go on to make 60 appearances for the Dons, many in midfield, and scored his last professional goal at the age of 38 years and 34 days against West Ham United in 1997, before he retired and moved into a coaching role at Selhurst Park.

== International career ==
Harford made one appearance for the England national B team, in which he scored England's second goal on 14 October 1987 in a 2–0 win over Malta in a friendly. He was capped twice for England at senior level, both of his appearances coming in 1988. His first came on 17 February in a goalless friendly draw with Israel. His second came on 14 September in a 1–0 friendly win over Denmark, but he failed to get onto the scoresheet. He was a Luton Town player at this time.

== Coaching and managerial career ==
Making his move into coaching with Wimbledon, Harford developed his skills before following his old manager Joe Kinnear back to Luton Town following Luton's relegation to Division Three in 2001. In his role as first-team coach, Harford helped mastermind the successful season of 2001–02, which saw Luton storm to promotion back to Division Two. Following the 2002–03 season, the club was sold to a new consortium, and Harford and Kinnear were then surprisingly sacked. Harford was to be offered his job back, but refused to work under the new board.

After the new Luton owners were forced out by supporters, Harford returned to the club in a joint role as Director of Football, with responsibility for player recruitment, as well as first-team coach. Harford helped new manager Mike Newell to a 10th place finish, and his value was proved by then Nottingham Forest manager Joe Kinnear's attempts to make him his assistant manager at Forest. Harford initially rejected the move but in November 2004, despite the contrasting fortunes both sides were displaying – with Forest fighting relegation in the Championship and Luton leading League One – Harford moved onto the City Ground.

Kinnear was to last only a few more weeks at Forest before a poor run of form forced him to leave the club. Harford was then appointed caretaker manager, and he performed admirably despite the problems at the club. Gary Megson was then appointed full-time manager in January 2005 and Harford subsequently left the club.

Out of work for only a short while, Harford teamed up with Andy King at Swindon Town in February 2005 in a deal that was due to run until the end of the 2004–05 season. In April 2005 however, Harford was appointed the new manager of Rotherham United, whose relegation from the Championship at the end of the 2004–05 season had already been confirmed. Harford had an impressive start to his managerial career, but was sacked in December after a run of 17 games without a win. He was replaced by Alan Knill. Harford finished the season at Millwall, coaching the strikers at the club before their relegation from the Championship at the end of the 2005–06 season.

Harford then joined his former Derby County teammate Geraint Williams at Colchester United in the summer of 2006, becoming the club's assistant manager. Harford was linked with another return to Kenilworth Road following the sacking of Mike Newell in March 2007, but the job instead went to Kevin Blackwell. Harford left Colchester to become assistant manager at Queens Park Rangers in June 2007, before becoming caretaker after the departure of John Gregory. Harford left QPR after the appointment of Luigi De Canio.

In January 2008, Harford was unveiled as the new manager of struggling and cash-strapped Luton Town until the end of the season. He committed to stay at Luton despite the club being docked 30 points in the break before the 2008–09 season.

Harford led Luton Town to victory in the Football League Trophy final in a fiercely contested match against Scunthorpe United on 5 April 2009. The tie ended 3–2 after extra time and saw a crowd of 40,000 Luton fans make the short trip down the M1 to Wembley Stadium. However, one week later in the league, the 30-point deduction imposed on the club proved too large an obstacle to overcome, and Harford's Luton succumbed to relegation to the Conference. On 1 October 2009, after a disappointing start to life in the Conference, Harford left Luton by mutual consent.

In December 2009, Harford became assistant manager of QPR for a second time. After the resignation of Paul Hart, Harford stepped up to take charge of first team affairs at QPR. He lasted until 1 March 2010 when he was replaced by Neil Warnock.

On 17 May 2012, Harford was appointed as assistant manager to Karl Robinson at Milton Keynes Dons. He left just over a year later to re-join Millwall as assistant manager. He later became Millwall's head of scouting before being replaced by Terry Bullivant in July 2015.

In January 2016, Harford made a return to Luton Town as chief recruitment officer with responsibility for scouting. Following Luton manager Nathan Jones' departure to Stoke City in January 2019, Harford was appointed as the club's caretaker manager. After five wins in his first six league games in charge, putting the club six points clear at the top of the League One table, Harford's appointment was extended until the end of the 2018–19 season. After guiding Luton to the League One title, Harford was awarded the League One Manager of the Year Award for 2019 by the League Managers Association.

Following Graeme Jones's departure from the club by mutual consent in April 2020, Harford was once again appointed as temporary interim boss at Luton Town but due to the suspension of football due to the COVID-19 pandemic and Nathan Jones' return to the club, Harford did not manage any games.

In July 2021, it was revealed by Luton Town that Harford would be stepping away from duties at the club as he was fighting Prostate cancer and would begin radiotherapy treatment in August. On 7 January 2022, the club announced that Harford would return to the dugout that weekend after completing his course of radiotherapy.

In November 2022, following the departure of Nathan Jones to Southampton, Harford was re-appointed caretaker manager.

== Career statistics ==
Appearances and goals by club, season and competition
Club	Season	League	
Club	Season	Apps	Goals
Lincoln City	1977–78	27	9
Lincoln City	1978–79	31	6
Lincoln City	1979–80	36	16
Lincoln City	1980–81	21	10
Lincoln City	Total	115	55
Newcastle United	1980–81	19	4
Bristol City	1981–82	30	11
Birmingham City	1981–82	12	9
Birmingham City	1982–83	29	6
Birmingham City	1983–84	39	8
Birmingham City	1984–85	12	2
Birmingham City	Total	92	25
Luton Town	1984–85	22	16
Luton Town	1985–86	37	22
Luton Town	1986–87	18	4
Luton Town	1987–88	25	9
Luton Town	1988–89	33	7
Luton Town	1989–90	4	0
Luton Town	Total	139	57
Derby County	1989–90	16	4
Derby County	1990–91	36	8
Derby County	1991–92	6	3
Derby County	Total	58	15
Luton Town	1991–92	29	12
Chelsea	1992–93	28	9
Sunderland	1992–93	11	2
Coventry City	1993–94	1	1
Wimbledon	1994–95	27	6
Wimbledon	1995–96	21	2
Wimbledon	1996–97	12	1
Wimbledon	1997–98	0	0
Wimbledon	Total	60	9
Career total		582	186

== Managerial statistics ==
As of match played 12 November 2022

Managerial record by team and tenure
Team	From	To	Record					Ref.
Team	From	To	G	W	D	L	Win %	Ref.
Nottingham Forest (caretaker)	16 December 2004	1 January 2005	6	2	1	3	33.33	
Rotherham United	7 April 2005	10 December 2005	30	5	9	16	16.67	
Queens Park Rangers (caretaker)	1 October 2007	29 October 2007	5	2	2	1	40.00	
Luton Town	16 January 2008	1 October 2009	91	25	29	37	27.47	
Queens Park Rangers (caretaker)	14 January 2010	1 March 2010	8	1	1	6	12.50	
Luton Town	10 January 2019	7 May 2019	21	12	7	2	57.14	
Luton Town	10 November 2022	17 November 2022	1	0	1	0	0.00	
Career total			162	47	50	65	29.01	—

== Honours ==
=== As a player ===
Luton Town

- Football League Cup: 1987–88; runner-up: 1988–89
- Full Members' Cup runner-up: 1987–88

=== As a manager ===
Luton Town

- EFL League One: 2018–19
- Football League Trophy: 2008–09

Individual

- EFL League One Manager of the Month: March 2019
