= 1987–88 Football League Cup =

League Cup, Littlewoods Challenge Cup

Tournament details
- Country: England; Wales
- Teams: 92

Final positions
- Champions: Luton Town (1st title)
- Runners-up: Arsenal

Tournament statistics
- Goals scored: Brian McClair; Brian Stein (5)

The 1987–88 Football League Cup (known as the Littlewoods Challenge Cup for sponsorship reasons) was the 28th season of the Football League Cup, a knockout competition for England's top 92 football clubs.

The competition began on 17 August 1987, and ended with the final on 24 April 1988. The final was played between Luton Town and holders Arsenal. The match, played at Wembley Stadium in front of 95,732 spectators, was won by Luton Town by 3–2.

== First round ==
=== First leg ===
Home team	Score	Away team	Date
Blackpool	2–0	Chester City	18 August 1987
Bournemouth	1–1	Exeter City	18 August 1987
Brentford	2–1	Southend United	18 August 1987
Bristol Rovers	1–0	Hereford United	19 August 1987
Bury	2–2	Preston North End	18 August 1987
Cambridge United	1–1	Aldershot	18 August 1987
Cardiff City	1–2	Newport County	18 August 1987
Chesterfield	2–1	Peterborough United	18 August 1987
Crewe Alexandra	3–3	Shrewsbury Town	25 August 1987
Fulham	3–1	Colchester United	18 August 1987
Gillingham	1–0	Brighton & Hove Albion	18 August 1987
Grimsby Town	3–2	Darlington	18 August 1987
Halifax Town	1–1	York City	18 August 1987
Leyton Orient	1–1	Millwall	18 August 1987
Mansfield Town	2–2	Birmingham City	18 August 1987
Port Vale	0–1	Northampton Town	17 August 1987
Rochdale	3–1	Tranmere Rovers	18 August 1987
Rotherham United	4–4	Huddersfield Town	18 August 1987
Scarborough	1–0	Doncaster Rovers	19 August 1987
Scunthorpe United	3–1	Hartlepool United	18 August 1987
Stockport County	0–1	Carlisle United	18 August 1987
Sunderland	1–0	Middlesbrough	18 August 1987
Swindon Town	3–0	Bristol City	18 August 1987
Torquay United	2–1	Swansea City	18 August 1987
West Bromwich Albion	2–3	Walsall	19 August 1987
Wigan Athletic	2–3	Bolton Wanderers	18 August 1987
Wolverhampton Wanderers	3–0	Notts County	18 August 1987
Wrexham	1–0	Burnley	18 August 1987

=== Second leg ===
Home team	Score	Away team	Date	Agg.
Aldershot	1–4	Cambridge United	25 August 1987	2–5
Birmingham City	0–1	Mansfield Town	25 August 1987	2–3
Bolton Wanderers	1–3	Wigan Athletic	25 August 1987	4–5
Brighton & Hove Albion	1–0	Gillingham	26 August 1987	1–1
Bristol City	3–2	Swindon Town	25 August 1987	3–5
Burnley	3–0	Wrexham	25 August 1987	3–1
Cardiff City	2–2	Newport County	25 August 1987	3–4
Carlisle United	3–0	Stockport County	25 August 1987	4–0
Chester City	1–0	Blackpool	26 August 1987	1–2
Colchester United	0–2	Fulham	25 August 1987	1–5
Darlington	2–1	Grimsby Town	26 August 1987	4–4
Doncaster Rovers	3–1	Scarborough	25 August 1987	3–2
Exeter City	1–3	Bournemouth	26 August 1987	2–4
Hartlepool United	0–1	Scunthorpe United	26 August 1987	1–4
Hereford United	2–0	Bristol Rovers	26 August 1987	2–1
Huddersfield Town	1–3	Rotherham United	25 August 1987	5–7
Middlesbrough	2–0	Sunderland	25 August 1987	2–1
Millwall	1–0	Leyton Orient	25 August 1987	2–1
Northampton Town	4–0	Port Vale	2 September 1987	5–0
Notts County	1–2	Wolverhampton Wanderers	25 August 1987	1–5
Peterborough United	2–0	Chesterfield	26 August 1987	3–2
Preston North End	2–3	Bury	25 August 1987	4–5
Shrewsbury Town	4–1	Crewe Alexandra	8 September 1987	7–4
Southend United	4–2	Brentford	25 August 1987	5–4
Swansea City	1–1	Torquay United	25 August 1987	2–3
Tranmere Rovers	1–0	Rochdale	25 August 1987	2–3
Walsall	0–0	West Bromwich Albion	25 August 1987	3–2
York City	1–0	Halifax Town	25 August 1987	2–1

== Second round ==
=== First leg ===
Home team	Score	Away team	Date
Barnsley	0–0	West Ham United	22 September 1987
Blackburn Rovers	1–1	Liverpool	23 September 1987
Blackpool	1–0	Newcastle United	23 September 1987
Bournemouth	1–0	Southampton	22 September 1987
Burnley	1–1	Norwich City	22 September 1987
Bury	2–1	Sheffield United	22 September 1987
Cambridge United	0–1	Coventry City	22 September 1987
Carlisle United	4–3	Oldham Athletic	22 September 1987
Charlton Athletic	3–0	Walsall	23 September 1987
Crystal Palace	4–0	Newport County	22 September 1987
Darlington	0–3	Watford	22 September 1987
Doncaster Rovers	0–3	Arsenal	23 September 1987
Everton	3–2	Rotherham United	22 September 1987
Fulham	1–5	Bradford City	22 September 1987
Ipswich Town	1–1	Northampton Town	22 September 1987
Leeds United	1–1	York City	23 September 1987
Leicester City	2–1	Scunthorpe United	23 September 1987
Manchester City	1–2	Wolverhampton Wanderers	22 September 1987
Manchester United	5–0	Hull City	23 September 1987
Middlesbrough	0–1	Aston Villa	23 September 1987
Nottingham Forest	5–0	Hereford United	23 September 1987
Oxford United	1–1	Mansfield Town	23 September 1987
Peterborough United	4–1	Plymouth Argyle	23 September 1987
Queens Park Rangers	2–1	Millwall	23 September 1987
Reading	3–1	Chelsea	23 September 1987
Rochdale	1–1	Wimbledon	22 September 1987
Shrewsbury Town	1–1	Sheffield Wednesday	22 September 1987
Southend United	1–0	Derby County	22 September 1987
Stoke City	2–0	Gillingham	22 September 1987
Swindon Town	3–1	Portsmouth	22 September 1987
Torquay United	1–0	Tottenham Hotspur	23 September 1987
Wigan Athletic	0–1	Luton Town	22 September 1987

=== Second leg ===
Home team	Score	Away team	Date	Agg.
Arsenal	1–0	Doncaster Rovers	6 October 1987	4–0
Aston Villa	1–0	Middlesbrough	7 October 1987	2–0
Bradford City	2–1	Fulham	7 October 1987	7–2
Chelsea	3–2	Reading	7 October 1987	4–5
Coventry City	2–1	Cambridge United	6 October 1987	3–1
Derby County	0–0	Southend United	7 October 1987	0–1
Gillingham	0–1	Stoke City	6 October 1987	0–3
Hereford United	1–1	Nottingham Forest	7 October 1987	1–6
Hull City	0–1	Manchester United	7 October 1987	0–6
Liverpool	1–0	Blackburn Rovers	6 October 1987	2–1
Luton Town	4–2	Wigan Athletic	6 October 1987	5–2
Mansfield Town	0–2	Oxford United	6 October 1987	1–3
Millwall	0–0	Queens Park Rangers	6 October 1987	1–2
Newcastle United	4–1	Blackpool	7 October 1987	4–2
Newport County	0–2	Crystal Palace	6 October 1987	0–6
Northampton Town	2–4	Ipswich Town	7 October 1987	3–5
Norwich City	1–0	Burnley	7 October 1987	2–1
Oldham Athletic	4–1	Carlisle United	6 October 1987	7–5
Plymouth Argyle	1–1	Peterborough United	6 October 1987	2–5
Portsmouth	1–3	Swindon Town	7 October 1987	2–6
Rotherham United	0–0	Everton	6 October 1987	2–3
Scunthorpe United	1–2	Leicester City	6 October 1987	2–4
Sheffield United	1–1	Bury	7 October 1987	2–3
Sheffield Wednesday	2–1	Shrewsbury Town	6 October 1987	3–2
Southampton	2–2	Bournemouth	6 October 1987	2–3
Tottenham Hotspur	3–0	Torquay United	7 October 1987	3–1
Walsall	2–0	Charlton Athletic	6 October 1987	2–3
Watford	8–0	Darlington	6 October 1987	11–0
West Ham United	2–5	Barnsley	6 October 1987	2–5
Wimbledon	2–1	Rochdale	6 October 1987	3–2
Wolverhampton Wanderers	0–2	Manchester City	6 October 1987	2–3
York City	0–4	Leeds United	6 October 1987	1–5

== Third round ==
Home team	Score	Away team	Date
Arsenal	3–0	Bournemouth	27 October 1987
Aston Villa	2–1	Tottenham Hotspur	28 October 1987
Barnsley	1–2	Sheffield Wednesday	27 October 1987
Bury	1–0	Queens Park Rangers	27 October 1987
Charlton Athletic	0–1	Bradford City	27 October 1987
Ipswich Town	1–0	Southend United	27 October 1987
Leeds United	2–2	Oldham Athletic	28 October 1987
Liverpool	0–1	Everton	28 October 1987
Luton Town	3–1	Coventry City	27 October 1987
Manchester City	3–0	Nottingham Forest	27 October 1987
Manchester United	2–1	Crystal Palace	28 October 1987
Oxford United	0–0	Leicester City	28 October 1987
Peterborough United	0–0	Reading	28 October 1987
Stoke City	2–1	Norwich City	27 October 1987
Swindon Town	1–1	Watford	28 October 1987
Wimbledon	2–1	Newcastle United	28 October 1987

=== Replays ===
Home team	Score	Away team	Date
Leicester City	2–3	Oxford United	4 November 1987
Oldham Athletic	4–2	Leeds United	4 November 1987
Reading	1–0	Peterborough United	4 November 1987
Watford	4–2	Swindon Town	3 November 1987

== Fourth round ==
Bury v Manchester United was switched to Old Trafford.

Home team	Score	Away team	Date
Arsenal	3–0	Stoke City	17 November 1987
Aston Villa	1–2	Sheffield Wednesday	18 November 1987
Bury	1–2	Manchester United	18 November 1987
Everton	2–1	Oldham Athletic	17 November 1987
Ipswich Town	0–1	Luton Town	17 November 1987
Manchester City	3–1	Watford	17 November 1987
Oxford United	2–1	Wimbledon	18 November 1987
Reading	0–0	Bradford City	18 November 1987

=== Replay ===
Home team	Score	Away team	Date
Bradford City	1–0	Reading	24 November 1987

== Fifth Round ==
Home team	Score	Away team	Date
Luton Town	2–0	Bradford City	19 January 1988
Everton	2–0	Manchester City	20 January 1988
Oxford United	2–0	Manchester United	20 January 1988
Sheffield Wednesday	0–1	Arsenal	20 January 1988

== Semi-finals ==
Defending league champions Everton, still yet to win the League Cup, had their dreams of winning the trophy ended when they were well beaten over the two legs of the semi-final by holders Arsenal. In the other semi-final, 1986 winners Oxford United were ousted by Luton Town.

=== First leg ===
Home team	Score	Away team	Date
Everton	0–1	Arsenal	7 February 1988
Oxford United	1–1	Luton Town	10 February 1988

=== Second leg ===
Home team	Score	Away team	Date	Agg
Arsenal	3–1	Everton	24 February 1988	4–1
Luton Town	2–0	Oxford United	28 February 1988	3–1

== Final ==
24 April 1988
14:30

Luton Town	3–2	Arsenal
Stein 13', 90'; Wilson 82'		Hayes 71'; Smith 74'

Wembley Stadium, London
Attendance: 95,732
Referee: Joe Worrall
