= 1992–93 Luton Town F.C. season =

English football club season

Luton Town
1992–93 season
- Chairman: David Kohler
- Manager: David Pleat
- Stadium: Kenilworth Road
- First Division: 20th
- FA Cup: Fourth round
- League Cup: Second round
- Anglo-Italian Cup: Qualifying round
- Top goalscorer: League: Phil Gray (19); All: Phil Gray (20)
- Highest home attendance: 10,959 (vs. West Ham United, First Division, 13 April 1993)
- Lowest home attendance: 2,538 (vs. Bristol City, Anglo-Italian Cup, 18 April 1992)
- Average home league attendance: 8,212

The 1992–93 season was the 107th season in the history of the Luton Town Football Club. It was Luton Town's 72nd consecutive season in the English Football League, and their 75th overall. It was their first season back in the second tier following relegation in the 1991–92 season which deprived them of a place in the new FA Premier League.

This article covers the period from 1 July 1992 to 30 June 1993.

== Season summary ==
During the 1992–93 English football season, Luton Town F.C. competed in the Football League First Division. It was the second season of David Pleat's second spell as Luton Town manager, having previously been the club's manager from 1978 to 1986. Luton Town, newly relegated from the top flight, spent the season battling at the wrong end of the division but managed to avoid a second successive relegation. Luton did not fare much better in cup competitions. They were eliminated in the first round that they entered of both the League Cup and Anglo-Italian Cup while only progressing through one round of the FA Cup before falling to a heavy 5–1 defeat to fellow First Division side Derby County.

== Final league table ==
Pos	Team	Pld	W	D	L	GF	GA	GD	Pts	Qualification or relegation
18	Southend United	46	13	13	20	54	64	−10	52	
19	Birmingham City	46	13	12	21	50	72	−22	51	
20	Luton Town	46	10	21	15	48	62	−14	51	
21	Sunderland	46	13	11	22	50	64	−14	50	
22	Brentford (R)	46	13	10	23	52	71	−19	49	Relegation to the Second Division

Source: rsssf.com
Rules for classification: 1) Points; 2) Goals scored; 3) Goal difference
(R) Relegated

== Results ==
Luton Town's score comes first

=== Legend ===
Win	Draw	Loss

=== Football League First Division ===
Date	Opponent	Venue	Result	Attendance	Scorers
15 August 1992	Leicester City	Away	1–2	17,424	Jamie Campbell
22 August 1992	Bristol City	Home	0–3	7,926	
29 August 1992	Charlton Athletic	Away	0–0	6,291	
2 September 1992	Newcastle United	Away	0–2	27,082	
5 September 1992	Tranmere Rovers	Home	3–3	6,801	Steve Claridge, Des Linton, Scott Oakes
13 September 1992	Brentford	Away	2–1	7,413	Julian James, Phil Gray
19 September 1992	Birmingham City	Home	1–1	8,481	Steve Claridge(pen)
26 September 1992	Notts County	Away	0–0	5,992	
3 October 1992	Portsmouth	Home	1–4	7,954	John Dreyer
10 October 1992	Barnsley	Away	0–3	5,261	
17 October 1992	Derby County	Home	1–3	8,848	Marvin Johnson
24 October 1992	Peterborough United	Away	3–2	7,125	Phil Gray(2), Paul Telfer
31 October 1992	Southend United	Home	2–2	7,256	Julian James, Phil Gray
3 November 1992	Cambridge United	Away	3–3	5,716	Scott Oakes, Phil Gray(2)
7 November 1992	Grimsby Town	Home	1–4	6,928	Phil Gray
14 November 1992	Oxford United	Away	0–4	5,759	
21 November 1992	Millwall	Home	1–1	8,371	Phil Gray
29 November 1992	Watford	Home	2–0	8,341	Ian Benjamin, Scott Oakes
5 December 1992	Bristol Rovers	Away	0–2	6,240	
12 December 1992	Wolverhampton Wanderers	Away	2–1	13,932	Phil Gray(2)
19 December 1992	Sunderland	Home	0–0	8,286	
28 December 1992	West Ham United	Away	2–2	18,786	Ceri Hughes, John Dreyer
9 January 1993	Birmingham City	Away	1–2	9,601	Ceri Hughes
16 January 1993	Notts County	Home	0–0	6,729	
27 January 1993	Newcastle United	Home	0–0	10,237	
30 January 1993	Bristol City	Away	0–0	8,877	
6 February 1993	Leicester City	Home	2–0	9,140	Marvin Johnson, Phil Gray
9 February 1993	Brentford	Home	0–0	7,248	
13 February 1993	Tranmere Rovers	Away	2–0	8,723	Phil Gray, Marvin Johnson
20 February 1993	Charlton Athletic	Home	1–0	8,443	Phil Gray
27 February 1993	Barnsley	Home	2–2	7,595	Kerry Dixon, Phil Gray(pen)
6 March 1993	Portsmouth	Away	1–2	10,457	Phil Gray
9 March 1993	Oxford United	Home	3–1	6,687	David Preece, Phil Gray, Scott Oakes
13 March 1993	Grimsby Town	Away	1–3	5,193	Phil Gray
17 March 1993	Swindon Town	Home	0–0	8,902	
20 March 1993	Bristol Rovers	Home	1–1	7,717	Maddison(OG)
24 March 1993	Millwall	Away	0–1	8,287	
27 March 1993	Cambridge United	Home	2–0	8,077	Kerry Dixon, Scott Oakes
3 April 1993	Watford	Away	0–0	10,656	
7 April 1993	Wolverhampton Wanderers	Home	1–1	7,948	Phil Gray
10 April 1993	Swindon Town	Away	0–1	11,004	
13 April 1993	West Ham United	Home	2–0	10,959	Phil Gray(pen), Martin Williams
17 April 1993	Sunderland	Away	2–2	16,493	David Preece, Paul Telfer
24 April 1993	Derby County	Away	1–1	13,741	David Preece
1 May 1993	Peterborough United	Home	0–0	10,011	
8 May 1993	Southend United	Away	1–2	11,913	Kerry Dixon

=== FA Cup ===
Round	Date	Opponent	Venue	Result	Attendance	Goalscorers
R3	19 January 1993	Bristol City	Home	2–0	6,092	Phil Gray, Ceri Hughes
R4	23 January 1993	Derby County	Home	1–5	9,170	Paul Telfer

=== League Cup ===
Round	Date	Opponent	Venue	Result	Attendance	Goalscorers
R2 1st leg	23 September 1992	Plymouth Argyle	Home	2–2	3,702	Steve Claridge(2)
R2 2nd leg	6 October 1992	Plymouth Argyle	Away	2–3	8,946	Steve Claridge, David Preece

=== Anglo-Italian Cup ===
Round	Date	Opponent	Venue	Result	Attendance	Goalscorers
Q Group	15 September 1992	Watford	Away	0–0	5,197	
Q Group	29 September 1992	Bristol City	Home	1–1	2,538	Steve Claridge

== Squad ==
Note: Flags indicate national team as defined under FIFA eligibility rules; some limited exceptions apply. Players may hold more than one non-FIFA nationality.

Pos.	Nation	Player
GK	ENG	Alec Chamberlain
GK	AUS	Andy Petterson
DF	ENG	Marvin Johnson
DF	ENG	Julian James
DF	ENG	John Dreyer
DF	ENG	Richard Harvey
DF	ENG	Des Linton
DF	ENG	Trevor Peake
DF	IRL	David Greene
DF	ENG	Jamie Campbell
DF	SCO	Darren Salton
DF	ENG	Aaron Skelton
MF	ENG	David Preece

Pos.	Nation	Player
MF	SCO	Paul Telfer
MF	WAL	Jason Rees
MF	WAL	Ceri Hughes
MF	ENG	Chris Kamara
MF	ENG	Damian Matthew
FW	ENG	Scott Oakes
FW	ENG	Kerry Dixon
FW	WAL	John Hartson
FW	ENG	Tony Thorpe
FW	ENG	Martin Williams
FW	NIR	Phil Gray
FW	ENG	Steve Claridge
FW	ENG	Ian Benjamin

== Player statistics ==
Pos.	Name	League		FA Cup		League Cup		Anglo Cup		Total	
Pos.	Name	Apps	Goals	Apps	Goals	Apps	Goals	Apps	Goals	Apps	Goals
FW	(Northern Ireland) Phil Gray	45	19	2	1	2	0	2	0	51	20
FW	(England) Scott Oakes	25 (19)	5	(2)	0	1 (1)	0	(2)	0	26 (24)	5
DF	(England) Julian James	43	2	2	0	2	0	2	0	49	2
MF	(England) David Preece	43	3	2	0	2	1	1 (1)	0	48 (1)	4
DF	(England) Trevor Peake	40	0	2	0	2	0	1	0	45	0
DF	(England) Marvin Johnson	38 (2)	3	2	0	2	0	1	0	43 (2)	3
DF	(England) John Dreyer	38	2	2	0	(1)	0	1	0	41 (1)	2
MF	(Wales) Jason Rees	29 (3)	0	2	0	1 (1)	0	2	0	34 (4)	0
GK	(England) Alec Chamberlain	32	0	2	0	0	0	0	0	34	0
MF	(Scotland) Paul Telfer	30 (2)	2	2	1	0	0	0	0	32 (2)	3
MF	(Wales) Ceri Hughes	26 (3)	2	2	1	0	0	0	0	28 (3)	3
MF	(England) Chris Kamara	21	0	0	0	2	0	2	0	25	0
DF	(England) Des Linton	17 (3)	1	0	0	2	0	2	0	21 (3)	1
FW	(England) Martin Williams	7 (15)	1	0	0	0	0	0	0	7 (15)	1
FW	(England) Steve Claridge	15 (1)	2	0	0	2	3	2	1	19 (1)	6
DF	(Scotland) Darren Salton	15	0	0	0	2	0	2	0	19	0
GK	(Australia) Andy Petterson	14	0	0	0	2	0	2	0	18	0
FW	(England) Kerry Dixon	16 (1)	3	0	0	0	0	0	0	16 (1)	3
FW	(England) Ian Benjamin	5 (5)	1	2	0	0	0	0	0	7 (5)	1
MF	(England) Damian Matthew	3 (2)	0	0	0	0	0	1	0	4 (2)	0
DF	(England) Jamie Campbell	2	1	2	0	0	0	1	0	3	1
DF	(England) Richard Harvey	1	0	(2)	0	0	0	0	0	1 (2)	0
DF	(Republic of Ireland) David Greene	1	0	0	0	0	0	0	0	1	0
—	own goal	—	1	—	0	—	0	—	0	—	1
