= 1991–92 Luton Town F.C. season =

English football club season

Luton Town
1991–92 season
- Chairman: Peter Nelkin
- Manager: David Pleat
- Football League First Division: 20th (relegated)
- FA Cup: Third round
- Football League Cup: Second round
- Full Members Cup: Second round
- Top goalscorer: League: Mick Harford (12); All: Mick Harford (12)
- Highest home attendance: 13,410 (vs. Manchester United, First Division, 18 April 1992)
- Lowest home attendance: 6,315 (vs. Birmingham City, Football League Cup, 25 September 1991)
- Average home league attendance: 9,728
Home colours	Away colours	Third colours

The 1991–92 season was the 106th season in the history of Luton Town Football Club. It was Luton Town's 71st consecutive season in the Football League, and their 74th overall. It was also their tenth successive season in the First Division, and their 16th overall. Luton Town were relegated on the season's final day, and thus condemned to second-tier football for the following season. This deprived them of a place in the new FA Premier League.

It was the first season of David Pleat's second spell as Luton Town manager; he had returned in the 1991 close season as successor to Jimmy Ryan, having previously been the club's manager from 1978 to 1986.

This article covers the period from 1 July 1991 to 30 June 1992.

== Background ==
The 1985–86 season was David Pleat's final year with Luton, and it was a success as Luton finished ninth. Even following his departure, the team continued to play well – 1986–87 saw a best-ever finish of seventh under John Moore. The following year Ray Harford's team won the League Cup with a 3–2 victory over Arsenal, and finished ninth in the league to boot. However, 1988–89 saw Luton drop to 16th, and in 1989–90 the team were battling relegation by December. The replacement of Harford with Jimmy Ryan in January saw Luton improve enough to escape demotion on the final day of the season, a feat that Ryan's team repeated a year later. Despite keeping Luton in Division One for a ninth successive season, Ryan was fired by chairman Peter Nelkin two days later due a "personality clash". David Pleat was promptly re-appointed in his stead.

== Review ==
=== July–September ===
Right away, Pleat was forced to sell, as homesick star forward Lars Elstrup was sold back to Odense for £200,000. Brian Stein was brought back as his replacement, while another striker, Phil Gray, was signed from Tottenham Hotspur. On the pitch, the season started badly – Luton did not score a goal for four matches, and failed to win in five. Trevor Peake arrived on 27 August, while Kingsley Black, the Northern Ireland international, was sold to Nottingham Forest for £1.5 million on 2 September.

The first victory of the season came two days after the sale of Black, as Luton defeated Southampton 2–1 at Kenilworth Road. Wimbledon then inflicted a 3–0 reverse at Selhurst Park, before the news came that former player Mick Harford had returned from Derby County to lead the forward line. Harford scored two in his first match, to secure a 2–1 win over Oldham Athletic. However, Luton then lost 1–0 at home to Queens Park Rangers before Manchester United piled on the misery with a 5–0 demolition at Old Trafford. A 1–1 draw with Notts County rounded up the month.

=== October–December ===
Two months then followed without a win, as Dave Beaumont left for Hibernian and new signing Steve Thompson left after only seven matches in a swap deal with Leicester City for Des Linton and Scott Oakes. Talented full back Matt Jackson also moved on, to sign for Everton. Form was no better in the cups, as Luton were knocked out of both the League Cup and the Full Members' Cup in October. The acquisition of goalkeeper Steve Sutton in November raised spirits, though Luton's next victory did not come until 20 December, when a Harford goal sealed a 1–0 win over Coventry. The next two matches were at home, and Luton won them both – another goal from Harford secured a defeat of Arsenal on Boxing Day, and Chelsea were beaten 2–0 two days later. Despite three successive wins, Luton still remained in the relegation zone on New Year's Day.

=== January–March ===
January was a fruitless month – Nottingham Forest's Des Walker scored an injury-time equaliser to deny Luton their first away win, and the team crashed out of the FA Cup at Sheffield United three days later. Graham Rodger was sold to Hibernian on 8 January, and Chris Kamara was acquired as a replacement. Three consecutive defeats preceded a win against Norwich City on 8 February. Manchester City then beat Luton 4–0 at Maine Road, before Sheffield United visited Kenilworth Road in the League – this time around, Luton won 2–1. The next six matches saw four draws and two losses – tellingly, Luton had not won on the road all season. The board refused to pay the fee to keep Sutton, and so he signed for Derby County instead. Mervyn Day was brought in as a short-term replacement, while midfielder Darron McDonough moved to Newcastle United.

=== April–June ===
Imre Varadi arrived on loan and scored on his debut as Luton beat Wimbledon. A week later, Luton lost 5–1 at Oldham. Victory over Nottingham Forest at Kenilworth Road gave Luton hope – they were now only three points behind Coventry City with four matches left. Luton drew at home to Manchester United on the 18th to reduced the gap to two points as Coventry lost to Everton. Coventry lost again two days later, but as Luton slumped to defeat at Queens Park Rangers no ground was made up. The task was made even more difficult as Luton's terrible goal difference meant that they would have to finish ahead of Coventry on points to stay up. Luton beat Aston Villa on 25 April, but Coventry beat West Ham United, and the gap was still two points.

For Luton to stay up, they would have to win their first away match of the campaign at already-relegated Notts County and hope for an Aston Villa victory over Coventry. Julian James gave Luton the lead required, but two goals from County's Rob Matthews put the seal on a dismal season. Despite losing 2–0 at Villa Park, Coventry stayed up and Luton were relegated after ten years of Division One football.

Ever-present midfielder Mark Pembridge left for Derby County for a £1.25 million fee in June.

== Match results ==
Luton Town results given first.

=== Legend ===
Win	Draw	Loss

=== Football League First Division ===
Date	Opponent	Venue	Result	Attendance	Scorers	Notes
17 August 1991	West Ham United	Away	0–0	25,079	—	
21 August 1991	Coventry City	Away	0–5	9,848	—	
24 August 1991	Liverpool	Home	0–0	11,132	—	
27 August 1991	Arsenal	Away	0–2	25,898	—	
31 August 1991	Chelsea	Away	1–4	17,457	Gray	
4 September 1991	Southampton	Home	2–1	8,055	Gray, Harvey	
7 September 1991	Wimbledon	Away	0–3	3,231	—	
14 September 1991	Oldham Athletic	Home	2–1	9,005	Harford (2)	
17 September 1991	Queens Park Rangers	Home	0–1	9,185	—	
21 September 1991	Manchester United	Away	0–5	46,491	—	
28 September 1991	Notts County	Home	1–1	7,629	Gray	
5 October 1991	Aston Villa	Away	0–4	18,722	—	
19 October 1991	Sheffield Wednesday	Home	2–2	9,401	Harford, Nogan	
26 October 1991	Norwich City	Away	0–1	10,514	—	
2 November 1991	Everton	Home	0–1	8,002	—	
16 November 1991	Tottenham Hotspur	Away	1–4	27,643	Harford	
23 November 1991	Manchester City	Home	2–2	10,031	Harford, Dreyer	
30 November 1991	Sheffield United	Away	1–1	21,804	Telfer	
7 December 1991	Leeds United	Home	0–2	11,550	—	
20 December 1991	Coventry City	Home	1–0	7,533	Harford	
26 December 1991	Arsenal	Home	1–0	12,665	Harford	
28 December 1991	Chelsea	Home	2–0	10,738	Harvey, Dreyer (pen)	
1 January 1992	Nottingham Forest	Away	1–1	23,809	Pembridge	
11 January 1992	Liverpool	Away	1–2	35,095	own goal	
18 January 1992	West Ham United	Home	0–1	11,088	—	
1 February 1992	Sheffield Wednesday	Away	2–3	22,291	Preece, Oakes	
8 February 1992	Norwich City	Home	2–0	8,554	Preece, Harford	
15 February 1992	Manchester City	Away	0–4	22,137	—	
22 February 1992	Sheffield United	Home	2–1	9,003	Stein, Harford	
25 February 1992	Crystal Palace	Away	1–1	12,109	Pembridge (pen)	
29 February 1992	Leeds United	Away	0–2	28,227	—	
7 March 1992	Crystal Palace	Home	1–1	8,591	Oakes	
11 March 1992	Tottenham Hotspur	Home	0–0	11,494	—	
14 March 1992	Everton	Away	1–1	17,388	Stein	
21 March 1992	Southampton	Away	1–2	14,192	Pembridge	
4 April 1992	Wimbledon	Home	2–1	7,753	Varadi, Preece	
11 April 1992	Oldham Athletic	Away	1–5	13,210	Harford	
14 April 1992	Nottingham Forest	Home	2–1	8,014	Harford, James	
18 April 1992	Manchester United	Home	1–1	13,410	Harford	
20 April 1992	Queens Park Rangers	Away	1–2	10,749	Mark Pembridge (pen)	
25 April 1992	Aston Villa	Home	2–0	11,178	Stein, Pembridge	
2 May 1992	Notts County	Away	1–2	11,380	James	

=== FA Cup ===
Round	Date	Opponent	Venue	Result	Attendance	Goalscorers	Notes
3rd round	4 January 1992	Sheffield United	Away	0–4	12,201	—	

=== Football League Cup ===
Round	Date	Opponent	Venue	Result	Attendance	Goalscorers	Notes
2nd round 1st Leg	25 September 1991	Birmingham City	Away	2–2	6,315	Gray, Nogan	
2nd round 2nd Leg	8 October 1991	Birmingham City	Away	2–3	13,252	Gray (2)	

=== Full Members Cup ===
Round	Date	Opponent	Venue	Result	Attendance	Goalscorers	Notes
2nd round	22 October 1991	Ipswich Town	Away	1–1	5,750	Telfer	^{[A]}

== League table ==
Pos	Team	Pld	W	D	L	GF	GA	GD	Pts	Qualification or relegation
18	Norwich City	42	11	12	19	47	63	−16	45	Qualification for the FA Premier League
19	Coventry City	42	11	11	20	35	44	−9	44	Qualification for the FA Premier League
20	Luton Town (R)	42	10	12	20	38	71	−33	42	Relegation to the First Division (Note: From the 1992–93 season, the first tier became the Premier League, and the second tier, then known as the Second Division, was renamed to the First Division.)
21	Notts County (R)	42	10	10	22	40	62	−22	40	Relegation to the First Division
22	West Ham United (R)	42	9	11	22	37	59	−22	38	Relegation to the First Division

Source: World Football
Rules for classification: 1) Points; 2) Goal difference; 3) Goals scored
(R) Relegated

== Player details ==
Last match played on 2 May 1992.
Players arranged in order of starts (in all competitions), with the greater number of substitute appearances taking precedence in case of an equal number of started matches.

Pos.	Name	League		FA Cup		League Cup		FM Cup		Total	
Pos.	Name	Apps	Goals	Apps	Goals	Apps	Goals	Apps	Goals	Apps	Goals
MF	(Wales) Mark Pembridge	42	5	1	0	2	0	1	0	46	5
DF	(England) John Dreyer	42	2	1	0	1	0	0	0	44	2
DF	(England) Trevor Peake	38	0	1	0	1	0	0	0	40	0
MF	(England) David Preece	34 (4)	3	1	0	2	0	0	0	37 (4)	3
FW	(England) Brian Stein	32 (7)	3	1	0	1 (1)	0	0	0	34 (8)	3
DF	(England) Richard Harvey	31 (1)	2	1	0	1	0	0	0	33 (1)	2
FW	(England) Mick Harford	29	12	0	0	1	0	1	0	31	12
DF	(England) Julian James	28	2	1	0	0	0	1	0	30	2
DF	(England) Chris Kamara	28	0	1	0	0	0	0	0	29	0
GK	(England) Alec Chamberlain	24	0	1	0	2	0	1	0	28	0
MF	(Scotland) Paul Telfer	17 (3)	1	1	0	2	0	1	1	21 (3)	2
MF	(England) Scott Oakes	15 (6)	2	1	0	0	0	0	0	16 (6)	2
GK	(England) Steve Sutton	14	0	0	0	0	0	0	0	14	0
DF	(Scotland) Graham Rodger	11 (1)	0	0	0	1	0	1	0	13 (1)	0
FW	(Northern Ireland) Phil Gray	9 (5)	3	0	0	2	3	0	0	11 (5)	6
MF	(England) Darron McDonough	9	0	0	0	0	0	0	0	9	0
DF	(England) Matt Jackson	7 (2)	0	0	0	2	0	0	0	9 (2)	0
DF	(Scotland) Dave Beaumont	6 (3)	0	0	0	2	0	0	0	8 (3)	0
MF	(Wales) Ceri Hughes	6 (12)	0	0	0	0	0	1	0	7 (12)	0
FW	(Wales) Kurt Nogan	6 (8)	1	0	0	0 (2)	1	1	0	7 (10)	2
MF	(England) Steve Thompson	5	0	2	0	0	0	0	0	7	0
MF	(England) Imre Varadi	5 (1)	1	0	0	0	0	0	0	5 (1)	1
FW	(England) Jamie Campbell	4 (7)	0	0 (1)	0	0	0	0 (1)	0	4 (9)	0
DF	(Scotland) Darren Salton	2 (1)	0	0	0	1	0	1	0	4 (1)	0
MF	(Northern Ireland) Kingsley Black	4	0	0	0	0	0	0	0	4	0
GK	(England) Mervyn Day	4	0	0	0	0	0	0	0	4	0
MF	(Wales) Jason Rees	3 (2)	0	0	0	0	0	0 (1)	0	3 (3)	0
FW	(England) Sean Farrell	3 (1)	0	0	0	0	0	0	0	3 (1)	0
DF	(England) Des Linton	2 (1)	0	0	0	0	0	0	0	2 (1)	0
MF	(England) Martin Williams	0 (1)	0	0	0	0	0	1	0	1 (1)	0
FW	(Scotland) Lee Glover	1	0	0	0	0	0	0	0	1	0
MF	(England) Paul Holsgrove	1	0	0	0	0	0	0	0	1	0
DF	(England) Tim Allpress	0	0	0	0	0	0	1	0	1	0
—	own goal	—	1	—	0	—	0	—	0	—	1

== Transfers ==
=== In ===
Date	Player	From	Fee	Notes
July 1991	(England) Brian Stein	(France) FC Annecy		
13 August 1991	(England) Steve Thompson	Bolton Wanderers	£180,000	
16 August 1991	(Northern Ireland) Phil Gray	Tottenham Hotspur	£275,000	
27 August 1991	(England) Trevor Peake	Coventry City	£100,000	
12 September 1991	(England) Mick Harford	Derby County	£325,000	
13 September 1991	(England) Martin Williams	Leicester City	Free	
22 October 1991	(England) Scott Oakes	Leicester City	Swap	^{[C]}
22 October 1991	(England) Des Linton	Leicester City	Swap	^{[C]}
11 January 1992	(England) Chris Kamara	Leeds United	£150,000	

=== Out ===
Date	Player	To	Fee	Notes
1991	(Denmark) Lars Elstrup	(Denmark) Odense Boldklub	£200,000	
2 September 1991	(Northern Ireland) Kingsley Black	Nottingham Forest	£1,500,000	
10 October 1991	(Scotland) Dave Beaumont	(Scotland) Hibernian	£110,000	
18 October 1991	(England) Matt Jackson	Everton	£600,000	
22 October 1991	(England) Steve Thompson	Leicester City	Swap	^{[C]}
29 October 1991	(England) Tim Allpress	Released		
1 November 1991	(England) Paul Holsgrove	(Netherlands) Heracles Almelo	Free	
19 December 1991	(England) Sean Farrell	Fulham	£100,000	
8 January 1992	(Scotland) Graham Rodger	Grimsby Town	£135,000	
March 1992	(England) Darron McDonough	Newcastle United	£90,000	
2 June 1992	(Wales) Mark Pembridge	Derby County	£1,250,000	

=== Loans in ===
Date	Player	From	End date	Notes
2 September 1991	(Scotland) Lee Glover	Nottingham Forest	6 September 1991	
28 November 1991	(England) Steve Sutton	Nottingham Forest	1 March 1992	
4 March 1992	(England) Mervyn Day	Leeds United	22 March 1992	
26 March 1992	(England) Imre Varadi	Leeds United	3 May 1992	

=== Loans out ===
Date	Player	To	End date	Notes
12 September 1991	(England) Julian James	Preston North End	10 October 1991	
13 September 1991	(England) Sean Farrell	Northampton Town	6 October 1991	
13 November 1991	(United States) Juergen Sommer	Brighton & Hove Albion	13 December 1991	

== See also ==
- 1991–92 in English football

== Footnotes ==
A. Lost 2–1 on penalties
B. Upon its formation for the 1992–93 season, the FA Premier League became the top tier of English football; the First, Second and Third Divisions then became the second, third and fourth tiers, respectively.
C. Steve Thompson moved to Leicester City in exchange for Des Linton and Scott Oakes.
