= 1994–95 Luton Town F.C. season =

English football club season

Luton Town
1994–95 season
- Chairman: David Kohler
- Manager: David Pleat
- Stadium: Kenilworth Road
- First Division: 16th
- FA Cup: Fourth round
- League Cup: First round
- Average home league attendance: 7,350

During the 1994–95 English football season, Luton Town F.C. competed in the Football League First Division.

== Season summary ==
Luton struggled once again in the 1994–95 season, with the side struggling to score at home. Pleat's Luton side, including young players such as Oakes, Telfer and John Hartson, reacted positively when Pleat turned down the advances of Tottenham Hotspur to return to North London as manager, and rocketed up to fifth in the table. Hartson was bought by Arsenal for £2,500,000 soon after, a British record for a teenager. The season petered out into obscurity following Hartson's sale, and Luton finished 16th. Pleat then left for a second time, moving to Sheffield Wednesday.

== Final league table ==
Pos	Team	Pld	W	D	L	GF	GA	GD	Pts
14	Oldham Athletic	46	16	13	17	60	60	0	61
15	Charlton Athletic	46	16	11	19	58	66	−8	59
16	Luton Town	46	15	13	18	61	64	−3	58
17	Port Vale	46	15	13	18	58	64	−6	58
18	Portsmouth	46	15	13	18	53	63	−10	58

Rules for classification: 1) Points; 2) Goals scored; 3) Goal difference

== Results ==
Luton Town's score comes first

=== Legend ===
Win	Draw	Loss

=== Football League First Division ===
Date	Opponent	Venue	Result	Attendance	Scorers
13 August 1994	West Bromwich Albion	H	1–1	8,640	Oakes
20 August 1994	Derby County	A	0–0	13,060	
27 August 1994	Southend United	H	2–2	5,918	Hartson, Hughes
30 August 1994	Tranmere Rovers	A	2–4	5,480	Hartson, Hughes
3 September 1994	Port Vale	A	1–0	8,541	Marshall
10 September 1994	Burnley	H	0–1	6,911	
13 September 1994	Bolton Wanderers	H	0–3	5,764	
17 September 1994	Watford	A	4–2	8,880	Oakes, Telfer (2), Dixon
24 September 1994	Millwall	A	0–0	7,150	
1 October 1994	Bristol City	H	0–1	6,633	
9 October 1994	Stoke City	A	2–1	11,712	Marshall, Preece
15 October 1994	Middlesbrough	H	5–1	8,412	Marshall (2), Preece, Hartson, Wilkinson (own goal)
22 October 1994	Sheffield United	A	3–1	13,317	Gayle (own goal), Dixon, James
29 October 1994	Barnsley	H	0–1	7,212	
1 November 1994	Grimsby Town	H	1–2	5,839	Oakes
5 November 1994	Wolverhampton Wanderers	A	3–2	26,749	Preece, Dixon, Marshall
12 November 1994	Oldham Athletic	A	0–0	7,907	
19 November 1994	Portsmouth	H	2–0	8,214	Dixon, Preece
26 November 1994	Swindon Town	A	2–1	9,455	Dixon, Oakes
3 December 1994	Sheffield United	H	3–6	8,516	Johnson, Gayle (own goal), Hartson
11 December 1994	Derby County	H	0–0	6,400	
18 December 1994	West Bromwich Albion	A	0–1	14,392	
26 December 1994	Reading	A	0–0	11,623	
27 December 1994	Sunderland	H	3–0	8,953	Oakes (2), Hartson
31 December 1994	Notts County	A	1–0	6,249	Telfer
2 January 1995	Charlton Athletic	H	0–1	7,642	
14 January 1995	Barnsley	A	1–3	4,808	Dixon
4 February 1995	Oldham Athletic	H	2–1	6,903	Marshall (2)
11 February 1995	Grimsby Town	A	0–5	??	
18 February 1995	Swindon Town	H	3–0	6,595	Marshall (2), Horlock (own goal)
21 February 1995	Portsmouth	A	2–3	7,363	James, Telfer
25 February 1995	Bristol City	A	2–2	7,939	Oakes (2)
4 March 1995	Millwall	H	1–1	6,864	Marshall
7 March 1995	Port Vale	H	2–1	5,947	Telfer, Dixon
11 March 1995	Southend United	A	0–3	4,558	
18 March 1995	Tranmere Rovers	H	2–0	6,660	James, Biggins
21 March 1995	Burnley	A	1–2	9,551	Marshall
26 March 1995	Watford	H	1–1	7,984	Telfer
4 April 1995	Wolverhampton Wanderers	H	3–3	9,651	Telfer (2), Taylor
8 April 1995	Notts County	H	2–0	6,428	Telfer, Oakes (pen)
11 April 1995	Bolton Wanderers	A	0–0	13,619	
15 April 1995	Sunderland	A	1–1	17,292	Taylor
17 April 1995	Reading	H	0–1	8,717	
22 April 1995	Charlton Athletic	A	0–1	10,918	
30 April 1995	Middlesbrough	A	1–2	23,903	Taylor
7 May 1995	Stoke City	H	2–3	8,252	Waddock, Harvey

=== FA Cup ===
Round	Date	Opponent	Venue	Result	Attendance	Goalscorers
R3	7 January 1995	Bristol Rovers	H	1–1	7,571	Hartson
R3R	18 January 1995	Bristol Rovers	A	1–0	8,218	Marshall
R4	28 January 1995	Southampton	H	1–1	9,938	Biggins
R4R	8 February 1995	Southampton	A	0–6	15,075	

=== League Cup ===
Round	Date	Opponent	Venue	Result	Attendance	Goalscorers
R1 First Leg	16 August 1994	Fulham	H	1–1	3,287	Oakes
R1 Second Leg	23 August 1994	Fulham	A	1–1 (lost 3–4 on pens)	5,134	Marshall

== Squad ==
Note: Flags indicate national team as defined under FIFA eligibility rules; some limited exceptions apply. Players may hold more than one non-FIFA nationality.

No.	Pos.	Nation	Player
—	GK	(England) ENG	Kelvin Davis
—	GK	(United States) USA	Juergen Sommer
—	GK	(England) ENG	Fred Barber
—	DF	(England) ENG	Richard Harvey
—	DF	(Scotland) SCO	Paul Telfer
—	DF	(England) ENG	Marvin Johnson
—	DF	(England) ENG	Mitchell Thomas
—	DF	(England) ENG	Julian James
—	DF	(England) ENG	Trevor Peake
—	DF	(England) ENG	Des Linton
—	DF	(Republic of Ireland) IRL	David Greene
—	MF	(England) ENG	David Preece
—	MF	(Wales) WAL	Ceri Hughes
—	MF	(England) ENG	Scott Oakes
—	MF	(Republic of Ireland) IRL	Gary Waddock

No.	Pos.	Nation	Player
—	MF	(England) ENG	Paul McLaren
—	MF	(England) ENG	Scott Houghton
—	MF	(England) ENG	Paul Allen (on loan from Southampton)
—	MF	(England) ENG	Martin Williams
—	MF	(England) ENG	Rob Matthews
—	MF	(England) ENG	Aaron Skelton
—	FW	(Jamaica) JAM	Dwight Marshall
—	FW	(Scotland) SCO	Wayne Biggins (on loan from Stoke City)
—	FW	(England) ENG	Tony Thorpe
—	FW	(England) ENG	John Taylor
—	FW	(Wales) WAL	John Hartson
—	FW	(England) ENG	Kerry Dixon
—	FW	(Canada) CAN	Geoff Aunger
—	FW	(England) ENG	Tony Adcock
—	FW	(England) ENG	Jamie Woodsford

== Player details ==
Players arranged in alphabetical order by surname.

Pos.	Name	League		Cup		Total	
Pos.	Name	Apps	Goals	Apps	Goals	Apps	Goals
FW	(England) Tony Adcock	0 (2)	0	(1)	0	(3)	0
MF	(England) Paul Allen	4	0	0	0	4	0
FW	(Scotland) Wayne Biggins	6 (1)	1	2	1	8 (1)	2
DF	(England) Ben Chenery	0	0	1	0	1	0
GK	(England) Kelvin Davis	9	0	0	0	9	0
FW	(England) Kerry Dixon	23 (5)	7	4 (1)	0	27 (6)	7
DF	(England) David Greene	7 (1)	0	2	0	9 (1)	0
FW	(Wales) John Hartson	11 (9)	5	1	1	12 (9)	6
DF	(England) Richard Harvey	9 (3)	1	0	0	9 (3)	1
MF	(England) Scott Houghton	1	0	1	0	2	0
MF	(Wales) Ceri Hughes	8 (1)	2	2	0	10 (1)	2
DF	(England) Julian James	42	3	4	0	46	3
DF	(England) Marvin Johnson	46	1	6	0	52	1
DF	(England) Des Linton	5 (5)	0	1 (1)	0	6 (6)	0
FW	(Jamaica) Dwight Marshall	36 (9)	11	5 (1)	2	41 (10)	13
FW	(England) Rob Matthews	6 (5)	0	0	0	6 (5)	0
FW	(England) Scott Oakes	37 (6)	9	5 (1)	1	42 (7)	10
DF	(England) Trevor Peake	46	0	6	0	52	0
MF	(England) David Preece	42	4	6	0	48	4
MF	(England) Aaron Skelton	3 (2)	0	0 (1)	0	3 (3)	0
GK	(United States) Juergen Sommer	37	0	6	0	43	0
FW	(England) John Taylor	9	3	0	0	9	3
MF	(Scotland) Paul Telfer	45 (1)	9	6	0	51 (1)	9
DF	(England) Mitchell Thomas	33 (2)	0	4	0	37 (2)	0
FW	(England) Tony Thorpe	0 (4)	0	0 (1)	0	0 (5)	0
MF	(Republic of Ireland) Gary Waddock	40	1	4	0	44	1
FW	(England) Martin Williams	0 (2)	0	0 (1)	0	0 (3)	0
FW	(England) Jamie Woodsford	1 (6)	0	0	0	1 (6)	0
