= 1990–91 Luton Town F.C. season =

English football club season

Luton Town F.C.
1990–91 season
- Manager: Jimmy Ryan
- Stadium: Kenilworth Road
- First Division: 18th
- FA Cup: Fourth round
- Football League Cup: Second round
- Full Members' Cup: Semi-finals
- Top goalscorer: League: All: Lars Elstrup (18)

During the 1990–91 English football season, Luton Town F.C. competed in the Football League First Division. They finished the season in 18th place, but avoided relegation due to an expansion of the First Division from 20 to 22 clubs for the following season, securing Luton a 10th successive season of First Division football. Manager Jimmy Ryan was dismissed shortly afterwards to make way for the returning David Pleat, who had previously been in charge from 1978 to 1986.

== Squad ==
Note: Flags indicate national team as defined under FIFA eligibility rules; some limited exceptions apply. Players may hold more than one non-FIFA nationality.

Pos.	Nation	Player
GK	ENG	Alec Chamberlain
GK	AUS	Andy Petterson
DF	ENG	John Dreyer
DF	ENG	Richard Harvey
DF	ENG	Matt Jackson
DF	ENG	Marvin Johnson
DF	ENG	Julian James
DF	SCO	Dave Beaumont
DF	SCO	Graham Rodger
DF	SCO	Darren Salton
DF	SCO	Paul Telfer
MF	ENG	Darron McDonough
MF	ENG	David Preece

Pos.	Nation	Player
MF	WAL	Ceri Hughes
MF	WAL	Mark Pembridge
MF	WAL	Jason Rees
MF	NIR	Kingsley Black
MF	NIR	Danny Wilson
FW	ENG	Mick Harford
FW	ENG	Sean Farrell
FW	ENG	Brian Stein
FW	WAL	Kurt Nogan
FW	NIR	Iain Dowie
FW	NIR	Paul Gray
FW	DEN	Lars Elstrup

== Table ==
=== First Division ===
Pos	Team	Pld	W	D	L	GF	GA	GD	Pts	Qualification or relegation
16	Coventry City	38	11	11	16	42	49	−7	44	
17	Aston Villa	38	9	14	15	46	58	−12	41	
18	Luton Town	38	10	7	21	42	61	−19	37	
19	Sunderland (R)	38	8	10	20	38	60	−22	34	Relegation to the Second Division
20	Derby County (R)	38	5	9	24	37	75	−38	24	Relegation to the Second Division

Source: World Football
Rules for classification: 1) Points; 2) Goal difference; 3) Goals scored
(R) Relegated

== Results ==
=== First Division ===
19 August 1990 1	Luton Town	1–1	Crystal Palace	Luton
	Dowie 45'		Young 15'	Stadium: Kenilworth Road; Attendance: 9,583

29 August 1990 2	Arsenal	2–1	Luton Town	London
	Merson 36'; Thomas 68'		Elstrup 12'	Stadium: Highbury; Attendance: 32,723

1 September 1990 3	Southampton	1–2	Luton Town	Southampton
	Rideout 32'		Elstrup 18', 26'	Stadium: The Dell; Attendance: 13,538

4 September 1990 4	Luton Town	0–1	Manchester United	Luton
			Robins 23'; Bruce (red card) 39'	Stadium: Kenilworth Road; Attendance: 12,576

8 September 1990 5	Luton Town	1–0	Leeds United	Luton
	Black 5'			Stadium: Kenilworth Road; Attendance: 10,185

15 September 1990 6	Queens Park Rangers	6–1	Luton Town	London
	Wegerle 6', 62'; Sinton 48'; Wilkins 55'; Falco 65'; Parker 85'		Hughes 57'	Stadium: Loftus Road; Attendance: 10,196

22 September 1990 7	Luton Town	1–0	Coventry City	Luton
	Dowie 2'			Stadium: Kenilworth Road; Attendance: 8,336

29 September 1990 8	Norwich City	1–3	Luton Town	Norwich
	Gordon 5'		Elstrup 48', 53', 62'	Stadium: Carrow Road; Attendance: 12,794

20 October 1990 9	Sunderland	2–0	Luton Town	Sunderland
	Gabbiadini 12'; Davenport 31'			Stadium: Roker Park; Attendance: 20,025

27 October 1990 10	Luton Town	1–1	Everton	Luton
	Elstrup 24'		Nevin 51'	Stadium: Kenilworth Road; Attendance: 10,047

3 November 1990 11	Derby County	2–1	Luton Town	Derby
	Saunders 31' (pen.); Callaghan 65'		Black 48'	Stadium: Baseball Ground; Attendance: 15,008

10 November 1990 12	Liverpool	4–0	Luton Town	Liverpool
	Rush 5', 39'; Mølby 9' (pen.); Beardsley 71'			Stadium: Anfield; Attendance: 35,207

17 November 1990 13	Luton Town	2–2	Manchester City	Luton
	Dowie 77'; Dreyer 89' (pen.)		White 25'; Redmond 42'	Stadium: Kenilworth Road; Attendance: 9,564

24 November 1990 14	Luton Town	2–0	Aston Villa	Luton
	Black 44'; Elstrup 85'			Stadium: Kenilworth Road; Attendance: 10,071

1 December 1990 15	Nottingham Forest	2–2	Luton Town	Nottingham
	Carr 6'; Clough 75'		Elstrup 15', 46'	Stadium: City Ground; Attendance: 16,498

8 December 1990 16	Luton Town	1–1	Arsenal	Luton
	Dreyer 72' (pen.)		Smith 44'; Adams (red card) 56'	Stadium: Kenilworth Road; Attendance: 12,056

16 December 1990 17	Crystal Palace	1–0	Luton Town	London
	Bright 23'			Stadium: Selhurst Park; Attendance: 15,579

22 December 1990 18	Tottenham Hotspur	2–1	Luton Town	London
	Nayim (red card) 30'; Van Den Hauwe (red card) 39'Stewart 34', 57'		Dowie 12'; Hughes (red card) 60'	Stadium: White Hart Lane; Attendance: 27,007

26 December 1990 19	Luton Town	0–1	Sheffield United	Luton
			Deane 71'	Stadium: Kenilworth Road; Attendance: 10,004

29 December 1990 20	Luton Town	2–0	Chelsea	Luton
	Cundy 55' (o.g.); Black 84'			Stadium: Kenilworth Road; Attendance: 11,050

1 January 1991 21	Wimbledon	2–0	Luton Town	London
	Fashanu 44'; Cork 83'			Stadium: Plough Lane; Attendance: 4,521

12 January 1991 22	Luton Town	3–4	Southampton	Luton
	Elstrup 24'; James 26'; Dreyer 76' (pen.)		Wallace 10', 62'; Le Tissier 28', 46'	Stadium: Kenilworth Road; Attendance: 9,021

19 January 1991 23	Leeds United	2–1	Luton Town	Leeds
	Strachan 13' (pen.); Fairclough 59'		Elstrup 67'	Stadium: Elland Road; Attendance: 27,010

2 February 1991 24	Luton Town	1–2	Queens Park Rangers	Luton
	Black 16'		Ferdinand 56', 90'	Stadium: Kenilworth Road; Attendance: 8,479

23 February 1991 25	Luton Town	3–1	Liverpool	Luton
	Black 47'; Dowie 55', 90'		Mølby 15' (pen.)	Stadium: Kenilworth Road; Attendance: 12,032

2 March 1991 26	Luton Town	1–0	Nottingham Forest	Luton
	Dowie 85'			Stadium: Kenilworth Road; Attendance: 9,577

5 March 1991 27	Manchester City	3–0	Luton Town	Manchester
	Quinn 21', 41'; Allen 31' (pen.)			Stadium: Maine Road; Attendance: 20,404

9 March 1991 28	Aston Villa	1–2	Luton Town	Birmingham
	Cascarino 69'		Mountfield 27' (o.g.); Pembridge 45'	Stadium: Villa Park; Attendance: 20,587

13 March 1991 29	Coventry City	2–1	Luton Town	Coventry
	Borrows 61' (pen.); Preece 83'		Rodger 11'	Stadium: Highfield Road; Attendance: 9,521

16 March 1991 30	Luton Town	0–1	Norwich City	Luton
			Sherwood 21'	Stadium: Kenilworth Road; Attendance: 8,604

23 March 1991 31	Manchester United	4–1	Luton Town	Manchester
	Bruce 7', 47'; Robins 70'; McClair 86'		Preece 34'	Stadium: Old Trafford; Attendance: 41,752

30 March 1991 32	Sheffield United	2–1	Luton Town	Sheffield
	Bryson 55'; Hodges 58'		Elstrup 10'	Stadium: Bramall Lane; Attendance: 18,487

4 April 1991 33	Luton Town	0–0	Tottenham Hotspur	Luton
				Stadium: Kenilworth Road; Attendance: 11,322

6 April 1991 34	Chelsea	3–3	Luton Town	London
	Le Saux 30'; Stuart 55'; Wise 67' (pen.)		Elstrup 14'; Farrell 17'; Black 23'	Stadium: Stamford Bridge; Attendance: 12,603

13 April 1991 35	Luton Town	0–1	Wimbledon	Luton
			Fashanu 79'	Stadium: Kenilworth Road; Attendance: 8,219

20 April 1991 36	Luton Town	1–2	Sunderland	Luton
	Rodger 35'		Armstrong 22'; Pascoe 63'	Stadium: Kenilworth Road; Attendance: 11,157

4 May 1991 37	Everton	1–0	Luton Town	Liverpool
	Cottee 49'			Stadium: Goodison Park; Attendance: 19,809

11 May 1991 38	Luton Town	2–0	Derby County	Luton
	Harford 41' (o.g.); Elstrup 47'			Stadium: Kenilworth Road; Attendance: 12,889

=== FA Cup ===
5 January 1991 Round 3	Sheffield United	1–3	Luton Town	Sheffield
				Stadium: Bramall Lane

26 January 1991 Round 4	Luton Town	1–1	West Ham United	Luton
				Stadium: Kenilworth Road

30 January 1991 Round 4 Replay	West Ham United	5–0	Luton Town	London
				Stadium: Boleyn Ground

=== League Cup ===
25 September 1990 Round 2 Leg 1	Luton Town	1–1	Bradford City	Luton
				Stadium: Kenilworth Road; Attendance: 5,120

10 October 1990 Round 2 Leg 2	Bradford City	1–1 (a.e.t.) (2–2 agg.) (5–4 p)	Luton Town	Bradford
				Stadium: Valley Parade; Attendance: 6,180

=== Full Members' Cup ===
19 December 1990 Southern Section Round 2	Luton Town	5–1	West Ham United	Luton
				Stadium: Kenilworth Road; Attendance: 5,759

18 February 1991 Southern Section Quarter Final	Chelsea	1–1 (a.e.t.) (1–4 p)	Luton Town	London
				Stadium: Stamford Bridge; Attendance: 3,849

26 February 1991 Southern Section Semi Final	Crystal Palace	3–1	Luton Town	London
				Stadium: Selhurst Park; Attendance: 7,170

== Player details ==
Players arranged in alphabetical order by surname.

Pos.	Name	League		League Cup		FA Cup		Full Members Cup		Total	
Pos.	Name	Apps	Goals	Apps	Goals	Apps	Goals	Apps	Goals	Apps	Goals
DF	(Scotland) Dave Beaumont	29 (4)	0	2	0	1	0	2 (1)	0	33 (5)	0
MF	(England) Kingsley Black	37	7	2	1	3	1	1	1	43	10
DF	(England) Tim Breacker	8	0	1	0	0	0	0	0	9	0
GK	(England) Alec Chamberlain	38	0	2	0	3	0	3	0	46	0
FW	(England) Iain Dowie	26 (3)	7	2	0	1 (1)	0	2	0	31 (4)	7
DF	(England) John Dreyer	38	3	2	0	3	0	3	1	46	4
FW	(Denmark) Lars Elstrup	37	15	1	0	3	2	3	1	44	18
FW	(England) Sean Farrell	11 (9)	1	0	0	2 (1)	1	1 (2)	2	14 (12)	4
DF	(England) Richard Harvey	26 (3)	0	2	1	3	0	2	0	33 (3)	1
MF	(England) Paul Holsgrove	0 (1)	0	0	0	0	0	0	0	0 (1)	0
MF	(Wales) Ceri Hughes	17	1	2	0	0	0	0	0	19	1
DF	(England) Julian James	10 (7)	1	1 (1)	0	3	0	2 (1)	0	16 (9)	1
DF	(England) Marvin Johnson	24 (3)	0	0 (1)	0	0 (1)	0	2	0	26 (5)	0
MF	(England) Darron McDonough	21 (5)	0	0	0	3	0	1	0	25 (5)	0
FW	(Wales) Kurt Nogan	1 (8)	0	1 (1)	0	0	0	0 (1)	0	2 (10)	0
MF	(Wales) Mark Pembridge	18	1	0	0	3	0	3	0	24	1
MF	(England) David Preece	37	1	2	0	3	0	2	0	44	2
MF	(Wales) Jason Rees	11 (10)	0	1 (1)	0	0 (1)	0	2	2	14 (12)	2
DF	(Scotland) Graham Rodger	14	2	0	0	0	0	2	0	16	2
DF	(England) Steve Williams	15 (1)	0	1	0	2	0	1	0	19 (1)	0

== See also ==
- List of Luton Town F.C. seasons
- 1990–91 Football League
- 1990–91 FA Cup
