= 1996–97 Luton Town F.C. season =

English football club season

Luton Town
1996–97 season
- Chairman: David Kohler
- Manager: Lennie Lawrence
- Stadium: Kenilworth Road
- Second Division: 3rd
- Play-offs: Semi-finals
- FA Cup: Third round
- League Cup: Third round
- Football League Trophy: Second round
- Top goalscorer: League: Thorpe (28); All: Thorpe (32)
- Average home league attendance: 6,781

During the 1996–97 English football season, Luton Town F.C. competed in the Football League Second Division.

== Season summary ==
In the 1996–97 season, Luton started just as badly as the last, with three straight defeats. However, the introduction of young forward Andrew Fotiadis saw Luton burst into life, as they shot up the table with a run of eight wins and two draws in eleven games. Tony Thorpe, too, proved to be a revelation, scoring 28 goals to become the division's top scorer. Luton were nearly promoted, but finished in third place, four points off automatic promotion and then lost to Crewe Alexandra in the play-offs.

== Final league table ==
Pos	Team	Pld	W	D	L	GF	GA	GD	Pts	Promotion or relegation
1	Bury (C, P)	46	24	12	10	62	38	+24	84	Promotion to the First Division
2	Stockport County (P)	46	23	13	10	59	41	+18	82	Promotion to the First Division
3	Luton Town	46	21	15	10	71	45	+26	78	Qualification for the Second Division play-offs
4	Brentford	46	20	14	12	56	43	+13	74	Qualification for the Second Division play-offs
5	Bristol City	46	21	10	15	69	51	+18	73	Qualification for the Second Division play-offs

Rules for classification: In the Football League goals scored (GF) takes precedence over goal difference (GD).
(C) Champions; (P) Promoted

== Results ==
Luton Town's score comes first

=== Legend ===
Win	Draw	Loss

=== FA Cup ===
Round	Date	Opponent	Venue	Result	Attendance	Goalscorers
R1	16 November 1996	Torquay United	A	1–0	3,450	Hughes
R2	7 December 1996	Boreham Wood	H	2–1	5,332	Marshall (2)
R3	21 January 1997	Bolton Wanderers	H	1–1	7,414	Johnson
R3R	25 January 1997	Bolton Wanderers	A	2–6	9,713	Thorpe (2)

=== League Cup ===
Round	Date	Opponent	Venue	Result	Attendance	Goalscorers
R1 1st Leg	20 August 1996	Bristol Rovers	H	3–0	2,643	Grant, Thorpe (pen), Oldfield
R1 2nd Leg	3 September 1996	Bristol Rovers	A	1–2 (won 4–2 on agg)	2,320	Oldfield
R2 1st Leg	17 September 1996	Derby County	H	1–0	4,459	James
R2 2nd Leg	24 September 1996	Derby County	A	2–2 (won 3–2 on agg)	13,569	Grant, Thorpe
R3	22 October 1996	Wimbledon	A	1–1	5,043	Hughes
R3R	12 November 1996	Wimbledon	H	1–2 (a.e.t.)	8,076	Blackwell (own goal)

=== Football League Trophy ===
Round	Date	Opponent	Venue	Result	Attendance	Goalscorers
SR1	10 December 1996	Leyton Orient	H	2–1	1,594	
SR2	4 February 1997	Northampton Town	A	0–1	4,201	

== Squad ==
Note: Flags indicate national team as defined under FIFA eligibility rules; some limited exceptions apply. Players may hold more than one non-FIFA nationality.

No.	Pos.	Nation	Player
—	GK	(England) ENG	Nathan Abbey
—	GK	(England) ENG	Kelvin Davis
—	GK	(United States) USA	Ian Feuer
—	DF	(Scotland) SCO	Graham Alexander
—	DF	(England) ENG	Ben Chenery
—	DF	(England) ENG	Steve Davis
—	DF	(England) ENG	Richard Harvey
—	DF	(England) ENG	Julian James
—	DF	(England) ENG	Marvin Johnson
—	DF	(England) ENG	Des Linton
—	DF	(England) ENG	Gavin McGowan (on loan from Arsenal)
—	DF	(Northern Ireland) NIR	Darren Patterson
—	DF	(England) ENG	Trevor Peake
—	DF	(England) ENG	Aaron Skelton
—	DF	(England) ENG	Mitchell Thomas
—	DF	(England) ENG	Matthew Upson

No.	Pos.	Nation	Player
—	DF	(England) ENG	Chris Willmott
—	MF	(England) ENG	Sean Evers
—	MF	(Bulgaria) BUL	Boncho Genchev
—	MF	(Wales) WAL	Ceri Hughes
—	MF	(England) ENG	Paul McLaren
—	MF	(England) ENG	David Oldfield
—	MF	(England) ENG	Paul Showler
—	MF	(Republic of Ireland) IRL	Gary Waddock
—	FW	(England) ENG	Stuart Douglas
—	FW	(England) ENG	Andrew Fotiadis
—	FW	(Republic of Ireland) IRL	Liam George
—	FW	(Ghana) GHA	Kim Grant
—	FW	(England) ENG	Andy Kiwomya (on loan from Bradford City)
—	FW	(Jamaica) JAM	Dwight Marshall
—	FW	(England) ENG	John Taylor
—	FW	(England) ENG	Tony Thorpe

== Player details ==
Players arranged in alphabetical order by surname.

Pos.	Name	League		Cup		Playoffs		Total	
Pos.	Name	Apps	Goals	Apps	Goals	Apps	Goals	Apps	Goals
DF	(Scotland) Graham Alexander	44 (1)	2	11 (1)	0	2	0	57 (2)	3
GK	(England) Kelvin Davis	0	0	1	0	0	0	1	0
DF	(England) Steve Davis	43 (1)	8	12	1	2	0	57 (1)	9
FW	(England) Stuart Douglas	2 (7)	0	1 (1)	0	0	0	3 (8)	0
MF	(England) Sean Evers	1	0	1	0	0	0	2	0
GK	(United States) Ian Feuer	46	0	11	0	2	0	59	0
FW	(England) Andrew Fotiadis	9 (8)	3	0 (4)	0	1 (1)	0	10 (13)	3
MF	(Bulgaria) Boncho Genchev	15 (12)	1	6 (4)	0	0	0	21 (16)	1
FW	(Ghana) Kim Grant	8 (17)	2	6 (2)	3	0 (1)	0	14 (20)	5
DF	(England) Richard Harvey	1 (1)	0	0	0	0	0	1 (1)	0
MF	(Wales) Ceri Hughes	36	4	12	2	0	0	48	6
DF	(England) Julian James	44	1	11	1	1	0	56	2
DF	(England) Marvin Johnson	44	0	10	1	1	0	55	1
FW	(England) Andy Kiwomya	5	1	0	0	0	0	5	1
DF	(England) Des Linton	3 (4)	0	4	0	0	0	7 (4)	0
FW	(Jamaica) Dwight Marshall	9 (15)	4	5 (1)	3	0 (2)	0	14 (18)	7
DF	(England) Gavin McGowan	2	0	0	0	0	0	2	0
FW	(England) Paul McLaren	13 (11)	0	0 (1)	0	2	0	15 (12)	0
MF	(England) David Oldfield	31 (7)	6	5 (2)	2	2	3	38 (9)	11
DF	(Northern Ireland) Darren Patterson	8 (2)	0	3 (1)	0	2	0	13 (3)	0
MF	(England) Paul Showler	21 (2)	6	7 (2)	0	1	0	29 (4)	6
MF	(England) Aaron Skelton	2 (1)	0	3	0	0	0	5 (1)	0
DF	(England) Mitchell Thomas	42	3	9	0	2	0	53	3
FW	(England) Tony Thorpe	39 (2)	28	6 (1)	3	2	0	48 (3)	31
DF	(England) Matthew Upson	0 (1)	0	0	0	0	0	0 (1)	0
MF	(Republic of Ireland) Gary Waddock	38 (1)	2	8	0	2	0	48 (1)	2
