= Paul Telfer =

Paul Telfer is the name of:

- Paul Telfer (footballer) (born 1971), Scottish footballer
- Paul Telfer (actor) (born 1979), Scottish actor
