= John Dreyer =

John Dreyer may refer to:

- John Louis Emil Dreyer, Danish-Irish astronomer
- John Dreyer (footballer), English footballer and manager
