= Graham Alexander =

Football manager and former player (born 1971)

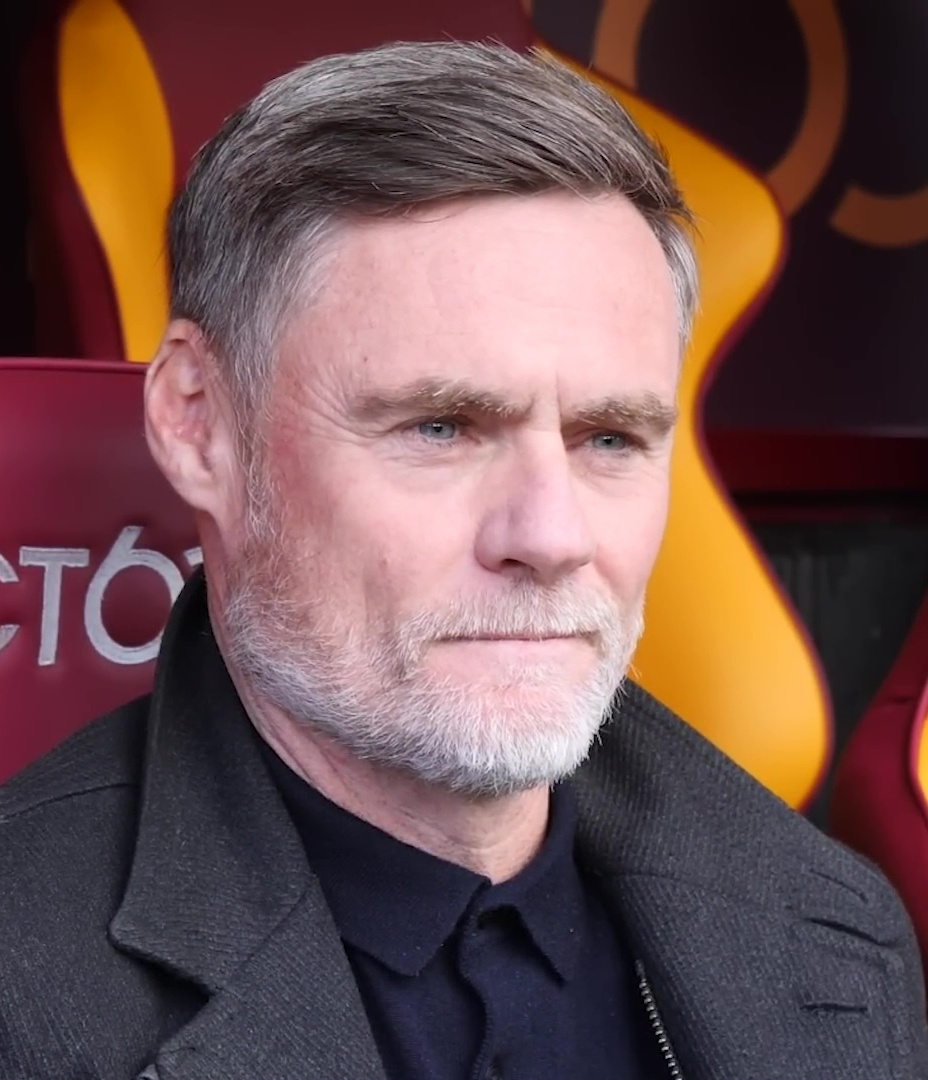
- Alexander in 2023

Personal information
- Full name: Graham Alexander
- Date of birth: 10 October 1971 (age 55)
- Place of birth: Coventry, England
- Height: 5 ft 10 in (1.78 m)
- Positions: Right-back; defensive midfielder

Team information
- Current team: Preston North End (manager)

Youth career
- 1988–1990: Scunthorpe United

Senior career*
| Years | Team | Apps | (Gls) |
| 1988–1995 | Scunthorpe United | 159 | (18) |
| 1995–1999 | Luton Town | 150 | (15) |
| 1999–2007 | Preston North End | 352 | (52) |
| 2007–2011 | Burnley | 154 | (20) |
| 2011–2012 | Preston North End | 18 | (2) |
| Total | | 833 | (107) |

International career
| 2002–2009 | Scotland | 40 | (0) |

Managerial career
- 2011–2012: Preston North End (caretaker)
- 2012–2015: Fleetwood Town
- 2016–2018: Scunthorpe United
- 2018–2020: Salford City
- 2021–2022: Motherwell
- 2023: Milton Keynes Dons
- 2023–2026: Bradford City
- 2026–: Preston North End
- * Club domestic league appearances and goals

Graham Alexander (born 10 October 1971) is a professional football manager and former player who manages EFL Championship club Preston North End. In a lengthy playing career, he represented Scunthorpe United, Luton Town, Preston North End and Burnley. Born in England, he made 40 international appearances for Scotland.

For most of his career, Alexander played as a specialist at right-back, but was also deployed as a defensive midfielder early on in his career. He is the eighth-oldest player to score in Premier League history. He was also a penalty kick specialist. On 16 April 2011, in Burnley's win over Swansea City in a Championship match, Alexander became only the second outfield player in English football history to have made 1,000 professional appearances, after Tony Ford. He is third on the list of footballers in England by number of league appearances.

Alexander was appointed manager of Fleetwood Town in December 2012. He won the 2013–14 League Two play-offs and promotion to League One, but was dismissed by Fleetwood in September 2015. He then managed Scunthorpe United for two years before being appointed manager of newly promoted National League club Salford City on 14 May 2018. Alexander guided Salford to promotion in his first season, but was dismissed in October 2020. He then had 18 months as manager of Scottish club Motherwell. He had a brief spell as manager of Milton Keynes Dons before being appointed manager of Bradford City in November 2023. He oversaw Bradford's promotion to the third tier in 2025 and returned to Preston North End in September 2026, leaving Bradford top of League One at the time.

== Club career ==
=== Early career ===
Alexander began his career in the late 1980s as a youth player with Scunthorpe United. He made his first-team debut on 27 April 1991, coming on as a substitute for Mark Hine, and signed his first professional contract the same year. In 1991–92, he established himself as a member of Scunthorpe's first team, usually playing at right half.

=== Luton Town ===
Alexander made over 200 appearances at Scunthorpe before moving to Luton Town for a transfer fee of £100,000. He went on to make a similar number of appearances with Luton in his four years with the club.

=== Preston North End ===
In 1999 two clubs were vying for his signature; Burnley and Preston North End. Both clubs made offers for the player but Alexander opted for a move to Preston. He became a first team regular at Deepdale, eventually club captain and an established set-piece taker, particularly in penalties. Alexander stayed remarkably fit during his career, rarely suffering a major injury. However, during the 2000–01 season, he missed several weeks of the season after breaking his rib in an away match against Wolverhampton Wanderers. During his eight years at Preston, Alexander made exactly 400 appearances for the club, with his 400th and final match coming against Colchester United on 25 August 2007. He was also in the PFA's Championship Team of the Season for 2004–05

During the summer of 2007 a number of clubs were linked with him including Crystal Palace who had a £50,000 bid turned down by Preston, who said: "He is club captain and a vital member of this squad and certainly not a player we will allow to leave."

=== Burnley ===
On 29 August 2007, he made a surprise move to local rivals Burnley almost nine years after they had originally tried to sign him. The reasons cited for his departure were that Preston would not extend his contract by another year, so when offered a two-year contract by Burnley the player accepted and made a £200,000 move to Turf Moor. Preston chairman Derek Shaw did not want to lose the player and said:

We don't particularly want to sell Graham but he has the comfort of a two-year contract at Burnley whereas he only has one year here at Deepdale. We quite possibly would have renewed Graham's contract, he's a fit man.

The £200,000 transfer money was made up of £100,000 payable in 2007 and the final £100,000 payable in the summer of 2008.

In Burnley's promotion season in 2008–09 Alexander at the age of 37 played in all 61 league and cup games ending with the 1–0 play-off final victory over Sheffield United at Wembley which took Burnley back to the top flight of English football for the first time in 33 years.

On 29 June 2009, Alexander signed a new one-year contract at Burnley, and on 15 August he became the oldest player to make a Premier League debut. On 19 September, he scored his first Premier League goal, a penalty, in a 3–1 win at home to Sunderland. On 31 October 2009, He scored both goals in a 2–0 home win against Hull City. A week later he then scored the first for Burnley, from the spot, at Manchester City in a thrilling 3–3 draw. On 16 December, he scored his 100th league goal. He scored an equaliser against Arsenal, sending Gunners 'keeper Manuel Almunia the wrong way. On 10 April 2010, Alexander again scored twice against Hull City – both penalties – in a 4–1 win to take his tally for the season to eight, seven of which were penalties. Alexander took penalties in an unusual way, opting to use the outside of his foot rather than the inside. On 6 May 2010, he was named Burnley's Player of the Year for the 2009–10 season.

On 5 August 2010, Burnley's first team manager, Brian Laws, named the 38-year-old as club captain for the 2010–11 season. On Alexander's appointment, Laws said "Graham is the consummate professional who has been instrumental in the success that this club has seen in the past few seasons, so it was an easy choice."

In April 2011, Alexander made his 1,000th senior appearance for club and country in a 2–1 win against Swansea City as an 87th-minute substitute. Only Tony Ford has matched this feat as an outfield player. At the end of the season, Alexander looked likely to leave Turf Moor, as he was linked with managerial jobs with Bury and Macclesfield Town, but Burnley boss Eddie Howe stated that he was still part of his plans for the following season. On 4 July 2011, Alexander was released by Burnley.

=== Return to Preston North End ===
Alexander returned to Preston North End on 3 August 2011, as he signed a one-year contract with the club. He made his debut against Colchester United.

Alexander scored his first goal for Preston in four years with a trademark penalty in a 2–1 home win against Tranmere on 24 September 2011. This was after his first penalty back in a Preston shirt was saved by Exeter's Artur Krysiak, and before his third was saved by Lee Butcher of Leyton Orient. His next penalty came in a penalty shootout against Rochdale in the Football League Trophy, which was slotted into the top corner after he was brought on as a substitute for Conor McLaughlin especially to take a penalty in the shootout. However, he missed his next penalty, again in the Football League Trophy, and again in a penalty shootout, this time against Chesterfield. He was the third Preston player to take a penalty in this shootout, and he blazed it over the bar. Preston's next penalty-taker, Paul Coutts, had his penalty saved, and then when the next penalty was scored by Chesterfield's Alexandre Mendy, Preston were knocked out of the tournament. Alexander started the next league game against Stevenage but was replaced through injury by Steven Smith after just 3 minutes, after which Alexander did not feature for the Lilywhites for a long time, and there was speculation that he had played his last game for Preston, and in his career.

After the dismissal of Phil Brown a few games down the line, Alexander became joint-caretaker manager, alongside David Unsworth. His first match in joint-charge was an away match against MK Dons, which they won 1–0. Just before what was to be an ordinary match against Wycombe Wanderers, it was announced that Graham Westley would replace them at the helm of Preston, and that Wycombe was to be the last match in charge for the pairing of Alexander and Unsworth. They won the match 3–2.

Playing his final game on 28 April 2012 against Charlton Athletic, Alexander came on as a substitute for Max Ehmer in the 84th minute. This was supposed to be a cameo appearance to allow the Preston supporters to show their appreciation of his service to the club. However, with Preston losing 1–2 in stoppage time, they were awarded a free-kick 25 yards from Charlton's goal. Alexander stepped up to curl the ball around the wall and inside the near post, scoring with the final kick of his career. His final senior goal helped him to hold the record of "highest-scoring British defender" for almost 12 years before his career tally was surpassed by James Tavernier in March 2024.

On 20 June 2012, Alexander was appointed Head of Youth Development. Chairman Peter Ridsdale said: "He's got over 1,000 games under his belt, he's a hero here and what better person to head our youth development."

== International career ==
Born in England to a Scottish father and Irish mother, Alexander was eligible to play for England, the Republic of Ireland or Scotland. Before his first international call, Alexander said, "To be honest, since I started playing football, I've had two ambitions: to play in the Premier League, and to play for Scotland. I've been brought up supporting Scotland as far back as I can remember." This ambition was fulfilled when he made his Scotland debut on 17 April 2002 in a 2–1 friendly defeat to Nigeria at Pittodrie Stadium.

Alexander was part of the Scotland squad who won the annual Japanese Kirin Cup tournament in 2006, defeating Bulgaria 5–1 before drawing 0–0 with Japan. He gained his 25th Scotland cap in a 1–0 home victory against France. He gained a total of 40 caps for Scotland. Alexander was shown only one yellow card while playing for Scotland, against New Zealand in May 2003.

== Managerial career ==
=== Fleetwood Town ===
On 6 December 2012, Alexander was appointed as the new manager of League Two club Fleetwood Town. Upon his arrival, Fleetwood were sat in seventh place in the league, though had recently been eliminated from the FA Cup by Aldershot Town.

In his second season in charge, Alexander guided Fleetwood to promotion by winning the promotion play-offs, but was subsequently dismissed in September 2015, following a poor start to their 2015–16 campaign in League One.

=== Scunthorpe United ===
On 22 March 2016, Alexander was appointed as the new manager of League One side Scunthorpe United. In his first full season in charge, Alexander guided the club to qualification for the promotion play-offs where they suffered a 3–2 aggregate defeat to eventual champions Millwall.

On 24 March 2018, it was confirmed that Alexander had parted ways with Scunthorpe after two years in association with the club; his side had gone eight games without a win, though left the club sat in fifth place.

=== Salford City ===
On 14 May 2018, Alexander was appointed as the new manager of newly promoted National League club Salford City, signing onto a four-year contract, following the departures of previous joint-managers Bernard Morley and Anthony Johnson. In his first season in charge, Alexander guided Salford to qualification for the promotion play-offs, in which they recorded a narrow 4–3 penalty success over Eastleigh, having drawn the match 1–1, to reach the final at Wembley Stadium, where they were 3–0 victorious over AFC Fylde to reach promotion to League Two.

During his second season in charge, Alexander guided Salford to the final of the EFL Trophy, though the final of the competition (which was initially scheduled to take place on 4 April 2020) was postponed due to the COVID-19 pandemic, which also resulted in the league season to be postponed. In May 2020, clubs of League Two and League One voted to end the season prematurely, with the final standings being decided in a points-per-game format, which resulted in Salford finishing in eleventh place. Alexander was dismissed by the club on 12 October following a 2–2 at home to Tranmere Rovers which left the club fifth in the league and unbeaten in the opening five games, with Paul Scholes immediately announced as his replacement.

Salford City co-owner Gary Neville later admitted that the dismissal of Alexander was a mistake, stating: "Graham Alexander should have never left this club last season. I should have never made that decision that I made".

=== Motherwell ===
On 7 January 2021, Alexander was announced as the new head coach of Scottish Premiership side Motherwell, following the departure of Stephen Robinson and replacing interim manager Keith Lasley. His first game in charge of Motherwell was a 1–1 draw against St Mirren in Paisley. On 10 January 2022, Alexander extended his contract with the club until 2025. Motherwell managed to finish fifth in the 2021–22 Scottish Premiership, despite only winning five games after the winter break. Alexander left the club by mutual consent on 29 July 2022, following their elimination from the Europa Conference League by Sligo Rovers.

=== Milton Keynes Dons ===
On 27 May 2023, Alexander was appointed head coach of recently relegated EFL League Two club Milton Keynes Dons. His tenure started well; on 8 September 2023 Alexander was named the EFL League Two Manager of the Month for August 2023 after the club finished the month top of the table with twelve points from their opening five games. However, following a run of eight league games without a win, on 16 October 2023, Milton Keynes Dons dismissed Alexander after just 16 games in charge of the club.

=== Bradford City ===
On 6 November 2023, Alexander was appointed manager of League Two club Bradford City on a deal until June 2026.

Alexander was named League Two Manager of the Month for February 2025 after thirteen points from six matches saw the Bantams move into second place. On 3 May 2025, Alexander achieved promotion into League One with Bradford City following a dramatic goal by Antoni Sarcevic in the 96th-minute on the final day of the season.

In July 2025, Graham Alexander and assistant Chris Lucketti signed a three year contract extension, intending to keep them at the club until the summer of 2028; however, on 24 September 2026, with Bradford top of League One, the club accepted an approach by Preston North End to speak to Alexander about their managerial vacancy.

=== Preston North End ===
On 28 September 2026, Alexander was announced as the new manager of Preston North End, with Chris Lucketti joining him as assistant manager.

== Career statistics ==
=== Club ===
Appearances and goals by club, season and competition
| Club | Season | League | | | FA Cup | | League Cup | | Other | | Total | |
| Club | Season | Division | Apps | Goals | Apps | Goals | Apps | Goals | Apps | Goals | Apps | Goals |
|---|---|---|---|---|---|---|---|---|---|---|---|---|
| Scunthorpe United | 1988–89 | Fourth Division | 0 | 0 | 0 | 0 | 0 | 0 | 1 (Note: Appearance(s) in Football League Trophy) | 0 | 1 | 0 |
| Scunthorpe United | 1989–90 | Fourth Division | 0 | 0 | 0 | 0 | 0 | 0 | 1 | 0 | 1 | 0 |
| Scunthorpe United | 1990–91 | Fourth Division | 1 | 0 | 0 | 0 | 0 | 0 | 0 | 0 | 1 | 0 |
| Scunthorpe United | 1991–92 | Fourth Division | 36 | 5 | 2 | 0 | 4 | 1 | 5 (Note: Three appearances and one goal in Football League Trophy, two appearances in Fourth Division play-offs) | 1 | 47 | 7 |
| Scunthorpe United | 1992–93 | Third Division | 41 | 5 | 2 | 0 | 4 | 1 | 4 | 1 | 51 | 7 |
| Scunthorpe United | 1993–94 | Third Division | 41 | 4 | 4 | 0 | 2 | 0 | 4 | 0 | 51 | 4 |
| Scunthorpe United | 1994–95 | Third Division | 40 | 4 | 4 | 1 | 2 | 0 | 2 | 1 | 48 | 6 |
| Scunthorpe United | Total | | 159 | 18 | 12 | 1 | 12 | 2 | 17 | 3 | 200 | 24 |
| Luton Town | 1995–96 | First Division | 37 | 1 | 1 | 0 | 2 | 0 | 2 (Note: Appearances in Anglo-Italian Cup) | 0 | 42 | 1 |
| Luton Town | 1996–97 | Second Division | 45 | 2 | 4 | 0 | 6 | 0 | 4 (Note: Two appearances in Football League Trophy, two in Second Division play-offs) | 0 | 59 | 2 |
| Luton Town | 1997–98 | Second Division | 39 | 8 | 1 | 0 | 2 | 0 | 2 | 0 | 44 | 8 |
| Luton Town | 1998–99 | Second Division | 29 | 4 | 2 | 0 | 7 | 2 | 0 | 0 | 38 | 6 |
| Luton Town | Total | | 150 | 15 | 8 | 0 | 17 | 2 | 8 | 0 | 183 | 17 |
| Preston North End | 1998–99 | Second Division | 10 | 0 | — | | — | | 2 (Note: Appearances in Second Division play-offs) | 0 | 12 | 0 |
| Preston North End | 1999–2000 | Second Division | 46 | 6 | 6 | 3 | 5 | 1 | 1 | 0 | 58 | 10 |
| Preston North End | 2000–01 | First Division | 34 | 5 | 0 | 0 | 4 | 2 | 3 (Note: Appearances in First Division play-offs) | 0 | 41 | 7 |
| Preston North End | 2001–02 | First Division | 45 | 6 | 3 | 1 | 2 | 0 | — | | 50 | 7 |
| Preston North End | 2002–03 | First Division | 45 | 11 | 1 | 0 | 4 | 1 | — | | 50 | 12 |
| Preston North End | 2003–04 | First Division | 45 | 9 | 3 | 0 | 1 | 0 | — | | 49 | 9 |
| Preston North End | 2004–05 | Championship | 42 | 7 | 1 | 0 | 3 | 1 | 1 (Note: Appearance(s) in Championship play-offs) | 0 | 47 | 8 |
| Preston North End | 2005–06 | Championship | 40 | 3 | 2 | 1 | 1 | 1 | 2 | 0 | 45 | 5 |
| Preston North End | 2006–07 | Championship | 42 | 6 | 3 | 0 | 0 | 0 | — | | 45 | 6 |
| Preston North End | 2007–08 | Championship | 3 | 0 | — | | — | | — | | 3 | 0 |
| Preston North End | Total | | 352 | 53 | 19 | 5 | 20 | 6 | 9 | 0 | 400 | 64 |
| Burnley | 2007–08 | Championship | 43 | 1 | 1 | 0 | 1 | 0 | — | | 45 | 1 |
| Burnley | 2008–09 | Championship | 46 | 9 | 5 | 1 | 7 | 0 | 3 | 1 | 61 | 11 |
| Burnley | 2009–10 | Premier League | 33 | 7 | 2 | 1 | 0 | 0 | — | | 35 | 8 |
| Burnley | 2010–11 | Championship | 32 | 3 | 2 | 1 | 2 | 0 | — | | 36 | 4 |
| Burnley | Total | | 154 | 20 | 10 | 3 | 10 | 0 | 3 | 1 | 177 | 24 |
| Preston North End | 2011–12 | League One | 18 | 2 | 0 | 0 | 1 | 0 | 2 | 0 | 21 | 2 |
| Career total | | | 833 | 108 | 49 | 9 | 60 | 10 | 39 | 4 | 981 | 131 |

=== International ===
Appearances and goals by national team and year
| National team | Year | Apps | Goals |
|---|---|---|---|
| Scotland | 2002 | 8 | 0 |
| Scotland | 2003 | 5 | 0 |
| Scotland | 2004 | 1 | 0 |
| Scotland | 2005 | 8 | 0 |
| Scotland | 2006 | 4 | 0 |
| Scotland | 2007 | 6 | 0 |
| Scotland | 2008 | 5 | 0 |
| Scotland | 2009 | 3 | 0 |
| Total | | 40 | 0 |

== Managerial statistics ==
As of match played 21 November 2026

Managerial record by team and tenure
| Team | From | To | Record | | | | | Ref. |
| Team | From | To | P | W | D | L | Win % | Ref. |
|---|---|---|---|---|---|---|---|---|
| Preston North End (caretaker) | 14 December 2011 | 16 January 2012 | 5 | 2 | 2 | 1 | 40.0 | |
| Fleetwood Town | 6 December 2012 | 30 September 2015 | 145 | 56 | 35 | 54 | 38.6 | |
| Scunthorpe United | 22 March 2016 | 24 March 2018 | 113 | 53 | 30 | 30 | 46.9 | |
| Salford City | 14 May 2018 | 12 October 2020 | 112 | 54 | 27 | 31 | 48.2 | |
| Motherwell | 7 January 2021 | 29 July 2022 | 69 | 26 | 16 | 27 | 37.7 | |
| Milton Keynes Dons | 27 May 2023 | 16 October 2023 | 16 | 6 | 4 | 6 | 37.5 | |
| Bradford City | 6 November 2023 | 28 September 2026 | 158 | 79 | 33 | 46 | 50.0 | |
| Preston North End | 28 September 2026 | Present | 8 | 1 | 2 | 5 | 12.5 | |
| Total | | | 626 | 277 | 149 | 200 | 44.2 | |

== Honours ==
=== Player ===
Preston

- Football League Second Division: 1999–2000

Burnley

- Football League Championship play-offs: 2009

Individual

- Scunthorpe United Player of the Year: 1993–94
- PFA Team of the Year: 1999–2000 Second Division, 2001–02 First Division, 2004–05 Championship, 2006–07 Championship
- Burnley Player of the Year: 2009–10

=== Manager ===
Fleetwood Town

- Football League Two play-offs: 2014

Salford City

- National League play-offs: 2019

Bradford City

- EFL League Two third-place promotion: 2024–25

Individual

- Football League / EFL League Two Manager of the Month: January 2014, October 2019, August 2023, February 2025
- Football / EFL League One Manager of the Month: April 2016, November 2016
- EFL League Two Manager of the Season: 2024–25

== See also ==
- List of Scotland international footballers born outside Scotland
- List of men's footballers with the most official appearances
