= John Hartson =

Welsh footballer (born 1975)

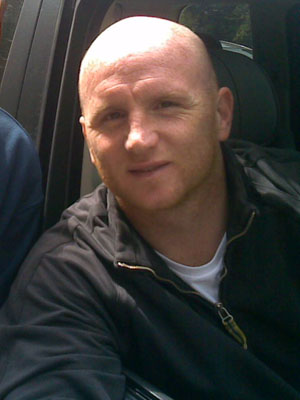
- Hartson in 2007

Personal information
- Full name: John Hartson
- Date of birth: 5 April 1975 (age 51)
- Place of birth: Swansea, Wales
- Height: 6 ft 1 in (1.85 m)
- Position: Striker

Senior career*
Years	Team	Apps	(Gls)
1992–1995	Luton Town	54	(11)
1995–1997	Arsenal	53	(14)
1997–1999	West Ham United	60	(24)
1999–2001	Wimbledon	49	(19)
2001	Coventry City	12	(6)
2001–2006	Celtic	146	(88)
2006–2008	West Bromwich Albion	21	(5)
2007	→ Norwich City (loan)	4	(0)
Total		399	(167)

International career
- Wales U21
1995–2005	Wales	51	(14)
- * Club domestic league appearances and goals

John Hartson (born 5 April 1975) is a Welsh former professional footballer, coach and sports television pundit for S4C, Sky Sports, Premier Sports TV and TNT Sports.

As a player he was a striker, notably for Scottish club Celtic where his time with the Hoops saw three Scottish Premier League titles. Hartson also played in the Premier League with Arsenal, West Ham United, Wimbledon, Coventry City and West Bromwich Albion, and in the Football League for Luton Town and Norwich City.

Hartson earned 51 international caps for Wales, scoring 14 goals. He later held the position of head coach for Wales's strikers.

== Early life ==
John Hartson was born on 5 April 1975 in Swansea, the third of four children to Cyril and Diana Hartson. Cyril had played football for local team Afan Lido. His paternal grandfather, Pius Hartson (1918–2012), was Canadian from Newfoundland and served with the Royal Navy during World War II. Hartson grew up in Talycoppa, Swansea, alongside his elder brother James, elder sister Hayley and younger sister Victoria. As a youngster Hartson represented Lonlas Boys' Club in Skewen, playing his first match aged six. He joined Luton Town's Youth Training Scheme at the age of sixteen but was suspended four months later for stealing a bank card from the son of a couple with whom he was lodging. He used the card to withdraw £50 in order to fund his gambling addiction. Hartson was suspended and sent home to Swansea but was reinstated by Luton shortly afterwards and allowed to resume his apprenticeship.

== Club career ==
=== Luton Town and Arsenal ===
Hartson turned professional in 1992 and made his Luton Town first team debut as a substitute in a 1–0 League Cup defeat to Cambridge United on 24 August 1993. In January 1995, at 19, he joined Arsenal for £2.5 million, a British record fee for a teenage player at the time. Along with Chris Kiwomya, Hartson was one of George Graham's last signings before the manager's sacking in February 1995. He made his Arsenal debut on 14 January 1995, a 1–1 home draw with Everton, and scored his first goal for the club the following week, the only goal in a 1–0 away win at Coventry City. He was a regular for the remainder of his first season, a highlight of which was scoring Arsenal's 75th-minute equaliser in the 1995 UEFA Cup Winners' Cup Final against Real Zaragoza; however a last-minute goal from 40 yards by Nayim over David Seaman meant Arsenal lost the game 2–1. He was strike-partner to Ian Wright, being favoured ahead of Kevin Campbell to fill the gap left by the injured Alan Smith, who retired at the end of the season.

Following the signing of Dennis Bergkamp, who was preferred up front to partner Wright, Hartson went on to feature under Graham's successors Bruce Rioch and Arsène Wenger. With Wenger wanting him to stay at the club, Hartson though in February 1997 linked up with West Ham United in a £3.2 million deal. At the time, he was the most expensive player to be signed by West Ham. The deal was initially reported to be worth £5 million.

In total, Hartson played 53 times for Arsenal, scoring 14 goals.

=== West Ham United ===
Hartson made his debut for West Ham on 15 February 1997 alongside another new signing, Paul Kitson. West Ham lost 1–0 to Derby County and Hartson was booked. His first West Ham goal came in his next following game on 24 February 1997, a 4–3 home win over Tottenham Hotspur. In his first season, he scored five league goals from eleven games and was instrumental in helping West Ham rise from 18th when he joined to a final league position for 1996–97 season of 14th. The next season saw Hartson finish, with 24 goals in 42 games in all competitions, as West Ham's top scorer. Hartson's goal tally was in all a considerable margin ahead of the next highest scorer, Eyal Berkovic with nine goals. In the 1998 close season, Manchester United chairman Martin Edwards and assistant manager Brian Kidd expressed their desire for Hartson to sign for Manchester United to manager Alex Ferguson. However, Ferguson decided against making a bid for Hartson. In a training ground incident in September 1998, Hartson kicked West Ham teammate Eyal Berkovic in the face, after the Israeli midfielder had punched Hartson in the leg as he attempted to help Berkovic to his feet. The incident was captured on camera. Hartson was fined and admitted in his biography that it was an error of judgement. Berkovic said of the incident "If my head had been a ball, it would have been in the top corner of the net".

His form suffered and he managed only four goals from twenty games in season 1998–99. His final game on 13 January 1999, saw West Ham lose 1–0 in an FA Cup tie against his hometown club, Swansea City.

Hartson played 73 times and scored 33 goals for the east London club.

=== Wimbledon ===
Hartson joined Wimbledon in January 1999, becoming the club's most expensive signing ever at £7.5m. His time with the Dons was marred by injury, though he still managed a respectable goal tally, first in the Premier League, then the First Division following the club's relegation in 2000. Proposed moves to Rangers, Tottenham and Charlton fell through due to doubts over the player's fitness. Hartson instead joined Coventry City on a pay-for-play deal in February 2001.

=== Coventry City ===
Hartson made his Coventry debut against former club West Ham on 12 February 2001. He went on to score six goals in twelve league games, including a brace in a defeat to Manchester United at Old Trafford. However, despite his efforts Coventry were relegated from the Premier League at the end of the season.

=== Celtic ===
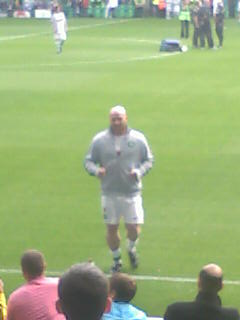
John Hartson before kick-off at the John Kennedy testimonial match, 9 August 2011

In August 2001, Hartson joined Celtic in a £6m transfer. He made his debut on 4 August 2001, coming on as a substitute in a league match away at Kilmarnock. He scored his first goals for Celtic when he scored a hat-trick in a 5–1 win over Dundee United on 20 October 2001. At the end of his first season at Celtic he helped them win the Scottish Premier League title.

In December 2002, Hartson scored as Celtic were beaten 2–1 in the away leg of their third round UEFA Cup tie against Celta Vigo. However, with the aggregate score 2–2, Celtic progressed on the away goals rule. This was the first time that Celtic had remained in European competition after Christmas since 1980. In March 2003, Celtic faced Liverpool in the UEFA Cup at the quarter final stage, drawing 1–1 in Glasgow. In the return leg at Anfield, Hartson fired the club's goal of the season with a strike past Jerzy Dudek into the top corner from over 25 yards out. Celtic won this match 2–0, progressing to the semi-final. After scoring the winning goal against Rangers at Ibrox in late April Hartson was plagued by a back injury which meant he missed the rest of the season, including the 2003 UEFA Cup Final. Nevertheless, he had played a major role in getting Celtic all the way through the tournament, with his goals in Liverpool and Vigo, as well as several assists. Celtic were defeated 3–2 in the final after extra time by José Mourinho's FC Porto.

In March 2004, he dropped out for the remainder of the football season for surgery to his back; however, he recovered in time for Wales' unsuccessful qualifying campaign for the 2006 World Cup. Celtic went on to win the 2003–04 Scottish Cup and the 2003-04 title in his absence.

In April 2005 he shared the Scottish PFA Players' Player of the Year award with Fernando Ricksen and in May he was voted the Scottish Football Writers' Association Player of the Year. He played as Celtic won the 2005 Scottish Cup Final.

On 6 November 2005 Hartson scored his 100th goal for Celtic against Falkirk. He missed Celtic's victory in the 2006 Scottish League Cup Final through suspension. He scored the only goal against Hearts, on 5 April 2006, his 31st birthday to clinch the title for Celtic.

Hartson was sent off on a number of occasions, one being a notable dismissal towards the end of an Old Firm derby, when he was sent off for violent conduct along with Celtic teammate Johan Mjällby and Rangers player Fernando Ricksen. Hartson's dismissal was overturned on appeal.

Due to the close bond Hartson felt with both Celtic Football Club and their fans, he has a tattoo of a large Celtic crest on his upper arm with the words 'You'll Never Walk Alone' underneath in honour of the song which Celtic fans sing ahead of big games. After a picture of the tattoo appeared on the internet and many Celtic F.C. forums, Hartson tweeted that the tattoo was real and in honour of the support he had received from Celtic fans during his illness. The tweet read, "Yes my Celtic tattoo is real I had it done soon as I came out of hospital after the support I was given by the whole Celtic family."

=== West Bromwich Albion ===
On 26 June 2006, Hartson signed a two-year contract with English Football League Championship side West Bromwich Albion in a £500,000 move. Hartson scored twice on his Albion debut in a 2–0 Hawthorns win against Hull City on 5 August 2006.

On 31 August 2007, The Times said that Hartson had signed for League One club Nottingham Forest on a loan move. On 5 September 2007, the Western Mail reported that Hartson had rejected a firm approach from Forest and was on the verge of signing for his hometown club Swansea City on loan. However the club quickly issued a statement on its website denying the striker was set to sign.

In October 2007 Hartson joined Norwich City on a month's loan. Although Norwich had the option to extend the loan until 31 December, newly appointed manager Glenn Roeder decided to send Hartson back to the Midlands after the initial month period. He then rejected an offer to join Chester City on loan. In January 2008 Hartson was released by West Bromwich Albion, six months before the end of his contract.

On 7 February 2008, Hartson announced his retirement from football, citing his long-term struggles with weight and fitness as major reasons for finishing his career.

== International career ==
Hartson won 51 first team caps for Wales, scoring 14 goals. He is currently the 11th highest scorer of all time for the Welsh.

He also holds a record for the Wales U21 team by being one of only four people to have scored a hat-trick at that level alongside Craig Davies, Lee Jones and Ched Evans.

Hartson retired from international football in February 2006 in order to concentrate on his career with Celtic but in August that year he stated that he would come out of retirement to play if John Toshack needed him.

== Media career ==
Just a few weeks after his retirement from playing, East Stirlingshire in the Scottish Football League Third Division offered Hartson the chance to succeed Gordon Wylde as manager, but Hartson rejected the opportunity, saying that, "the timing is just not right for me at the moment." Hartson joined Setanta Sports as a pundit for the 2008–09 season, as part of the broadcaster's coverage of the Scottish Premier League. A Welsh speaker, Hartson appears regularly as a studio guest on S4C's Sgorio. He was also a regular pundit on ITV's coverage of the FA Cup until ITV lost the rights to the competition at the end of the 2013/14 season, and often appears on BBC Radio 5 Live's coverage of both Premier League and Champions League games as a match summariser. In 2011 Hartson was appointed part-time coach with Newport County. In 2016, he joined BT Sport to provide analysis on the newly launched BT Sport Score. John also appeared in the Welsh language travel interest program Am Dro (Going for a Walk) broadcast on 1 January 2024

== Personal life ==
In July 2009 Hartson received chemotherapy after being diagnosed with testicular cancer which had spread to his brain. It was later reported the cancer had spread to his lungs and that he remained in a "critical condition" following emergency surgery. The treatment was successful and by December of that year it was reported that the cancer had been virtually eradicated from Hartson's body although he would have more surgery and treatment to come. Hartson is a lifelong Swansea City supporter.

In February 2024, Hartson was probed by the Advertising Standards Authority for misconduct while promoting and advertising Supreme CBD, owned by ex-boxer Anthony Fowler. Fowler along with other celebrities including Paul Merson, Matt Le Tissier and John Hartson have all been investigated and issued with a warning by the ASA. The ASA investigation concluded that their social media posts have been found to be commercial in nature, and not "honest" opinions about the benefits of CBD, since they were being financially rewarded for their posts. The investigation also concluded that the posts made by these celebrities were making unlawful medical claims about the use of CBD, which is prohibited by the Medicines and Healthcare products Regulatory Agency.

== Career statistics ==
=== Club ===
Appearances and goals by club, season and competition
Club	Season	League			National cup (Note: Includes FA Cup, Scottish Cup)		League cup (Note: Includes Football League Cup, Scottish League Cup)		Europe		Total	
Club	Season	Division	Apps	Goals	Apps	Goals	Apps	Goals	Apps	Goals	Apps	Goals
Luton Town	1992–93	First Division	0	0	0	0	0	0	–		0	0
Luton Town	1993–94	First Division	34	6	5	1	0	0	–		39	7
Luton Town	1994–95	First Division	20	5	1	1	0	0	–		21	6
Luton Town	Total		54	11	6	2	0	0	0	0	60	13
Arsenal	1994–95	Premier League	15	7	0	0	0	0	7 (Note: Appearances in UEFA Cup Winners' Cup)	1	22	8
Arsenal	1995–96	Premier League	19	4	1	0	3	1	–		23	5
Arsenal	1996–97	Premier League	19	3	2	1	3	0	2 (Note: Appearances in UEFA Cup)	0	26	4
Arsenal	Total		53	14	3	1	6	1	9	1	71	17
West Ham United	1996–97	Premier League	11	5	–		–		–		11	5
West Ham United	1997–98	Premier League	32	15	5	3	5	6	–		42	24
West Ham United	1998–99	Premier League	17	4	2	0	1	0	–		20	4
West Ham United	Total		60	24	7	3	6	6	0	0	73	33
Wimbledon	1998–99	Premier League	14	2	0	0	0	0	–		14	2
Wimbledon	1999–2000	Premier League	16	9	1	0	3	0	–		20	9
Wimbledon	2000–01	First Division	19	8	0	0	4	2	–		23	10
Wimbledon	Total		49	19	1	0	7	2	0	0	57	21
Coventry City	2000–01	Premier League	12	6	0	0	0	0	–		12	6
Celtic	2001–02	Scottish Premier League	31	19	3	2	3	3	5 (Note: Three appearances in UEFA Champions League, two appearances in UEFA Cup)	0	42	24
Celtic	2002–03	Scottish Premier League	27	18	2	2	4	2	12 (Note: One appearance in UEFA Champions League, eleven appearances and three goals in UEFA Cup)	3	45	25
Celtic	2003–04	Scottish Premier League	15	8	1	1	0	0	7 (Note: Appearances in UEFA Champions League)	1	23	10
Celtic	2004–05	Scottish Premier League	38	25	5	3	1	1	6	1	50	30
Celtic	2005–06	Scottish Premier League	35	18	1	0	3	1	2	1	41	20
Celtic	Total		146	88	12	8	11	7	32	6	201	109
West Bromwich Albion	2006–07	Championship	21	5	1	1	2	0	–		24	6
Norwich City (loan)	2007–08	Championship	4	0	0	0	0	0	–		4	0
Career total			399	167	30	15	32	16	41	7	502	205

=== International ===
Appearances and goals by national team and year
National team	Year	Apps	Goals
Wales	1995	4	0
Wales	1996	3	0
Wales	1997	4	1
Wales	1998	3	1
Wales	1999	4	0
Wales	2000	2	0
Wales	2001	6	4
Wales	2002	7	2
Wales	2003	7	3
Wales	2004	5	3
Wales	2005	6	0
Total		51	14

== Honours ==
Arsenal

- UEFA Cup Winners' Cup runner-up: 1994–95

Celtic

- Scottish Premier League: 2001–02, 2003–04, 2005–06
- Scottish Cup: 2003–04, 2004–05
- Scottish League Cup: 2005–06

Individual

- Welsh Footballer of the Year: 1998, 2001, 2003
- PFA Scotland Players' Player of the Year: 2005
- SFWA Footballer of the Year: 2005
- FAI International Personality: 2016
