= Paul Showler =

English footballer

Personal information
- Date of birth: 10 October 1966 (age 60)
- Place of birth: Batley, England
- Height: 5 ft 7 in (1.70 m)
- Position: Winger

Youth career
- 1981–1984: Sheffield Wednesday

Senior career*
Years	Team	Apps	(Gls)
1984–1985	Bentley Victoria		
1985–1989	Goole Town		
1989–1990	Colne Dynamoes		
1990–1991	Altrincham	41	(8)
1991–1993	Barnet	71	(12)
1993–1996	Bradford City	88	(15)
1996–1999	Luton Town	27	(6)
- * Club domestic league appearances and goals

Paul Showler (born 10 October 1966) is an English retired footballer. He began as a trainee at Sheffield Wednesday but after failing to get a professional contract he juggled a job as a police officer with non-league football. He returned to league football with Barnet, where he became a firm favourite down the left wing, becoming known for his goalscoring corner kicks. He later moved to Bradford City and Luton Town, before retiring in 1999.

He graduated from the University of Salford in 1999 with a degree in Physiotherapy and became a physiotherapist at Peterborough United.
