= Ben Chenery =

English footballer (born 1977)

Personal information
- Full name: Benjamin Chenery
- Date of birth: 28 January 1977 (age 49)
- Place of birth: Ipswich, England
- Height: 6 ft 1 in (1.85 m)
- Position: Defender

Team information
- Current team: Ipswich Town (Academy Manager)

Senior career*
Years	Team	Apps	(Gls)
1993–1994	Ipswich Town	0	(0)
1994–1997	Luton Town	2	(0)
1997–2000	Cambridge United	99	(2)
2000–2001	Kettering Town		
2001–2006	Canvey Island	169	(2)
2006–2007	Chelmsford City	44	(1)

Managerial career
- 2014–2023: Bury Town
- * Club domestic league appearances and goals

Benjamin Chenery (born 28 January 1977) is an English footballer who played in The Football League for Cambridge United and Luton Town. He is currently Academy Manager for Ipswich Town.

After a spell at Kettering Town he joined Canvey Island and played for them for five years. While at the club he scored the winning goal in the FA Trophy final in 2001 against Forest Green Rovers.

After retiring from the game in 2007 Ben quickly rose through the coaching ranks and after a brief spell as assistant manager at Conference South side Chelmsford City FC joined semi-professional Isthmian League side Bury Town FC in July 2012 as assistant to Richard Wilkins. He took over as Manager of Bury Town in July 2014.

== Honours ==
=== As a player ===
Canvey Island

- FA Trophy Winner (1): 2000–01
- Isthmian League Premier Division Winner (1): 2003–04
- Isthmian League Premier Division Runner-Up (3): 2000–01, 2001–02, 2002–03
- Essex Senior Cup Winner (1): 2001–02
- Essex Senior Cup Runner-Up (1): 2000–01
