= Dwight Marshall =

English footballer (born 1965)

Personal information
- Date of birth: 3 October 1965 (age 61)
- Place of birth: Hanover, Jamaica
- Height: 5 ft 7 in (1.70 m)
- Position: Striker

Senior career*
Years	Team	Apps	(Gls)
- Grays Athletic
1991–1994	Plymouth Argyle	99	(27)
1993	→ Middlesbrough (loan)	3	(0)
1994–1998	Luton Town	128	(28)
1998–1999	Plymouth Argyle	28	(12)
1999–2000	Kingstonian		
1999–2001	Slough Town		
2001–2002	Aylesbury United		
2002	Boreham Wood		
2002–2003	Leyton Pennant		
2003–2004	Enfield		
Total		258	(67)
- * Club domestic league appearances and goals

Dwight Marshall (born 3 October 1965) is an English former footballer who played as a striker.

As a schoolboy, Marshall attended Holloway Boys School in North London, and was one of the most gifted right-wingers of his day, making many appearances for Islington schools. As a professional, Marshall was an attacking left-winger or striker who featured for Plymouth Argyle, Middlesbrough and Luton Town. He also appeared for a number of non-league sides during his career. In total, Dwight made 129 league appearances for Argyle, scoring 40 goals. His time at Luton was also successful as he played in 128 league games and scored 28 goals for the Hatters.

Marshall broke his leg during the 1995–96 season, which ended with Luton being relegated from what is now the Championship. He never regained his place or his form, and he eventually left for a brief spell back at Plymouth. He then drifted into non-league football, playing at Kenilworth Road again for Kingstonian against Luton in an FA Cup tie during the 1999–2000 season.

Marshall now works as a HR business partner for a North London college.
