= Jamie Campbell (English footballer) =

English footballer

Personal information
- Full name: Jamie Campbell
- Date of birth: 21 October 1972 (age 54)
- Place of birth: Birmingham, England
- Height: 6 ft 2 in (1.88 m)
- Positions: Midfielder; defender

Youth career
- Luton Town

Senior career*
Years	Team	Apps	(Gls)
1991–1995	Luton Town	36	(1)
1994	→ Mansfield Town (loan)	3	(1)
1995	→ Cambridge United (loan)	12	(0)
1995–1997	Barnet	67	(5)
1997–1999	Cambridge United	91	(6)
1999–2000	Brighton & Hove Albion	23	(1)
2000–2002	Exeter City	58	(3)
2002–2003	Stevenage Borough	34	(1)
2003–2004	Woking	17	(0)
2004	→ Havant & Waterlooville (loan)	6	(0)
2004–2005	Havant & Waterlooville	38	(0)
Total		385	(18)
- * Club domestic league appearances and goals

Jamie Campbell (born 21 October 1972) is an English former professional footballer who made over 300 appearances in the Football League.

A defender or midfielder, Campbell played for Luton Town in the First Division. After loan spells with Mansfield Town and Cambridge United, he moved on to Barnet before rejoining Cambridge United with whom he won promotion to the Second Division. A season with Brighton & Hove Albion preceded 18 months with Exeter City, where he was Player of the Year in 2000–01. He then moved into non-league football with clubs including Stevenage Borough, for whom he played on the losing side in the 2002 FA Trophy Final, Woking, and Havant & Waterlooville.
