= David Pleat =

English footballer & manager

Personal information
- Full name: David John Pleat
- Date of birth: 15 January 1945 (age 81)
- Place of birth: Nottingham, England
- Position: Winger

Senior career*
Years	Team	Apps	(Gls)
1962–1964	Nottingham Forest	6	(1)
1964–1967	Luton Town	70	(9)
1967–1968	Shrewsbury Town	12	(1)
1968–1970	Exeter City	69	(14)
1970–1971	Peterborough United	28	(2)
Total		185	(27)

International career
- England Schoolboys
- England Youth

Managerial career
- 1971–1977: Nuneaton Borough
- 1978–1986: Luton Town
- 1986–1987: Tottenham Hotspur
- 1987–1991: Leicester City
- 1991–1995: Luton Town
- 1995–1997: Sheffield Wednesday
- 1998: Tottenham Hotspur (caretaker)
- 2001: Tottenham Hotspur (caretaker)
- 2003–2004: Tottenham Hotspur
- * Club domestic league appearances and goals

David John Pleat (born 15 January 1945) is an English football player turned manager, and sports commentator. Pleat made 185 Football League appearances for five clubs, scoring 26 goals. He had two spells as manager of Luton Town, and four as manager of Tottenham Hotspur (two of which were as caretaker manager).

== Early life ==
Pleat was born in Nottingham, England, and is of Jewish descent.

== Playing career ==
As a winger, Pleat represented England at schoolboy and youth international level. He began his playing career with his hometown club Nottingham Forest. In February 1962, he made his debut as the youngest ever player for the club at the time aged 17 years and 33 days against Cardiff City in Division 1. His goal in a 2–1 win over the Bluebirds that day remains the youngest by a debutant for Nottingham Forest.

Injuries hampered his career and after spells at Luton Town (1964–67), Shrewsbury Town (1967–68) and Exeter City (1968–70) and Peterborough United (1970–71), he turned to coaching and management, having already qualified as a Full Badge FA Coach in 1968 when he was just 23.

== Managerial career ==
=== Nuneaton Borough ===
His first coaching position was for Southern League team Nuneaton Borough in 1971, where he was appointed as player-manager on the recommendation of Peter Taylor, who worked alongside Brian Clough at Derby County and Nottingham Forest, and stayed there for two and a half seasons.

=== Luton Town ===
From there he joined the coaching staff at Luton Town, initially as reserve team coach. In January 1978 he was appointed manager of the club. During his eight years as manager of Luton Town the side were promoted from the Football League Second Division to the First Division, winning the second tier by a record number of points, and gained a reputation for playing attacking and attractive football, peaking at ninth place in the top flight in 1986. Although the highest position in the club's history was achieved in 1986/87 after Pleat had left (but with a team largely made up of Pleat's players) when Luton finished 7th in the old division one. A number of players in Pleat's team would receive international recognition, including defender Mal Donaghy (Northern Ireland), midfielder Ricky Hill and forwards Brian Stein, Paul Walsh and Mick Harford (all England).

In 1983, Luton came close to being relegated from Division One, but reached safety after a late goal by Radomir Antić against Manchester City in the final game of the season.

Luton came close to reaching the FA Cup final in 1985 under Pleat. They were beaten 2–1 by Everton in the semi-final in extra time at Villa Park. Luton also lost in the quarter-final against Everton the following year. Although Luton did not manage to reach a Cup final during Pleat's time in charge, the team that won the 1988 League Cup under Ray Harford, beating Arsenal 3–2 in the final, was largely Pleat's team of the early and mid-1980s, with nine of the starting XI having been his signings.

=== Tottenham Hotspur ===
In May 1986, Pleat was appointed manager of Tottenham Hotspur. He brought Mitchell Thomas with him from Luton. His earliest change at the club was to bring in Richard Gough whom he paired with Gary Mabbutt in defence, moving Paul Allen into midfield. In the 1986–87 season, his only full season as manager, Tottenham Hotspur finished third in the First Division, and reached the FA Cup final and the semi-final of the Football League Cup. Pleat received the 'Manager of the Month' awards in both January and February 1987. Glenn Moore, writing in The Independent in 1995, described the play during Pleat's stint as manager of Spurs as "some of the best attacking football of the last two decades". During this season, he played with five in midfield including creative players such as Ossie Ardiles, Chris Waddle and Glenn Hoddle and just one striker – Clive Allen, who scored 49 goals in all competitions.

The team lost 3–2 after extra time in the FA Cup Final against Coventry City one match.

Pleat's employment as manager of Tottenham came to an end in October 1987 when he resigned after unsubstantiated newspaper claims about his private life. He was replaced by Terry Venables.

=== Leicester City and return to Luton Town ===
Pleat made a quick return to management just two months later with Leicester City, who had just been relegated from the First Division, initially taking them from the lower regions of the Second Division into the top six thanks to 34 points from 17 games. He stayed at Filbert Street for more than three years but, hampered by financial constraints and the sale of key players such as Mike Newell, Gary McAllister and Russell Osman, was unable to help them achieve promotion and returned to Luton Town in June 1991 for a second spell as manager of the club. They were relegated at the end of his first season back at Kenilworth Road, missing out on a place in the new FA Premier League, but the club's board kept faith in him. Despite disappointing form in the new Division One, they did reach the FA Cup semi-final in 1994, losing 2–0 to Chelsea. During his second spell at Luton, he developed a number of players from the youth team including Mark Pembridge, John Hartson, Paul Telfer and Ceri Hughes, who would all go on to leave for large transfer fees. In fact, Hartson's £2.5m transfer to Arsenal in January 1995 was a British record fee for a teenage player at the time.

=== Sheffield Wednesday ===
Pleat left Luton after being offered the chance to manage Premier League side Sheffield Wednesday in the summer of 1995. His first actions as manager for Wednesday, a position which he took over from Trevor Francis, were to add Mark Pembridge and Marc Degryse to the first team squad. His first season at Hillsborough was frustrating, as they finished 15th in the Premier League – their lowest finish in five seasons since promotion – with an aging squad of players.

Pleat was tasked by the board with moving on a number of star players deemed to be past their peak during this period with the likes of John Sheridan, Chris Woods, Chris Waddle and Mark Bright all departing permanently or on loan throughout 1996, with striker David Hirst following soon after in 1997 as his injury problems continued.

The start of Pleat's second season at the club saw them win their first four fixtures of the 1996–97 season, against Aston Villa, Leeds United, Newcastle United and Leicester City, earning Pleat the Premier League Manager of the Month for August 1996 as the Owls topped the Premier League. In October of that season, Pleat signed Benito Carbone, who would become a cult hero at Hillsborough. That summer saw Pleat add another Italian in Paolo Di Canio, who would also go on to make a significant contribution in the Premier League, but after a poor start the following season, Pleat was sacked in November 1997.

=== Back to Tottenham ===
In 1998, he returned to Tottenham Hotspur with Alan Sugar appointing him as the club's first Director of Football, working alongside then manager Christian Gross, who was soon succeeded by George Graham. In September 2003, after the sacking of Glenn Hoddle, he took over as caretaker manager, a position that he held until the end of the season. This was the third of three occasions in which he had been caretaker manager for the club; he had previously fulfilled the role in 1998, before George Graham, during which time the team achieved four wins, two draws, and one defeat.

His ability to unearth young talent continued at White Hart Lane signing the likes of Matthew Etherington, Simon Davies, Gary Doherty and Anthony Gardner from the lower leagues, who would all become regular members of the first team and the latter three represented their respective countries at full national team level, while he was also key in the acquisitions of Frederic Kanoute, Robbie Keane, Jermain Defoe and Paul Robinson.

=== Other roles and achievements ===
Pleat left Tottenham in 2004 and took up advisory roles with Portsmouth, West Bromwich Albion and Nottingham Forest before returning to Spurs again in 2010 as a consultant scout. He departed Tottenham at the end of the 2023/24 season. Pleat has been instrumental in the signings of Dele Alli, Jan Vertonghen and Ben Davies.

He has also worked for the Premier League as an analyst for youth games and advising on academies.

Pleat is the longest-serving member of the League Managers Association Board and management committee, having joined in 1978, and, in 2012, he was inducted into the LMA Hall of Fame, which now includes the likes of Sir Alex Ferguson, Fabio Capello, Pep Guardiola, Jose Mourinho and Jurgen Klopp.

That same year, he was also awarded an M.A. (Hons) at Luton University for his services to football and the media.

He has served on a number of FA panels concerning discipline, transfer tribunals and permits for overseas players.

In 2021, Pleat was voted Luton Town's greatest manager by fans in a poll by Vital Football, securing 74% of all votes cast.

== Media career ==
Pleat has written a regular column for The Guardian newspaper since 2004, primarily exploring the tactical side of recent matches, and has also contributed articles to the Daily Mail, The Independent and The Daily Telegraph.

Starting with the 1986 FIFA World Cup, he has covered seven consecutive World Cups as a co-commentator, working on either radio or television, including with the BBC, ITV and UEFA. He has also covered a number of Champions League finals and several European Championship tournaments.

His autobiography "Just One More Goal" was published in September 2024

=== Managerial statistics ===
Team	From	To	Record				
Team	From	To	G	W	D	L	Win %
Luton Town	25 January 1978	16 May 1986	405	160	109	136	39.51
Tottenham Hotspur	16 May 1986	23 October 1987	71	39	11	21	54.93
Leicester City	24 December 1987	29 January 1991	153	49	44	60	32.03
Luton Town	6 June 1991	14 June 1995	202	55	66	81	27.23
Sheffield Wednesday	14 June 1995	3 November 1997	102	32	30	40	31.37
Tottenham Hotspur (caretaker)	7 September 1998	1 October 1998	6	3	2	1	50.00
Tottenham Hotspur (caretaker)	16 March 2001	2 April 2001	2	1	0	1	50.00
Tottenham Hotspur	21 September 2003	3 June 2004	39	16	7	16	41.03
Total			980	355	269	356	36.22

== Honours ==
=== Manager ===
Luton Town

- Football League Second Division: 1981–82

Tottenham Hotspur

- FA Cup runner-up: 1986–87

Individual

- Football League First Division, Manager of the Month: January 1987, February 1987
- Premier League Manager of the Month: August 1996
