= Juergen Sommer =

American soccer player (born 1969)

Personal information
- Full name: Juergen Petersen Sommer
- Date of birth: February 27, 1969 (age 57)
- Place of birth: New York, New York, United States
- Height: 6 ft 5 in (1.96 m)
- Position: Goalkeeper

Youth career
- 1987–1990: Indiana Hoosiers

Senior career*
Years	Team	Apps	(Gls)
1991–1995	Luton Town	82	(0)
1991–1992	→ Brighton (loan)	1	(0)
1991–1992	→ Kettering Town (loan)	10	(0)
1992–1993	→ Torquay United (loan)	10	(0)
1995–1998	Queens Park Rangers	66	(0)
1998–1999	Columbus Crew	21	(0)
1999	→ Myrtle Beach Seadawgs (loan)	2	(0)
2000	Connecticut Wolves	1	(0)
2000–2002	New England Revolution	33	(0)
2001	→ Bolton Wanderers (loan)	0	(0)
Total		224	(0)

International career
1994–1998	United States	10	(0)

Managerial career
- 2014–2015: Indy Eleven
Medal record
Representing United States
Runner-up	CONCACAF Gold Cup	1998
Men's Soccer
- * Club domestic league appearances and goals

Juergen Petersen Sommer (born February 27, 1969) is an American former professional soccer player and coach. He became the first American goalkeeper to play in the FA Premier League, when he signed to play for Queens Park Rangers in 1995. He has served as the United States national team goalkeeping coach. Later on, Sommer coached Indy Eleven in the NASL.

== Youth and college ==
Sommer played soccer at Culver Military Academy in Culver, Indiana where he was an All-American. After graduation, Sommer walked on at Indiana University, where he quickly became the starting goalkeeper in 1987. He was named Collegiate Goalkeeper of the Year in 1990.

== Club career ==
Sommer left Indiana to sign with Luton Town of the First Division in 1991. Sommer played for the next seven years in England for Queens Park Rangers, Luton Town and Torquay. In 1998, he made the jump back home to sign with the Columbus Crew of Major League Soccer, as a replacement for Brad Friedel, who had signed for Liverpool the previous year. Sommer became the Crew starter over the next two seasons, and after a pair of major knee injuries, he signed with the New England Revolution. In 2000, he played one game with the Connecticut Wolves in the USISL A-League. After another injury forced Sommer to the sidelines, and the emergence of Adin Brown as the Revolution's starting goalkeeper, he retired after the 2002 MLS Cup. He represented English side Bolton Wanderers for just one FA Cup game against Blackburn Rovers in February 2001. Sommer answered an S.O.S. by Wanderers manager Sam Allardyce who saw his other goalkeepers either injured or ineligible but was himself injured during the match.

== International career ==
Throughout his career, Sommer earned ten caps for the United States national team, and was a member of the team which competed at the 1994 and 1998 FIFA World Cups. Although many rated him as a solid goalkeeper in his prime, Brad Friedel, Kasey Keller and Tony Meola greatly reduced his chances of seeing an extended run in the national team.
