= David Kohler (developer) =

British sports executive

David Kohler is a property developer who was chairman of Luton Town Football Club from 1992 until 1999.

Kohler was a property developer when he took joint ownership of Luton Town on 22 May 1990, in partnership with Peter Nelkin. Nelkin was appointed chairman, and Kohler the managing director. One of the new regime's first actions was to lift a ban on visiting supporters; Luton's Kenilworth Road ground had been for "members only" since 1986.

In 1992 Kohler and Nelkin considered selling Luton Town to boxing promoter Frank Warren, and building a new 25,000-seat stadium to the south of the town. Luton Town was sold in June 1992 to Mike and Sheila Watson-Challis, and Kohler moved up to chairman. The team was losing money quickly, sold many of their best players, and was relegated from Division I in 1992, missing out on the new FA Premier League. A group of supporters took to chanting "Kohler out" behind the main stands. Kohler said that he was prepared to sell at the right price, but a deal headed by the former Fulham player John Mitchell fell through.

In October 1994, Kohler told Mihir Bose of The Sunday Times about his plan for a new stadium. The multi-purpose indoor stadium would seat 20,000, and feature a moveable grass pitch. Kohler dubbed the plan the "Kohlerdome", and compared it to the Pontiac Silverdome, which had hosted matches at that summer's World Cup. Kohler had only just applied for planning permission for the development, and had yet to purchase the land.

After a public inquiry in 1996, outline consent for the plan was given, contingent on widening of the adjacent M1 motorway. In 1997, the new Labour government confirmed that it would not be widening the M1, and consent for the stadium was withdrawn. An appeal to the Department of the Environment in 1998 was turned down on grounds of traffic congestion. A request to review the stadium decision at the High Court was declined three days after Kohler left the club.

By this time, Luton Town was playing in the third-level Division Two, and continued to have to sell their best players. Kohler had already had his house vandalised. He stepped down as chairman in February 1999, after a petrol bomb and matches were posted through the letterbox of his home. Luton Town went into receivership a month later, while Kohler sought to sell his controlling stake in the club. He sold the club to Cliff Bassett before the start of the new season in August 1999.

After ending his involvement with the football club, Kohler remained active in the property market in Bedfordshire, taking over the management of Midland House in Luton in 2006 and purchasing land in Stewartby in 2016 for development.
