= Jason Rees =

Welsh footballer

Personal information
- Full name: Jason Mark Rees
- Date of birth: 22 December 1969 (age 56)
- Place of birth: Aberdare, Wales
- Position: Midfielder

Senior career*
| Years | Team | Apps | (Gls) |
| 1988–1994 | Luton Town | 82 | (0) |
| 1993–1994 | → Mansfield Town (loan) | 15 | (1) |
| 1994–1997 | Portsmouth | 43 | (3) |
| 1997 | → Exeter City (loan) | 7 | (0) |
| 1997–1998 | Cambridge United | 20 | (0) |
| 1998–2000 | Exeter City | 87 | (5) |
| 2000 | Tiverton Town | | |
| 2000–2002 | Torquay United | 58 | (3) |
| 2002–2004 | Tiverton Town | 79 | (0) |
| 2004–2005 | Taunton Town | 35 | (0) |

International career
| 1992 | Wales | 1 | (0) |

Managerial career
- 2010: Ottery St Mary
- 2010–: Exeter Civil Service
- * Club domestic league appearances and goals

Jason Mark Rees (born 22 December 1969) is a Welsh former professional footballer and Wales international.

== Club career ==
Rees began his career with Luton Town before moving to Portsmouth in 1994 on a free transfer, having spent the majority of the 1993–94 season on loan at Mansfield Town. He struggled to hold down a first team place at Fratton Park and was allowed to join Exeter City on loan during the 1996–97 season but a permanent move never materialised and he returned to Portsmouth until his release at the end of the season. After a spell with Cambridge United, he returned to Exeter City on a permanent deal in 1998.

Following his release by Exeter, Rees spent time on trial with Cheltenham Town, eventually joining Tiverton Town. He returned to The Football League several months later in December 2000 with Torquay United, where he spent two seasons before rejoining Tiverton in 2002. One year later, he returned to Plainmoor, captaining Tiverton Town as they won Devon Bowl for a record eighth time against his former club Torquay United.

== International career ==
Having previously represented Wales at under-21 and B levels, Rees made his senior debut on 29 April 1992, coming on to replace Jeremy Goss during a 1–1 draw with Austria.

== Managerial career ==
Rees now manages South West Peninsula League side Exeter Civil Service, following a brief stint with Ottery St Mary

== Honours ==
Tiverton Town

- Devon Bowl Winner: 1

2003
