= Darren Salton =

Scottish footballer

Personal information
- Full name: Darren Brian Salton
- Date of birth: 16 March 1972 (age 54)
- Place of birth: Edinburgh, Scotland
- Position: Central defender

Youth career
- 1988–1989: Luton Town

Senior career*
Years	Team	Apps	(Gls)
1989–1993	Luton Town	18	(0)

International career
1992	Scotland U-21	7	(0)

Managerial career
- 2004–2007: Hitchin Town
- * Club domestic league appearances and goals

Darren Brian Salton (born 16 March 1972 in Edinburgh) is a Scottish former under-21 international footballer, whose career was cut short by injuries suffered in a car accident.

== Playing career ==
Darren Salton joined Luton Town as a trainee in 1988, along with a friend from Edinburgh, Paul Telfer. Salton signed professionally in March 1989, and made his league debut at Elland Road against Leeds United on 29 February 1992 in the Football League First Division. However, Luton were relegated at the end of that season and were denied a place in the new FA Premier League.

Salton became a first-team regular in the early part of the 1992–93 season, starting 15 of Luton's first 17 league games that season. He was also capped six times by Scotland under-21, but his promising career came to an abrupt end when he and Telfer were involved in a car crash on 27 November 1992. Although Telfer, the vehicle's driver, suffered only minor injuries, a woman died in the collision and Salton was severely injured; the wounds to his leg ensured that he never played professional football again. He announced his retirement during the 1993–94 season.

== Non-playing career ==
Salton still lives in the Luton area, and was manager of Southern League side Hitchin Town from December 2004 until November 2007. After a spell as assistant manager at Hemel Hempstead, he became assistant manager at Slough Town in March 2009.
