= Des Linton =

English footballer (born 1971)

Des Lintonn
Personal information
- Full name: Desmond Martin Linton
- Date of birth: 5 September 1971 (age 55)
- Place of birth: Birmingham, England
- Height: 6 ft 1 in (1.85 m)
- Position: Defender

Youth career
- Leicester City

Senior career*
Years	Team	Apps	(Gls)
1989–1991	Leicester City	11	(0)
1991–1997	Luton Town	83	(1)
1997–1999	Peterborough United	46	(1)
1999	→ Swindon Town (loan)	8	(0)
- Cambridge City
- * Club domestic league appearances and goals

Desmond Martin Linton (born 5 September 1971) is an English former professional footballer.

== Career ==
Linton was born in Birmingham. He began his career with Leicester City, where he made eleven league appearances before moving along with teammate Scott Oakes to Luton Town. After six years with Luton, he moved on to Peterborough United, where he spent two years before a short loan spell at Swindon Town. He finished his career with Cambridge City.
