= Paul Telfer (footballer) =

Scottish footballer

Personal information
- Full name: Paul Norman Telfer
- Date of birth: 21 October 1971 (age 55)
- Place of birth: Edinburgh, Scotland
- Height: 5 ft 9 in (1.75 m)
- Position: Right-back

Senior career*
Years	Team	Apps	(Gls)
1988–1995	Luton Town	144	(19)
1995–2001	Coventry City	191	(6)
2001–2005	Southampton	127	(1)
2005–2007	Celtic	57	(1)
2007	AFC Bournemouth	18	(0)
2008–2009	Leeds United	14	(0)
2009	Slough Town	1	(0)
2011–2014	Sutton United	46	(1)
Total		598	(28)

International career
1993	Scotland U21	3	(0)
1994–1995	Scotland B	2	(0)
2000	Scotland	1	(0)
- * Club domestic league appearances and goals

Paul Norman Telfer (born 21 October 1971) is a Scottish football coach and former professional footballer.

Telfer made over 300 league appearances in the Premier League for Coventry City and Southampton between 1995 and 2005. He previously played over 150 times for Luton Town. In 2005, he signed for Scottish Premier League side Celtic where he made 57 appearances in two seasons in his native country. He later went on to feature for AFC Bournemouth and Leeds United before finishing his career with non-league side Slough Town in 2009. He was capped once by Scotland in 2000, having previously been capped at U21 and B team level.

In 2011, he joined the coaching staff at Sutton United and also agreed to make a return to the playing side of the game. He has also had a spell with North American Soccer League team Indy Eleven as assistant coach.

== Club career ==
=== Luton Town ===
Telfer was born in Edinburgh, but began his career at Luton Town as a right-sided midfielder. He made over 150 competitive first team appearances for Luton including 144 league games.

In November 1992, Telfer and then Luton teammate Darren Salton were involved in a head on car crash in Bedfordshire. Telfer, the driver of the car, suffered only minor injuries and went on to make a full recovery. Salton spent seven days on a life support machine and a further two and half weeks in a coma. Salton was forced to quit football following the accident. A 51-year-old female passenger in the other car was killed.

=== Coventry City ===
In the summer of 1995, he was signed by manager Ron Atkinson for Coventry City, where he began his long association with Gordon Strachan, who at the time was player-coach at the club, and later became manager. While at Coventry, Telfer won his only senior Scotland cap. Selected by Craig Brown he played in Scotland's 2–0 friendly defeat against France on 29 March 2000 at Hampden Park.

=== Southampton ===
In October 2001, shortly after Coventry's relegation from the Premiership, Telfer joined Southampton, who had appointed Strachan as manager just over a month earlier. At Southampton, Telfer was converted from midfielder to right-back, and was a member of the side that reached the 2003 FA Cup Final. He scored once during his spell at Southampton, in a 3–1 win over Newcastle in May 2002.

=== Celtic ===
In 2005, Strachan became manager at Celtic, and again made Telfer one of his first signings. Telfer played just under two years at Parkhead, where he won two Scottish League championships and scored once in the league against Aberdeen. However, his family had difficulty settling in Glasgow, and on 3 December 2006, Telfer announced he would not renew his contract with Celtic because he wished to spend more time with his family in Winchester. On 2 April 2007, Telfer brought forward his retirement and officially left Celtic to be with his family in England.

=== AFC Bournemouth ===
On 13 July 2007, Telfer came out of retirement, signing a one-year contract with League One side AFC Bournemouth. On 12 December 2007, Telfer cancelled his contract with Bournemouth to help their financial problems. A few days earlier, he had been ruled out for the season with a foot injury that required surgery and retired again.

=== Leeds United ===
On 8 August 2008, Telfer came out of retirement for a second time and joined Leeds United on a non-contract basis after initially training with Leeds to keep fitness. He signed a one-year deal with the club at the end of August. Impressing his former teammate Gary McAlliser who was managing Leeds at the time. Telfer was expected to act as cover for right back Frazer Richardson.

But after some poor performances by Leeds' centre backs, Telfer found himself playing in an unfamiliar centre back role after impressing for Leeds in the position in a League Cup game against Crystal Palace. Telfer at first put in some assured performances, but as the season went on Leeds became very vulnerable, with Telfer's lack of pace being exposed. Most notably in injury time against Huddersfield Town after Leeds conceded a goal, where Telfer's lack of pace was badly exposed. Gary McAllister was sacked in December, and new manager Simon Grayson left Telfer out of all of his first team squads during his first month at the club. On 2 February 2009, his contract was cancelled by mutual consent with Telfer saying he didn't want Leeds to spend money paying his wages whilst he wasn't going to play.

=== Slough Town and Sutton United ===
In April 2009, Telfer signed for non-league Slough Town, but failed to appear in the 2009–10 season. In the 2011 close-season, it was announced that Telfer would be joining Sutton United in a player/coach capacity.

== International career ==
Telfer was capped once by Scotland, in a friendly match with France in March 2000. He also represented Scotland at the under-21 and B team levels.

== Coaching career ==
In May 2014, Telfer joined the North American Soccer League team Indy Eleven as an assistant coach working under head coach Juergen Sommer who was a teammate during his time at Luton Town F.C. On 2 June 2015, Telfer was released from the coaching staff of Indy Eleven along with Sommer

== Personal life ==
Telfer is a nephew of Eamonn Bannon, who also played for Scotland.

== Career statistics ==
Appearances and goals by club, season and competition
Club	Season	League			FA Cup		League Cup		Other		Total	
Club	Season	Division	Apps	Goals	Apps	Goals	Apps	Goals	Apps	Goals	Apps	Goals
Luton Town
Luton Town	1990–91	First Division	1	0	0	0	0	0	—		1	0
Luton Town	1991–92	First Division	20	1	1	0	2	0	1 (Note: Appearances in Full Members' Cup)	1	24	2
Luton Town	1992–93	First Division	32	2	2	1	0	0	—		34	3
Luton Town	1993–94	First Division	45	7	7	1	1	0	1 (Note: Appearances in Anglo-Italian Cup)	0	54	8
Luton Town	1994–95	First Division	46	9	4	0	2	0	—		52	9
Luton Town	Total		144	19	14	2	5	0	2	1	165	22
Coventry City
Coventry City	1995–96	Premier League	31	1	3	1	4	0	—		38	2
Coventry City	1996–97	Premier League	34	0	4	0	4	2	—		42	2
Coventry City	1997–98	Premier League	33	3	4	2	2	0	—		39	5
Coventry City	1998–99	Premier League	32	2	3	1	2	0	—		37	3
Coventry City	1999–2000	Premier League	30	0	3	0	1	0	—		34	0
Coventry City	2000–01	Premier League	31	0	2	0	2	0	—		35	0
Coventry City	Total		191	6	19	4	15	2	0	0	225	12
Southampton
Southampton	2001–02	Premier League	28	1	1	0	1	0	—		30	1
Southampton	2002–03	Premier League	32	0	6	0	1	0	—		39	0
Southampton	2003–04	Premier League	37	0	1	0	3	0	2 (Note: Appearances in UEFA Europa League)	0	43	0
Southampton	2004–05	Premier League	30	0	4	0	2	0	—		36	0
Southampton	Total		127	1	12	0	7	0	2	0	148	1
Celtic
Celtic	2005–06	Scottish Premier League	36	1	1	0	3	0	2 (Note: Appearances in UEFA Champions League)	0	42	0
Celtic	2006–07	Scottish Premier League	21	0	2	0	2	0	6	0	31	0
Celtic	Total		57	1	3	0	5	0	8	0	73	1
Bournemouth	2007–08	League One	18	0	3	0	0	0	3 (Note: Appearances in EFL Trophy)	0	24	0
Leeds United	2008–09	League One	14	0	2	0	2	0	—		18	0
Slough Town	2008–09	Division One South & West	1	0	0	0	—		—		1	0
Sutton United
Sutton United	2011–12	Conference South	28	1	4	0	—		2 (Note: Appearances in Conference South play-offs)	0	34	1
Sutton United	2012–13	Conference South	13	0	0	0	—		1 (Note: Appearances in FA Trophy)	0	14	0
Sutton United	2013–14	Conference South	5	0	0	0	—		—		5	0
Sutton United	Total		46	1	4	0	0	0	3	0	53	1
Career total			598	28	57	6	34	0	18	1	707	37

== Honours ==
Southampton

- FA Cup runner-up: 2002–03

Celtic

- Scottish Premier League: 2005–06, 2006–07
- Scottish League Cup: 2005–06
