= John Dreyer (footballer) =

English footballer and manager (born 1963)

Personal information
- Full name: John Brian Dreyer
- Date of birth: 11 June 1963 (age 63)
- Place of birth: Alnwick, Northumberland, England
- Height: 6 ft 0 in (1.83 m)
- Positions: Defender; midfielder

Senior career*
Years	Team	Apps	(Gls)
1984–1985	Wallingford Town		
1985–1988	Oxford United	60	(2)
1985	→ Torquay United (loan)	5	(0)
1988	→ Fulham (loan)	12	(2)
1988–1994	Luton Town	214	(13)
1994–1996	Stoke City	49	(3)
1995	→ Bolton Wanderers (loan)	2	(0)
1996–2000	Bradford City	80	(2)
2000–2001	Cambridge United	40	(0)
2001–2003	Stevenage Borough	26	(0)
Total		488	(22)

Managerial career
- 2003: Stevenage Borough
- 2003–2004: Maidenhead United
- 2012–2015: Preston North End (Assistant Manager)
- 2013: Preston North End (Caretaker)
- 2017: Southport (Assistant Manager)
- 2018: Ware
- 2019–2020: Oldham Athletic (Assistant Manager)
- 2022–2023: Barnet (Assistant Manager)
- 2023–2024: Burton Albion (Assistant Manager)
- * Club domestic league appearances and goals

John Brian Dreyer (born 11 June 1963) is an English former professional footballer and manager who played in defence and midfield.

== Playing career ==
Born in Alnwick, Northumberland, Dreyer started his career with Wallingford Town, leaving to join Oxford United in January 1985. He joined Torquay United on loan in December 1985 and made his league debut, for Torquay, on 14 December in a 1–1 draw at home to Cambridge United. He returned to Oxford on 13 January 1986, but moved on loan again on 27 March 1986, joining Fulham until the end of the season. He broke into the Oxford first team the following season, playing 60 times before a £140,000 move to Luton Town on 27 June 1988.

In six years at Kenilworth Road he played 214 games, scoring 13 times, but was released at the end of the 1993–94 season. In July 1994 he joined Stoke City, but started only two games for the Potters. He joined Bolton Wanderers in March 1995, and was part of the Trotters squad which secured promotion to the Premier League via the play-offs.

On 6 November 1996, he signed for Bradford City for £25,000. He scored on his debut in a 3–3 draw at Huddersfield Town. Dreyer scored a further three goals that season all in the FA Cup. They included two goals at Wycombe Wanderers and one in City's 3–2 upset of Everton.

Dreyer struggled to hold down a regular place in the side the following season but in 1998–99 he helped the Bantams to gain promotion to the Premier League including making a vital clearance in the final win of the season, 3–2 at Wolverhampton Wanderers. Although Dreyer made just 14 starts in City's season in the top flight, he made an equally vital contribution with the only goal in a 1–0 victory over Sunderland as Bradford stayed up by just two points.

He left the Bantams after turning down a new one-year contract as he felt he deserved a two-year deal. He joined Cambridge United in July 2000, playing a major role in keeping Cambridge in Division Two the following season. He left after one season (and one goal against Colchester in the Football League Trophy) and was linked with a return to Oxford United as player-coach in July 2001. Later that month he did join Oxford, but only on trial as a player, joining in with pre-season training and playing in a pre-season friendly. However, the Oxford board would not provide the money needed, claiming that they had no need for an extra defender, and on 4 August 2001 he signed for Conference side Stevenage Borough. In January 2002 he was linked with a move back to the Football League with Torquay United, but remained with Stevenage. He was caretaker manager of Stevenage for a spell in January 2003 alongside David Preece, winning 3 and drawing 1 of his first 4 games in charge. but left in May 2003 to seek a managerial position.

== Managerial career ==
In May 2003, Dreyer became manager of Maidenhead United, guiding the team to the quarter-finals of the FA Trophy and securing promotion in the new Conference South. Dreyer leaves Maidenhead in November 2004.

In December 2006, Dreyer was named as assistant manager of Rushden & Diamonds. taking the club from 2nd bottom of the Conference to 12th in less than 3 months. On 2 May 2008, Dreyer was named assistant manager to Graham Westley at Stevenage Borough, reaching the conference play-off semi-finals and winning the FA Trophy in 2009. In 2010 Stevenage won the conference title and reached the FA Trophy final at Wembley. In 2011 Stevenage won back-to-back promotions beating Torquay United in the League 2 play-off final at Old Trafford. Despite being well placed to achieve a third consecutive promotion, Dreyer followed Westley to Preston North End in January 2012, taking up the role of assistant manager. On 14 February 2013, Dreyer was named as Caretaker Manager of Preston North End following the departure of Graham Westley. Beating Eddie Howe's top of the table Bournemouth 2–0. Preston reach the League 1 play-off semi-finals, where they are beaten by eventual winners Rotherham United. Preston are promoted to the Championship, beating Swindon 4–0 at Wembley in the League 1 play-off final. In January 2016 Dreyer joins eventual League 2 champions Northampton Town on a short-term contract as Head of recruitment.

On 18 October 2017, Dreyer was appointed as assistant manager to Kevin Davies at Southport. However, he left the position on 20 December after not being able to fully commit to the role from his southern home.

In September 2018, Dreyer resigned as manager of Ware to concentrate on his business career.

On 15 October 2019 he became assistant at Oldham Athletic.

On 17 February 2022, following the permanent appointment of Dean Brennan, Dreyer was appointed assistant head coach of Barnet.

Dreyer was appointed assistant manager at Burton Albion ahead of the 2022–23 season. On 31 May 2024, Dreyer departed the club.

== Career statistics ==
Appearances and goals by club, season and competition
Club	Season	League			FA Cup		League Cup		Other^{[A]}		Total	
Club	Season	Division	Apps	Goals	Apps	Goals	Apps	Goals	Apps	Goals	Apps	Goals
Oxford United	1984–85	Second Division	0	0	0	0	0	0	0	0	0	0
Oxford United	1985–86	First Division	0	0	0	0	0	0	0	0	0	0
Oxford United	1986–87	First Division	25	2	1	0	3	0	1	0	30	2
Oxford United	1987–88	First Division	35	0	1	0	8	0	2	0	46	0
Oxford United	Total		60	2	2	0	11	0	3	0	76	2
Torquay United (loan)	1985–86	Fourth Division	5	0	0	0	0	0	0	0	5	0
Fulham (loan)	1985–86	Second Division	12	2	1	0	0	0	0	0	13	2
Luton Town	1988–89	First Division	18	1	0	0	5	0	1	0	24	1
Luton Town	1989–90	First Division	38	2	1	0	3	1	1	0	43	2
Luton Town	1990–91	First Division	38	3	3	0	2	0	3	1	46	4
Luton Town	1991–92	First Division	42	2	1	0	1	0	0	0	44	2
Luton Town	1992–93	First Division	38	2	2	0	1	0	1	0	42	2
Luton Town	1993–94	First Division	40	3	7	0	2	0	2	0	51	3
Luton Town	Total		214	13	14	0	14	1	8	1	250	15
Stoke City	1994–95	First Division	18	2	0	0	2	0	3	0	23	2
Stoke City	1995–96	First Division	19	0	1	0	0	0	2	1	22	1
Stoke City	1996–97	First Division	12	1	0	0	3	0	0	0	15	1
Stoke City	Total		49	3	1	0	5	0	5	1	60	4
Bolton Wanderers (loan)	1994–95	First Division	2	0	0	0	0	0	2	0	4	0
Bradford City	1996–97	First Division	28	1	3	3	0	0	0	0	31	4
Bradford City	1997–98	First Division	17	0	0	0	2	0	0	0	19	0
Bradford City	1998–99	First Division	21	0	0	0	5	0	0	0	26	0
Bradford City	1999–2000	Premier League	14	1	0	0	1	0	0	0	15	1
Bradford City	Total		80	2	4	3	8	0	0	0	92	5
Cambridge United	2000–01	Second Division	40	0	1	0	2	0	1	1	44	1
Stevenage Borough	2001–02	Conference National	24	0	0	0	0	0	1	0	25	0
Stevenage Borough	2002–03	Conference National	2	0	0	0	0	0	0	0	2	0
Stevenage Borough	Total		26	0	0	0	0	0	1	0	26	0
Career total			488	22	23	3	40	1	20	3	571	29

A. The "Other" column constitutes appearances and goals in the Anglo-Italian Cup, Full Members Cup, Football League play-offs and Football League Trophy.

== Honours ==
Bolton Wanderers

- Football League First Division play-offs: 1995
