= David Preece (footballer, born 1963) =

English footballer

Personal information
- Full name: David William Preece
- Date of birth: 28 May 1963
- Place of birth: Bridgnorth, Shropshire, England
- Date of death: 20 July 2007 (aged 44)
- Place of death: Luton, Bedfordshire, England
- Height: 5 ft 5 in (1.65 m)
- Position: Midfielder

Youth career
- 1978–1980: Walsall

Senior career*
Years	Team	Apps	(Gls)
1980–1984	Walsall	111	(5)
1984–1995	Luton Town	336	(21)
1995–1996	Derby County	13	(1)
1995	→ Birmingham City (loan)	6	(0)
1996	→ Swindon Town (loan)	7	(1)
1996–2001	Cambridge United	75	(2)
2001–2002	Torquay United	6	(0)
2002	Enfield	16	(0)
2002–2003	Stevenage Borough	0	(0)
2003	Enfield	15	(0)
Total		585	(30)

International career
1989	England B	3	(0)
- * Club domestic league appearances and goals

David William Preece (28 May 1963 – 20 July 2007) was an English professional footballer who played in midfield. He was born in Bridgnorth. He played three times for the England B team.

== Career ==
Preece began his career as an apprentice with Walsall, turning professional in July 1980. His debut came the following year, as a substitute in the 2–1 win against Chester City. He was signed by Luton Town manager David Pleat in December 1984 and scored on his debut, a 1–0 win at home to Aston Villa. He went on to win a League Cup winners medal with Luton in 1988 and played nearly 400 times for Luton's first team. He had a testimonial game against Manchester United in 1995 before moving to Derby County on a free transfer in August that year.

He was a bit-part player at Derby, and so he was loaned to both Birmingham City and Swindon Town. In September 1996 he joined Cambridge United on a free transfer. He made 75 appearances there and was appointed as manager Roy McFarland's assistant, before he joined Torquay United as a player/coach, again under McFarland in August 2001. His contract with Torquay was terminated in July 2002, a move which also led to McFarland's resignation, with Torquay chairman Mike Bateson claiming cuts were needed after the collapse of ITV Digital and subsequent reduction in income. He joined Enfield as a player, but left in December 2002 to become assistant manager of Stevenage Borough. However, a change of manager at Stevenage saw Preece return to Enfield as player-coach in February 2003.

In May 2003, Preece was appointed as first-team coach of Telford United. In September 2004 he was appointed as assistant manager of Isthmian League side Walton & Hersham.

Preece died in the early hours of 20 July 2007 after a short illness. At the time he had been in remission for one year following surgery for throat cancer.

The family stand at Luton's Kenilworth Road stadium has since been named The David Preece Stand in memory of him.

== Honours ==
Luton Town

- Football League Cup: 1987–88 runner-up: 1988–89
