= Julian James =

English footballer

Personal information
- Full name: Julian Colin James
- Date of birth: 22 March 1970 (age 56)
- Place of birth: Tring, England
- Position: Defender

Senior career*
Years	Team	Apps	(Gls)
1987–1998	Luton Town	327	(13)
1990	→Preston North End (loan)	6	(0)

International career
	England U21	2	(0)
- * Club domestic league appearances and goals

Julian Colin James (born 22 March 1970) is an English former footballer, best known for his time at Luton Town.

== Playing career ==
Julian James was spotted by Luton Town coach John Moore during the summer of 1987, playing local football with his home town team Tring Tornadoes. Moore organised a professional contract for the 17-year-old defender, and James signed for Luton soon after. He made his Luton Town debut on 7 May 1988, coming off the bench in a 1–1 draw with Southampton, and made two more substitute appearances during the 1987–88 season.

He made his first start on 2 November 1988, in a League Cup match at Elland Road, home of Leeds United. James's debut was a personal disaster, as he was sent off midway through the second half – however, Luton went on to win the game 2–0. He only made one more appearance during the 1988–89 season.

1989–90 proved to be a breakthrough for James, as he started 22 games for the club. His fine performances did not go unnoticed – he earned two caps for the England under-21s.

Still only 20, he was loaned out to Fourth Division Preston North End at the start of 1990–91, and made six appearances. He returned to Kenilworth Road and became Luton's regular centre back alongside John Dreyer, playing 25 times for Luton that season.

1991–92, Luton's last as a top flight club, saw James make 30 appearances, scoring twice. During 1992–93 he only missed three games all season, playing 44 times, and once again scoring two goals. James remained a rock in the centre of defence, and during 1993–94 also he played all but three games. James was ever-present as Luton made it to the semi-final of the FA Cup, where they lost 2–0 to Chelsea at Wembley Stadium.

By 1994–95, James was not only a regular in the team, but was considered, at the age of 24, one of the club's senior players. Three goals in 46 games saw James miss only four league games all year.

1995–96 saw another relegation, and when Terry Westley froze him out of the team James nearly left the club. However, Lennie Lawrence's arrival as manager brought James in from the cold, and James made 31 appearances that year.

James played 56 games during 1996–97, and was sent off twice – crucially, he was dismissed at Crewe Alexandra in the first leg of the play-off semi-final. Luton went on to lose, and promotion was not achieved.

1997–98 proved to be the defender's last season with the club. After making 26 appearances, a reckless challenge from Barry Hayles at Bristol Rovers broke James's leg in two places. The closest James ever came to a return was a spell with non-League Aylesbury United.
