= Marvin Johnson (footballer, born 1968) =

English footballer

Personal information
- Full name: Marvin Anthony Johnson
- Date of birth: 29 October 1968 (age 57)
- Place of birth: Wembley, England
- Height: 6 ft 0 in (1.83 m)
- Position: Defender

Youth career
- –1986: Luton Town

Senior career*
Years	Team	Apps	(Gls)
1986–2003	Luton Town	373	(7)

Managerial career
- 2008–2009: St Neots Town
- * Club domestic league appearances and goals

Marvin Anthony Johnson (born 29 October 1968) is an English former professional footballer who spent his entire career at Luton Town, playing as a defender.

== Playing career ==
Johnson signed professional terms with Luton Town on 12 November 1986 as an 18-year-old centre back who could also play as either a full back or midfielder. Johnson made his league debut for Luton on 5 March 1988, in a 2–0 loss against Wimbledon. His career spanned 16 years across the top four league divisions of England, experiencing three relegations and a promotion. Appointed as club captain during 1995–96, Johnson made a total of 440 appearances for Luton, 373 of which came in the league. Towards the end of his career Johnson was plagued by injuries, and he officially retired from playing in 2003.

== Coaching career ==
In 2002, with Johnson still registered as a player, he was appointed as assistant to youth team manager John Moore. A year later and with Johnson now retired, Moore moved on and Johnson became youth team manager himself, a position he retained until he was released from his contract by Kevin Blackwell in June 2007. During his tenure, he oversaw the development of players such as Curtis Davies, Leon Barnett and Kevin Foley, who have all since played in the Premier League.

Johnson spent the 2008–09 season as manager of non-league side St Neots Town, though he left the club after a 17th-placed finish in the United Counties Football League Premier Division.

On 20 December 2009, Johnson was appointed as the assistant manager of Conference National side Kettering Town.

Johnson is currently the Director of Coaching at Virginia Revolution Soccer Club and holds a UEFA 'A' license and a UEFA Coaching Level 'B' license.
