= Scott Oakes =

English footballer (born 1972)

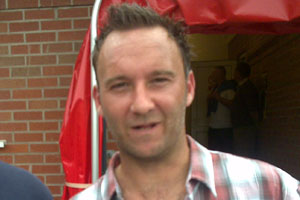

Personal information
- Full name: Scott John Oakes
- Date of birth: 5 August 1972 (age 54)
- Place of birth: Leicester, England
- Positions: Winger; attacking midfielder

Senior career*
Years	Team	Apps	(Gls)
1989–1991	Leicester City	2	(0)
1991–1996	Luton Town	173	(27)
1996–2000	Sheffield Wednesday	24	(1)
2000	Burnley	0	(0)
2000–2001	Cambridge United	18	(0)
2001	Leyton Orient	11	(0)
2002	St Albans City		
2003	Shelbourne	3	(0)
2003	St Albans City		
2008	Barton Rovers		
Total		231	(28)

International career
1993	England U21	1	(0)
Father	Trevor Oakes
Relatives	Stefan Oakes (brother)
- * Club domestic league appearances and goals

Scott John Oakes (born 5 August 1972) is an English former professional footballer who played as a winger and an attacking midfielder, best known from his time at Luton Town in the early 1990s.

== Career ==
Oakes began his career at Leicester City but was transferred to Luton in 1991 as part of the deal that took Steve Thompson the opposite way.

At Luton, Oakes soon became a regular in the side, and a fan favourite, usually playing on the left wing. During his time at Kenilworth Road, he became regarded as one of the most promising players in English football, and was often rumoured as a target for bigger clubs. He was capped once for England Under-21.

In 1996, Oakes was signed by Sheffield Wednesday for a £425,000 transfer fee. However, the move to the Owls would turn out disastrous. Following a spate of unfortunate injuries, Oakes spent most of his time on the sidelines in the 1996–97 season, and the following seasons he usually was not even on the bench due to a knee injury that cruelly dogged what had been a promising career at the age of just 25. In his four years at Hillsborough, Oakes started only seven games, scoring once against Sunderland, and in 1999–2000, his final season with the Owls, he did not feature for the first team at all.

In 2000, Oakes was released by Sheffield Wednesday and joined Burnley, and then moved to Cambridge United a mere three months later. He finished his Football League career with a spell at Leyton Orient before signing for non-league St Albans City in 2002.

In 2003, he signed for Shelbourne but only lasted three games due to the poor health of one of his children.

== Personal life ==
His younger brother Stefan Oakes is also a professional footballer.

His father is the musician Trevor Oakes, who performed with Showaddywaddy.

He now works teaching football to children in schools in Leicestershire and Bedfordshire.
