= Richard Harvey (footballer) =

English footballer

Personal information
- Full name: Richard George Harvey
- Date of birth: 1 April 1969 (age 57)
- Place of birth: Letchworth, England
- Height: 5 ft 9 in (1.75 m)
- Position: Defender

Youth career
- Luton Town

Senior career*
Years	Team	Apps	(Gls)
1987–1998	Luton Town	167	(4)
1992	→ Blackpool (loan)	5	(0)
- Aylesbury United

International career
1986	England Youth	2	(0)
- * Club domestic league appearances and goals

Richard George Harvey (born 1 April 1969 in Letchworth) is an English former footballer.

== Playing career ==
A product of the club's youth system, Harvey made his League debut on 1 November 1986 in a 1–0 home win over Queens Park Rangers. He eventually became a regular in the Luton side, but due to injuries he missed the best part of three years. Apart from a short loan spell at Blackpool in 1992, he stayed with Luton until 1998, when he left to join Aylesbury United. He also balanced his Luton career with the England Under 21s side, where he made appearances with the team in Rio de Janeiro's Maracanã stadium, Berlin's Olympic Stadium and London's Wembley Stadium.

== Post-career ==
Harvey is now a postman in his home town of Letchworth.
