= Ceri Hughes =

Welsh footballer

Personal information
- Date of birth: 26 February 1971 (age 55)
- Place of birth: Pontypridd, Wales
- Position: Midfielder

Senior career*
Years	Team	Apps	(Gls)
1989–1997	Luton Town	175	(17)
1997–2000	Wimbledon	31	(1)
2000–2002	Portsmouth	34	(2)
2002	Cardiff City	0	(0)
Total		240	(20)

International career
1992–1997	Wales	8	(0)
- * Club domestic league appearances and goals

Ceri Hughes (born 26 February 1971) is a Welsh former footballer who played as a midfielder. His clubs included Luton Town, for which he played for eight years, Wimbledon (where he scored once against Barnsley), Portsmouth (where he scored on his debut against Stockport County) and, lastly, Cardiff City where he made no first team appearances. He won eight caps for the Welsh national team, without scoring.
