= List of Luton Town F.C. seasons =

Luton Town Performances from 1897 until 2026

Luton Town Football Club is an English football club, founded in 1885. After becoming the first professional team in the south of England in 1891, Luton joined The Football League in 1897 before leaving three years later. The club rejoined the League in 1920, and reached its top division in 1955–56. After losing the 1959 FA Cup Final 2–1 to Nottingham Forest, a period of decline saw Luton in the Fourth Division by 1965. After a swift revival the club was back in Division Two by 1970. Luton earned another promotion four years later, returning to Division One for the 1974–75 season, in which Luton were relegated back to the Second Division.

Financial crises during the 1970s led to the sale of important players and it was not until David Pleat, a former Luton player, was appointed in 1978 that Luton started to recover. Pleat's team achieved promotion in 1981–82, and remained in Division One until 1992. Luton won the League Cup in the 1987–88 season with a 3–2 victory over Arsenal, but it marked the beginning of decline. Inconsistent performance and financial uncertainty meant that Luton rose and fell through the divisions from season to season, and in 2007 a collapse began that would result in three successive relegations. The club claimed a Football League Trophy victory in 2009, but with it came the relegation to the Conference Premier made inevitable by 40 points deducted in two seasons. Luton contested five years in non-League football, including three unsuccessful play-off campaigns, before winning promotion to League Two as Conference Premier champions in the 2013–14 season. The club were promoted to League One after finishing second in League Two in 2017–18, and the following season they won a second successive promotion to the Championship after winning the League One title. In the 2022-23 season Luton secured promotion to the Premier League by winning the Championship play off final on penalties against Coventry City at Wembley, however their stay in the top flight only lasted one season being relegated back to the Championship after a single season along with the other promoted clubs Burnley and Sheffield United. In the 2024-25 season Luton suffered a second successive relegation dropping down to League One for the first time since the 2018-19 season.

== Key ==
Champions	Runners-up	Promoted	Relegated

Top scorer and number of goals scored shown in bold when he was also top scorer for the division
Division shown in bold when it changes due to promotion, relegation or reorganisation
League results shown in italics for abandoned or wartime competitions

Key to league record

- Pld = Matches played
- W = Matches won
- D = Matches drawn
- L = Matches lost
- GF = Goals for
- GA = Goals against
- Pts = Points
- Pos. = Final position

Key to divisions

- Prem = Premier League
- Champ = EFL Championship
- Lge 1 = EFL League One
- Lge 2 = EFL League Two
- Div 1 = Football League First Division
- Div 2 = Football League Second Division
- Div 3 = Football League Third Division
- Div 3 S = Football League Third Division South
- Div 4 = Football League Fourth Division
- Conf Prem = Conference Premier
- South = Southern Football League Division One
- South 2 = Southern Football League Division Two
- United = United League
- West 1B = Western Football League Division 1B
- West 1A = Western Football League Division 1A

Key to rounds

- Grp = Group stage
- QR1 = Qualifying round 1
- QR2 = Qualifying round 2
- QR3 = Qualifying round 3
- QR4 = Qualifying round 4
- QR5 = Qualifying round 5
- QR6 = Qualifying round 6
- Int = Intermediate round
- R1 = Round 1
- R2 = Round 2
- R3 = Round 3
- R4 = Round 4
- R5 = Round 5
- R6 = Round 6
- QF = Quarter-finals
- SF = Semi-finals
- RU = Runners-up
- W = Winners
- S = Southern sector

== Seasons ==
Season	League									FA Cup	League Cup (Note: The League Cup competition started in the 1960–61 season.)	Other competitions		Top scorer(s) (Note: Includes goals scored in the Southern League, United League, The Football League (including play-offs), FA Cup, Football League Third Division South Cup, EFL Cup, Watney Cup, Anglo-Italian Cup, Texaco Cup, Full Members' Cup and Associate Members' Cup/Football League Trophy)	
Season	Division	Pld	W	D	L	GF	GA	Pts	Pos.	FA Cup	League Cup	Competition	Pos.	Player(s)	Goals
1885–86										R1		—	—	none	0
1886–87										R1		—	—	E. Ellingham	1
1887–88										R1		—	—	George Deacon	1
1888–89										QR3		—	—	J.C. Lomax	6
1889–90										QR3		—	—	Harry Whitby J.C. Lomax	1
1890–91										QR1		—	—	none	0
1891–92										R1		—	—	Harry Whitby	5
1892–93										QR3		—	—	Frank Whitby	4
1893–94										R1		—	—	Fred Allen Robert Dimmock	3
1894–95	South (Note: Luton Town were founder members of the Southern Football League.)	16	9	4	3	36	22	22	2nd	R1		—	—	Hugh Galbraith	16
1895–96	South	18	13	1	4	68	14	27	2nd	QR1		—	—	Hugh Galbraith	17
1896–97	United (Note: Luton Town left the Southern League to become founder members of the United League.)	14	10	1	3	52	16	21	2nd	R1		—	—	George Ekins	9
1897–98	Div 2 (Note: Luton were elected to the Football League Second Division. They continued to field a second side in the United League for two more seasons.)	30	13	4	13	68	50	30	8th	R1		—	—	Willie Stewart	12
1897–98	United	16	13	2	1	49	11	28	1st	R1		—	—	Willie Stewart	12
1898–99	Div 2	34	10	3	21	51	95	23	15th	QR5		—	—	James Kemplay	12
1898–99	United	20	2	3	15	24	71	7	11th	QR5		—	—	James Kemplay	12
1899–1900	Div 2	34	5	8	21	40	75	18	17th	QR5		—	—	John Brock	11
1900–01	South (Note: Luton resigned from The Football League and rejoined the Southern League.)	28	11	2	15	43	49	24	10th	Int		—	—	James Blessington Jimmy Durrant	11
1901–02	South	30	11	10	9	31	35	32	7th	Int		—	—	James Blessington	14
1902–03	South	30	10	7	13	43	44	27	11th	R1		—	—	Leon Gall	12
1903–04	South	34	14	12	8	38	33	40	8th	QR5		—	—	Jason McKee	9
1904–05	South	34	12	3	19	45	54	27	17th	QR6		—	—	David Ross	12
1905–06	South	34	17	7	10	64	40	41	4th	QR4		—	—	Sandy Brown	18
1906–07	South	38	18	9	11	52	52	45	4th	R2		—	—	Sandy Brown	15
1907–08	South	38	12	6	20	33	56	30	18th	R1		—	—	Herbert Moody	13
1907–08	West 1B (Note: Luton Town started to enter a team into the Western Football League as well as the Southern League in 1907, but this arrangement only lasted two seasons. 1907–08 was spent in Division 1B, 1908–09 in Division 1A.)	12	4	4	4	16	21	12	4th	R1		—	—	Herbert Moody	13
1908–09	South	40	17	6	17	59	60	40	9th	R1		—	—	Herbert Moody	15
1908–09	West 1A	12	5	2	5	24	24	12	4th	R1		—	—	Herbert Moody	15
1909–10	South	42	15	11	16	72	92	41	15th	QR4		—	—	Thomas Quinn	24
1910–11	South	38	15	8	15	67	63	38	9th	R1		—	—	Herbert Moody	25
1911–12	South	38	9	10	19	49	61	28	19th	R1		—	—	Herbert Moody	15
1912–13	South 2	24	13	4	7	52	39	30	5th	QR5		—	—	James Stephenson	10
1913–14	South 2	30	24	3	3	92	22	51	2nd	QR5		—	—	Ernie Simms Arthur Wileman	28
1914–15	South	38	13	8	17	61	73	34	14th	R1		—	—	Ernie Simms	30
1919–20	South	42	10	10	22	51	76	30	20th	R2		—	—	Ernie Simms	12
1920–21	Div 3 (Note: Luton were elected to the Football League Third Division.)	42	16	12	14	61	56	44	9th	R3		—	—	Ernie Simms	34
1921–22	Div 3 S	42	22	8	12	64	35	52	4th	R2		—	—	Ernie Simms	18
1922–23	Div 3 S	42	21	7	14	68	49	49	5th	R1		—	—	Syd Reid	18
1923–24	Div 3 S	42	16	14	12	50	44	46	7th	R1		—	—	Andy Kerr	20
1924–25	Div 3 S	42	10	17	15	49	57	37	16th	R1		—	—	George Dennis Syd Reid	12
1925–26	Div 3 S	42	18	7	17	80	75	43	7th	R2		—	—	Jimmy Thompson	25
1926–27	Div 3 S	42	15	14	13	68	66	44	8th	R3		—	—	Syd Reid	21
1927–28	Div 3 S	42	16	7	19	94	87	39	13th	R3		—	—	Jimmy Yardley	28
1928–29	Div 3 S	42	19	11	12	89	73	49	7th	R3		—	—	Andy Rennie	48
1929–30	Div 3 S	42	14	12	16	64	78	40	13th	R1		—	—	Andy Rennie Jimmy Yardley	17
1930–31	Div 3 S	42	19	8	15	76	51	46	7th	R2		—	—	Andy Rennie	20
1931–32	Div 3 S	42	20	7	15	95	70	47	6th	R3		—	—	Tommy Tait	27
1932–33	Div 3 S	42	13	13	16	78	78	39	14th	R6		—	—	Tommy Tait	23
1933–34	Div 3 S	42	21	10	11	83	61	52	6th	R3		Football League Third Division South Cup	R2	Andy Rennie	17
1934–35	Div 3 S	42	19	12	11	92	60	50	4th	R4		Football League Third Division South Cup	R2	Jack Ball	31
1935–36	Div 3 S	42	22	12	8	81	45	56	2nd	R4		Football League Third Division South Cup	R1	George Stephenson	14
1936–37	Div 3 S	42	27	4	11	103	53	58	1st	R4		Football League Third Division South Cup	QF	Joe Payne	58
1937–38	Div 2	42	15	10	17	89	86	40	12th	R5		—	—	Joe Payne	16
1938–39	Div 2	42	22	5	15	82	66	49	7th	R3		—	—	Hugh Billington	28
1939–40 (Note: Because of the outbreak of the Second World War, the 1939–40 season was abandoned in September and all results annulled. Three matches had been played.)	Div 2	3	2	1	0	7	1	5	–	n/a		—	—	Hugh Billington	5
1945–46	n/a (Note: During the first season after the Second World War, 1945–46, the Football League was not contested and all FA Cup ties were played over two legs.)	–	–	–	–	–	–	–	–	R3		—	—	none	0
1946–47	Div 2	42	16	7	19	71	83	39	13th	R5		—	—	Hugh Billington	28
1947–48	Div 2	42	14	12	16	56	59	40	13th	R5		—	—	Hugh Billington	14
1948–49	Div 2	42	14	12	16	55	57	40	10th	R5		—	—	Billy Arnison	19
1949–50	Div 2	42	10	18	14	41	51	38	17th	R3		—	—	George Stobbart	9
1950–51	Div 2	42	9	14	19	57	70	32	19th	R4		—	—	Willie Davie George Stobbart	9
1951–52	Div 2	42	16	12	14	77	78	44	8th	R6		—	—	Jack Taylor	24
1952–53	Div 2	42	22	8	12	84	49	52	3rd	R5		—	—	Jesse Pye	28
1953–54	Div 2	42	18	12	12	64	59	48	6th	R4		—	—	Gordon Turner	16
1954–55	Div 2	42	23	8	11	88	53	54	2nd	R5		—	—	Gordon Turner	37
1955–56	Div 1	42	17	8	17	66	64	42	10th	R3		—	—	Gordon Turner	19
1956–57	Div 1	42	14	9	19	58	76	37	16th	R3		—	—	Gordon Turner	35
1957–58	Div 1	42	19	6	17	69	63	44	8th	R3		—	—	Gordon Turner	38
1958–59	Div 1	42	12	13	17	68	71	37	17th	RU (Note: Luton Town's first appearance in a major final. Luton lost 2–1 to Nottingham Forest.)		—	—	Allan Brown	25
1959–60	Div 1	42	9	12	21	50	73	30	22nd	R5		—	—	Billy Bingham	16
1960–61	Div 2	42	15	9	18	71	79	39	13th	R5	R2	—	—	Gordon Turner	29
1961–62	Div 2	42	17	5	20	69	71	39	13th	R3	R2	—	—	Gordon Turner	21
1962–63	Div 2	42	11	7	24	61	84	29	22nd	R3	R4	—	—	Ron Davies	21
1963–64	Div 3	46	16	10	20	64	80	42	18th	R3	R2	—	—	John O'Rourke	22
1964–65	Div 3	46	11	11	24	51	94	33	21st	R3	R2	—	—	Tommy McKechnie	11
1965–66	Div 4	46	24	8	14	90	70	56	6th	R2	R1	—	—	John O'Rourke	34
1966–67	Div 4	46	16	9	21	59	73	41	17th	R2	R1	—	—	Bruce Rioch Ray Whittaker	11
1967–68	Div 4	46	27	12	7	87	44	66	1st	R2	R2	—	—	Bruce Rioch	27
1968–69	Div 3	46	25	11	10	74	38	61	3rd	R3	R3	—	—	Brian Lewis	23
1969–70	Div 3	46	23	14	9	77	43	60	2nd	R2	R3	—	—	Malcolm Macdonald	28
1970–71	Div 2	42	18	13	11	62	43	49	6th	R3	R3	Watney Cup	QF	Malcolm Macdonald	30
1971–72	Div 2	42	10	18	14	43	48	38	13th	R3	R2	—	—	Peter Anderson	10
1972–73	Div 2	42	15	11	16	44	53	41	12th	R6	R2	Anglo-Italian Cup	Grp	John Aston	12
1973–74	Div 2	42	19	12	11	64	51	50	2nd	R5	R4	—	—	Barry Butlin	18
1974–75	Div 1	42	11	11	20	47	65	33	20th	R3	R3	Texaco Cup	Grp	Adrian Alston	8
1975–76	Div 2	42	19	10	13	61	51	48	7th	R4	R2	—	—	Jimmy Husband	14
1976–77	Div 2	42	21	6	15	67	48	48	6th	R4	R2	—	—	Ron Futcher Jimmy Husband	13
1977–78	Div 2	42	14	10	18	54	52	38	13th	R4	R3	—	—	Phil Boersma Ron Futcher	10
1978–79	Div 2	42	13	10	19	60	57	36	18th	R3	QF	—	—	Brian Stein	14
1979–80	Div 2	42	16	17	9	66	45	49	6th	R3	R1	—	—	David Moss	24
1980–81	Div 2	42	18	12	12	61	46	48	5th	R4	R3	—	—	David Moss Brian Stein	19
1981–82	Div 2	42	25	13	4	86	46	88 (Note: The 1981–82 season saw the introduction of three points for a win.)	1st	R4	R2	—	—	Brian Stein	21
1982–83	Div 1	42	12	13	17	65	84	49	18th	R4	R4	—	—	Brian Stein	15
1983–84	Div 1	42	14	9	19	53	66	51	16th	R3	R2	—	—	Paul Walsh	14
1984–85	Div 1	42	15	9	18	57	61	54	13th	SF	R4	—	—	Mick Harford	16
1985–86	Div 1	42	18	12	12	61	44	66	9th	R6	R3	—	—	Mick Harford	25
1986–87	Div 1	42	18	12	12	47	45	66	7th (Note: Highest finish in the English football pyramid.)	R4	n/a (Note: Luton Town were disqualified from the 1986–87 League Cup for refusing to admit away fans following the 1985 Kenilworth Road riot.)	—	—	Mike Newell Brian Stein	13
1987–88	Div 1	40	14	11	15	57	58	53	9th	SF	W (Note: Defeated Arsenal 3–2)	Full Members' Cup	RU (Note: Lost 4–1 to Reading)	Mick Harford	21
1987–88	Div 1	40	14	11	15	57	58	53	9th	SF	W	Football League Centenary Tournament	R1	Mick Harford	21
1988–89	Div 1	38	10	11	17	42	52	41	16th	R3	RU (Note: Lost 3–1 to Nottingham Forest)	Full Members' Cup	R3	Roy Wegerle Danny Wilson	12
1989–90	Div 1	38	10	11	17	42	52	41	16th	R3	R3	Full Members' Cup	R2S	Kingsley Black Iain Dowie	11
1990–91	Div 1	38	10	7	21	42	61	37	18th	R4	R2	Full Members' Cup	SFS	Lars Elstrup	18
1991–92	Div 1	42	10	12	20	38	71	42	20th	R3	R2	Full Members' Cup	R2S	Mick Harford	12
1992–93	Div 1 (Note: Upon its formation before the 1992–93 season, the FA Premier League became the top tier of English football; the First, Second and Third Divisions then became the second, third and fourth tiers, respectively.)	46	10	21	15	48	62	51	20th	R4	R2	Anglo-Italian Cup	Grp	Phil Gray	20
1993–94	Div 1	46	14	11	21	56	60	53	20th	SF	R1	Anglo-Italian Cup	Grp	Scott Oakes	13
1994–95	Div 1	46	15	13	18	61	64	58	16th	R4	R1	—	—	Dwight Marshall	13
1995–96	Div 1	46	11	12	23	40	64	45	24th	R3	R1	Anglo-Italian Cup	Grp	Dwight Marshall	13
1996–97	Div 2	46	21	15	10	71	45	78	3rd (Note: Lost in the play-off semi-final to Crewe Alexandra, 4–3 on aggregate)	R3	R3	Football League Trophy	R2S	Tony Thorpe	31
1997–98	Div 2	46	14	15	17	60	64	57	17th	R1	R2	Football League Trophy	SFS	Tony Thorpe	19
1998–99	Div 2	46	16	10	20	51	60	58	12th	R2	QF	Football League Trophy	R2S	Phil Gray	13
1999–2000	Div 2	46	17	10	19	61	65	61	13th	R3	R1	Football League Trophy	R1S	Liam George	16
2000–01	Div 2	46	9	13	24	52	80	40	22nd	R3	R2	Football League Trophy	R1S	Liam George	9
2001–02	Div 3	46	30	7	9	96	48	97	2nd	R1	R1	Football League Trophy	R2S	Steve Howard	24
2002–03	Div 2	46	17	14	15	67	62	65	9th	R2	R2	Football League Trophy	QFS	Steve Howard	23
2003–04	Div 2	46	17	15	14	69	66	66	10th	R4	R2	Football League Trophy	QFS	Steve Howard	16
2004–05	Lge 1 (Note: Before the 2004–05 season, Football League re-branded Division One as the Football League Championship. Divisions Two and Three became Leagues One and Two, respectively.)	46	29	11	6	87	48	98	1st	R3	R1	Football League Trophy	R1S	Steve Howard	22
2005–06	Champ	46	17	10	19	66	67	61	10th	R3	R2	—	—	Steve Howard	15
2006–07	Champ	46	10	10	26	53	81	40	23rd	R4	R3	—	—	Rowan Vine	14
2007–08	Lge 1	46	11	10	25	43	63	33 (Note: 10 points deducted for entering administration)	24th	R3	R4	Football League Trophy	R2S	Paul Furlong Matthew Spring	12
2008–09	Lge 2	46	13	17	16	58	65	26 (Note: 30 points deducted—20 by the Football League, 10 by the FA—for various financial irregularities under past owners)	24th	R2	R2	Football League Trophy	W (Note: Defeated Scunthorpe United 3–2 after extra time (2–2 after 90 minutes))	Chris Martin	13
2009–10	Conf Prem	44	26	10	8	84	40	88	2nd (Note: Lost in the play-off semi-final to York City, 2–0 on aggregate)	R3	—	FA Trophy	R1	Tom Craddock	24
2010–11	Conf Prem	46	23	15	8	85	37	84	3rd (Note: Lost in the play-off final to AFC Wimbledon, 4–3 on penalties (0–0 after 90 minutes and extra time))	R2	—	FA Trophy	SF	Matthew Barnes-Homer	19
2011–12	Conf Prem	46	22	15	9	78	42	81	5th (Note: Lost to York City in the play-off final, 2–1)	R2	—	FA Trophy	SF	Stuart Fleetwood	16
2012–13	Conf Prem	46	18	13	15	70	62	67	7th (Note: Lowest finish in the English football pyramid.)	R5	—	FA Trophy	QF	Andre Gray	20
2013–14	Conf Prem	46	30	11	5	102	35	101	1st	R1	—	FA Trophy	R3	Andre Gray	30
2014–15	Lge 2	46	19	11	16	54	44	68	8th	R3	R1	Football League Trophy	R2S	Mark Cullen	14
2015–16	Lge 2	46	19	9	18	63	61	66	11th	R2	R2	Football League Trophy	R2S	Jack Marriott	16
2016–17	Lge 2	46	20	17	9	70	43	77	4th (Note: Lost in the play-off semi-final to Blackpool, 6–5 on aggregate)	R3	R2	EFL Trophy	SF	Danny Hylton	27
2017–18	Lge 2	46	25	13	8	94	46	88	2nd	R3	R1	EFL Trophy	R3S	Danny Hylton	23
2018–19	Lge 1	46	27	13	6	90	42	94	1st	R3	R1	EFL Trophy	R2S	James Collins	25
2019–20	Champ	46	14	9	23	54	82	51	19th	R3	R3	—	—	James Collins	14
2020–21	Champ	46	17	11	18	41	52	62	12th	R4	R3	—	—	James Collins	13
2021–22	Champ	46	21	12	13	63	55	75	6th (Note: Lost in the play-off semi-final to Huddersfield Town, 2–1 on aggregate)	R5	R1	—	—	Elijah Adebayo	17
2022–23	Champ	46	21	17	8	57	39	80	3rd (Note: Won in the play-off final to Coventry City, 6–5 on penalties (1–1 after 90 minutes and extra time))	R4	R1	—	—	Carlton Morris	20
2023–24	Prem	38	6	8	24	52	85	26	18th	R5	R3	—	—	Carlton Morris	11
2024–25	Champ	46	13	10	23	45	69	49	22nd	R3	R2	—	—	Carlton Morris	8
2025–26	Lge 1	46	21	11	14	68	56	74	7th	R2	R1	EFL Trophy	W (Note: Defeated Stockport County 3–1)	Jordan Clark	12
