= History of Luton Town F.C. (1885–1970) =

History of an English football club

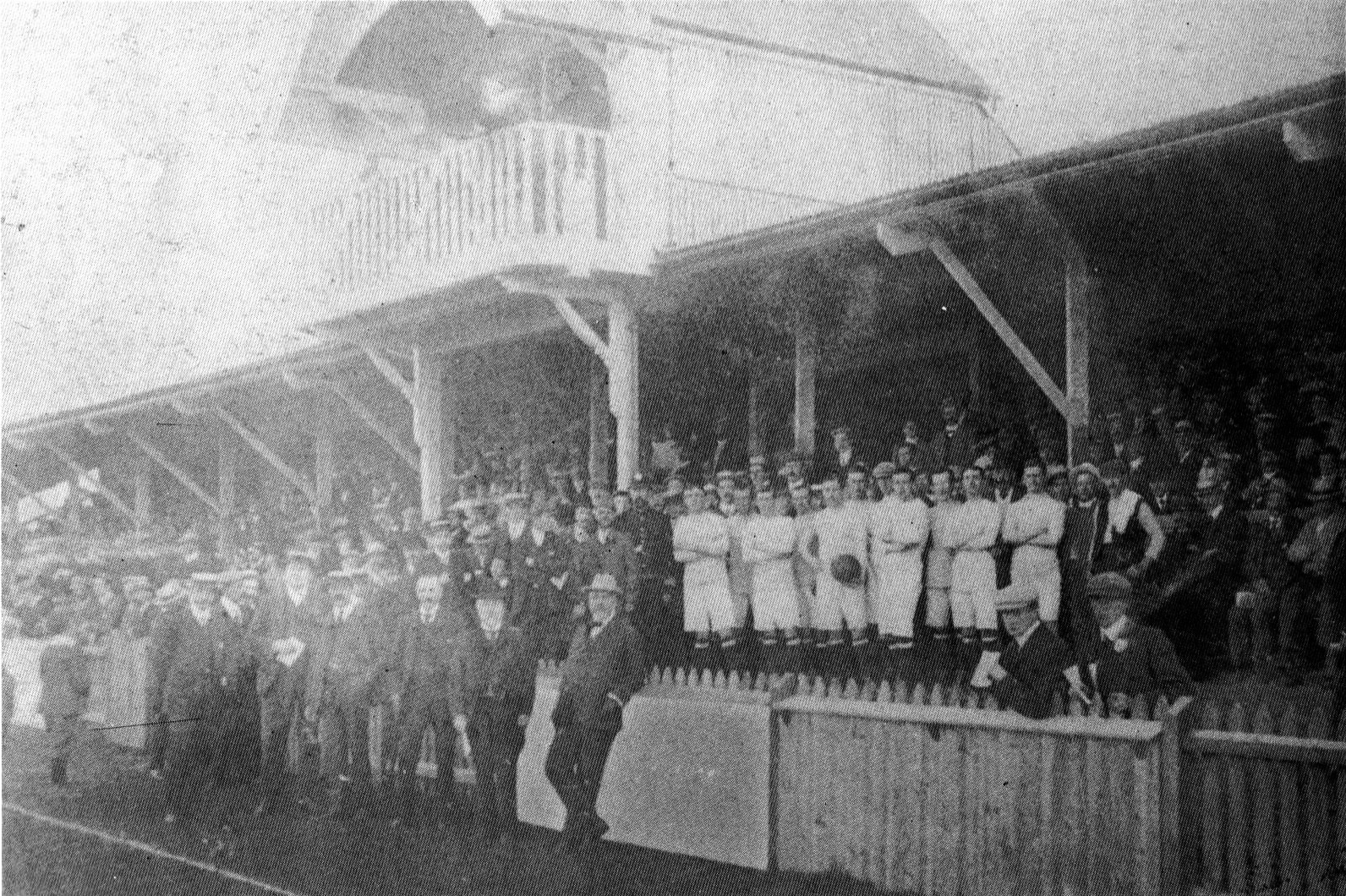
The opening of Kenilworth Road on 4 September 1905

Luton Town Football Club is an English professional football club based in the town of Luton, Bedfordshire. Founded in 1885, Luton Town were the first professional team in the south of England, fully professional by 1891. Luton were also one of the first southern Football League clubs, joining in 1897 before leaving again in 1900 due to financial instability. The club rejoined the League for the 1920–21 season. George Thompson became the club's first manager four years later, but only lasted eight months before leaving, and wasn't replaced until 1927. 1936–37 saw Luton promoted to the Second Division, and the first post-war seasons saw a strong Luton team begin to emerge. Record goalscorer Gordon Turner's arrival into the first team in 1950 helped Luton to promotion to the First Division for the first time in 1954–55, and the team remained there until relegation in the 1959–60 season. Luton also reached the 1959 FA Cup Final, where Turner's absence and the team's questionable preparation for the game meant that Luton lost 2–1 to Nottingham Forest. The club was subsequently relegated three times in six seasons, reaching the Fourth Division by 1965–66. However, players such as Malcolm Macdonald ensured that the club was then promoted twice in three years and was back in the Second Division by 1970.

== Creation, professionalism and The Football League (1885–1900) ==
Luton Town Football Club was formed on 11 April 1885. Before this there were many clubs in the town, the most prominent of which were Luton Wanderers and Luton Excelsior. A Wanderers player, George Deacon, came up with the idea of a "Town" club which would include all the best players in Luton. Wanderers secretary Herbert Spratley seized upon Deacon's idea and arranged a secret meeting on 13 January 1885 at the St Matthews school rooms in High Town. The Wanderers committee resolved to rename the club Luton Town – which was not well received by the wider community. The local newspapers referred to the club as "Luton Town (late Wanderers)". When George Deacon and John Charles Lomax then arranged a public meeting with the purpose of forming a "Luton Town Football Club", Spratley protested, saying there was already a Luton Town club; and the atmosphere was tense when the meeting convened in the town hall on 11 April 1885. The meeting, attended by most football lovers in the town, heard about Spratley's secret January meeting and voted down his objections. The motion to form a "Luton Town Football Club", put forward by G H Small and seconded by E H Lomax, was carried. A club committee was elected by ballot and the team colours were agreed to be pink and dark blue shirts and caps. The club's early years saw around 35 matches played between October and the following Easter. Most of these were friendlies arranged by the club's secretary, but Luton also competed in the FA Cup. The team had little success – it was not until the 1891–92 season that Luton reached the first round proper.

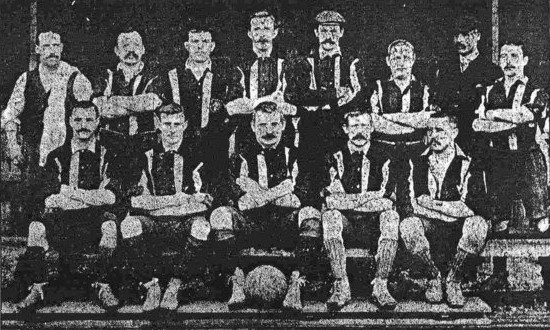
The Luton Town squad of 1897–98 which won the United League

Luton's first achievement was perhaps to become the first professional club in the south of England, at a time when professionalism was mainly restricted to the north. Most players had to work on a Saturday morning and were often late for a game, which annoyed the crowd. It also meant shortened games in the dark winter months. On 15 December 1890, a salary of five shillings per week was offered to three players – Frank Whitby, Harry Whitby and Tom Read – to replace their lost earnings for Saturday morning, to ensure they arrived at the game on time. Harry Whitby and Thomas Read were the first to sign and thus became the first professional footballers in the south. Frank Whitby held out for a shilling a week more than his brother, but did not get it and eventually signed a month after his brother. In August 1891 it was decided to pay the whole team two shillings and sixpence per week, plus expenses. Woolwich Arsenal became the second professional club in southern England a few weeks later.

Luton Town were founder members of the Southern Football League in 1894–95 – the club's first competitive league match was on 6 October 1894 – a 4–3 home defeat to Millwall Athletic, who went on to win the inaugural championship as Luton finished as runners-up. The next season, 1895–96, saw Luton come second again as Millwall retained the championship. The sparse programme of league matches was still supplemented by numerous friendly matches at this time. After the two successive runners-up finishes, Luton applied to join the Football League's Second Division in 1896. When the club was not elected, Luton Town instead helped to form the United League. With only eight members, the United League was a short-lived failure and produced a damaging financial loss for the club – in the league's inaugural season, Luton finished second behind Millwall for the third consecutive year.

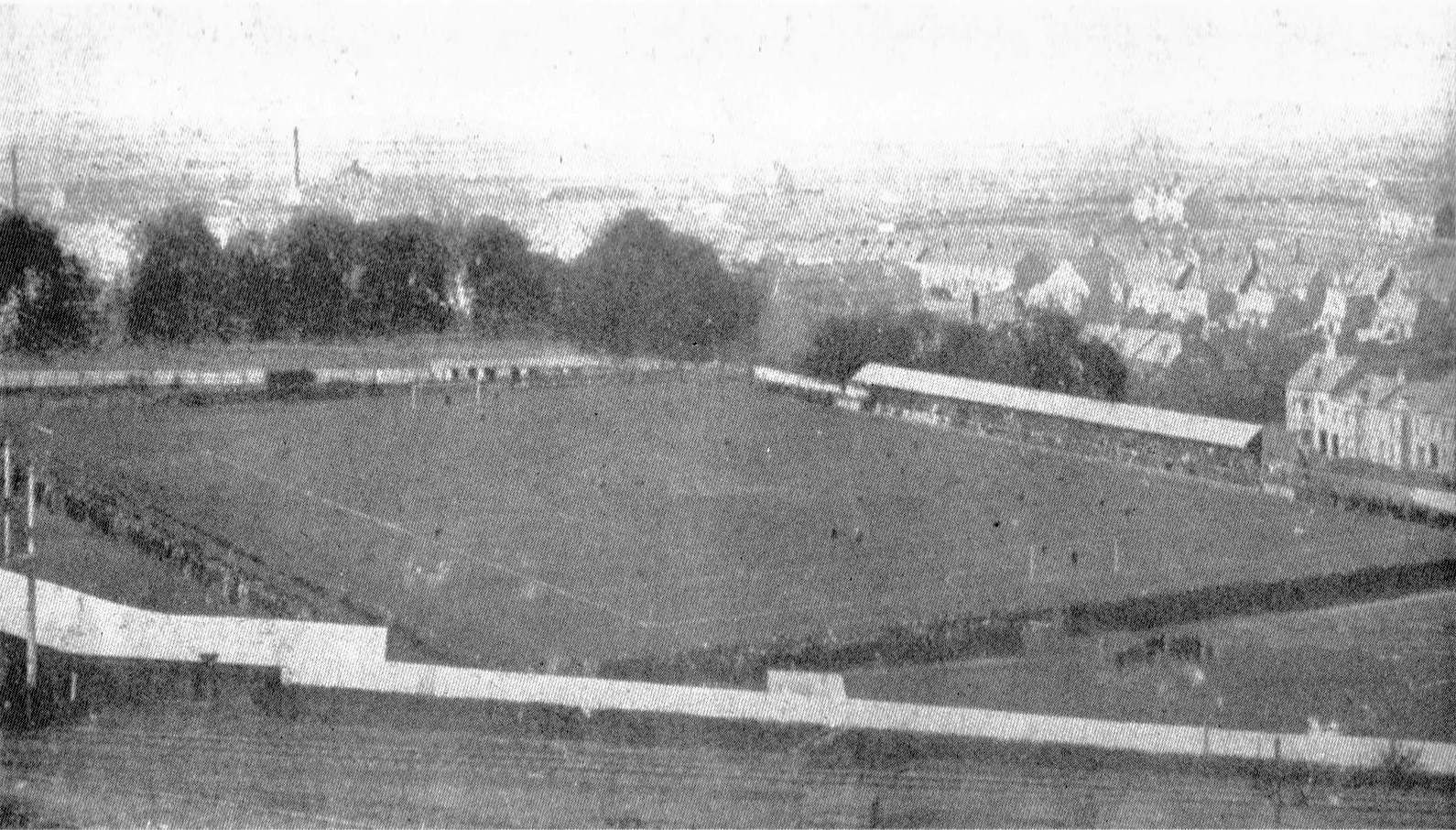
Dunstable Road

Council plans to build a school on the site of the Dallow Lane ground caused the club to relocate to Dunstable Road in 1897 and to become a limited company. The following summer, Luton Town applied once again to the Football League, and this time were elected to the Football League Second Division for the 1897–98 season. During the club's first Football League campaign, moderate success was enjoyed, and the team also won the United League. The second season in the League was considered a failure, as Luton finished 15th – the 17th-place finish in the third was considered so disastrous that the club did not even apply for re-election. With wages rising beyond the club's financial means, attendances falling and most of the club's turnover being spent on accommodation and transport to away matches in the north, it was decided that for the club to continue, it would be necessary to return to the Southern League.

== Back to the Southern League (1900–1919) ==
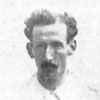
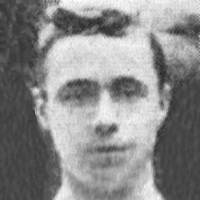
Bob Hawkes (left) and Fred Hawkes (no relation, right) represented Luton for 19 and 21 years respectively.

The 1900–01 season was winger Bob Hawkes's first. In the 1900–01, 1901–02 and 1902–03 seasons Luton Town finished 10th, seventh and 11th respectively, finally making a profit for the first time since turning professional in 1903. The 1904–05 season saw Luton finish 17th – second from bottom – and to make matters worse, the club was told to leave the Dunstable Road ground at short notice. The club's directors quickly found a new site and the 1905–06 season kicked off at a new ground at Kenilworth Road. The side was re-elected unanimously to the Southern League, and Luton's first season at the club's new home was a success, seeing the team finish fourth, a feat that was repeated the following season. Meanwhile, Hawkes, in his second season as captain, was chosen to play for England, and in doing so became Luton's first international player.

The Luton Town team of 1909–10

For the 1907–08 season, a new set of forwards were signed but goals were still hard to come by. Despite possessing a strong half back line made up of Hawkes, Fred Hawkes and Fred White, the club slumped to 18th place and made a financial loss. The following year the team recovered to ninth place, but the financial situation worsened. The forwards finally found the goal in 1909–10, but too many goals were let in at the other end and the club finished 15th. The continuing financial problems caused the sale of forward pair John Smith and Thomas Quinn to Millwall. By 1910–11 gates were up, finances were being brought under control and the club challenged for the title before eventually finishing in ninth place. Optimism was in the air at the start of the 1911–12 season, but it was to finish in tragedy – popular full-back Sammy Wightman died from injuries sustained in a match against Brighton & Hove Albion, and a high wage bill, a spate of injuries and a lack of goals contributed to the club being relegated to the Southern League's Second Division.

The club planned to bounce straight back in the 1912–13 season, but even with a team of strong new players the team could only finish fifth. The formation of the Luton Town Supporters Club, who raised £60 during the season, helped the club to stem the financial losses. In 1914 the side finished second and were promoted back to the First Division, just as the First World War was about to begin. The 1914–15 season was the last complete season before competitive sport was mostly abandoned. Most war-time games were friendlies, but while Luton competed in the London Combination, Ernie Simms, who had been wounded during the war, achieved the feat of scoring 40 goals during 1916–17.

== Rejoining The Football League (1919–1937) ==
The Luton Town team of 1919–20, the final Southern League season

In the first season following the conflict, 1919–20, not even return of Ernie Simms could stop Luton finishing 20th in the Southern League. Fortunately for Luton, no clubs were relegated that season; instead, Luton joined the new Football League Third Division, and replaced the blue, white and navy kit with a new colour scheme – white shirts, black shorts and black socks.

Feeling confident of promotion from the new division, Luton finished ninth in 1920–21 and enjoyed a good cup run. 17,754 fans saw the FA Cup defeat by Preston North End, setting a club attendance record in doing so. Simms scored 34 goals during the season to top-score for the club. Such was the quality of Luton's squad that three Luton players played in a single international at Windsor Park on 22 October 1922 – Louis Bookman and Allan Mathieson for Ireland, and Ernie Simms for England. Despite Luton's playing resources, the side disappointingly finished only fourth. The main stand was destroyed in a fire and rebuilt before the start of the 1922–23. As the club finished fifth, seventh and then 17th, hopes of quick promotion disappeared.

The 1925–26 season saw the appointment of Luton's first manager, George Thompson. The club finished eighth, while Thompson departed after just eight months in charge, "scalded by the experience". He was not replaced until 1927. The following season saw another eighth-place finish and following a shareholder revolt, there was a boardroom clear-out. Only the club's long-serving chairman, Harry Arnold, survived.

The boardroom changes created optimism in 1927–28 that was again dashed with a 13th-place finish. Meanwhile, a former player from the 1890s, John McCartney, was appointed manager. It was a high-scoring season that saw the club scoring 94, but conceding 87 – on Boxing Day, Luton led 5–1 only to lose 5–6. The following year saw McCartney guide his team to seventh with help from young Scotsman Andy Rennie, who switched from centre-half to centre-forward and scored 43 goals in 41 matches. McCartney suffered from persistent ill-health, and was replaced by assistant George Kay in December 1929. His team slumped to 13th place, but improved in 1930–31 to seventh.

Before the 1931–32, Kay left to manage Southampton and was replaced by Harold Wightman. Despite the presence of skilful players such as Frederick Kean, Charles Fraser and Rennie, the club was beset with injuries and finished sixth. The following season Luton finished 14th, perhaps distracted by a cup run which was finally ended by the eventual winners, Everton, in the sixth round. Charles Jeyes, who had served on the board for six years, became chairman in the 1933 off-season and secured the purchase of the club's Kenilworth Road ground. The Bobbers Stand was constructed that same year, and 18,641 spectators saw Luton beaten in the cup by Arsenal. Promotion still eluded Luton, and the club was also denied promotion in 1934–35. The club finished fourth, largely due to the sale of two vital players, Bill Brown and Sam Bell, and a terrible injury to Fraser.

The 1935–36 season started poorly, Harold Wightman resigned in October 1935. With team affairs controlled by the directors, the club went unbeaten for five months before being knocked out of the cup by Manchester City in January. On 13 April 1936, young Joe Payne was drafted into the first team due to injuries and scored ten goals during a 12–0 defeat of Bristol Rovers – as of 2013, Payne's achievement of ten goals in a match is still a Football League record. The directors recruited Ned Liddle to fill the vacant manager's position in August 1936 – the team finally won promotion on 1 May 1937 with a 2–0 victory over Torquay United. Payne scored both goals that day, and 55 goals in 39 games over the season as Luton Town won the Third Division South for the first time. The club also beat its traditional rival Watford, both at home and away. The clubs would not meet again in the league until 1963–64.

== The Second Division (1937–1955) ==
Hugh Billington, whose career was interrupted by the Second World War

The 1937–38 season was tough for the club: Luton's opening home matches were against Aston Villa, Manchester United and Tottenham Hotspur. Luton battled relegation for much of the season but finished 12th and reached the fifth round of the FA Cup, losing 3–1 to Manchester City. Late in the season, manager Ned Liddle left to join Chelsea (as a scout), as did star forward Joe Payne days later. Payne's replacement was local boy Hugh Billington, who scored 28 goals during the final season before the outbreak of war, 1938–39. The club finished in seventh place under new manager Neil McBain, but disagreements between McBain and the board saw the Scotsman leave after just one season. George Martin was appointed as coach; his Luton team was unbeaten over the first three games of the 1939–40 season and thus top of the Second Division on the day that the Second World War broke out.

The Football League resumed in 1946–47 – Martin, who had been promoted to manager in 1944, brought in Dally Duncan, a former Scottish international, as player-coach. Martin moved to Newcastle United at the end of an inconsistent season, and in his place Duncan was promoted to manager. The next four seasons were a transitional period in which ageing pre-war players were gradually replaced by a younger generation, often by means of unpopular sales of the best talents: Hugh Billington, Frank Soo, Billy Hughes and Bob Brennan were all sold for big fees. In their place came the new breed of Luton player – South African forward Billy Arnison became a crowd favourite before injury forced him to return home, and home-grown talent such as Bob Morton and Gordon Turner saw a new Luton line-up start to emerge.

Bob Morton (left) and Gordon Turner (right) starred for Luton during the 1950s.

After a large financial loss and declining attendances, optimism was not high at the start of the 1951–52 season. However, performances were boosted by the debut of Gordon Turner and by the growing maturity of players like Syd Owen, Charlie Watkins and Bob Morton. Luton Town challenged for promotion before finishing eighth and again reached the sixth round of the FA Cup. 1952–53 marked the signing of Jesse Pye. Luton made a poor start in the league but then went on a run of excellent results. It was enough to finish third, the club's highest league finish at that time. Pye fractured his ankle in December 1953 and sat out the rest of the season; many fans believed the club would have won promotion had he stayed fit. As it was, the club finished sixth.

After 21 years as chairman, chairman Charles Jeyes stepped down in 1954. In 1954–55, during replacement Percy Mitchell's first season as chairman, promotion to the top flight finally came. Jesse Pye had moved to Derby County after just eight games, but Turner had by then matured enough to fill Pye's boots. Turner scored a new club record of 32 league goals in 42 appearances as a side boasting the talents of Owen, Ron Baynham and Morton as well as Turner's own marched to promotion. On 30 April 1955, the side won 3–0 at Doncaster Rovers and thus secured promotion in second place, behind Birmingham City on goal average. Mitchell boasted that the club would be able stay in the top flight, and planned to build a new ground that would "hold 35,000 in comfort … [and] get a lot of support which goes to London at the moment".

== Into the top-flight (1955–1960) ==
Syd Owen led the club to the 1959 FA Cup Final and was voted PFA Players' Player of the Year at the end of that season.

The backbone of the 1954–55 promotion team was retained for the club's first top-flight season and many fine performances contributed to a 10th-place finish in 1955–56. Captain Syd Owen replaced Tom Kelly as coach, but lost three months of the season as a player after a thigh injury. Other injuries and spells of bad luck put paid to the possibility of challenging for the title. There was only one big signing during the following season, as the club relied on youth development to finish a respectable 16th; Allan Brown arrived in February from Blackpool for a fee of £8,000. Meanwhile, Turner scored 30 league goals and 33 over the following season as the club rose to eighth place in the First Division.

Luton's cup exploits of 1958–59 disguised the beginnings of an era of decline. Dally Duncan's team was beginning to show its age – Syd Owen was already 37 and taking on coaching responsibilities. Duncan left for Blackburn Rovers in October 1958, and for the rest of the season team affairs were managed by a committee made up of club directors and coaching staff. The club struggled to a 17th-place finish, but in the FA Cup Luton enjoyed unprecedented success. Luton accomplished the rare feat of fielding the same team of eleven players all the way through to the FA Cup Final. Gordon Turner had lost his place through injury problems earlier on in the season, and when the choice was made by the directors to name an unchanged team for the final, thus leaving Turner out, there was much controversy. Luton had beaten Forest 5–1 just weeks before, but on cup final day, the Luton team was beaten 2–1.

The Cup Final was Syd Owen's last match for Luton, as he was chosen to take over as manager for the 1959–60 season. His one season at the helm was a catastrophe for the club – Owen complained that the club's directors were denying him control over transfers while at the same time signing players behind his back, and resigned over the matter in April 1960. Meanwhile, Luton Town were relegated back to the Second Division, finishing bottom with just 30 points from 42 games.

== Decline and recovery (1960–1970) ==
Sam Bartram, a former player, was appointed manager in July 1960. The club had a long list of injured or unsettled players on its books and many old favourites from the First Division years were sold. The abolition of the maximum wage in football hit the club's finances hard. Attendances dwindled, and the club finished 13th in 1960–61. The following season saw a remodelled team again finish 13th. Attendances had dropped to dangerous levels and the club was losing £400 a week. Bartram left at the end of the season; Jack Crompton was appointed manager on 29 June 1962 but resigned six days later citing his doctor's instructions. An increasingly desperate search for a manager ended with the appointment of Bill Harvey late in July. Harvey could do nothing to stop the club's decline – Luton finished with just 29 points as the team was relegated to the Third Division. Mitchell was subsequently replaced as chairman by Tom Hodgson. The club was already in serious relegation trouble in December 1963 when the signing of a young goalscorer, John O'Rourke, helped improve performances. O'Rourke scored both goals in the last home game of the season against rivals Watford, preventing the Hertfordshire club's promotion and guaranteeing Luton's survival.

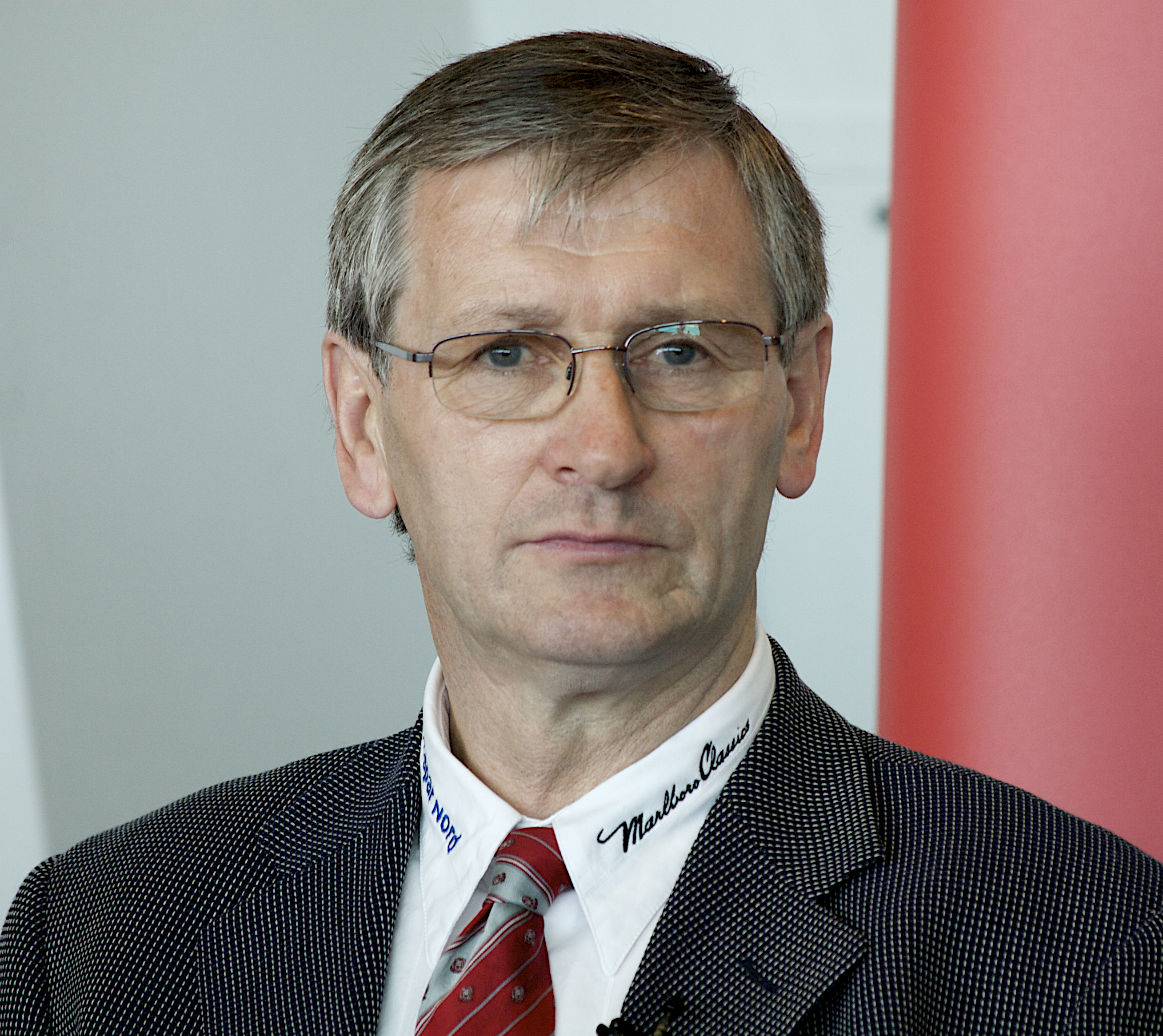
Bruce Rioch's goals helped Luton to the Division Four championship.

Poor results continued in the 1964–65 season. Harvey resigned as manager and was eventually replaced by George Martin, returning for his second spell as Luton manager. Luton finished 21st and were relegated to the Fourth Division for the first time in the club's history. 1965–66 saw Martin set out to improve discipline, and results improved dramatically – Luton finished sixth. The following season then marked the club's lowest ever league finish, but also the beginning of a recovery. Results were initially poor; Allan Brown took over as manager in November as Martin moved on for a second time. The club was second from bottom of the Football League when Luton lost 8–1 to Lincoln in December, but the team steadily improved in the new year. Luton finished 17th and attendances doubled in just a few months.

By the end of 1967 Luton, led by ever-present captain Terry Branston, were a team transformed. Luton notched up 66 points during 1967–68 to equal the division record, and scored 87 goals. Average attendances jumped from 5,364 to 12,400, which helped the club's directors to turn down offers from bigger clubs for free-scoring Bruce Rioch, who scored the only goal at Halifax Town on 20 April 1968 to clinch promotion. Four days later Luton beat Crewe Alexandra in front of 19,000 at Kenilworth Road to seal the Fourth Division championship.

The 1968–69 campaign was a frustrating season that saw Luton finish third, narrowly missing out on a second consecutive promotion. Brown resigned as manager in December 1968 under pressure from the board, and was replaced by Alec Stock, who brought Malcolm Macdonald to the club in the summer of 1969. Macdonald was moved from defence to centre-forward with marvellous success, scoring 25 goals as Luton stormed to a second-place finish in 1969–70. Comedian Eric Morecambe became a director of the club in 1970, and promotion back to the Second Division was clinched on the final day of the season with a tight 1–0 win over Southport.

== Continuation ==
- History of Luton Town F.C. (1970–present) for the club's history since 1970.
