= Syd Reid =

Welsh footballer

Personal information
- Full name: Sydney Reid
- Date of birth: 27 September 1900
- Place of birth: Cannock, England
- Date of death: 7 October 1968 (aged 68)
- Position: Striker

Senior career*
Years	Team	Apps	(Gls)
–1922	Troed-y-rhiw Star		
1922–1928	Luton Town	133	(70)
1928–????	Luton Amateurs		
- * Club domestic league appearances and goals

Sydney "Syd" Reid (born in Cannock) was an English-born Welsh professional footballer, who played for English club Luton Town.

== Playing career ==
Reid moved with his family from Cannock to Pentrebach as a child and played his early football with his local club Troed-y-rhiw Star, but turned professional in March 1922 when Luton Town brought him to England to bolster their forward line. He made his debut for Luton on 18 March 1922, in a 1–1 draw at Brighton & Hove Albion. He played ten more games during the rump end of the 1921–22 season, and scored his first Luton goal in his third match, a 1–1 draw with Watford at Kenilworth Road on 1 April. His second goal came a week later, in the return fixture at Vicarage Road as Luton lost 4–1. He ended the season with two goals from 11 matches.

Reid's English football career took off during 1922–23, his first full season in Bedfordshire. He scored four goals during a 6–1 demolition of Swansea Town on 24 January, and in doing so scored his first hat-trick for the club. He finished the campaign as Luton's top scorer, with 18 goals from 33 matches. Injuries ruled him out for the majority of 1923–24 as well as the first three months of 1924–25 — however, he still finished as the club's joint top scorer with 12 in 26 games. 1925–26 saw only fleeting appearances from Reid, but by 1926–27 he was back as he top scored once again with 21 goals. A haul of 19 during 1927–28 proved to be a last hurrah — Luton now had two prolific goalscorers in Andy Rennie and Jimmy Yardley, and decided to let the injury-prone Reid go. After 81 goals in only 143 professional matches, Reid ended his playing days with Luton Amateurs.
