= Dallow Lane =

Football ground in Luton, England

- Interactive map of Dallow Lane
- Full name: Dallow Lane
- Location: Luton, Bedfordshire, England
- Coordinates: 51°52′54.35″N 0°25′36.07″W
- Owner: Excelsior F.C. (1880–85); Luton Town F.C. (1885–97)
- Operator: Excelsior F.C. (1880–85); Luton Town F.C. (1885–97)
- Capacity: ca. 7,000
- Surface: Grass

Construction
- Built: 1880
- Opened: 1880
- Closed: 1897
- Demolished: ca. 1950

Dallow Lane was a football ground in Luton, England. It was the home ground of Luton Town from its formation in 1885 until a move to Dunstable Road in 1897.

== History ==
The first organised match of association football in Luton took place at Dallow Lane on 23 October 1880 – a fifteen-a-side match between Excelsior and Luton Rovers. Excelsior, a local works team, emerged as 2–0 victors and remained at the ground until the merger with Luton Town Wanderers in 1885 to become Luton Town Football Club. The new club decided to base itself at Excelsior's Dallow Lane.

Dallow Lane, also known as the Excelsior Ground, had a capacity of about 7,000 – most spectators would simply stand behind a rope close to the pitch, and there was a seated grandstand constructed in 1894. The stand was "120 feet long, 18 feet high, 13 feet deep and [had] five tiers of seats". Due to Dallow Lane's close proximity to the Luton to Dunstable railway line, players claimed to have trouble playing due to smoke from the engines. The club made a damaging financial loss during 1896–97 and was forced to sell the ground to stay afloat. Luton Town left Dallow Lane in April to play at Dunstable Road. The Dallow Lane grandstand remained on the site until the mid-20th century, used as a store shed.
