= 1885–86 Luton Town F.C. season =

English football club season

Luton Town
1885–86 season
- Chairman: none
- Manager: none
- FA Cup: First Round
- Top goalscorer: League: no league entered All: no goals scored
Home colours

The 1885–86 season was the first season in the history of Luton Town Football Club. The club had been in existence for less than three months on the season's start, and as Luton did not enter any league competition the team's first competitive match came on 31 October, an FA Cup tie against Great Marlow which was lost 3–0.

This article covers the period from 1 July 1885 to 30 June 1886.

== Background ==
Luton Town Football Club was formed on 11 April 1885 at a meeting convened "for the purpose of considering the advisability of forming a town football club". The new club was a merger of the two leading local teams, Luton Town Wanderers and Excelsior; Excelsior's Dallow Lane became the home stadium of the new club. Some of the Wanderers players were not enthusiastic, as they had extended their name to Luton Town Wanderers only three months before; these players made the decision to continue separately to the newly amalgamated club. Despite this, Luton Town's early line-ups consisted of six players from one of the former clubs and five from the other.

== Review ==
Luton Town played only one competitive match during the season, an FA Cup first round tie at Great Marlow which was lost 3–0.

== Match results ==
Luton Town results given first.

=== Legend ===
| Win | Draw | Loss |

=== FA Cup ===
| Round | Date | Opponent | Venue | Result | Attendance | Goalscorers | Notes |
|---|---|---|---|---|---|---|---|
| 1st Round | 31 October 1885 | Great Marlow | Away | 0–3 | 500 | — | |

== Player details ==
As the match played on 31 October 1885 was the only competitive game of the season, this section merely details that match's line-up.

| Goalkeeper | Defenders | Midfielders | Forwards |
|---|---|---|---|
| (England) John Long | (England) J.G. Hunt | (England) B. Barrett | (England) George Deacon |
| | (England) A. Martin | (England) T. Lawrence | (England) Albert Deacon |
| | | (England) Ernest Lomax | (England) J.C. Lomax |
| | | | (England) G.H. Small |
(England) Frank Whitby

== See also ==
- 1885–86 in English football
