= Allan Mathieson =

Irish footballer

Personal information
- Date of birth: 1897
- Place of birth: Belfast, Ireland
- Position: Inside left

Youth career
- Glentoran

Senior career*
Years	Team	Apps	(Gls)
1918–1919	Glentoran	3	(0)
1919–1922	Luton Town	56	(16)
1922–1923	Exeter City	26	(4)
1923–1927	New Brighton	128	(37)
1930	Toronto Ulster United		

International career
1921	Ireland	2	(0)
- * Club domestic league appearances and goals

Allan Mathieson (born 1897, date of death unknown) was an Irish football player, notable at Luton Town and New Brighton.

== Career ==
Born in Belfast, Mathieson emerged with Glentoran in the Irish League in the immediate post-Great War period. Although he would not have been considered large today, at the time he was considered a giant of a man, with a wide frame and standing at 5 ft 11 in. Despite this, he became known as a tactical player with delicate footwork and skill. He reached the Irish Cup Final in 1919, as an inside-left for Glentoran, but after three matches Glentoran lost to rivals Linfield.

Mathieson was transferred to English Third Division South side Luton Town in September 1919, and soon set up a forward partnership with fellow Irish International Louis Bookman and Ernie Simms.

The highlight of his playing career was when he ran out for Ireland twice in 1921. His second game, against England on 22 October, saw three Luton Town forwards all on the pitch at the same time – the first time one club had contributed three forwards to one International match. Louis Bookman was playing alongside Mathieson for Ireland, and Ernie Simms was up front for England.

After playing for Exeter City and New Brighton, Mathieson emigrated to Canada, and played in both Canada and the United States. Throughout his time in Canada he played in the National Soccer League with Toronto Ulster United in 1930.
