= Jimmy Yardley =

Scottish footballer

Personal information
- Full name: James Yardley
- Date of birth: 16 April 1903
- Place of birth: Wishaw, Scotland
- Date of death: 1959 (aged 55–56)
- Position: Striker

Senior career*
Years	Team	Apps	(Gls)
- Overton Rangers
- Wishaw
- Bellhaven Oak
1924–1926	Clapton Orient	29	(3)
1926–1932	Luton Town	102	(77)
1932–1933	Charlton Athletic	51	(26)
1933–1935	Millwall	76	(24)
1936–1938	Third Lanark	34	(14)
1938–1939	Ayr United	38	(24)
1939–1940	Morton	2	(1)
- * Club domestic league appearances and goals

James Yardley (16 April 1903 – 1959) was a Scottish professional footballer, best known as a player for Luton Town.

== Playing career ==
Yardley signed for Luton Town from Clapton Orient during the 1926–27 season, but failed to score before the season ended. During 1927–28, his first full season with the club, Yardley scored 23 league goals. He continued his good form the next season, scoring 19. He continued his good form until 1932, when he was surprisingly sold to Charlton Athletic.

In 1936, now well into his 30s, he returned to Scotland where he scored 38 top flight Scottish Football League goals over three seasons with Third Lanark and Ayr United, and was selected for the Glasgow FA's annual challenge match against Sheffield in November 1936. He moved on to Morton, but the outbreak of World War II a short time later brought his career to an end.
