= Billy Arnison =

South African footballer

Personal information
- Full name: Joseph William Arnison
- Date of birth: 27 June 1924
- Place of birth: Johannesburg, South Africa
- Date of death: 1996 (aged 71–72)
- Place of death: Johannesburg, South Africa
- Position: Forward

Senior career*
Years	Team	Apps	(Gls)
1945	State Mines		
1946	Delfos		
1946–1948	Rangers	7	(1)
1948–1951	Luton Town	44	(19)
1951–1954	Berea Park		
1955	Germiston Callies		
1956	Benoni United		
1957	Brakpan United		
- * Club domestic league appearances and goals

Joseph William Arnison (27 June 1924 – 1996) was a South African professional footballer, best known as a player for Scottish club Rangers and English club Luton Town.

== Playing career ==
Arnison was signed by Glasgow club Rangers for the first post-war season, 1946–47, initially playing in the wartime Victory Cup and Southern League Cup. He scored four goals in ten games for Rangers, an impressive return, but the next season saw him isolated at Ibrox. 1948 saw him move south, when English Second Division side Luton Town offered Rangers £8,000 for his services. Arnison soon became a crowd favourite at Kenilworth Road, scoring a hat-trick in his fourth game as Luton beat Cardiff City 3–0. He finished the season as top scorer, even though he missed a large part of the season with an injury to his right knee.

After three major operations, Arnison retired from the professional game at 27 and returned to South Africa, where he became a physiotherapist.
