= Hugh Billington =

English footballer

Personal information
- Full name: Hugh John Richard Billington
- Date of birth: 24 February 1916
- Place of birth: Ampthill, England
- Date of death: 1988 (aged 71–72)
- Place of death: Luton, England
- Position: Forward

Senior career*
Years	Team	Apps	(Gls)
1937–1938	Waterlows		
1938–1948	Luton Town	87	(63)
1948–1951	Chelsea	83	(28)
1951–1952	Worcester City		
- * Club domestic league appearances and goals

Hugh John Richard Billington (24 February 1916 – 1988) was a professional footballer best known as a player for Luton Town and Chelsea.

== Playing career ==
Born in Ampthill and raised in Luton, Billington was signed by Luton Town from local side Waterlows, for whom he had scored 80 goals during 1937–38. He started the 1938–39 season in Luton's reserves, but after 14 goals in 15 games he was given his chance in the first team. On 5 November 1938, Hugh Billington made his league debut for Luton at Tranmere Rovers, and Billington scored twice as Luton won 3–2. He finished that season with 28 league goals from 27 Division Two matches, which made him the division's top scorer for that season.

The war interrupted his career. He scored regularly for Luton after the war, and was transferred to Chelsea for £8,000 in 1948. After three years with Chelsea, he spent a season with Worcester City before retiring.

He remained in Luton until his death in 1988.
