= Dunstable Road =

19th-century association football stadium in Luton, England

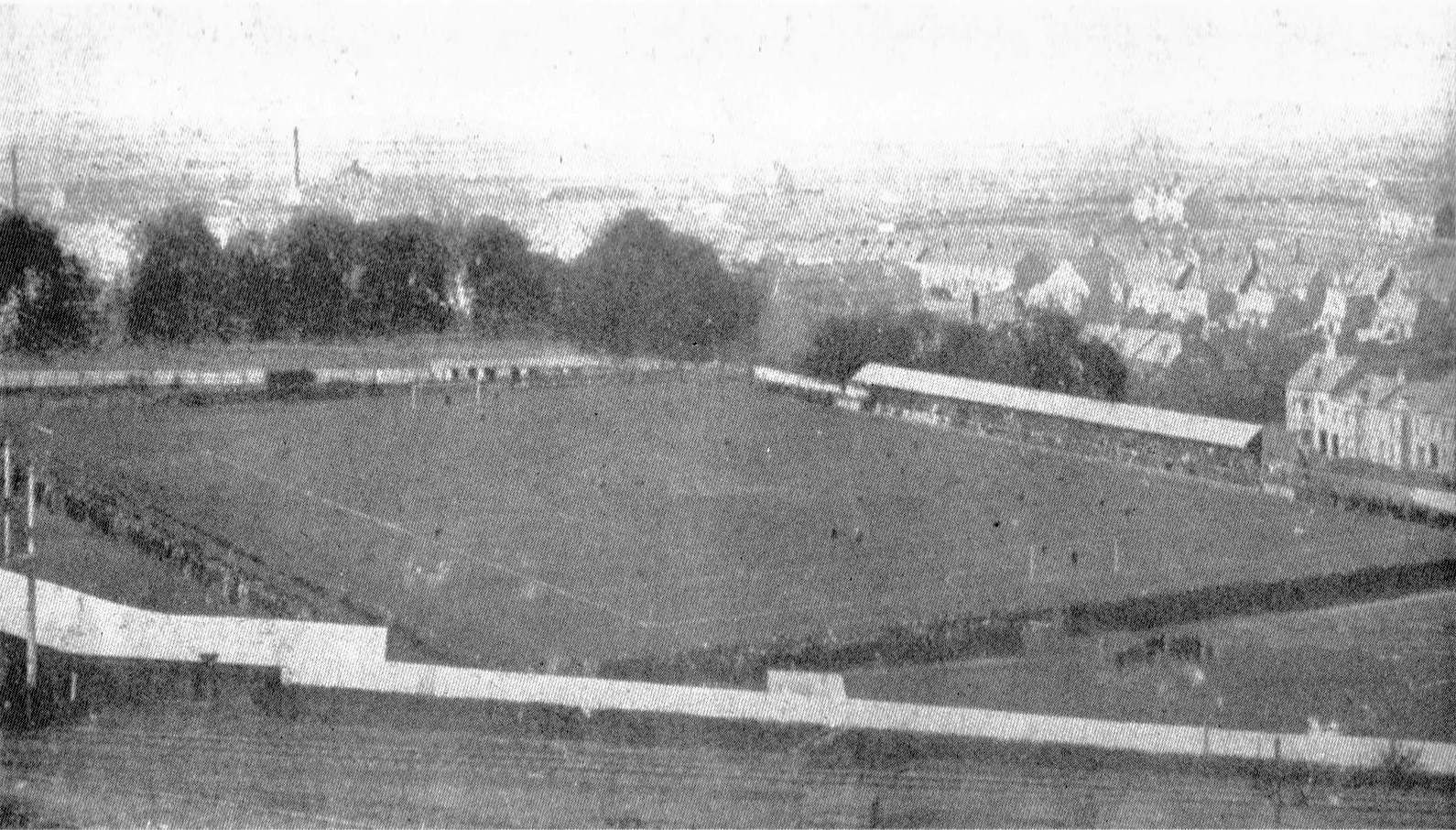
- Interactive map of Dunstable Road
- Location: Luton, England
- Coordinates: 51.8835°N 0.4273°W
- Operator: Luton Town
- Surface: Grass

Construction
- Opened: 3 April 1897
- Closed: 1905
- Cost: £800

Tenant
- Luton Town

Dunstable Road, also known as Bury Park, was a football ground in Luton, England. It was the home ground of Luton Town between 1897 and 1905.

== History ==
The ground was located between Dunstable Road and the now-closed railway line between Luton and Dunstable. Luton moved to the site in 1897 from their previous Dallow Lane ground, and Dunstable Road was officially opened on 3 April 1897 by the Duke of Bedford, who also donated £50 towards the £800 building costs. The match saw Luton beat Loughborough 3–0 in the United League. The ground initially consisted of a covered seated stand on the eastern touchline, a covered standing area on the western touchline and raised embankments around the rest of the pitch.

After finishing as runners-up in the United League in the 1896–97 season, Luton were elected to the Second Division of the Football League. The first Football League match at the ground was played on 11 September 1897, with Luton beating Gainsborough Trinity 4–0. The highest league attendance was recorded later in the season, when 5,000 saw Luton beat Grimsby Town on 27 December 1897. However, by the 1899–1900 season attendances had fallen as low as 500. Luton finished second-bottom of the Second Division and chose not to stand for re-election, instead dropping into the Southern League for the following season. The final Football League match at the ground saw Luton lose 2–1 to Small Heath on 21 April 1900 in front of 1,000 spectators.

In 1905 the site was sold for housing, and the club moved to Kenilworth Road, around 200 metres away. The site is now a mix of residential and commercial developments.
