= 1900–01 in English football =

Football in England
- Season: 1900–01

Men's football
- First Division: Liverpool
- Second Division: Grimsby Town
- Southern League: Southampton
- Northern League: Bishop Auckland
- The Combination: Wrexham
- Western League: Portsmouth
- FA Cup: Tottenham Hotspur
- Sheriff of London Charity Shield: Corinthian

The 1900–01 season was the 30th season of competitive football in England.

== Events ==
Stockport County played their first season in the football league. Blackpool also returned to the league, at the expenses of Loughborough and Luton Town.

Despite a run of four victories at the start of the season, Aston Villa finished fourth from bottom.

Liverpool won the First Division, while Preston North End and West Bromwich Albion were relegated to the Second Division. Grimsby Town won the Second Division, and were promoted to the First Division along with Small Heath.

Tottenham Hotspur became the first and only non-League club to date, to win the FA Cup. After a 2-2 draw, Tottenham won the 3-1 replay against Sheffield United of the First Division.

== Honours ==
Competition	Winner
First Division	Liverpool (1)
Second Division	Grimsby Town
FA Cup	Tottenham Hotspur (1)
Home Championship	England

Notes = Number in parentheses is the times that club has won that honour. * indicates new record for competition

== League tables ==
=== First Division ===
Pos	Team	Pld	W	D	L	GF	GA	GAv	Pts	Relegation
1	Liverpool (C)	34	19	7	8	59	35	1.686	45	
2	Sunderland	34	15	13	6	57	26	2.192	43	
3	Notts County	34	18	4	12	54	46	1.174	40	
4	Nottingham Forest	34	16	7	11	53	36	1.472	39	
5	Bury	34	16	7	11	53	37	1.432	39	
6	Newcastle United	34	14	10	10	42	37	1.135	38	
7	Everton	34	16	5	13	55	42	1.310	37	
8	The Wednesday	34	13	10	11	52	42	1.238	36	
9	Blackburn Rovers	34	12	9	13	39	47	0.830	33	
10	Bolton Wanderers	34	13	7	14	39	55	0.709	33	
11	Manchester City	34	13	6	15	48	58	0.828	32	
12	Derby County	34	12	7	15	55	42	1.310	31	
13	Wolverhampton Wanderers	34	9	13	12	39	55	0.709	31	
14	Sheffield United	34	12	7	15	35	52	0.673	31	
15	Aston Villa	34	10	10	14	45	51	0.882	30	
16	Stoke	34	11	5	18	46	57	0.807	27	
17	Preston North End (R)	34	9	7	18	49	75	0.653	25	Relegation to the Second Division
18	West Bromwich Albion (R)	34	7	8	19	35	62	0.565	22	Relegation to the Second Division

Source: World Football
Rules for classification: 1) Points; 2) Goal average; 3) Goals scored
(C) Champions; (R) Relegated

=== Second Division ===
Pos	Team	Pld	W	D	L	GF	GA	GAv	Pts	Promotion or relegation
1	Grimsby Town (C, P)	34	20	9	5	60	33	1.818	49	Promotion to the First Division
2	Small Heath (P)	34	19	10	5	57	24	2.375	48	Promotion to the First Division
3	Burnley	34	20	4	10	53	29	1.828	44	
4	New Brighton Tower	34	17	8	9	57	38	1.500	42	Dissolved
5	Glossop	34	15	8	11	51	33	1.545	38	
6	Middlesbrough	34	15	7	12	50	40	1.250	37	
7	Woolwich Arsenal	34	15	6	13	39	35	1.114	36	
8	Lincoln City	34	13	7	14	43	39	1.103	33	
9	Burslem Port Vale	34	11	11	12	45	47	0.957	33	
10	Newton Heath	34	14	4	16	42	38	1.105	32	
11	Leicester Fosse	34	11	10	13	39	37	1.054	32	
12	Blackpool	34	12	7	15	33	58	0.569	31	
13	Gainsborough Trinity	34	10	10	14	45	60	0.750	30	
14	Chesterfield Town	34	9	10	15	46	58	0.793	28	
15	Barnsley	34	11	5	18	47	60	0.783	27	
16	Walsall (R)	34	7	13	14	40	56	0.714	27	Failed re-election and demoted
17	Stockport County	34	11	3	20	38	68	0.559	25	Re-elected
18	Burton Swifts	34	8	4	22	34	66	0.515	20	Re-elected

Rules for classification: 1) Points; 2) Goal average; 3) Goals scored
(C) Champions; (P) Promoted; (R) Relegated
