= Ernie Simms =

English footballer

Personal information
- Full name: Ernest Simms
- Date of birth: 23 July 1891
- Place of birth: Easington, England
- Date of death: 11 October 1971 (aged 80)
- Place of death: Biggleswade, England
- Height: 5 ft 9 1/2 in (1.77 m)
- Position: Forward

Senior career*
Years	Team	Apps	(Gls)
	South Shields Adelaide	?	(?)
	Murton Colliery Welfare	?	(?)
1912–1913	Barnsley	0	(0)
1913–1915	Luton Town	0	(0)
1916–1922	Luton Town	160	(109)
1922–1924	South Shields	51	(17)
1924–1926	Stockport County	66	(20)
1926–1928	Scunthorpe & Lindsey United	?	(?)
1928	York City	6	(2)

International career
1921	England	1	(0)
- * Club domestic league appearances and goals

Ernest Simms (23 July 1891 – 11 October 1971) was an English footballer, who was best known as a Luton Town centre forward. He was the first forward to play for England while playing for a Third Division club.

== Career ==
=== Luton Town ===
Simms was born in Easington, County Durham, and after playing for local clubs, South Shields Adelaide and Murton Colliery Welfare, he joined Barnsley in 1912, before moving south to join Luton Town in the summer of 1913.

Simms joined the British Army at the outbreak of the First World War in August 1914, joining the Football Battalion, a unit made up of professional footballers which was attached to the Middlesex Regiment. He was discharged in 1915 and re-enlisted with the Royal Field Artillery. During the war he suffered a savage disabling leg wound which left him with serious muscle damage and a permanent limp. Simms was discharged less than a month before the armistice with Germany.

Despite the noticeable limp and ungainly running style, which always attracted the attention of passers-by whatever the weather, each and every night Simms returned to Luton's Kenilworth Road ground in a despairing effort to regain fitness and play once again. For the duration of the war the ground was closed, but Simms gained entry to the ground each night by climbing up a drain pipe with the "agility and ease of a practised cat-burglar". He then stripped down to his vest and underpants and raced up and down the terraces and completed lap after lap of the cinder track surrounding the pitch. This went on for months, until one morning the wartime caretaker arrived at the ground and noticed footprints in the deep snow. Fearing there was a burglar at large the police laid a trap and pounced on him the following evening, leaving Simms no choice but to confess everything.

The Simms case became a cause célèbre; his spirit and determination matched the national wartime mood. A special board meeting was convened whereby it was determined that his dedication and courage should be rewarded – Luton Town gave him another professional contract, and Simms dominated wartime football – he scored 40 goals during his first year back, the 1916–17 season. By the time Luton lined up for the first match of the post-war era, when Luton played in the Southern League, Ernie Simms was the club's regular centre forward. He did not do very well at first, as the standard of wartime football had not been as high – however, the club kept faith in him, and by 1920–21, Luton's first season in the League since 1900, Simms was back to form scoring 28 goals in 42 games, nearly half of Luton's 61 overall.

He received his first call into an England squad in late 1920 as a non-playing reserve, before winning his first, and only, cap a year later. 22 October 1921 saw Simms make history at Windsor Park, Belfast – becoming the first Third Division centre forward ever to play for England. The match ended in a 1–1 draw, and Luton's team of the time was so strong that the Ireland team included Luton's other two forwards, Louis Bookman and Allan Mathieson.

=== Later career ===
Simms moved up to the Second Division when he was sold to his home-town club, South Shields, in the spring of 1922, where he remained for two years before joining Stockport County, also in the Second Division, in January 1924. After two and a half years with the club, he moved to Scunthorpe & Lindsey United for eighteen months, before finishing his career with York City in 1928, playing in the Midland League.

Although he never played for England again, he did captain an FA XI on a tour of Australia in 1925.

After retiring from football, he returned to live in Luton, working at Vauxhall Motors and assisting their works side.

== Bibliography ==
- Collings, Timothy (1985). The Luton Town Story 1885–1985. Luton Town F.C. pp. 25–26, 205–206. ISBN 0-9510679-0-7.
