= Andy Rennie (Scottish footballer) =

Scottish footballer

Personal information
- Full name: Andrew Rennie
- Date of birth: 3 November 1901
- Place of birth: Baillieston, Scotland
- Date of death: 5 September 1938 (aged 36)
- Place of death: Luton, England
- Position: Centre-forward

Youth career
- Paisley Waverley

Senior career*
Years	Team	Apps	(Gls)
–1925	Kilwinning Rangers		
1925–1934	Luton Town	307	(147)
1934–1935	Newport County	3	(0)
- * Club domestic league appearances and goals

Andrew Rennie (3 November 1901 – 5 September 1938) was a Scottish footballer, best known as a player for Luton Town. He is Luton Town's second top goalscorer of all time, with 162 goals between 1925 and 1934, 147 of which came in the league.

== Playing career ==
Rennie was a prolific goalscorer in his junior days in Scotland, but on joining Kilwinning Rangers he was moved to centre-back.

Rennie left Kilwinning for English Third Division South team Luton Town in 1925, still as a defender. He remained playing in that position for two years at Luton, until Luton manager John McCartney moved him back to the forward line. It was a shrewd decision by McCartney: Rennie scored in his first game up front, and finished the year as the club's leading scorer, with 24 goals in as many games. Rennie did even better during the 1928–29 season, scoring 43 goals in only 41 matches to be the highest goalscorer for the Third Division South.

Nicknamed "Ratty" due to his short temper, Rennie went on to become Luton's second highest goalscorer of all time – at the time, he was the top goalscorer. His records were broken by Gordon Turner three decades later.

== Post-retirement ==
Rennie died on 5 September 1938 in Luton Hospital following a hernia operation, only four years after leaving Luton and three years after retiring from professional football. He was laid to rest on 8 September 1938 at Luton municipal cemetery, Rothesay Road; he is buried in plot 2040B and has a headstone, "Andrew (Andy) Rennie, a loving husband and father".
