= Gordon Turner =

English footballer (1930–1976)

Personal information
- Full name: Gordon Reginald Turner
- Date of birth: 7 June 1930
- Place of birth: Hull, East Riding of Yorkshire, England
- Date of death: 23 December 1976
- Position: Forward

Senior career*
Years	Team	Apps	(Gls)
1949–1964	Luton Town	406	(243)
1964–1965	Wisbech Town		
1965–1966	Kettering Town		
1966–1967	Bletchley Town		
- * Club domestic league appearances and goals

Gordon Reginald Turner (7 June 1930 – 23 December 1976) was an English footballer, who was best known as a Luton Town centre forward. He is Luton Town's all-time top goalscorer, with 243 in the League and 276 overall.

== Football career ==
=== Luton Town ===
Born in Hull, but raised in Doncaster from the age of four, the son of a Hull City professional footballer, Turner began his own footballing career as a right sided midfielder. During his national service in the Royal Navy, two Chief Petty Officers, both Lutonians, saw his raw talent and tipped off Dally Duncan, the manager of Luton Town. Duncan happened to know the teenage Turner's father, having played alongside him for Hull—whether or not this influenced his judgement, Turner was signed on as an apprentice in 1949.

He made his debut on 9 December 1950, in a 4–1 defeat at Coventry City, playing in midfield. However, the following season, he was given the opportunity to play up front and soon began scoring many goals, including a hat-trick in his fourth game.

Over the next few seasons Turner developed into Luton's star player—he scored 32 goals during the 1954–55 season to secure top flight football at Kenilworth Road for the first time, and continued to help Luton hold their own in the First Division.

Turner was dropped from the team for the FA Cup for the 1958–59 season due to injury—despite Turner's absence, Luton marched to the final at Wembley to face Nottingham Forest in their first Cup final. Despite Turner's return to fitness, Luton named an unchanged side, meaning Turner was still not picked. Luton lost 2–1.

Turner's last Football League match came on 25 April 1964, as Luton beat Watford 2–1 at Kenilworth Road. By his final game, he had scored 243 league goals for the club, and 276 in all competitions. Both of these figures stand as club records in 2009.

=== Later career ===
After he had retired from the League, Turner joined his former Luton team-mate Jesse Pye at Wisbech Town, where Pye was player-manager. He then spent a season at Kettering Town, scoring 37 goals.

Turner contracted motor neurone disease when he was 41, and died two days before Christmas in 1976 at the age of 46.
