= Luton Town F.C. =

Association football club in Luton, England

Luton Town
- Full name: Luton Town Football Club
- Nickname: The Hatters
- Short name: Town
- Founded: 11 April 1885; 141 years ago
- Ground: Kenilworth Road
- Capacity: 12,056
- Owner: Luton Town Football Club 2020 Ltd
- Chairman: David Wilkinson
- Manager: Jack Wilshere
- League: EFL League One
- 2025–26: EFL League One, 7th of 24
- Website: lutontown.co.uk
Home colours	Away colours	Third colours

Luton Town Football Club is a professional football club from Luton, Bedfordshire, England. Founded in 1885, the club currently competes in EFL League One, the third tier of the English football league system. Nicknamed the "Hatters", Luton have played their home games at Kenilworth Road since 1905.

Luton Town joined the Football League before the 1897–98 season but left soon after in 1900 due to financial issues. The club did not rejoin the League until 1920. Luton competed in the First Division for the first time during the 1955–56 season and contested a major final for the first time against Nottingham Forest in the 1959 FA Cup final. The club was then relegated from the First Division at the end of the 1959–60 season, and further relegated twice more in five years, playing in the Fourth Division from the 1965–66 season, before returning to the First Division for the 1974–75 season for a single season.

At the end of the 1981–82 season, the club won the Second Division and gained promotion to the First Division. Several years later, Luton defeated Arsenal 3–2 in the 1988 Football League Cup final and remained in the First Division until relegation at the end of the 1991–92 season.

Between 2007 and 2009, financial difficulties caused the club to fall from the second tier of English football to the fifth in successive seasons. The last of these relegations, in the 2008–09 season, followed a 30-point deduction for financial irregularities. Luton spent five seasons in non-League football before winning the Conference Premier in the 2013–14 season, securing promotion back into the Football League. Luton was promoted from League Two and League One in successive seasons in 2017–18 and 2018–19 before being promoted to the Premier League at the conclusion of the 2023 Championship playoffs. After spending a season in the Premier League, Luton saw two back-to-back relegations, seeing them play in League One for the 2025–26 season.

== History ==
=== Formation and election to the Southern League (1885–1890) ===
Luton Town Football Club was founded on 11 April 1885. Prior to its formation, there were many other football clubs in the town, the most prominent of which were Luton Wanderers and Luton Excelsior. A Wanderers player, George Deacon, came up with the idea of a 'Town' club which would include all the best players in Luton. Wanderers secretary Herbert Spratley seized upon Deacon's idea and arranged a secret meeting on 13 January 1885 at St Matthew's School in High Town, near the railway station. The Wanderers committee resolved to rename the club Luton Town—which was not well received by the wider community. The local newspapers referred to the club as 'Luton Town (late Wanderers)'. When George Deacon and John Charles Lomax then arranged a public meeting with the purpose of forming a 'Luton Town Football Club', Spratley protested, saying there was already a Luton Town club; and the atmosphere was tense when the meeting convened in the town hall on 11 April 1885. The meeting, attended by most football lovers in the town, heard about Spratley's secret January meeting and voted down his objections. The motion to form a 'Luton Town Football Club', put forward by GH Small and seconded by EH Lomax, was carried. A club committee was elected by ballot and the team colours were agreed to be pink and dark blue shirts and caps.

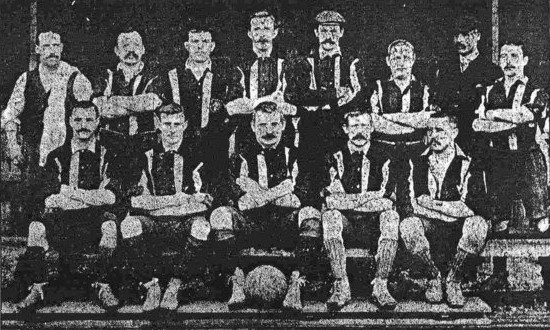
The Luton Town squad of 1897–98, which won the United League title

Initially based at Excelsior's ground, Dallow Lane, Luton Town began making payments to certain individual players in 1890. The following year, Luton became the first club in southern England to be fully professional. The club was a founder member of the Southern Football League in the 1894–95 season and finished as runners-up in its first two seasons. It then left to help form the United League and came second in that league's inaugural season before joining the Football League (then based mostly in northern and central England)^{[A]} for the 1897–98 season, concurrently moving to a new ground, Dunstable Road. The club continued to enter a team to the United League for two more seasons, winning the title in the 1897–98 season. Poor attendance, high wages, in addition to the high travel and accommodation costs that resulted from Luton's distance from the northern heartlands of the Football League crippled the club financially; it became too expensive to compete in that league. A return to the Southern League was therefore arranged for the 1900–01 season.

=== Early 20th century (1900–1950) ===
Luton moved into their current ground, Kenilworth Road, in 1905 after having spent eight years at Dunstable Road. Captain and left winger Bob Hawkes became Luton's first international player when he was picked to play for England against Ireland on 16 February 1907. A poor 1911–12 season saw Luton relegated to the Southern League's Second Division; the club won promotion back two years later. After the First World War broke out, Luton took part in The London Combination during the 1915–16 season, and afterwards filled each season with friendly matches. A key player of the period was Ernie Simms, a forward. Simms was invalided back to England after being wounded on the Italian front, but recovered enough to regain his place in the Luton team and scored 40 goals during the 1916–17 season.

1936: Joe Payne (white shirt, left) scores one of his record-breaking 10 goals in one match

The Luton side first played in the white and black colours which it retained for much of its history during the 1920–21 season, when the club rejoined the Football League; the players had previously worn an assortment of colour combinations, most permanently sky blue shirts with white shorts and navy socks. Such was the quality of Luton's team at this time that despite playing in the third tier, a fixture between Ireland and England at Windsor Park on 22 October 1921 saw three Luton players on the pitch—Louis Bookman and Allan Mathieson for Ireland, and the club's top goalscorer, Simms, for England. However, after Luton finished fourth in the division, the squad was broken up as Simms, Bookman and Mathieson joined South Shields, Port Vale and Exeter City respectively. Luton stayed in the Third Division South until 1936–37, when the team finished first and won promotion to the Second Division. During the promotion season, striker Joe Payne scored 55 goals in 39 games; during the previous season he had scored 10 in one match against Bristol Rovers, which remains a Football League record today. Towards the end on the 1936-37 season Eddie Parris became the first Black player to represent Luton when he made his debut on 13 March 1937 in a home game against Northampton Town.

=== Success under Duncan and relegation (1950–1965) ===
During the early 1950s, one of Luton's greatest sides emerged under manager, Dally Duncan. The team included Gordon Turner, who went on to become Luton's all-time top goalscorer, Bob Morton, who holds the record for the most club appearances and Syd Owen, an England international. During this period, Luton sides also featured two England international goalkeepers, Ron Baynham and Bernard Streten, as well as Irish internationals Seamus Dunne, Tom Aherne and George Cummins. This team reached the First Division for the first time at the end of the 1955–56 season, having finished in second place behind Birmingham City on goal difference. A few years of success followed, including an FA Cup Final appearance against Nottingham Forest in the 1958–59 season where Owen was voted FWA Footballer of the Year. However, the club was relegated the following season and, by the 1964–65 season, was playing in the Fourth Division.

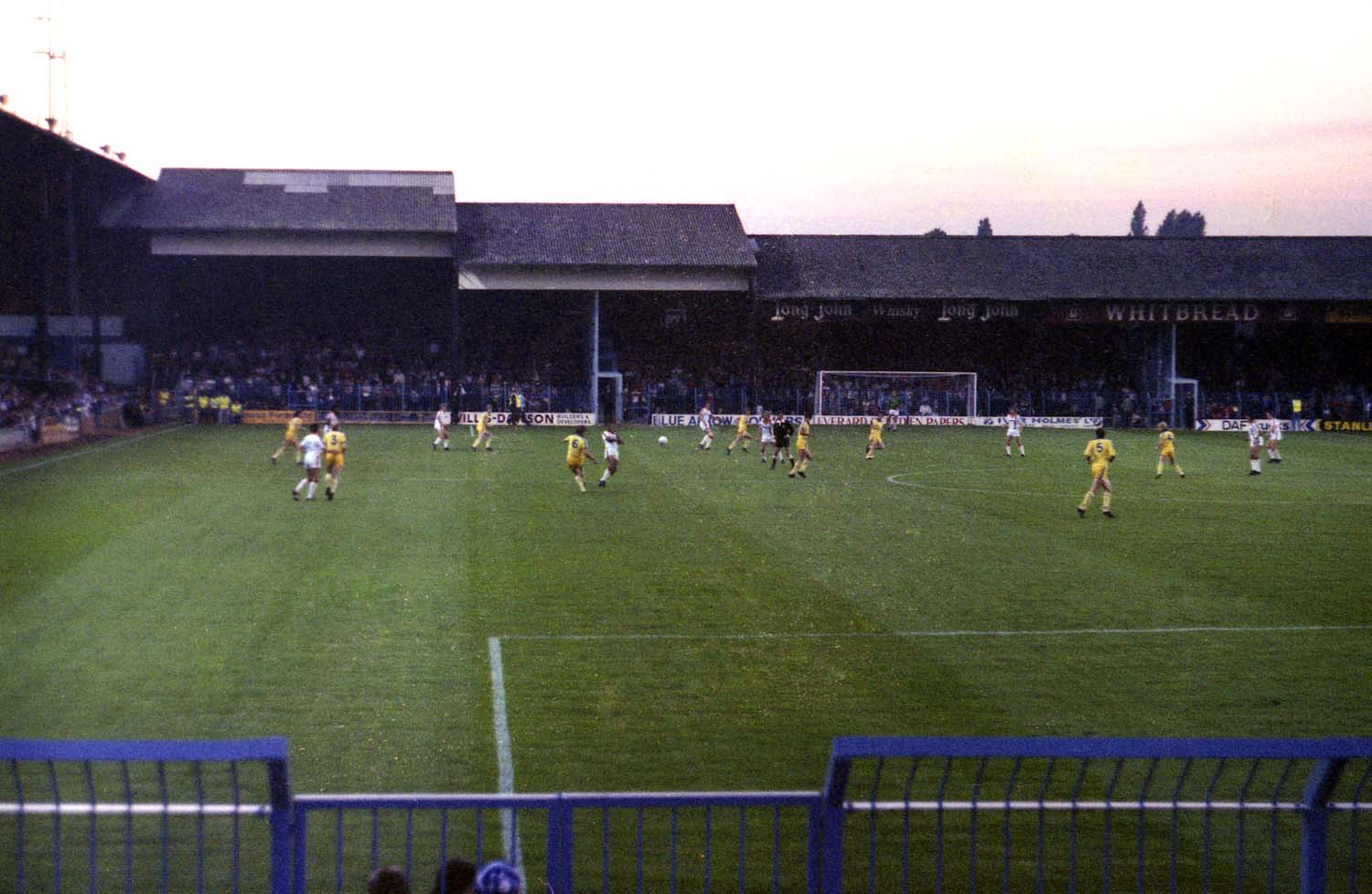
A home match at Kenilworth Road in 1980

=== Back to the first tier and late century success (1965–1992) ===
In yo-yo club fashion, Luton were to return. A team including Bruce Rioch, John Moore and Graham French won the Fourth Division championship in the 1967–68 season under the leadership of former player Allan Brown; two years later Malcolm Macdonald's goals helped them to another promotion, while comedian Eric Morecambe became a director of the club. Luton Town won promotion back to the First Division at the end of the 1973–74 season, but were relegated the following season by a solitary point. Former Luton player David Pleat was made manager in 1978, and by the 1982–83 season the team was back in the top flight. The team which Pleat assembled at Kenilworth Road was notable at the time for the number of Black players it included; during an era when many English squads were almost entirely white, Luton often fielded a mostly black team. Talented players such as Ricky Hill, Brian Stein and Emeka Nwajiobi made key contributions to the club's success during this period, causing it to accrue "a richer history of black stars than any in the country", in the words of journalist Gavin Willacy.

On the last day of the 1982–83 season, the club's first back in the top tier, it narrowly escaped relegation: playing Manchester City at Maine Road, Luton needed to win to stay up, while City could escape with a draw. A late winner by Yugoslavian substitute Raddy Antić saved the team and prompted Pleat to dance across the pitch performing a "jig of joy", an image that has become iconic. The club achieved its highest ever league position, seventh, under John Moore in the 1986–87 season, and, managed by Ray Harford, won the Football League Cup a year later with a 3–2 win over Arsenal. With ten minutes left on the clock and Arsenal 2–1 ahead, a penalty save from stand-in goalkeeper Andy Dibble sparked a late Luton rally: Danny Wilson equalised, before Brian Stein scored the winner with the last kick of the match. The club reached the League Cup Final once more in the 1988–89 season, but lost 3–1 to Nottingham Forest.

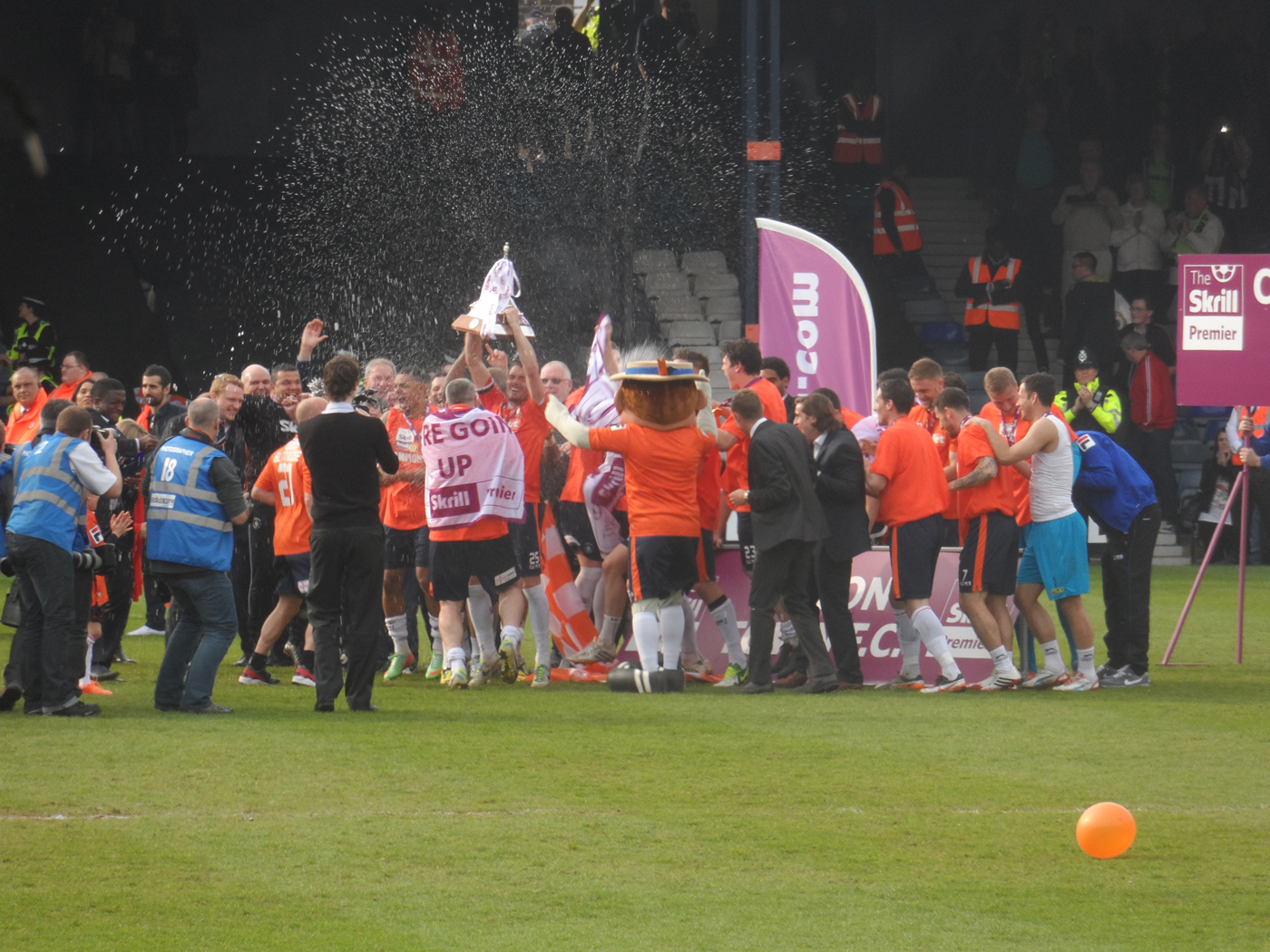
Luton Town players and staff celebrate winning the Conference Premier title in 2014

=== Resurgence and fall to non-League (1992–2009) ===
The club was relegated from the top division at the end of the 1991–92 season, and sank to the third tier four years later. Luton stayed in the third-tier Second Division until relegation at the end of the 2000–01 season. Under the management of Joe Kinnear, who had arrived halfway through the previous season, the team won promotion from the fourth tier at the first attempt. "Controversial" owner John Gurney unsettled the club in 2003, terminating Kinnear's contract on his arrival in May; Gurney replaced Kinnear with Mike Newell before leaving Luton as the club entered administration. Newell's team finished as champions of the rebranded third-tier Football League One in 2004–05.

While Newell's place was taken first by Kevin Blackwell and later former player Mick Harford, the team was then relegated twice in a row, starting in 2006–07, and spent the latter part of the 2007–08 season in administration, thus incurring a ten-point deduction from that season's total. The club then had a total of 30 points docked from its 2008–09 record by the Football Association and the Football League for financial irregularities dating back several years. These deductions proved to be too large an obstacle to overcome, but Luton came from behind in the final of the Football League Trophy to win the competition for the first time.

=== Non-league to Premier League (2009–2024) ===
Relegation meant that the 2009–10 season saw Luton playing in the Conference Premier, a competition in which the club had never before participated. The club unsuccessfully contested the promotion play-offs three times in four seasons during their time as a non-League club, employing five different managers. In the 2012–13 FA Cup fourth round, Luton won their away tie against Premier League club Norwich City 1–0 and, in doing so, became the first non-League team to beat a side from England's top division since 1989.

In the 2013–14 season, under the management of John Still, Luton won the Conference Premier title with three games to spare, and thereby secured a return to the Football League for the 2014–15 season. After reaching the League Two play-offs during the 2016–17 season, when they were beaten 6–5 on aggregate by Blackpool in the semi-final, Luton were promoted back to League One the following season as runners-up. Luton achieved a second successive promotion at the end of the 2018–19 season, after they won the League One title, marking the club's return to the Championship after a 12-year absence. Luton reached the Championship play-offs in 2021–22, where they were beaten 2–1 on aggregate by Huddersfield Town in the semi-final.

At the end of the 2022–23 season, Luton Town secured a consecutive place in the Championship play-offs having finished in 3rd place. Luton Town beat Sunderland 3–2 on aggregate in the play-off semi-finals to reach the play-off final against Coventry City. They went on to beat Coventry City 6–5 on penalties after a tense 1–1 draw to secure promotion to the Premier League for the first time. After collecting one point in their first five matches of the season, Luton won their first Premier League game on 30 September 2023, beating Everton 2–1 away at Goodison Park. After a stable first half of the season, the club's form significantly regressed after January, winning one in seventeen matches before being relegated in May 2024.

=== Back-to-back relegation to League One (2024–present) ===
On 3 May 2025, a second successive relegation put Luton back in League One after losing 5–3 on the final day to West Bromwich Albion. Despite compiling 49 points and equaling Hull City's total, their inferior goal difference resulted in them finishing 22nd.

Luton parted ways with head coach Matt Bloomfield on 6 October 2025. Bloomfield was sacked by Luton after a bad run of games, leaving the club in 11th place in the league. Jack Wilshere was appointed manager on 13 October 2025. On 12 April 2026, Luton achieved a 3–1 victory over Stockport County in the 2026 EFL Trophy final, winning the competition for the first time since 2009. Despite a run of 12 games unbeaten towards the end of the season, Luton failed to make the play-off spots due to a late goal against Wigan Athletic by Stevenage. Luton finished the 2025–26 season in 7th place.

== Club identity ==
=== Badge ===
Luton Town badge, 1973–87

Luton Town have traditionally used the town's crest as its own in a manner similar to many other teams. The club's first badge was a white eight-pointed star, which was emblazoned across the team's shirts (then a deep cochineal red) in 1892. Four years later, a crest comprising the club's initials intertwined was briefly adopted. The shirts were thereafter plain until 1933, when Luton first adopted a badge depicting a straw boater. The club's initials were again added in 1935, with this basic design remaining until 1947. The club then played without a badge until 1970, when the club began to wear the town crest regularly, having first done so in the 1959 FA Cup Final.

In 1973, concurrently with the club's switch from a white to an orange kit, a new badge was introduced featuring the club's new colours. The new emblem depicted a stylised orange football, bearing the letters "Lt", surrounded by the club's name in navy blue text. In 1987, the club switched back to a derivative of the town crest, with the shield portion of the heraldic crest becoming the team's badge; the only similarity with the previous design was the inclusion of the club name around the shield in navy blue. The "rainbow" badge, introduced in 1994, featured the town crest below an orange and blue bow which curved around to meet two footballs, positioned on either side of the shield, with the club name underneath. This badge was used until 2005, when a replacement very similar to the 1987 version was adopted, featuring black text rather than blue and a straw boater in place of the outstretched arm depicted in the older design. The club's founding year, 1885, was added in 2008. The badge was altered to its current form during the 2009–10 pre-season, with the red of the town crest being replaced with orange to better reflect the club colours, as well as the font having been modernised.

=== Kit ===
Luton first wore white and black between 1920 and 1973.

The club is associated with two very different colour schemes—white and black (first permanently adopted in 1920), and orange, navy and white (first used in 1973). Luton mainly wore a combination of light blue and white before 1920, when white shirts and black shorts were first adopted. These colours were retained for over half a century, with the colour of the socks varying between white and black, until Luton changed to orange, navy and white at the start of the 1973–74 season. Luton began playing in white shirts, shorts and socks in 1979, with the orange and navy motif reduced to trim; navy shorts were adopted in 1984. This palette was retained until the 1999–2000 season, when the team played in orange shirts and blue shorts. From 2000 to 2008, Luton returned to white shirts and black shorts; orange was included as trim until 2007. The white, navy and orange palette favoured in the 1980s was brought back in 2008, following the results of a club poll, but a year later the colours were changed yet again, this time to a predominantly orange strip with white shorts. Navy shorts were readopted in 2011. Luton wore orange shirts, navy shorts and white socks during the 2015–16 season.

=== Shirt sponsors and manufacturers ===
Year	Manufacturer	Primary Shirt Sponsor		
1981–1982	Adidas	Tricentrol		
1982–1989	Adidas	Bedford Trucks		
1989–1990	Umbro	Bedford Trucks		
1999–1991	Umbro	Vauxhall		
1991–1992	Umbro	Universal Salvage Auctions		
1992–1994	DMF	Universal Salvage Auctions		
1994–1995	In-house	Universal Salvage Auctions		
1995–1999	Pony	Universal Salvage Auctions		
1999–2001	Olympic	SKF		
2001–2003	Xara	SKF		
2003–2005	Xara	Travel Extras		
2005–2007	Diadora	Electrolux		
2007–2008	Puma	Electrolux		
2008–2009	Carbrini			
2009–2013	Carbrini	EasyJet		
2013–2015	Fila	EasyJet		
2015–2015	Fila	Barnfield College		
2016–2018	Puma	SsangYong		
2018–2019	Puma	Indigo Residential (home)	Star Platforms (away)	Northern Gas & Power (third)
2019–2020	Puma	Indigo Residential (home)	Star Platforms (away)	Ryebridge Construction (third)
2020–2022	Umbro	JB Developments (home)	Star Platforms (away)	Ryebridge Construction (third)
2022–2023	Umbro	Utilita (home)	Star Platforms (away)	Ryebridge Construction (third)
2023–2025	Umbro	Utilita		
2025–present	Reflo	Capital Sky		

=== Pop culture ===
The club released the song "Hatters, Hatters", a collaboration between the Luton team and the Bedfordshire-based musical comedy group The Barron Knights, in 1974. Eight years later another song featuring vocals by the Luton players, "We're Luton Town", was released to celebrate the club's promotion to the First Division.

== Stadium ==
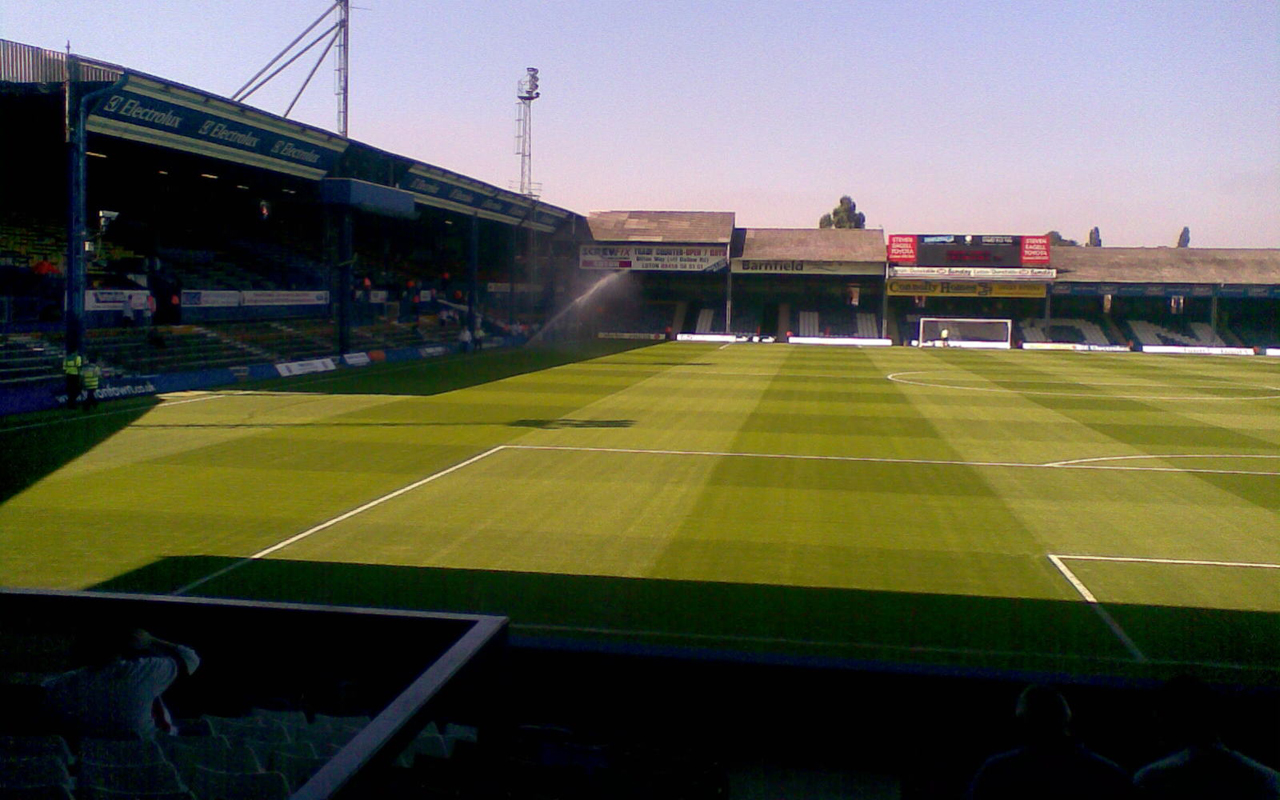
The view from the Kenilworth End in 2007. To the left is the Main Stand, and to the right is the Oak Road End.

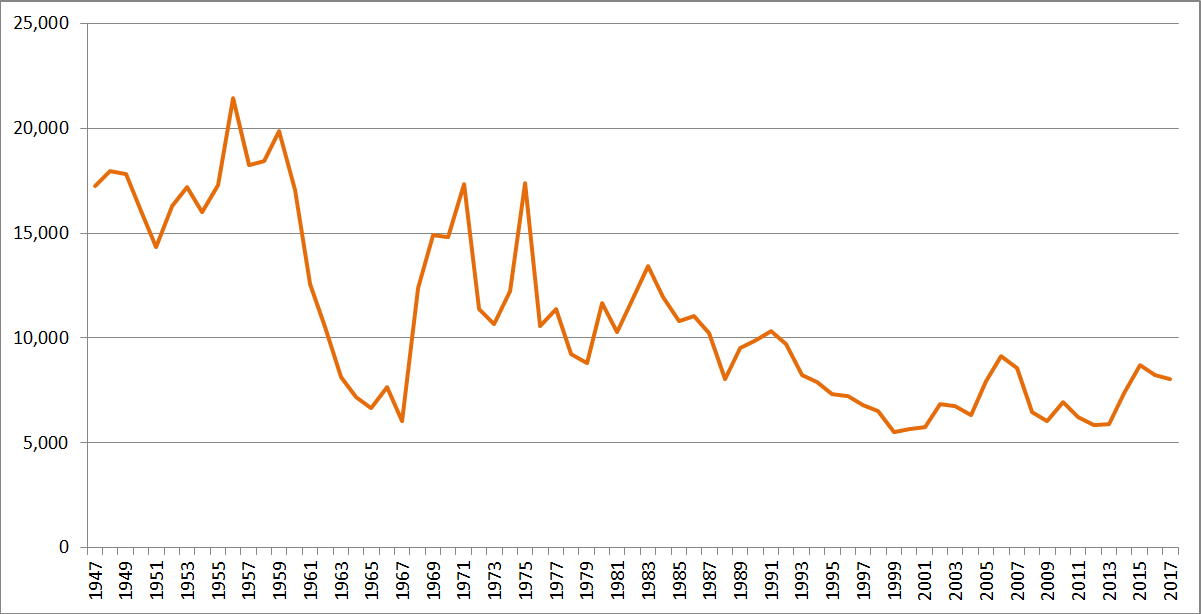
Luton Town's average home league attendances at Kenilworth Road from 1946–47 to 2016–17. Attendances rose with Luton's promotion in 1955 before plummeting during the early 1960s as the club suffered three relegations. Spectators returned with the promotions of the late 1960s and mid 1970s, before seeing a decline with the introduction of an all-seater stadium in 1986.

Luton Town's first ground was at Dallow Lane, the former ground of Luton Excelsior. The ground was next to the old Hertford, Luton and Dunstable Railway line, and players regularly claimed to have trouble seeing the ball due to smoke from the trains. A damaging financial loss during 1896–97 forced Luton to sell the stadium to stay afloat and, as a result, the club moved across the tracks to a stadium between the railway and Dunstable Road.

The Dunstable Road ground was opened by Herbrand Russell, 11th Duke of Bedford, who also donated £50 towards the £800 building costs. When the site was sold for housing in 1905, the club was forced to move again at short notice to its present Kenilworth Road site in time for the start of the 1905–06 season.

Kenilworth Road has an all-seater capacity of 12,056 and is situated in the Bury Park area of Luton. It was named after the road that runs along one end of it, although the official address of the club is 1 Maple Road. Opposite the eponymous Kenilworth Stand is the Oak Road End, which has evolved from a stand first used exclusively by Luton supporters, then later by away supporters, and now used by both except in times of high ticket demand from away clubs. The Main Stand is flanked by the David Preece Stand, and opposite them stands a row of executive boxes. These boxes replaced the Bobbers Stand in 1986, as the club sought to maximise income.

The original Main Stand burnt down in 1921, and was replaced by the current stand before the 1922–23 season. The ground underwent extensive redevelopment during the 1930s, with the capacity by the start of the Second World War being 30,000. Floodlights were installed before the 1953–54 season, but it was 20 years before any further modernisation was carried out. In 1973, the Bobbers Stand became all-seated, and in 1985 the grass pitch was replaced with an artificial playing surface; it quickly became unpopular and was derided as "the plastic pitch".

A serious incident involving hooliganism before, during and after a match against Millwall in 1985 led to the club's then chairman, Conservative Member of Parliament, David Evans, introducing a scheme effective from the start of 1986–87 supposedly banning all visiting supporters from the ground, and requiring home fans to carry membership cards when attending matches. Conversion to an all-seater ground also began in 1986. Away fans returned for 1990–91, and grass a year later. The David Preece Stand was erected in 1991, and the conversion of the Kenilworth Stand to an all-seater was completed in 2005.

=== New stadium ===
The club first expressed an interest in building a new stadium away from Kenilworth Road in 1955, the year it won promotion to the First Division for the first time. Even then the ground was small compared to those of most First and Second Division clubs, and its location made significant redevelopment difficult. The team has since made several attempts to relocate. Leaving Luton for the nearby new town of Milton Keynes was unsuccessfully proposed several times, most notably in the 1980s. The club sold Kenilworth Road to Luton Council in 1989, and has since leased it. A planning application for a new 20,000-seater indoor stadium, the "Kohlerdome" proposed by chairman David Kohler in 1995, was turned down by the Secretary of State in 1998, and Kohler left soon after.

In 2007, the club's then-owners proposed a controversial plan to relocate to a site near Junction 12 of the M1 motorway, near Harlington and Toddington. A planning application was made on the club's behalf by former chairman Cliff Bassett, but the application was withdrawn almost immediately following the club's takeover in 2008. In 2009, the club began an independent feasibility study to determine a viable location to move to. The club did not rule out redeveloping Kenilworth Road and, in October 2012, entered talks to buy the stadium back from Luton Borough Council. By 2015, these plans had been dropped in favour of a move to a new location, with managing director Gary Sweet confirming that the club was in a position to "buy land, secure the best possible professional advice ... and to see the [planning] application process through to the receipt of consent."

In April 2016, the club announced its intention to build and move into a 17,500-capacity stadium on the Power Court site in central Luton. Outline planning permission for this ground, with potential to expand to 23,000 seats, was granted by Luton Borough Council on 16 January 2019. In March 2021, the club announced that it intended to make a number of changes to the initial scheme to reflect changes caused by the COVID-19 pandemic, but that the capacity of the new stadium was still to be 23,000 and had a target opening date of 2024. This plan was revised in 2023, to delivering the first phase, a 19,500-seat stadium, by 2026, followed by the second, a further 4,000 safe standing seats, at a later date. In September 2024, the club submitted revised plans to the Luton Borough Council for a 25,000 stadium with a planned opening date of 2027. The council approved the plans in January 2025. In April 2025, Turkish contractor Limak International was appointed to build the new stadium, with construction starting in summer 2025 and the stadium, currently called Power Court Stadium, is now set to hold its first competitive game at the start of the 2028–29 season.

== Supporters and rivalries ==
=== Supporters ===
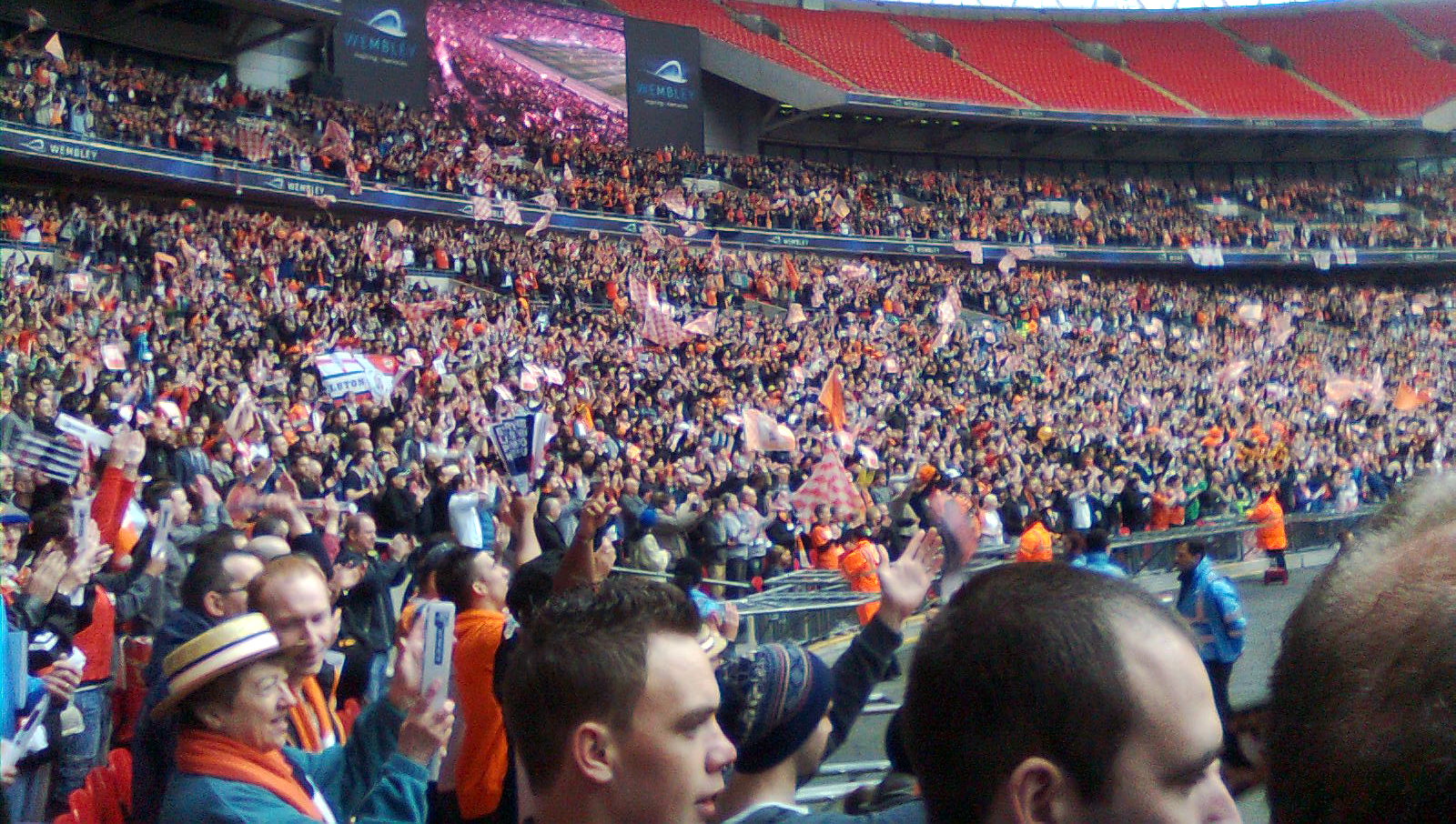
Luton supporters at Wembley Stadium, May 2012

The club's nickname, "the Hatters", reflects Luton's historical connection with the hat making trade, which has been prominent there since the 17th century. Supporters of the club are also called Hatters.

During the 2014–15 season, Luton Town had an average home league attendance of 8,702—the second highest in League Two behind only Portsmouth.^{[B]} In the 2013–14 season, when the club were in the Conference Premier, the club had significantly higher support than the other clubs in its league, with an average home attendance of 7,387; more than twice compared to the second highest of 3,568.^{[C]} Average attendances at Kenilworth Road fell with the installation of seats and the club's reduction in stature, dropping from 13,452 in 1982–83 to their 2014–15 level—a slump of 35% over 32 years. The Luton Town Supporters' Trust owns shares in the club and elects a representative to the club's board. The club is associated with another supporters' group, the breakaway Loyal Luton Supporters Club. The trust has, since March 2014, held the legal right to veto any changes to the club's identity, including name, nickname, colours, club crest and mascot.

The club produces an official match programme for home matches, entitled Our Town. A character known as Happy Harry, a smiling man wearing a straw boater, serves as the team's mascot and appears on the Kenilworth Road pitch before matches. In December 2014, after the seafront statue of Eric Morecambe in his birthplace Morecambe was restored, Luton and Morecambe F.C. jointly announced that the winners of future Luton–Morecambe fixtures would be awarded the "Eric Morecambe Trophy".

=== Rivalries ===
Luton Town supporters maintain a bitter rivalry with Hertfordshire-based Watford. Watford were the higher ranked team at the end of every season from 1997 until 2022. However, overall Luton still hold the superior record in the fixture between the two clubs; out of 120 competitive matches there have been 55 Luton victories and 38 for Watford, with 29 draws. The 2003 Football Fans Census showed that there was also animosity between Luton Town fans and those of west London club Queens Park Rangers.

== Records and statistics ==
Luton Town's yearly performance from the club's election into the Football League to the present.

The record for the most appearances for Luton is held by Bob Morton, who turned out for Luton 562 times in all competitions. Morton also holds the record for the most Football League appearances for the club, with 495. Fred Hawkes holds the record for the most league appearances for Luton, having played in 509 league matches. Six players, Gordon Turner, Andy Rennie, Brian Stein, Ernie Simms, Herbert Moody and Steve Howard, have scored more than 100 goals for Luton.

The first player to be capped while playing for Luton was left winger Robert Hawkes, who took to the field for England against Ireland at Goodison Park on 16 February 1907. The most capped player is Mal Donaghy, who earned 58 Northern Ireland caps while at the club. The first player to score in an international match was Joe Payne, who scored twice in his only game for England against Finland on 20 May 1937. Payne also holds the Football League record for the most goals in a game—he hit 10 past Bristol Rovers on 13 April 1936.

The club's largest wins have been a 15–0 victory over Great Yarmouth Town on 21 November 1914 in the FA Cup and a 12–0 win over Bristol Rovers in the Third Division South on 13 April 1936. Luton's heaviest loss was a 9–0 defeat against Small Heath in the Second Division on 12 November 1898.

Luton's highest home attendances are 30,069 against Blackpool in the FA Cup on 4 March 1959 and 27,911 against Wolverhampton Wanderers in the First Division on 5 November 1955.

The highest transfer fee received for a Luton Town player is the fee Leicester City paid for Luton-born full-back James Justin on 28 June 2019. The most expensive player Luton Town have ever bought is believed to be Mark McGuinness, who signed on 20 August 2024 for a reported fee of £6 million, although the figure remains undisclosed.

The youngest player to make a first-team appearance for Luton Town is Connor Tomlinson at 15 years and 199 days old in the EFL Trophy, replacing Zane Banton as a 92nd-minute substitute in a 2–1 win over Gillingham on 30 August 2016, after the club were given permission for him to play from his headteacher.

The youngest player to score a senior goal for Luton Town is Finley Evans, who scored in an EFL Trophy match against Brighton & Hove Albion U21s on 28 October 2025 aged 16 years and 271 days old.

== Players ==
=== First team ===
==== Current squad ====
As of 25 September 2026

Note: Flags indicate national team as defined under FIFA eligibility rules; some limited exceptions apply. Players may hold more than one non-FIFA nationality.

No.	Pos.	Nation	Player
1	GK	ENG	James Shea
2	DF	ENG	Hakeem Odoffin
3	DF	SCO	Kal Naismith (captain)
4	MF	NOR	Sverre Sandal
5	DF	DEN	Mads Andersen
6	DF	SCO	George Johnston
7	MF	ENG	Jake Richards
8	MF	ENG	Liam Walsh
9	FW	NIR	Callum Marshall
10	MF	NIR	Jamie Donley (on loan from Tottenham Hotspur)
11	MF	SCO	Emilio Lawrence (on loan from Manchester City)
12	DF	ENG	Joe Johnson
14	FW	ENG	Shayden Morris
15	DF	ENG	Teden Mengi
16	MF	ENG	Dan Gore (on loan from Manchester United)

No.	Pos.	Nation	Player
17	FW	ENG	Tudor Mendel (on loan from Ipswich Town)
18	MF	ENG	Jordan Clark
19	MF	ENG	Jayden Luker
21	FW	BER	Nahki Wells
22	DF	ENG	Harry Fox
24	GK	IRL	Josh Keeley
25	DF	GUY	Isaiah Jones
26	MF	GRN	Shandon Baptiste
30	FW	ENG	Gideon Kodua
31	DF	ENG	Benny Benagr
33	DF	SCO	Harrison Ashby (on loan from Newcastle United)
42	DF	ESP	Christian Chigozie
44	FW	JAM	Devante Cole
45	MF	JAM	Kasey Palmer
—	DF	ENG	Reuell Walters

==== Out on loan ====
No.	Pos.	Nation	Player
—	MF	ENG	Ethon Archer (on loan at Bromley)
—	FW	ENG	Joe Gbodé (on loan at Shrewsbury Town)
—	FW	ENG	Oli Lynch (on loan at Port Vale)

No.	Pos.	Nation	Player
—	FW	NOR	Lasse Nordås (on loan at Cracovia)
—	FW	ENG	Jerry Yates (on loan at Blackpool)

=== Academy ===
==== Under-21s Development Squad ====
As of 13 November 2026

Note: Flags indicate national team as defined under FIFA eligibility rules; some limited exceptions apply. Players may hold more than one non-FIFA nationality.

No.	Pos.	Nation	Player
—	GK	ENG	Charlie Booth
—	GK	ENG	Jake Hopper
—	DF	ENG	Dempsy Crace
—	DF	ENG	Louie Henry
—	DF	ENG	Kyron Roberts-Edema

No.	Pos.	Nation	Player
—	MF	ALB	Alvin Isufi
—	MF	ENG	Archie Shepherd
—	MF	ENG	Charlie Trustram
—	FW	ENG	Garry Gibbs
—	FW	COL	Samuel Hincapie-Alfonso

==== Out on loan ====
No.	Pos.	Nation	Player
36	MF	CYP	Zach Ioannides (on loan at Folkestone Invicta until 1 January 2027)
41	GK	ENG	Lucas Thomas (on loan at Havant & Waterlooville until 30 June 2027)
48	MF	ENG	Jack Lorentzen-Jones (on loan at Brackley Town until 1 January 2027)
—	GK	ENG	Ben Nightingale (on loan at Leighton Town until 20 January 2027)

No.	Pos.	Nation	Player
—	MF	NIR	Dylan Stitt (on loan at Dorking Wanderers until 1 December 2026)
—	FW	ENG	Taylan Harris (on loan at Woking until 30 June 2027)
—	FW	ENG	Tate Xavier-Jones (on loan at Farnborough until 18 November 2026)
—	FW	ENG	Jamie Odegah (on loan at Chelmsford City until 30 June 2027)

==== Under-18 Scholars ====
As of 17 November 2026

No.	Pos.	Nation	Player
43	MF	MAR	Nassim El Gourja
49	FW	POL	Dawid Gawel
—	GK	ENG	Riley Flynn
—	DF	ENG	Rufus Barnes
—	DF	ENG	Corey Burton-Green
—	DF	WAL	Fin Evans
—	DF	ENG	Ben Norford
—	DF	ENG	Blake Norton
—	DF	ENG	Kyrese Richards
—	DF	ENG	Luke Takawira
—	MF	ENG	Beau Corcoran-Berkeley

No.	Pos.	Nation	Player
—	MF	ENG	Harrison Dunn
—	MF	ENG	Femi Fatogun
—	MF	ENG	Luca Knote-Reed
—	MF	ENG	Ty Lesser
—	MF	ENG	Luke McCulloch
—	MF	ENG	Jerome Passley-James
—	FW	ENG	Josiah Akinfenwa
—	FW	ENG	Excel Ed-Okungbowa
—	FW	ENG	Darren Frimpong-Kwakye
—	FW	ENG	Alfie Sharp

== Backroom staff ==
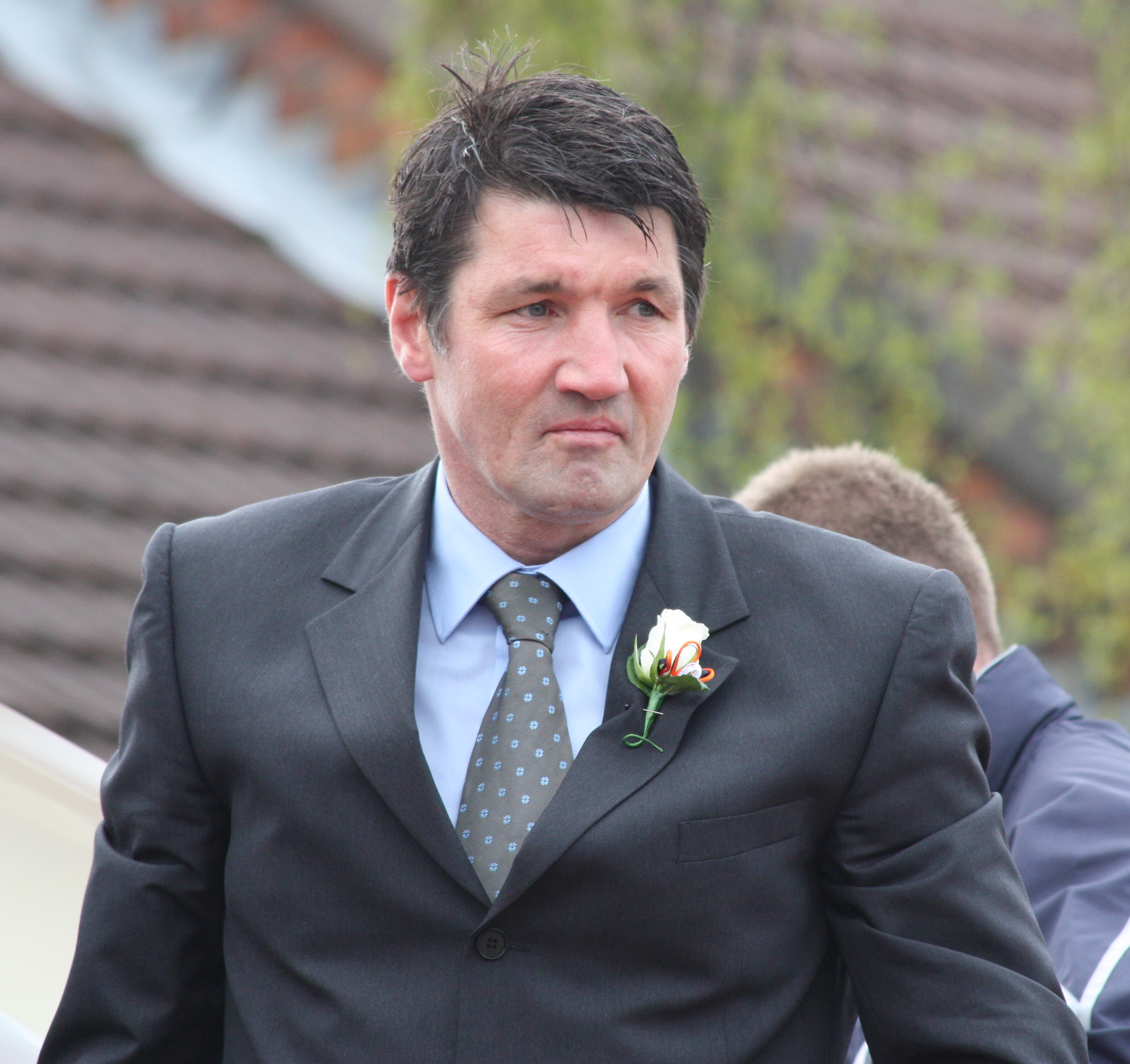
Senior scout and club ambassador Mick Harford, seen in 2009.

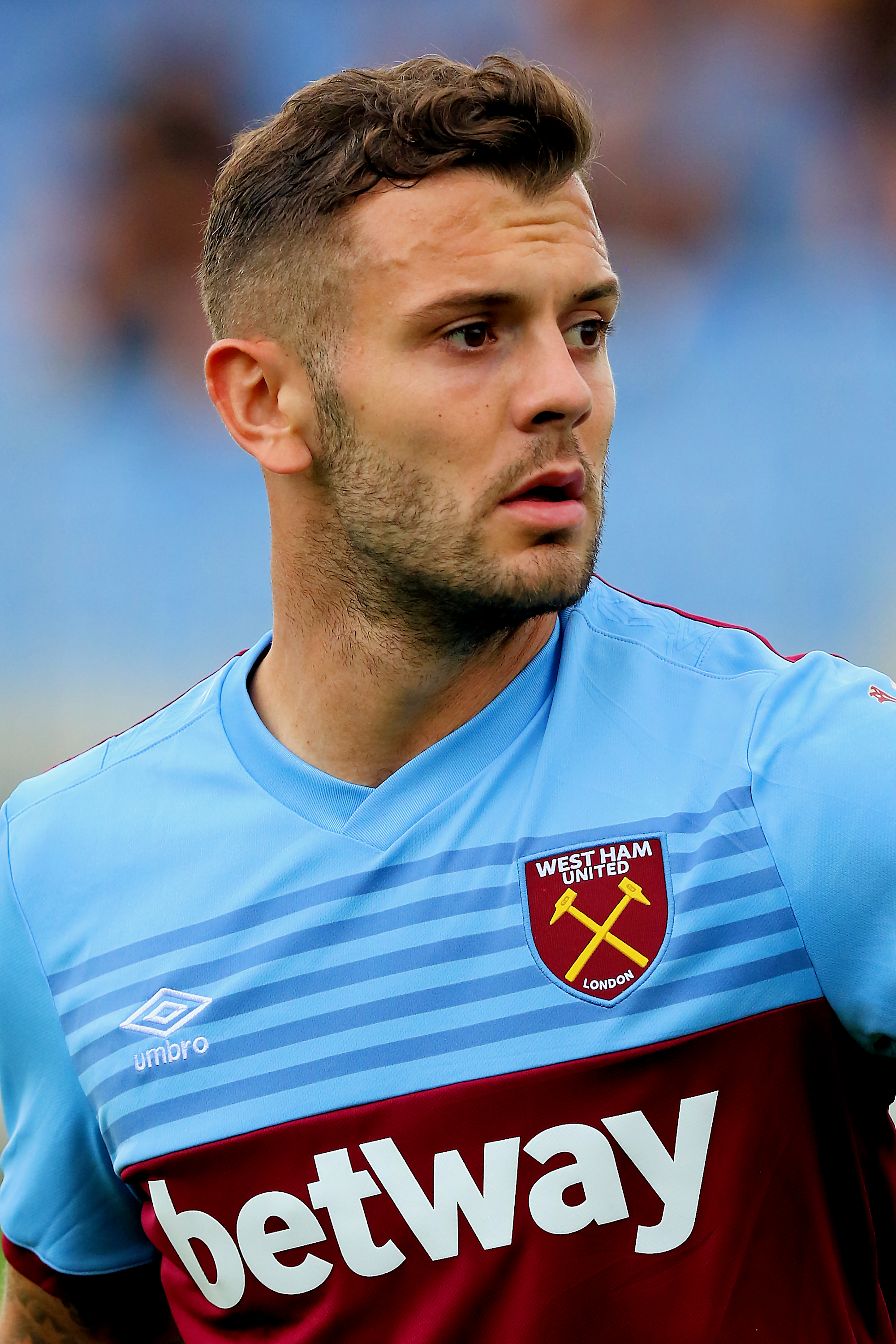
Current first-team manager Jack Wilshere, playing for West Ham United in 2019.

As of 7 August 2026

=== Ownership ===
Position	Name
Chairman	David Wilkinson
Chief Executive Officer	Gary Sweet
Directors	Paul Ballantyne
Directors	Bob Curson
Directors	Kailesh Karavadra
Directors	Rob Stringer
Directors	Glyn Taylor
Shareholders	Stephen Browne
Shareholders	Luton Town Supporters' Trust
Vice Presidents	Richard Banks
Vice Presidents	Gary Chamberlain
Vice Presidents	Doug Knight
Vice Presidents	Ian Gazeley
Vice Presidents	Emma Banks
Vice Presidents	Ben Banks
Vice Presidents	Ian Montone
Honorary Vice President	John Buttle

=== First Team staff ===
Position	Name
First Team Manager	Jack Wilshere
Assistant Manager	Chris Powell
Senior Scout & Club Ambassador	Mick Harford
Head of Goalkeeping	Kevin Pilkington
First Team Coaches	Kevin Foley
First Team Coaches	David Bridges
First Team Coaches	Tim Corcoran
Head of Physical Performance	Josh Hornby
Sport Scientist	Jake Scott
Strength & Conditioning Coach	Robbie Long
Head of Recruitment	William Lancefield
Chief Scout	Marc Tracy
Head of Analysis	Jack Lamb-Wilson
First Team Analyst	Lewis Holmes
Performance Analyst	Ben Day
Training Analyst	Jack Newark
Medical Co-ordinator	Simon Parsell
Head Physiotherapist	Chris Phillips
First Team Physiotherapist	Monika Jude
First Team Physiotherapist	Chris Horgan
Therapist	Darren Cook
Club Doctors	Monjour Ahmed
Club Doctors	Mohammed Al-Awazzi
Club Chiropractor	David Leu
Kit & Equipment	Stewart Bannister

=== Academy staff ===
Position	Name
Academy Manager	Paul Benson
Head of Academy Development	Wayne Turner
Under-21s Lead Coach & Loans Manager	Alex Lawless
Under-18s Lead Coach	Joe Deeney
Assistant PDP Coach	Ronnie Henry
Head of Coaching	Ben Strevens
Youth Development Phase Lead Coach (U15 & 16)	Jack Cartwright
Youth Development Phase Lead Coach (U13 & U14)	Billy Carter
Foundation Phase Lead Coach (U9 to U12)	Jack Ainsworth
Senior Academy Physiotherapist	Jayden Hay
Academy Administrator	Emily Howes

== Managers ==
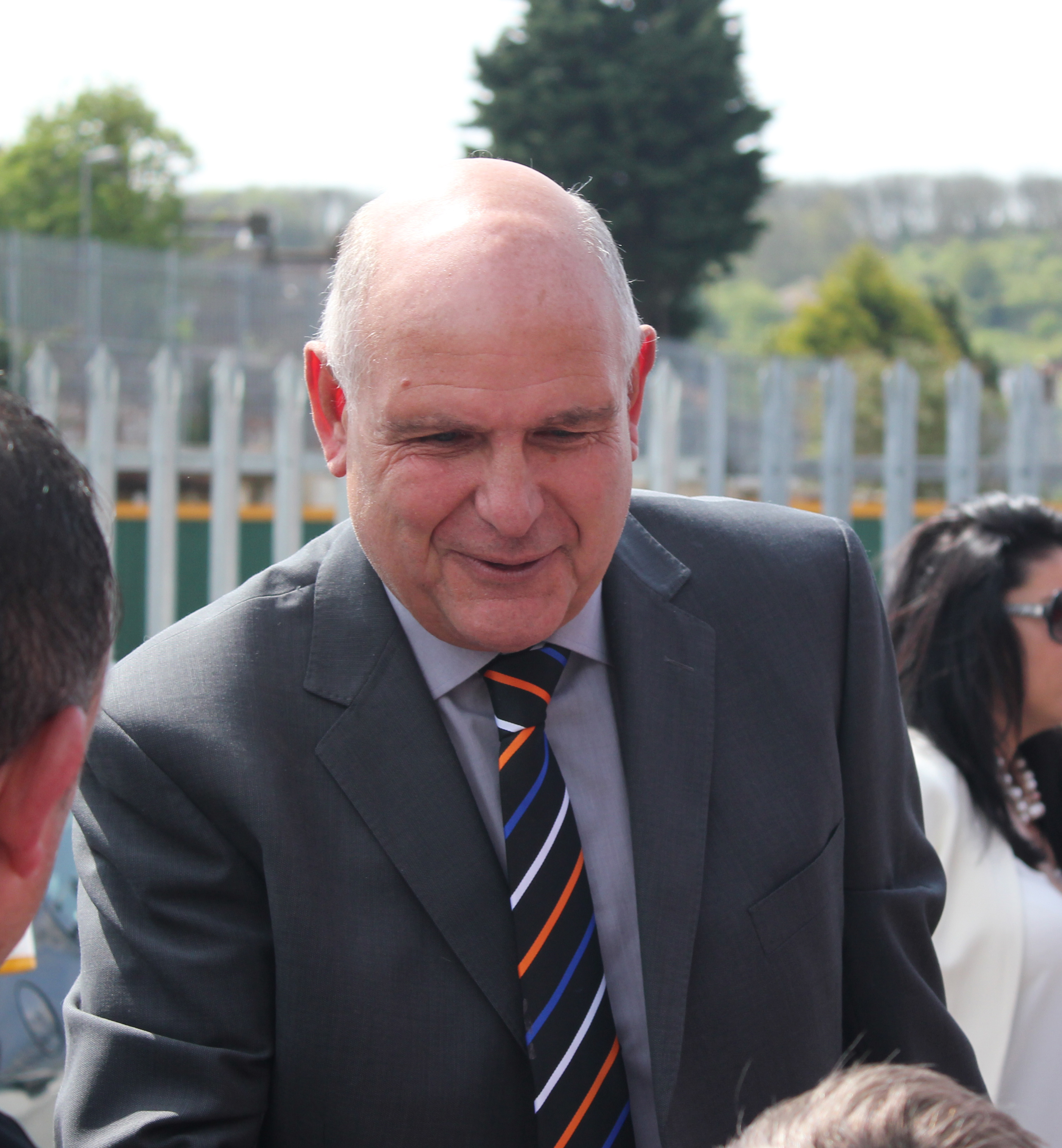
John Still, seen in 2014. He led the club to promotion back into the Football League in the same year.

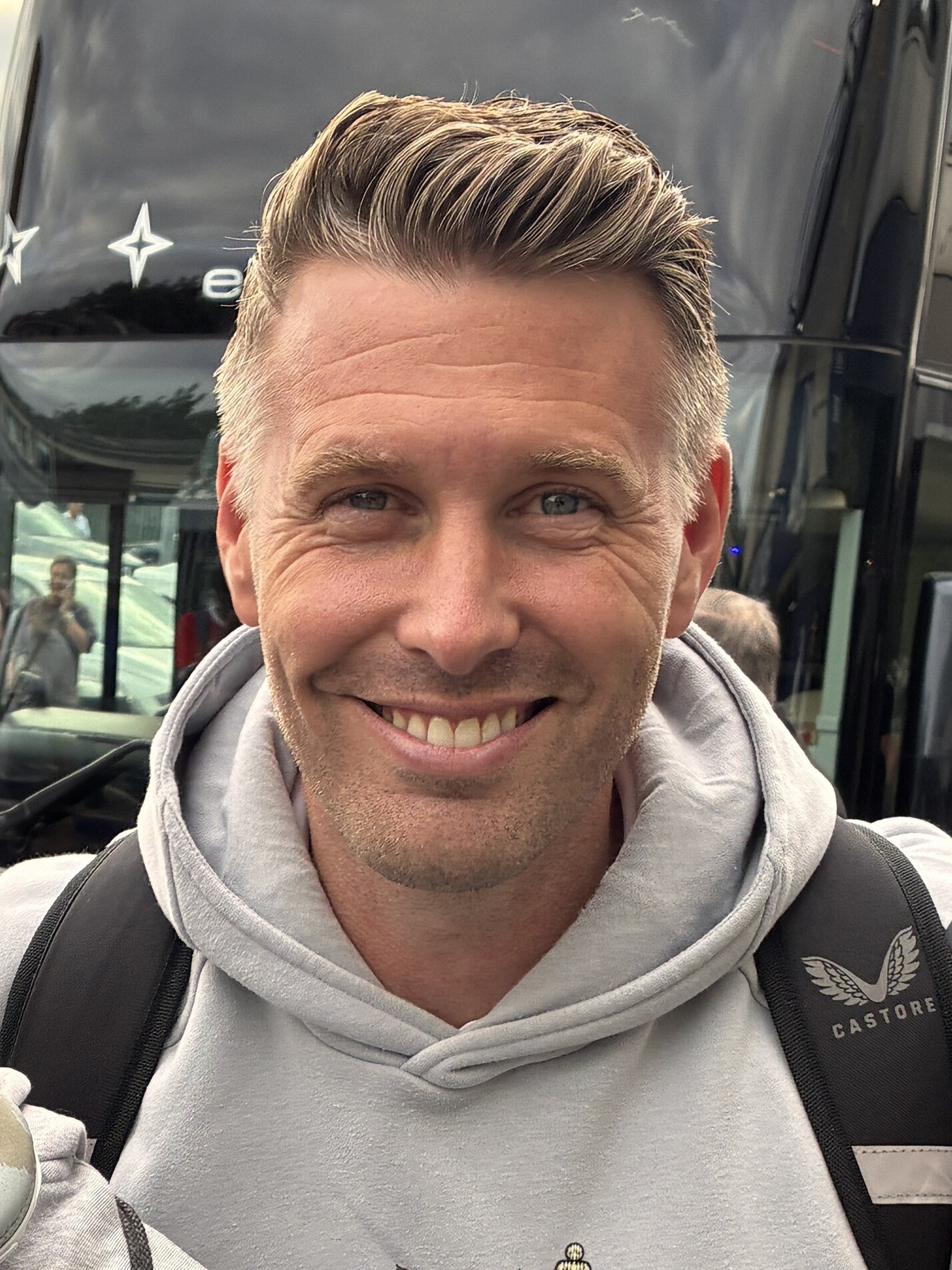
Rob Edwards, seen in 2025. In 2023, he led the club to promotion to the Premier League.

The current first team manager is Jack Wilshere, who was appointed on 13 October 2025.

=== List of former managers ===
As of 28 October 2026. Only managers in charge for a minimum of 50 competitive matches are listed.
Key: M = matches; W = matches won; D = matches drawn; L = matches lost

Name	Nation	From	To	M	W	D	L	Win %
John McCartney	Scotland	14 September 1927	21 December 1929	151	57	38	56	37.7
George Kay	England	23 December 1929	13 May 1931	71	29	16	26	40.8
Harold Wightman	England	1 June 1931	9 October 1935	198	85	49	64	42.9
Ned Liddell	England	13 August 1936	26 February 1938	79	42	11	26	53.2
Dally Duncan	Scotland	13 June 1947	16 October 1958	503	192	133	178	38.2
Sam Bartram	England	18 July 1960	14 June 1962	95	35	18	42	36.8
Bill Harvey	England	24 July 1962	21 November 1964	121	37	26	58	30.6
George Martin	Scotland	16 February 1965	3 November 1966	82	34	16	32	41.5
Allan Brown	Scotland	4 November 1966	17 December 1968	111	56	24	31	50.5
Alec Stock	England	20 December 1968	27 April 1972	172	71	56	45	41.3
Harry Haslam	England	4 May 1972	23 January 1978	275	110	69	96	40.0
David Pleat	England	24 January 1978	16 May 1986	393	158	108	127	40.2
Ray Harford	England	16 June 1987	3 January 1990	133	51	34	48	38.3
Jim Ryan	Scotland	11 January 1990	13 May 1991	63	18	16	29	28.6
David Pleat	England	7 June 1991	11 June 1995	207	55	70	82	26.6
Lennie Lawrence	England	21 December 1995	4 July 2000	250	90	66	94	36.0
Joe Kinnear	Ireland	8 February 2001	23 May 2003	122	56	28	38	45.9
Mike Newell	England	23 June 2003	15 March 2007	200	83	49	68	41.5
Mick Harford	England	16 January 2008	1 October 2009	91	25	29	37	27.5
Richard Money	England	30 October 2009	28 March 2011	83	45	21	17	54.2
Gary Brabin	England	28 March 2011	31 March 2012	62	29	22	11	46.8
Paul Buckle	England	6 April 2012	19 February 2013	52	26	10	16	50.0
John Still	England	26 February 2013	17 December 2015	148	69	38	41	46.6
Nathan Jones	Wales	6 January 2016	9 January 2019	170	87	46	37	51.2
Nathan Jones	Wales	28 May 2020	10 November 2022	133	54	37	42	40.6
Rob Edwards	Wales	17 November 2022	9 January 2025	103	32	25	46	31.1
Jack Wilshere	England	13 October 2025	Present	59	30	14	15	50.8

== Honours ==
Luton Town's major honours are detailed below. For a list of all club honours, see List of Luton Town F.C. records and statistics#Honours and achievements.

League

- Second Division / Championship (level 2)
  - Champions: 1981–82
  - Runners-up: 1954–55, 1973–74
  - Play-off winners: 2023
- Third Division South / Third Division / League One (level 3)
  - Champions: 1936–37 (South), 2004–05, 2018–19
  - Runners-up: 1935–36 (South), 1969–70
- Fourth Division / Third Division / League Two (level 4)
  - Champions: 1967–68
  - Runners-up: 2001–02, 2017–18
- Conference Premier (level 5)
  - Champions: 2013–14

Cup

- FA Cup
  - Runners-up: 1958–59
- Football League Cup
  - Winners: 1987–88
  - Runners-up: 1988–89
- Football League/EFL Trophy
  - Winners: 2008–09, 2025–26
- Full Members' Cup
  - Runners-up: 1987–88

== Footnotes ==
A. The only other club from the south of England in the Football League at the time was Woolwich Arsenal.
B. Calculated by adding together all the home league attendances for the 2014–15 season to calculate the total attendance (200,157) and then dividing by the number of home league matches (23) to reach an average of 8,702. Attendances taken from BBC report for match that day and Soccerbase statistics.
C. Calculated by adding together all the home league attendances for the 2013–14 season to calculate the total attendance (169,906) and then dividing by the number of home league matches (23) to reach an average of 7,387. Attendances taken from BBC report for match that day and Soccerbase statistics.
D. Before the start of the 2004–05 season, Football League re-branding saw the First Division become the Football League Championship. The Second and Third Divisions became Leagues One and Two, respectively.
E. On its formation for the 1992–93 season, the FA Premier League became the top tier of English football; the First, Second and Third Divisions then became the second, third and fourth tiers, respectively.
