= 1975–76 Luton Town F.C. season =

English football club season

Luton Town
1975–76 season
- Chairman: Len Hawkins (until November 1975); Denis Mortimer
- Manager: Harry Haslam
- Stadium: Kenilworth Road
- Division Two: 7th
- League Cup: Second round
- FA Cup: Fourth round
- Top goalscorer: League: Jimmy Husband (14); All: Jimmy Husband (14)
- Highest home attendance: 19,024 v Chelsea (Division Two, 30 August 1975)
- Lowest home attendance: 7,646 v Bristol Rovers (Division Two, 19 April 1976)
- Average home league attendance: 10,587
- Biggest win: 5–1 v Charlton Athletic (A), Division Two, 3 December 1975
- Biggest defeat: 0–3 v Bolton Wanderers (A), Division Two, 27 January 1976; 0–3 v Plymouth Argyle (A), Division Two, 24 February 1976; 0–3 v Bristol City (A), Division Two, 6 March 1976; 0–3 v Orient (A), Division Two, 20 March 1976; 0–3 v Blackburn Rovers (A), Division Two, 3 April 1976

The 1975–76 season was the 90th in the history of Luton Town Football Club. Following relegation from the First Division the previous season, they finished 7th in the Second Division, in spite of a financial crisis which led to the sale of Peter Anderson to Royal Antwerp and directors paying wages with their own money to prevent the club from being closed down.

== Squad ==
Players who made one appearance or more for Luton Town F.C. during the 1975-76 season

| Pos. | Nat. | Name | League | | League Cup | | FA Cup | | Total | |
| Pos. | Nat. | Name | Apps | Goals | Apps | Goals | Apps | Goals | Apps | Goals |
|---|---|---|---|---|---|---|---|---|---|---|
| GK | ENG | Keith Barber | 42 | 0 | 1 | 0 | 2 | 0 | 45 | 0 |
| DF | ENG | Steve Buckley | 33 | 2 | 1 | 0 | 2 | 0 | 36 | 2 |
| DF | ENG | John Faulkner | 35 | 1 | 1 | 0 | 2 | 0 | 38 | 1 |
| DF | ENG | Paul Futcher | 41 | 0 | 1 | 0 | 2 | 0 | 44 | 0 |
| DF | ENG | Graham Jones | 1 | 0 | 0 | 0 | 0 | 0 | 1 | 0 |
| DF | ENG | Steve Litt | 1 | 0 | 0 | 0 | 0 | 0 | 1 | 0 |
| DF | WAL | Paul Price | 8 | 1 | 0 | 0 | 0 | 0 | 8 | 1 |
| DF | ENG | John Ryan | 41 | 2 | 1 | 0 | 2 | 0 | 44 | 2 |
| DF | ENG | Bobby Thomson | 6 | 0 | 0 | 0 | 0 | 0 | 6 | 0 |
| MF | ENG | Peter Anderson | 17 | 5 | 1 | 0 | 0 | 0 | 18 | 5 |
| MF | ENG | John Aston | 28(2) | 1 | 1 | 0 | 2 | 0 | 31(2) | 1 |
| MF | ENG | Brian Chambers | 30(3) | 6 | 1 | 0 | 2 | 1 | 33(3) | 7 |
| MF | ENG | Lil Fuccillo | 14 | 3 | 0 | 0 | 0 | 0 | 14 | 3 |
| MF | ENG | Ricky Hill | 1(1) | 1 | 0 | 0 | 0 | 0 | 1(1) | 1 |
| MF | ENG | Andy King | 30(2) | 9 | 1 | 0 | 2 | 0 | 33(2) | 9 |
| MF | SCO | Maitland Pollock | 3(3) | 0 | 0 | 0 | 0 | 0 | 3(3) | 0 |
| MF | SCO | Jimmy Ryan | 12(3) | 0 | 0(1) | 0 | 0 | 0 | 12(4) | 0 |
| MF | ENG | John Seasman | 6 | 1 | 0 | 0 | 0 | 0 | 6 | 1 |
| MF | ENG | Peter Spiring | 7(1) | 1 | 1 | 0 | 0 | 0 | 8(1) | 1 |
| MF | ENG | Alan West | 36(1) | 2 | 0 | 0 | 2 | 0 | 38(1) | 2 |
| FW | AUS | Adrian Alston | 8 | 1 | 0 | 0 | 0 | 0 | 8 | 1 |
| FW | ENG | Ron Futcher | 31 | 10 | 1 | 1 | 2 | 1 | 34 | 12 |
| FW | ENG | Jimmy Husband | 28(2) | 14 | 0 | 0 | 2 | 0 | 30(2) | 14 |

== League table ==
| Pos | Team | Pld | W | D | L | GF | GA | GAv | Pts | Qualification or relegation |
|---|---|---|---|---|---|---|---|---|---|---|
| 5 | Notts County | 42 | 19 | 11 | 12 | 60 | 41 | 1.463 | 49 | |
| 6 | Southampton | 42 | 21 | 7 | 14 | 66 | 50 | 1.320 | 49 | Qualification for the Cup Winners' Cup first round (Note: Southampton qualified for the Cup Winners' Cup first round as the 1975–76 FA Cup winners.) |
| 7 | Luton Town | 42 | 19 | 10 | 13 | 61 | 51 | 1.196 | 48 | |
| 8 | Nottingham Forest | 42 | 17 | 12 | 13 | 55 | 40 | 1.375 | 46 | |
| 9 | Charlton Athletic | 42 | 15 | 12 | 15 | 61 | 72 | 0.847 | 42 | |

Rules for classification: 1) Points; 2) Goal average; 3) Goals scored

== Results ==
=== First Division ===
| 16 August 1975 1 | Luton Town | 2–0 | Hull City | Luton |
| | R. Futcher 21'; King 33' | | | Stadium: Kenilworth Road; Attendance: 10,389 |

| 23 August 1975 2 | West Bromwich Albion | 1–0 | Luton Town | West Bromwich |
| | Trewick 75' | | | Stadium: The Hawthorns; Attendance: 13,875 |

| 30 August 1975 3 | Luton Town | 3–0 | Chelsea | Luton |
| | Anderson 27'; Buckley 46' (pen.); R. Futcher 57' | | | Stadium: Kenilworth Road; Attendance: 19,024 |

| 6 September 1975 4 | Portsmouth | 0–2 | Luton Town | Portsmouth |
| | | | King 39'; Alston 55' | Stadium: Fratton Park; Attendance: 9,835 |

| 13 September 1975 5 | Luton Town | 0–2 | Bolton Wanderers | Luton |
| | | | P. Futcher 38' (o.g.); Curran 72' | Stadium: Kenilworth Road; Attendance: 11,217 |

| 20 September 1975 6 | Notts County | 1–0 | Luton Town | Nottingham |
| | Scanlon 66' | | | Stadium: Meadow Lane; Attendance: 11,173 |

| 24 September 1975 7 | Luton Town | 1–1 | Plymouth Argyle | Luton |
| | Husband 19' | | Johnson 60' | Stadium: Kenilworth Road; Attendance: 9,226 |

| 27 September 1975 8 | Luton Town | 1–1 | Blackburn Rovers | Luton |
| | Husband 54' | | Kenyon 66' | Stadium: Kenilworth Road; Attendance: 8,458 |

| 4 October 1975 9 | Blackpool | 3–2 | Luton Town | Blackpool |
| | Hart 40'; Suddaby 73'; Walsh 84' | | Anderson 5'; Spiring 52' | Stadium: Bloomfield Road; Attendance: 7,864 |

| 11 October 1975 10 | Carlisle United | 1–1 | Luton Town | Carlisle |
| | Clarke 18' | | Seasman 11' | Stadium: Brunton Park; Attendance: 6,621 |

| 18 October 1975 11 | Luton Town | 1–0 | Fulham | Luton |
| | Chambers 27' | | | Stadium: Kenilworth Road; Attendance: 14,086 |

| 21 October 1975 12 | Nottingham Forest | 0–0 | Luton Town | West Bridgford |
| | | | | Stadium: City Ground; Attendance: 12,290 |

| 25 October 1975 13 | Sunderland | 2–0 | Luton Town | Sunderland |
| | Kerr 55'; Robson 56' | | | Stadium: Roker Park; Attendance: 28,338 |

| 1 November 1975 14 | Luton Town | 0–0 | Bristol City | Luton |
| | | | | Stadium: Kenilworth Road; Attendance: 11,446 |

| 4 November 1975 15 | Luton Town | 4–0 | York City | Luton |
| | Husband 40'; West 58'; King 59'; Anderson 68' | | | Stadium: Kenilworth Road; Attendance: 7,982 |

| 8 November 1975 16 | Southampton | 3–1 | Luton Town | Southampton |
| | McCalliog 12'; Stokes 20'; Channon 75' | | John Ryan 84' | Stadium: The Dell; Attendance: 13,885 |

| 15 November 1975 17 | Luton Town | 2–3 | Oldham Athletic | Luton |
| | Husband 3'; Chambers 47' | | Chapman 25'; McVitie 26'; Shaw 89' | Stadium: Kenilworth Road; Attendance: 8,237 |

| 22 November 1975 18 | Fulham | 2–0 | Luton Town | London |
| | Conway 22', 82' | | | Stadium: Craven Cottage; Attendance: 9,626 |

| 29 November 1975 19 | Luton Town | 1–0 | Orient | Luton |
| | Husband 11' | | | Stadium: Kenilworth Road; Attendance: 7,898 |

| 3 December 1975 20 | Charlton Athletic | 1–5 | Luton Town | London |
| | Flanagan 8' | | Anderson 38', 72'; Husband 57', 59'; Chambers 60' | Stadium: The Valley; Attendance: 8,703 |

| 13 December 1975 21 | Luton Town | 2–1 | West Bromwich Albion | Luton |
| | King 44'; Aston 79' | | Martin 46' | Stadium: Kenilworth Road; Attendance: 10,203 |

| 20 December 1975 22 | Hull City | 1–2 | Luton Town | Hull |
| | Wood 49' | | Husband 25'; King 55' | Stadium: Boothferry Park; Attendance: 5,449 |

| 26 December 1975 23 | Luton Town | 3–2 | Oxford United | Luton |
| | R. Futcher 35', 41'; King 74' | | Shuker 87'; Jeffrey 89' | Stadium: Kenilworth Road; Attendance: 13,101 |

| 27 December 1975 24 | Bristol Rovers | 0–1 | Luton Town | Bristol |
| | | | King 88' | Stadium: Eastville; Attendance: 11,042 |

| 17 January 1976 25 | Luton Town | 3–1 | Portsmouth | Luton |
| | Faulkner 8'; King 37'; R. Futcher 58' | | Piper 71' | Stadium: Kenilworth Road; Attendance: 10,464 |

| 27 January 1976 26 | Bolton Wanderers | 3–0 | Luton Town | Bolton |
| | G. Jones 3'; Byrom 23'; Allardyce 36' | | | Stadium: Burnden Park; Attendance: 22,037 |

| 31 January 1976 27 | Luton Town | 1–1 | Nottingham Forest | Luton |
| | R. Futcher 71' | | Curran 67' | Stadium: Kenilworth Road; Attendance: 8,503 |

| 7 February 1976 28 | York City | 2–3 | Luton Town | York |
| | Holmes 34' (pen.); Pollard 75' | | Chambers 5'; R. Futcher 25'; Fuccillo 53' | Stadium: Bootham Crescent; Attendance: 3,507 |

| 21 February 1976 29 | Oldham Athletic | 1–1 | Luton Town | Oldham |
| | Shaw 33' | | Husband 86' | Stadium: Boundary Park; Attendance: 8,796 |

| 24 February 1976 30 | Plymouth Argyle | 3–0 | Luton Town | Plymouth |
| | Randell 14'; Rafferty 57', 58' | | | Stadium: Home Park; Attendance: 13,927 |

| 28 February 1976 31 | Luton Town | 2–0 | Sunderland | Luton |
| | Moncur 65' (o.g.); R. Futcher 85' | | | Stadium: Kenilworth Road; Attendance: 15,338 |

| 2 March 1976 32 | Luton Town | 1–0 | Southampton | Luton |
| | Husband 72' | | | Stadium: Kenilworth Road; Attendance: 13,737 |

| 6 March 1976 33 | Bristol City | 3–0 | Luton Town | Bristol |
| | Ritchie 54', 57'; Cheesley 72' | | | Stadium: Ashton Gate; Attendance: 15,872 |

| 13 March 1976 34 | Luton Town | 3–0 | Carlisle United | Luton |
| | Husband 12', 83'; King 60' | | | Stadium: Kenilworth Road; Attendance: 8,856 |

| 20 March 1976 35 | Orient | 3–0 | Luton Town | London |
| | Bennett 31', 37'; Heppolette 56' | | | Stadium: Brisbane Road; Attendance: 5,544 |

| 27 March 1976 36 | Luton Town | 1–1 | Charlton Athletic | Luton |
| | John Ryan 39' | | Hales 78' | Stadium: Kenilworth Road; Attendance: 9,947 |

| 3 April 1976 37 | Blackburn Rovers | 3–0 | Luton Town | Blackburn |
| | Parkes 24'; Waddington 47'; Beamish 75' | | | Stadium: Ewood Park; Attendance: 7,911 |

| 10 April 1976 38 | Luton Town | 1–1 | Notts County | Luton |
| | West 43' | | Sims 77' | Stadium: Kenilworth Road; Attendance: 8,277 |

| 16 April 1976 39 | Chelsea | 2–2 | Luton Town | London |
| | Finnieston 33'; Hay 53' | | Husband 12'; Chambers 63' | Stadium: Stamford Bridge; Attendance: 19,873 |

| 17 April 1976 40 | Oxford United | 1–3 | Luton Town | Oxford |
| | Clarke 33' | | Buckley 23'; Fuccillo 78'; Husband 89' | Stadium: Manor Ground; Attendance: 7,881 |

| 19 April 1976 41 | Luton Town | 3–1 | Bristol Rovers | Luton |
| | Price 58'; Chambers 86'; Hill 87' | | Britten 42' | Stadium: Kenilworth Road; Attendance: 7,646 |

| 24 April 1976 42 | Luton Town | 3–0 | Blackpool | Luton |
| | R. Futcher 20', 42'; Fuccillo 71' | | | Stadium: Kenilworth Road; Attendance: 8,757 |

=== League Cup ===
| 9 September 1975 Second Round | Darlington | 2–1 | Luton Town | Darlington |
| | Webb 62', 68' | | R. Futcher 42' | Stadium: Feethams; Attendance: 6,601 |

=== FA Cup ===
| 3 January 1976 Third Round | Luton Town | 2–0 | Blackburn Rovers | Luton |
| | R. Futcher 70'; Chambers 76' | | | Stadium: Kenilworth Road; Attendance: 11,195 |

| 24 January 1976 Fourth Round | Norwich City | 2–0 | Luton Town | Norwich |
| | Peters 24'; Jones 55' | | | Stadium: Carrow Road; Attendance: 24,328 |
