= 1976–77 Luton Town F.C. season =

English football club season

Luton Town
1976–77 season
- Chairman: Denis Mortimer
- Manager: Harry Haslam
- Stadium: Kenilworth Road
- Division Two: 6th
- League Cup: Second round
- FA Cup: Fourth round
- Top goalscorer: League: Ron Futcher (13); All: Ron Futcher and Jimmy Husband (13)
- Highest home attendance: 19,929 v Fulham (Division Two, 18 September 1976)
- Lowest home attendance: 7,066 v Bristol Rovers (Division Two, 6 November 1976)
- Average home league attendance: 11,814
- Biggest win: 5–0 v Carlisle United (H), Division Two, 26 March 1977
- Biggest defeat: 1–4 v Southampton (H), Division Two, 23 October 1976

The 1976–77 season was the 91st in the history of Luton Town Football Club and their second consecutively in the Football League Second Division following relegation from the First Division in 1975.

After a disappointing first half to the season, Luton muscled in on the promotion race with a 12-match unbeaten run (including nine straight wins), but lost five of the next seven and eventually finished 6th, four points behind third-placed Nottingham Forest.

== Squad ==
Players who made one appearance or more for Luton Town F.C. during the 1976-77 season

Pos.	Nat.	Name	League		League Cup		FA Cup		Total	
Pos.	Nat.	Name	Apps	Goals	Apps	Goals	Apps	Goals	Apps	Goals
GK	ENG	Milija Aleksic	25	0	0	0	2	0	27	0
GK	ENG	Keith Barber	15	0	1	0	0	0	16	0
GK	ENG	Tony Knight	2	0	0	0	0	0	2	0
DF	ENG	Steve Buckley	42	3	1	0	2	0	45	3
DF	ENG	John Faulkner	40	0	1	0	2	0	43	0
DF	ENG	Paul Futcher	40	1	1	0	2	0	43	1
DF	ENG	Graham Jones	4(3)	0	0	0	0	0	4(3)	0
DF	SCO	Jim McNichol	2	0	0	0	0	0	2	0
DF	WAL	Paul Price	41	1	1	0	2	0	44	1
MF	ENG	John Aston	34(1)	10	1	0	2	1	37(1)	11
MF	ENG	Dave Carr	1	0	0	0	0	0	1	0
MF	ENG	Brian Chambers	37	3	1	0	2	0	40	3
MF	ENG	Lil Fuccillo	42	6	1	0	2	0	45	6
MF	ENG	Ricky Hill	9(2)	4	1	0	0	0	10(2)	4
MF	SCO	Jimmy Ryan	10	0	0(1)	0	0	0	10(1)	0
MF	ENG	Tim Smith	0(1)	0	0	0	0	0	0(1)	0
MF	ENG	Alan West	33	3	0	0	2	0	35	3
FW	SCO	Dixie Deans	13(1)	6	1	0	0	0	14(1)	6
FW	ENG	Ron Futcher	30(3)	13	0	0	2	0	32(3)	13
FW	ENG	David Geddis (on loan from Ipswich Town)	9(4)	4	0	0	0	0	9(4)	4
FW	ENG	Jimmy Husband	33(3)	12	1	1	2	0	36(3)	13

== League table ==
Pos	Team	Pld	W	D	L	GF	GA	GD	Pts
4	Bolton Wanderers	42	20	11	11	75	54	+21	51
5	Blackpool	42	17	17	8	58	42	+16	51
6	Luton Town	42	21	6	15	67	48	+19	48
7	Charlton Athletic	42	16	16	10	71	58	+13	48
8	Notts County	42	19	10	13	65	60	+5	48

Rules for classification: 1) Points; 2) Goal difference; 3) Goals scored

== Results ==
=== First Division ===
21 August 1976 1	Luton Town	2–0	Sheffield United	Luton
	Deans 47', 58'			Stadium: Kenilworth Road; Attendance: 10,687

24 August 1976 2	Hull City	3–1	Luton Town	Hull
	Sunley 1'; Daniel 52' (pen.); Hemmerman 58'		Hill 4'	Stadium: Boothferry Park; Attendance: 5,499

28 August 1976 3	Burnley	1–2	Luton Town	Burnley
	Bradshaw 36'		Deans 41'; Hill 79'	Stadium: Turf Moor; Attendance: 12,262

4 September 1976 4	Luton Town	1–1	Nottingham Forest	Luton
	Barrett 88' (o.g.)		Curran 29' (pen.)	Stadium: Kenilworth Road; Attendance: 11,231

10 September 1976 5	Charlton Athletic	4–3	Luton Town	London
	Hales 26', 37', 60'; Curtis 71' (pen.)		Deans 22'; Aston 62'; Hill 86'	Stadium: The Valley; Attendance: 9,191

18 September 1976 6	Luton Town	0–2	Fulham	Luton
			Barrett 34'; Marsh 64'	Stadium: Kenilworth Road; Attendance: 19,929

25 September 1976 7	Wolverhampton Wanderers	1–2	Luton Town	Wolverhampton
	Hibbitt 60'		Husband 28'; Deans 65'	Stadium: Molineux; Attendance: 19,826

2 October 1976 8	Plymouth Argyle	1–0	Luton Town	Plymouth
	Johnson 48' (pen.)			Stadium: Home Park; Attendance: 12,187

9 October 1976 9	Luton Town	2–0	Hereford United	Luton
	Husband 54'; P. Futcher 88'			Stadium: Kenilworth Road; Attendance: 9,395

16 October 1976 10	Carlisle United	1–1	Luton Town	Carlisle
	Rafferty 37'		Husband 19'	Stadium: Brunton Park; Attendance: 6,972

23 October 1976 11	Luton Town	1–4	Southampton	Luton
	Chambers 69'		Peach 12' (pen.), 39'; MacDougall 77'; Holmes 85'	Stadium: Kenilworth Road; Attendance: 12,123

30 October 1976 12	Blackburn Rovers	1–0	Luton Town	Blackburn
	Silvester 12'			Stadium: Ewood Park; Attendance: 8,674

6 November 1976 13	Luton Town	4–2	Bristol Rovers	Luton
	R. Futcher 9', 47'; Aston 40'; Husband 67'		Bannister 32'; Warboys 59'	Stadium: Kenilworth Road; Attendance: 7,066

13 November 1976 14	Millwall	4–2	Luton Town	London
	Kitchener 3'; Brisley 33'; Walker 79'; Seasman 90'		West 2'; Buckley 51' (pen.)	Stadium: The Den; Attendance: 10,380

20 November 1976 15	Luton Town	2–1	Cardiff City	Luton
	Deans 15'; R. Futcher 31'		Evans 75'	Stadium: Kenilworth Road; Attendance: 8,845

27 November 1976 16	Notts County	0–4	Luton Town	Nottingham
			West 39'; Aston 60'; Husband 81'; Buckley 85'	Stadium: Meadow Lane; Attendance: 10,009

4 December 1976 17	Luton Town	0–0	Blackpool	Luton
				Stadium: Kenilworth Road; Attendance: 9,183

21 December 1976 18	Bolton Wanderers	2–1	Luton Town	Bolton
	Whatmore 62'; Greaves 74'		Fuccillo 33'	Stadium: Burnden Park; Attendance: 18,463

27 December 1976 19	Orient	1–0	Luton Town	Luton
	Bennett 78'			Stadium: Brisbane Road; Attendance: 8,354

29 December 1976 20	Luton Town	4–0	Chelsea	Luton
	Fuccillo 2'; Chambers 12'; Husband 58'; Buckley 88' (pen.)			Stadium: Kenilworth Road; Attendance: 17,107

1 January 1977 21	Bristol Rovers	1–0	Luton Town	Bristol
	Aitken 53'			Stadium: Eastville; Attendance: 7,185

22 January 1977 22	Sheffield United	0–3	Luton Town	Sheffield
			R. Futcher 11'; Husband 60', 74'	Stadium: Bramall Lane; Attendance: 16,257

24 January 1977 23	Luton Town	2–1	Hull City	Luton
	Aston 84'; Husband 89'		Lyall 3'	Stadium: Kenilworth Road; Attendance: 8,455

5 February 1977 24	Luton Town	2–0	Burnley	Luton
	Price 12'; Aston 82'			Stadium: Kenilworth Road; Attendance: 8,638

12 February 1977 25	Nottingham Forest	1–2	Luton Town	West Bridgford
	Lloyd 86'		R. Futcher 54'; Aston 72'	Stadium: City Ground; Attendance: 18,225

15 February 1977 26	Luton Town	2–0	Blackburn Rovers	Luton
	Geddis 35'; R. Futcher 65'			Stadium: Kenilworth Road; Attendance: 9,044

19 February 1977 27	Luton Town	2–0	Charlton Athletic	Luton
	R. Futcher 58', 78'			Stadium: Kenilworth Road; Attendance: 11,625

26 February 1977 28	Fulham	1–2	Luton Town	London
	Warboys 25'		Aston 20'; Husband 33'	Stadium: Craven Cottage; Attendance: 11,071

5 March 1977 29	Luton Town	2–0	Wolverhampton Wanderers	Luton
	Husband 35'; Fuccillo 36'			Stadium: Kenilworth Road; Attendance: 19,200

8 March 1977 30	Luton Town	1–0	Oldham Athletic	Luton
	Geddis 87'			Stadium: Kenilworth Road; Attendance: 12,301

12 March 1977 31	Luton Town	1–1	Plymouth Argyle	Luton
	Aston 46'		Foster 13'	Stadium: Kenilworth Road; Attendance: 12,793

19 March 1977 32	Hereford United	0–1	Luton Town	Hereford
			R. Futcher 89'	Stadium: Edgar Street; Attendance: 6,737

26 March 1977 33	Luton Town	5–0	Carlisle United	Luton
	Fuccillo 19'; R. Futcher 39'; Husband 61'; West 75'; Aston 89'			Stadium: Kenilworth Road; Attendance: 11,735

2 April 1977 34	Southampton	1–0	Luton Town	Southampton
	Ball 15'			Stadium: The Dell; Attendance: 19,923

9 April 1977 35	Chelsea	2–0	Luton Town	London
	Finnieston 14'; Sparrow 38'			Stadium: Stamford Bridge; Attendance: 32,911

11 April 1977 36	Luton Town	0–0	Orient	Luton
				Stadium: Kenilworth Road; Attendance: 11,066

12 April 1977 37	Luton Town	1–2	Millwall	Luton
	Fuccillo 49'		Buckley 42' (o.g.); Alexander 44'	Stadium: Kenilworth Road; Attendance: 10,459

16 April 1977 38	Cardiff City	4–2	Luton Town	Cardiff
	Sayer 9'; Friday 22', 37'; Dwyer 81'		R. Futcher 12'; Chambers 67'	Stadium: Ninian Park; Attendance: 10,438

23 April 1977 39	Luton Town	4–2	Notts County	Luton
	R. Futcher 23', 43'; Hill 44'; Geddis 70'		Bradd 30'; Mann 87'	Stadium: Kenilworth Road; Attendance: 9,585

30 April 1977 40	Blackpool	1–0	Luton Town	Blackpool
	Hatton 85'			Stadium: Bloomfield Road; Attendance: 9,257

7 May 1977 41	Luton Town	1–1	Bolton Wanderers	Luton
	Geddis 48'		Reid 8'	Stadium: Kenilworth Road; Attendance: 11,164

14 May 1977 42	Oldham Athletic	1–2	Luton Town	Oldham
	Halom 60'		Fuccillo 13'; Aston 65'	Stadium: Boundary Park; Attendance: 7,231

=== League Cup ===
31 August 1976 Second Round	Sunderland	3–1	Luton Town	Sunderland
	Hughes 24', 38'; Robson 42'		Husband 26'	Stadium: Roker Park; Attendance: 22,390

=== FA Cup ===
8 January 1977 Third Round	Halifax Town	0–1	Luton Town	Halifax
			Aston 22'	Stadium: The Shay; Attendance: 5,519

29 January 1977 Fourth Round	Chester	1–0	Luton Town	Chester
	Edwards 90'			Stadium: Sealand Road; Attendance: 10,608
