= 1973–74 Luton Town F.C. season =

English football club season

Luton Town
1973–74 season
- Chairman: Robert Keens
- Manager: Harry Haslam
- Stadium: Kenilworth Road
- Division Two: 2nd
- League Cup: Fourth round
- FA Cup: Fifth round
- Top goalscorer: League: Barry Butlin (17); All: Barry Butlin (18)
- Highest home attendance: 25,712 v Leicester City (FA Cup, 16 February 1974)
- Lowest home attendance: 4,908 v Notts County (Division Two, 5 February 1974)
- Average home league attendance: 12,214
- Biggest win: 6–1 v Carlisle United (H), Division Two, 1 September 1973
- Biggest defeat: 0–4 v Nottingham Forest (A), Division Two, 25 August 1973; 0–4 v Leicester City (H), FA Cup, 16 February 1974

The 1973–74 season was the 88th in the history of Luton Town Football Club. They finished 2nd in the Second Division, clinching promotion to the First Division after an absence of 14 years with a 1–1 draw at West Bromwich Albion in their penultimate league match.

== Squad ==
Players who made one appearance or more for Luton Town F.C. during the 1973-74 season

Pos.	Nat.	Name	League		League Cup		FA Cup		Total	
Pos.	Nat.	Name	Apps	Goals	Apps	Goals	Apps	Goals	Apps	Goals
GK	ENG	Keith Barber	5	0	3	0	0	0	8	0
GK	ENG	Graham Horn	37	0	3	0	4	0	44	0
DF	ENG	John Faulkner	40	1	6	1	4	0	50	2
DF	ENG	Alan Garner	42	1	6	0	4	0	52	1
DF	ENG	Steve Litt	2	0	0	0	0	0	2	0
DF	ENG	John Ryan	29(2)	1	2	0	4	0	35(2)	1
DF	ENG	Don Shanks	27	0	6	1	2	0	35	1
DF	ENG	Bobby Thomson	42	1	6	0	4	0	52	1
MF	ENG	Peter Anderson	41	11	6	1	4	2	51	14
MF	ENG	John Aston	39	6	6	0	2(1)	1	47(1)	7
MF	ENG	Peter Cruse	3(1)	0	1(1)	0	0	0	4(2)	0
MF	NIR	Tom Finney	13(1)	5	4	1	2(1)	0	19(2)	6
MF	ENG	Gordon Hindson	3(4)	1	2	1	0	0	5(4)	2
MF	SCO	Jimmy Ryan	40	7	4	0	4	3	48	10
MF	ENG	Alan West	33	1	4	1	4	0	41	2
FW	ENG	Barry Butlin	36(1)	17	5	0	3	1	44(1)	18
FW	ENG	Rodney Fern	5(1)	1	1	0	1	0	7(1)	1
FW	ENG	Billy Holmes	0(1)	0	0	0	0	0	0(1)	0
FW	ENG	Jimmy Husband	22	8	0	0	2	0	24	8
FW	ENG	John Sims (on loan from Derby County)	3	1	1	0	0	0	4	1

== League table ==
Pos	Team	Pld	W	D	L	GF	GA	GAv	Pts	Qualification or relegation
1	Middlesbrough (C, P)	42	27	11	4	77	30	2.567	65	Promotion to the First Division
2	Luton Town (P)	42	19	12	11	64	51	1.255	50	Promotion to the First Division
3	Carlisle United (P)	42	20	9	13	61	48	1.271	49	Promotion to the First Division
4	Orient	42	15	18	9	55	42	1.310	48	
5	Blackpool	42	17	13	12	57	40	1.425	47	

Rules for classification: 1) Points; 2) Goal average; 3) Goals scored
(C) Champions; (P) Promoted

== Results ==
=== First Division ===
25 August 1973 1	Nottingham Forest	4–0	Luton Town	West Bridgford
	Jackson 12', 37' (pen.); Martin 48'; McKenzie 89'			Stadium: City Ground; Attendance: 10,793

1 September 1973 2	Luton Town	6–1	Carlisle United	Luton
	Finney 12', 20'; Anderson 14', 25'; Aston 21'; Butlin 35'		Owen 63'	Stadium: Kenilworth Road; Attendance: 7,231

8 September 1973 3	Bristol City	1–3	Luton Town	Bristol
	Gould 38' (pen.)		Aston 2'; Anderson 3'; Finney 47'	Stadium: Ashton Gate; Attendance: 12,208

11 September 1973 4	Notts County	1–1	Luton Town	Nottingham
	Bradd 54'		Finney 23'	Stadium: Meadow Lane; Attendance: 8,509

15 September 1973 5	Luton Town	3–3	Portsmouth	Luton
	Thomson 33'; Garner 35'; Finney 75'		Kellard 17'; Lewis 57' (pen.); Davies 63'	Stadium: Kenilworth Road; Attendance: 11,552

22 September 1973 6	Sunderland	0–1	Luton Town	Sunderland
			Butlin 34'	Stadium: Roker Park; Attendance: 27,582

29 September 1973 7	Luton Town	3–0	Blackpool	Luton
	Butlin 13', 23'; Anderson 47'			Stadium: Kenilworth Road; Attendance: 10,365

6 October 1973 8	Crystal Palace	1–2	Luton Town	London
	Rogers 58'		Anderson 50'; Butlin 61'	Stadium: Selhurst Park; Attendance: 19,790

13 October 1973 9	Luton Town	2–1	Swindon Town	Luton
	Aston 20' (pen.); Anderson 44'		Jenkins 22'	Stadium: Kenilworth Road; Attendance: 10,732

20 October 1973 10	Orient	2–0	Luton Town	London
	Queen 67'; Fairbrother 82'			Stadium: Brisbane Road; Attendance: 11,135

27 October 1973 11	Luton Town	2–2	Hull City	Luton
	Anderson 28'; Butlin 36'		Greenwood 42'; Lord 44'	Stadium: Kenilworth Road; Attendance: 11,408

3 November 1973 12	Middlesbrough	2–1	Luton Town	Middlesbrough
	Foggon 51'; Armstrong 55'		Butlin 32'	Stadium: Ayresome Park; Attendance: 22,590

10 November 1973 13	Luton Town	2–1	Bolton Wanderers	Luton
	Jimmy Ryan 54'; McAllister 87' (o.g.)		Whatmore 40'	Stadium: Kenilworth Road; Attendance: 9,528

14 November 1973 14	Cardiff City	0–0	Luton Town	Cardiff
				Stadium: Ninian Park; Attendance: 5,839

17 November 1973 15	Luton Town	2–1	Sheffield Wednesday	Luton
	Aston 15'; Sims 42'		Joicey 45'	Stadium: Kenilworth Road; Attendance: 9,543

24 November 1973 16	Preston North End	2–2	Luton Town	Deepdale
	Young 15', 38'		Aston 29'; Fern 51'	Stadium: Preston; Attendance: 10,279

1 December 1973 17	Luton Town	0–2	West Bromwich Albion	Luton
			Shaw 66'; Hartford 84'	Stadium: Kenilworth Road; Attendance: 10,192

8 December 1973 18	Millwall	0–1	Luton Town	London
			Butlin 51'	Stadium: The Den; Attendance: 6,965

12 December 1973 19	Luton Town	1–0	Cardiff City	Luton
	Jimmy Ryan 47'			Stadium: Kenilworth Road; Attendance: 7,139

15 December 1973 20	Luton Town	1–0	Aston Villa	Luton
	Anderson 53'			Stadium: Kenilworth Road; Attendance: 10,020

22 December 1973 21	Blackpool	3–0	Luton Town	Blackpool
	Burns 46', 54', 71'			Stadium: Bloomfield Road; Attendance: 7,796

26 December 1973 22	Luton Town	1–1	Fulham	Luton
	Fraser 7' (o.g.)		John Conway 78'	Stadium: Kenilworth Road; Attendance: 15,259

29 December 1973 23	Luton Town	1–0	Bristol City	Luton
	Anderson 37'			Stadium: Kenilworth Road; Attendance: 11,398

1 January 1974 24	Carlisle United	2–0	Luton Town	Carlisle
	Green 56'; Martin 72'			Stadium: Brunton Park; Attendance: 9,255

12 January 1974 25	Portsmouth	0–0	Luton Town	Portsmouth
				Stadium: Fratton Park; Attendance: 18,476

19 January 1974 26	Luton Town	2–2	Nottingham Forest	Luton
	Jimmy Ryan 13', 90' (pen.)		McKenzie 12'; Richardson 72'	Stadium: Kenilworth Road; Attendance: 11,888

2 February 1974 27	Aston Villa	0–1	Luton Town	Birmingham
			Jimmy Ryan 90' (pen.)	Stadium: Villa Park; Attendance: 26,180

5 February 1974 28	Luton Town	1–1	Notts County	Luton
	Anderson 65'		Probert 80'	Stadium: Kenilworth Road; Attendance: 4,908

23 February 1974 29	Luton Town	2–1	Crystal Palace	Luton
	Jimmy Ryan 33' (pen.); Butlin 71'		Possee 80'	Stadium: Kenilworth Road; Attendance: 14,287

26 February 1974 30	Swindon Town	0–2	Luton Town	Swindon
			Butlin 23', 43'	Stadium: County Ground; Attendance: 2,600

5 March 1974 31	Fulham	2–1	Luton Town	London
	Lloyd 58', 82'		Husband 57'	Stadium: Craven Cottage; Attendance: 10,071

9 March 1974 32	Hull City	1–3	Luton Town	Hull
	O'Riley 78'		West 18'; Anderson 53'; Aston 75'	Stadium: Boothferry Park; Attendance: 7,027

16 March 1974 33	Luton Town	3–1	Orient	Luton
	Husband 5', 76', 80'		Hoadley 10'	Stadium: Kenilworth Road; Attendance: 17,045

23 March 1974 34	Bolton Wanderers	1–0	Luton Town	Bolton
	Greaves 80'			Stadium: Burnden Park; Attendance: 15,616

30 March 1974 35	Luton Town	0–1	Middlesbrough	Luton
			Mills 76'	Stadium: Kenilworth Road; Attendance: 19,812

6 April 1974 36	Luton Town	4–2	Preston North End	Luton
	Husband 3'; Butlin 30', 52', 66'		Burns 13'; Sadler 41'	Stadium: Kenilworth Road; Attendance: 11,806

12 April 1974 37	Oxford United	1–1	Luton Town	Oxford
	Curran 3'		Jimmy Ryan 19'	Stadium: Manor Ground; Attendance: 13,464

13 April 1974 38	Sheffield Wednesday	2–2	Luton Town	Sheffield
	Joicey 6'; Potts 46'		Husband 55'; Butlin 75'	Stadium: Hillsborough; Attendance: 16,492

16 April 1974 39	Luton Town	0–1	Oxford United	Luton
			Skeen 15'	Stadium: Kenilworth Road; Attendance: 16,353

20 April 1974 40	Luton Town	3–0	Millwall	Luton
	Faulkner 8'; Anderson 18'; Hindson 69'			Stadium: Kenilworth Road; Attendance: 15,740

27 April 1974 41	West Bromwich Albion	1–1	Luton Town	West Bromwich
	T. Brown 73' (pen.)		Butlin 5'	Stadium: The Hawthorns; Attendance: 13,227

1 May 1974 42	Luton Town	3–4	Sunderland	Luton
	Husband 17', 30'; Butlin 41'		Hughes 2'; Towers 25'; Ashurst 35'; Halom 78'	Stadium: Kenilworth Road; Attendance: 20,285

=== League Cup ===
10 October 1973 Second Round	Luton Town	1–1	Grimsby Town	Luton
	Hindson 22'		Chatterley 86'	Stadium: Kenilworth Road; Attendance: 9,656

16 October 1973 Second Round Replay	Grimsby Town	0–0 (a.e.t.)	Luton Town	Cleethorpes
				Stadium: Blundell Park; Attendance: 13,643

23 October 1973 Second Round Second Replay	Grimsby Town	0–2	Luton Town	Cleethorpes
			Finney 17'; Faulkner 39'	Stadium: Blundell Park; Attendance: 15,365

31 October 1973 Third Round	Luton Town	0–0	Bury	Luton
				Stadium: Kenilworth Road; Attendance: 8,191

6 November 1973 Third Round Replay	Bury	2–3	Luton Town	Bury
	Rudd (pen.); Hamstead		Anderson; Shanks; West	Stadium: Gigg Lane; Attendance: 7,827

21 November 1973 Fourth Round	Millwall	3–1	Luton Town	London
	Allder 37'; Kelly 46'; Clark 69'		Jones 64' (o.g.)	Stadium: The Den; Attendance: 8,777

=== FA Cup ===
5 January 1974 Third Round	Port Vale	1–1	Luton Town	Stoke-on-Trent
	Harris 60'		Jimmy Ryan 85'	Stadium: Vale Park; Attendance: 8,127

9 January 1974 Third Round Replay	Luton Town	4–2	Port Vale	Luton
	Aston 58'; Anderson 73', 89'; Jimmy Ryan 87'		Mountford 14'; Woodward 66'	Stadium: Kenilworth Road; Attendance: 5,833

26 January 1974 Fourth Round	Luton Town	3–0	Bradford City	Luton
	Fretwell 1' (o.g.); Butlin 38'; Jimmy Ryan 89'			Stadium: Kenilworth Road; Attendance: 12,470

16 February 1974 Fifth Round	Luton Town	0–4	Leicester City	Luton
			Earle 18', 48'; Worthington 60'; Weller 86'	Stadium: Kenilworth Road; Attendance: 25,712
