= 1974–75 Luton Town F.C. season =

English football club season

Luton Town
1974–75 season
- Chairman: Robert Keens (until 21 December 1974); Len Hawkins (from 21 December 1974)
- Manager: Harry Haslam
- Football League First Division: 20th (relegated)
- FA Cup: Third Round
- Football League Cup: Third Round
- Texaco Cup: Group Stage
- Top goalscorer: League: Adrian Alston (7); All: Adrian Alston (8)
- Highest home attendance: 23,096 vs Chelsea (First Division, 11 January 1975)
- Lowest home attendance: 10,073 vs Bristol Rovers (Football League Cup, 11 September 1974)
- Average home league attendance: 17,396
- Biggest win: 4–1 v Birmingham City (A), First Division, 19 April 1975
- Biggest defeat: 0–5 v Derby County (A), First Division, 29 March 1975
Home colours	Away colours

The 1974–75 season was the 89th season in the history of Luton Town Football Club. It was Luton Town's 55th consecutive season in the Football League, and their 58th overall. It was also the team's first season in the First Division since 1959–60, and their sixth overall. The season saw Luton narrowly relegated back to Division Two.

This article covers the period from 1 July 1974 to 30 June 1975.

== Background ==
Following promotion from the Fourth Division in 1966–67, Luton consolidated under first Allan Brown, then Alec Stock before rising another division following a successful 1969–70 campaign in which Malcolm Macdonald scored 28 goals. Macdonald scored 31 during 1970–71 as Luton finished sixth in the Second Division, and was sold to Newcastle United at the end of the season to ease the club's financial worries. Harry Haslam replaced Stock in 1972, and along with him came the ambition to return to Division One after a 12-year absence. Luton fans would have to wait two more years for Haslam to deliver the third promotion; in 1973–74 the team finished second in Division Two behind Middlesbrough, and ensured that for 1974–75 Luton would be a top division club once again.

== Review ==
=== July–September ===
After failing to progress past the group stage of the Texaco Cup, Luton began the campaign badly. The first victory came in the League Cup, as Luton beat Bristol Rovers on 11 September; in the league, a series of losses and draws prevailed. On the 28th, Luton finally won a league match, beating Carlisle United 3–1. This win lifted Luton out of the relegation places, and up to 17th in the division.

=== October–December ===
The team then went 11 matches without a victory, including a run of six straight defeats. Luton crashed out of the League Cup and by mid-December, they were bottom of the league and eight points away from safety. Starting with a 1–0 home win over Derby County, Luton suddenly won three successive matches and reduced the gap to five points.

=== January–March ===
A draw with Chelsea meant that Luton came off the foot of the table, but defeat at Burnley sent them straight back to the bottom, six points behind 19th placed Chelsea. A draw at Sheffield United, followed by a victory over Newcastle United and another draw with Stoke City, saw Luton come within four points of survival. A 3–1 defeat at Everton on 25 February resulted in no further ground being made up.

Two more straight defeats followed, and the gap remained four points. Luton then won three matches on the trot, against Carlisle, Leeds and Arsenal, to be only two points behind Chelsea. The team were brought back down to earth sharply towards the end of March by a 5–0 annihilation at Derby County and a 5–2 defeat at Wolverhampton Wanderers – these put Luton back down to 21st, though still only three points behind Leicester City in 19th.

=== April–May ===
Defeat at Tottenham Hotspur on 5 April sent Luton back to the bottom of the league and increased the gap to five points with only eight left to gain from Luton's final four matches. Luton managed a 2–1 home win over Everton, before beating Leicester 3–0 to be only one point away. A 4–1 victory at Birmingham put Luton level on points with Tottenham, with the North London team ahead on goal average. Manchester City would visit Luton on 26 April for their final match, while Tottenham would have to travel to Highbury to face their rivals Arsenal before entertaining Leeds United two days later. Luton could only draw with Manchester City, while Tottenham were defeated 1–0 at Arsenal; Luton therefore rose out of the relegation zone for the first time since October. However, Tottenham beat Leeds 4–2 on the 28th, and therefore leapfrogged Luton into 19th place. Thus, Luton were sentenced to Division Two football in 1975–76.

== Match results ==
=== Texaco Cup ===
3 August 1974 Group B	Luton Town	1–1	Southampton	Luton
	Butlin 40'		Chatterley 54'	Stadium: Kenilworth Road; Attendance: 8,445

7 August 1974 Group B	West Ham United	1–2	Luton Town	London
	Bonds 72' (pen.)		Husband 9'; Anderson 49'	Stadium: Upton Park; Attendance: 14,705

10 August 1974 Group B	Orient	2–2	Luton Town	London
	Walley 21'; Queen 87'		Husband 56'; Butlin 58'	Stadium: Brisbane Road; Attendance: 5,443

=== First Division ===
17 August 1974 1	Luton Town	1–2	Liverpool	Luton
	Butlin 27'		Smith 32'; Heighway 74'	Stadium: Kenilworth Road; Attendance: 21,216

19 August 1974 2	West Ham United	2–0	Luton Town	London
	Lampard 4'; Bonds 18'			Stadium: Upton Park; Attendance: 23,182

24 August 1974 3	Middlesbrough	1–1	Luton Town	Middlesbrough
	Mills 18'		Butlin 89'	Stadium: Ayresome Park; Attendance: 21,478

28 August 1974 4	Luton Town	0–0	West Ham United	Luton
				Stadium: Kenilworth Road; Attendance: 16,931

31 August 1974 5	Luton Town	1–1	Queens Park Rangers	Luton
	John Ryan 7'		Bowles 34' (pen.)	Stadium: Kenilworth Road; Attendance: 18,535

7 September 1974 6	Leeds United	1–1	Luton Town	Leeds
	Clarke 27'		Butlin 32'	Stadium: Elland Road; Attendance: 26,516

14 September 1974 7	Luton Town	1–4	Ipswich Town	Luton
	Alston 67'		Talbot 9', 58' (pen.); Hamilton 29'; Whymark 80'	Stadium: Kenilworth Road; Attendance: 17,577

21 September 1974 8	Arsenal	2–2	Luton Town	London
	Kidd 43', 62'		Alston 53'; Shanks 81'	Stadium: Highbury; Attendance: 21,649

24 September 1974 9	Coventry City	2–1	Luton Town	Coventry
	Stein 8'; Cross 40'		Jimmy Ryan 84' (pen.)	Stadium: Highfield Road; Attendance: 15,643

28 September 1974 10	Luton Town	3–1	Carlisle United	Luton
	Anderson 12'; Alston 56'; Jimmy Ryan 78' (pen.)		Laidlaw 37'	Stadium: Kenilworth Road; Attendance: 12,987

5 October 1974 11	Leicester City	0–0	Luton Town	Leicester
				Stadium: Filbert Street; Attendance: 19,024

12 October 1974 12	Luton Town	1–3	Birmingham City	Luton
	Hindson 11'		Francis 3', 5', 70'	Stadium: Kenilworth Road; Attendance: 15,097

16 October 1974 13	Luton Town	0–1	Middlesbrough	Luton
			Foggon 16'	Stadium: Kenilworth Road; Attendance: 10,464

19 October 1974 14	Manchester City	1–0	Luton Town	Manchester
	Summerbee 67'			Stadium: Maine Road; Attendance: 30,649

25 October 1974 15	Luton Town	1–1	Tottenham Hotspur	Luton
	Aston 87'		Chivers 67'	Stadium: Kenilworth Road; Attendance: 22,420

2 November 1974 16	Newcastle United	1–0	Luton Town	Newcastle upon Tyne
	Tudor 76'			Stadium: St James' Park; Attendance: 30,141

9 November 1974 17	Luton Town	0–1	Sheffield United	Luton
			Currie 58'	Stadium: Kenilworth Road; Attendance: 12,670

16 November 1974 18	Stoke City	4–2	Luton Town	Stoke-on-Trent
	Hudson 2'; Robertson 60'; Greenhoff 62', 67'		Anderson 29'; Garner 73'	Stadium: Victoria Ground; Attendance: 20,646

30 November 1974 19	Luton Town	2–3	Burnley	Luton
	Faulkner 42'; Spiring 52'		Hankin 36', 54'; James 49'	Stadium: Kenilworth Road; Attendance: 11,816

7 December 1974 20	Chelsea	2–0	Luton Town	London
	Hutchinson 49'; Kember 75'			Stadium: Stamford Bridge; Attendance: 19,009

14 December 1974 21	Liverpool	2–0	Luton Town	Liverpool
	Toshack 47'; Heighway 84'			Stadium: Anfield; Attendance: 35,151

21 December 1974 22	Luton Town	1–0	Derby County	Luton
	Jimmy Ryan 80' (pen.)			Stadium: Kenilworth Road; Attendance: 12,862

26 December 1974 23	Ipswich Town	0–1	Luton Town	Ipswich
			R. Futcher 90'	Stadium: Portman Road; Attendance: 23,406

28 December 1974 24	Luton Town	3–2	Wolverhampton Wanderers	Luton
	R. Futcher 38', 42', 83'		Munro 23'; Powell 69'	Stadium: Kenilworth Road; Attendance: 19,642

11 January 1975 25	Luton Town	1–1	Chelsea	Luton
	Husband 63'		Kember 82'	Stadium: Kenilworth Road; Attendance: 23,096

18 January 1975 26	Burnley	1–0	Luton Town	Burnley
	Ingham 34'			Stadium: Turf Moor; Attendance: 17,237

1 February 1975 27	Sheffield United	1–1	Luton Town	Sheffield
	Woodward 28'		Anderson 81'	Stadium: Bramall Lane; Attendance: 17,270

8 February 1975 28	Luton Town	1–0	Newcastle United	Luton
	R. Futcher 56'			Stadium: Kenilworth Road; Attendance: 18,019

22 February 1975 29	Luton Town	0–0	Stoke City	Luton
				Stadium: Kenilworth Road; Attendance: 19,894

25 February 1975 30	Everton	3–1	Luton Town	Liverpool
	Telfer 15'; Dobson 26'; Latchford 52'		Aston 68'	Stadium: Goodison Park; Attendance: 35,714

1 March 1975 31	Queens Park Rangers	2–1	Luton Town	London
	Givens 38'; Rogers 83'		Alston 39'	Stadium: Loftus Road; Attendance: 19,583

8 March 1975 32	Luton Town	1–3	Coventry City	Luton
	Aston 55'		Alderson 9', 25'; Green 78'	Stadium: Kenilworth Road; Attendance: 14,423

15 March 1975 33	Carlisle United	1–2	Luton Town	Carlisle
	Laidlaw 56'		Aston 62'; R. Futcher 87'	Stadium: Brunton Park; Attendance: 8,339

22 March 1975 34	Luton Town	2–1	Leeds United	Luton
	Aston 3'; Anderson 12'		Jordan 88'	Stadium: Kenilworth Road; Attendance: 23,048

25 March 1975 35	Luton Town	2–0	Arsenal	Luton
	Jimmy Ryan 48' (pen.); R. Futcher 56'			Stadium: Kenilworth Road; Attendance: 22,120

29 March 1975 36	Derby County	5–0	Luton Town	Derby
	Davies 8', 12', 33', 78', 86'			Stadium: Baseball Ground; Attendance: 24,619

31 March 1975 37	Wolverhampton Wanderers	5–2	Luton Town	Wolverhampton
	Carr 7'; Hibbitt 33' (pen.), 42', 57'; Withe 60'		Seasman 15'; Jimmy Ryan 29'	Stadium: Molineux; Attendance: 22,689

5 April 1975 38	Tottenham Hotspur	2–1	Luton Town	London
	Duncan 19'; Conn 85'		West 26'	Stadium: White Hart Lane; Attendance: 25,796

9 April 1975 39	Luton Town	2–1	Everton	Luton
	Anderson 40', 44'		Latchford 20'	Stadium: Kenilworth Road; Attendance: 13,437

12 April 1975 40	Luton Town	3–0	Leicester City	Luton
	Alston 22'; Weller 36' (o.g.); Husband 77'			Stadium: Kenilworth Road; Attendance: 18,298

19 April 1975 41	Birmingham City	1–4	Luton Town	Birmingham
	Francis 61'		John Ryan 13'; Alston 44', 48'; Husband 75'	Stadium: St Andrew's; Attendance: 28,755

26 April 1975 42	Luton Town	1–1	Manchester City	Luton
	Jimmy Ryan 72'		Tueart 13'	Stadium: Kenilworth Road; Attendance: 20,768

=== League Cup ===
11 September 1974 2nd Round	Luton Town	1–0	Bristol Rovers	Luton
	Alston 36'			Stadium: Kenilworth Road; Attendance: 10,073

8 October 1974 2nd Round	Sheffield United	2–0	Luton Town	Sheffield
	Eddy 14'; Bradford 58'			Stadium: Bramall Lane; Attendance: 14,150

=== FA Cup ===
4 January 1975 3rd Round	Luton Town	0–1	Birmingham City	Luton
			Kendall 47'	Stadium: Kenilworth Road; Attendance: 17,543

== League table ==
Pos	Team	Pld	W	D	L	GF	GA	GAv	Pts	Qualification or relegation
18	Leicester City	42	12	12	18	46	60	0.767	36	
19	Tottenham Hotspur	42	13	8	21	52	63	0.825	34	
20	Luton Town (R)	42	11	11	20	47	65	0.723	33	Relegation to the Second Division
21	Chelsea (R)	42	9	15	18	42	72	0.583	33	Relegation to the Second Division
22	Carlisle United (R)	42	12	5	25	43	59	0.729	29	Relegation to the Second Division

Source: World Football
Rules for classification: 1) Points; 2) Goal average; 3) Goals scored
(R) Relegated

== Player details ==
Last match played on 26 April 1975.
Players arranged in order of starts (in all competitions), with the greater number of substitute appearances taking precedence in case of an equal number of started matches.

Pos.	Name	League		FA Cup		League Cup		Texaco Cup		Total	
Pos.	Name	Apps	Goals	Apps	Goals	Apps	Goals	Apps	Goals	Apps	Goals
MF	(England) Alan West	42	1	1	0	2	0	3	0	48	1
MF	(England) Peter Anderson	40	6	1	0	2	0	3	1	46	7
DF	(England) John Ryan	38	1	1	0	2	0	1	0	42	1
FW	(England) Jimmy Husband	33	3	1	0	2	0	3	2	39	5
MF	(Scotland) Jimmy Ryan	30 (1)	7	1	0	1	0	3	0	35 (1)	7
FW	(England) John Faulkner	34	1	1	0	0	0	0	0	35	1
MF	(England) John Aston	32	5	1	0	0	0	0 (1)	0	33 (1)	5
GK	(England) Keith Barber	26	0	0	0	2	0	0 (1)	0	28 (1)	0
DF	(England) Steve Buckley	24	0	1	0	1	0	0	0	26	0
MF	(England) Gordon Hindson	17	1	0	0	2	0	3	0	23	0
DF	(England) Bobby Thomson	17	0	0	0	1	0	3	0	21	0
FW	(Australia) Adrian Alston	18 (3)	7	0	0	2	1	0	0	20 (3)	8
DF	(England) Paul Futcher	19	0	1	0	0	0	0 (1)	0	20 (1)	0
GK	(England) Graham Horn	16	0	1	0	0	0	3	0	20	0
DF	(England) Don Shanks	15 (1)	1	0	0	2	0	2	0	19 (1)	1
FW	(England) Ron Futcher	16 (1)	7	1	0	0	0	0	0	17 (1)	7
DF	(England) Steve Litt	12	0	0	0	1	0	3	0	16	0
DF	(England) Alan Garner	9	1	0	0	1 (1)	0	3	0	13 (1)	1
FW	(England) Barry Butlin	9	3	0	0	1	0	3	2	13	5
MF	(England) Brian Chambers	6	0	0	0	0	0	0	0	6	0
FW	(England) Peter Spiring	5 (2)	1	0	0	0	0	0	0	5 (2)	1
FW	(England) Rodney Fern	3	0	0	0	0	0	0	0	3	0
MF	(England) John Seasman	1 (1)	1	0	0	0	0	0	0	1 (1)	0
MF	(England) Lil Fuccillo	0 (1)	0	0	0	0	0	0	0	0 (1)	0
MF	(England) Andy King	0 (1)	0	0	0	0	0	0	0	0 (1)	0
FW	(Scotland) Maitland Pollock	0	0	0 (1)	0	0	0	0	0	0 (1)	0
—	own goal	—	1	—	0	—	0	—	0	—	1

== See also ==
- 1974–75 in English football
