= List of Luton Town F.C. managers =

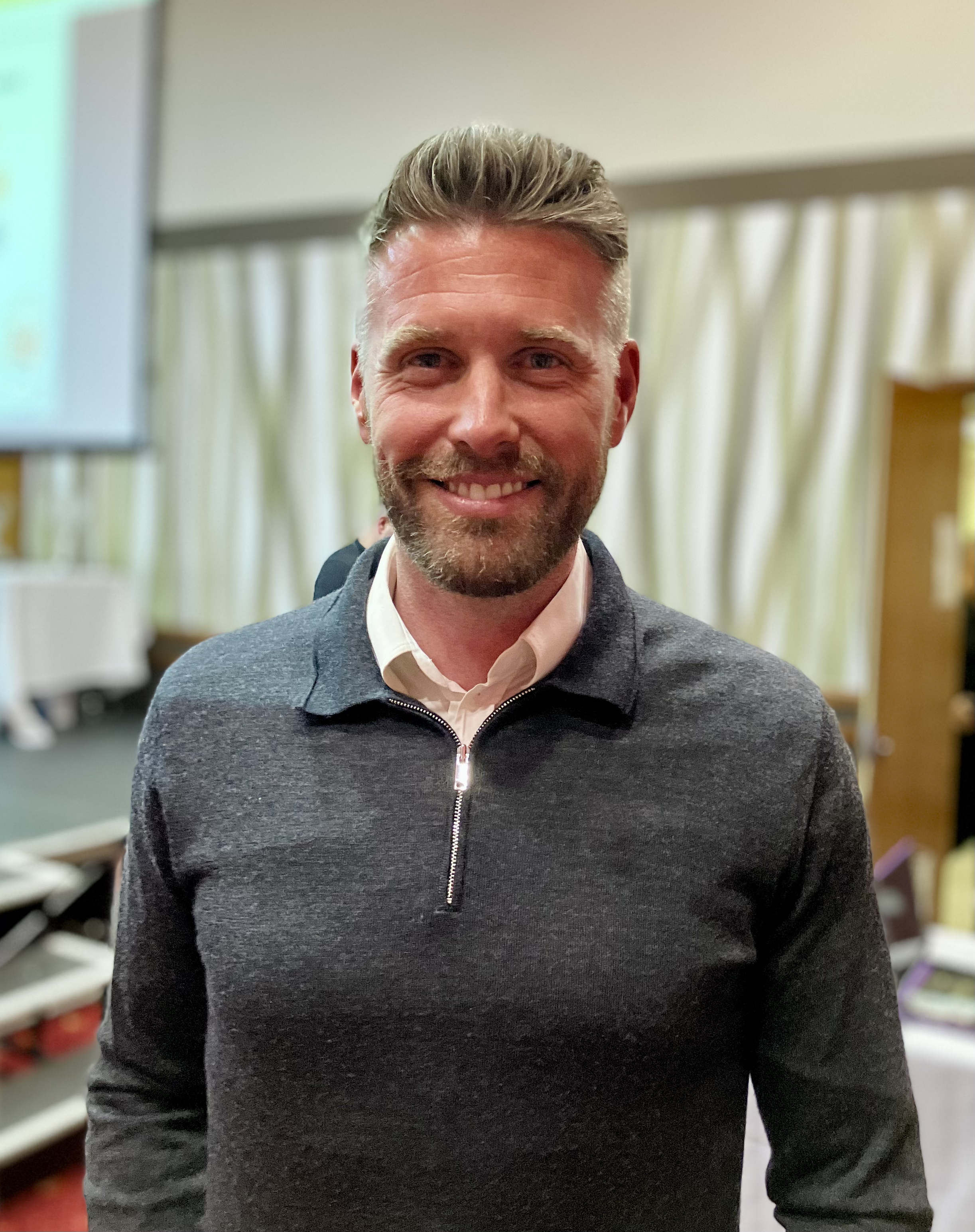
Luton Town were promoted to the Premier League under Rob Edwards in the 2022–23 season.

Luton Town Football Club is an English association football club, based in the town of Luton, Bedfordshire. The club was founded in 1885, and will compete in League One during the 2025–26 season.

The playing staff were originally organised by a trainer, and chosen for matches by a committee made up of directors led by the club's secretary. The club appointed an official manager for the first time in 1925. George Thompson took up the role in February, but left after eight months, "scalded by his experience". Thompson was not replaced until 1927, when former player John McCartney took charge. Harold Wightman worked during the early 1930s to build a team to challenge for promotion, but was sacked early on in the 1935–36 season. Without a manager, the team finished as runners-up in the Third Division South, before topping the table in 1936–37 under Ned Liddle. Dally Duncan was appointed in 1947, and during his 11-year tenure he took Luton into the First Division for the first time. After Duncan was sacked early in the 1958–59 season, the club's board of directors managed the team to the 1959 FA Cup final.

Poor spells under four managers resulted in relegation to the Fourth Division by 1965. Allan Brown became manager in November 1966, and Luton won the division in 1967–68. Brown moved on halfway through the next season, and Alec Stock continued the revival, winning promotion to the Second Division in 1969–70. Luton won another promotion in 1973–74 to return to the top division under Harry Haslam, but Haslam was unable to prevent relegation during the following season. David Pleat became manager in 1978, and built a team that took the 1981–82 Second Division championship. Though Pleat moved on in 1986, success continued—Luton finished seventh during 1986–87, and won the Football League Cup a year later under Ray Harford. Managed by Jimmy Ryan, the team avoided relegation in 1989–90, and repeated that feat during the following season. When Ryan was then sacked in favour of a return for Pleat, Luton were relegated in 1991–92. Pleat left again in 1995, and a five-year spell under Lennie Lawrence then saw Luton drop to the third tier. A disastrous 2000–01 season—in which three managers took the helm at the club—saw Luton fall into the bottom division of the Football League for the first time since 1968.

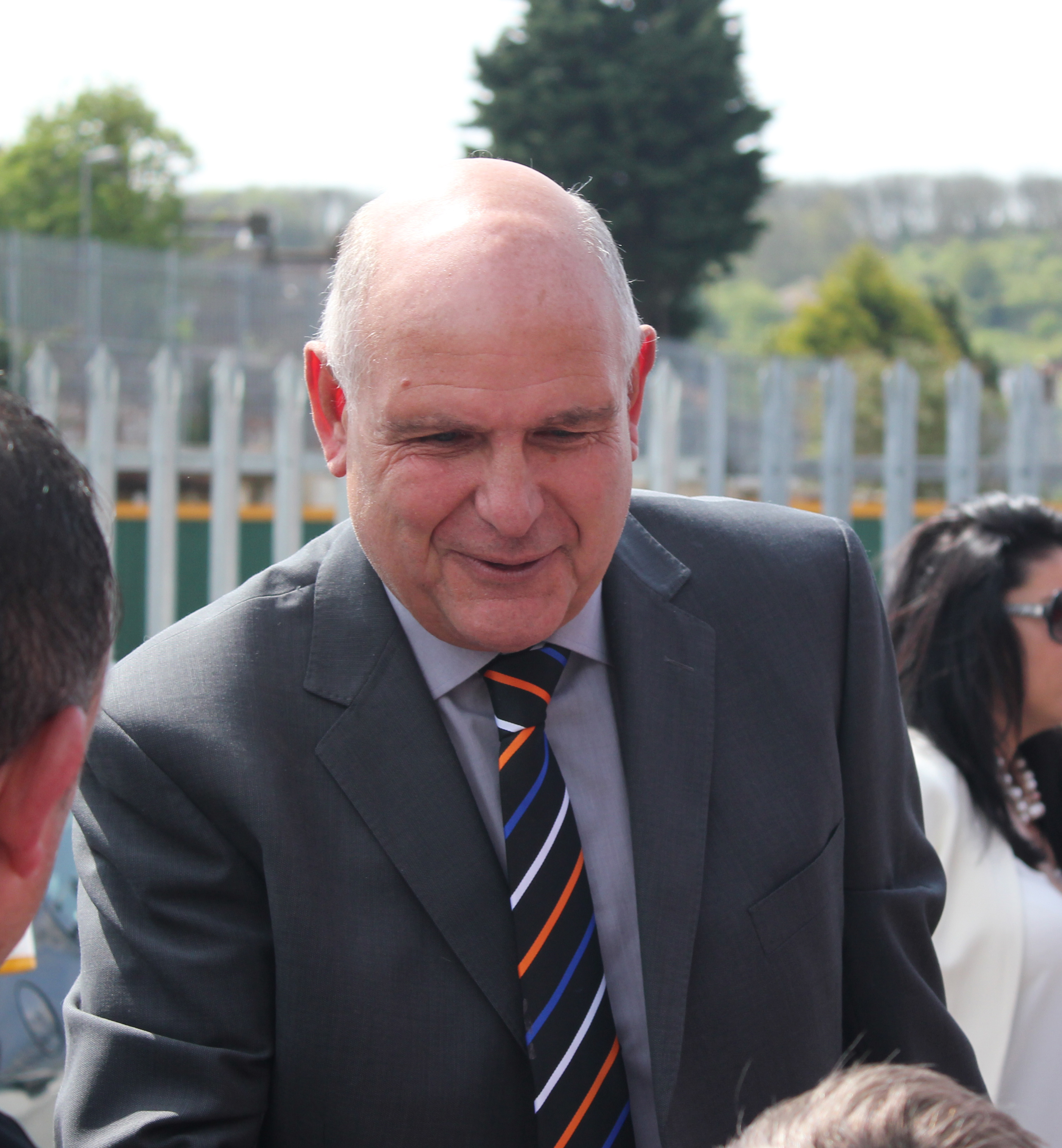
Luton regained their Football League status following promotion to League Two under John Still in the 2013–14 season.

Joe Kinnear took Luton back up at the first time of asking, but was sacked by the club's new owners following a takeover in May 2003. Mike Newell was appointed as manager, and his side became League One champions in 2004–05. Internal troubles at the club started to intensify during the summer of 2006, as the club's chairman was revealed by Newell to be making illegal payments to agents—after writing a scathing letter to the board, Newell was sacked in March 2007. Kevin Blackwell was appointed in his stead, but was also sacked less than a year later on 16 January 2008; former player Mick Harford was made Luton Town's new manager the same day, and he was unable to prevent the club's relegation in 2007–08. After being deducted a total of 30 points by the Football League and The Football Association for 2008–09, Luton were relegated to the Conference Premier; however, the club claimed a Football League Trophy victory during the same season in a 3–2 win over Scunthorpe United in the final. After two months of the 2009–10 season, Harford left the club by mutual consent, to be replaced a month later by Richard Money. Money's assistant, Gary Brabin, replaced him in March 2011, and managed the club until he was sacked a year later. His replacement, Paul Buckle, took charge in April 2012, and was himself replaced in February 2013 by John Still. Still took Luton back into the Football League in his first full season as manager, breaking a number of club records in the process.

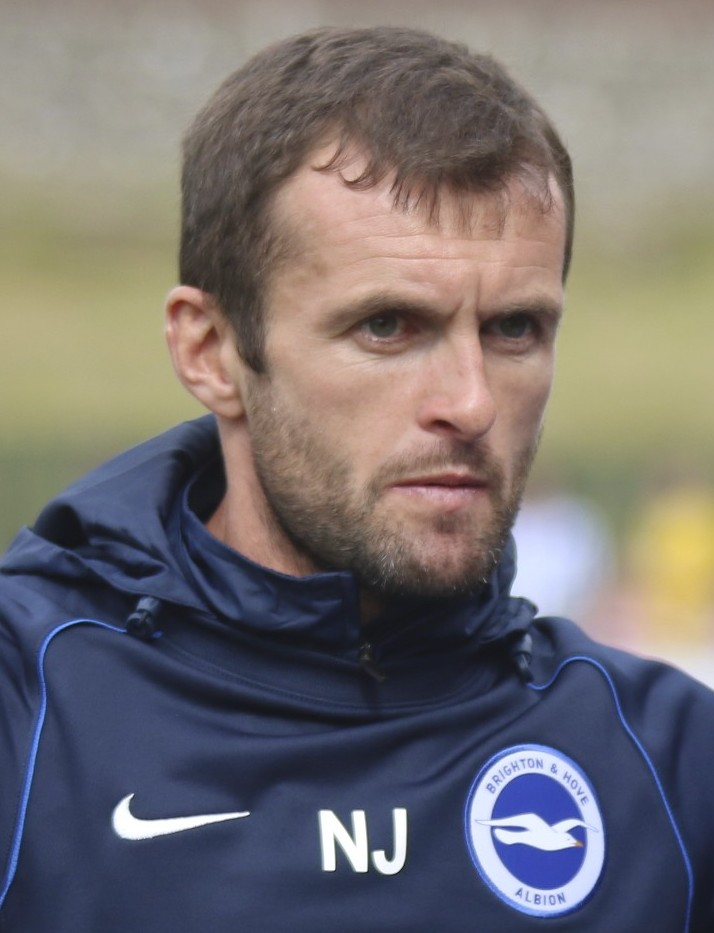
Nathan Jones oversaw Luton's promotion to League One in the 2017–18 season.

Still guided Luton to a comfortable finish in their first season back in League Two, but was sacked by the club in December 2015 following a poor run of form. He was replaced by Nathan Jones in January 2016, who took on his first ever managerial role. Jones led the club to promotion to League One in the 2017–18 season, before departing in January 2019 to join Championship club Stoke City. He left Luton with the highest Football League points per game ratio of any manager in their history. Mick Harford returned as caretaker manager for the remainder of the 2018–19 season, leading Luton to promotion to the Championship. Graeme Jones was appointed as permanent manager in May 2019, though left the club by mutual consent before the end of the 2019–20 season with the club 23rd in the table. Nathan Jones was reappointed in May 2020 and guided Luton to Championship safety on the final day of the season, and led them to 12th place the following season with their highest points total in the second tier since 1981–82. After he led Luton to the play-offs in 2021–22, in which they were beaten 2–1 on aggregate by Huddersfield Town in the semi-final, Jones left in November 2022 with the club ninth in the table to take over at Premier League club Southampton. He was succeeded by Rob Edwards, who led Luton to promotion to the Premier League via the play-offs, with a penalty shoot-out victory over Coventry City in the final, marking the club's return to the first tier after a 31-year absence. Luton spent one season in the Premier League before being relegated back to the Championship. Edwards was sacked in January 2025, with Matt Bloomfield joining the club days later. Luton suffered a second successive relegation at the end of the season, and, after a poor start to League One in the 2025–26 season, Bloomfield was sacked on 6 October 2025. Jack Wilshire joined Luton shortly after on 13 October and in the same season would lead the club to win the Football League Trophy for the second time in the club's history, beating Stockport County 3–1 in the final.

== Managers ==
All first-team matches in national or international competition are counted, except the abandoned 1939–40 Football League season and matches in wartime leagues and cups.Names of caretaker managers are supplied where known, and periods of caretaker-management are highlighted in italics. Win percentage is rounded to one decimal place.
Statistics are complete up to and including the match played on 24 October 2026.

Key

M: Matches played W: Matches won D: Matches drawn L: Matches lost

Name	Nation	From	To	M	W	D	L	Win %	Honours and achievements	Notes
George Thompson	England	16 February 1925	26 October 1925	25	9	7	9	36.0	—	
none	—	26 October 1925	14 September 1927	77	30	22	25	39.0	—	^{[B]}
John McCartney	Scotland	14 September 1927	21 December 1929	151	57	38	56	37.7	—	^{[A]}
George Kay	England	23 December 1929	13 May 1931	71	29	16	26	40.8	—	^{[A]}
Harold Wightman	England	1 June 1931	9 October 1935	198	85	49	64	42.9	—	^{[A]}
none	—	9 October 1935	13 August 1936	41	23	12	6	56.1	Football League Third Division South runners-up, 1935–36	^{[B]}
Ned Liddle	England	13 August 1936	26 February 1938	79	42	11	26	53.2	Football League Third Division South champions, 1936–37	
none	—	26 February 1938	1 June 1938	12	3	5	4	25.0	—	^{[B]}
Neil McBain	Scotland	1 June 1938	5 June 1939	43	22	6	15	51.2	—	
George Martin	Scotland	4 December 1944	24 May 1947	36	18	8	10	50.0	—	^{[C]}
none	—	24 May 1947	13 June 1947	1	1	0	0	100.0	—	^{[B]}
Dally Duncan	Scotland	13 June 1947	16 October 1958	503	192	133	178	38.2	Football League Second Division runners-up, 1954–55	
none	—	16 October 1958	27 April 1959	39	13	10	16	33.3	—	^{[B]}
Syd Owen	England	27 April 1959	16 April 1960	42	10	11	21	23.8	FA Cup runners-up, 1958–59	
none	—	16 April 1960	18 July 1960	3	1	1	1	33.3	—	^{[B]}
Sam Bartram	England	18 July 1960	14 June 1962	95	35	18	42	36.8	—	
Jack Crompton	England	29 June 1962	6 July 1962	0	0	0	0	—	—	
Bill Harvey	England	24 July 1962	21 November 1964	121	37	26	58	30.6	—	
Charlie Watkins	Scotland	21 November 1964	16 February 1965	11	3	1	7	27.3	—	
George Martin	Scotland	16 February 1965	3 November 1966	82	34	16	32	41.5	—	
Allan Brown	Scotland	4 November 1966	17 December 1968	111	56	24	31	50.5	Football League Fourth Division champions, 1967–68	
Alec Stock	England	20 December 1968	27 April 1972	172	71	56	45	41.3	Football League Third Division runners-up, 1969–70	
none	—	27 April 1972	4 May 1972	1	0	1	0	0.0	—	^{[B]}
Harry Haslam	England	4 May 1972	23 January 1978	275	110	69	96	40.0	Football League Second Division runners-up, 1973–74	
David Pleat	England	24 January 1978	16 May 1986	393	158	108	127	40.2	Football League Second Division champions, 1981–82	
John Moore	Scotland	3 June 1986	16 June 1987	47	19	15	13	40.4	Club's best league finish: seventh in the top flight, 1986–87	
Ray Harford	England	16 June 1987	3 January 1990	133	51	34	48	38.3	Football League Cup winners, 1987–88; Full Members Cup runners-up, 1987–88; Football League Cup runners-up, 1988–89	
Terry Mancini	Ireland	3 January 1990	11 January 1990	0	0	0	0	—	—	
Jim Ryan	Scotland	11 January 1990	13 May 1991	63	18	16	29	28.6	—	
David Pleat	England	7 June 1991	11 June 1995	207	55	70	82	26.6	—	
Terry Westley	England	3 July 1995	18 December 1995	28	5	7	16	17.9	—	
Lennie Lawrence	England	21 December 1995	4 July 2000	250	90	66	94	36.0	—	
Ricky Hill	England	10 July 2000	11 November 2000	21	2	8	11	9.5	—	
Lil Fuccillo	England	16 November 2000	8 February 2001	15	4	2	9	26.7	—	
Joe Kinnear	Ireland	8 February 2001	23 May 2003	122	56	28	38	45.9	Football League Third Division runners-up, 2001–02	
Mike Newell	England	23 June 2003	15 March 2007	200	83	49	68	41.5	Football League One champions, 2004–05	
Brian Stein	England	15 March 2007	27 March 2007	1	0	0	1	0.0	—	
Kevin Blackwell	England	27 March 2007	16 January 2008	42	16	9	17	38.1	—	
Mick Harford	England	16 January 2008	1 October 2009	91	25	29	37	27.5	Football League Trophy winners, 2008–09	
Alan Neilson	Wales	1 October 2009	30 October 2009	5	4	1	0	80.0	—	
Richard Money	England	30 October 2009	28 March 2011	83	45	21	17	54.2	Conference Premier runners-up, 2009–10	
Gary Brabin	England	28 March 2011	31 March 2012	62	29	22	11	46.8	Conference Premier play-off finalists, 2010–11	
Alan Neilson	Wales	31 March 2012	8 April 2012	1	0	0	1	0.0	—	
Paul Buckle	England	8 April 2012	19 February 2013	48	26	9	13	54.2	Conference Premier play-off finalists, 2011–12	
Alan Neilson	Wales	19 February 2013	26 February 2013	3	0	1	2	0.0	—	
John Still	England	26 February 2013	17 December 2015	148	69	38	41	46.6	Conference Premier champions, 2013–14	
Andy Awford	England	17 December 2015	6 January 2016	4	1	1	2	25.0	—	
Nathan Jones	Wales	6 January 2016	9 January 2019	170	87	46	37	51.2	EFL League Two runners-up, 2017–18	
Mick Harford	England	10 January 2019	7 May 2019	21	12	6	3	57.1	EFL League One champions, 2018–19	
Graeme Jones	England	7 May 2019	24 April 2020	41	12	5	24	29.3	—	
Mick Harford	England	24 April 2020	28 May 2020	0	0	0	0	—	—	
Nathan Jones	Wales	28 May 2020	10 November 2022	133	54	37	42	40.6	—	
Rob Edwards	Wales	17 November 2022	9 January 2025	103	32	25	46	31.1	EFL Championship play-off winners, 2022–23	
Matt Bloomfield	England	14 January 2025	6 October 2025	33	12	7	14	36.4	—	
Jack Wilshere	England	13 October 2025	Present	58	29	14	15	50.0	Football League Trophy winners, 2025–26	

== Footnotes ==
A. ^{a} ^{b} ^{c} Secretary-manager
B. ^{a} ^{b} ^{c} ^{d} ^{e} ^{f} ^{g} The club was managed by a committee during these times, made up of the club's trainer and directors.
C. George Martin was appointed as coach on 1 August 1939, and promoted to manager on 4 December 1944.
