= 1989–90 Luton Town F.C. season =

English football club season

Luton Town F.C.
1989–90 season
- Manager: Ray Harford
- Stadium: Kenilworth Road
- First Division: 17th
- FA Cup: Third round
- Football League Cup: Third round
- Full Members' Cup: Second round
- Top goalscorer: League: All: Kingsley Black and Iain Dowie (11)

During the 1989–90 English football season, Luton Town F.C. competed in the Football League First Division. They finished 17th in the First Division, only escaping relegation on goal difference. There was a managerial change halfway through the season when Ray Harford was sacked after 2 1/2 years in charge to be succeeded by Jimmy Ryan.

== Squad ==
Note: Flags indicate national team as defined under FIFA eligibility rules; some limited exceptions apply. Players may hold more than one non-FIFA nationality.

| Pos. | Nation | Player |
|---|---|---|
| GK | ENG | Alec Chamberlain |
| GK | ENG | Les Sealey |
| DF | ENG | Tim Breacker |
| DF | ENG | John Dreyer |
| DF | ENG | Richard Harvey |
| DF | ENG | Marvin Johnson |
| DF | ENG | Julian James |
| DF | SCO | Dave Beaumont |
| DF | SCO | Graham Rodger |
| DF | NIR | Mal Donaghy |
| DF | SCO | Darren Salton |
| DF | SCO | Paul Telfer |
| DF | ENG | Tim Allpress |
| MF | ENG | Gary Cobb |
| MF | ENG | Darron McDonough |
| MF | IRL | Mick Kennedy |

| Pos. | Nation | Player |
|---|---|---|
| MF | ENG | David Preece |
| MF | ENG | Steve Williams |
| MF | IRL | Neil Poutch |
| MF | WAL | Ceri Hughes |
| MF | WAL | Mark Pembridge |
| MF | WAL | Jason Rees |
| MF | NIR | Kingsley Black |
| MF | NIR | Danny Wilson |
| FW | ENG | Mick Harford |
| FW | ENG | Sean Farrell |
| FW | WAL | Kurt Nogan |
| FW | NIR | Iain Dowie |
| FW | NIR | Paul Gray |
| FW | DEN | Lars Elstrup |
| FW | RSA | Roy Wegerle |
| FW | ENG | Richard Cooke |

== Results ==
=== First Division ===
| Pos | Team | Pld | W | D | L | GF | GA | GD | Pts | Qualification or relegation |
|---|---|---|---|---|---|---|---|---|---|---|
| 15 | Crystal Palace | 38 | 13 | 9 | 16 | 42 | 66 | −24 | 48 | |
| 16 | Derby County | 38 | 13 | 7 | 18 | 43 | 40 | +3 | 46 | |
| 17 | Luton Town | 38 | 10 | 13 | 15 | 43 | 57 | −14 | 43 | |
| 18 | Sheffield Wednesday (R) | 38 | 11 | 10 | 17 | 35 | 51 | −16 | 43 | Relegation to the Second Division |
| 19 | Charlton Athletic (R) | 38 | 7 | 9 | 22 | 31 | 57 | −26 | 30 | Relegation to the Second Division |

Source: World Football
Rules for classification: 1) Points; 2) Goal difference; 3) Goals scored
(R) Relegated
- 25 November: Southampton 6-3 Luton Town

== Player details ==
Players arranged in alphabetical order by surname.

| Pos. | Name | League | | League Cup | | FA Cup | | Full Members Cup | | Total | |
| Pos. | Name | Apps | Goals | Apps | Goals | Apps | Goals | Apps | Goals | Apps | Goals |
|---|---|---|---|---|---|---|---|---|---|---|---|
| DF | (England) Tim Allpress | 1 | 0 | 0 | 0 | 0 | 0 | 1 | 0 | 2 | 0 |
| DF | (Scotland) Dave Beaumont | 16 (3) | 0 | 3 | 0 | 0 | 0 | 1 | 0 | 20 (3) | 0 |
| MF | (England) Kingsley Black | 36 | 11 | 2 (1) | 0 | 1 | 0 | 0 | 0 | 39 (1) | 11 |
| DF | (England) Tim Breacker | 38 | 1 | 3 | 0 | 1 | 0 | 2 | 0 | 44 | 1 |
| GK | (England) Alec Chamberlain | 38 | 0 | 3 | 0 | 1 | 0 | 2 | 0 | 44 | 0 |
| MF | (England) Richard Cooke | 3 (8) | 1 | 0 | 0 | 0 | 0 | 1 (1) | 0 | 4 (9) | 1 |
| DF | (Northern Ireland) Mal Donaghy | 5 | 0 | 0 | 0 | 0 | 0 | 0 | 0 | 5 | 0 |
| FW | (England) Iain Dowie | 26 (3) | 8 | 0 (1) | 0 | 0 (1) | 0 | 2 | 3 | 28 (5) | 11 |
| DF | (England) John Dreyer | 38 | 2 | 3 | 1 | 1 | 0 | 1 | 0 | 43 | 3 |
| FW | (Denmark) Lars Elstrup | 13 (10) | 4 | 3 | 5 | 0 | 0 | 0 | 0 | 16 (10) | 9 |
| FW | (England) Sean Farrell | 0 (1) | 0 | 0 | 0 | 0 | 0 | 0 | 0 | 0 (1) | 0 |
| FW | (Northern Ireland) Paul Gray | 2 (5) | 1 | 0 | 0 | 0 | 0 | 0 (2) | 1 | 2 (7) | 2 |
| FW | (England) Mick Harford | 1 (3) | 0 | 0 | 0 | 1 | 0 | 0 | 0 | 2 (3) | 0 |
| DF | (England) Richard Harvey | 17 (9) | 0 | 1 | 0 | 1 | 0 | 2 | 0 | 21 (9) | 0 |
| MF | (Wales) Ceri Hughes | 1 | 0 | 0 | 0 | 0 | 0 | 0 | 0 | 1 | 0 |
| DF | (England) Julian James | 19 (1) | 1 | 0 | 0 | 1 | 0 | 1 | 0 | 21 (1) | 1 |
| DF | (England) Marvin Johnson | 7 (5) | 0 | 0 (1) | 0 | 1 | 0 | 1 | 0 | 9 (6) | 0 |
| MF | (Republic of Ireland) Mick Kennedy | 30 (2) | 0 | 2 | 0 | 1 | 0 | 1 | 0 | 34 (2) | 0 |
| MF | (England) Darron McDonough | 13 | 0 | 2 | 0 | 0 | 0 | 0 | 0 | 15 | 0 |
| FW | (Wales) Kurt Nogan | 10 | 2 | 0 | 0 | 0 | 0 | 0 | 0 | 10 | 2 |
| MF | (Republic of Ireland) Neil Poutch | 0 (1) | 0 | 0 | 0 | 0 | 0 | 0 | 0 | 0 (1) | 0 |
| MF | (England) David Preece | 30 (2) | 1 | 3 | 1 | 1 | 0 | 2 | 0 | 35 (2) | 2 |
| MF | (Wales) Jason Rees | 8 (6) | 0 | 0 | 0 | 0 | 0 | 0 | 0 | 8 (6) | 0 |
| DF | (Scotland) Graham Rodger | 2 | 0 | 1 | 0 | 0 | 0 | 0 | 0 | 3 | 0 |
| MF | (Republic of Ireland) Aaron Tighe | 0 | 0 | 0 | 0 | 0 | 0 | 1 (1) | 0 | 1 (1) | 0 |
| FW | (South Africa) Roy Wegerle | 13 (2) | 2 | 3 | 4 | 0 | 0 | 2 | 0 | 18 (2) | 6 |
| DF | (England) Steve Williams | 14 | 1 | 1 | 0 | 0 | 0 | 0 | 0 | 15 | 1 |
| MF | (Northern Ireland) Danny Wilson | 35 | 7 | 3 | 0 | 1 | 1 | 2 | 0 | 41 | 8 |

== See also ==
- List of Luton Town F.C. seasons
- 1989–90 Football League
- 1989–90 FA Cup
