= John Kenyon =

John Kenyon may refer to:

- John Robert Kenyon (1807–1880), British lawyer and academic
- John Samuel Kenyon (1874–1959), American linguist
- John Snyders Kenyon (1843–1902), American politician and Medal of Honor recipient
- John Philipps Kenyon (1927–1996), English historian
- John Kenyon (patron) (1784–1856), English literary patron and philanthropist
- John Kenyon (priest) (1812–1869), Irish Catholic priest and nationalist
- John Kenyon (footballer) (born 1953), English football player
