= George Thompson (footballer, born 1884) =

English footballer and manager

Personal information
- Full name: George Alexander Thompson
- Date of birth: 23 March 1884
- Place of birth: South Shields, England
- Date of death: 1950
- Place of death: South Shields, England
- Position: Winger

Senior career*
Years	Team	Apps	(Gls)
- South Shields Bertram
- South Shields Adelaide
- North Shields Athletic
1906–1908	Sheffield United	40	(4)
1908–1910	Derby County	46	(5)
1910–1911	Newcastle United	0	(0)

Managerial career
- 1925: Luton Town
- * Club domestic league appearances and goals

George Alexander Thompson (23 March 1884 – 1950) was an English footballer and manager who managed Luton Town for eight months during 1925. Turning professional in 1906, he turned out for Sheffield United, Derby County and Newcastle United before moving into management.
