= Eric Probert =

English footballer

Personal information
- Full name: Eric William Probert
- Date of birth: 17 February 1952
- Place of birth: South Kirkby, Yorkshire, England
- Date of death: September 2004 (aged 52)
- Place of death: Pontefract, Yorkshire, England
- Position: Midfielder

Senior career*
Years	Team	Apps	(Gls)
1968–1973	Burnley	67	(11)
1973–1978	Notts County	122	(14)
1978–1980	Darlington	21	(0)
- * Club domestic league appearances and goals

Eric William Probert (17 February 1952 – September 2004) was an English professional footballer who played as a midfielder. He played over 200 matches in the Football League, and scored a total of 25 goals.
