= Eddie Jones (footballer, born 1952) =

English footballer

Personal information
- Date of birth: 17 September 1952 (age 74)
- Place of birth: Finchley, England
- Position: Left back

Senior career*
Years	Team	Apps	(Gls)
1972–1973	Tottenham Hotspur	0	(0)
1973–1976	Millwall	59	(0)
1977–1978	Dartford	3	(0)
1979–1981	Cray Wanderers	91	(31)
Total		153	(31)
- * Club domestic league appearances and goals

Edward Jones (born 17 September 1952) is an English former professional footballer who played in the Football League, as a defender.

In July 1979, Jones joined Cray Wanderers, staying for two successful seasons during which Cray became champions of the Kent League.
