= Ned Liddle =

English football player, manager and scout

Personal information
- Full name: Edward Liddle
- Date of birth: 27 May 1878
- Place of birth: Sunderland, England
- Date of death: 22 November 1968 (aged 90)
- Place of death: Redbridge, London, England
- Height: 6 ft 0 in (1.83 m)
- Position: Wing half

Youth career
- 1901–1903: East End Black Watch

Senior career*
Years	Team	Apps	(Gls)
1903	Whitburn (Durham)	?	(?)
1904	Seaham White Star	?	(?)
1904–1905	Sunderland	0	(0)
1905–1906	Southampton	1	(0)
1906–1907	Gainsborough Trinity	9	(0)
1907–1913	Clapton Orient	193	(3)
1913–1914	Southend United	?	(?)
1914–1920	Arsenal	2	(0)

Managerial career
- 1919–1920: Southend United
- 1920–1924: Queens Park Rangers
- 1929–1931: Fulham
- 1936–1938: Luton Town
- * Club domestic league appearances and goals

Edward Liddle (27 May 1878 – 22 November 1968) (sometimes Liddell) was an English football player, manager and scout. He played in the Football League for Gainsborough Trinity, Clapton Orient, with whom he spent the majority of his playing career, and Arsenal, and spent time with a number of other clubs at varying levels. Liddle went on to manage four teams – Southend United, Queens Park Rangers, Fulham and Luton Town – in league football.

== Playing career ==
Liddle was born in Sunderland and during his playing career, he played as a wing half for a number of clubs. He started off with East End Black Watch in 1901 before moving to Whitburn (Durham) in 1903 and then Seaham White Star. After this he went on to play for Sunderland, Southampton, Gainsborough Trinity and Southend. In between he had his most successful spell as a player, at Clapton Orient, for whom he made over 200 appearances.

He ended his league career at Arsenal, joining the club in 1914. He played two league games in 1914–15, his debut coming against Hull City on 2 April 1915; he continued to play for the club during the First World War and was a member of Arsenal's reserve team until his retirement in the 1920 close season.

== Managerial career ==
In 1920 he was appointed manager of Southend and, although his tenure only lasted a year, he oversaw their rise into the football league. In 1920 he moved to Queens Park Rangers where he was manager for four years before returning to Southend as assistant manager. His next role was as chief scout for Fulham and he subsequently went on to become their third manager in five years when he took up the post in 1929, taking over from the same person as he had at Southend, Joe Bradshaw. He finished his managerial career at Luton Town between 1936 and 1938. He continued to scout for other clubs, including Brentford, up until his death at the age of 90.
