= Neil Poutch =

Irish footballer

Personal information
- Date of birth: 27 November 1969 (age 56)
- Place of birth: Dublin, Ireland
- Position: Midfielder

Youth career
- 1978–1985: Stella Maris

Senior career*
Years	Team	Apps	(Gls)
1985–1990	Luton Town	1	(0)
1990–1991	Shamrock Rovers	29	(1)
1991–1992	→ Athlone Town (loan)	13	(1)
1992–1994	Drogheda United	17	(0)
Total		60	(2)

International career
1989–1990	Republic of Ireland U21	8	(0)
1987–1988	Republic of Ireland U19	?	(2)
1985	Republic of Ireland U17	1	(0)
- * Club domestic league appearances and goals

Neil Poutch (born 27 November 1969) is an Irish former footballer. A midfielder, Poutch played in the English First Division for Luton Town and in the League of Ireland for Shamrock Rovers, Athlone Town and Drogheda United. Internationally, he represented Ireland at levels up to under-21.

== Life and career ==
Poutch played for St Kevins College as they reached the Leinster Senior Schools Final in 1985. He represented his country at schoolboy level during this time. He was also capped for the Republic of Ireland national football team in a 1986 UEFA European Under-16 Football Championship qualifier against Norway in October 1985. He then stepped up to play for the Republic of Ireland national under-19 football team and scored against Sweden at Dalymount Park in October 1987. He also scored against Finland in the final qualifier in May 1988.

In the 1989–90 Football League season, Poutch made one appearance for Luton Town, at Villa Park on 10 March 1990, as they went on to finish 17th in the First Division.

Poutch came home to sign for Shamrock Rovers in August 1990. He made his debut in a pre-season friendly against Blackburn Rovers and then on 19 August he made his competitive debut against Home Farm in a FAI League Cup tie. He came on as a substitute for the League of Ireland U21 side that drew with the Australian Olympic XI 2–2 at Dalymount Park on 24 August, and made his League of Ireland debut on 2 September against Athlone Town. Four weeks later Poutch played in Rovers' first game at the RDS Arena. He scored his first league goal at Waterford on St Patrick's Day 1991. He played his last game for the club in the 1991 FAI Cup Final at Lansdowne Road. He made a total of 42 appearances for The Hoops.

Poutch was then loaned to Athlone in November 1991 for the remainder of the 1990–91 League of Ireland Premier Division season, making his debut at Terryland Park on 1 December. He scored his only goal for the Midlanders at the Brandywell Stadium on 23 February 1992.

The following season he moved to Drogheda United, making his debut on the opening day of the 1992–93 League of Ireland Premier Division season at Shamrock Rovers.

Poutch was a versatile player playing as a striker for his national team, then as a midfielder and full back in the League of Ireland.

His brother Joey had a spell at Bohemians in the 1980s where he won the 1985 Leinster Senior Cup.

== Sources ==
- Paul Doolan; Robert Goggins. The Hoops. ISBN 0-7171-2121-6.
- Shamrock Rovers programme 4 November 1990
