= John Waddington (English footballer) =

English footballer (born 1952)

Personal information
- Full name: John Waddington
- Date of birth: 16 February 1952 (age 74)
- Place of birth: Darwen, England
- Height: 5 ft 11 in (1.80 m)
- Position: Centre-back

Senior career*
Years	Team	Apps	(Gls)
1970–1973	Liverpool	0	(0)
1973–1979	Blackburn Rovers	148	(18)
1977	Vancouver Whitecaps	6	(0)
1979–1980	Bury	47	(0)
- Great Harwood
Total		201	(18)
- * Club domestic league appearances and goals

John Waddington (born 16 February 1952) is an English former professional footballer who played as a centre-back. He scored 20 goals in 158 matches in all competitions for Blackburn Rovers over a six-year spell with the club in the 1970s.

Waddington was born in Darwen on 16 February 1952. After attending St Mary's College he started his senior career with Liverpool in 1970 but was released by the club after a bout of glandular fever, having failed to appear for their first team, and joined Blackburn Rovers in August 1973. He played 148 times for Blackburn in the league, scoring 18 goals. He was part of the Blackburn side that won the 1974–75 Football League Third Division.

He played in the North American Soccer League for Vancouver Whitecaps in summer 1977 and made 6 appearances.

After leaving Blackburn in summer 1979, he joined Bury, and later had a spell with non-League side Great Harwood. He operated a number of greetings card and stationery shops following his retirement as a player.

Waddington started his career as a centre forward but played primarily as a centre back, though he was noted for his versatility.

== Honours ==
Blackburn Rovers

- Football League Third Division: 1974–75
