= Brian Johnson (footballer, born 1955) =

English footballer, born 1955

Personal information
- Date of birth: 21 October 1955 (age 71)
- Place of birth: Isleworth, England
- Position: Winger

Senior career*
Years	Team	Apps	(Gls)
1973–1982	Plymouth Argyle	197	(40)
1978–1979	→ Torquay United (loan)	5	(2)
1981–1982	→ Torquay United (loan)	2	(0)
Total		204	(42)
- * Club domestic league appearances and goals

Brian Johnson (born 21 October 1955) is an English retired footballer who played as a winger. He made 197 appearances in the Football League for Plymouth Argyle, scoring 40 goals, and a further seven while on loan at Torquay United.

He began his career as an apprentice with Plymouth Argyle before making his first team debut in August 1973 at the age of 17. A key member of the side that won promotion to the Second Division in 1975, alongside the strike-duo of Paul Mariner and Billy Rafferty, he was considered to be a reliable and consistent performer throughout his stay with the Pilgrims. During a reserve team game in 1981, Johnson was knocked unconscious in a collision with teammate Neil Hards. He suffered a fractured cheekbone and damage to both eyes, which required surgery and his jawbone to be wired up. He resumed training four weeks later, but during his second loan stint with Torquay United he experienced severe pain when heading the ball. Rather than risk permanent blindness, Johnson retired at the age of 26.

Johnson made 231 appearances in all competitions for Plymouth Argyle between 1973 and 1981, scoring 43 goals. During his two loan stints with Torquay United, Johnson scored two goals in seven appearances.
