= Paul Cheesley =

English footballer

Personal information
- Full name: Paul Martyn Cheesley
- Date of birth: 20 October 1953 (age 73)
- Place of birth: Bristol, England
- Position: Forward

Senior career*
Years	Team	Apps	(Gls)
1971—1973	Norwich City	24	(1)
1973—1976	Bristol City	61	(20)
Total		85	(21)
- * Club domestic league appearances and goals

Paul Martyn Cheesley (born 20 October 1953 in Bristol) is an English former professional footballer.

== Career ==
A striker, Cheesley began his career with Norwich City, for whom he made his debut as a substitute on 17 November 1971 against Chelsea in a League Cup tie at Carrow Road. His league debut did not come until 2 December 1972, a game which his side lost 2–0 at home to Manchester United.

Cheesley went on to make 24 appearances for Norwich, scoring one goal on 15 December 1973 in a 1–1 draw against Liverpool at Carrow Road.

=== Bristol City ===
In December 1973, as Norwich fought to avoid relegation, Cheesley was sold to Bristol City for a fee of £30,000. Initially, Cheesley struggled at the club, but during City's promotion season of 1975–76 he formed a formidable strike partnership with Tom Ritchie which saw them score a combined total of 33 goals, with Cheesley scoring 15. The opening fixture of the season back in the First Division was away to Arsenal at Highbury. City won 1–0 with Cheesley scoring the only goal.

Cheesley had already been selected to play for England Under 23s to play Hungary, but as the game coincided with a crucial promotion clash against rivals Sunderland, he had turned down the opportunity. Despite that, England boss Don Revie was known to be a fan, and his brave approach, speed and two-footed skill suited England's style. With Cheesley turning in another eye-catching performance at the highest level, many believed it was only a matter of time before he received a full international call-up.

=== Injury ===
Just three days after the victory at Arsenal, City were playing again, at home to Stoke City. A cross came into the box and Cheesley rose to challenge Stoke goalkeeper Peter Shilton for the ball, getting there first and heading over. Cheesley landed awkwardly, ripping his cartilage, tearing ligaments and chipping a bone in his knee. Despite an attempted comeback in a home match against Birmingham City later that season he was forced to retire from League football.

He went on to have spells with non-league clubs, including Yeovil Town. Following his retirement he became the landlord of The Knowle Hotel in Bristol.
