= John Kenyon (footballer) =

English association football player

Personal information
- Full name: John Francis Kenyon
- Date of birth: 2 December 1953 (age 72)
- Place of birth: Blackburn, England
- Height: 5 ft 10 in (1.78 m)
- Position: Forward

Youth career
- 1964-1969: Witton Park High School

Senior career*
| Years | Team | Apps | (Gls) |
| 1971-1972 | Great Harwood Town | 47 | (36) |
| 1972–1976 | Blackburn Rovers | 46 | (7) |
| 1976–1977 | Wigan Athletic | 13 | (2) |
| 1977-1978 | Runcorn | | |
- * Club domestic league appearances and goals

John Francis Kenyon (born 2 December 1953) is an English former footballer who played for Blackburn Rovers in the early 1970s as a forward.

== Career ==
John Francis Kenyon, a talented forward known for his speed and eye for goal. In 1970, Kenyon began his football career with Great Harwood Town. While at Great Harwood, Kenyon became one of the stars of the club which generated interest from Arsenal, Crystal Palace and Blackburn Rovers.

At age 18, Kenyon signed with the Rovers under coach Ken Furphy. In 1975, Kenyon's goal against Brighton & Hove Albion gave the Rovers the Third Division championship in 1975. Kenyon spent some time with Liverpool F.C. scoring a hat trick on his debut before returning to Blackburn Rovers.

After disagreements with manager Jim Smith, Kenyon joined Wigan Athletic, scoring two goals for the club in 13 Northern Premier League appearances. In 1977, he moved again to Runcorn, where he became another one of the fans favoured players supporting the team through its FA Cup qualifying campaign.
