= Barry Butlin =

English footballer

Personal information
- Full name: Barry Desmond Butlin
- Date of birth: 9 November 1949 (age 76)
- Place of birth: Rosliston, England
- Height: 5 ft 11 1/2 in (1.82 m)
- Position: Forward

Youth career
- Derby County

Senior career*
Years	Team	Apps	(Gls)
1967–1972	Derby County	4	(0)
1968–1969	→ Notts County (loan)	20	(8)
1969–1970	→ Notts County (loan)	10	(5)
1972–1974	Luton Town	57	(24)
1974–1977	Nottingham Forest	74	(17)
1975	→ Brighton & Hove Albion (loan)	5	(2)
1976	→ Reading (loan)	5	(1)
1977–1979	Peterborough United	64	(12)
1979–1981	Sheffield United	53	(12)
- * Club domestic league appearances and goals

Barry Desmond Butlin (born 9 November 1949) is an English former footballer who played for Notts County, Luton Town and Nottingham Forest, Peterborough United and Sheffield United, among others, between the late 1960s and the early 1980s.

== Playing career ==
Butlin started out with his local side, Derby County, in 1967. He remained with the club until 1972, spending two successful loan spells at Notts County; he then signed for Luton Town. After two years with Luton he signed for Nottingham Forest, then after three years and two spells out on loan he signed for Peterborough United. He spent two years with Peterborough before signing for Sheffield United. After two seasons with the Blades, he retired.
