= Steve Buckley (footballer) =

English footballer

Personal information
- Full name: Steven Buckley
- Date of birth: 16 October 1953 (age 73)
- Place of birth: Eastwood, Nottinghamshire, England
- Height: 5 ft 11 in (1.80 m)
- Position: Defender

Youth career
- Nottingham Forest

Senior career*
Years	Team	Apps	(Gls)
- Borrowash Victoria
–1974	Burton Albion		
1974–1978	Luton Town	123	(9)
1978–1986	Derby County	323	(21)
1986–1988	Lincoln City	36	(2)
1988–1990	Boston United	56	(0)
- * Club domestic league appearances and goals as of 21:13, 5 May 2007 (UTC)

Steve Buckley (born 16 October 1953) is an English former footballer. His brother Alan Buckley and nephew Adam Buckley also played professionally.

In 1974, he was signed by Luton Town where he spent four seasons before moving to Derby County. At Derby he was twice voted player-of-the-season, winning the award for the 1979-1980 and 1981–1982 seasons.

Buckley joined Lincoln City for the 1986–87 season and he made a total of 72 appearances for them in two seasons. After his time at Lincoln he moved on to Boston United.

Throughout his career, he has scored 32 goals in 532 appearances.
