= Ricky Hill =

English footballer and manager

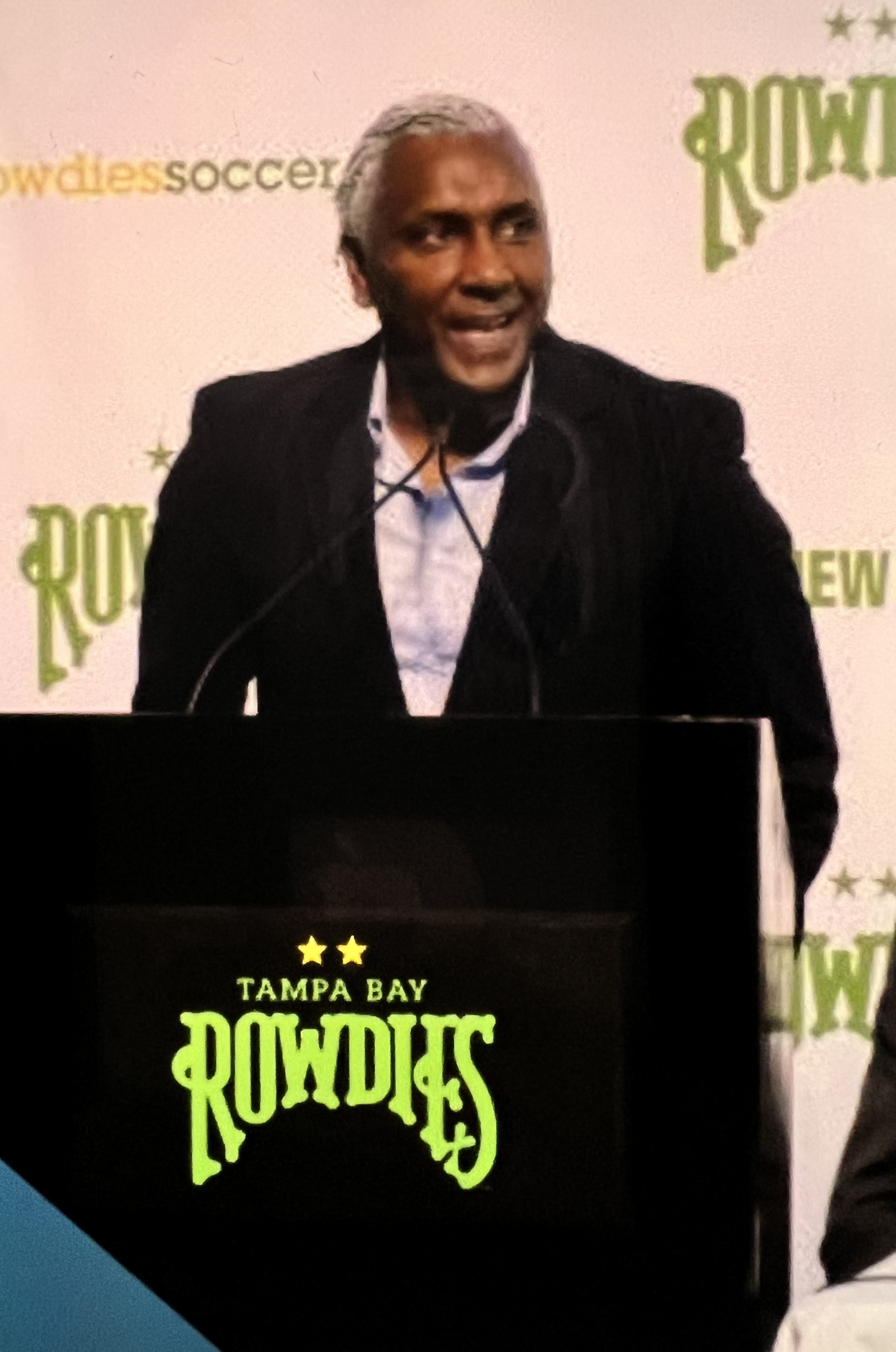
- Hill in 2012

Personal information
- Full name: Ricky Anthony Hill
- Date of birth: 5 March 1959 (age 67)
- Place of birth: Hammersmith, London, England
- Height: 5 ft 11 in (1.80 m)
- Position: Midfielder

Senior career*
Years	Team	Apps	(Gls)
1976–1989	Luton Town	506	(54)
1989–1990	Le Havre	20	(1)
1990–1991	Leicester City	16	(1)
1992	Tampa Bay Rowdies		
1993–1994	Chertsey Town		
1994–1995	Cocoa Expos		

International career
1977	England Youth	2	(0)
1982–1986	England	3	(0)

Managerial career
- 1992: Tampa Bay Rowdies
- 1994–1995: Cocoa Expos
- 2000: Luton Town
- 2003–2005: San Juan Jabloteh
- 2011–2014: Tampa Bay Rowdies
- 2022: Montego Bay United
- 2023: Turks and Caicos Islands
- * Club domestic league appearances and goals

Ricky Hill (born 5 March 1959) is an English professional football coach and a former player who most recently was the manager of the Turks and Caicos Islands national team.

Hill spent most of his playing career at Luton Town for 14 years, while representing England at Senior, U21 and U18 International levels. He was the fourth Black player to play for England's Senior National team and the first British South Asian to represent England at the Senior level.

Hill began his managerial career as a player-coach with the Tampa Bay Rowdies in 1992 and in that season saw the Rowdies appear in both the League Championship final and the Professional Cup final, in addition to Hill also being awarded 'Coach of the Year' amongst other notable player accolades such as Best Passer and All-Star First Team. Spanning 25 years managing various professional clubs across the US, UK, and the Caribbean, Hill made 4 US championship appearances at the professional level, reinforcing his standing as one of the most successful Black coaches in the history of US professional soccer.

Most recently, Hill authored Love of the Game – Ricky Hill: The Man Who Brought the Rooney Rule to the UK which was nominated as a finalist for the 2022 Sports Books Awards in association with The Sunday Times (UK).

== Early life ==
Ricky Hill was born on 5 March 1959 of mixed ancestry. While Hill's mother is Jamaican, his father's family is originally from the city of Lucknow in India. His paternal great-grandparents moved to Jamaica from India shortly after the turn of the 20th century. Hill's father Joseph, one of 11 children, eventually moved to London where he married Hill's mother Doris, a Jamaican whom Joseph had previously attended school alongside in Jamaica.

Hill grew up in the London Borough of Brent, in Cricklewood - not far from Wembley Stadium. A talented footballer in his early years, Hill attended Anson Road Primary and John Kelly Boys School (now known as the Crest Boys Academy) in Neasden. Whilst at John Kelly, Hill was a teammate of former Arsenal and Brighton Hove Albion player Steve Gatting.

At 15, Hill signed schoolboy forms with Luton Town in 1974 after being scouted playing for John Kelly Boys at a game in Hitchin where Luton coaches Roy McCrohan, David Pleat, and Danny Bergara were in attendance.

== Club career ==
=== Luton Town ===
Ricky Hill joined Luton Town in 1975, and made 506 league and cup appearances, scoring 54 goals in the process. At 17, one month after signing professional terms, Hill came on as a substitute in a Second Division game where he scored a goal and made a goal assist in twenty-two minutes in a 3–1 victory over Bristol Rovers.

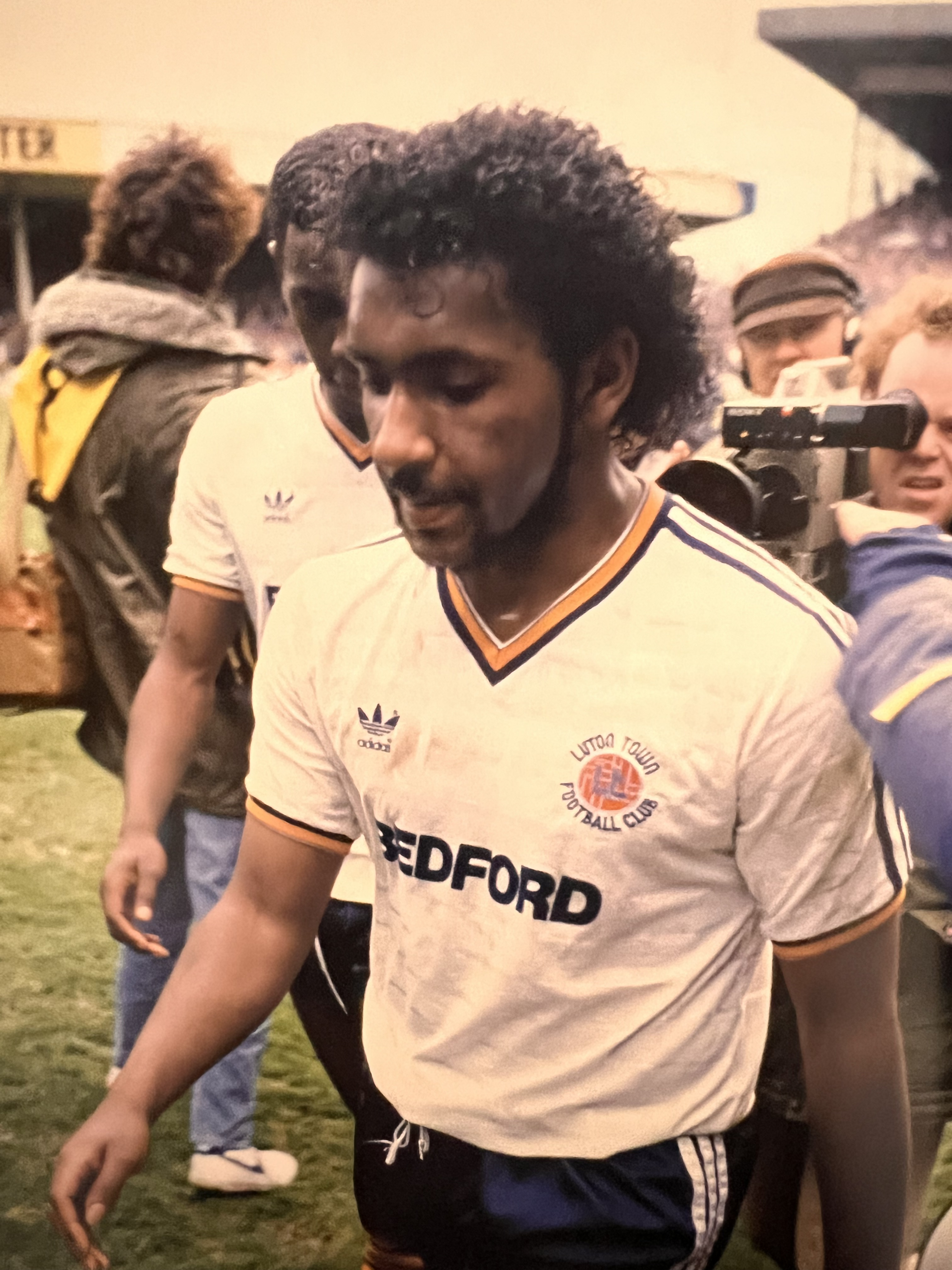
Ricky Hill (1985)

Hill spent 14 years at Luton and played a pivotal role in the club's promotion to the First Division in 1981–82 as Second Division champions, where he won back-to-back 'Player of the Year' awards (1980–1982). Hill was a part of the 1988 League Cup final-winning team that won their first – and only to date – major trophy as they beat Arsenal 3–2 at Wembley Stadium in front of 98,000 fans. They returned to the final again in 1989, only this time to experience defeat to Brian Clough's Nottingham Forest, 3–1.

=== Le Havre ===
In 1989, Hill moved on a free transfer to Le Havre in the French Division 2, where he was recommended to the club by Gerard Houllier. Whilst at Le Havre, Hill played under head coach Pierre Mankowski who went on to become assistant manager to Raymond Domenech with the France national team. Hill credits his time at Le Havre for providing him advanced insight into sports science and youth development of which the club is renowned for.

=== Leicester City ===
In 1990, Hill transferred to Leicester City, rejoining David Pleat for a brief spell who had been his manager at Luton Town previously.

=== Tampa Bay Rowdies ===
In 1991, Hill moved abroad to be player-coach with the Tampa Bay Rowdies in the US.

=== Chertsey Town ===
In 1993, Hill played for Chertsey Town with former professionals including Kenny Sansom, Francis Joseph and Terry Rowe.

=== Cocoa Expos ===
In 1994, Hill moved back to the US to be the technical director and player-coach with the Cocoa Expos.

== International career ==
Hill represented England at U18, U21, and Senior International levels, making his debut under Sir Bobby Robson, coming on as a substitute in the 1982 European Championship qualifier against Denmark in Copenhagen which resulted in a 2–2 draw. The following month Hill made his full starting debut against West Germany at Wembley in a 1–2 defeat. Hill missed out on the 1983 Australia tour due to an injury that required surgery. While being selected to the provisional 26-man squad for the 1986 World Cup Finals in Mexico, Hill was placed on standby after the squad was reduced to a 22-man traveling party.

Hill was the fourth Black player to play for England's senior National team and the first British South Asian to represent England at the senior level. He was capped three times in total for England, with his last appearance being against Egypt on 29 January 1986.

== Coaching career ==
=== Tampa Bay Rowdies ===
In 1992, Hill was introduced to Rodney Marsh, then CEO of the Tampa Bay Rowdies, who were part of the American Professional Soccer League (APSL), the only professional soccer league in the US at the time. The Tampa Bay Rowdies afforded Hill's first opportunity in coaching where Marsh appointed Hill as Player/Coach six weeks after Hill's arrival in the US. That season saw the Rowdies appear in both the League Championship final and the Professional Cup final, in addition to Hill also being awarded 'Coach of the Year' amongst other notable player accolades such as Best Passer, All-Star First Team, Second Best Technical Player as voted by press correspondents.

=== Cocoa Expos ===
Hill returned to the UK briefly before once again heading back to the US in 1994 as the Technical Director/Player Coach of the Cocoa Expos organization in the United States Interregional Soccer League (USISL) and as an Assistant Coach at the Florida Institute of Technology (FIT) from 1994 to 1996. During his time with the Cocoa Expos, the franchise won the Southern Regional title before losing to the Richmond Kickers in the USISL Championship finals. For the 1995 season, the Cocoa Expos held esteemed records of scoring the most goals and conceding the least goals across all USISL professional teams.

=== Sheffield Wednesday ===
David Pleat was now managing Premiership club Sheffield Wednesday and headhunted Hill with an offer to join their organization. Despite having experienced another successful period in the US, Hill took up the post in 1996 with the remit of coaching Sheffield Wednesdays' young apprentices (16–19 years old), preparing them for their next steps towards becoming professional players. Hill and Charlie Williamson had great success in the elevation of 16 out of 18 players being granted professional contracts over a two-year period. Players from that cohort who went on to have lengthy professional careers include Steven Haslam (Sheffield Wednesday), Leigh Bromby (Sheffield Wednesday, Sheffield United, Leeds, Watford, Huddersfield Town), Alan Quinn (Sheffield Wednesday, Sheffield United, Ipswich Town), Derek Geary (Sheffield Wednesday, Sheffield United), Kevin Nicholson (Sheffield Wednesday, Notts County, Torquay United), Peter Holmes (Luton Town, Chesterfield, Rotherham United), and Junior Agogo (Sheffield Wednesday, Nottingham Forest, Bristol Rovers, San Jose Earthquakes, Colorado Rapids). In 1999 the U19 side finished runner-up in the Premiership Academy Cup, losing 1–0 after extra time to the West Ham FA Youth Cup winning side that included future England internationals Joe Cole, Michael Carrick, and a host of future premiership and league players.

Whilst at Sheffield Wednesday, Hill collaborated in 1998 with the American MLS Project-40 program (now known as Generation Adidas), an elite National soccer development program for young MLS players; Project-40 players such as Ubsusuko Abukusumo (Columbus Crew) and Judah Crooks (DC United) were then invited back to Sheffield Wednesday for an extensive training period under Hill. Project-40 raised Hill's visibility to DC United where he was downselected as one of two finalist candidates for the DC United Head Coaching position, a role to be vacated by Bruce Arena who was moving on to become the USA National Team Head Coach.

=== Tottenham Hotspur ===
In 1999, Tottenham Hotspur of the English Premier League recruited Hill to join Tottenham as Head Coach while leading player development in the Academy U16-17 setup. While at Tottenham, Hill coached a talented cohort of young players such as Ledley King, Peter Crouch, Luke Young, Johnnie Jackson, Stephen Kelly, Dean Marney – all of whom went on to have notable professional careers, and in some cases represented their countries of birth at senior international levels.

=== Luton Town ===
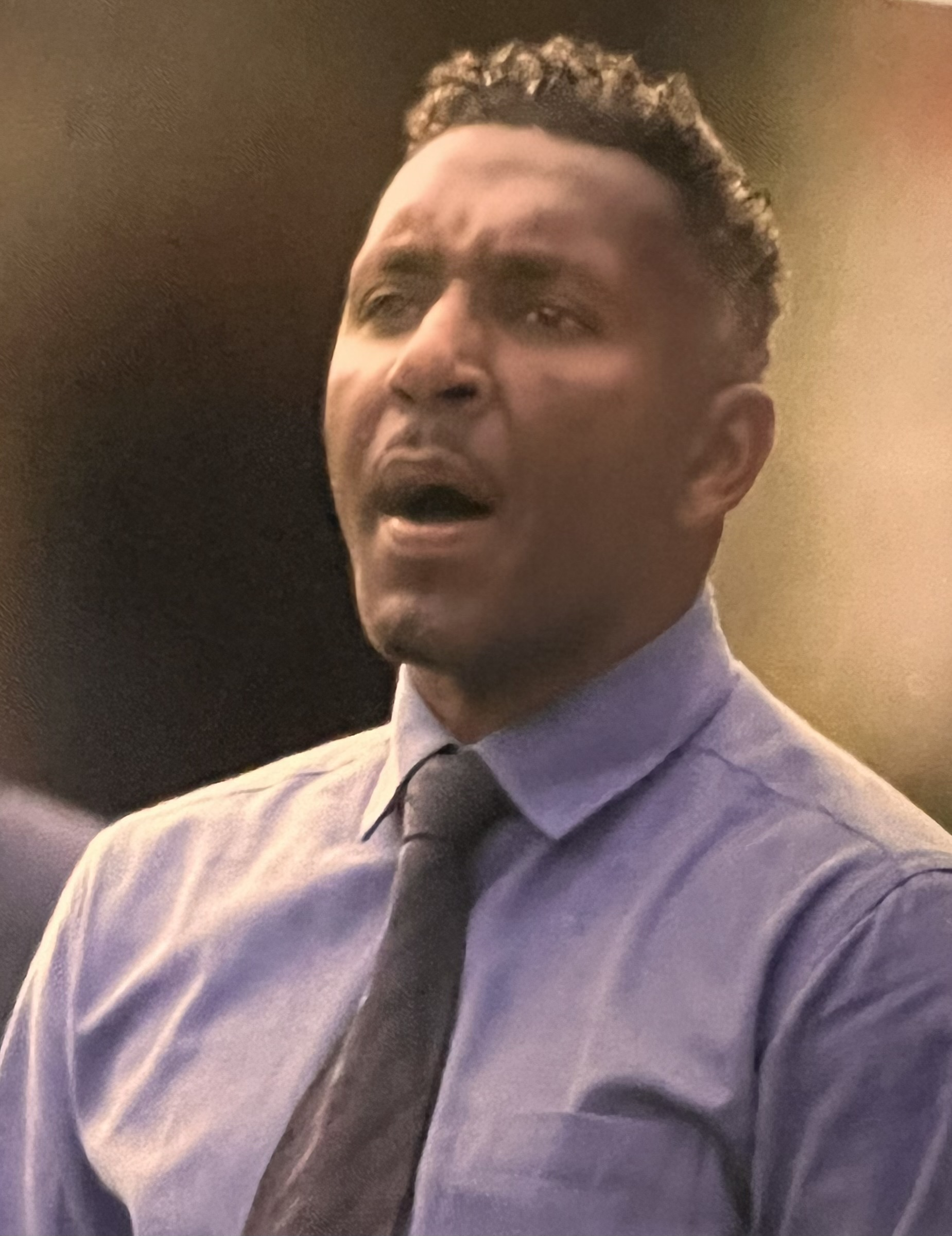
Ricky Hill (2000)

In 2000 Luton Town, then of the English Football League One (EFL), approached Hill to be Manager, which he accepted having spent 14 years there as a player. Unfortunately, Hill's post ended after four months due to circumstances beyond his control where the club had financial challenges over the prior four years, was recently out of administration, and held a first team roster of 15 youth players where ~80% of the first team was released at the end of the season.

=== San Juan Jabloteh ===
San Juan Jabloteh of the Trinidad and Tobago Professional League was Hill's next coaching opportunity, after taking over from former England and club teammate Terry Fenwick. From 2003 to 2004 at San Juan Jabloteh as the Technical Director/Head Coach, Hill experienced unprecedented success with the club winning four out of the five competitions entered. This includes the CFU competition which recognizes the winning team as the best professional club across the Caribbean with qualification to the CONCACAF Champions League for the winners. After making it to the quarterfinals of the CONCACAF Champions League for the only time in the club's history, San Juan Jabloteh became the first Caribbean club side to beat the Major League Soccer (MLS) Champions when defeating the Chicago Fire 5–2 in Port of Spain, Trinidad. San Juan's CFU Championship is the first and only time the club has won this prestigious trophy, where Hill was again awarded the 'Coach of the Year'. During this successful run, San Juan Jabloteh provided the Trinidad and Tobago National team with 13 players who played during their only ever qualification for the World Cup Finals in Germany in 2006.

=== Return to Tampa Bay Rowdies ===
Hill returned to the US in January 2011 to coach the Tampa Bay Rowdies for a second time, arguably the most recognized professional American club outside of the MLS. The Rowdies were now playing in the revamped North American Soccer League (NASL) after a league long term hiatus in the 80s. Hill initially joined the organization as Head Coach but also added the Technical Director role to his remit soon thereafter. In 2012 the Rowdies were crowned the NASL Champions defeating Minnesota Stars in the final. This championship was the first for the club in 27 years, where Hill received another 'Coach of the Year' award. The following season in Open Cup competition, the Rowdies defeated the Seattle Sounders (MLS) 1–0 in the third round where the Sounders were cup finalists for five consecutive years prior; the Rowdies beat the Sounders despite losing caliber players like Luke Mulholland, Fafa Picault, and Jeff Attinella to the MLS at the end of the 2012 Championship season. During Hill's four-year tenure, the club was awarded three Fair Play awards out of a possible four, demonstrating the disciplined environment that Hill created throughout that period.

Hill's contract with the Tampa Bay Rowdies ended in 2016, and he has since been involved in several sports industry and player development programs across the US, England, and Jamaica. His coaching success with 4 championship appearances in the US at the professional level reinforces his standing as one of the most successful Black coaches in the history of US professional soccer.

=== Turks and Caicos Islands ===
In 2023 Hill was named head coach of the Turks & Caicos Islands national team.

== Publications ==
In 2021, Hill penned the autobiography Love of the Game – Ricky Hill: The Man Who Brought the Rooney Rule to the UK, which was nominated as a finalist for the 2022 Sports Books Awards in association with The Sunday Times (UK).

Synopsis of "Love of the Game – Ricky Hill

"Ricky Hill grew up beneath the shadow of Wembley Stadium, where he sold programmes at England games as a boy. When he was seven, he was told by a teacher that only two in every hundred boys could possibly make it as a professional footballer. Ricky told her he would be one of the two. Ten years later, this gifted midfielder scored on his debut for Luton Town. Ricky stayed with Luton for 14 years, made 506 League and Cup appearances, and became a club legend. Emerging at a time when racism was rife, he was only the fourth Black player to represent England. Later, as a coach, he had to fight to smash down barriers holding back Black managers and devised an equivalent of the NFL's 'Rooney Rule' to help Black applicants secure senior coaching jobs in English football. While Ricky has won trophies and awards overseas, he has been overlooked in this country. In Love of the Game, he tells the shocking story behind his short spell in charge of Luton and reveals just how much the football decision-makers in England have ignored him and other Black coaches." -- Reproduced from "Love of the Game – Ricky Hill: The Man Who Brought the Rooney Rule to the UK", 2021 with permission from Pitch Publishing Ltd (ISBN 9781785318269)

Media Reviews of Love of the Game – Ricky Hill

- "Hill's story is a perfect example of how racism of a different kind, that which manifests itself in unconscious bias, still appears to exist... Hill, who won three England caps under Bobby Robson, has not given up on a return to coaching even at the age of 62. This book stands as powerful advocacy for his cause." -- Backpass Magazine
- "An excellent book, an easy read but not a comfortable one." -- Verite Sport

== Honours ==
=== As a player ===
Luton Town

- Football League Second Division: 1981–82
- Football League Cup: 1987–88; runner-up: 1988–89

Individual

- Luton Town Player of the Year

=== As a coach ===
Tampa Bay Rowdies

- American Professional Soccer League (APSL) runner-up: 1992
- Professional Cup runner-up: 1992

Cocoa Expos

- USISL Premier League Eastern Division: 1995
- USISL Championship runner-up: 1995

Sheffield Wednesday U19

- Premier League Academy Cup U19 runner-up: 1999

CL Financial San Juan Jabloteh

- Trinidad and Tobago Pro League Champion: 2003

Tampa Bay Rowdies

- North American Soccer League Soccer Bowl: 2012

Individual

- American Professional Soccer League (APSL) Coach of the Year: 1992
- Trinidad and Tobago Pro League Coach of the Year: 2003
- North American Soccer League Coach of the Year: 2012
- North American Soccer League Fair Play Award: 2011, 2012, 2014 (NASL)
