= Peter Anderson (footballer, born 1949) =

English footballer

Personal information
- Full name: Peter Thomas Anderson
- Date of birth: 31 May 1949 (age 77)
- Place of birth: Hendon, Middlesex, England
- Position: Midfielder

Youth career
- Hendon

Senior career*
Years	Team	Apps	(Gls)
1968–1971	Hendon	83	(35)
1971–1975	Luton Town	181	(34)
1976–1978	Royal Antwerp	30	(9)
1978	San Diego Sockers	11	(6)
1978–1980	Tampa Bay Rowdies	40	(8)
1978–1979	→ Sheffield United (loan)	30	(12)
1979–1980	Tampa Bay Rowdies (indoor)	11	(7)
1980–1982	Millwall	32	(4)
1983–1984	Hendon		

Managerial career
- 1980–1982: Millwall
- * Club domestic league appearances and goals

Peter Thomas Anderson (born 31 May 1949) is an English former football midfielder and manager.

== Club career ==
Anderson began his career in the Hendon F.C. Academy, turning professional with the club in 1968. In 1970, he transferred to Luton Town. His first match came on 13 February 1971 in a 1–0 victory over Watford. In December 1975, Luton Town sold Anderson to Royal Antwerp in order to prevent banckruptcy. In 1978, Anderson moved to the San Diego Sockers of the North American Soccer League. He played eleven matches, scoring six goals off two hat tricks, before a midseason transfer to the Tampa Bay Rowdies. The Rowdies advanced all the way to Soccer Bowl '78. He played in Tampa for three outdoor and two NASL indoor seasons. In the fall of 1978, he went on loan to Sheffield United, but broke his collar bone late in the English season and missed all of the 1979 NASL season, except for six playoff games and Soccer Bowl '79. The following March, Anderson scored the title-clinching goal in a mini-game tie-breaker for the Rowdies versus Memphis in the 1980 NASL Indoor Championship Finals. In 1980, Millwall hired Anderson as player-manager. In 1982, the team released him and he finished his career with Hendon before returning to live in the United States.

In 1997, he founded Bayshore Technologies in Tampa Bay.

== Honors ==
- NASL 1979–80 Indoor Championship
- Soccer Bowl '78 (runner up)
- Soccer Bowl '79 (runner up)
