= Billy Rafferty =

Scottish footballer

Personal information
- Full name: William Henry Rafferty
- Date of birth: 30 December 1950 (age 75)
- Place of birth: Glasgow, Scotland
- Position: Forward

Youth career
- –: Port Glasgow
- –: Coventry City

Senior career*
Years	Team	Apps	(Gls)
1968–1972	Coventry City	27	(3)
1972–1974	Blackpool	36	(9)
1974–1976	Plymouth Argyle	90	(35)
1976–1978	Carlisle United	72	(27)
1978–1979	Wolverhampton Wanderers	44	(6)
1979–1980	Newcastle United	39	(6)
1980–1984	Portsmouth	102	(40)
1984–1985	AFC Bournemouth	58	(19)
1985–1988?	Farense	79	(53)
–	Louletano	12	(14)
- * Club domestic league appearances and goals

William Henry Rafferty (born 30 December 1950) is a Scottish retired footballer who played as a forward. He appeared in the Football League for Coventry City, Blackpool, Plymouth Argyle, Carlisle United, Wolverhampton Wanderers, Newcastle United, Portsmouth and AFC Bournemouth, scoring 145 goals in 468 matches. He finished his career in Portugal with spells at Louletano and Farense.

Rafferty began his league career with Coventry City after joining them from Port Glasgow but found opportunities few and far between. A move to Blackpool in 1972 saw him play and score more regularly before joining Plymouth Argyle a year later. With his striking partner, Paul Mariner, he became an important player in the Argyle side that won promotion to the Football League Second Division in 1975. Their partnership contributed 47 goals to the campaign, with Rafferty scoring 26.

He then joined Carlisle United where he continued to score regularly. He moved on to Wolverhampton Wanderers and Newcastle United. After Newcastle he joined Portsmouth in 1980. At Portsmouth, Rafferty once again became a key striker, winning the Third Division championship in 1983 before joining AFC Bournemouth, which would be his last league club in England.

== Honours ==
Portsmouth

- Football League Third Division: 1982–83
