= Brian Chambers (footballer) =

English footballer (born 1949)

Personal information
- Full name: Brian Mark Chambers
- Date of birth: 31 October 1949 (age 77)
- Place of birth: Newcastle upon Tyne, England
- Position: Midfielder

Senior career*
Years	Team	Apps	(Gls)
1970–1973	Sunderland	63	(5)
1973–1974	Arsenal	1	(0)
1974–1977	Luton Town	76	(9)
1977–1979	Millwall	59	(9)
1979–1981	AFC Bournemouth	42	(7)
1981	Halifax Town	10	(1)
1981–1985	Poole Town		
1985–1986	Salisbury City		(1)
1986–1989	Dorchester Town		
1989–1991	Swanage Town		
1991–1992	Poole Town		
Total		251	(31)

Managerial career
- 1990-1991: Swanage Town
- 1991-1992: Poole Town
- * Club domestic league appearances and goals

Brian Mark Chambers (born 31 October 1949) is an English former professional footballer who played as a midfielder. He played in the Football League for Sunderland, Arsenal, Luton Town, Millwall, AFC Bournemouth and Halifax Town, before moving into non-league football.

== Life and career ==
Chambers was born on 31 October 1949 in Newcastle upon Tyne, where he attended St Mary's RC Boys' Technical School and played football for the school team. He represented Newcastle schools, and in 1965 became an England schoolboy international.

When he left school, he joined Sunderland, and was a member of their 1966–67 FA Youth Cup-winning team. He turned professional with Sunderland in August 1967, and remained with the club for a further six years, scoring 7 goals from 71 appearances in all competitions.

In 1973, Chambers signed for Arsenal for a fee of £30,000.

After later spells with Luton Town, Millwall, AFC Bournemouth and Halifax Town, he moved into non-league football where he had spells with several clubs in the Southern League. He later became a player manager, initially at Swanage Town & Herston, and then at Poole Town.

== Honours ==
Sunderland

- FA Youth Cup: 1966–67
