= Alan West (footballer) =

English footballer

Personal information
- Date of birth: 18 December 1951 (age 74)
- Place of birth: Hyde, Cheshire, England
- Height: 5 ft 8 1/2 in (1.74 m)
- Position: Midfielder

Senior career*
Years	Team	Apps	(Gls)
1967–1973	Burnley	45	(3)
1973–1981	Luton Town	285	(16)
1976–1979	→ Minnesota Kicks (loan)	79	(35)
1981–1983	Millwall	57	(4)
Total		387	(23)

International career
1972	England U23	1	(0)
- * Club domestic league appearances and goals

Alan West (born 18 December 1951 in Hyde, Cheshire) is an English retired football central midfielder. He attended Greenfield Street Boys' Secondary Modern School in Hyde, Cheshire.

West began his career at Burnley, a product of the club's prolific youth system. In 1973, he was set for a move to Sunderland but was told by medical staff that he had a condition which meant he would be crippled if he continued playing. He believed there was nothing wrong, and moved to Luton Town that year.

He spent eight seasons at Luton Town, becoming an important player as well as club captain. West made his name as a cultured midfielder who though not prolific was a fine passer of the ball. He was ever-present in his one top-flight season with the Hatters (1974–75). In 1976, he moved the Minnesota Kicks of the North American Soccer League, playing with the team through the 1979 season. Moving to Millwall in 1981, West spent two seasons there before moving on to non-League football - as player-manager of Isthmian League Hitchin Town, being sacked in September 1988 after a poor start to the season.

== Personal life ==
West became a Christian whilst in New Zealand aged 25 and regularly talks of his faith. He trained at seminary to become a Christian minister and was Lead Pastor at Luton Christian Fellowship and the Ealing Church also returning as pastor and club chaplain at Luton Town Football Club until 2017.
