= Keith Barber (footballer) =

English footballer

Personal information
- Date of birth: 21 September 1947 (age 79)
- Place of birth: Luton, England
- Position: Goalkeeper

Senior career*
Years	Team	Apps	(Gls)
- Dunstable Town
1970–1977	Luton Town	142	(0)
1977–1978	Swansea City	42	(0)
1978	→ Cardiff City (loan)	2	(0)
- Bridgend Town
- * Club domestic league appearances and goals

Keith Barber (born 21 September 1947) is an English former professional footballer best known as a player for Luton Town.

== Career ==
After a time with Dunstable Town, Barber was signed by his home-town club Luton Town in 1970. Playing in goal for seven years, he made 142 league appearances for Luton before moving to Swansea City in 1977. After a season with Swansea, during which he was part of the side that won promotion to the Third Division, he spent a two-game loan spell at rivals Cardiff City before moving into non-League football with Bridgend Town.
