= John Faulkner (footballer) =

English footballer and coach

Personal information
- Date of birth: 10 March 1948
- Place of birth: Orpington, Kent, England
- Date of death: 28 December 2017 (aged 69)
- Position: Defender

Senior career*
| Years | Team | Apps | (Gls) |
| 1967–1969 | Cray Wanderers | ? | (?) |
| 1969–1970 | Sutton United | ? | (?) |
| 1970–1972 | Leeds United | 2 | (0) |
| 1972–1978 | Luton Town | 209 | (6) |
| 1978–1980 | Memphis Rogues | 74 | (5) |
| 1980–1981 | California Surf | 13 | (1) |
| 1980–1981 | →California Surf (indoor) | 8 | (0) |
- * Club domestic league appearances and goals

John Faulkner (10 March 1948 – 28 December 2017) was an English professional football player and coach. Faulkner, who was born in Orpington, Kent, played as a defender for Leeds United and Luton Town in the 1970s. During the 1990s he had two spells as assistant manager at Norwich City.

== Playing career ==
Faulkner joined Sutton United in 1969 from fellow minnows Cray Wanderers and was playing for the non-league side when they met Leeds United in the fourth round of the FA Cup in 1970. He effectively marked Leeds centre forward, Mick Jones, during the game and impressed Leeds manager, Don Revie, sufficiently for Revie to sign him as cover for Jack Charlton who was then in his mid-30s. Faulkner made his debut against Burnley in April 1970, when he scored an own goal, and made his second appearance against Manchester City, two weeks later, when he broke his kneecap in a collision with an opposing player. Charlton retained his place in the first-team in the following seasons and Faulkner made only two more appearances for Leeds against Lierse SK in the Inter Cities Fairs Cup. In March 1972, he joined Luton Town, for whom he made 209 appearances. Faulkner later played in the North American Soccer League for the Memphis Rogues and the California Surf.

=== Playing statistics ===
| Club | League | FA Cup | League Cup | Europe | Total |
| | Apps (goals) | Apps (goals) | Apps (goals) | Apps (goals) | Apps (goals) |
| Leeds United | 2 (0) | 0 (0) | 0 (0) | 2 (0) | 4 (0) |
| Luton Town | 209 (6) | | | | |

== Coaching career ==
In 1985 John was pleased to receive a call from David Pleat asking him to join his coaching staff. He went on to serve under John Moore, Ray Harford and Jimmy Ryan. In the summer of 1992, Faulkner was invited by the new Norwich City manager Mike Walker to join the coaching staff at the club as reserve team manager. He filled the role for three seasons, surviving two changes of manager, until the club, now managed by Gary Megson, was relegated to Division One at the end of the 1994–95 season. Most of the coaching staff, including Faulkner, left the club as a result.

However, a year later Walker returned to the club and made Faulkner his assistant manager. Faulkner's second spell at Norwich lasted two seasons and, when Walker left in April 1998, he was appointed caretaker manager for the remaining game of the season, a 1–0 victory over Reading. He left the club in June when Bruce Rioch and Bryan Hamilton were hired as the club's new managerial team.

He also assisted AFC Wimbledon during the club's rise through the leagues most notably when he was involved as an advisor in the recruitment of Terry Brown as manager in 2007. Following that appointment, John worked alongside Terry Brown and Stuart Cash for the following three years. Chief Executive Erik Samuelson said: "I first met John when he was training as a sports psychologist. He showed an interest in our club, but modestly didn't tell me about his own career until quite some time after we met. Later we asked him to help in various aspects of the Club, most notably when he was involved as an advisor in the recruitment of Terry Brown as our manager in 2007. Following that appointment, John worked alongside Terry Brown and Stuart Cash for the following three years as well as advising me on wider football matters. Subsequently, he moved on to build his sports psychology business."
