= Harry Haslam (footballer, born 1921) =

English football manager (1921–1986)

Personal information
- Date of birth: 30 July 1921
- Place of birth: Manchester, England
- Date of death: 11 September 1986 (aged 65)
- Place of death: Biggleswade, England
- Position: Full-back

Senior career*
Years	Team	Apps	(Gls)
?–1946	Rochdale	0	(0)
1946–1947	Oldham Athletic	2	(0)
1947–1948	Brighton and Hove Albion	0	(0)
1948–1949	Leyton Orient	7	(0)
1949	Guildford City		

Managerial career
- 1956–1959: Barry Town
- 1960s: Tonbridge
- 1972–1978: Luton Town
- 1978–1981: Sheffield United
- * Club domestic league appearances and goals

Harry Haslam (30 July 1921 – 11 September 1986) was an English football player and manager in the Football League between the 1940s and 1980s.

A full-back, Haslam played for Rochdale as an amateur, before moving to Oldham Athletic in 1946–47, for whom he made two League appearances. After a short spell with Brighton & Hove Albion he moved to Leyton Orient for 1948-49, with whom he made seven league appearances, before joining Guildford City.

He managed Tonbridge in the 1960s, winning the Kent Senior Cup in 1964–65, and went on to manage the club on a record 552 occasions. Haslam became manager of Luton Town in 1972 and he led them to promotion to the Football League First Division for 1974–75.

In 1978, he became manager of Sheffield United, and he remained in charge until 1980. Under Haslam's management, Sheffield United almost signed Argentinian footballer Diego Maradona who was then 17 years old. However the agreed fee was increased and Maradona, who had made his way to the airport, had to remain in Argentina for the time being.
