= Jimmy Ryan (footballer, born 1945) =

Scottish football player and manager (born 1945)

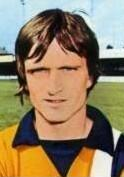

Personal information
- Full name: James Ryan
- Date of birth: 12 May 1945 (age 81)
- Place of birth: Stirling, Scotland
- Position: Forward

Youth career
- ?–1962: Cowie Hearts
- 1962–1963: Manchester United

Senior career*
Years	Team	Apps	(Gls)
1963–1970	Manchester United	24	(4)
1970–1976	Luton Town	184	(21)
1976–1979	Dallas Tornado	97	(21)
1979–1982	Wichita Wings (indoor)	101	(73)
Total		406	(119)

Managerial career
- 1990–1991: Luton Town
- 1991–2000: Manchester United Reserves
- 1998–1999: Manchester United (assistant)
- 2001–2002: Manchester United (assistant)
- * Club domestic league appearances and goals

James Ryan (born 12 May 1945) is a Scottish former professional footballer who played as a winger. He spent the majority of his professional career in England, starting with Manchester United before moving to Luton Town in 1970. In 1976, he moved to the United States, where he played for the Dallas Tornado in the North American Soccer League (NASL) and the Wichita Wings in the Major Indoor Soccer League (MISL).

Upon his return to England in 1984, Ryan took over as manager of Luton Town's reserve team before taking charge of the senior team from January 1990 to May 1991. In June 1991, he was appointed by Alex Ferguson as the manager of Manchester United's reserve team, a position he held for ten years. He was also the club's assistant manager for the 2001–02 season, before being made Director of Youth Football in 2002. He retired in June 2012, following 21 years on the Manchester United coaching staff. He is the father of former footballer and current manager of Manchester united U18s Neil Ryan.

== Playing career ==
Born in Stirling, Ryan started his career with Cowie Hearts. At the age of 17, he was spotted by a scout and invited for an initial two-week trial with English club Manchester United. The trial was extended to a month and Ryan signed as an apprentice with the club on 7 December 1962. A month later, he signed his first professional contract, but it was not until May 1966 that he made his first-team debut, playing on the right wing in the final four league games of the 1965–66 season. He scored his first goal in the third of those games, the third goal in a 6–1 home win over Aston Villa.

He played for Manchester United for four more seasons and was part of the team that won the 1966–67 Football League and 1967–68 European Cup. However, being in competition for a position with George Best (among others) meant that his appearances were limited and he left the club for Luton Town in 1970, along with Don Givens. In five seasons with Manchester United, he played 27 times and scored four goals. He played for Luton Town until 1976, when he left to play four seasons in the North American Soccer League with the Dallas Tornado. In 1979, the NASL players decided to strike for better pay, but Ryan was the only Tornado player to honour the strike. At the end of the 1979 season, Ryan moved to the Wichita Wings of the Major Indoor Soccer League where he finished his career with three indoor seasons.

== Managerial career ==
After living in the United States for eight years, Ryan returned to England to take over as manager of the Luton Town reserve team. Following Luton's dismissal of Ray Harford, Ryan was promoted for an 16-month spell as manager on 11 January 1990, saving the club from relegation on the last day of two successive seasons. However, he was sacked on 13 May 1991, and replaced by David Pleat. Three weeks later, Manchester United manager Alex Ferguson made Ryan the club's reserve team manager after a club reshuffle caused by the departure of his assistant Archie Knox. He held the position until 2000, when he was promoted to coach the first-team. After assistant manager Brian Kidd left to manage Blackburn Rovers in December 1998, Ryan stood in as Ferguson's assistant until Steve McClaren's appointment in February 1999, taking full charge of the side for their 3–2 defeat at home to Middlesbrough on 19 December 1998, which Ferguson missed in order to attend a funeral. Ryan was named as assistant manager again after McClaren left to manage Middlesbrough in 2001, but remained in the post for just one season until Carlos Queiroz took over. From 2002, he was named as the club's Director of Youth Football, a position he held until his retirement in June 2012.

== Career statistics ==
Appearances and goals by club, season and competition
Club	Season	League		National cup		League cup		Continental		Other (Note: Charity Shield, Watney Cup and the Intercontinental Cup.)		Total	
Club	Season	Apps	Goals	Apps	Goals	Apps	Goals	Apps	Goals	Apps	Goals	Apps	Goals
Manchester United	1965–66	4	1	0	0	–		0	0	0	0	4	1
Manchester United	1966–67	5	0	1	0	0	0	–		–		6	0
Manchester United	1967–68	8	2	0	0	–		1	0	0	0	9	2
Manchester United	1968–69	6	1	0	0	–		1	0	0	0	7	1
Manchester United	1969–70	1	0	0	0	0	0	–		–		1	0
Manchester United	Total	24	4	1	0	0	0	2	0	0	0	27	4
Luton Town	1969–70							–		–			
Luton Town	1970–71							–					
Luton Town	1971–72							–		–			
Luton Town	1972–73							–					
Luton Town	1973–74							–		–			
Luton Town	1974–75							–					
Luton Town	1975–76							–		–			
Luton Town	Total	184	21										
Dallas Tornado	1976	23	9	–		–		–		–		23	9
Dallas Tornado	1977	26	4	–		–		–		–		26	4
Dallas Tornado	1978	27	8	–		–		–		–		27	8
Dallas Tornado	1979	21	0	–		–		–		–		21	0
Dallas Tornado	Total	97	21	–		–		–		–		97	21
Wichita Wings (indoor)	1979–80	29	26	–		–		–		–		29	26
Wichita Wings (indoor)	1980–81	37	27	–		–		–		–		37	27
Wichita Wings (indoor)	1981–82	35	20	–		–		–		–		35	20
Wichita Wings (indoor)	Total	101	73	–		–		–		–		101	73
Career total		585	207	52	21	30	11	34	11	8	3	709	253

== Honours ==
=== Manager ===
Manchester United Reserves

- Central League North: 1993–94, 1995–96, 1996–97
- Manchester Senior Cup: 1998–99, 1999–2000
