= 2004–05 Luton Town F.C. season =

English football club season

Luton Town
2004–05 season
- Chairman: Bill Tomlins
- Manager: Mike Newell
- League One: First (promoted as champions)
- FA Cup: Third round
- Football League Cup: First round
- Football League Trophy: Southern Section First Round
- Top goalscorer: League: Steve Howard (18); All: Steve Howard (22)
- Highest home attendance: 9,500 vs Sheffield Wednesday (League One, 1 January 2005)
- Lowest home attendance: 6,603 vs Stockport County (League One, 15 January 2005)
- Average home league attendance: 7,896
Home colours	Away colours

The 2004–05 season was the 119th season in the history of Luton Town Football Club, and club's 84th consecutive year in the Football League. Luton ended the season as champions of the rebranded League One competition, formerly known as the Second Division, with 98 points, achieving promotion to the Championship; the club's first elevation to that level since the 1981–82 season.

The club spent very little money bringing in new players to win the title, instead relying on existing players, use of the loan system and the robust youth set-up. Much of the success was built on a strong defence, headed by youth graduate Curtis Davies, which let in the fewest goals of any team; the leadership of combative midfielder and captain Kevin Nicholls, who unlike in previous years remained uninjured for the whole season; and the team's ability to score late goals – of the 87 goals the team scored in the league, almost a fifth came in the last ten minutes of matches.

This article covers the period from 1 July 2004 to 30 June 2005.

== Background ==
With Luton Town losing up to £500,000 per month and the very real threat of its history and heritage being destroyed by controversial owner John Gurney, supporters' trust Trust in Luton deliberately placed the club into administrative receivership in July 2003 after taking a controlling interest in the club's major creditor. Gurney was successfully forced out as a result, but administration meant that the club was unable to sign players without special dispensation from the authorities during the 2003–04 season and, therefore, a finish of tenth place in the league was viewed by many to be a success.

On 12 May 2004, four days after the last game of the campaign, businessman Bill Tomlins completed his takeover of the club, securing its immediate future. Manager Mike Newell began the process of keeping key players, committing defenders Chris Coyne and Russell Perrett, midfielders Paul Hughes, Michael Leary and Steve Robinson, and youth players Curtis Davies, Rob Beckwith and Stephen O'Leary to two-year contracts, as well as rejecting an offer from Sheffield Wednesday for leading scorer Steve Howard. Popular striker Adrian Forbes left the club and dropped down to the league below, signing for Swansea City on a free transfer in late June.

== Review ==
=== July ===
Experienced goalkeeper Marlon Beresford returned to Luton, where he had spent three months during the previous season, on a free transfer on 1 July from Barnsley. The same day, midfielder Matthew Spring, who had started his career at Luton and made nearly 300 appearances for the team, joined Championship club Leeds United on a Bosman free transfer. On 12 July 2003–04 Player of the Year Emmerson Boyce, another who had graduated through the youth system, turned down the offer of a new contract and joined Premier League club Crystal Palace on a free transfer. The club signed Slovenian goalkeeper Dino Seremet on a two-year contract on 23 July from NK Maribor, the player arriving on a free transfer following a successful trial period.

After five friendly victories against local sides, Luton were brought back to earth with a 4–0 home loss to Dutch champions and former European Cup winners Ajax on 23 July. Striker Matthew Blinkhorn joined Luton on a three-month loan from Blackpool a week later.

A 1–1 draw with Premier League club Charlton Athletic on 31 July rounded off pre-season, with the first league game of the campaign beginning a week later.

=== August ===
A day before the first game with Oldham Athletic, Luton signed Portsmouth's 21-year-old striker Rowan Vine on a three-month loan, with a view to extending this for the whole season. Vine started in the team that beat Oldham 2–1 on 7 August, with goals from Steve Howard and Paul Underwood resulting in a Luton victory in an otherwise even game. Narrow, albeit high-scoring, victories away to Swindon Town and Barnsley pushed Luton into second place in the table, and marked the first time since the 1981–82 season that the club had won their first three games of a campaign.

The team kept their first clean sheet with a 1–0 win over Torquay United on 21 August that pushed them into first place. A week later, Luton won 3–1 away to Blackpool in a game they dominated, scoring three goals in the second half to win their third away game – the same number of away wins achieved in the entirety of the previous season. Howard scored again to make it five goals in five League One games and, including the previous season, ten goals in ten consecutive games. A 1–0 home win against AFC Bournemouth two days later, captain Kevin Nicholls scoring the winning goal late on with a 25-yard curling shot, gave Luton a six-point lead at the top of the table.

These six wins in a row saw Mike Newell presented with the Manager of the Month award, and Steve Howard awarded the Player of the Month trophy for his five goals.

=== September ===
Youth player Keith Keane, who had played a number of games in August in place of the injured Kevin Foley, was rewarded for his performances with a two-year professional contract on 3 September. Soon after, on-loan striker Rowan Vine extended his loan until the end of the season following a strong start.

Luton's 100% record came to an end on 4 September when they drew 0–0 at Sheffield Wednesday. Three days later, the club was knocked out of the League Cup after a 4–3 extra time loss to League Two club Boston United.

Luton clearly did not dwell on either of these setbacks, winning their next three league games to extend the gap to second-placed Tranmere Rovers to nine points. In this period, the club signed striker Gary McSheffrey on a one-month loan, a player who had proved a success in a three-month loan spell the previous season. First-choice goalkeeper Marlon Beresford was injured in a 2–1 home win against Peterborough United, meaning back-up Dino Seremet made his debut as a substitute. Seremet's first start did not go so well, as Luton were knocked out of the Football League Trophy, again by lower league opposition, in a 2–0 loss to Swansea City on 28 September. Youth players Calvin Andrew and Leon Barnett both signed three-year professional contracts the same day.

A Luton player won the League One Player of the Month award for the second month in a row, Rowan Vine picking up the award after scoring three goals in four league games.

=== October ===
A 1–1 draw away to closest rivals Tranmere Rovers on 2 October was described as "the toughest test for [the team] yet" by Mike Newell. Following a 3–0 win against Hartlepool United six days later, the club had gone over a quarter of the league season unbeaten.

This record quickly evaporated with three defeats in a row, to Huddersfield Town, Walsall, and a heavy 3–0 loss against Hull City, who had now overtaken Tranmere as Luton's nearest rivals. Newell refused to be flustered despite dropping nine points, stating that "there isn't a lot wrong" and that bad luck had played a part in the defeats.

The injury to Marlon Beresford and poor goalkeeping performances from Dino Seremet led Luton to sign Simon Royce on a one-month loan from Charlton Athletic on 29 October. A 4–0 home win against Bradford City came one day later, with Ahmet Brković opening the scoring with a "sensational" bicycle kick.

=== November ===
Director of Football Mick Harford left the club on 5 November to take up the post of assistant manager at Nottingham Forest.

The club remained unbeaten throughout November, winning convincingly against Wrexham and Milton Keynes Dons, drawing against Doncaster Rovers, and claiming an FA Cup first round victory over Southend United.

Luton rejected a bid for Steve Howard during November from Championship club Nottingham Forest, managed by former Luton boss Joe Kinnear. Leon Barnett, who had graduated through the youth team, signed for non-League Aylesbury United on loan for a month on 19 November.

Central defender Curtis Davies became the third Luton player in four months to win the League One Player of the Month award for his performances in November.

=== December ===
Luton secured a place in the FA Cup third round following a 3–0 win away to Wycombe Wanderers on 4 December.

Steve Howard was sent off early in Luton's game at Brentford on 7 December, with the club losing 2–0 in their fourth league defeat of the season and reducing their lead at the top of the table to just one point. However, wins against Port Vale, Bristol City, and Chesterfield allowed Luton to pull out a lead once again. The performances of squad players such as Russell Perrett and Enoch Showunmi, filling in for injuries and suspensions, were cited by Mike Newell as key to these three victories.

On 16 December, defenders David Bayliss and Ian Hillier both joined League Two club Chester City on one-month loans.

2004 ended in a 2–2 home draw with Colchester United, Rowan Vine scoring twice.

=== January ===
Two draws in the league saw Luton usurped as league leaders by Hull City, marking the first time during the season that they had been in a place other than top since 28 August. Luton were then knocked out of the FA Cup with a 2–0 home defeat to Brentford on 8 January.

The loans of David Bayliss and Ian Hillier at Chester City were both extended for a further month on 14 January.

The club returned to the top of the table with their first win in four games, beating bottom-of-the-table Stockport County 3–0 on 15 January. Further draws with Colchester United and Tranmere Rovers still left Luton as leaders, as Hull began to drop points.

=== February ===
Left-back Sol Davis signed a one-year contract extension on 3 February.

On 5 February, Luton drew for the third time in a row, this time with Huddersfield Town, conceding in the fourth minute of added time. A draw for Hull left them one point behind Luton in the table, with the next match taking place between the two sides at Kenilworth Road one week later. A close match was eventually won by Luton, Ahmet Brković scoring in the last minute of the game to pull out a four-point lead.

Three further wins in quick succession over Hartlepool United, Bradford City and Walsall saw this four-point gap increase to nine, and even a loss to Port Vale in late February, described by Newell as their "worst performance of the season", that ended a 14-game unbeaten league run kept Luton comfortably in first place.

=== March ===
Luton put the defeat to Port Vale behind them with a 5–0 thrashing of Bristol City and then a 3–1 win over Swindon Town.

Influential midfielders Kevin Nicholls and Ahmet Brković both signed one-year contract extensions on 3 March. On 10 March, manager Mike Newell signed a two-year contract extension alongside his assistant manager Brian Stein. Young goalkeeper Dean Brill signed a one-year contract extension on 14 March. Two days later, Wycombe Wanderers rejected a £100,000 bid from Luton for their top scorer Nathan Tyson.

The club drew 2–2 with Oldham Athletic on 19 March, with a last-minute Steve Howard goal earning a point that saw Hull City close the gap to the top.

Northern Ireland international striker Warren Feeney signed for Luton on 24 March for a £150,000 fee from Stockport County, where he had scored 17 goals. A 3–1 defeat the next day to Barnsley, coupled with a draw for Hull, meant Luton conceded top place in the table again, though both clubs were still safely above the play-off places. A 4–1 win over Torquay United on 28 March, along with Hull losing, lifted Luton back into first.

=== April ===
Luton went the entirety of April without losing or drawing, with consecutive victories against Blackpool, Bournemouth, Milton Keynes Dons, Wrexham and Brentford securing promotion to the Championship and first place in the table; the club's first promotion to the second tier of English football since the 1981–82 season.

Chris Coyne was awarded the Player of the Month trophy for April, making him the fourth Luton player in nine months to win the accolade, while Mike Newell won the Manager of the Month award for the second time during the season.

=== May and June ===
Luton ended the season with an incident-packed 3–3 draw with Doncaster Rovers on 7 May.

The club had six players named in the League One Team of the Year – goalkeeper Marlon Beresford; centre-backs Curtis Davies and Chris Coyne; midfielders Kevin Nicholls and Ahmet Brković; and top scorer Steve Howard. Curtis Davies was also named as the overall League One Player of the Year, a notable achievement considering this was the 20-year-old's first full season.

On 17 May, it was announced that Wrexham's Trinidadian international winger Carlos Edwards would join Luton on a free transfer on 1 July 2005, signing a three-year contract. Lee Mansell, who had played only three times during the season, joined Oxford United on a free transfer on 7 June. Steve Howard, who had been the subject of bids from Sheffield Wednesday, Nottingham Forest and Burnley throughout the season, committed himself to Luton on 16 June by signing a new two-year contract. Midfielder Peter Holmes also agreed a one-year extension to his contract. On 30 June, defender David Bayliss left Luton to join Wrexham.

== Match results ==
Luton Town results given first.

=== Legend ===
Win	Draw	Loss

=== Friendlies ===
Date	Opponent	Venue	Result	Attendance	Scorers	Notes
14 July 2004	St Albans City	Away	6–0	Unknown	Brković (2), Pitt (2), Meechan, McMahon	
14 July 2004	Aylesbury United	Away	3–0	Unknown	Mansell, Howard, Sinclair	
17 July 2004	Rugby United	Away	3–1	Unknown	Jephcott, Brković, Meechan	
17 July 2004	Dunstable Town	Away	4–1	Unknown	Howard (2), Mansell, Pitt	
20 July 2004	Hitchin Town	Away	4–1	Unknown	Howard, Hillier, Showunmi, Bayliss	
24 July 2004	Ajax	Home	0–4	7,543	–	
28 July 2004	Falkirk	Away	1–2	2,492	Showunmi	
31 July 2004	Charlton Athletic	Home	1–1	2,711	O'Leary	

=== League One ===
All results, goals, attendances etc. taken from Soccerbase and verified with official Luton Town match reports.

Date	Opponent	Venue	Result	Attendance	Scorers	Notes
7 August 2004	Oldham Athletic	Home	2–1	6,634	Howard, Underwood	
11 August 2004	Swindon Town	Away	3–2	6,286	Nicholls (pen), own goal, Howard	
14 August 2004	Barnsley	Away	4–3	10,057	Howard, Vine, Brković, Robinson	
21 August 2004	Torquay United	Home	1–0	6,664	Howard	
28 August 2004	Blackpool	Away	3–1	5,793	Howard, Brković (2)	
30 August 2004	AFC Bournemouth	Home	1–0	7,404	Nicholls	
4 September 2004	Sheffield Wednesday	Away	0–0	20,806	–	
11 September 2004	Chesterfield	Home	1–0	7,532	Vine	
18 September 2004	Stockport County	Away	3–1	5,128	Robinson, Vine, Brković	
25 September 2004	Peterborough United	Home	2–1	7,694	Vine, Underwood	
2 October 2004	Tranmere Rovers	Away	1–1	10,884	Coyne	
8 October 2004	Hartlepool United	Home	3–0	7,865	Howard, Brković, McSheffrey	
16 October 2004	Huddersfield Town	Home	1–2	8,192	Underwood	
19 October 2004	Walsall	Away	0–2	5,963	–	
23 October 2004	Hull City	Away	0–3	18,575	–	
30 October 2004	Bradford City	Home	4–0	7,975	Brković (2), Howard, Underwood	
6 November 2004	Wrexham	Home	5–1	7,144	Robinson, Davis, O'Leary, Howard, Brković	
20 November 2004	Milton Keynes Dons	Away	4–1	7,620	Vine, Howard (3)	
27 November 2004	Doncaster Rovers	Home	1–1	8,142	Nicholls	
7 December 2004	Brentford	Away	0–2	6,393	–	
11 December 2004	Port Vale	Home	1–0	6,974	Brković	
18 December 2004	Bristol City	Away	2–1	13,414	Coyne, Showunmi	
26 December 2004	Chesterfield	Away	1–0	7,158	Showunmi	
28 December 2004	Colchester United	Home	2–2	8,806	Vine (2)	
1 January 2005	Sheffield Wednesday	Home	1–1	9,500	Howard	
3 January 2005	Peterborough United	Away	2–2	7,662	Nicholls, Howard	
15 January 2005	Stockport County	Home	3–0	6,603	Coyne, Howard, Nicholls (pen)	
22 January 2005	Colchester United	Away	0–0	4,309	–	
29 January 2005	Tranmere Rovers	Home	1–1	8,594	Nicholls (pen)	
5 February 2005	Huddersfield Town	Away	1–1	12,611	Brković	
12 February 2005	Hull City	Home	1–0	9,500	Brković	
15 February 2005	Hartlepool United	Away	3–2	5,542	Coyne, Showunmi, Foley	
19 February 2005	Bradford City	Away	1–0	8,702	Vine	
22 February 2005	Walsall	Home	1–0	7,236	Nicholls (pen)	
26 February 2005	Port Vale	Away	1–3	5,353	Foley	
5 March 2005	Bristol City	Home	5–0	8,330	Brković (2), Nicholls (pen), Davis, Holmes	
12 March 2005	Swindon Town	Home	3–1	8,173	Nicholls (pen), Brković, Holmes	
19 March 2005	Oldham Athletic	Away	2–2	5,809	Underwood, Howard	
25 March 2005	Barnsley	Home	1–3	7,548	Showunmi	
28 March 2005	Torquay United	Away	4–1	4,264	Nicholls, Holmes, Howard, Vine	
2 April 2005	Blackpool	Home	1–0	7,816	Howard	
9 April 2005	AFC Bournemouth	Away	1–0	9,058	Showunmi	
16 April 2005	Milton Keynes Dons	Home	1–0	9,000	own goal	
23 April 2005	Wrexham	Away	2–1	6,614	Davies, Coyne	
30 April 2005	Brentford	Home	4–2	9,313	Brković, Nicholls (pen), Showunmi, Robinson	
7 May 2005	Doncaster Rovers	Away	3–3	8,928	Perrett, Howard, Nicholls	

=== FA Cup ===
Round	Date	Opponent	Venue	Result	Attendance	Scorers	Notes
First round	12 November 2004	Southend United	Away	3–0	6,683	Howard (2), Brković	
Second round	4 December 2004	Wycombe Wanderers	Away	3–0	4,767	Howard (2), Nicholls	
Third round	8 January 2005	Brentford	Home	0–2	6,861	–	

=== Football League Cup ===
Round	Date	Opponent	Venue	Result	Attendance	Scorers	Notes
First round	7 September 2004	Boston United	Away	3–4 (aet)	2,631	own goal, Nicholls (pen), Showunmi	

=== Football League Trophy ===
Round	Date	Opponent	Venue	Result	Attendance	Scorers	Notes
First round	28 September 2004	Swansea City	Away	0–2	3,559	–	

== League table ==
Pos	Team	Pld	W	D	L	GF	GA	GD	Pts	Promotion or relegation
1	Luton Town (C, P)	46	29	11	6	87	48	+39	98	Promotion to Football League Championship
2	Hull City (P)	46	26	8	12	80	53	+27	86	Promotion to Football League Championship
3	Tranmere Rovers	46	22	13	11	73	55	+18	79	Qualification for League One play-offs
4	Brentford	46	22	9	15	57	60	−3	75	Qualification for League One play-offs
5	Sheffield Wednesday (O, P)	46	19	15	12	77	59	+18	72	Qualification for League One play-offs

Updated to match(es) played on May 2005. Source:
Rules for classification: 1) points; 2) goal difference; 3) number of goals scored.
(C) Champions; (O) Play-off winners; (P) Promoted

== Player statistics ==
Last match played on 7 May 2005. Players with a zero in every column appeared either as unused substitutes or were assigned squad numbers.

No.	Pos.	Name	League		FA Cup		League Cup		FL Trophy		Total		Discipline	
No.	Pos.	Name	Apps	Goals	Apps	Goals	Apps	Goals	Apps	Goals	Apps	Goals	Yellow card	Red card
1	GK	(England) Marlon Beresford	38	0	2	0	1	0	0	0	41	0	0	0
2	DF	(Republic of Ireland) Kevin Foley	38 (1)	2	2	0	0	0	0	0	40 (1)	2	2	0
3	DF	(Wales) Alan Neilson	6 (3)	0	0	0	0	0	1	0	7 (3)	0	1	0
5	DF	(England) Russell Perrett	9 (3)	1	0	0	0	0	0 (1)	0	9 (4)	1	2	1
6	DF/MF	(England) Paul Underwood	37	5	3	0	1	0	0	0	41	5	5	0
7	MF	(England) Paul Hughes	0	0	0	0	0	0	1	0	1	0	0	0
8	MF	(England) Kevin Nicholls	44	12	2	1	1	1	0	0	47	14	7	1
9	FW	(England) Rowan Vine	43 (2)	9	3	0	1	0	0	0	47 (2)	9	5	0
10	FW	(England) Gary McSheffrey	1 (4)	1	0	0	0	0	0	0	1 (4)	1	0	0
11	MF	(Northern Ireland) Steve Robinson	28 (3)	4	2	0	1	0	0	0	31 (3)	4	7	0
12	DF	(Australia) Chris Coyne	39 (1)	5	3	0	1	0	0	0	43	5	5	1
14	MF	(England) Michael Leary	1 (7)	0	0	0	0	0	0	0	1 (7)	0	1	0
15	MF	(Republic of Ireland) Stephen O'Leary	12 (5)	1	2	0	0	0	1	0	15 (5)	0	3	0
16	FW	(Nigeria) Enoch Showunmi	7 (28)	6	0 (3)	0	0 (1)	1	1	0	8 (32)	7	0	0
17	MF	(England) Lee Mansell	0 (1)	0	0	0	1	0	1	0	2 (1)	0	0	0
18	MF	(Croatia) Ahmet Brković	39 (3)	15	3	1	1	0	0	0	43 (3)	16	8	0
19	FW	(Scotland) Steve Howard	40	18	3	4	1	0	0	0	44	22	13	1
20	DF	(England) Curtis Davies	44	1	3	0	1	0	0	0	48	1	7	0
21	MF	(Republic of Ireland) Keith Keane	11 (6)	1	0	0	0	0	1	0	13 (6)	0	5	1
22	DF	(England) David Bayliss	0	0	0 (1)	0	0	0	1	0	1 (1)	0	0	0
23	DF	(Wales) Ian Hillier	0	0	0	0	0	0	0	0	0	0	0	0
24	DF	(England) Sol Davis	45	2	3	0	1	0	0	0	49	2	9	0
25	GK	(Slovenia) Dino Seremet	6 (1)	0	1	0	0	0	1	0	8 (1)	0	1	0
26	FW	(England) Matthew Blinkhorn	0 (2)	0	0	0	0 (1)	0	0	0	0 (3)	0	0	0
26	FW	(Northern Ireland) Warren Feeney	1 (5)	0	0	0	0	0	0	0	1 (5)	0	0	0
27	MF	(England) Peter Holmes	13 (6)	3	0	0	0	0	1	0	14 (6)	3	2	0
28	GK	(England) Simon Royce	2	0	0	0	0	0	0	0	2	0	0	0
29	FW	(England) Calvin Andrew	2 (6)	0	0 (2)	0	0	0	1	0	3 (8)	0	0	0
33	GK	(England) Dean Brill	0	0	0	0	0	0	0	0	0	0	0	0
45	DF	(England) Leon Barnett	0	0	0	0	0	0	1	0	1	0	0	1
47	GK	(England) Rob Beckwith	0	0	0	0	0	0	0	0	0	0	0	0

== Managerial statistics ==
Only competitive games from the 2004–05 season are included.

Name	Nat.	From	To	Record							Honours
Name	Nat.	From	To	PLD	W	D	L	GF	GA	W%	Honours
Mike Newell	(England)	23 June 2003	15 March 2007	51	31	11	9	102	56	60.8	

== Awards ==
Awarded on 2 May 2005.

Award	Name	No.	Pos.	Notes
Supporters' Player of the Season	(England) Kevin Nicholls	8	MF	
Players' Player of the Season	(England) Sol Davis	24	DF	
Website Player of the Season	(England) Kevin Nicholls	8	MF	
Young Player of the Season	(England) Curtis Davies	20	DF	
Young Members' Player of the Season	(Croatia) Ahmet Brković	18	MF	
Special Achievement Award	(England) Marlon Beresford	1	GK	
Goal of the Season	(Croatia) Ahmet Brković	18	MF	^{[A]}

== Transfers ==
=== In ===
Date	Player	From	Fee	Ref.
1 July 2004	(England) Marlon Beresford	Barnsley	Free	
23 July 2004	(Slovenia) Dino Seremet	NK Maribor	Free	
24 March 2005	(Northern Ireland) Warren Feeney	Stockport County	£150,000	

=== Out ===
Date	Player	To	Fee	Ref.
1 July 2004	(England) Matthew Spring	Leeds United	Free	
12 July 2004	(Barbados) Emmerson Boyce	Crystal Palace	Free	
16 June 2005	(England) Lee Mansell	Oxford United	Free	
30 June 2005	(England) David Bayliss	Wrexham	Free	

=== Loans in ===
Date	Player	From	End date	Ref.
30 July 2004	(England) Matthew Blinkhorn	Blackpool	30 October 2004	
6 August 2004	(England) Rowan Vine	Portsmouth	10 May 2005	
17 September 2004	(England) Gary McSheffrey	Coventry City	17 October 2004	
29 October 2004	(England) Simon Royce	Charlton Athletic	29 November 2004	

=== Loans out ===
Date	Player	To	End date	Ref.
19 November 2004	(England) Leon Barnett	Aylesbury United	19 December 2004	
16 December 2004	(England) David Bayliss	Chester City	16 February 2005	
16 December 2004	(Wales) Ian Hillier	Chester City	16 February 2005	

== See also ==
- List of Luton Town F.C. seasons

== Footnotes ==
A. The goal of the season was awarded to Ahmet Brković for his bicycle kick against Bradford City on 30 October 2004.
