= 2005–06 Luton Town F.C. season =

English football club season

Luton Town
2005–06 season
- Chairman: Bill Tomlins
- Manager: Mike Newell
- Championship: Tenth
- FA Cup: Third round
- Football League Cup: Second round
- Top goalscorer: League: Steve Howard (14); All: Steve Howard (15)
- Highest home attendance: 10,248 vs Wolverhampton Wanderers (Championship, 10 September 2005)
- Lowest home attendance: 7,474 vs Crewe Alexandra (Championship, 22 November 2005)
- Average home league attendance: 9,139
| Home colours | Away colours |

The 2005–06 season was the 120th season in the history of Luton Town Football Club, and the club's 85th consecutive year in the Football League. This was the club's first season in the second tier of English football since the 1995–96 season.

Mike Newell's Luton side made a strong start to the season, topping the table after the first three games and staying in the play-off places until mid-December. However, a poor second half to the season saw Luton eventually slip down the table to finish in tenth place, albeit above more-fancied sides such as Southampton and Leicester City. Striker Steve Howard was Luton's top goalscorer for the fifth season running, scoring 15 goals in total, despite playing parts of the campaign as a makeshift centre-back following injuries to most of the Luton defence. Indeed, this proved a common occurrence throughout the season, with Luton's relatively small squad forcing team members to play out of position when injuries or suspensions materialised.

Kenilworth Road was expanded at the beginning of the season to accommodate over 700 more fans and, combined with the large away followings of clubs such as Leeds United, Norwich City and Wolverhampton Wanderers, this saw the highest average attendance for Luton since their relegation from the top division in the 1991–92 season.

This article covers the period from 1 July 2005 to 30 June 2006.

== Background ==
The 2004–05 season had seen Luton promoted to the second tier of English football, winning the League One title with 98 points and both the most goals scored and fewest goals conceded. Six Luton players had been named in the Team of the Year, with 20-year-old centre-back Curtis Davies being named League One Player of the Year. Key players Sol Davis, Kevin Nicholls, Ahmet Brković and Steve Howard had all agreed contract extensions with the club in the face of transfer speculation, while squad players Lee Mansell and David Bayliss had been released.

== Review ==
=== July and August ===
Wrexham's Trinidad and Tobago international winger Carlos Edwards joined Luton on a free transfer on 1 July. The club released utility player Alan Neilson and long-term injured defender Ian Hillier the same day. On 4 July, Luton signed Rowan Vine on a three-year contract from Portsmouth for £250,000. Vine had spent the previous season on a year-long loan at Luton, playing in 49 games.

The club began pre-season with a mini-tournament in Bulgaria, losing to Bulgarian champions CSKA Sofia, and drawing with Cypriot Second Division club APEP. A day after returning to England, the club signed Aberdeen's Finnish international defender Markus Heikkinen and Reading forward Dean Morgan on free transfers. Both Heikkinen and Morgan signed two-year contracts. Young striker Calvin Andrew joined League Two club Grimsby Town on loan for a month on 4 August.

Luton began their season on 6 August with a 2–1 away win to recently relegated Crystal Palace, with Steve Howard and Ahmet Brković scoring, and captain Kevin Nicholls uncharacteristically missing a penalty. After the game, Luton manager Mike Newell reacted to comments in the Crystal Palace match programme that had suggested the game would be Luton's "cup final". Newell stated that "I do not expect to read condescending comments from fellow professionals." Three days later, Luton beat another side just relegated from the Premier League, winning 3–2 against Southampton at Kenilworth Road. New signing Dean Morgan scored the winning goal in stoppage time. A 0–0 home draw with Leeds United was followed a week later with a 2–1 defeat to Stoke City in which Steve Howard was sent off for spitting at Carl Hoefkens. Howard received a three-game ban after Luton's appeal was rejected.

The club progressed into the second round of the League Cup with a 3–1 win over Leyton Orient on 23 August. Luton won their third league game on 27 August, Ahmet Brković scoring a bicycle kick and Kevin Nicholls a penalty to secure victory over Leicester City.

Luton was close to signing Ghana an international midfielder Anthony Obodai from Ajax during the month, but the move fell through on 28 August due to complications with his visa.

Warren Feeney scored his first Luton goal in a 2–1 home victory against Millwall on 29 August to put Luton into third position in the table. Defender Curtis Davies scored the other goal in what would prove to be his last game in a Luton shirt; on 31 August, transfer deadline day, Davies moved to Premier League side West Bromwich Albion for a fee of £3 million – both a Luton and West Brom record in terms of money received and spent respectively. Midfielder Michael Leary moved to Bristol Rovers on a one-month loan the same day.

=== September and October ===
Luton drew 1–1 at home to title favourites Wolverhampton Wanderers on 10 September, Kevin Nicholls scoring a late goal, and then lost 1–0 to Queens Park Rangers three days later for their second defeat of the season. A 1–0 win over Hull City came on 17 September, followed by a 2–2 draw with Sheffield Wednesday a week later. Steve Howard scored all three of Luton's goals. In between these two league games, Luton lost 1–0 to Reading in the League Cup. Luton ended the month with an impressive 3–0 win over the previous season's play-off finalists Preston North End to sit in third place in the table, drawing praise from Preston manager Billy Davies. Midfielder Kevin Nicholls won the Championship's Player of the Month award for his performances.

The club beat Cardiff City 2–1 at Ninian Park on 1 October, midfielder Peter Holmes scoring one goal and setting up another. Bottom-of-the-table Crewe Alexandra beat Luton 3–1 on 15 October, but the club bounced back a few days later to defeat Norwich City 4–2 and return to their almost customary third place in the table. Plymouth Argyle scored a stoppage-time equaliser to deny Luton a win on 22 August, and the club then lost their fourth league game a week later, going down 1–0 at Coventry City.

Off the field, Luton loaned out youth player Thomas Ward to Dagenham & Redbridge, midfielder Stephen O'Leary to Tranmere Rovers, and Calvin Andrew for a second spell at Grimsby Town.

=== November and December ===
On 1 November, chairman Bill Tomlins announced that the club had changed its plans to build a new stadium near to Junction 10 of the M1 motorway, after being told the site would not be viable if Luton Airport was to earn permission to build a new runway. Instead, the owners began exploring the possibility of building a new stadium in time for the 2008–09 season near Junction 12 – almost six miles away from their existing home of Kenilworth Road. Manager Mike Newell exhibited the first signs of a strained relationship with the club's board, criticising the lack of direction from the owners and stating that "[the owners] have been in 18 months, so why has it taken them 18 months to find out they can't build a stadium at Junction 10?"

The club lost three consecutive matches against Sheffield United (0–4), Burnley (2–3), and Norwich City (0–2) through early to mid-November, pushing them down the table to seventh place. Luton then beat Crewe Alexandra 4–1 and Crystal Palace 2–0, their ninth and tenth wins of the season, to end November in fifth position in the table. The club loaned out reserve goalkeeper Dino Seremet to League One club Doncaster Rovers for a month on 24 November.

Luton won just one of their six league games throughout December, pushing them out of the play-off positions, which they would not return to for the rest of the season. A heavy loss to leaders Reading on 3 December was followed up with narrow defeats to Southampton and Stoke City. A 1–1 draw on Boxing Day at Derby County was trailed by a 3–0 victory over strugglers Brighton & Hove Albion two days later. The club then lost 1–0 to Ipswich Town on New Year's Eve to drop to tenth in the table.

== Match results ==
Luton Town results given first.

All results, goals, attendances etc. taken from Soccerbase and verified with match reports from LutonFC.com.

=== Legend ===
| Win | Draw | Loss |

=== Friendlies ===
| Date | Opponent | Venue | Result | Attendance | Scorers | Notes |
|---|---|---|---|---|---|---|
| 17 July 2005 | CSKA Sofia | Away | 2–3 | Unknown | Howard (2) | |
| 19 July 2005 | APEP | Neutral | 1–1 | Unknown | Robinson | |
| 27 July 2005 | OFK Belgrade | Home | 2–2 | 2,026 | Howard (2) | |
| 28 July 2005 | Aylesbury United | Away | 5–2 | Unknown | Leary, Morgan (2), Showunmi, own goal | |
| 30 July 2005 | Stevenage Borough | Away | 2–1 | Unknown | Underwood, Brković | |
| 1 August 2005 | Hitchin Town | Away | 2–1 | 1,034 | Perrett, Vine | |
| 4 August 2005 | Hemel Hempstead Town | Away | 2–1 | Unknown | Richardson, Sinclair (pen) | Luton Town XI |

=== Football League Championship ===
| Date | Opponent | Venue | Result | Attendance | Scorers | Notes |
|---|---|---|---|---|---|---|
| 6 August 2005 | Crystal Palace | Away | 2–1 | 21,166 | Howard, Brković | |
| 9 August 2005 | Southampton | Home | 3–2 | 9,447 | Nicholls, Brković, Morgan | |
| 13 August 2005 | Leeds United | Home | 0–0 | 10,102 | – | |
| 20 August 2005 | Stoke City | Away | 1–2 | 18,653 | Morgan | |
| 27 August 2005 | Leicester City | Away | 2–0 | 22,048 | Brković, Nicholls (pen) | |
| 29 August 2005 | Millwall | Home | 2–1 | 8,220 | Feeney, Davies | |
| 10 September 2005 | Wolverhampton Wanderers | Home | 1–1 | 10,248 | Nicholls | |
| 13 September 2005 | Queens Park Rangers | Away | 0–1 | 13,492 | – | |
| 17 September 2005 | Hull City | Away | 1–0 | 19,184 | Howard | |
| 23 September 2005 | Sheffield Wednesday | Home | 1–1 | 8,267 | Howard (2) | |
| 27 September 2005 | Preston North End | Home | 3–0 | 7,815 | Feeney, Brković, Howard | |
| 1 October 2005 | Cardiff City | Away | 2–1 | 14,657 | Morgan, Holmes | |
| 15 October 2005 | Crewe Alexandra | Away | 1–3 | 6,604 | Morgan | |
| 18 October 2005 | Norwich City | Home | 4–2 | 10,248 | Feeney, Edwards, Holmes, Howard | |
| 22 October 2005 | Plymouth Argyle | Home | 1–1 | 8,714 | Feeney | |
| 29 October 2005 | Coventry City | Away | 0–1 | 22,228 | – | |
| 1 November 2005 | Sheffield United | Away | 0–4 | 22,554 | – | |
| 5 November 2005 | Burnley | Home | 2–3 | 8,518 | Howard, Feeney | |
| 19 November 2005 | Norwich City | Away | 0–2 | 25,383 | – | |
| 22 November 2005 | Crewe Alexandra | Home | 4–1 | 7,474 | Vine (2, 1 pen), Morgan, Showunmi | |
| 26 November 2005 | Crystal Palace | Home | 2–0 | 10,248 | Heikkinen, Vine | |
| 3 December 2005 | Reading | Away | 0–3 | 19,478 | – | |
| 11 December 2005 | Southampton | Away | 0–1 | 19,086 | – | |
| 17 December 2005 | Stoke City | Home | 2–3 | 8,296 | Brković, Nicholls (pen) | |
| 26 December 2005 | Derby County | Away | 1–1 | 26,807 | Brković | |
| 28 December 2005 | Brighton & Hove Albion | Home | 3–0 | 9,429 | Howard, Feeney, Robinson | |
| 31 December 2005 | Ipswich Town | Away | 0–1 | 23,957 | – | |
| 2 January 2006 | Watford | Home | 1–2 | 10,248 | Edwards | |
| 13 January 2006 | Wolverhampton Wanderers | Away | 1–2 | 21,823 | Howard | |
| 21 January 2006 | Queens Park Rangers | Home | 2–0 | 9,797 | Heikkinen, Howard | |
| 31 January 2006 | Sheffield Wednesday | Away | 2–0 | 23,965 | Nicholls (pen), Vine | |
| 4 February 2006 | Hull City | Home | 2–3 | 8,835 | Keane, Coyne | |
| 11 February 2006 | Preston North End | Away | 1–5 | 15,237 | own goal | |
| 14 February 2006 | Cardiff City | Home | 3–3 | 7,826 | Vine (2), own goal | |
| 17 February 2006 | Reading | Home | 3–2 | 8,705 | Vine (2), Morgan | |
| 25 February 2006 | Leeds United | Away | 1–2 | 23,644 | Howard | |
| 4 March 2006 | Millwall | Away | 1–2 | 9,871 | Coyne | |
| 11 March 2006 | Leicester City | Home | 1–2 | 9,783 | Howard | |
| 18 March 2006 | Derby County | Home | 1–0 | 9,163 | Howard | |
| 25 March 2006 | Brighton & Hove Albion | Away | 1–1 | 7,139 | Robinson | |
| 1 April 2006 | Ipswich Town | Home | 1–0 | 9,820 | Howard | |
| 9 April 2006 | Watford | Away | 1–1 | 15,922 | Brković | |
| 15 April 2006 | Coventry City | Home | 1–2 | 8,752 | own goal | |
| 17 April 2006 | Plymouth Argyle | Away | 2–1 | 13,486 | Vine, Andrew | |
| 22 April 2006 | Sheffield United | Home | 1–1 | 10,248 | Brković | |
| 30 April 2006 | Burnley | Away | 1–1 | 12,743 | Vine | |

=== FA Cup ===
| Round | Date | Opponent | Venue | Result | Attendance | Scorers | Notes |
|---|---|---|---|---|---|---|---|
| Third round | 7 January 2006 | Liverpool | Home | 3–5 | 10,170 | Howard, Robinson, Nicholls (pen) | |

=== Football League Cup ===
| Round | Date | Opponent | Venue | Result | Attendance | Scorers | Notes |
|---|---|---|---|---|---|---|---|
| First round | 23 August 2005 | Leyton Orient | Away | 3–1 | 2,383 | Coyne, Feeney, own goal | |
| Second round | 20 September 2005 | Reading | Away | 0–1 | 6,941 | – | |

== League table ==
| Pos | Team | Pld | W | D | L | GF | GA | GD | Pts |
|---|---|---|---|---|---|---|---|---|---|
| 8 | Coventry City | 46 | 16 | 15 | 15 | 62 | 65 | −3 | 63 |
| 9 | Norwich City | 46 | 18 | 8 | 20 | 56 | 65 | −9 | 62 |
| 10 | Luton Town | 46 | 17 | 10 | 19 | 66 | 67 | −1 | 61 |
| 11 | Cardiff City | 46 | 16 | 12 | 18 | 58 | 59 | −1 | 60 |
| 12 | Southampton | 46 | 13 | 19 | 14 | 49 | 50 | −1 | 58 |

Updated to match(es) played on 2 December 2011. Source: RSSSF
Rules for classification: 1) points; 2) goal difference; 3) number of goals scored.

== Player statistics ==
Last match played on 30 April 2006. Players with a zero in every column appeared either as unused substitutes or were assigned squad numbers.

| No. | Pos. | Name | League | | FA Cup | | League Cup | | Total | | Discipline | |
| No. | Pos. | Name | Apps | Goals | Apps | Goals | Apps | Goals | Apps | Goals | Yellow card | Red card |
|---|---|---|---|---|---|---|---|---|---|---|---|---|
| 1 | GK | (England) Marlon Beresford | 41 | 0 | 1 | 0 | 1 | 0 | 43 | 0 | 1 | 1 |
| 2 | DF | (Republic of Ireland) Kevin Foley | 35 (3) | 0 | 1 | 0 | 0 | 0 | 36 (3) | 0 | 4 | 0 |
| 3 | DF | (England) Sol Davis | 17 (4) | 0 | 0 | 0 | 2 | 0 | 19 (4) | 0 | 5 | 1 |
| 4 | DF | (Australia) Chris Coyne | 28 (2) | 2 | 1 | 0 | 2 | 1 | 31 (2) | 3 | 5 | 0 |
| 5 | DF | (England) Russell Perrett | 9 (2) | 0 | 0 | 0 | 0 (1) | 0 | 9 (3) | 0 | 1 | 1 |
| 6 | DF/MF | (England) Paul Underwood | 28 (1) | 0 | 1 | 0 | 0 | 0 | 29 (1) | 0 | 2 | 0 |
| 7 | MF | (Trinidad and Tobago) Carlos Edwards | 38 (4) | 2 | 1 | 0 | 2 | 0 | 41 (4) | 2 | 1 | 0 |
| 8 | MF | (England) Kevin Nicholls | 31 (1) | 5 | 1 | 1 | 2 | 0 | 34 (1) | 6 | 6 | 1 |
| 9 | FW | (England) Rowan Vine | 21 (10) | 10 | 1 | 0 | 0 | 0 | 22 (10) | 10 | 5 | 0 |
| 10 | FW | (Northern Ireland) Warren Feeney | 29 (13) | 6 | 0 (1) | 0 | 2 | 1 | 31 (14) | 7 | 2 | 0 |
| 11 | MF | (Northern Ireland) Steve Robinson | 26 | 2 | 1 | 1 | 0 | 0 | 27 | 3 | 3 | 0 |
| 14 | MF | (England) Michael Leary | 0 | 0 | 0 | 0 | 1 | 0 | 1 | 0 | 1 | 0 |
| 15 | MF | (Republic of Ireland) Stephen O'Leary | 0 | 0 | 0 | 0 | 0 (1) | 0 | 0 (1) | 0 | 0 | 0 |
| 16 | FW | (Nigeria) Enoch Showunmi | 15 (26) | 1 | 0 (1) | 0 | 1 | 0 | 16 (27) | 1 | 2 | 0 |
| 17 | MF | (England) Paul Hughes | 0 | 0 | 0 | 0 | 0 | 0 | 0 | 0 | 0 | 0 |
| 18 | MF | (Croatia) Ahmet Brković | 39 (3) | 8 | 1 | 0 | 1 | 0 | 41 (3) | 8 | 5 | 0 |
| 19 | FW | (England) Steve Howard | 40 (3) | 14 | 1 | 1 | 1 | 0 | 42 (3) | 15 | 8 | 1 |
| 20 | DF | (England) Curtis Davies | 6 | 1 | 0 | 0 | 1 | 0 | 7 | 1 | 2 | 0 |
| 21 | MF | (Republic of Ireland) Keith Keane | 5 (5) | 1 | 0 | 0 | 1 (1) | 0 | 6 (6) | 1 | 1 | 0 |
| 22 | MF | (England) Danny Stevens | 0 (1) | 0 | 0 | 0 | 0 | 0 | 0 (1) | 0 | 0 | 0 |
| 23 | FW | (England) Dean Morgan | 25 (11) | 6 | 0 | 0 | 2 | 0 | 27 (11) | 6 | 1 | 0 |
| 25 | GK | (Slovenia) Dino Seremet | 6 (1) | 0 | 1 | 0 | 0 | 0 | 8 (1) | 0 | 1 | 0 |
| 26 | DF | (Finland) Markus Heikkinen | 38 (1) | 2 | 1 | 0 | 0 | 0 | 39 (1) | 2 | 6 | 0 |
| 27 | MF | (England) Peter Holmes | 16 (7) | 2 | 0 | 0 | 1 (1) | 0 | 17 (8) | 2 | 2 | 0 |
| 28 | MF | (Republic of Ireland) David Bell | 2 (7) | 0 | 0 | 0 | 0 | 0 | 2 (7) | 0 | 0 | 0 |
| 29 | FW | (England) Calvin Andrew | 0 (1) | 1 | 0 | 0 | 0 | 0 | 0 (1) | 1 | 0 | 0 |
| 33 | GK | (England) Dean Brill | 5 | 0 | 0 | 0 | 1 | 0 | 6 | 0 | 0 | 0 |
| 45 | DF | (England) Leon Barnett | 12 (8) | 0 | 0 (1) | 0 | 1 | 0 | 13 (9) | 0 | 4 | 0 |
| 47 | GK | (England) Rob Beckwith | 0 | 0 | 0 | 0 | 0 | 0 | 0 | 0 | 0 | 0 |

== Managerial statistics ==
Only competitive games from the 2005–06 season are included.

| Name | Nat. | From | To | Record | | | | | | | Honours |
| Name | Nat. | From | To | PLD | W | D | L | GF | GA | W% | Honours |
|---|---|---|---|---|---|---|---|---|---|---|---|
| Mike Newell | (England) | 23 June 2003 | 15 March 2007 | 49 | 18 | 10 | 21 | 72 | 74 | 36.7 | |

== Awards ==
Awarded on 23 April 2006.

| Award | Name | No. | Pos. | Notes |
|---|---|---|---|---|
| Supporters' Player of the Season | (Finland) Markus Heikkinen | 26 | DF | |
| Players' Player of the Season | (Finland) Markus Heikkinen | 26 | DF | |
| Website Player of the Season | (Finland) Markus Heikkinen | 26 | DF | |
| Young Player of the Season | (Republic of Ireland) Keith Keane | 21 | MF | |
| Young Members' Player of the Season | (Trinidad and Tobago) Carlos Edwards | 7 | MF | |
| Special Achievement Award | (Scotland) Steve Howard | 19 | FW | ^{[A]} |
| Goal of the Season | (England) Dean Morgan | 23 | FW | ^{[B]} |

== Transfers ==
=== In ===
| Date | Player | From | Fee | Ref. |
|---|---|---|---|---|
| 1 July 2005 | (Trinidad and Tobago) Carlos Edwards | Wrexham | Free | |
| 4 July 2005 | (England) Rowan Vine | Portsmouth | £250,000 | |
| 22 July 2005 | (Finland) Markus Heikkinen | Aberdeen | Free | |
| 22 July 2005 | (England) Dean Morgan | Reading | Free | |
| 12 January 2006 | (Republic of Ireland) David Bell | Rushden & Diamonds | £100,000 | |

=== Out ===
| Date | Player | To | Fee | Ref. |
|---|---|---|---|---|
| 1 July 2005 | (Wales) Ian Hillier | Released | | |
| 1 July 2005 | (Wales) Alan Neilson | Released | | |
| 31 August 2005 | (England) Curtis Davies | West Bromwich Albion | £3,000,000 | |
| 31 May 2006 | (England) Rob Beckwith | Released | | |
| 31 May 2006 | (England) Paul Hughes | Released | | |
| 31 May 2006 | (Slovenia) Dino Seremet | Released | | |
| 12 June 2006 | (Nigeria) Enoch Showunmi | Bristol City | Free | |

=== Loans out ===
| Date | Player | To | End date | Ref. |
|---|---|---|---|---|
| 4 August 2005 | (England) Calvin Andrew | Grimsby Town | 4 September 2005 | |
| 31 August 2005 | (England) Michael Leary | Bristol Rovers | 12 December 2005 | |
| 14 October 2005 | (England) Thomas Ward | Dagenham & Redbridge | 14 November 2005 | |
| 21 October 2005 | (Republic of Ireland) Stephen O'Leary | Tranmere Rovers | 21 April 2006 | |
| 26 October 2005 | (England) Calvin Andrew | Grimsby Town | 26 November 2005 | |
| 24 November 2005 | (Slovenia) Dino Seremet | Doncaster Rovers | 17 December 2005 | |
| 1 January 2006 | (Slovenia) Dino Seremet | Tranmere Rovers | 18 March 2006 | |
| 6 January 2006 | (England) Michael Leary | Walsall | 1 May 2006 | |
| 30 January 2006 | (England) Calvin Andrew | Bristol City | 6 April 2006 | |
| 26 March 2006 | (England) Rob Beckwith | Chesterfield | 1 May 2006 | |

== See also ==
- List of Luton Town F.C. seasons

== Footnotes ==
A. The Special Achievement Award went to Steve Howard for scoring his 100th goal for Luton Town during the season.
B. The goal of the season was awarded to Dean Morgan for his 25-yard curling shot in the final minute of Luton's 3–2 win against Southampton on 9 August 2005.
