= 2002–03 Luton Town F.C. season =

English football club season

Luton Town
2002–03 season
- Chairman: Mike Watson-Challis (until 20 May 2003); John Gurney (from 20 May 2003)
- Manager: Joe Kinnear (until 23 May 2003); Mike Newell (from 23 June 2003)
- Football League Second Division: Ninth
- FA Cup: Second round
- Football League Cup: Second round
- Football League Trophy: Southern Section Quarter-Final
- Top goalscorer: League: Steve Howard (22); All: Steve Howard (23)
- Highest home attendance: 9,477 vs Queens Park Rangers (Football League Second Division, 23 November 2002)
- Lowest home attendance: 2,578 vs Cambridge United (Football League Trophy, 10 December 2002)
- Average home league attendance: 6,746
Home colours	Away colours	Third colours

The 2002–03 season was the 117th season in the history of Luton Town Football Club. The club's promotion from the Third Division in the previous season meant they competed back in the Second Division, their 82nd consecutive year in the Football League. Luton finished in ninth place, though a poor late run of games prevented the club from reaching the play-offs.

After almost three seasons of financial security, the first signs of a new wave of problematic cracks began to appear in the club's infrastructure during the season, triggering a series of events which would eventually result in disastrous consequences. John Gurney's highly controversial takeover of the club in May and subsequent sacking of popular managerial duo Joe Kinnear and Mick Harford led to the establishment of a Supporters' Trust to protect the future of the club. A bizarre and farcical phone-vote poll organised by Gurney proved to be the method of picking a new manager to replace Kinnear, with ex-Hartlepool United boss and former Luton player Mike Newell allegedly winning the most votes on 23 June.

This article covers the period from 1 July 2002 to 30 June 2003.

== Background ==
Joe Kinnear, appointed manager on 8 February 2001, had revived Luton's fortunes the previous season. A series of transfers had seen a complete turnaround in playing staff, making the squad unrecognisable from the one relegated from the Second Division two seasons previously. The team comfortably won promotion from the Third Division at the first attempt with the squad Kinnear had built, finishing as runners-up with 97 points and also ending the season as top scorers in the division. A key component of the squad, left winger Matthew Taylor, had been sold to Portsmouth for £400,000 at the end of the season.

In June 2002 Kinnear signed Tony Thorpe, who had scored 55 goals for Luton in a previous seven-year stint spanning 1992 to 1999, on a free transfer from Bristol City, whilst Northern Ireland international midfielder Steve Robinson was bought from Preston North End for £50,000.

== Review ==
=== Pre-season ===
Very few transfer dealings were completed during pre-season, with key players having already signed contract extensions at the end of the previous season. Stuart Douglas, Richard Dryden, Adam Locke, Daryl Murphy and Scott Ward were all released, while four youth team players were given three-year scholar contracts, including Leon Barnett and Dean Brill. Jean-Louis Valois, a key player in the previous season, refused the offer of a new contract and left the club on 2 August to join Scottish Premier League club Hearts. Defender Alan Kimble, released from Wimbledon in the summer, signed a one-year contract with the club one week before the season started and, on 10 August, striker Robbie Winters signed a short-term deal from Scottish club Aberdeen.

=== August and September ===
The opening games saw Luton fall to four losses and a draw, conceding 13 goals, before claiming a first victory in a 3–0 win over Chesterfield, though this still left the club near the bottom of the table. Robbie Winters left the club after just one game – a 3–2 loss to Peterborough United. Left-back Sol Davis was signed from Swindon Town for a fee of £60,000 on 16 August, and goalkeeper Ben Roberts, who had previously had a loan spell at Luton in 2000, signed on a one-month loan from Charlton Athletic a week later.

September yielded an improvement in form as Luton finished the month two points above the relegation zone with eleven games played. Steve Howard continued his form from the previous season, netting seven goals in that time. On 10 September, Luton faced arch-rivals Watford in the League Cup – the first meeting between the two clubs in four years. In a game marred by violence between both sets of fans, Luton ran out 2–1 winners over the Hornets with goals from Matthew Spring, who scored a 25-yard strike that would later win Luton's Goal of the Season award, and Steve Howard. Luton were drawn to face Premier League side Aston Villa in the Second Round.

=== October and November ===
A goalkeeping injury crisis saw the arrival of Frenchman Cédric Berthelin on a two-month contract from Ligue 1 side Lens on 2 October. Berthelin was named in the squad on the same day as the League Cup game at Aston Villa, which Luton lost 3–0. He played in nine league games throughout October and November as Luton recorded five victories and three draws, with a single loss coming against Northampton Town. This left the Hatters just outside the play-off positions on goal difference.

Luton eased past Guiseley 4–0 in the FA Cup and recorded victories over Woking and Stevenage Borough in the Football League Trophy to reach the quarter-finals. The club were drawn against Cambridge United in the quarter-final of the Trophy, while Wigan Athletic were to be Luton's opponents in the Second Round of the FA Cup.

=== December and January ===
Goalkeeper Cédric Berthelin was offered a contract until the end of the season in late November. However, Joe Kinnear was later informed that, unless he trimmed his squad down, there would be no funds available to sign Berthelin or any other players. Kinnear admitted he was shocked at the sudden lack of money, which was partly due to the collapse of former Football League broadcaster ITV Digital, but made it clear that no players would be sold. This promise was affirmed later that day, with top scorer Steve Howard signing a two-year contract extension. Berthelin signed for First Division side Crystal Palace later that month.

A severely depleted Luton side was knocked out of the FA Cup on 7 December by Wigan and then, three days later, Cambridge United beat Luton 2–1 in extra time in the Football League Trophy. In the league, Luton recorded a loss, a draw and two wins to end December in sixth place in the table.

A loss to Chesterfield on New Year's Day turned out to be Luton's last game for almost three weeks due to poor weather. On 17 January, Kinnear revealed he had turned down the offer of an interview for the job of Irish national team manager. The next day, Luton beat Barnsley 3–2, despite being a goal down and having goalkeeper Carl Emberson sent off in the first half. A victory over Wycombe Wanderers a week later left Luton just outside the play-offs, though with games in hand over the teams above them.

Defender Chris Willmott, who started his career at Luton, joined the club on an initial month's loan from Wimbledon to ease a defensive injury crisis.

Meanwhile, developments off the pitch regarding a new stadium continued. Chairman Mike Watson-Challis revealed that he had bought a 55-acre (220,000 m^{2}) piece of land off of Junction 10 of the M1 motorway close to Luton Airport. He estimated the cost of building a 15,000 seater stadium and complex to be £15 million, though admitted there "may be other costs". The meeting where Watson-Challis revealed these details also referenced potential hindrances to the developments – the removal of electricity pylons sitting on the land, the plans to widen the M1 at the same location as the stadium was to be built, and the vital fact that the development was yet to receive support from either Luton Borough Council or the Highways Agency.

=== February, March and April ===
On 7 February, striker Andrew Fotiadis, who had played for Luton all his career, was given a free transfer to Peterborough United. This freed up the funds to allow Kinnear to add to the squad; however, the player he wanted to sign, Australian striker Danny Allsopp, was injured on 8 February. Canadian international goalkeeper Lars Hirschfeld joined Luton on a one-month loan on 21 February from Tottenham Hotspur. He was an unused substitute as Luton lost their sixth home game of the season to Brentford a day later, severely denting their play-off hopes. One week later, with regular right-back Emmerson Boyce requiring surgery, Luton secured defender Duncan Jupp on a free transfer from Notts County on a contract until the end of the season. Only one win in six games followed in March, making automatic promotion almost impossible.

Chris Willmott's loan was extended to the end of the season in order to cover for various injuries on 13 March. Three days later, Kinnear released three youth players – Joe Deeney, Rob Gillman and James Osborn. Midfielder Lee Mansell, who had been a regular player in the team during Luton's relegation season two years previously, joined Football Conference club Nuneaton Borough on loan until the end of the season on 23 March. Later on the same day, Luton signed Reading midfielder Sammy Igoe on loan for the rest of the season. Luton picked up just three points from four matches in the first half of April, mathematically ruling them out of a play-off position and ensuring only a mid-table finish was possible.

On 21 April, the club's deputy chairman Eric Hood released a statement signalling the board's intention to have the new stadium, which was still yet to receive planning permission, built for the start of the 2005–06 season.

Luton's next game saw them emphatically beat Colchester United 5–0 away from home, Steve Howard scoring a hat-trick. The game saw youth team goalkeeper Rob Beckwith make his second appearance for the club. Kinnear admitted that the lack of available funds would likely see "seven or eight" players leaving the club in May, though stressed his desire to sign Willmott and Igoe on permanent contracts.

A 1–1 draw with Stockport County on 26 April left Luton in a mid-table position with one game left to play.

=== May ===
The season ended with a defeat to Swindon Town on 3 May, leaving Luton in ninth place in the table and fourteen points behind the play-offs. Young midfielder Michael Leary signed a two-year contract extension on 5 May.

A summer of turmoil at the club began on 20 May with chairman Mike Watson-Challis, who owned the land that the club was intending to build a new stadium on, retiring and an unknown consortium taking over the ownership of the club. Three days later the club announced that both Joe Kinnear and assistant manager Mick Harford had left the club, with no immediate reason given for their departures. An outpouring of confusion and anger from supporters forced a press conference from the new owners to reveal their identities. However, the proposed new chairman Roger Terrell and vice-chairman Lee Power admitted they had nothing to do with the investors nor the takeover process, confusing the situation further. They both confessed that, after seeing the reaction from the supporters of Luton, they were considering resigning after only one week. It was also during this press conference that some of Luton's financial difficulties were exposed, with a cut to the wage bill and other parts of the club necessary to fund the new stadium venture. To compound this, it was announced that Luton would not be renewing the contracts of six players – goalkeepers Carl Emberson and Mark Ovendale, defenders Duncan Jupp, Alan Kimble and Aaron Skelton, and striker Carl Griffiths were all released.

The new owners, still yet to be revealed, announced on 30 May that the process of finding a new manager would be handled through a phone-vote process, with supporters choosing their preferred candidate from a shortlist – a first of its kind in sport.

=== June ===
On 1 June, Roger Terrell and Lee Power released a statement which specified that they were severing any association with Luton Town, and wanted no involvement with the consortium. Two days later, the club revealed that a man named Peter Miller had been responsible for the removal of Joe Kinnear and Mick Harford from their jobs. It would later come to light that this was the same Peter Miller who was under employment at nearby club Northampton Town, breaching Football Association rules that state no single person can have an interest in more than one club. Stranger still, it was disclosed that Luton had entered into negotiations to re-hire Joe Kinnear and Mick Harford. Meanwhile, the FA commenced an investigation into Miller's actions.

With the situation at the club becoming more outlandish by the day, media reports highlighted businessman and property developer John Gurney as the man behind the takeover bid. It was later picked up that Gurney had previous history with leaving sports teams in dire financial situations, including non-League football clubs Farnborough Town and Southall, and rugby union club Bedford Blues, which alerted Luton supporters to the fact that their club could be inflicted with a similar fate. Gurney made his ownership public on 8 June and released two documents outlining his plans for the club. Within them, he defined his vision to build a Formula One track around a 50,000-seater stadium with a removable pitch that was supported over the top of the M1 motorway on concrete rafters, claimed the club could be making up to £100 million profit per year, and that it should change its name to 'London-Luton Football Club' to tie in with the local airport and make it more accessible to "customers" living in London. Gurney ended the documents with a plea for investors. Trust in Luton chairman Liam Day would later state that "if [the situation] wasn't so serious, it would have been hilarious." Gurney also raised the possibility of Luton merging with Wimbledon, a club over 40 miles away who were themselves in a poor financial state, in order to secure a position in the league above.

This uncertainty and the distinct possibility of liquidation for Luton Town, which was revealed to be losing £500,000 per month, in addition to the proposed destruction of the club's history, led to a group of supporters establishing a supporters' trust – Trust in Luton – to protect the future of the club and to give fans a unified voice to protest against the takeover. The Trust successfully convinced many supporters to vote with their feet and refuse to buy season tickets for the 2003–04 campaign, provoking a series of enraged statements from Gurney that were published in full on the club's website. The situation even went as far as UK Parliament, with Luton South MP Margaret Moran receiving support from Minister for Sport Richard Caborn to find a solution to the circumstances at the club.

On 23 June, Gurney announced the results from the phone-vote to find the next manager. He delayed the announcement for a re-count, as the results had allegedly been "so close". The eventual winner was revealed as former Hartlepool United manager and Luton player Mike Newell, who beat former manager Joe Kinnear by a reported four votes. However, it is widely believed that Kinnear won the vote by a significant margin, but refused to work with Gurney and turned the job down as a result. Newell expressed his desire to re-hire Mick Harford, who he had played with during his time at Luton, as assistant manager.

To make matters worse, on 26 June, it was revealed that none of the players or staff at the club had been paid their wages for May and June, which led to Gurney being summoned for a meeting with the Football League to explain the situation.

== Match results ==
Luton Town results given first.

=== Legend ===
Win	Draw	Loss

=== Friendlies ===
Date	Opponent	Venue	Result	Attendance	Scorers	Notes
17 July 2002	Barnet	Away	1–1	1,095	Crowe	
22 July 2002	Wrexham	Neutral	2–3	N/A	Kinet, Robinson	^{[A]}
23 July 2002	Burnley	Neutral	3–1	N/A	Howard (2), Bayliss	^{[A]}
26 July 2002	Rochdale	Neutral	4–2	N/A	Crowe, Nicholls (2), Forbes	^{[A]}
5 August 2002	Southampton	Home	3–2	4,746	Thorpe, Fotiadis, Holmes	

=== Football League Second Division ===
All results, goals, attendances etc. taken from Soccerbase and verified with official Luton Town match reports.

Date	Opponent	Venue	Result	Attendance	Scorers	Notes
10 August 2002	Peterborough United	Home	2–3	7,860	Crowe, Brkovic	
13 August 2002	Blackpool	Away	2–5	6,377	Howard, Thorpe	
17 August 2002	Plymouth Argyle	Away	1–2	10,978	Howard	
24 August 2002	Barnsley	Home	2–3	6,230	Nicholls (pen), Spring	
26 August 2002	Cardiff City	Away	0–0	13,564	–	
31 August 2002	Chesterfield	Home	3–0	6,060	Perrett, Howard, Crowe	
7 September 2002	Brentford	Away	0–0	7,145	–	
14 September 2002	Notts County	Home	2–2	6,456	Perrett, Howard	
17 September 2002	Mansfield Town	Home	2–3	6,004	Howard, Nicholls	
21 September 2002	Huddersfield Town	Away	1–0	9,249	Howard	
28 September 2002	Swindon Town	Home	3–0	6,393	Howard, Fotiadis, Robinson (pen)	
5 October 2002	Stockport County	Away	3–2	5,932	Spring (2), Fotiadis	
12 October 2002	Cheltenham Town	Home	2–1	6,447	Coyne, Fotiadis	
19 October 2002	Oldham Athletic	Away	2–1	6,916	Fotiadis, Thorpe	
26 October 2002	Wigan Athletic	Home	1–1	7,364	Skelton	
29 October 2002	Crewe Alexandra	Away	1–0	6,030	Howard	
2 November 2002	Northampton Town	Away	0–3	5,750	–	
9 November 2002	Port Vale	Home	0–0	6,112	–	
23 November 2002	Queens Park Rangers	Home	0–0	9,477	–	
30 November 2002	Tranmere Rovers	Away	3–1	8,273	Spring, Brkovic, Howard	
14 December 2002	Colchester United	Home	1–2	5,890	Fotiadis	
21 December 2002	Bristol City	Away	1–1	14,057	Howard	
26 December 2002	Cardiff City	Home	2–0	7,805	Thorpe, Howard	
28 December 2002	Wycombe Wanderers	Away	2–1	7,740	Howard (2)	
1 January 2003	Chesterfield	Away	1–2	4,638	Brkovic	
18 January 2003	Barnsley	Away	3–2	9,079	Spring, Thorpe (2)	
25 January 2003	Wycombe Wanderers	Home	1–0	7,351	Spring	
1 February 2003	Peterborough United	Home	1–1	6,760	Howard	
8 February 2003	Port Vale	Away	2–1	4,714	Thorpe, Nicholls (pen)	
11 February 2003	Blackpool	Home	1–3	6,563	Thorpe	
15 February 2003	Northampton Town	Home	3–2	7,048	Hughes (2), Nicholls	
22 February 2003	Brentford	Home	0–1	6,940	–	
25 February 2003	Plymouth Argyle	Home	1–0	7,589	Thorpe	
1 March 2003	Notts County	Away	1–2	6,778	Thorpe	
4 March 2003	Mansfield Town	Away	2–3	4,829	Thorpe (2)	
8 March 2003	Huddersfield Town	Home	3–0	6,122	Thorpe, Holmes, Howard	
15 March 2003	Wigan Athletic	Away	1–1	7,087	Howard	
18 March 2003	Oldham Athletic	Home	0–0	6,142	–	
22 March 2003	Crewe Alexandra	Home	0–4	6,607	–	
5 April 2003	Tranmere Rovers	Home	0–0	6,326	–	
8 April 2003	Cheltenham Town	Away	2–2	3,762	Hughes, Forbes	
12 April 2003	Queens Park Rangers	Away	0–2	15,786	–	
19 April 2003	Bristol City	Home	2–2	6,381	Howard (2)	
21 April 2003	Colchester United	Away	5–0	3,967	Howard (3), Griffiths, Nicholls (pen)	
26 April 2003	Stockport County	Home	1–1	6,010	Howard	
3 May 2003	Swindon Town	Away	1–2	6,455	Thorpe	

=== FA Cup ===
Round	Date	Opponent	Venue	Result	Attendance	Scorers	Notes
First round	16 November 2002	Guiseley	Home	4–0	5,248	Spring, Brkovic (2), Thorpe	
Second round	7 December 2002	Wigan Athletic	Away	0–3	4,544	–	

=== Football League Cup ===
Round	Date	Opponent	Venue	Result	Attendance	Scorers	Notes
First round	10 September 2002	Watford	Away	2–1	14,171	Spring, Howard	
Second round	2 October 2002	Aston Villa	Away	0–3	20,833	–	

=== Football League Trophy ===
Round	Date	Opponent	Venue	Result	Attendance	Scorers	Notes
First round	22 October 2002	Woking	Away	2–0	1,216	Holmes, Deeney	
Second round	12 November 2002	Stevenage Borough	Away	4–3	2,601	Thorpe, Brkovic (3)	
Quarter-final	10 December 2002	Cambridge United	Home	1–2 (aet)	2,578	Thorpe	

== League table ==
Pos	Team	Pld	W	D	L	GF	GA	GD	Pts
7	Tranmere Rovers	46	23	11	12	66	57	+9	80
8	Plymouth Argyle	46	17	14	15	63	52	+11	65
9	Luton Town	46	17	14	15	67	62	+5	65
10	Swindon Town	46	16	12	18	59	63	−4	60
11	Peterborough United	46	14	16	16	51	54	−3	58

Rules for classification: In the Football League goals scored (GF) takes precedence over goal difference (GD).

== Player statistics ==
Last match played on 3 May 2003. Players with a zero in every column only appeared as unused substitutes.

No.	Pos.	Name	League		FA Cup		League Cup		FL Trophy		Total		Discipline	
No.	Pos.	Name	Apps	Goals	Apps	Goals	Apps	Goals	Apps	Goals	Apps	Goals	Yellow card	Red card
1	GK	(England) Mark Ovendale	5 (1)	0	0	0	0	0	2	0	7 (1)	0	0	0
2	DF	(England) Aaron Skelton	5 (3)	1	0	0	0	0	1	0	6 (3)	1	0	0
3	DF	(Wales) Alan Neilson	21 (5)	0	1 (1)	0	0 (2)	0	0	0	22 (8)	0	2	0
4	MF	(England) Matthew Spring	41	6	2	1	2	1	1	0	47	8	10	0
5	DF	(England) Russell Perrett	19 (1)	2	1	0	2	0	0	0	22 (1)	2	6	0
6	DF	(England) Marvin Johnson	0	0	0	0	0	0	1 (1)	0	1 (1)	0	0	0
7	MF	(England) Adrian Forbes	3 (2)	1	0	0	0	0	0	0	3 (2)	1	0	1
8	MF	(England) Kevin Nicholls	35 (1)	5	1	0	1	0	1	0	38 (1)	5	10	1
9	FW	(England) Tony Thorpe	28 (2)	13	1	1	0	0	2	2	31 (2)	16	5	0
10	FW	(Wales) Carl Griffiths	3	1	0	0	0	0	0	0	3	1	1	0
11	MF	(Northern Ireland) Steve Robinson	23 (6)	1	2	0	1 (1)	0	1	0	27 (7)	1	4	0
12	DF	(Australia) Chris Coyne	38 (2)	1	2	0	1	0	1	0	42 (2)	0	6	1
14	FW	(England) Andrew Fotiadis	8 (9)	5	1	0	1	0	0 (1)	0	10 (10)	5	3	0
15	FW	(England) Dean Crowe	17 (10)	2	0	0	1 (1)	0	1	0	19 (11)	2	3	0
16	GK	(England) Carl Emberson	18 (2)	0	2	0	2	0	1	0	23 (2)	0	1	1
17	DF	(Barbados) Emmerson Boyce	33 (1)	0	2	0	2	0	1	0	38 (1)	0	0	0
18	MF	(Croatia) Ahmet Brković	29 (7)	3	2	2	1	0	3	3	35 (7)	8	10	0
19	FW	(Scotland) Steve Howard	41	22	1	0	2	1	0	0	44	23	13	1
20	MF	(England) Peter Holmes	8 (9)	1	1 (1)	0	1	0	2 (1)	1	12 (11)	2	1	0
21	MF	(England) Paul Hughes	30 (5)	3	1	0	2	0	2	0	35 (5)	3	6	0
23	MF	(Wales) Ian Hillier	12 (10)	0	0 (1)	0	0 (1)	0	2	0	14 (12)	0	4	0
24	DF	(England) Sol Davis	34	0	1	0	2	0	1	0	38	0	8	1
25	DF	(Scotland) Duncan Jupp	2 (3)	0	0	0	0	0	0	0	2 (3)	0	0	0
26	MF	(England) Sammy Igoe	2	0	0	0	0	0	0	0	2	0	0	0
27	DF	(England) David Bayliss	7 (6)	0	0	0	1	0	0	0	8 (6)	0	4	0
28	GK	(Canada) Lars Hirschfeld	5	0	0	0	0	0	0	0	5	0	0	0
30	FW	(Scotland) Robbie Winters	1	0	0	0	0	0	0	0	1	0	0	0
31	DF	(England) Alan Kimble	8 (4)	0	1	0	0	0	2 (1)	0	11 (5)	0	0	0
32	MF	(England) Lee Mansell	0 (1)	0	0	0	0	0	2	0	2 (1)	0	0	0
33	GK	(England) Rob Beckwith	4	0	0	0	0	0	0	0	4	0	0	0
34	GK	(England) Ben Roberts	5	0	0	0	0	0	0	0	5	0	0	0
35	GK	(France) Cédric Berthelin	9	0	0	0	0	0	0	0	9	0	0	0
36	DF	(England) Rob Gillman	0	0	0	0	0	0	0	0	0	0	0	0
37	DF	(England) Chris Willmott	12 (1)	0	0	0	0	0	0	0	12 (1)	0	0	0
38	MF	(England) Michael Leary	0	0	0	0	0	0	1 (1)	0	1 (1)	0	1	0
39	MF	(Republic of Ireland) Stephen O'Leary	0	0	0	0	0	0	0	0	0	0	0	0
40	FW	(England) James Osborn	0	0	0	0	0	0	1	0	1	0	0	0
41	DF	(Republic of Ireland) Kevin Foley	0 (2)	0	0	0	0	0	1 (1)	0	1 (3)	0	0	0
42	DF	(England) Joe Deeney	0	0	0	0	0	0	2	1	2	1	0	0
43	FW	(England) Matthew Judge	0 (1)	0	0 (1)	0	0	0	1 (1)	0	1 (3)	0	0	0
44	GK	(England) Dean Brill	0	0	0	0	0	0	0	0	0	0	0	0
45	DF	(England) Leon Barnett	0	0	0	0	0	0	0 (1)	0	0 (1)	0	0	0
46	MF	(England) Parys Okai	0	0	0	0	0	0	0 (1)	0	0 (1)	0	0	0

== Managerial statistics ==
Only competitive games from the 2002–03 season are included.

Name	Nat.	From	To	Record							Honours
Name	Nat.	From	To	PLD	W	D	L	GF	GA	W%	Honours
Joe Kinnear	(Republic of Ireland)	8 February 2001	23 May 2003	53	21	14	18	80	74	39.6	

== Awards ==
Awarded on 4 May 2003.

Award	Name	No.	Pos.	Notes
Player of the Season	(Australia) Chris Coyne	12	DF	
Players' Player of the Season	(Scotland) Steve Howard	19	FW	
Young Player of the Season	(Republic of Ireland) Kevin Foley	41	DF	
Young Members' Player of the Season	(England) Tony Thorpe	9	FW	
Goal of the Season	(England) Matthew Spring	4	MF	^{[B]}

== Transfers ==
=== In ===
Date	Player	From	Fee	Ref.
2 August 2002	(England) Alan Kimble	Wimbledon	Free	
10 August 2002	(Scotland) Robbie Winters	Aberdeen	Free	
16 August 2002	(England) Sol Davis	Swindon Town	£60,000	
2 October 2002	(France) Cédric Berthelin	Lens	Free	
28 February 2003	(Scotland) Duncan Jupp	Notts County	Free	

=== Out ===
Date	Player	To	Fee	Ref.
25 July 2002	(England) Stuart Douglas	Boston United	Free	
25 July 2002	(England) Richard Dryden	Scarborough	Free	
25 July 2002	(England) Adam Locke	Hornchurch	Free	
25 July 2002	(Republic of Ireland) Daryl Murphy	Waterford United	Free	
25 July 2002	(England) Scott Ward	Chesham United	Free	
2 August 2002	(France) Jean-Louis Valois	Hearts	Free	
12 August 2002	(Scotland) Robbie Winters	Brann	Free	
2 December 2002	(France) Cédric Berthelin	Crystal Palace	Free	
7 February 2003	(England) Andrew Fotiadis	Peterborough United	Free	
16 March 2003	(England) Joe Deeney	Enfield	Free	
16 March 2003	(England) Rob Gillman	Released		
16 March 2003	(England) James Osborn	Hitchin Town	Free	
22 May 2003	(England) Carl Emberson	Released		
22 May 2003	(Wales) Carl Griffiths	Released		
22 May 2003	(Scotland) Duncan Jupp	Southend United	Free	
22 May 2003	(England) Alan Kimble	Released		
22 May 2003	(England) Mark Ovendale	Released		
22 May 2003	(England) Aaron Skelton	Released		

=== Loans in ===
Date	Player	From	End date	Ref.
23 August 2002	(England) Ben Roberts	Charlton Athletic	20 September 2002	
31 January 2003	(England) Chris Willmott	Wimbledon	3 May 2003	
21 February 2003	(Canada) Lars Hirschfeld	Tottenham Hotspur	19 March 2003	
27 March 2003	(England) Sammy Igoe	Reading	3 May 2003	

=== Loans out ===
Date	Player	To	End date	Ref.
27 March 2003	(England) Lee Mansell	Nuneaton Borough	4 May 2003	

== See also ==
- List of Luton Town F.C. seasons

== Footnotes ==
A. Game part of the Isle of Man Tournament.
B. The goal of the season was awarded as Matthew Spring's 25-yard strike against Watford on 10 September 2002.
