= Dean Brill =

English footballer (born 1985)

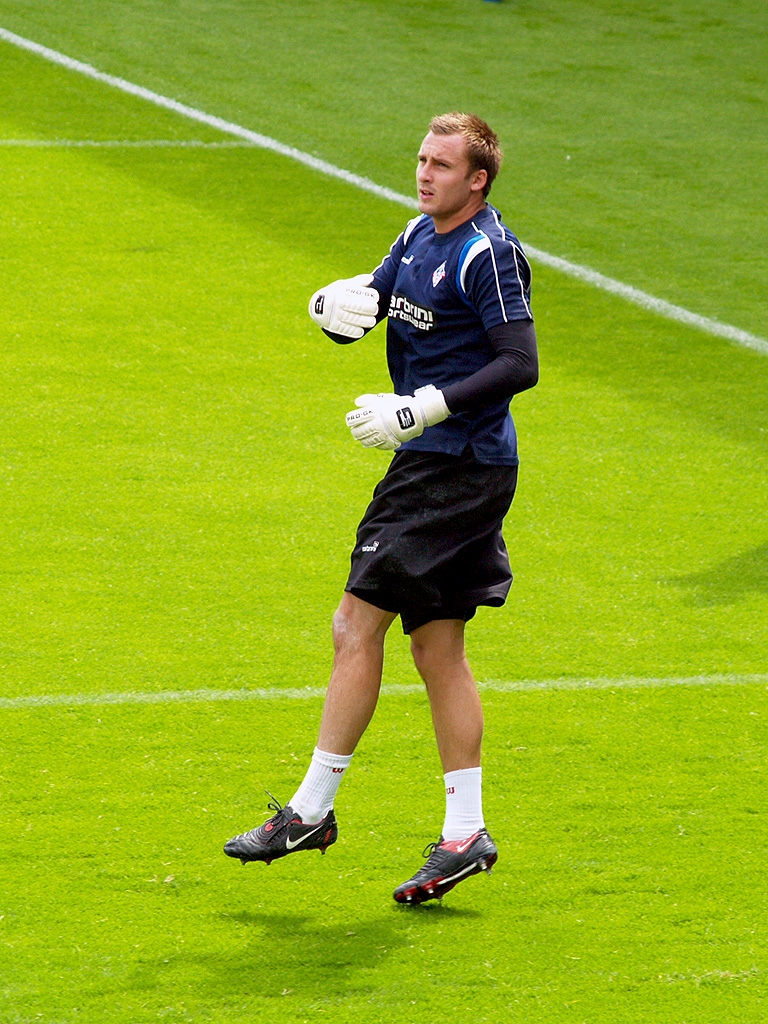
- Brill training with Oldham Athletic in 2009

Personal information
- Full name: Dean Michael Brill
- Date of birth: 2 December 1985 (age 40)
- Place of birth: Luton, England
- Height: 6 ft 2 in (1.88 m)
- Position: Goalkeeper

Team information
- Current team: Tottenham Hotspur (goalkeeping coach)

Youth career
- 1995–2003: Luton Town

Senior career*
Years	Team	Apps	(Gls)
2003–2009	Luton Town	81	(0)
2006–2007	→ Gillingham (loan)	8	(0)
2009–2011	Oldham Athletic	58	(0)
2011–2012	Barnet	36	(0)
2012–2013	Luton Town	7	(0)
2013	→ Inverness Caledonian Thistle (loan)	12	(0)
2013–2016	Inverness Caledonian Thistle	49	(0)
2016–2017	Motherwell	0	(0)
2017	Colchester United	0	(0)
2017–2020	Leyton Orient	89	(0)
Total		340	(0)

Managerial career
- 2017: Leyton Orient (caretaker)
- * Club domestic league appearances and goals

Dean Michael Brill (born 2 December 1985) is an English former professional footballer who played as a goalkeeper and is now a coach at Tottenham Hotspur.

== Playing career ==
=== Luton Town ===
Born in Luton, Bedfordshire, Brill joined Luton at the age of nine, progressing through the Centre of Excellence and representing Luton Schools and Bedfordshire County Schools at various age groups. His abilities alerted the attention of bigger clubs, including Liverpool, but Luton fought off the competition to secure his signature.

Beginning 2003–04 as understudy to Rob Beckwith, Brill made his league debut as a substitute in a 3–0 defeat away to Oldham Athletic, after Beckwith had been sent off. His full league debut came three weeks later in a 3–1 win at home to Wycombe Wanderers and retained his place for the following two matches, a 1–0 win away to Stevenage Borough in the Football League Trophy and a 4–2 defeat away to Brentford.

With regular goalkeeper Marlon Beresford unavailable, Brill began 2005–06 as the number one goalkeeper, impressing against newly relegated Crystal Palace during a 2–1 victory at Selhurst Park on the opening day of the season.

Brill made his first appearance of 2006–07 as a substitute in a 3–0 defeat away to Preston North End. His first starting appearance of the season came in a 3–2 defeat at home to Queens Park Rangers, where he deputised for the suspended Beresford. However, following the loan signing of Dean Kiely from Portsmouth, Brill was pushed down to third-choice goalkeeper and in December 2006, he was loaned to League One club Gillingham. He made eight appearances during a month-long stay. Having made 12 first-team appearances for Luton, Brill was named Young Player of the Season at Luton's end of season awards.

At the beginning of the 2007–08, Brill found himself out of favour after the loan signings of David Forde and Ben Alnwick. However, after Luton went into administration in November 2007, manager Kevin Blackwell was unable to sign a new goalkeeper on loan, and Brill was recalled to the first-team. He finished the season with 47 appearances, culminating in relegation to League Two.

Brill started the first four matches of 2008–09, with Luton facing an almost impossible task to overcome a 30-point deduction. Brill finished the season with 25 appearances and started in Luton's 2009 Football League Trophy Final victory over Scunthorpe United at Wembley Stadium. The points deduction proved too much to overcome and Luton were relegated for the third successive season, dropping into the Conference Premier. Brill was released by the club on 27 May 2009 following the expiration of his contract.

=== Oldham Athletic ===
On 1 July 2009, Brill signed a two-year contract with League One club Oldham Athletic. He was released by the club in May 2011.

=== Barnet ===
After trials at Yeovil Town and Barnet, Brill signed for the latter on a one-year contract. He kept a clean sheet on his debut in a 1–0 win away to Morecambe. Brill made a crucial save in the dying seconds of Barnet's 2–1 win away to Burton Albion on the final day of 2011–12, a result which kept the club in Football League at the expense of Hereford United. He was released by the club in May 2012.

=== Return to Luton Town ===
After spending three weeks on trial during pre-season with former club Luton Town, who were in the Conference Premier, Brill signed a two-year contract with them on 31 July 2012. He made 12 appearances in 2012–13, but was transfer-listed by the club in April 2013.

=== Inverness Caledonian Thistle ===
In July 2013, Brill signed on loan for Inverness Caledonian Thistle until January 2014. He debuted on the opening day of 2013–14 in a 3–0 win at home to St Mirren, keeping his first of three consecutive clean sheets. After a successful spell on loan, Brill signed a permanent deal with Inverness in November 2013, after Luton agreed to release him from the remainder of his contract.

Between May and September 2014, Brill did not let a single goal in, enabling Inverness to achieve a club record of 616 minutes without conceding a goal. Later in the season, Brill suffered an injury which kept him out for a few matches. Worse was to follow, as he sustained a dislocated knee only minutes into his comeback game. This prevented him making any first-team appearances in 2015–16 and he was released by the club in May 2016.

=== Motherwell ===
Brill signed for Scottish Premiership club Motherwell on 27 June 2016 on a one-year contract. He left the club on 27 January 2017, having failed to make an appearance.

=== Colchester United ===
On 31 January 2017, Brill signed for Colchester United on a contract until the end of 2016–17. He left the club at the end of his contract after failing to make a first-team appearance.

=== Leyton Orient ===
Brill joined newly relegated National League club Leyton Orient as a goalkeeping coach on 3 August 2017. Following Steve Davis' sacking as head coach on 14 November, Brill was named interim head coach alongside Ross Embleton. After Justin Edinburgh was appointed head coach later that month, Brill became a member of the playing staff, making his debut for the club on 2 December in a 1–0 away defeat to Solihull Moors. He signed a two-year contract extension in February 2018 after he kept five clean sheets in 14 appearances up to that point in 2017–18. He finished the season with 29 appearances for Leyton Orient and was replaced as goalkeeping coach in July, allowing him to focus on his playing career. The following season, Brill was ever-present in league competition and kept 24 clean sheets in all competitions, equalling the club record, as Leyton Orient won the National League title and promotion to League Two. Ahead of the 2019–20 season, Brill signed a one-year contract extension with the club. After making 20 appearances in the first half of the season, with 19 of those appearances coming in the league, he sustained an injury in late December 2019 and announced his retirement from playing on 24 January 2020 to rejoin the club's coaching staff.

== Coaching career ==
Dean Brill was originally appointed goalkeeping coach at Leyton Orient on 3 August 2017 and interim head coach on 14 November before returning to playing. He was appointed first-team coach at Leyton Orient in January 2020 and head of goalkeeping in July 2020. He left Orient in June 2021 to become a goalkeeping coach at Tottenham Hotspur's academy where he became head of academy goalkeeping in July 2022. In July 2025, Brill was promoted to first team assistant goalkeeping coach.

== Career statistics ==
Appearances and goals by club, season and competition
Club	Season	League			National cup		League cup		Other		Total	
Club	Season	Division	Apps	Goals	Apps	Goals	Apps	Goals	Apps	Goals	Apps	Goals
Luton Town	2003–04	Second Division	5	0	0	0	0	0	2 (Note: Appearance(s) in Football League Trophy)	0	7	0
Luton Town	2004–05	League One	0	0	0	0	0	0	0	0	0	0
Luton Town	2005–06	Championship	5	0	0	0	1	0	—		6	0
Luton Town	2006–07	Championship	11	0	1	0	0	0	—		12	0
Luton Town	2007–08	League One	37	0	5	0	3	0	2	0	47	0
Luton Town	2008–09	League Two	23	0	0	0	1	0	1	0	25	0
Luton Town	Total		81	0	6	0	5	0	5	0	97	0
Gillingham (loan)	2006–07	League One	8	0	—		—		—		8	0
Oldham Athletic	2009–10	League One	28	0	0	0	1	0	1	0	30	0
Oldham Athletic	2010–11	League One	30	0	1	0	1	0	1	0	33	0
Oldham Athletic	Total		58	0	1	0	2	0	2	0	63	0
Barnet	2011–12	League Two	36	0	2	0	2	0	5	0	45	0
Luton Town	2012–13	Conference Premier	7	0	1	0	—		4 (Note: Appearances in FA Trophy)	0	12	0
Inverness Caledonian Thistle	2013–14	Scottish Premiership	37	0	4	0	4	0	—		45	0
Inverness Caledonian Thistle	2014–15	Scottish Premiership	24	0	2	0	1	0	—		27	0
Inverness Caledonian Thistle	2015–16	Scottish Premiership	0	0	0	0	0	0	—		0	0
Inverness Caledonian Thistle	Total		61	0	6	0	5	0	—		72	0
Motherwell	2016–17	Scottish Premiership	0	0	0	0	0	0	—		0	0
Colchester United	2016–17	League Two	0	0	—		—		—		0	0
Leyton Orient	2017–18	National League	24	0	0	0	—		5	0	29	0
Leyton Orient	2018–19	National League	46	0	1	0	—		7	0	54	0
Leyton Orient	2019–20	League Two	19	0	0	0	1	0	0	0	20	0
Leyton Orient	Total		89	0	1	0	1	0	12	0	103	0
Career total			340	0	17	0	15	0	28	0	400	0

== Honours ==
Luton Town

- Football League Trophy: 2008–09

Inverness Caledonian Thistle

- Scottish Cup: 2014–15
- Scottish League Cup runner-up: 2013–14

Leyton Orient

- National League: 2018–19
- FA Trophy runner-up: 2018–19

Individual

- Luton Town Young Player of the Season: 2006–07
- National League Team of the Year: 2018–19
