= Peter Holmes (footballer) =

English footballer (born 1980)

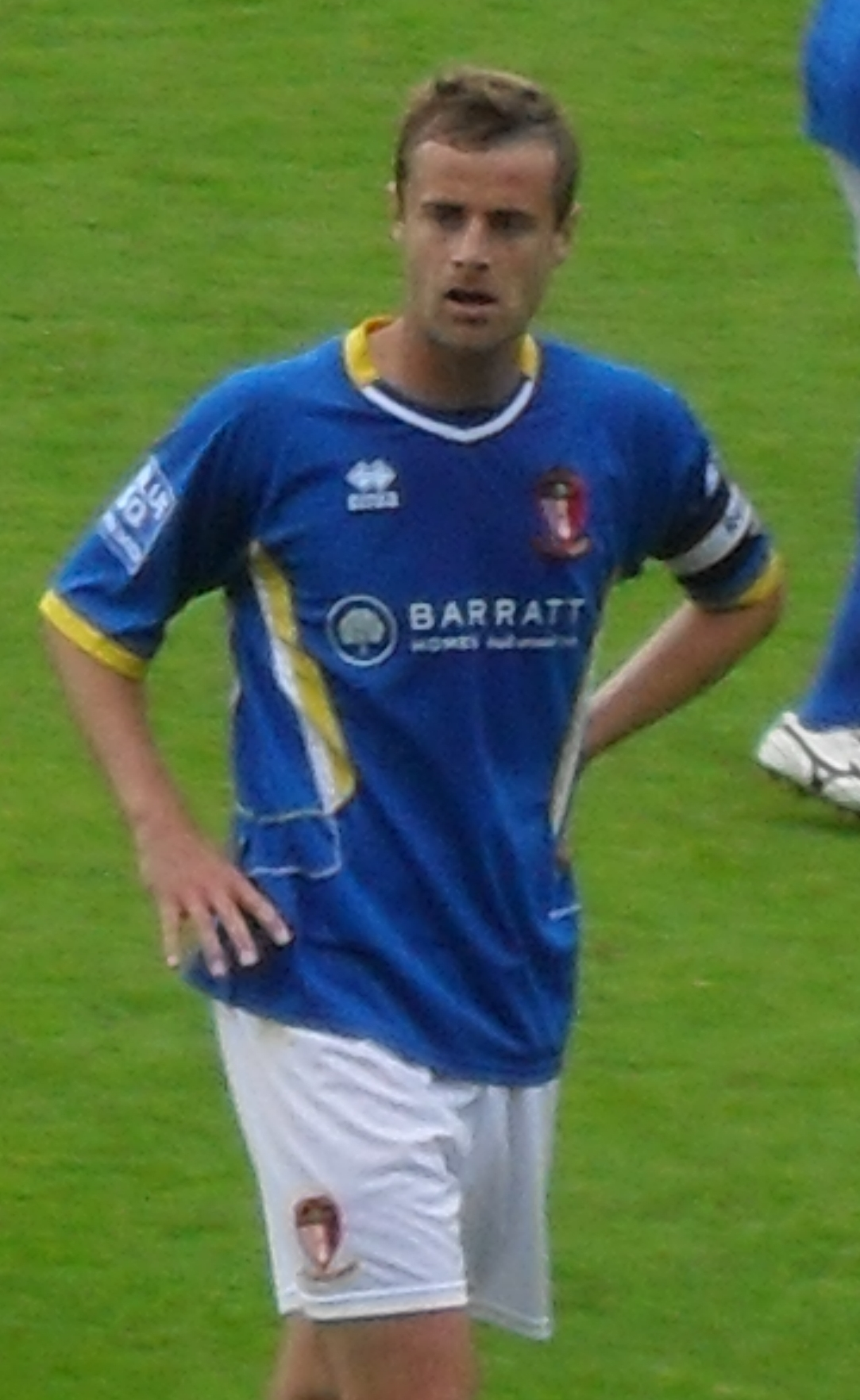
- Holmes playing for Hayes & Yeading United in 2010

Personal information
- Full name: Peter James Holmes
- Date of birth: 18 November 1980 (age 45)
- Place of birth: Bishop Auckland, England
- Height: 5 ft 11 in (1.80 m)
- Position: Midfielder

Team information
- Current team: Hayes & Yeading United (assistant manager)

Youth career
- –1999: Sheffield Wednesday

Senior career*
Years	Team	Apps	(Gls)
1999–2000	Sheffield Wednesday	0	(0)
2000–2007	Luton Town	105	(11)
2007	→ Chesterfield (loan)	10	(1)
2007	→ Lincoln City (loan)	5	(0)
2007–2009	Rotherham United	27	(2)
2008	→ York City (loan)	5	(1)
2009	Harrogate Town	0	(0)
2009–2010	Ebbsfleet United	28	(2)
2010–2011	Hayes & Yeading United	44	(3)
2011–2012	Dunstable Town	37	(14)
2012–2013	Hemel Hempstead Town	21	(1)
2018	Hayes & Yeading United	0	(0)
Total		282	(35)

International career
1996–1997	England U16	4	(0)
- * Club domestic league appearances and goals

Peter James Holmes (born 18 November 1980) is an English former professional footballer who played as a midfielder. He played in the Football League for Luton Town, Chesterfield, Lincoln City and Rotherham United. He is the assistant manager at Isthmian League South Central Division club Hayes & Yeading United.

Holmes started his career with Sheffield Wednesday and after failing to make any first-team appearances he joined Luton Town. He was released by the club due to financial reasons in the summer of 2003, but was eventually handed a new contract in November. After being loaned out to Chesterfield and Lincoln City during the 2006–07 season, Holmes left Luton, having made over 100 appearances for the club. He was signed by Rotherham United, who loaned him out to Conference Premier club York City in 2008. He was released by Rotherham in 2009 and was signed by Harrogate Town, before joining Ebbsfleet United. Following Ebbsfleet's relegation, he signed for Hayes & Yeading United.

== Club career ==
=== Sheffield Wednesday and Luton Town ===
Peter Holmes was Born in Bishop Auckland, County Durham, Holmes graduated through The Football Association's School of Excellence. He started his career with Premier League club Sheffield Wednesday as a trainee in their youth system before signing a professional contract on 2 December 1997, and was promoted to the first team for the 1999–2000 season. After failing to appear for the team, Holmes was signed by Luton Town on 1 August 2000 on a three-year contract for a nominal fee. Luton manager Ricky Hill had been impressed by the player while working as a coach at Wednesday. Holmes made his debut for Luton after being introduced as a 58th-minute substitute in a 1–0 defeat at home to Notts County in the Second Division on 12 August 2000. He scored his first goal for Luton with their second goal in a 3–2 home victory over Peterborough United on 26 December 2000, and played his final match of 2000–01 at Oldham Athletic on 23 January 2001, where he was substituted for Liam George in the 55th minute. He was transfer listed in April 2001 by manager Joe Kinnear and completed his first season at the club with 22 appearances and one goal, after which Luton were relegated to the Third Division.

Holmes suffered from soreness in his leg after collapsing in a match against Rushden & Diamonds in December 2001. He returned to action to score from the edge of the penalty area in a 3–1 away victory against Swansea City on 30 March 2002; this goal secured Luton's promotion to the Second Division at the first attempt. Holmes' 2001–02 season was ended with 10 appearances and one goal after suffering a knee ligament injury during Luton's 4–0 victory at Hull City on 6 April 2002. He suffered a groin strain during the 2–1 home defeat to Cambridge United in the Football League Trophy on 10 December 2002. He made his return to Luton's first team in a 3–2 away defeat to Mansfield Town on 4 March 2003 after coming on as a 74th-minute substitute. He then scored in the following match against Huddersfield Town, being assisted by an Ian Hillier cross in the 71st minute to help Luton to a 3–0 victory on 8 March 2003. He finished 2002–03 with 23 appearances and two goals, but missed Luton's final match of the season after picking up a hamstring injury during a 1–1 draw with Stockport County on 26 April 2003.

Holmes was released by Luton in July 2003 after the offer of a new contract was withdrawn because of financial difficulties at the club, but he continued to train with the team and eventually signed a contract in November. His first appearance of the season came after starting in Luton's 0–0 draw at Holmes' former club Sheffield Wednesday, before scoring his first goal on 10 January 2004 with a header in a 2–2 draw with Rushden & Diamonds. Holmes was the oldest central midfielder in the team after starting in the FA Cup match against Tranmere Rovers, due to other players being injured, during which he gave away the possession for Micky Mellon to score the winner for Tranmere in the 81st minute. He finished 2003–04 with 20 appearances and scored three goals. Luton won promotion to the Championship in 2004–05 after winning the League One title, while Holmes made 20 appearances and scored three goals. Following this achievement, he signed a new one-year contract with the club in June 2005.

The winning goal for Luton in a 2–1 victory over Cardiff City in October was scored by Holmes from close range, which brought an end to the opposition' eight match unbeaten run. He suffered from a twisted knee during a match against Derby County on 26 December 2005, eventually returning to action from a hamstring injury in February 2006 by playing in a reserve match against Southend United. His competitive return was in a 3–3 draw against Cardiff, where he came on as a substitute for Dean Morgan on 82 minutes. He completed 2005–06 with 25 appearances and scored two goals, when Luton finished 10th in the Championship. Following the conclusion of the season, he signed a new one-year contract in June 2006. He joined League One club Chesterfield on a one-month loan on 12 January 2007, making his debut the following day in a 1–0 away victory over Rotherham United, in which he forced goalkeeper Neil Cutler into making a good save. Chesterfield were given the lead by Holmes in a match away to Huddersfield Town with a header from a Kyle Critchell cross, which eventually finished a 1–1 draw. The loan was extended for a second month on 8 February 2007, and Holmes said he would consider signing for the club permanently when the loan expired. He eventually finished his spell at Chesterfield with 10 appearances and scored one goal. He joined Lincoln City of League Two on loan until the end of 2006–07 on 22 March 2007. His debut came in a 3–2 home defeat to Swindon Town and he completed the loan spell with five appearances.

=== Rotherham United ===
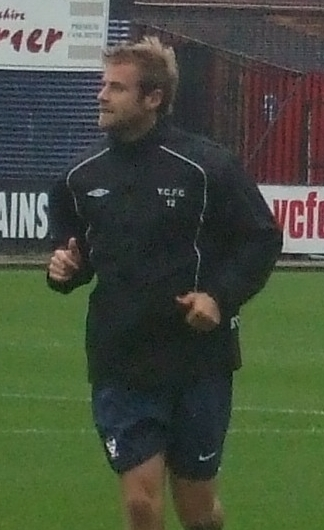
Holmes warming up for York City in 2008

Luton released Holmes on 8 May 2007 following their relegation to League One, after he had spent nearly seven years with the club. He eventually signed for Rotherham United of League Two on a two-year contract on 14 June 2007. His debut for Rotherham was in a 0–0 draw against Hereford United on 10 August 2007 and he scored his first goal for the team against Notts County on 22 September with a 25-yard shot into the far corner. Holmes finished 2007–08 with 27 appearances and two goals.

After making only one appearance during 2008–09, he joined York City in the Conference Premier on 22 September 2008 on a one-month loan and made his debut a day later in a 2–0 defeat to Kidderminster Harriers. He scored for the team in the following match with a six-yard shot from a Craig Farrell pass, which finished as a 3–3 draw with Stevenage Borough. He suffered from a hip injury, which resulted him in missing York's 3–1 defeat against Wrexham. His final match for York was a 2–0 victory against Rushden & Diamonds and he finished the loan spell with five appearances and one goal, before returning to Rotherham on 18 October 2008 after being recalled by the club. Weeks after returning to Rotherham, it was suggested that Holmes might be loaned out again after failing to break back into the team. It was over a month before Holmes eventually made his first appearance for Rotherham since returning, after starting in the 2–0 defeat at home to Bradford City on 21 November 2008.

=== Later career ===
He was released by Rotherham at the end of the season, after not being offered a new contract by the club, and he was signed by Conference North club Harrogate Town on 25 September 2009. Holmes made his first and only appearance for Harrogate in a 4–0 away defeat to Bradford Park Avenue in the FA Cup second qualifying round on 26 September 2009. He joined Conference Premier club Ebbsfleet United on 9 October 2009, making his debut a day later in a 4–0 defeat to Cambridge United. His first goal was with the winner in a 2–1 victory over Mansfield Town on 28 November 2009, scoring from close range from a Magno Vieira pass. He made 29 appearances and scored two goals for Ebbsfleet during the 2009–10 as they were relegated to the Conference South.

Holmes received a contract offer from Hayes & Yeading United in July 2010 and signed for the club on 2 August. He made his debut in the opening match of 2010–11, a 2–1 home victory over Bath City on 14 August 2010. His first goal for the club came a curling shot from a Jamie Hand assist in a 2–1 defeat at Kettering Town on 2 October 2010. Holmes finished the season with 47 appearances and five goals.

Holmes signed for Dunstable Town of the Spartan South Midlands League Premier Division in August 2011. He spent 2011–12 with Dunstable before signing for Southern League Premier Division club Hemel Hempstead Town in May 2012. He made 26 appearances in 2012–13 before joining the club's coaching staff. He joined newly relegated Southern League East Division club Hayes & Yeading United as assistant manager on 22 June 2017.

== International career ==
Holmes made his debut for the England national under-16 team in a 1–0 home defeat to France on 28 September 1996. His final appearance came in a 5–1 away defeat to Scotland on 6 March 1997, meaning he finished his England under-16 career with four caps.

== Style of play ==
Holmes was a hard-working midfielder who possessed skill and could make neat passes, although he had been criticised for lacking in physical strength and tackling. He preferred to play as a central midfielder, although was able to play on the left side of midfield and was equally comfortable playing with either foot.

== Career statistics ==
Appearances and goals by club, season and competition
Club	Season	League			FA Cup		League Cup		Other		Total	
Club	Season	Division	Apps	Goals	Apps	Goals	Apps	Goals	Apps	Goals	Apps	Goals
Luton Town	2000–01	Second Division	18	1	1	0	3	0	0	0	22	1
Luton Town	2001–02	Third Division	7	1	1	0	1	0	1 (Note: Appearance(s) in Football League Trophy)	0	10	1
Luton Town	2002–03	Second Division	17	1	2	0	1	0	3	1	23	2
Luton Town	2003–04	Second Division	16	3	3	0	0	0	1	0	20	3
Luton Town	2004–05	League One	19	3	0	0	0	0	1	0	20	3
Luton Town	2005–06	Championship	23	2	0	0	2	0	—		25	2
Luton Town	2006–07	Championship	5	0	0	0	2	0	—		7	0
Luton Town	Total		105	11	7	0	9	0	6	1	127	12
Chesterfield (loan)	2006–07	League One	10	1	—		—		—		10	1
Lincoln City (loan)	2006–07	League Two	5	0	—		—		—		5	0
Rotherham United	2007–08	League Two	24	2	1	0	1	0	1	0	27	2
Rotherham United	2008–09	League Two	3	0	0	0	0	0	1	0	4	0
Rotherham United	Total		27	2	1	0	1	0	2	0	31	2
York City (loan)	2008–09	Conference Premier	5	1	—		—		—		5	1
Harrogate Town	2009–10	Conference North	0	0	1	0	—		—		1	0
Ebbsfleet United	2009–10	Conference Premier	28	2	—		—		1 (Note: Appearance in FA Trophy)	0	29	2
Hayes & Yeading United	2010–11	Conference Premier	44	3	2	1	—		1	1	47	5
Dunstable Town	2011–12	Spartan South Midlands; League Premier Division	37	14	3	0	—		5 (Note: One appearance and two goals in Spartan South Midlands League Challenge Trophy, one appearance in FA Vase, one appearance and one goal in Spartan South Midlands League Premier Division Cup, two appearances and one goal in Bedfordshire Senior Cup)	4	45	18
Hemel Hempstead Town	2012–13	Southern League Premier Division	21	1	0	0	—		5 (Note: One appearance in FA Trophy, two in Southern League Cup, two in Herts Senior Cup)	0	26	1
Hayes & Yeading United	2017–18	Southern League East Division	0	0	0	0	—		1 (Note: Appearance in Middlesex Senior Charity Cup)	1	1	1
Career total			282	35	14	1	10	0	21	7	327	43

== Honours ==
Luton Town

- Football League One: 2004–05
