= Craig McCreeth =

Craig McCreeth is a Goalkeeping Coach from London. Craig holds the UEFA B Licence and FAW Goalkeeping B Licence and is currently the Reading FC Women Goalkeeping Coach.

Craig has previously held roles at Barnet F.C.as an academy goalkeeping coach and as First Team goalkeeping coach, taking over when Marlon Beresford left the London club to join Motherwell F.C. This appointment meant that Craig became the youngest English Football League coach. Craig was also the Academy goalkeeping coach at Watford FC before joining Reading FC Women.

== Coaching roles ==
Position	Club	Date From	Date To
First Team Goalkeeping Coach	Reading FC Women	February 2018	Present
Academy Goalkeeping Coach	Barnet FC	September 2014	July 2016
Head of Goalkeeping	London Bees	December 2014	September 2017
Academy Goalkeeping Coach	Watford FC	August 2016	February 2018
Regional Talent Centre Goalkeeping Coach	The FA	September 2016	May 2017
First Team Goalkeeping Coach	Barnet FC	March 2017	May 2017
