= Ahmet Brković =

Croatian footballer

Personal information
- Full name: Ahmet Brković
- Date of birth: 23 September 1974 (age 52)
- Place of birth: Dubrovnik, SR Croatia, SFR Yugoslavia
- Height: 5 ft 8 in (1.73 m)
- Position: Midfielder

Senior career*
Years	Team	Apps	(Gls)
1992–1997	HNK Dubrovnik	48	(4)
1997–1999	Varteks Varaždin	3	(0)
1999–2001	Leyton Orient	72	(7)
2001–2008	Luton Town	196	(31)
2007–2008	→ Millwall (loan)	25	(2)
2008–2009	Millwall	6	(1)
Total		350	(45)
- * Club domestic league appearances and goals

Ahmet Brković (born 23 September 1974) is a Croatian former footballer. His position was midfielder.

== Club career ==
Brković started off his career in 1992 for HNK Dubrovnik in Croatia. In 1998 he transferred to NK Varteks. When he was made available for transfer after military service, clubs from the Football League expressed an interest in taking him on trial. Lennie Lawrence, then manager of Luton invited him in for a trial. Although performing well, Smiler decided that Brković was not quite ready for the English game and allowed him to move on. Leyton Orient immediately signed him up. Brković stayed at Orient for the next two seasons, scoring eight goals from midfield.

In 2001, then Luton manager Joe Kinnear signed him on a free transfer after his contract with Leyton Orient expired. Under Kinnear, Brković played in a variety of positions across the midfield, despite favouring the right-hand side. His first goal came in a 1–0 away win at Torquay United and he scored his only Luton hat-trick in the Windscreens Shield against close neighbours Stevenage Borough. Brković helped them to promotion in 2004–05, the season in which he scored 15 goals from midfield. In his first season at the Championship level, he scored eight goals in 42 league games. During the 2006–07 season, he signed a new one-year deal with Luton.

On 25 October 2007, Brković joined Millwall on a month-long loan. He signed for the club permanently on 10 January 2008.

On 27 May 2009 it was announced that Brković had been released by Millwall.

During summer of 2009 he joined Croatian 4th division club Dubrovnik 1919.

== Career statistics ==
Season	Club	League	League		Cup		League Cup/Trophy		Total	
Season	Club	League	Apps	Goals	Apps	Goals	Apps	Goals	Apps	Goals
1992	Dubrovnik	1. HNL	2	0	–		–		2	0
1992–93	Dubrovnik	1. HNL	0	0	0	0	–		0	0
1993–94	Dubrovnik	1. HNL	13	0	3	0	–		16	0
1994–95	Dubrovnik	2. HNL South	–		3	1	–		3	1
1995–96	Dubrovnik	1.B HNL	23	4	4	4	–		27	8
1996–97	Dubrovnik	1.B HNL	–		3	1	–		3	1
Dubrovnik total			48	4	13	6	2	0	61	6
1997–98	Varteks Varaždin	1. HNL	3	0	2	0	–		5	0
1998–99	Varteks Varaždin	1. HNL	–		–		–		0	0
Varteks total			3	0	2	0	0	0	5	0
1999–00	Leyton Orient	Third Division	29	5	2	0	1	0	32	5
2000–01	Leyton Orient	Third Division	43	1	3	0	4	3	50	4
Leyton Orient total		Third Division	72	6	5	0	5	3	82	9
2001–02	Luton Town	Third Division	21	1	1	0	0	0	22	1
2002–03	Luton Town	Second Division	37	3	2	2	3	3	42	8
2003–04	Luton Town	Second Division	32	1	4	0	4	0	40	1
2004–05	Luton Town	League One	42	15	3	1	1	0	46	16
2005–06	Luton Town	Championship	42	8	1	0	1	0	44	8
2006–07	Luton Town	Championship	21	3	2	0	2	0	25	3
2007–08	Luton Town	League One	1	0	–		3	0	4	0
2007–08	Millwall (loan)	League One	25	2	2	1	–		27	3
Lunton Town total			196	31	13	4	13	6	222	41
2008–09	Millwall	League One	6	1	–		2	0	8	1
Millwall total			31	3	2	1	2	0	35	4
Career total			350	45	35	11	22	9	407	65
Last Update: 29 November 2018.

== Honours ==
Luton Town

- Football League One: 2004–05

Individual

- Luton Town Goal of the Season: 2004–05
- Luton Town Young Members' Player of the Season: 2004–05
- PFA Team of the Year: 2004–05 Football League
