= Keith Keane =

Irish footballer

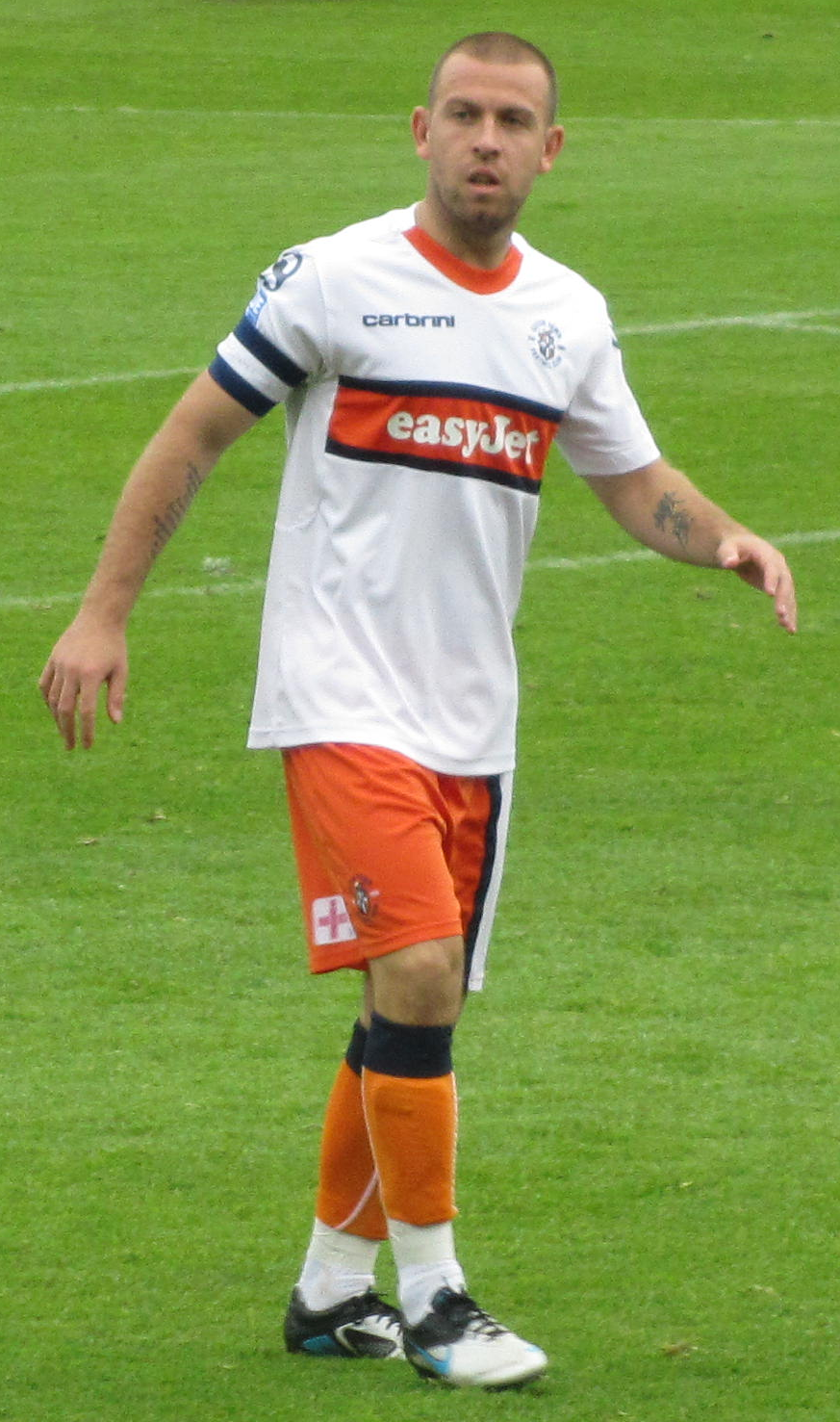
- Keane playing for Luton Town in 2011

Personal information
- Full name: Keith Francis Keane
- Date of birth: 20 November 1986 (age 39)
- Place of birth: Luton, England
- Height: 5 ft 9 in (1.75 m)
- Positions: Defender; midfielder

Team information
- Current team: The 61 FC (Luton)

Youth career
- 1995–2003: Luton Town

Senior career*
Years	Team	Apps	(Gls)
2003–2012	Luton Town	234	(7)
2012–2015	Preston North End	64	(2)
2014	→ Crawley Town (loan)	12	(0)
2015	→ Stevenage (loan)	7	(0)
2015–2017	Cambridge United	5	(0)
2016	→ Stevenage (loan)	5	(1)
2016	→ Stevenage (loan)	1	(0)
2016–2017	→ Rochdale (loan)	16	(0)
2017–2018	Rochdale	16	(0)
2021–	The 61 FC (Luton)	0	(0)

International career
2004	Republic of Ireland U19	2	(0)
2005–2007	Republic of Ireland U21	4	(0)
- * Club domestic league appearances and goals as of 23:08, 30 June 2018 (UTC)

Keith Francis Keane (born 20 November 1986) is a professional footballer who plays as a midfielder for The 61 FC (Luton). He is a former academy player who graduated from the youth ranks at Luton Town. A versatile footballer, Keane played in every position for Luton other than in goal or as a striker, and played for the club across four different divisions.

== Club career ==
=== Luton Town ===
Born in Luton, Bedfordshire, Keane made his first-team debut for Luton Town under manager Mike Newell at the age of 16, in a Football League Trophy victory against Rushden & Diamonds early in the 2003–04 season. Keane played well and stayed in the side for a further 16 games that season, his league debut coming in a 0–0 draw at Wycombe Wanderers in February 2004. Newell predominantly played Keane at right-back as cover for Kevin Foley, but he also featured in midfield. Keane scored his first goal for Luton on 17 April as a last minute winner in a 3–2 victory over Bristol City.

During the 2004–05 season, Keane became a regular squad member. Appearing at centre-back, full-back and in midfield, he made 19 appearances in all competitions. Luton went on to win the League One title that season with 98 points, rewarding Keane with a winner's medal.

With Keane now a Championship player, he was utilised at right-back, left-back, in central defence and in right midfield during the course of the 2005–06 season, which saw him make 12 appearances, scoring once. He was awarded the Young Player of the Season award that season for his performances, and was rewarded with a new two-year contract. In 2006–07, Keane made 19 league appearances, scoring one goal, as Luton were relegated to League One.

The next season, after Newell's departure, Keane was frozen out of the first-team by new manager Kevin Blackwell, who preferred to play his own new signing Richard Jackson. However, Keane was eventually brought back into the team to replace Jackson, and later made the position his own when Luton Town fan favourite Mick Harford replaced Blackwell as manager in January 2008. Harford made Keane club captain, but the price of administration condemned Luton to another relegation, this time to League Two. Keane won the Player of the Season award at the end of the season, as well as the Players' Player of the Year and Internet Player of the Season award.

Luton were docked 30 points for financial irregularities at the beginning of the 2008–09 season, and although Keane made 40 league appearances, primarily in midfield, he could not prevent the inevitable as Luton were relegated from the Football League for the first time in 89 years. Some solace could be found as Luton beat Scunthorpe United 3–2 in the 2009 Football League Trophy final at Wembley Stadium, with Keane producing a superb performance in midfield. His displays earned Keane the Player of the Season and Internet Player of the Season awards for the second year in a row.

Keane playing for Luton Town in 2011

On 15 January 2010, Keane was placed on the transfer list at Luton. His refusal to sign a new contract, which would expire in June 2010 and effectively mean he would leave the club on a free transfer, was cited as the reason. However, the January transfer window closed with no bids for the player received. Then-Luton manager Richard Money stated the club was in negotiations with Keane over a new contract regardless of his transfer status, calling him a "talisman" to Luton. On 9 February 2010, Keane scored direct from a corner kick in the last minute of the game, his first goal in over two years, to earn Luton a dramatic 2–1 win against then-league leaders Oxford United. He was subsequently shown a red card for a second bookable offence after celebrating the goal with the Luton fans. This goal later won Luton Town's Goal of the Season award as voted for by fans.

Keane dismissed any speculation as to his Luton future by signing a new two-year contract with the club on 9 June 2010. Keane played the full 120 minutes of the 2011 Conference Premier play-off final against AFC Wimbledon in May 2011; a game that saw Luton miss out on a return to the Football League by losing the penalty shoot-out.

League One club Stevenage, then managed by Graham Westley, made two bids for Keane in August 2011, though both were rejected. Defensive injuries meant Keane was moved back into defence at the beginning of the 2011–12 season, with two performances described by manager Gary Brabin as "outstanding". Keane went on to make 42 appearances on what turned out to be his final season at Kenilworth Road.

=== Preston North End ===
On 7 June 2012, it was announced that he was to join League One club Preston North End, then managed by Graham Westley, once his Luton contract had finished. He scored his first goal for the club on 29 March 2013 in a 1–1 draw at home to Portsmouth. On 17 December, Keane extended his contract with Preston for a further twelve months, thus keeping him at the club until the summer of 2015.

On 9 September 2014, Keane joined League One club Crawley Town on a three-month loan deal. He made a successful debut on 13 September when Crawley earned a 1–0 win at home to Fleetwood Town, in which he was named the man of the match. He returned to Preston having made 15 appearances in all competitions for Crawley.

On 5 March 2015, Keane was loaned to League Two club Stevenage on a one-month loan deal. He made his debut for the club two days later as a 59th-minute substitute for Chris Beardsley in a 2–1 win at home to Newport County. Keane made seven appearances for Stevenage during his loan spell, which was cut short due to a shoulder injury and returned to Preston on 26 April. He was released by the club at the end of the season.

=== Cambridge United ===
On 27 May 2015, it was announced that Keane had signed a two-year contract with League Two club Cambridge United, linking up with former Luton manager Richard Money. He made his Cambridge debut on the opening day of the 2015–16 season in a 3–0 win at home to Newport County. However, injuries restricted Keane's playing time and he rejoined Stevenage on loan on 14 January 2016 until 20 February. He made five appearances, scoring one goal during his initial loan spell, before returning on another one-month loan deal on 25 March.

=== Rochdale ===
On 31 August 2016, Keane joined League One club Rochdale on loan until 2 January 2017. He made his debut as a 76th-minute substitute for Callum Camps in a 2–2 draw away to Bristol Rovers on 10 September. Keane finished his loan spell with 17 appearances, before joining Rochdale permanently on a one-and-a-half-year contract a day later, after leaving Cambridge by mutual consent. He was released by Rochdale at the end of the 2017–18 season.

=== The 61 ===
In August 2021, after three years out from football, Keane joined tenth tier Spartan South Midlands Division Two side The 61 FC (Luton).

== International career ==
Keane was called up by Sean McCaffrey to play for the Republic of Ireland under-19 team in February 2004 for two friendlies against Slovenia. In October 2005, Keane received his first call-up to the Republic of Ireland under-21 team for a 2006 UEFA European Under-21 Championship qualification match against Cyprus, in which he was named in the starting lineup to make his debut. He was also called up to the squad for a friendly against Sweden on 12 October 2007.

== Career statistics ==
As of end of 2017–18 season

Appearances and goals by club, season and competition
Club	Season	League			FA Cup		League Cup		Other		Total	
Club	Season	Division	Apps	Goals	Apps	Goals	Apps	Goals	Apps	Goals	Apps	Goals
Luton Town	2003–04	Second Division	15	1	1	0	0	0	1 (Note: Appearance(s) in Football League Trophy)	0	17	1
Luton Town	2004–05	League One	17	0	1	0	0	0	1	0	19	0
Luton Town	2005–06	Championship	10	1	0	0	2	0	—		12	1
Luton Town	2006–07	Championship	19	1	1	0	3	0	—		23	1
Luton Town	2007–08	League One	28	1	3	0	2	0	1	0	34	1
Luton Town	2008–09	League Two	40	0	2	0	2	0	5	0	49	0
Luton Town	2009–10	Conference Premier	33	2	3	0	—		3 (Note: One appearance in FA Trophy, two in Conference Premier play-offs)	0	39	2
Luton Town	2010–11	Conference Premier	39	0	5	0	—		6 (Note: Three appearances in FA Trophy, three in Conference Premier play-offs)	0	50	0
Luton Town	2011–12	Conference Premier	33	1	2	0	—		7 (Note: Four appearances and one goal in FA Trophy, three appearances in Conference Premier play-offs)	1	42	2
Luton Town	Total		234	7	18	0	9	0	24	1	285	8
Preston North End	2012–13	League One	26	1	1	0	2	0	2	0	31	1
Preston North End	2013–14	League One	38	1	5	0	2	0	1 (Note: Appearance in League One play-offs)	0	46	1
Preston North End	2014–15	League One	0	0	0	0	0	0	0	0	0	0
Preston North End	Total		64	2	6	0	4	0	3	0	77	2
Crawley Town (loan)	2014–15	League One	12	0	1	0	—		2	0	15	0
Stevenage (loan)	2014–15	League Two	7	0	—		—		—		7	0
Cambridge United	2015–16	League Two	4	0	0	0	1	0	0	0	5	0
Cambridge United	2016–17	League Two	1	0	—		0	0	0	0	1	0
Cambridge United	Total		5	0	0	0	1	0	0	0	6	0
Stevenage (loan)	2015–16	League Two	6	1	—		—		—		6	1
Rochdale	2016–17	League One	29	0	3	0	—		0	0	32	0
Rochdale	2017–18	League One	3	0	1	0	1	0	0	0	5	0
Rochdale	Total		32	0	4	0	1	0	0	0	37	0
Career total			360	10	29	0	15	0	29	1	433	11

== Honours ==
Luton Town

- Football League One: 2004–05
- Football League Trophy: 2008–09

Individual

- Luton Town Young Player of the Season: 2005–06
- Luton Town Player of the Season: 2007–08, 2008–09
