= Enoch Showunmi =

Nigerian footballer (born 1982)

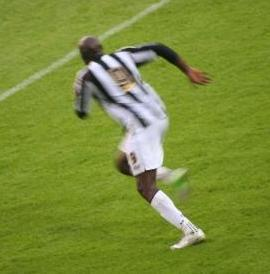

Personal information
- Full name: Enoch Olusesan Showunmi
- Date of birth: 21 April 1982 (age 44)
- Place of birth: Kilburn, London, England
- Height: 6 ft 5 in (1.96 m)
- Position: Forward

Senior career*
Years	Team	Apps	(Gls)
2003–2006	Luton Town	102	(14)
2006–2008	Bristol City	50	(13)
2008	→ Sheffield Wednesday (loan)	10	(0)
2008–2010	Leeds United	15	(2)
2010	Falkirk	21	(1)
2010–2012	Tranmere Rovers	70	(14)
2012–2014	Notts County	36	(4)
2014	→ Torquay United (loan)	7	(0)
2014	→ Plymouth Argyle (loan)	7	(0)
2014–2015	Wealdstone	1	(0)
2014–2015	→ Canvey Island (loan)	23	(5)
2015	Chalfont St Peter	2	(0)
Total		344	(53)

International career
2004	Nigeria	2	(0)
- * Club domestic league appearances and goals

Enoch Olusesan Showunmi (born 21 April 1982) is a former professional footballer who played as a forward. Born in England, he played for Nigeria at international level and won two caps for the team.

== Club career ==
=== Luton Town ===
Showunmi joined Luton Town in early September 2003 following a successful trial spell with the club that saw him feature regularly during the 2003–04 pre-season against such teams as AFC Wimbledon. At the time of his signature Luton had a small squad due to the administrative receivership that they were under, which prevented them signing new players. Regular midfielder and captain Kevin Nicholls received an injury that was to prevent him playing for three months, and Luton were able to use this injury to seek dispensation from the Football League to sign Showunmi.

Showunmi's debut came against Plymouth Argyle in September 2003, and his first goal arrived in a Football League Trophy win against Rushden & Diamonds in November. Late in the season he scored a hat-trick in a home match against Brentford. In total he scored seven goals in 28 appearances during the 2003–04 season, which culminated with his international debut for the Nigeria national team as a 71st-minute substitute in a 3–0 victory against the Republic of Ireland at The Valley on 30 May 2004. He was also a substitute in Nigeria's following 2–0 victory against Jamaica.

Luton's promotion season in 2004–05 saw Showunmi regularly used as a "super-sub" to score six goals in 38 matches, only seven of which he started, including a late winner against AFC Bournemouth after Luton had played most of the game with only 10 men.

In 2005–06 Showunmi often played in midfield, with moderate success, due to injuries to many midfield players at the club.

=== Bristol City ===
Before the 2006–07 season, Showunmi moved to Bristol City on a Bosman transfer. He had a good start to the season, scoring in three consecutive games. However, he featured sporadically for the rest of the season due to injuries and good form from other City strikers. Despite not being a first team regular he finished the season as Bristol City's second top scorer, behind Phil Jevons, with 13 goals in all competitions.

Showunmi faced strong competition for his first team place at the start of the 2007–08 season, especially after fellow strikers Lee Trundle and Darren Byfield signed for the club, and Steve Brooker also being in contention after returning to fitness. On 23 January 2008, he started discussing personal terms with League One team Leeds United, after Leeds and Bristol City agreed terms for a permanent deal to take Showunmi to Elland Road. However, Showunmi snubbed a move to the Yorkshire club and stayed at Ashton Gate to fight for his place in the team.

However, on 31 January, he completed a move to Championship side Sheffield Wednesday on an emergency loan until 1 March. This was later extended for another month, but at the start of April Showunmi decided to return to Ashton Gate in order to aid with the club's promotion push.

On 8 April the FA announced that it had charged Showunmi with "engaging the services of an individual, who was not a licensed agent or entitled to act in such a capacity, to represent him in contract negotiations with Luton Town in or around February 2004 and between November 2005 and January 2006", an allegation which involved both Bristol City and Charles Collymore. The FA subsequently fined Showunmi £2,000 and Bristol City £15,000, whilst the allegations against Collymore were found not to have been proved.

He was released by City at the end of the 2007–08 season along with fellow striker Darren Byfield, midfielder Alex Russell and defenders Martin Slocombe and Tamás Vaskó.

=== Leeds United ===
Showunmi then signed for Leeds United. He scored on his debut for the club in a league match against Scunthorpe United. After this successful start to his Leeds career most of his goals for the season came in cup games, scoring twice in the League Cup against Crystal Palace and Hartlepool and once in the Football League Trophy against Rotherham United. His second and final league goal for the club came in a 2–1 defeat at Tranmere Rovers on 6 December 2008. Showunmi's last appearance of the season came after featuring as a substitute in a 3–1 defeat to MK Dons the day before manager Gary McAllister's departure. Showunmi did not feature in any more games that season after suffering a serious blood clot in his lung. Leeds managed to reach the playoff semi-finals in Showunmi's absence.

After recovering from injury, the following season Showunmi fell out of favour under new manager Simon Grayson. It wasn't until the start of the 2009–10 season that Showunmi played for Leeds again. Despite being used sparingly he managed to score his sixth and final goal for the club in a League Cup tie with Darlington. He was later released, having scored five goals in seven starts for the Yorkshire side.

=== Falkirk ===
On 14 January 2010, Scottish Premier League team Falkirk signed Showunmi. He made his debut against Celtic. He scored his first goal in 18 matches with an acrobatic volley against Aberdeen on 20 February 2010. It helped Falkirk win the match 3–1. He was released at the end of the season after Falkirk's relegation.

=== Tranmere Rovers ===
On 27 July 2010, Showunmi signed for Tranmere Rovers. He scored his first goal for Tranmere on 24 August 2010 against Swansea City in the League Cup with a neat finish from a tight angle. He then scored his second goal for the club, his first for them in the Football League, four days later in 2–2 draw against Dagenham & Redbridge. At the end of his first season, Enoch received the Player of The Season Award, after finishing as the club's top scorer with 13 goals. In the summer of 2011, Showunmi was subject to three bids made by Notts County – £75,000, £100,000 and £125,000, all of which were rejected.

He was released at the end of the 2011–12 season.

=== Notts County ===
Showunmi signed with Notts County on 12 June 2012 on a free transfer, scoring his first goal in a 2–1 away victory over Scunthorpe United on 4 September 2012 in the first round of the Football League Trophy. He scored his first league goal for the club on 22 January 2013. Showunmi left the club at the end of the 2013–14 season when his contract expired.

==== Torquay United (loan) ====
On 28 February 2014, Showunmi joined League Two side Torquay United on a one-month loan.

==== Plymouth Argyle (loan) ====
On 27 March 2014, Showunmi joined League Two side Plymouth Argyle on loan for the remainder of the 2013–14 season.

=== Wealdstone ===
On 26 September 2014, Showunmi signed for Conference South side Wealdstone. Showunmni then joined Canvey Island on loan on 1 December 2014 in order to get more game time.

In late 2016, Showunmi announced his retirement from football on his official Facebook profile.

== International career ==
Showunmi has played twice for Nigeria, with both appearances coming in 2004.

== Honours ==
Luton Town

- Football League One: 2004–05

Bristol City

- Football League One runner-up: 2006–07

Nigeria

- Unity Cup
