= Dino Šeremet =

Slovenian footballer

Personal information
- Date of birth: 16 August 1980 (age 46)
- Place of birth: Ljubljana, SFR Yugoslavia
- Height: 1.95 m (6 ft 5 in)
- Position: Goalkeeper

Team information
- Current team: Rodina Moscow (GK coach)

Senior career*
| Years | Team | Apps | (Gls) |
| 2001–2002 | Aluminij | 26 | (0) |
| 2002–2004 | Maribor | 7 | (0) |
| 2004–2005 | Luton Town | 7 | (0) |
| 2005 | → Doncaster Rovers (loan) | 1 | (0) |
| 2006 | → Tranmere Rovers (loan) | 13 | (0) |
| 2006–2007 | Kerkyra | 2 | (0) |
| 2007–2008 | Kallithea | 24 | (0) |
| 2008–2010 | AEL | 3 | (0) |
| 2010–2012 | Doxa Drama | 31 | (0) |
| 2012–2013 | AEL | 36 | (0) |
| 2013–2014 | Panthrakikos | 19 | (0) |
| Total | | 169 | (0) |

Managerial career
- 2025–: Rodina Moscow (GK coach)
- * Club domestic league appearances and goals

Dino Šeremet (born 16 August 1980) is a Slovenian professional football coach and a former goalkeeper. He is the goalkeeping coach with Russian club Rodina Moscow.

== Career ==
Šeremet spent loan spells at Tranmere Rovers and Doncaster Rovers, while contracted to Luton Town While on loan to Tranmere, Seremet was their first-choice goalkeeper. He became notable when signing for Luton in July 2004, though Seremet failed to break into the first-team at the English side, making six first-team appearances.

Šeremet signed a two-year contract with AEL in July 2008. He managed to play only in 3 matches and in January 2011 he signed with Doxa Drama. Although he had a very successful season with 31 appearances, the team was once more relegated from Super League Greece. In August 2012, he returned to Larissa and signed a one-year contract till the end of the season.
