= Paul Underwood =

English association football player

Personal information
- Date of birth: 16 August 1973 (age 53)
- Place of birth: Wimbledon, London, England
- Height: 5 ft 9 in (1.75 m)
- Positions: Left midfielder; defender

Senior career*
Years	Team	Apps	(Gls)
	Carshalton Athletic	?	(?)
	Sutton United	?	(?)
	Dorking	?	(?)
	Molesey	?	(?)
1996–1997	Enfield	?	(?)
1997–2004	Rushden & Diamonds	182	(16)
2004–2008	Luton Town	67	(5)
- * Club domestic league appearances and goals as of 12:24, 21 August 2008 (UTC)

Paul Underwood (born 16 August 1973) is a former professional footballer. He previously played for Football League Two club Luton Town.

Underwood began his career with Carshalton Athletic, and after spells at Sutton United, Dorking and Molesey, he moved to Enfield. After a year at Enfield he joined Rushden & Diamonds for £50,000 in the summer of 1997. He made over 200 appearances during his time at Nene Park, and during this period he captained the club in the Football Conference and Football League Two title-winning campaigns.

Underwood was signed by Luton Town in March 2004, but was injured just 19 minutes into his debut – two days after joining the club. The injury forced him to miss the remainder of the 2003–04 season.

He had a superb season during the 2004–05 campaign as the Hatters won the Football League One Championship, with Underwood playing mainly on the left-wing. The 2005–06 season saw Underwood used as a utility player, operating at left-back, left midfield, central midfield and central defence as Luton finished a respectable 10th in The Championship.

Underwood suffered massively during the 2006–07 season in The Championship, as a routine knee operation during the pre-season period caused a blood infection, leading to Underwood losing over two stone in weight. The effects forced him to miss the entire season, and he had to watch from the sidelines as Luton were relegated.

Despite not playing a game the previous season, Underwood had shown enough ability during his two years at Kenilworth Road to persuade then Hatters boss Mike Newell to give him a new two-year contract, which he duly signed, keeping him at Luton until the summer of 2009.

Underwood, however, never made a full recovery from his illness, and spent his last two seasons without playing a single game for Luton. On 1 October 2008, Underwood opted to leave Luton Town owing to injury.

== Honours ==
Rushden & Diamonds

- Football League Third Division: 2002–03
- Football Conference: 2000–01

Luton Town

- Football League One: 2004–05

Individual

- PFA Team of the Year: 2002–03 Third Division
