= Kevin Nicholls =

English footballer (born 1979)

Personal information
- Full name: Kevin John Richard Nicholls
- Date of birth: 2 January 1979 (age 47)
- Place of birth: Upton Park, England
- Height: 6 ft 0 in (1.83 m)
- Position: Midfielder

Youth career
- ?–1996: Charlton Athletic

Senior career*
Years	Team	Apps	(Gls)
1996–1999	Charlton Athletic	12	(1)
1999	→ Brighton & Hove Albion (loan)	4	(1)
1999–2001	Wigan Athletic	28	(0)
2001–2006	Luton Town	175	(30)
2006–2007	Leeds United	13	(0)
2007–2008	Preston North End	18	(0)
2008–2010	Luton Town	42	(0)
Total		292	(32)

International career
1997	England U18	7	(0)
1999	England U20	3	(0)
- * Club domestic league appearances and goals

Kevin John Richard Nicholls (born 2 January 1979) is an English former footballer who played in midfield.

He most recently played for Luton Town, a club where he spent eight years at in two separate spells. At the beginning of his second stint at Luton in 2008, in which he dropped two divisions to play, Nicholls stated that his main motivation for returning was his love for the club. A long-term knee injury sustained in 2009 led to him volunteering to be released from his contract on 27 August 2010 and he subsequently retired from professional football.

Nicholls is one of Luton's most successful captains, having won two promotions and the Football League Trophy during his tenure.

== Club career ==
=== Charlton Athletic ===
Born in Upton Park, London, Nicholls began his playing career at Charlton Athletic, making his debut in the 1996–97 season as a substitute in a 2–1 loss to Ipswich Town. He scored his first and what turned out to be only goal for the club in a 2–2 draw at home to Barnsley on 15 February 1997. After a serious knee injury ruled him out of most of the 1997–98 season, he failed to break into the team in 1998–99 season and was loaned to Brighton & Hove Albion, who promptly sent him back after four games despite scoring on his debut against Leyton Orient.

=== Wigan Athletic ===
After a short period back at Charlton, Nicholls was transferred to Wigan Athletic, then in the Second Division, in the summer of 1999 for £250,000, rising to £650,000 based on appearances. In the 1999–2000 season he was injured on his Wigan debut in October and would not play again for another six months, making a total of just 8 appearances over the course of the campaign. Nicholls played in 26 games in the 2000–01 season, scoring his only goal for Wigan in the 2–1 defeat to Reading in the play-off semi-final.

=== Luton Town ===
In the summer of 2001, Joe Kinnear signed Nicholls for Luton Town for an initial fee of £25,000, rising to £150,000 depending on appearances. He was a pivotal player in Luton's promotion season of 2001–02, becoming the club captain and playing in 42 games. At Luton, Nicholls managed for several seasons to avoid the injuries that dogged him at previous clubs and became the "heart and soul of the team" according to Kinnear. In the 2003–04 season he became injured and missed 5 months of the campaign. After the injury he returned to his preferred central midfield position and contributed to Luton's 10th-place finish.

In the 2004–05 season Nicholls was voted Player of the Year by Luton supporters as the club won the League One championship. It was Nicholls who lifted the championship trophy following a 4–2 victory against Brentford in April. He scored 14 goals, most of which came, crucially at times, from the penalty spot.

Nicholls was a vital part of the Luton side that not only finished 10th in the Championship in their first season, but in the match against Liverpool in the FA Cup; a game in which the Hatters went into a 3–1 lead courtesy of Nicholls, once again, with a penalty. The Hatters eventually fell short of the quality to see out the game, losing 5–3, but many of the players, such as Nicholls, who had spent the majority of their careers in the lower leagues, were now in the public eye.

=== Leeds United ===
On 26 July 2006, Nicholls signed for Leeds United for a fee of £700,000. In his first training session with Leeds, he damaged his knee ligaments but hoped to be fit within three months. Nicholls' quick rehabilitation allowed him to make his debut for the club as a substitute in Leeds' match against Sunderland on 13 September 2006, over a month before he was due back.

Nicholls picked up another injury on 30 September 2006 against West Bromwich Albion, which kept him out until December. On 26 October 2006, he was made the new captain of Leeds United by new manager Dennis Wise, with Shaun Derry being appointed his deputy.

Nicholls returned from injury on 16 December 2006, starting in the 1–0 loss against Ipswich Town. This was his first game as captain of Leeds and it ended with a red card in the dying minutes. Leeds manager Dennis Wise decided not to appeal against the decision, so Nicholls missed Leeds' following three matches over the Christmas period. Nicholls returned to the side once his suspension had been served in a 2–1 victory over Coventry City.

On 3 March 2007, Nicholls was dropped for Leeds' home match against Sheffield Wednesday. In his post-match interview, Wise stated that Nicholls had asked to leave the club and return to his former club Luton Town. However, Wise demanded that he would not allow Nicholls to return to Luton unless the original fee of £700,000 was to be paid back to Leeds. It was also stated that Nicholls had been stripped of the captaincy. He has since become somewhat of a hate figure amongst Leeds fans. He ended the season having made just 15 appearances in all competitions, with his last game for the club coming in late February.

=== Preston North End ===
On 29 June 2007, Nicholls left Leeds and agreed to sign a contract to move to Preston North End for a fee of £750,000. He officially moved to Preston on 5 July 2007, due to Leeds' administration status forcing them to delay all trading until that date.

Nicholls' spell at Preston was initially successful. He was a regular fixture in the starting line-up under manager Paul Simpson in the first few months of the season, but featured little following the arrival of new manager Alan Irvine, falling behind Paul McKenna, Darren Carter and new signing Richard Chaplow. On 2 August 2008, it was announced that Preston North End and Nicholls had come to an agreement to release him from his contract.

=== Luton Town return ===
On 2 August 2008, Nicholls signed a three-year contract with former club Luton Town, stating that he will always support Luton and loves the club. He returned as club captain, taking over from Keith Keane. Nicholls missed much of the 2008–09 season as a result of recurring injury problems, but returned fully fit in the final run-in of games. On 24 March 2009, he was given a five-game ban and £1,000 fine for supposedly applauding Luton fans for throwing missiles at the referee after a controversial 3–3 draw with Bradford City.

On 5 April 2009, Nicholls captained Luton to a 3–2 victory over Scunthorpe United at Wembley Stadium in the Football League Trophy final, picking up the man-of-the-match award for his performance in the heart of midfield. He played for Luton in their 0–0 draw with Chesterfield on 13 April, which saw them lose their Football League status and suffer relegation to the Conference Premier.

Despite a recurrence of his knee problem, Nicholls played in 23 league games during the 2009–10 season. It was later revealed by Luton director Gary Sweet that Nicholls had deliberately downplayed the seriousness of this injury to lead the team, "playing through excruciating pain and ultimately risking his long term health". Surgery on this knee in early March 2010 ruled Nicholls out for up to eight months. Ultimately, this injury proved to be the end of his playing career. On 27 August 2010, he left the club by "respectful, mutual consent" after volunteering to be released from his contract, citing that he did not want to take money out of the club while not contributing on the pitch owing to his injury. In a club statement, managing director Gary Sweet branded Nicholls a Luton Town "legend" and "arguably the club's most successful captain".

== Post-playing career ==
On 6 November 2010, it was confirmed by Rushden & Diamonds that Nicholls had joined the club's coaching staff. Rushden manager Justin Edinburgh said of him: "He didn't feel his body could train and play anymore... I think he's got good knowledge and will probably give us a different perspective... the players will learn from him and I feel if I can give someone the opportunity it's the right thing to do." Rushden & Diamonds were liquidated in June 2011 after entering financial difficulty and Nicholls left the club.

He is works in player recruitment for a footballing agency, alongside former Luton defender Marvin Johnson.

== International career ==
He was capped once and then sent off for the England under-20 team.

== Honours ==
Luton Town

- Football League One: 2004–05
- Football League Third Division second-place promotion: 2001–02
- Football League Trophy: 2008–09

Individual

- PFA Team of the Year: 2004–05 Football League One
