= Stephen O'Leary =

English footballer

Personal information
- Full name: Stephen Michael O'Leary
- Date of birth: 2 February 1985 (age 41)
- Place of birth: Barnet, England
- Position: Midfielder

Team information
- Current team: Hemel Hempstead Town

Senior career*
Years	Team	Apps	(Gls)
2001–2008	Luton Town	83	(3)
2005–2006	→ Tranmere Rovers (loan)	21	(3)
2008–2009	Hereford United	15	(1)
2009–2010	Bradford City^{[A]}	7	(0)
2010	Kettering Town	1	(0)
2011	Boreham Wood	2	(0)
2011	Kettering Town	1	(0)
2011	Dunstable Town	2	(3)
2011–2012	Kettering Town	?	(?)
2012–	Hemel Hempstead Town	0	(0)
- * Club domestic league appearances and goals

Stephen Michael O'Leary (born 2 February 1985 in London) is an English footballer who is contracted to Hemel Hempstead Town. He previously played in the Football League for Luton Town, Tranmere Rovers, Hereford United and Bradford City.

== Career ==
O'Leary is a midfield player, who played across the midfield for Luton, but is said to prefer a central role. He has played for the Republic of Ireland at U16, U17, and 18 levels. He was involved in a Luton youth who produced a number of good players. He made his debut for Luton in November 2003, away at Rushden & Diamonds. In this season Luton went on to be crowned league 1 champions. During the 2005–06 season, he joined Tranmere Rovers on loan. He gave a great account of himself, and won the praises of supporters and then manager Brian Little. The Tranmere supporters called for him to be signed on a long-term contract, however after numerous offers from other clubs he choose to sign a new one-year contract at Luton in May 2007. He left Luton in 2008 after turning down a new contract offer as he wanted to play at a higher level.

On 27 August 2008 he signed for Hereford United on a one-year deal. He made his mark on his debut in the 2–0 home win over Crewe Alexandra by opening the scoring with a shot from 25 yards and setting up Bradley Hudson-Odoi for the second, collecting the man of the match award. His period at Hereford was largely interrupted by injury. He left at the end of the season to join bradford city.

On 6 August 2009 O'Leary signed for Bradford City. Again his season was disturbed due to a lengthy toe injury. He left Bradford City at the end of the 2009–10 season with regret as he felt he never showed bradford fans his ability due to his injury.

Just before the start of the 2010–11 season, O'Leary joined Conference National side Kettering Town on non-contract terms.

O'Leary joined Dunstable Town early in 2011–12, scoring a hat-trick in his second and final appearance before returning to Kettering Town. He then joined Hemel Hempstead Town in June 2012.

== Personal life ==
O'Leary's cousin is Noel O'Leary.

== Honours ==
Luton Town

- Football League One: 2004–05

== Notes ==
A. ^{a} ^{b} : Soccerbase has divided O'Leary's Bradford appearances between his own page and a page for a non-existent "Steve O'Neill". O'Leary's profile at Bradford City's website confirms his debut in a match against Port Vale which Soccerbase attributes to "O'Neill", and Bradford City's statistics page confirms his total of seven appearances.
