= Rob Beckwith =

English footballer

Personal information
- Full name: Robert Beckwith
- Date of birth: 12 September 1984 (age 42)
- Place of birth: Hackney, England
- Height: 6 ft 2 in (1.88 m)
- Position: Goalkeeper

Senior career*
Years	Team	Apps	(Gls)
2002–2006	Luton Town	17	(0)
2005	→ Rugby United (loan)	8	(0)
2006	→ Chesterfield (loan)	2	(0)
2006–2007	Hitchin Town	29	(0)
2007–2009	Barnet	14	(0)
2009	Grays Athletic	8	(0)
2010	Hemel Hempstead Town		
- * Club domestic league appearances and goals

Robert Beckwith (born 12 September 1984) is an English former professional footballer, who plays as a goalkeeper.

Beckwith now works as a maths teacher at the Blue School Wells. He joined this school in September 2025.

== Career ==
Beckwith made his debut for Luton Town, and produced a man of the match display in a 2–2 draw with Bristol City. During his time at Kenilworth Road he was plagued with injuries which ultimately stopped his career progressing with Arsenal being one club that was tracking the highly rated young stopper. In his last season at Luton, he joined Chesterfield on loan before being released. He tried his luck overseas before returning for a spell at Hitchin Town and then Barnet.

He was signed by Barnet ostensibly to provide cover for Lee Harrison, but broke into the first team in January 2008. He starred as the Bees beat Swindon Town on penalties in an FA Cup third round replay, saving the penalty that won the shootout for Barnet. In the next season he was given the number 1 shirt, but lost his place to Harrison and later Ran Kadoch. After being made available for loan in January 2009, Beckwith handed in his resignation at Barnet, saying he had lost his love for the game, however just a couple of weeks later he was snapped up by Grays Athletic. He made his debut in the 2–1 home victory over Altrincham on 7 March 2009.
