= Marlon Beresford =

English footballer

Personal information
- Full name: Marlon Beresford
- Date of birth: 2 September 1969 (age 57)
- Place of birth: Lincoln, England
- Height: 6 ft 1 in (1.85 m)
- Position: Goalkeeper

Team information
- Current team: Stevenage (goalkeeping coach)

Youth career
- –1987: Sheffield Wednesday

Senior career*
Years	Team	Apps	(Gls)
1987–1992	Sheffield Wednesday	0	(0)
1989	→ Bury (loan)	1	(0)
1990	→ Northampton Town (loan)	13	(0)
1991	→ Crewe Alexandra (loan)	3	(0)
1991	→ Northampton Town (loan)	15	(0)
1992–1998	Burnley	240	(0)
1998–2002	Middlesbrough	10	(0)
2001	→ Sheffield Wednesday (loan)	4	(0)
2001	→ Wolverhampton Wanderers (loan)	0	(0)
2002	→ Burnley (loan)	13	(0)
2002	York City	6	(0)
2002–2003	Burnley	34	(0)
2003	Bradford City	5	(0)
2003–2004	Luton Town	11	(0)
2004	Barnsley	14	(0)
2004–2008	Luton Town	105	(0)
2007	→ Oldham Athletic (loan)	5	(0)
2010	Middlesbrough Supporters South	2	(0)
Total		471	(0)
- * Club domestic league appearances and goals

Marlon Beresford (born 2 September 1969) is an English former professional footballer and current goalkeeping coach at Stevenage. He formerly also worked as an accountancy tutor and sports commentator after retiring from football.

== Career ==
=== Sheffield Wednesday and early loans ===
Born in Lincoln, Lincolnshire, Beresford started his career in the Sheffield Wednesday youth system. He signed a professional contract in September 1987. While at the Yorkshire club, he was sent out on loan to Bury, Northampton Town twice and Crewe Alexandra.

=== Burnley ===
After failing to break into the Sheffield Wednesday first team, Beresford was sold for a fee of £95,000 to Burnley, and made almost 250 appearances over a six-year period.

=== Middlesbrough and further loans ===
Beresford was signed to provide goalkeeping backup to Mark Schwarzer and kept three clean sheets in his first three games, helping the club to promotion to the Premier League. During the 2001–02 season he was then loaned to Sheffield Wednesday, Wolverhampton Wanderers and Burnley for a second spell.

=== Later career ===
When his contract with Middlesbrough ended, Beresford joined York City on a short-term contract in August 2002, before joining Burnley for the third time, on an initial one month contract in September. Despite doubts over his proficiency, he played a whole season at Burnley. A return to York for the following season fell through due to insurance problems regarding an old back injury. He then signed for Bradford City on a free transfer in September 2003, after which he moved to Luton Town.

=== Luton Town, Barnsley and Oldham Athletic ===
Beresford impressed for Luton, becoming a fans favourite, but an FA-imposed transfer embargo which prevented the Hatters from signing him permanently. When his loan ended he moved to Barnsley but, after Luton came out of administration and had the embargo lifted, he was re-signed for Luton by Mike Newell in 2004.

Beresford played a key role in Luton's League One winning side in 2004–05 – the first time in his career he had picked up a championship winners medal. Due to his experience, he continued making appearances throughout the 2005–06 season and contributed significantly to Luton's respectable finish of 10th place. Beresford also played in the 2006–07 season which saw Luton relegated from the Championship.

Beresford spent a month on loan at Oldham Athletic between 18 October and 18 November 2007. A compromise was then reached with Luton with regard to his contract in 2008 .

== Post-playing career ==
Marlon has served as a goalkeeping coach with the Irish Football Association, working with the Northern Ireland under-21, under-19, and under-17 squads, as well as holding a coaching role at Barnet FC. He has also established an accountancy training company with offices in Belfast and Edinburgh, and has worked as a radio summariser for BBC Three Counties Radio covering Luton Town and BBC Radio Lancashire covering Burnley FC in the Premier League.

In 2017 Beresford re-joined Barnet FC as Goalkeeping coach but after only 2 months he teamed up with former teammate Stephen Robinson who was appointed manager and joined Motherwell FC as their full-time Goalkeeping coach.

In the summer of 2022, Beresford joined Woking, before joining Stevenage two years later.

== Honours ==
Burnley

- Football League Second Division play-offs: 1994

Luton Town

- Football League One: 2004–05

Individual

- PFA Team of the Year: 1992–93 Second Division, 1993–94 Second Division, 2004–05 League One
