= Ian Hillier =

Welsh footballer

Personal information
- Date of birth: 26 December 1979 (age 46)
- Place of birth: Neath, Wales
- Position: Defender

Senior career*
| Years | Team | Apps | (Gls) |
| 2000–2001 | Tottenham Hotspur | 0 | (0) |
| 2001 | → Luton Town (loan) | 13 | (1) |
| 2001–2005 | Luton Town | 42 | (0) |
| 2004–2005 | → Chester City (loan) | 8 | (0) |
| 2005–2008 | Newport County | 110 | (6) |
| 2009 | Newport County | 0 | (0) |
| 2009–2012 | Neath | 38 | (1) |
| 2012–2013 | Carmarthen Town | 27 | (0) |
| 2013–2014 | Afan Lido | 19 | (1) |
| 2014–2015 | Goytre United | | |
| 2015–???? | Briton Ferry Llansawel | | |

International career
| 2001 | Wales U21 | 5 | (0) |
| 2007 | Wales Semi-Pro | 1 | (0) |
- * Club domestic league appearances and goals

Ian Hillier (born 26 December 1979) is a Welsh former footballer.

== Career ==
A Welsh under-21 international, Hillier began his professional career at Tottenham Hotspur before joining Luton Town on loan in August 2001. He made his professional debut in a 2–1 win over Cheltenham Town on 18 August and went on to make a total of 13 appearances in all competitions, scoring one goal in a 2–1 win over York City. Towards the end of 2001, he made his move to Luton permanent with a two-year deal for a fee of £30,000. A regular in his first two seasons, Hillier gradually fell out of favour with new manager Mike Newell and, after making 42 league appearances and having a spell on loan at Chester City, left to join Newport County in the summer of 2005 following trial spells at Oxford United, Bristol Rovers and Grimsby Town. Hillier made his debut for the Wales semi-professional international team in May 2007.

At the end of his first season at Newport, Hillier was voted both players and supporters player of the year and was later awarded the captaincy at the start of the 2008–09 season. In September 2008 Hillier broke his leg in three places in an accident while working in his day job as a tree surgeon when a falling branch struck his leg, breaking his tibia, fibula and ankle. He was subsequently sacked by Newport County as he was unable to fulfil his contract and would be out of the game for a large part of the 2008–09 season. Hillier appealed against the cancellation of his contract and won an initial case against the club. Newport themselves decided to appeal against the case but prior to the hearing a surprising turnaround saw the club offer Hillier a new contract, which he accepted. However, he never played for Newport again and signed for Neath in April 2009.

He joined Carmarthen Town in June 2012 after the liquidation of Neath.
