= 2006–07 Luton Town F.C. season =

English football club season

Luton Town
2006–07 season
- Chairman: Bill Tomlins (until 11 April); David Pinkney (from 13 April)
- Manager: Mike Newell (until 15 March); Brian Stein (caretaker); Kevin Blackwell (from 2 April)
- Stadium: Kenilworth Road
- Championship: 23rd (relegated)
- FA Cup: Fourth round
- League Cup: Third round
- Top goalscorer: League: Vine (12); All: Vine (14)
- Average home league attendance: 8,580
Home colours	Away colours

During the 2006–07 English football season, Luton Town competed in the Championship.

== Season summary ==
A successful start to the season saw Luton fifth after thirteen games, sparking hopes that Luton could challenge for a return to the top flight. However, defender Sol Davis suffered a stroke on the team bus on the way to play Ipswich Town. The event clearly shook the Luton side, who lost 5–0 at Portman Road. Six straight losses after the match at Ipswich dragged Luton down to 20th, and by the end of February, Luton, by now a shadow of the side that had won promotion to the Championship only two years before, were hovering perilously close to the relegation zone.

Newell was sacked on 15 March 2007, and two directors, Martin King and Liam Day, resigned from the board as a result. Brian Stein lasted just one game as caretaker boss before Kevin Blackwell was announced as Luton's new manager. 11 April saw chairman Bill Tomlins resign his position following an investigation by the Football Association into irregular payments made by the Football Club's parent company, and confirm that illegal payments had been made to incoming players' agents. David Pinkney was confirmed as new chairman two days later, also acquiring a controlling interest in the club's holding company. Luton's relegation was confirmed a week later in a 1–0 defeat away to Derby County.

== Kit ==
Diadora became Luton's new kit manufacturers after the club chose not to extend the previous deal with Xara. Electrolux became the new kit sponsors.

== Final league table ==
Pos	Team	Pld	W	D	L	GF	GA	GD	Pts	Promotion, qualification or relegation
20	Barnsley	46	15	5	26	53	85	−32	50	
21	Hull City	46	13	10	23	51	67	−16	49	
22	Southend United (R)	46	10	12	24	47	80	−33	42	Relegation to Football League One
23	Luton Town (R)	46	10	10	26	53	81	−28	40	Relegation to Football League One
24	Leeds United (R)	46	13	7	26	46	72	−26	36 (Note: Leeds United had 10 points deducted for entering financial administration.)	Relegation to Football League One

Source: RSSSF
Rules for classification: In the Football League goals scored (F) takes precedence over goal difference (GD).
(R) Relegated

== Results ==
Luton Town's score comes first

=== Legend ===
Win	Draw	Loss

=== Football League Championship ===
Date	Opponent	Venue	Result	Attendance	Scorers
5 August 2006	Leicester City	H	2–0	8,131	Barnett, Edwards
8 August 2006	Sheffield Wednesday	A	1–0	22,613	Emanuel
12 August 2006	Norwich City	A	2–3	23,863	Vine, Morgan
19 August 2006	Stoke City	H	2–2	7,727	Barnett, Langley (pen)
26 August 2006	Wolverhampton Wanderers	A	0–1	19,378	
9 September 2006	Crystal Palace	H	2–1	9,187	Edwards, Vine
12 September 2006	Colchester United	H	1–1	7,609	Parkin
16 September 2006	Cardiff City	A	1–4	14,108	Vine
23 September 2006	West Bromwich Albion	H	2–2	9,332	Vine (2)
30 September 2006	Barnsley	A	2–1	10,175	Edwards, Brković
14 October 2006	Birmingham City	H	3–2	9,275	Vine (2, 1 pen), Bell
17 October 2006	Hull City	A	0–0	14,895	
21 October 2006	Leeds United	H	5–1	10,260	Edwards (2), Vine, Bell, Heikkinen
29 October 2006	Ipswich Town	A	0–5	20,975	
31 October 2006	Burnley	H	0–2	7,664	
4 November 2006	Preston North End	A	0–3	13,094	
11 November 2006	Queens Park Rangers	H	2–3	9,007	Brković, Boyd
18 November 2006	Derby County	H	0–2	9,708	
25 November 2006	Southampton	A	1–2	20,482	Perrett
28 November 2006	Plymouth Argyle	A	0–1	9,965	
2 December 2006	Preston North End	H	2–0	7,665	Vine, Edwards
9 December 2006	Sunderland	A	1–2	30,445	Morgan
15 December 2006	Southend United	H	0–0	7,468	
23 December 2006	Coventry City	H	3–1	8,299	Brković, Vine, Morgan
26 December 2006	Colchester United	A	1–4	5,427	Vine (pen)
29 December 2006	Birmingham City	A	2–2	24,642	Vine, Feeney
1 January 2007	Cardiff City	H	0–0	8,004	
12 January 2007	West Bromwich Albion	A	2–3	19,927	Keane, Feeney
20 January 2007	Barnsley	H	0–2	7,441	
30 January 2007	Coventry City	A	0–1	18,781	
3 February 2007	Leicester City	A	1–1	20,410	Morgan
17 February 2007	Stoke City	A	0–0	12,375	
20 February 2007	Sheffield Wednesday	H	3–2	8,011	Runström, Spurr (own goal), Talbot
24 February 2007	Crystal Palace	A	1–2	16,177	Hudson (own goal)
27 February 2007	Norwich City	H	2–3	8,868	Runström, Talbot
3 March 2007	Wolverhampton Wanderers	H	2–3	10,002	Emanuel, Barnett
10 March 2007	Leeds United	A	0–1	27,138	
13 March 2007	Hull City	H	1–2	7,777	Talbot
17 March 2007	Ipswich Town	H	0–2	8,880	
31 March 2007	Burnley	A	0–0	11,088	
7 April 2007	Southampton	H	0–2	9,171	
9 April 2007	Queens Park Rangers	A	2–3	14,360	Coyne, Bell (pen)
14 April 2007	Plymouth Argyle	H	1–2	7,601	O'Leary
20 April 2007	Derby County	A	0–1	28,499	
28 April 2007	Southend United	A	3–1	10,276	Andrew, Spring, Idrizaj
6 May 2007	Sunderland	H	0–5	10,260	

=== FA Cup ===
Round	Date	Opponent	Venue	Result	Attendance	Goalscorers
R3	6 January 2007	Queens Park Rangers	A	2–2	10,064	Vine, Feeney
R3R	23 January 2007	Queens Park Rangers	H	1–0	7,494	Rehman (own goal)
R4	27 January 2007	Blackburn Rovers	H	0–4	5,887	

=== League Cup ===
Round	Date	Opponent	Venue	Result	Attendance	Goalscorers
R1	22 August 2006	Bristol Rovers	A	1–1 (won 5–3 on pens)	2,882	Boyd
R2	19 September 2006	Brentford	A	3–0	3,005	Morgan, Feeney, Vine
R3	24 October 2006	Everton	A	0–4	27,149	

== Squad ==
Note: Flags indicate national team as defined under FIFA eligibility rules; some limited exceptions apply. Players may hold more than one non-FIFA nationality.

No.	Pos.	Nation	Player
1	GK	ENG	Marlon Beresford
2	DF	IRL	Kevin Foley
3	DF	ENG	Sol Davis
4	DF	AUS	Chris Coyne
5	DF	ENG	Russell Perrett
6	DF	ENG	Paul Underwood
7	MF	ENG	Matthew Spring
8	MF	NIR	Steve Robinson
9	FW	SWE	Björn Runström (on loan from Fulham)
10	FW	NIR	Warren Feeney
11	FW	ENG	Dean Morgan
14	MF	ENG	Michael Leary
15	MF	ENG	Stephen O'Leary
16	DF	ENG	Lewis Emanuel
17	MF	ENG	Richard Langley
18	MF	CRO	Ahmet Brković

No.	Pos.	Nation	Player
19	FW	ENG	Sam Parkin
20	FW	ENG	Adam Boyd
21	MF	IRL	Keith Keane
22	FW	ENG	Danny Stevens
23	FW	AUT	Besian Idrizaj (on loan from Liverpool)
24	DF	ENG	Shaun Ross
25	DF	ENG	Leon Barnett
26	DF	FIN	Markus Heikkinen
27	MF	ENG	Peter Holmes
28	MF	IRL	David Bell
29	FW	ENG	Calvin Andrew
30	FW	ENG	Drew Talbot
32	DF	ENG	Ed Asafu-Adjaye
33	GK	ENG	Dean Brill
34	GK	ENG	Zac Barrett
35	DF	ENG	Chris Pendleton

=== Left club during season ===
Note: Flags indicate national team as defined under FIFA eligibility rules; some limited exceptions apply. Players may hold more than one non-FIFA nationality.

No.	Pos.	Nation	Player
7	MF	TRI	Carlos Edwards (to Sunderland)
9	FW	ENG	Rowan Vine (to Birmingham City)

No.	Pos.	Nation	Player
23	GK	IRL	Dean Kiely (on loan from Portsmouth)
31	DF	ENG	Clarke Carlisle (on loan from Watford)

== Transfers ==
=== Transfers in ===
Date	Position	Name	Club from	Fee	Source
11 July 2006	MF	Richard Langley	Queens Park Rangers	Free	
21 July 2006	DF	Lewis Emanuel	Bradford City	Free	
28 July 2006	FW	Adam Boyd	Hartlepool United	£500,000	
25 August 2006	FW	Sam Parkin	Ipswich Town	£340,000	
18 January 2007	MF	Matthew Spring	Watford	£200,000	
26 January 2007	FW	Drew Talbot	Sheffield Wednesday	£250,000	

=== Transfers out ===
Date	Position	Name	Club to	Fee	Source
22 July 2006	FW	Steve Howard	Derby County	£1,000,000	
26 July 2006	MF	Kevin Nicholls	Leeds United	£700,000	
2 January 2007	MF	Carlos Edwards	Sunderland	£1,500,000	
11 January 2007	FW	Rowan Vine	Birmingham City	£2,500,000	

=== Loans in ===
Date	Position	Name	Club from	Length	Source
23 November 2006	GK	Dean Kiely	Portsmouth	One month	
30 January 2007	FW	Björn Runström	Fulham	One month	
2 March 2007	DF	Clarke Carlisle	Watford	One month	
16 March 2007	FW	Besian Idrizaj	Liverpool	Until end of season	

=== Loans out ===
Date	Position	Name	Club to	Length	Source
8 December 2006	GK	Dean Brill	Gillingham	Emergency loan (extended 15 December)	
1 January 2007	MF	Michael Leary	Brentford	One month (extended 4 February)	
12 January 2007	MF	Peter Holmes	Chesterfield	One month	
22 March 2007	FW	Warren Feeney	Cardiff City	Until end of season	
22 March 2007	MF	Peter Holmes	Lincoln City	Until end of season	

== Player statistics ==
Players arranged in numerical order by squad number.

No.	Pos.	Name	League		Cup		Total	
No.	Pos.	Name	Apps	Goals	Apps	Goals	Apps	Goals
1	GK	(England) Marlon Beresford	26	0	5	0	31	0
2	DF	(Republic of Ireland) Kevin Foley	38 (1)	0	3 (2)	0	41 (3)	0
3	DF	(England) Sol Davis	20 (4)	0	5	0	25 (4)	0
4	DF	(Australia) Chris Coyne	11 (7)	0	4	0	15 (7)	0
5	DF	(England) Russell Perrett	8 (2)	1	3	0	11 (2)	1
6	DF	(England) Paul Underwood	0	0	0	0	0	0
7	MF	(Trinidad and Tobago) Carlos Edwards	26	6	2 (1)	0	28 (1)	6
7	MF	(England) Matthew Spring	14	1	0	0	14	1
8	MF	(Northern Ireland) Steve Robinson	35 (1)	0	4	0	39 (1)	0
9	FW	(Sweden) Björn Runström	7 (1)	2	0	0	7 (1)	0
9	FW	(England) Rowan Vine	26	12	2 (2)	2	28 (2)	14
10	FW	(Northern Ireland) Warren Feeney	15 (13)	2	3	2	18 (13)	4
11	FW	(England) Dean Morgan	22 (15)	4	4 (2)	1	26 (17)	5
14	MF	(England) Michael Leary	0	0	0	0	0	0
15	MF	(England) Stephen O'Leary	5 (2)	1	3 (1)	0	8 (3)	1
16	DF	(England) Lewis Emanuel	39 (1)	2	2	0	41 (1)	2
17	MF	(England) Richard Langley	18 (11)	1	4	0	22 (11)	1
18	MF	(Croatia) Ahmet Brković	14 (6)	3	4 (1)	0	18 (7)	3
19	FW	(England) Sam Parkin	7 (1)	1	0	0	7 (1)	1
20	FW	(England) Adam Boyd	5 (14)	1	4 (1)	1	9 (15)	2
21	MF	(Republic of Ireland) Keith Keane	17 (2)	1	3 (1)	0	20 (3)	1
22	FW	(England) Danny Stevens	0	0	0	0	0	0
23	GK	(Republic of Ireland) Dean Kiely	11	0	0	0	11	0
23	FW	(Austria) Besian Idrizaj	3 (4)	1	0	0	3 (4)	1
24	DF	(England) Shaun Ross	0	0	0	0	0	0
25	DF	(England) Leon Barnett	39	3	4	0	43	3
26	DF	(Finland) Markus Heikkinen	37	1	0	0	37	1
27	MF	(England) Peter Holmes	3 (2)	0	2	0	5 (2)	0
28	MF	(Republic of Ireland) David Bell	28 (6)	4	5	0	33 (6)	4
29	FW	(England) Calvin Andrew	5 (2)	1	0	0	5 (2)	1
30	FW	(England) Drew Talbot	13 (2)	3	1	0	14 (2)	3
31	DF	(England) Clarke Carlisle	4 (1)	0	0	0	4 (1)	0
33	GK	(England) Dean Brill	9 (2)	0	1	0	10 (2)	0
34	GK	(England) Zac Barrett	0	0	0	0	0	0

== See also ==
- List of Luton Town F.C. seasons
