= Leon Barnett =

British footballer (born 1985)

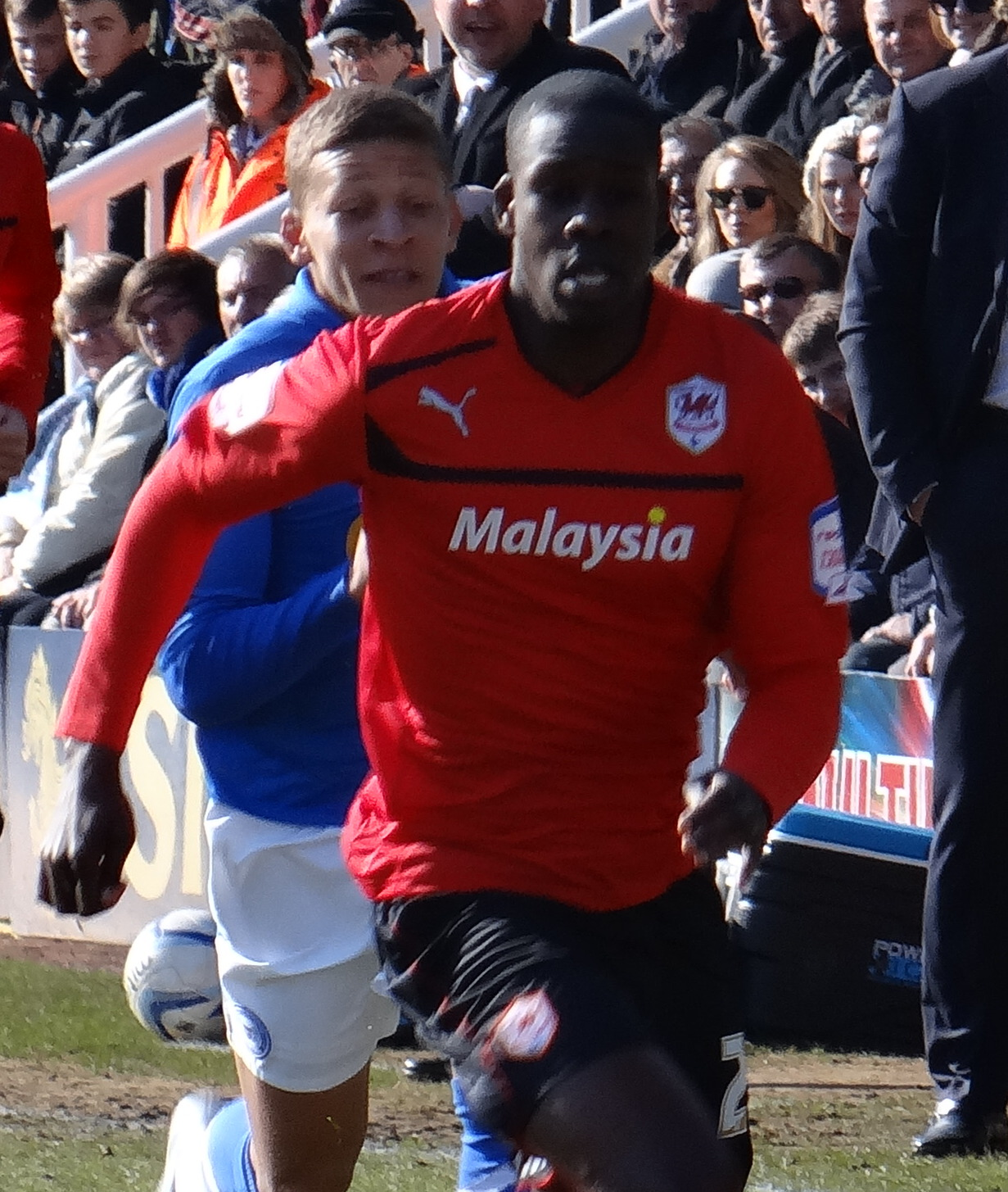
- Leon Barnett playing for Cardiff City in 2013

Personal information
- Full name: Leon Peter Barnett
- Date of birth: 30 November 1985 (age 40)
- Place of birth: Stevenage, England
- Height: 6 ft 1 in (1.85 m)
- Position: Defender

Youth career
- 2002–2005: Luton Town

Senior career*
Years	Team	Apps	(Gls)
2002–2007	Luton Town	59	(3)
2004–2005	→ Aylesbury United (loan)	5	(0)
2007–2011	West Bromwich Albion	45	(3)
2009–2010	→ Coventry City (loan)	20	(0)
2010–2011	→ Norwich City (loan)	20	(1)
2011–2013	Norwich City	30	(1)
2013	→ Cardiff City (loan)	8	(0)
2013–2016	Wigan Athletic	81	(5)
2016–2017	Bury	24	(1)
2017–2018	Northampton Town	19	(1)
Total		311	(15)
- * Club domestic league appearances and goals

Leon Peter Barnett (born 30 November 1985) is an English former professional footballer. A defender, he primarily played as a centre-back, but also played as a full-back, central midfielder and striker.

He began his career with Luton Town where he made his professional debut. After a brief loan spell with non-League side Aylesbury United, he established himself in the first team at Luton and made 70 appearances in all competitions before signing for West Bromwich Albion in 2007 for an initial fee of £2.5 million. In his first season with Albion, he helped the club win promotion to the Premier League by winning the 2007–08 Championship. He later lost his place in the side due to injury and loss of form, spending the majority of the 2009–10 season on loan with Coventry City.

He joined Norwich City on loan in 2010 before completing a permanent transfer in January 2011. His first season with the club led to a second career promotion from the Championship after finishing as runners-up. He appeared sporadically over the following two seasons and was loaned to Cardiff City in the final months of the 2012–13 season before being sold to Wigan Athletic at the end of the campaign. He made nearly 100 appearances for the club, winning League One during the 2015–16 season. He finished his career with spells at Bury and Northampton Town after being forced to retire at the age of 32 due to a heart condition. He subsequently launched his own football academy.

== Career ==
=== Luton Town ===
Barnett began playing at the age of 13 as a right sided midfielder for local team Bushmead Wanderers, competing against boys a year older than himself. He joined Luton Town in 2002 and progressed through their youth system. During the 2002–03 season, he made his first-team debut for the club at the age of 16, coming on as an 86th-minute substitute for Marvin Johnson in a 2–0 away win over Woking in the Football League Trophy on 22 October 2002, but failed to feature again during the season. He featured twice in the Football League Trophy and once in the FA Cup during the 2003–04 season, but was still yet to make a league appearance for the club. He signed a professional contract on 27 September 2004, one day before making a starting appearance in a 2–0 away defeat to Swansea City in the Football League Trophy, during which he was shown a red card after only 12 minutes for a foul on Adrian Forbes.

On 18 November 2004, Barnett joined Southern League Premier Division club Aylesbury United on a one-month loan. He made his debut for the side in a 3–1 home defeat to Histon two days later. His final appearance was in a 2–0 away defeat to Merthyr Tydfil on 18 December 2004. He made a total of six appearances for the club. After the expiration of his loan at Aylesbury, Barnett returned to Luton, but failed to make any further appearances during the season. He was however named in the matchday squad for the 2–1 away win over Wrexham on 23 April 2005, which was enough to guarantee Luton the League One title.

Barnett began the 2005–06 season by making his Football League debut as a 90th-minute substitute for Russell Perrett in a 1–0 away win over Hull City on 17 September 2005. Three days later, he made a starting appearance in a 1–0 away defeat to Reading in the League Cup second round, but was substituted in the 55th minute and replaced by Keith Keane. Barnett was subsequently not included in Luton's matchday squads until 29 October 2005, when he came on as a 62nd-minute substitute for Chris Coyne in a 1–0 away defeat to Coventry City. He featured as a 74th-minute substitute for Markus Heikkinen as Luton were defeated 5–3 at home to Premier League club Liverpool in the FA Cup third round, a match they led 3–1. Barnett continued to feature on the substitute's bench at the start of 2007, until he briefly broke into the first team, making starting appearances in a 3–3 draw with Cardiff City, a 3–2 home win over Championship leaders Reading, their first defeat since the opening day of the season, prior to a 2–1 away defeat to Leeds United. During the month of April, Barnett featured in the final five matches, to finish the season with a total of 22 appearances in all competitions, with Luton finishing in 10th place in the 2005–06 Championship table.

On the opening day of the 2006–07 season, Barnett scored his first professional goal in a 2–0 home win over Leicester City. Two weeks later, he scored a header, his second professional goal in a 2–2 draw with Stoke City on 19 August 2006. Barnett featured in all but seven league matches, making 43 appearances in all competitions and scoring three times, but could not prevent Luton from being relegated to League One after a 1–0 away defeat to Derby County on 20 April 2007. He won the Luton Town Player of the Season award, voted for by the club's supporters.

=== West Bromwich Albion ===
Barnett completed a move to Championship club West Bromwich Albion on 26 July 2007 on a four-year contract for an initial fee of £2.5 million. The fee would rise by a further £250,000 depending on appearances and the club would have to pay Luton a further £250,000 should they gain promotion to the Premier League. Barnett made his debut for the club in a 2–1 away defeat to Burnley on the opening day of the 2007–08 season. He scored his first goal for the club in a 3–2 away win over Scunthorpe United on 22 September 2007. His performance in a 2–1 away win over Leicester City on 8 December 2007 earned him a place in the Championship Team of the Week. He started in a 2–0 away win over Queens Park Rangers on the final day of the season, which was enough to guarantee West Brom the Championship title. As a result, this triggered a promotion clause which was agreed with his former club Luton, thus the latter received an add-on of £250,000 from his transfer. Barnett made 36 appearances during the season, scoring three times.

Following West Brom's promotion, Barnett made his Premier League debut on the opening day of the 2008–09 season in a 1–0 away defeat to Arsenal. Barnett played in the League Cup second round match against Hartlepool United, who produced an upset by defeating West Brom 3–1 after extra time, with Barnett responsible for losing possession in the lead up to their first goal. He played the full 90 minutes in a 0–0 draw with Bolton Wanderers four days later, helping to keep a clean sheet to earn West Brom their first point of the season. Barnett made another starting appearance two weeks later, helping West Brom to win their first match of the season in a 3–2 win over West Ham United by winning a penalty after he was tripped by Robert Green, which was converted by Roman Bednář. However, during West Brom's next match against West Midlands rivals Aston Villa, he was at fault for conceding both goals and lost 2–1 as a result. His poor performance meant he was dropped to the substitutes bench and remained an unused substitute for the subsequent match, a 1–0 away win over Middlesbrough on 27 September 2008, West Brom's first away win of the season. Barnett was as an unused substitute for a further eight matches, during which time he sustained a knee injury, before coming on as a 27th-minute substitute for the injured Abdoulaye Méïté in a 2–0 away defeat to Chelsea on 26 December 2008. Five starting appearances followed, but he sustained an injury and had to be substituted in the 39th minute during the latter match, a 3–0 home win over Middlesbrough on 17 January 2009. Barnett's injury meant he missed a 2–2 draw with Burnley one week later, before returning to the starting lineup for the next match, a 3–2 home defeat to Newcastle United. He made one further starting appearance in a 2–0 away defeat to Fulham two weeks later, before a recurrence of his knee injury ruled him out for the rest of the season.

==== Coventry City (loan) ====
On 4 November 2009, Barnett joined Championship rivals Coventry City on loan until the end of January, having made just two substitute appearances for West Brom in the league during the 2009–10 season. He made his debut for the club in a 2–1 away defeat to Derby County on 6 November 2009. After making 11 appearances for the club during his initial loan spell, Barnett's loan was extended until the end of the season on 2 February 2010. He conceded two penalties in consecutive league appearances, both of which saw him sent off in a 4–1 away defeat to Newcastle United on 17 February 2010, followed by a 2–1 home win over Scunthorpe United 10 days later. Barnett made 20 league appearances for Coventry during his time with the club.

=== Norwich City ===
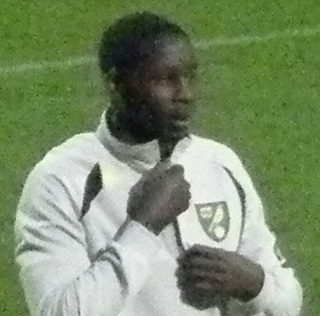
Barnett in 2012 during his time with Norwich City

On 26 August 2010, he joined Norwich City on loan until 4 January 2011, to cover for injuries to Michael Nelson and Zak Whitbread, after having played his first match of the 2010–11 season for West Brom two days previously in a 2–0 away win over Leyton Orient in the League Cup second round. He was handed squad number 20 at Norwich and made his debut two days later in a 1–1 draw with Nottingham Forest at the City Ground, forming a partnership with Elliott Ward. On 20 November 2010, Barnett scored his first goal for the club with a header from a David Fox corner in a 1–1 draw with Leeds United.

It was confirmed on 10 December 2010 that Barnett would join Norwich on a permanent three-and-a-half deal for an undisclosed fee, starting from 1 January 2011. On the following day, he conceded a penalty in a 2–0 home defeat to Portsmouth, for which he received his second yellow card of the match and was subsequently sent off. In protest, he threw the ball at referee Simon Hooper, which earned him an extended two-match ban from The Football Association. Barnett suffered a hamstring injury in a 2–1 home win over Reading on 12 February 2011, which ruled him out for the rest of the season. In his absence, Norwich won promotion to the Premier League as runners-up after a 2–0 away win over Portsmouth on 2 May 2011.

Barnett played in his first Premier League match for Norwich as a 71st-minute substitute for the injured Zak Whitbread in a 1–1 draw with Wigan Athletic on the opening day of the 2011–12 season. He started the next game, a 1–1 draw with Stoke City, but was adjudged by referee Neil Swarbrick to have committed a professional foul on Jonathan Walters in the second half, conceding a penalty and receiving a red card. On 26 September 2011, Barnett scored his first Premier League goal in a 2–1 home win over Sunderland. After featuring in a 2–1 home defeat to Leicester City in the FA Cup fifth round on 18 February 2012, Barnett was only named in the matchday squad on two further occasions, but remained an unused substitute in both matches. He ended the season having made 18 appearances and scoring once.

Barnett's first appearance of the 2012–13 season was in a 1–1 draw with Queens Park Rangers on 25 August 2012. He made a further seven Premier League appearances, before featuring in three successive cup matches, the last of which was a 1–0 home defeat to former club Luton Town in the FA Cup fourth round on 26 January 2013, the first time a non-League club had knocked a Premier League club out of the FA Cup since 1989. On transfer deadline day, it appeared Barnett was no longer in the future plans of manager Chris Hughton, after he was offered as part of a bid in an attempt to sign Birmingham City defender Curtis Davies.

==== Cardiff City (loan) ====
On 14 March 2013, Barnett completed a one-month loan move to Championship club Cardiff City as a replacement for injured captain Mark Hudson. Barnett made his debut for the club two days later in a 2–0 away win over Sheffield Wednesday. The loan was extended until the end of the season on 12 April. He formed a defensive partnership with Ben Turner during his spell at the club, making eight appearances, as Cardiff won the Championship title and promotion to the Premier League. After the league championship was secured, Barnett was recalled by Norwich on 24 April to cover for injuries to Michael Turner and Steven Whittaker.

=== Wigan Athletic ===
On 1 August 2013, Barnett signed a three-year contract with newly relegated Championship club Wigan Athletic, transferring from Norwich City for an undisclosed fee. He scored on his debut in a 4–0 away win over Barnsley on the opening day of the 2013–14 season. Barnett started in a 2–0 defeat to Manchester United in the FA Community Shield at Wembley Stadium one week later. His second goal for the club came with a 90th-minute equaliser in a 2–2 draw with Doncaster Rovers on 20 August 2013. Barnett later made his Europa League debut in a 3–1 home win over NK Maribor on 8 October 2013. He scored his first Europa League goal in a 2–1 home defeat to Zulte Waregem on 28 November 2013. Wigan secured a place in the Championship play-offs after a 1–0 away win over Birmingham City on 29 April 2014, during which Barnett replaced Shaun Maloney as a 90th-minute substitute. A 2–1 defeat to Queens Park Rangers in the play-off semi-final second leg ended Wigan's hopes of an instant return to the Premier League after a 96th-minute winning goal from Charlie Austin, before which Barnett replaced Gary Caldwell as a 74th-minute substitute. Barnett ended his first season with the club having made 53 appearances and scoring five goals in all competitions.

Barnett began the 2014–15 season by playing the full 90 minutes in a 2–1 away defeat to League Two club Burton Albion in the League Cup first round on 12 August 2014. He remained an unused substitute for the majority of August and September, with the exception of substitute appearances in a 4–0 home win over Birmingham City on 30 August, a 2–0 away defeat to AFC Bournemouth on 27 September, prior to a 0–0 draw with Nottingham Forest three days later, during which he replaced the injured Emmerson Boyce. Barnett played every minute of Wigan's matches in October, before receiving a red card for tripping over Hugo Rodallega in the penalty area in a 3–3 draw with Fulham on 1 November. After serving his suspension, Barnett returned to the starting lineup and was an ever-present in the team, up to and including a 2–1 home defeat to Rotherham United on 20 December. However, his sequence of starting appearances was ended by a hamstring injury which resulted in his absence from a 2–0 away win over Leeds United and the subsequent two matches. He returned to first-team football on 10 January 2015 in a 3–1 away defeat to Birmingham City, replacing the injured Iván Ramis in the 66th minute. Subsequently, Barnett made a further five starting appearances during January and February, before another injury saw him return to the sidelines for a 1–0 away win over Reading on 17 February 2015. Upon his return from injury, he was named on the substitutes bench for the remainder of the season, thus ending the season having made 21 appearances in all competitions.

Wigan were relegated to League One at the end of the 2014–15 season, and Barnett's first appearance of 2015–16 came in the League Cup first round against League One rivals Bury, which resulted in a 2–1 home defeat. He scored Wigan's first goal during a 3–2 away win over Chesterfield on 5 September 2015 to begin a comeback from 2–0 down in the final 10 minutes. Barnett was sent off for a professional foul in Wigan's next match, a 3–2 away defeat to Port Vale one week later. Following his return from suspension, Barnett made eight consecutive starting appearances during September and October, but was dropped to the bench and remained an unused substitute during a 1–0 home win over Swindon Town on 31 October 2015. He was named in the starting lineup on eight further occasions, and finished the season with 24 appearances in all competitions. Barnett was not included in the matchday squad for Wigan's 4–0 away win over Blackpool, which secured their instant return to the Championship, before remaining an unused substitute in a 4–1 home defeat to Barnsley on the final day of the season which secured Wigan the League One title despite the result. On 3 June 2016, Wigan announced that Barnett would be released upon the expiry of his contract at the end of 2015–16.

=== Bury ===
Barnett signed a two-year contract with League One club Bury on 19 July 2016. He made his debut in a 1–0 home defeat to Oldham Athletic on 20 August 2016, during which he scored an own goal. One week later, Barnett scored first goal for Bury to begin a second half comeback from 3–0 down to earn a 3–3 draw away to Walsall. He suffered an injury in September 2016, and returned to the team for a 2–0 defeat at home to Bolton Wanderers on 24 October. Barnett was later ruled out through injury once more with a calf strain, and returned to the team almost three months later for a 1–0 victory at home to Swindon Town on 11 February 2017. He consolidated his place in the starting lineup, and finished 2016–17 with 26 appearances and one goal.

=== Northampton Town ===
On 31 May 2017, Barnett signed a two-year contract with League One club Northampton Town on a free transfer. He signed a new one-year contract with Northampton in June 2018, with the option of a further year. Barnett retired from playing on 26 November 2018, as a result of a heart condition. During a League Cup fixture against Wycombe Wanderers, he complained to the club's physio of a high heart rate and feeling tired, stating "My heart felt like I was doing 10 box-to-box runs, but I was literally just jogging". He was sent to a cardiologist and was fitted with a heart rate monitor and, after a second incident in a match against Bury in October 2018, test results showed that his heart rate was reaching dangerous levels of 300 bpm. He was fitted with a pacemaker after being diagnosed with myocarditis and was advised that continuing his playing career would be unsafe. He subsequently announced his retirement with Northampton honouring the remainder of his contract and offering him the opportunity to work at the club to gain coaching experience.

== Coaching career ==
Following his retirement from playing, Barnett started a football academy in the Luton area.

== Personal life ==
Barnett married Kylie Baldry in 2015 and the pair have three children together.

== Career statistics ==
Appearances and goals by club, season and competition
Club	Season	League			FA Cup		League Cup		Europe		Other		Total	
Club	Season	Division	Apps	Goals	Apps	Goals	Apps	Goals	Apps	Goals	Apps	Goals	Apps	Goals
Luton Town	2002–03	Second Division	0	0	0	0	0	0	—		1 (Note: Appearance(s) in Football League Trophy)	0	1	0
Luton Town	2003–04	Second Division	0	0	1	0	0	0	—		2	0	3	0
Luton Town	2004–05	League One	0	0	0	0	0	0	—		1	0	1	0
Luton Town	2005–06	Championship	20	0	1	0	1	0	—		—		22	0
Luton Town	2006–07	Championship	39	3	1	0	3	0	—		—		43	3
Luton Town	Total		59	3	3	0	4	0	—		4	0	70	3
Aylesbury United (loan)	2004–05	Southern League Premier Division	5	0	0	0	—		—		1 (Note: Appearance in FA Trophy)	0	6	0
West Bromwich Albion	2007–08	Championship	32	3	4	0	0	0	—		—		36	3
West Bromwich Albion	2008–09	Premier League	11	0	2	0	1	0	—		—		14	0
West Bromwich Albion	2009–10	Championship	2	0	0	0	3	0	—		—		5	0
West Bromwich Albion	2010–11	Premier League	0	0	—		1	0	—		—		1	0
West Bromwich Albion	Total		45	3	6	0	5	0	—		—		56	3
Coventry City (loan)	2009–10	Championship	20	0	—		—		—		—		20	0
Norwich City	2010–11	Championship	25	1	1	0	—		—		—		26	1
Norwich City	2011–12	Premier League	17	1	1	0	0	0	—		—		18	1
Norwich City	2012–13	Premier League	8	0	2	0	1	0	—		—		11	0
Norwich City	Total		50	2	4	0	1	0	—		—		55	2
Cardiff City (loan)	2012–13	Championship	8	0	—		—		—		—		8	0
Wigan Athletic	2013–14	Championship	41	4	4	0	1	0	5 (Note: Appearances in UEFA Europa League)	1	2 (Note: One appearance in FA Community Shield, one in Championship play-offs)	0	53	5
Wigan Athletic	2014–15	Championship	20	0	0	0	1	0	—		—		21	0
Wigan Athletic	2015–16	League One	20	1	0	0	1	0	—		3	0	24	1
Wigan Athletic	Total		81	5	4	0	3	0	5	1	5	0	98	6
Bury	2016–17	League One	24	1	1	0	0	0	—		1 (Note: Appearance(s) in EFL Trophy)	0	26	1
Northampton Town	2017–18	League One	15	1	0	0	1	0	—		2	0	18	1
Northampton Town	2018–19	League Two	4	0	0	0	1	0	—		1	0	6	0
Northampton Town	Total		19	1	0	0	2	0	—		3	0	24	1
Career total			311	15	18	0	15	0	5	1	14	0	363	16

== Honours ==
West Bromwich Albion

- Football League Championship: 2007–08

Norwich City

- Football League Championship second-place promotion: 2010–11

Wigan Athletic

- Football League One: 2015–16

Individual

- Luton Town Player of the Season: 2006–07
