= 2015–16 Wigan Athletic F.C. season =

Wigan Athletic
2015–16 season
- Owner: Dave Whelan
- Chairman: David Sharpe
- Manager: Gary Caldwell
- Stadium: DW Stadium
- League One: 1st (champions)
- FA Cup: First round
- League Cup: First round
- Football League Trophy: Area semi-finals
- Top goalscorer: League: (25); Will Grigg; All: (28); Will Grigg
- Highest home attendance: 18,730 (vs. Barnsley)
- Lowest home attendance: 7,794 (vs. Scunthorpe United)
- Average home league attendance: 9,467
Home colours	Away colours	Third colours

The 2015–16 season was Wigan Athletic's 84th year in existence and their first back in League One, since the 2002–03 season, after being relegated the previous season. Along with competing in League One, the club also participated in the FA Cup, League Cup and Football League Trophy. The season covers the period from 1 July 2015 to 30 June 2016.

== Transfers ==
=== Transfers in ===
Date from	Position	Nationality	Name	From	Fee	Ref.
1 July 2015	CB	ENG	Donervon Daniels	West Bromwich Albion	Undisclosed	
1 July 2015	CB	WAL	Craig Morgan	Rotherham United	Free transfer	
1 July 2015	DM	ENG	David Perkins	Blackpool	Free transfer	
1 July 2015	GK	ENG	Richard O'Donnell	Walsall	Free transfer	
3 July 2015	RM	ENG	Max Power	Tranmere Rovers	Tribunal	
6 July 2015	LW	ENG	Sanmi Odelusi	Bolton Wanderers	£50,000	
7 July 2015	CF	WAL	Craig Davies	Bolton Wanderers	Free transfer	
14 July 2015	CF	NIR	Will Grigg	Brentford	£1,000,000	
21 July 2015	LB	ENG	Reece James	Manchester United	Undisclosed	
27 July 2015	LM	ENG	Michael Jacobs	Wolverhampton Wanderers	Undisclosed	
4 August 2015	RB	SCO	Kevin McNaughton	Cardiff City	Free transfer	
11 August 2015	GK	FIN	Jussi Jääskeläinen	West Ham United	Free transfer	
1 September 2015	DF	ENG	Andy Kellett	Bolton Wanderers	Undisclosed	
1 September 2015	DF	SCO	Jack Hendry	Partick Thistle	Undisclosed	
6 January 2016	GK	ENG	Dan Lavercombe	Torquay United	Undisclosed	
6 January 2016	MF	NED	Yanic Wildschut	Middlesbrough	Undisclosed	
8 January 2016	MF	ENG	Danny Whitehead	Macclesfield Town	Undisclosed	
14 January 2016	DF	ENG	Reece Wabara	Barnsley	Free	
28 January 2016	MF	ENG	Sam Morsy	Chesterfield	Undisclosed	
28 January 2016	FW	ENG	Ryan Colclough	Crewe Alexandra	Undisclosed	

Total spending: ▼£1,050,000

=== Transfers out ===
Date from	Position	Nationality	Name	To	Fee	Ref.
1 July 2015	GK	OMA	Ali Al-Habsi	Reading (Note: Following Al-Habsi's release he joined Reading.)	Free transfer	
1 July 2015	AM	KOR	Kim Bo-kyung	Free agent	Released	
1 July 2015	LB	CMR	Gaëtan Bong	Brighton & Hove Albion (Note: Following Bong's release he joined Brighton & Hove Albion.)	Free transfer	
1 July 2015	RB	BAR	Emmerson Boyce	Blackpool (Note: Following Boyce's release he joined Blackpool.)	Released	
1 July 2015	GK	ENG	Scott Carson	Derby County	Undisclosed	
1 July 2015	CF	GYF	Marc-Antoine Fortuné	Coventry City (Note: Following Fortuné's release he Joined Coventry City.)	Free transfer	
1 July 2015	CB	IRL	Rob Kiernan	Rangers	Undisclosed	
1 July 2015	DM	DEN	William Kvist	Copenhagen (Note: Following Kvist's release he joined Copenhagen.)	Released	
1 July 2015	LW	IRE	James McClean	West Bromwich Albion	£1,500,000	
1 July 2015	RW	ENG	Jermaine Pennant	Free agent	Released	
1 July 2015	CF	ESP	Oriol Riera	Deportivo La Coruña	Undisclosed	
2 July 2015	CF	FRA	Andy Delort	SM Caen	Undisclosed	
20 July 2015	RB	ENG	James Tavernier	Rangers	Undisclosed	
20 July 2015	LB	SCO	Aaron Taylor-Sinclair	Doncaster Rovers	Undisclosed	
20 July 2015	CF	ENG	Martyn Waghorn	Rangers	Undisclosed	
31 July 2015	RB	ENG	James Perch	Queens Park Rangers	Undisclosed	
1 February 2016	MF	SCO	Don Cowie	Heart of Midlothian	Undisclosed	
1 February 2016	GK	ENG	Richard O'Donnell	Bristol City	Undisclosed	

Total incoming: £1,500,000 ▲

=== Loans in ===
Date from	Position	Nationality	Name	From	Date until	Ref.
21 July 2015	CM	POR	Francisco Júnior	Everton	16 January 2016 (Note: Júnior's loan was extended on 21 August 2015, until 16 January 2016.)	
21 July 2015	RB	ENG	Jonjoe Kenny	Everton	22 September 2015	
5 August 2015	AM	IRL	Sean Murray	Watford	16 January 2016 (Note: Murray's loan was extended on 1 September 2015, until 16 January 2016.)	
14 August 2015	SS	ENG	Shaq Coulthirst	Tottenham Hotspur	1 November 2015	
27 August 2015	CF	ENG	Jordy Hiwula	Huddersfield Town	End of season	
1 September 2015	AM	SLO	Haris Vučkić	Newcastle United	End of season	
2 October 2015	DF	SCO	Donald Love	Manchester United	December 2015	
2 October 2015	MF	NED	Yanic Wildschut	Middlesbrough	January 2016	
12 November 2015	ST	ENG	Alex Revell	Cardiff City	23 January 2016	
1 February 2016	ST	ENG	Conor McAleny	Everton	End of season	
7 March 2016	DF	ENG	Stephen Warnock	Derby County	End of season	

=== Loans out ===
Date from	Position	Nationality	Name	To	Date until	Ref.
5 August 2015	LB	ENG	Andrew Taylor	Reading	End of season	
18 August 2015	CF	ENG	Sam Cosgrove	Barrow	19 September 2015	
27 August 2015	DM	WAL	Emyr Huws	Huddersfield Town	End of season	
28 August 2015	CF	NIR	Billy Mckay	Dundee United	End of season	
11 September 2015	GK	ENG	Lee Nicholls	Bristol Rovers	11 December 2015	
18 September 2015	CF	IRL	Matthew Hamilton	Stockport County	16 October 2015	
31 October 2015	ST	ENG	Grant Holt	Wolverhampton Wanderers	2 January 2016	
12 November 2015	MF	ENG	Ryan Jennings	Cheltenham Town	12 December 2015	
6 January 2016	GK	ENG	Dan Lavercombe	Torquay United	End of season	
8 January 2016	MF	ENG	Danny Whitehead	Macclesfield Town	End of season	
15 February 2016	MF	ENG	Ryan Jennings	Grimsby Town	End of season	
23 March 2016	DF	SCO	Jack Hendry	Shrewsbury Town	End of season	
24 March 2016	ST	ENG	Louis Robles	Gloucester City	End of season	

=== Pre-season friendlies ===
On 15 May 2015, it was announced that Wigan Athletic would face Altrincham, Southport, Partick Thistle, Dundee and Blackburn Rovers as part of their pre-season schedule.

8 July 2015 Training Match	Wigan Athletic	2–1	Queen of the South	La Manga, Spain
18:00 CEST	Trialist (Ball) 1'; Power 20'	Report	61'	Attendance: 102

11 July 2015 Training Match	Wigan Athletic	2–1	Hibernian	La Manga, Spain
18:00 CEST	Waghorn (?), 89'	Report	Fyvie	Attendance: 128

14 July 2015 Friendly	Altrincham	1–1	Wigan Athletic	Altrincham
19:45 BST	Rankine 37'	Report	Mckay 27'	Stadium: Moss Lane

18 July 2015 Friendly	Southport	0–2	Wigan Athletic	Blowick
15:00 BST		Report	Beesley 45' (o.g.); Trialist (o.g.)	Stadium: Merseyrail Community Stadium; Attendance: 1,800 approx. (1,300 away)

21 July 2015 Friendly	Partick Thistle	1–1	Wigan Athletic	Maryhill, Scotland
19:30 BST	Lawless 47'	Report	Jennings 51'	Stadium: Firhill Stadium; Attendance: 1,284 (149 away)

24 July 2015 Friendly	Dundee	1–0	Wigan Athletic	Dundee, Scotland
19:00 BST	Loy 70'	Report		Stadium: Dens Park; Attendance: 2,194 (226 away)

1 August 2015 Friendly	Blackburn Rovers	3–0	Wigan Athletic	Blackburn
15:00 BST	Tomlinson 74'; Hanley 83'; Marshall 89'	Report		Stadium: Ewood Park

== Competitions ==
=== Overall record ===
Competition	First match	Last match	Starting round	Final position	Record							
Competition	First match	Last match	Starting round	Final position	Pld	W	D	L	GF	GA	GD	Win %
League One	8 August 2015	8 May 2016	Matchday 1	1st	46	24	15	7	82	45	+37	52.17
FA Cup	7 November 2015	7 November 2015	First round	First round	1	0	0	1	0	4	−4	0.00
EFL Cup	11 August 2015	11 August 2015	First round	First round	1	0	0	1	1	2	−1	0.00
EFL Trophy	6 October 2015	5 December 2015	Second round	Area Semi-final	3	2	0	1	9	4	+5	66.67
Total					51	26	15	10	92	55	+37	50.98

Last updated: 8 May 2016

=== League One ===
==== League table ====
Pos	Team	Pld	W	D	L	GF	GA	GD	Pts	Promotion, qualification or relegation
1	Wigan Athletic (C, P)	46	24	15	7	82	45	+37	87	Promotion to EFL Championship
2	Burton Albion (P)	46	25	10	11	57	37	+20	85	Promotion to EFL Championship
3	Walsall	46	24	12	10	71	49	+22	84	Qualification for the League One play-offs (Note: Four teams play for one spot and promotion to Football League Championship.)
4	Millwall	46	24	9	13	73	49	+24	81	Qualification for the League One play-offs
5	Bradford City	46	23	11	12	55	40	+15	80	Qualification for the League One play-offs

Updated to match(es) played on 1 July 2016. Source: BBC Sport
Rules for classification: 1) Points; 2) Goal difference; 3) Number of goals scored
(C) Champions; (P) Promoted

==== Results by matchday ====
Matchday	1	2	3	4	5	6	7	8	9	10	11	12	13	14	15	16	17	18	19	20	21	22	23	24	25	26	27	28	29	30	31	32	33	34	35	36	37	38	39	40	41	42	43	44	45	46
Ground	A	H	H	A	H	A	A	H	A	H	H	A	H	A	A	H	A	H	A	A	H	A	A	A	H	H	H	A	H	A	H	A	H	A	H	A	H	A	H	A	H	A	A	H	A	H
Result	L	D	W	L	W	W	L	W	D	D	D	D	W	W	D	W	W	W	L	D	L	W	W	D	W	D	W	D	W	W	D	W	W	D	D	D	W	W	W	W	W	L	D	W	W	L
Position	22	23	11	13	11	9	10	8	9	9	9	10	8	7	5	5	5	4	5	5	6	5	5	5	5	5	5	4	4	3	4	2	2	2	2	2	2	2	2	1	1	1	1	1	1	1

Updated to match(es) played on 8 May 2016. Source:
A = Away; H = Home; W = Win; D = Draw; L = Loss

==== Matches ====
On 17 June 2015, the fixtures for the forthcoming season were announced.

8 August 2015 1	Coventry City	2–0	Wigan Athletic	Coventry
15:00 BST	Armstrong 15', 62'	Report		Stadium: Ricoh Arena; Attendance: 13,131; Referee: Scott Duncan

16 August 2015 2	Wigan Athletic	0–0	Doncaster Rovers	Wigan
12:30 BST		Report		Stadium: DW Stadium; Attendance: 8,813; Referee: David Webb

19 August 2015 3	Wigan Athletic	3–0	Scunthorpe United	Wigan
19:45 BST	Grigg 3' (pen.); Daniels 27'; Davies 70'	Report		Stadium: DW Stadium; Attendance: 7,794; Referee: Andy Madley

22 August 2015 4	Gillingham	2–0	Wigan Athletic	Gillingham
15:00 BST	Dack 37', 82' (pen.)	Report		Stadium: Priestfield Stadium; Attendance: 5,692; Referee: Iain Williamson

29 August 2015 5	Wigan Athletic	1–0	Crewe Alexandra	Wigan
15:00 BST	Jacobs 12'	Report		Stadium: DW Stadium; Attendance: 8,647; Referee: David Coote

5 September 2015 6	Chesterfield	2–3	Wigan Athletic	Chesterfield
15:00 BST	Gardner 62'; Barnett 68' (o.g.)	Report	Barnett 81'; Davies 87' (pen.); Hiwula-Mayifuila 90'	Stadium: Proact Stadium; Attendance: 7,145; Referee: Mark Brown

12 September 2015 7	Port Vale	3–2	Wigan Athletic	Burslem
15:00 BST	Grant 34'; Dodds 64'; Ikpeazu 90'	Report	McCann 66'; Barnett 83' (red card) 88'	Stadium: Vale Park; Attendance: 5,953; Referee: Mark Haywood

19 September 2015 8	Wigan Athletic	2–1	Fleetwood Town	Wigan
15:00 BST	Flores 39'; Jacobs 47'	Report	Hornby-Forbes 61'	Stadium: DW Stadium; Attendance: 8,603; Referee: Fred Graham

27 September 2015 9	Oldham Athletic	1–1	Wigan Athletic	Oldham
15:00 BST	Poleon 74'	Report	Power 34'	Stadium: Boundary Park; Attendance: 5,482; Referee: Darren Handley

30 September 2015 10	Wigan Athletic	2–2	Millwall	Wigan
19:45 BST	Jacobs 54'; Grigg 90+2'	Report	Onyedinma 69'; Beevers 74'	Stadium: DW Stadium; Attendance: 7,991; Referee: Geoff Eltringham

4 October 2015 11	Wigan Athletic	0–0	Walsall	Wigan
15:00 BST		Report		Stadium: DW Stadium; Attendance: 8,636; Referee: Andy Haines

10 October 2015 12	Bury	2–2	Wigan Athletic	Bury
15:00 BST	Cameron 6'; Pope 60'	Report	Cameron 54' (o.g.); Morgan 90'	Stadium: Gigg Lane; Attendance: 5,931; Referee: Graham Salisbury

17 October 2015 13	Wigan Athletic	5–0	Colchester United	Wigan
15:00 BST	Daniels 5', 14'; Grigg 33', 87'; Power 11'	Report		Stadium: DW Stadium; Attendance: 8,048; Referee: Steve Martin

20 October 2015 14	Peterborough United	2–3	Wigan Athletic	Peterborough
19:45 BST	Oztumer 61'; Coulibaly 81'	Report	Wildschut 11'; Grigg 15'; Power 82'	Stadium: London Road; Attendance: 4,765; Referee: Oliver Langford

24 October 2015 15	Bradford City	1–1	Wigan Athletic	Bradford
15:00 BST	Hanson 63'	Report	Jacobs 52'	Stadium: Valley Parade; Attendance: 19,171; Referee: Richard Clark

31 October 2015 16	Wigan Athletic	1–0	Swindon Town	Wigan
15:00 GMT	Júnior 90+5'	Report		Stadium: DW Stadium; Attendance: 8,466; Referee: Nigel Miller

14 November 2015 17	Rochdale	0–2	Wigan Athletic	Rochdale
12:30 GMT		Report	Pearce 16'; Jacobs 61'	Stadium: Spotland Stadium; Attendance: 3,835; Referee: Neil Swarbrick

21 November 2015 18	Wigan Athletic	1–0	Shrewsbury Town	Wigan
15:00 GMT	Revell 36'	Report		Stadium: DW Stadium; Attendance: 8,803; Referee: Darren Deadman

24 November 2015 19	Wigan	0–1	Burton Albion	Wigan
19:45 GMT		Report	El Khayati 74'	Stadium: DW Stadium; Attendance: 8,117; Referee: Mark Haywood

28 November 2015 20	Southend United	0–0	Wigan	Southend-on-Sea
15:00 GMT		Report		Stadium: Roots Hall; Attendance: 7,117; Referee: Keith Stroud

12 December 2015 21	Wigan Athletic	0–1	Blackpool	Wigan
15:00 GMT		Report	Aldred 36'	Stadium: DW Stadium; Attendance: 8,424; Referee: Phil Gibbs

19 December 2015 22	Barnsley	0–2	Wigan Athletic	Barnsley
15:00 GMT		Report	Kellett 18'; Wildschut 86'	Stadium: Oakwell; Attendance: 8,866; Referee: Seb Stockbridge

28 December 2015 23	Fleetwood Town	1–3	Wigan Athletic	Fleetwood
15:00 GMT	Bell (yellow card) 54'; Pond (yellow card) 58'; Ryan (yellow card) 60'; Sarcevic 69' (pen.); Davis (yellow card) 71'	Report	Power (yellow card) 18'; Kellett 39'; Love (yellow card) 56'; Morgan (yellow card) 57'; Hiwula 83' (yellow card) 84'; Grigg (yellow card) 89'; Jacobs 90+3'	Stadium: Highbury Stadium; Attendance: 4,232; Referee: (England) Carl Boyeson

2 January 2016 24	Scunthorpe United	1–1	Wigan Athletic	Scunthorpe
15:00 GMT	Williams 20'; Clarke (yellow card) 65'	Report	Jacobs 34'; Power (yellow card) 79'	Stadium: Glanford Park; Attendance: 4,102; Referee: (England) Chris Sarginson

7 January 2016 25	Wigan Athletic	3–2	Gillingham	Wigan
19:45 GMT	Jacobs (yellow card) 60'; Grigg 64'; Power 67' (yellow card) 90+1'; Morgan 90+6'	Report	Samuel 24'; Donelly 53'; McGlashan (yellow card) 90+3'	Stadium: DW Stadium; Attendance: 7,923; Referee: (England) Scott Duncan (referee)

12 January 2016 26	Wigan Athletic	3–3	Sheffield United	Wigan
19:45 GMT	Grigg 16'; Perkins (yellow card) 30'; Daniels (yellow card) 40'; Vučkić 43'; McCann 66'; Power (yellow card) 87'	Report	Hammond (yellow card) 36'; Collins (yellow card) 47'; Sharp (yellow card) 59' (goal) 75'; Done 68' 89'	Stadium: DW Stadium; Attendance: 10,113; Referee: (England) Andy Woolmer

16 January 2016 27	Wigan Athletic	3–1	Chesterfield	Wigan
15:00 GMT	Power 6'; James 38'; Jacobs 39'; Perkins (yellow card) 77'; Jääskeläinen (yellow card) 90'	Report	O'Neil (yellow card) 35'; Herd (yellow card) 45+3'; Banks 79'	Stadium: DW Stadium; Attendance: 9,091; Referee: (England) Ross Joyce

23 January 2016 28	Crewe Alexandra	1–1	Wigan Athletic	Crewe
15:00 GMT	Inman 43'; Cooper (yellow card) 63'	Report	Wabara 16'; Perkins (yellow card) 47'; McCann (yellow card) 53'; Power (yellow card) 59'	Stadium: Alexandra Stadium; Attendance: 6,010; Referee: (England) Nick Kinseley

30 January 2016 29	Wigan Athletic	3–0	Port Vale	Wigan
15:00 GMT	Grigg 7' 41' (pen.) 69'	Report	McGivern (red card) 39'; Duffy (yellow card) 84'	Stadium: DW Stadium; Attendance: 9,627; Referee: (England) Darren Drysdale

6 February 2016 30	Sheffield United	0–2	Wigan Athletic	Sheffield
15:00 GMT	Hammond (yellow card) 71'; Sharp (yellow card) 79'	Report	Grigg 52' (pen.); McAleny 55'	Stadium: Bramall Lane; Attendance: 20,304; Referee: (England) Steve Martin

13 February 2016 31	Wigan Athletic	0–0	Oldham Athletic	Wigan
15:00 GMT	Pearce (yellow card) 31'; Morgan (yellow card) 69'	Summary	Gerrard (yellow card) 18'	Stadium: DW Stadium; Attendance: 9,817; Referee: (England) Neil Miller

20 February 2016 32	Walsall	1–2	Wigan Athletic	Walsall
15:00 GMT	Mantom (yellow card) 6' (goal) 68'; Lalkovič (yellow card) 10'; Chambers (yellow card) 44'; Preston (yellow card) 65'; Demetriou (yellow card) 90+4'	Report	Perkins (yellow card) 14'; McAleny 39'; Wildschut 90+1'	Stadium: Banks's Stadium; Attendance: 6,740; Referee: (England) Ian Williamson

27 February 2016 33	Wigan Athletic	3–0	Bury	Wigan
15:00 GMT	Grigg 7' 21' (pen.); Colclough 9'; Davies (yellow card) 90+5'	Report	Lowe (yellow card) 37'; Tutte (yellow card) 90+5'; Mayor (yellow card) 90+5'; Jones (yellow card) 90+6'	Stadium: DW Stadium; Attendance: 9,490; Referee: (England) Scott Duncan (referee)

1 March 2016 34	Millwall	0–0	Wigan Athletic	London
19:45 GMT	Martin (yellow card) 31'; Webster (yellow card) 42'	Report	Morsy (yellow card) 28' (yellow-red card) 34'; Wabara (yellow card) 67'; Barnett (yellow card) 77'	Stadium: The Den; Attendance: 7,981; Referee: (England) Lee Collins

5 March 2016 35	Wigan Athletic	1–1	Peterborough United	Wigan
15:00 GMT	Grigg 71'; McCann (yellow card) 85'	Report	Baldwin (yellow card) 26'; Beautyman (yellow card) 54'; Maddison (yellow card) 79' (goal) 80'; Gillett (yellow card) 82'	Stadium: DW Stadium; Attendance: 8,877; Referee: (England) Geoff Eltringham

12 March 2016 36	Colchester United	3–3	Wigan Athletic	Colchester
15:00 GMT	Gilbey 40'; Lee 50'; Moncur 60' (pen.); Chambers (yellow card) 69'; Edwards (yellow card) 77'	Report	Wildschut 36'; Colclough 44'; Grigg 90'	Stadium: Weston Homes Community Stadium; Attendance: 3,761; Referee: (England) Kevin Johnson

19 March 2016 37	Wigan Athletic	1–0	Bradford City	Wigan
15:00 GMT	Vuckic 80'			Stadium: DW Stadium; Attendance: 10,890

25 March 2016 38	Swindon Town	1–4	Wigan Athletic	Swindon
17:30 GMT	Barry (yellow card) 62'; Ajose 79'; Thompson (red card) 86'	Report	Grigg 15' 50'; Power (yellow card) 40' (goal) 47'; Morsy 51'; Davies (yellow card) 74'	Stadium: County Ground; Attendance: 9,240; Referee: (England) Andy Davies

28 March 2016 39	Wigan Athletic	1–0	Rochdale	Wigan
13:30 GMT	Perkins (yellow card) 29'; Pearce (yellow card) 34'; McAleny 67'	Report	Henderson (red card) 33'; McNulty (yellow card) 70'; Rafferty (yellow card) 74'	Stadium: DW Stadium; Attendance: 10,407; Referee: (England) Mark Brown

2 April 2016 40	Shrewsbury Town	1–5	Wigan Athletic	Shrewsbury
15:00 GMT	Kaikai 28'; Whitbread (red card) 66'	Report	McAleny 33'; Wildschut 57'; Pearce 61'; Grigg 66' (pen.) 90+3'	Stadium: Greenhous Meadow; Attendance: 7,010; Referee: (England) Nick Kinseley

9 April 2016 41	Wigan Athletic	1–0	Coventry City	Wigan
15:00 GMT	Grigg 57'	Report	Cole (yellow card) 59'; Murphy (yellow card) 90+3'	Stadium: DW Stadium; Attendance: 10,415; Referee: (England) Dean Whitestone

16 April 2016 42	Doncaster Rovers	3–1	Wigan Athletic	Doncaster
15:00 GMT	Chaplow (yellow card) 28'; McSheffrey (yellow card) 48'; Butler 50' 54' (yellow card) 60'; Williams 88' (pen.)	Report	Grigg 41' (yellow card) 57'; Jacobs (yellow card) 79'; Perkins (red card) 86'	Stadium: Keepmoat Stadium; Referee: (England) Kevin Johnson

19 April 2016 43	Burton Albion	1–1	Wigan Athletic	Burton upon Trent
19:45 GMT	Edwards (yellow card) 8'; Akins (yellow card) 17'; Naylor 38' (yellow card) 55'; Reilly (yellow card) 90'	Report	Jacobs 8'; McCann (yellow card) 81'; Power (yellow card) 85'	Stadium: Pirelli Stadium; Attendance: 5,461; Referee: (England) Simon Hooper

23 April 2016 44	Wigan Athletic	4–1	Southend United	Wigan
15:00 GMT	McCann 9'; Grigg 17' 36'; Jacobs 50'	Report	Worrall (yellow card) 54'; Deegan (yellow card) 57'; Morgan 74' (o.g.)	Stadium: DW Stadium; Attendance: 10,021; Referee: Darren England

30 April 2016 45	Blackpool	0–4	Wigan Athletic	Blackpool
15:00 GMT		Report	McCann 60' Wildschut 70, 72 Grigg 85'	Stadium: Bloomfield Road; Attendance: 9,226; Referee: Stuart Attwell

8 May 2016 46	Wigan Athletic	1–4	Barnsley	Wigan
12:30 GMT	Grigg 10'; Perkins (yellow card) 34'; McCann (red card) 90+4'	Report	Winnall 33' (pen.) 44'; Hourihane 56'; Brownhill 74'; Hammill (yellow card) 90+4'	Stadium: DW Stadium; Attendance: 18,730; Referee: (England) Tony Harrington

=== League Cup ===
On 16 June 2015, the first round draw was made, Wigan Athletic were drawn at home against Bury.

11 August 2015 First round	Wigan Athletic	1–2	Bury	Wigan
19:45 BST	Grigg 46' (pen.)	Report	Clarke 63', 89' (pen.)	Stadium: DW Stadium; Attendance: 5,484; Referee: Mark Heywood

=== Football League Trophy ===
On 5 September 2015, the second round draw was shown live on Soccer AM and drawn by Charlie Austin and Ed Skrein. Wigan will go to Crewe Alexandra.

6 October 2015 Second round	Crewe Alexandra	2–3	Wigan Athletic	Crewe
19:45 BST	Haber 6'; Colclough 36'	Report	Hiwula-Mayifuila 10', 70'; Wildschut 76'	Stadium: Gresty Road; Attendance: 2,168 (600 away); Referee: James Adcock

10 November 2015 Third round	Wigan Athletic	4–0	Blackpool	Wigan
19:45 GMT	Hiwula-Mayifuila 20', 78' (pen.); Murray 63'; Wildschut 71'	Report		Stadium: DW Stadium; Attendance: 5,226; Referee: Andy Madley

5 December 2015 Area Semi Final	Wigan Athletic	2–2 (2–4 p)	Barnsley	Wigan
15:00	Hendry (yellow card) 58'; Flores (yellow card) 70'; Grigg 48' 82'	Report	Hourihane (yellow card) 16'; Hammill 42'; Pearson (yellow card) 71'; Toney 53' (yellow card) 76'; Winnall (yellow card) 81'	Stadium: DW Stadium; Attendance: 6,628; Referee: (England) Keith Hill

=== FA Cup ===
The First Round draw took place on 26 October at 7pm, drawing Wigan away to Bury, this game will take place on the 7 November.

7 November 2015 First round	Bury	4–0	Wigan Athletic	Bury
15:00	Pope 18'; Mayor 34'; Cameron 45'; Clarke 65'	Report		Stadium: Gigg Lane; Attendance: 3,856 (1,600 away); Referee: David Coote

=== Lancashire Senior Cup ===
On the Lancashire FA website the first round details were announced, Wigan Athletic will face Bolton Wanderers.

10 September 2015 First round	Wigan Athletic	3–2	Bolton Wanderers	Wigan
14:00 BST	Robles 7', 44', 82'	Report	Thomas 27'; Newell 73'	Stadium: Robin Park Arena; Attendance: 291; Referee: Darren Handley

8 December 2015 Quarter Final	Wigan Athletic	0–2	Accrington Stanley	Wigan
14:00 BST		Report	Kealan Steenson 10'; Carver 88'	Stadium: Robin Park Arena; Attendance: 211; Referee: Paul Hodskinson

== Squad statistics ==
=== Appearances ===
Last updated: 8 May 2016.

No.	Pos.	Name	League		FA Cup		League Cup		Johnstone Paint Trophy		Total	
No.	Pos.	Name	Apps	Goals	Apps	Goals	Apps	Goals	Apps	Goals	Apps	Goals
Goalkeepers
13	GK	(England) Lee Nicholls	1+1	0	0	0	0	0	0	0	1+1	0
32	GK	(Finland) Jussi Jääskeläinen	35	0	0	0	0	0	3	0	38	0
Defenders
2	LB	(England) Reece James	25+2	1	1	0	1	0	1	0	28+2	1
3	DF	(England) Andy Kellett	4+5	2	0	0	0	0	3	0	7+5	2
5	CB	(England) Donervon Daniels	40+2	3	1	0	0	0	1+1	0	42+3	3
20	CB	(Wales) Craig Morgan	36	2	1	0	1	0	0	0	38	2
21	LB	(Scotland) Kevin McNaughton	1+1	0	0	0	1	0	0	0	2+1	0
22	DF	(England) Stephen Warnock	11	0	0	0	0	0	0	0	11	0
23	LB	(Honduras) Juan Carlos García	0	0	0	0	0	0	0	0	0	0
25	CB	(England) Leon Barnett	16+4	2	0	0	1	0	3	0	20+4	2
28	CB	(England) Jason Pearce	29+2	2	0	0	0	0	2	0	31+2	2
33	DF	(Scotland) Jack Hendry	0	0	0	0	0	0	3	0	3	0
34	DF	(England) Reece Wabara	14+4	1	0	0	0	0	0	0	14+4	1
Midfielders
4	CM	(England) David Perkins	44+1	0	1	0	1	0	1	0	47+1	0
6	RM	(England) Max Power	43+1	6	0+1	0	1	0	2	0	46+2	6
7	CM	(Republic of Ireland) Chris McCann	31+7	4	1	0	0	0	1	0	32+7	4
8	MF	(England) Sam Morsy	13+3	1	0	0	0	0	0	0	13+3	1
11	LW	(England) Sanmi Odelusi	0+3	0	0	0	1	0	1	0	2+3	0
15	MF	(England) Jordan Flores	2+1	1	0	0	1	0	1+1	0	4+2	1
16	MF	(England) Ryan Jennings	0	0	0	0	0+1	0	0	0	0+1	0
17	RW	(England) Michael Jacobs	30+5	10	0+1	0	1	0	1	0	32+6	10
18	MF	(England) Tim Chow	3+8	0	0	0	0	0	1+1	0	4+9	0
29	MF	(Slovenia) Haris Vučkić	5+10	2	1	0	0	0	0+1	0	6+11	2
31	MF	(Netherlands) Yanic Wildschut	24+8	7	0+1	0	0	0	1+2	2	25+11	9
Attackers
9	ST	(England) Will Grigg	35+5	25	1	0	1	1	1	2	37+5	28
10	ST	(Wales) Craig Davies	7+19	2	1	0	0+1	0	1+1	0	9+21	2
24	FW	(England) Conor McAleny	9+4	4	0	0	0	0	0	0	9+4	4
27	FW	(England) Ryan Colclough	7+3	2	0	0	0	0	0	0	7+3	2
44	FW	(England) Louis Robles	0	0	0	0	0	0	0	0	0	0
Left club during season
26	DF	(England) Jonjoe Kenny	6+1	0	0	0	0	0	0	0	6+1	0
12	ST	(England) Shaq Coulthirst	0+2	0	0	0	0	0	0	0	0+2	0
24	MF	(Republic of Ireland) Sean Murray	2+5	0	0	0	0	0	1	1	3+5	1
12	ST	(England) Alex Revell	4+2	1	0	0	0	0	1	0	5+2	1
22	MF	(Portugal) Francisco Júnior	5+5	1	1	0	0	0	1	0	7+5	1
30	ST	(England) Jordy Hiwula	7+7	2	0	0	0	0	2	4	9+7	6
42	ST	(England) Grant Holt	0+4	0	0	0	0	0	0+1	0	0+5	0

=== Top scorers ===
Rank.	Pos.	No.	Name	League One	FA Cup	League Cup	Johnstone Paint Trophy	Total
Rank.	Pos.	No.	Name	Goals	Goals	Goals	Goals	Goals
1	ST	9	Will Grigg	25	0	1	2	28
2	MF	17	Michael Jacobs	10	0	0	0	10
3	MF	31	Yanic Wildschut	7	0	0	2	9
4	MF	6	Max Power	6	0	0	0	6
4	ST	30	Jordy Hiwula	2	0	0	4	6
5	FW	24	Conor McAleny	4	0	0	0	4
5	MF	7	Chris McCann	4	0	0	0	4
6	DF	5	Donervon Daniels	3	0	0	0	3
7	DF	3	Andy Kellett	2	0	0	0	2
7	DF	20	Craig Morgan	2	0	0	0	2
7	DF	25	Leon Barnett	2	0	0	0	2
7	DF	28	Jason Pearce	2	0	0	0	2
7	ST	10	Craig Davies	2	0	0	0	2
7	MF	29	Haris Vučkić	2	0	0	0	2
7	ST	27	Ryan Colclough	2	0	0	0	2
8	DF	2	Reece James	1	0	0	0	1
8	DF	34	Reece Wabara	1	0	0	0	1
8	MF	8	Sam Morsy	1	0	0	0	1
8	MF	15	Jordan Flores	1	0	0	0	1
8	MF	12	Alex Revell	1	0	0	0	1
8	MF	22	Francisco Júnior	1	0	0	0	1
Own goals				2	0	0	0	2

=== Disciplinary record ===
Includes all competitive matches.

Last updated 8 May 2016

Number	Nation	Position	Name	League One		FA Cup		League Cup		JPT		Total	
Number	Nation	Position	Name	Yellow card	Red card	Yellow card	Red card	Yellow card	Red card	Yellow card	Red card	Yellow card	Red card
7	(Republic of Ireland)	MF	Chris McCann	10	1	1	0	0	0	0	0	11	1
4	(England)	MF	David Perkins	10	1	0	0	0	0	0	0	10	1
20	(Wales)	DF	Craig Morgan	7	1	0	0	0	0	0	0	7	1
25	(England)	DF	Leon Barnett	1	1	0	0	0	0	0	0	1	1
8	(England)	MF	Sam Morsy	1	1	0	0	0	0	0	0	1	1
15	(England)	MF	Jordan Flores	1	1	0	0	0	0	0	0	1	1
6	(England)	MF	Max Power	10	0	0	0	0	0	1	0	11	0
5	(England)	DF	Donervon Daniels	4	0	1	0	0	0	0	0	5	0
22	(Portugal)	MF	Francisco Júnior	3	0	1	0	0	0	1	0	5	0
28	(England)	DF	Jason Pearce	4	0	0	0	0	0	0	0	4	0
10	(Wales)	ST	Craig Davies	3	0	0	0	1	0	0	0	4	0
26	(England)	DF	Jonjoe Kenny	3	0	0	0	0	0	0	0	3	0
17	(England)	MF	Michael Jacobs	3	0	0	0	0	0	0	0	3	0
9	(England)	ST	Will Grigg	2	0	0	0	0	0	0	0	2	0
25	(England)	DF	Leon Barnett	1	0	0	0	0	0	0	0	1	0
32	(Finland)	GK	Jussi Jääskeläinen	1	0	0	0	0	0	0	0	1	0
2	(England)	DF	Reece James	1	0	0	0	0	0	0	0	1	0
21	(Scotland)	DF	Kevin McNaughton	1	0	0	0	0	0	0	0	1	0
33	(Scotland)	DF	Jack Hendry	0	0	0	0	0	0	1	0	1	0
24	(Republic of Ireland)	MF	Sean Murray	0	0	0	0	0	0	1	0	1	0
			TOTAL	66	6	3	0	1	0	3	0	73	6
