= 2013–14 Wigan Athletic F.C. season =

Wigan Athletic
2013–14 season
- Chairman: Dave Whelan
- Manager: Owen Coyle (until 2 December 2013); Uwe Rösler (from 7 December 2013)
- Stadium: DW Stadium
- Championship: 5th
- Play-offs: Semi-finals
- FA Cup: Semi-finals
- League Cup: Third round
- UEFA Europa League: Group stage
- Community Shield: Runners-up
- Top goalscorer: League: Nick Powell, Jordi Gómez (7); All: Nick Powell (12)
- Highest home attendance: 19,226 vs. Bolton Wanderers
- Lowest home attendance: 12,970 vs. Yeovil Town (League); 12,753 vs NK Maribor (Europa League); 6,960 vs MK Dons (FA Cup)
| Home colours | Away colours | Third colours |

The 2013–14 season was Wigan Athletic's first season back in the Championship (and third overall) after the club's relegation from the Premier League at the end of the 2012–13 season, after eight consecutive seasons in the top flight. For winning the previous season's FA Cup, they competed in the Community Shield, losing to Manchester United, and the Europa League for the first time in their history.

Owen Coyle became the manager of Wigan Athletic replacing outgoing manager Roberto Martínez who left for Everton. Coyle was dismissed by the club on 2 December 2013, and was replaced by Uwe Rösler on 7 December.

Wigan finished fifth in the league, qualifying for the play-offs, where Queens Park Rangers eliminated them in the semi-finals. They also reached the semi-finals of the FA Cup, losing to eventual winners Arsenal. Although Wigan finished bottom of their Europa League group, they had a chance to advance as late as the last matchday away to Maribor.

== Transfers ==
=== In ===
| Pos | Player | From | Fee | Date | Source |
|---|---|---|---|---|---|
| MF | Chris McCann | Burnley | Free | 27 June 2013 | |
| DF | Stephen Crainey | Blackpool | Free | 28 June 2013 | |
| DF | Thomas Rogne | Celtic | Free | 1 July 2013 | |
| DF | James Perch | Newcastle United | £500,000 | 2 July 2013 | |
| GK | Scott Carson | Bursaspor | £750,000 | 4 July 2013 | |
| FW | Marc-Antoine Fortuné | West Bromwich Albion | Free | 5 July 2013 | |
| FW | Grant Holt | Norwich City | £1,500,000 | 8 July 2013 | |
| DF | Juan Carlos García | Olimpia | Free | 26 July 2013 | |
| DF | Leon Barnett | Norwich | £500,000 | 1 August 2013 | |
| MF | James McClean | Sunderland | £1,500,000 | 8 August 2013 | |
| MF | Nick Powell | Manchester United | Loan | 2 September 2013 | |
| DF | Ryan Shotton | Stoke City | Loan | 2 September 2013 | |
| MF | Marc Albrighton | Aston Villa | Loan | 30 October 2013 | |
| FW | Will Keane | Manchester United | Loan | 28 November 2013 | |
| DF | Tyias Browning | Everton | Loan | 10 January 2014 | |
| ST | Nicky Maynard | Cardiff City | Loan | 16 January 2014 | |
| MF | Josh McEachran | Chelsea | Loan | 23 January 2014 | |
| ST | Martyn Waghorn | Leicester City | Loan | 31 January 2014 | |
| DF | Markus Holgersson | New York Red Bulls | Free Transfer | 5 February 2014 | |
| MF | Ryan Tunnicliffe | Fulham | Loan | 25 February 2014 | |
| MF | Jack Collison | West Ham United | Loan | 18 March 2014 | |
| ST | Martyn Waghorn | Leicester City | Free | 4 April 2014 | |

=== Out ===
| Position | Player | Transferred To | Fee | Date | Source |
|---|---|---|---|---|---|
| MF | Peter Aylmer | N/A | Free transfer | 7 June 2013 | |
| MF | Jonathan Lynch | N/A | Free transfer | 7 June 2013 | |
| MF | Callum Morris | N/A | Free transfer | 7 June 2013 | |
| MF | Joshua Sumner | N/A | Free transfer | 7 June 2013 | |
| MF | Ryan Watson | Free transfer | 7 June 2013 | | |
| MF | Albert Crusat | Bnei Sakhnin | Free transfer | 7 June 2013 | |
| MF | David Jones | Burnley | Free transfer | 7 June 2013 | |
| DF | Adrián López | Montreal Impact | Free transfer | 7 June 2013 | |
| ST | Filip Oršula | MSV Duisburg | Free transfer | 7 June 2013 | |
| DF | Ronnie Stam | Standard Liège | Free transfer | 7 June 2013 | |
| DF | Román Golobart | 1. FC Köln | Free transfer | 14 June 2013 | |
| DF | Maynor Figueroa | Hull City | Free transfer | 17 June 2013 | |
| ST | Mauro Boselli | León | £1,000,000 | 28 June 2013 | |
| ST | Arouna Koné | Everton | £5,000,000 | 8 July 2013 | |
| DF | Antolín Alcaraz | Everton | Free transfer | 9 July 2013 | |
| ST | Franco Di Santo | Werder Bremen | Free transfer | 14 August 2013 | |
| GK | Mike Pollitt | Barnsley | Loan | 27 August 2013 | |
| MF | James McCarthy | Everton | £13,000,000 | 2 September 2013 | |
| DF | Jordan Mustoe | Bury | Loan | 1 October 2013 | |
| DF | Rob Kiernan | Southend | Loan | 12 October 2013 | |
| CMF | Fraser Fyvie | Yeovil Town | Loan | 17 October 2013 | |
| ST | Nouha Dicko | Rotherham United | Loan | 20 November 2013 | |
| DF | Adam Buxton | Burton Albion | Loan | 3 January 2014 | |
| ST | Nouha Dicko | Wolverhampton Wanderers | undisclosed | 13 January 2014 | |
| ST | Grant Holt | Aston Villa | Loan | 14 January 2014 | |
| DF | Jordan Mustoe | Wycombe Wanderers | Loan | 17 January 2014 | |

== Results ==
=== Preseason ===
| 13 July 2013 | Columbus Crew | 1–2 | Wigan Athletic | Columbus, Ohio |
| 7.30pm | Finley 74' | Report | McCarthy 46'; Fortuné 64' | Stadium: Columbus Crew Stadium; Attendance: 8,000 |

| 16 July 2013 | Dayton Dutch Lions | 1–6 | Wigan Athletic | Beavercreek, Ohio |
| 7.00pm | Swartzendruber 47' | Report | Fortuné 14'; McCarthy 38'; Holt 49', 86'; Dicko 62'; Bingham 68' | Stadium: Beavercreek Stadium; Attendance: 500 |

| 20 July 2013 | Pittsburgh Riverhounds | 1–4 | Wigan Athletic | Pittsburgh, Pennsylvania |
| 7.00pm | Angulo 10' | Report | Espinoza 15'; Boyce 28'; Holt 47'; Gómez 88' | Stadium: Highmark Stadium; Attendance: 4,000 (200 away) |

| 22 July 2013 | Wigan Athletic | 2–1 | Atromitos | Leigh |
| 7.30pm | Gómez 6' (pen.); Fortuné 35' | Report | Karamanos 77' | Stadium: Leigh Sports Village; Attendance: 616 |

| 24 July 2013 | Morecambe | 0–1 | Wigan Athletic | Morecambe |
| 7.45pm | | Report | Fortuné 76' | Stadium: Globe Arena; Attendance: 1,642 (385 away) |

| 27 July 2013 | Wigan Athletic | 0–1 | Dundee United | Wigan |
| 3.00pm | | Report | Çiftçi 52' | Stadium: DW Stadium; Attendance: 3,838 |

=== Football League Championship ===
| 3 August 2013 1 | Barnsley | 0–4 | Wigan Athletic | Barnsley |
| 15.00 BST | | Report | Watson 37'; Holt 55'; Barnett 80'; Maloney 88' | Stadium: Oakwell; Attendance: 13,096; Referee: G Eltrigham |

| 17 August 2013 2 | AFC Bournemouth | 1–0 | Wigan Athletic | Bournemouth |
| 15.00 BST | Grabban 43' | Report | | Stadium: Dean Court; Attendance: 9,097; Referee: G Scott |

| 20 August 2013 3 | Wigan Athletic | 2–2 | Doncaster Rovers | Wigan |
| 19.45 BST | Maloney 57'; Barnett 90' | Report | Robinson 25'; Brown 43' | Stadium: DW Stadium; Attendance: 14,304; Referee: C Boyeson |

| 25 August 2013 4 | Wigan Athletic | 2–2 | Middlesbrough | Wigan |
| 15.00 BST | Holt 17' (pen.); Gómez 85' | Report | Friend 45'; Leadbitter 75' | Stadium: DW Stadium; Attendance: 14,333; Referee: Coote |

| 31 August 2013 5 | Wigan Athletic | 2–1 | Nottingham Forest | Wigan |
| 15.00 BST | Maloney 14' (pen.); Gómez 35' | Report | Reid 8' | Stadium: DW Stadium; Attendance: 16,270; Referee: Pawson |

| 14 September 2013 6 | Leicester City | 2–0 | Wigan Athletic | Leicester |
| 15.00 BST | Moore 8'; Nugent 81' (pen.) | Report | | Stadium: King Power Stadium; Attendance: 21,810; Referee: Webb |

| 22 September 2013 7 | Wigan Athletic | 2–0 | Ipswich Town | Wigan |
| 15.00 BST | Shotton 12'; Powell 90' | Report | | Stadium: DW Stadium; Attendance: 13,747; Referee: Adcock |

| 28 September 2013 8 | Watford | 1–0 | Wigan Athletic | Watford |
| 15.00 BST | Battocchio 82' | Report | | Stadium: Vicarage Road; Attendance: 14,999; Referee: Madley |

| 6 October 2013 9 | Wigan Athletic | 2–1 | Blackburn Rovers | Wigan |
| 15.00 BST | Spurr 62' (o.g.); Boyce 90+2' | Report | Spurr 8' | Stadium: DW Stadium; Attendance: 16,996; Referee: Stuart Attwell |

| 19 October 2013 10 | Blackpool | 1–0 | Wigan Athletic | Blackpool |
| 15.00 BST | Ince 24' | Report | | Stadium: Bloomfield Road; Attendance: 15,721; Referee: Haywood |

| 27 October 2013 11 | Charlton Athletic | 0–0 | Wigan Athletic | Charlton |
| 15.00 GMT | | Report | | Stadium: The Valley; Attendance: 23,600; Referee: Steve Martin |

| 30 October 2013 12 | Wigan Athletic | 0–0 | Queens Park Rangers | Wigan |
| 19.45 GMT | | Report | | Stadium: DW Stadium; Attendance: 13,143; Referee: Michael Naylor |

| 2 November 2013 13 | Wigan Athletic | 2–1 | Huddersfield Town | Wigan |
| 19.45 GMT | Barnett 21'; Powell 49' | Report | Norwood 45' | Stadium: DW Stadium; Attendance: 16,112; Referee: Tony Harrington |

| 10 November 2013 14 | Yeovil Town | 0–1 | Wigan Athletic | Yeovil |
| 15.00 GMT | | Report | Fortuné 78' | Stadium: Huish Park; Attendance: 6,149; Referee: James Linington |

| 23 November 2013 15 | Wigan Athletic | 0–1 | Brighton & Hove Albion | Wigan |
| 15.00 GMT | | Report | Crofts 72' | Stadium: DW Stadium; Attendance: 14,057; Referee: Iain Williamson |

| 1 December 2013 16 | Wigan Athletic | 1–3 | Derby County | Wigan |
| 15.00 GMT | Powell 50' | Report | Bryson 3'; Dawkins 15'; Martin 29' (pen.) | Stadium: DW Stadium; Attendance: 15,097; Referee: David Coote |

| 4 December 2013 17 | Leeds United | 2–0 | Wigan Athletic | Leeds |
| 19:45 GMT | McCormack 15', 77' | Report | | Stadium: Elland Road; Attendance: 25,888; Referee: Graham Scott |

| 7 December 2013 18 | Millwall | 2–1 | Wigan Athletic | London |
| 15.00 GMT | Morison 3'; Easter 83' | Report | McArthur 84' | Stadium: The Den; Attendance: 9,519; Referee: Scott Duncan |

| 15 December 2013 19 | Wigan Athletic | 3–2 | Bolton Wanderers | Wigan |
| 15:00 GMT | Watson 11' (pen.); Powell 25'; McManaman 68' | Report | Danns 49'; Moritz 64' (pen.) | Stadium: DW Stadium; Attendance: 19,226; Referee: Kevin Friend |

| 18 December 2013 – | Sheffield Wednesday | A–A | Wigan Athletic | Sheffield |
| 19.45 GMT | | report | McClean 24'; Carson (yellow card) 53'; McArthur (yellow card) 55' | Stadium: Hillsborough Stadium; Attendance: 22,700 (approx.); Referee: Keith Stroud |
Note: Match abandoned after 59-minutes due to waterlogged pitch

| 21 December 2013 20 | Reading | 1–2 | Wigan Athletic | Reading |
| 19.45 GMT | Pogrebnyak 68' | report | McCann 10'; Powell 12' | Stadium: Madejski Stadium; Attendance: 18,336; Referee: Gary Sutton |

| 26 December 2013 21 | Wigan Athletic | 0–0 | Birmingham City | Wigan |
| 15.00 GMT | | Report | | Stadium: DW Stadium; Attendance: 14,996; Referee: Steve Martin |

| 29 December 2013 22 | Wigan Athletic | 0–0 | Burnley | Wigan |
| 15.00 GMT | | report | | Stadium: DW Stadium; Attendance: 17,712; Referee: Michael Jones |

| 1 January 2014 23 | Derby County | 0–1 | Wigan Athletic | Derby |
| 15.00 GMT | | report | Powell (yellow card) 35'; Perch (yellow card) 55'; Beausejour 69'; Barnett (yellow card) 78'; Boyce (yellow card) 89' | Stadium: iPro Stadium; Attendance: 26,740; Referee: David Webb |

| 11 January 2014 24 | Wigan Athletic | 3–0 | AFC Bournemouth | Wigan |
| 15.00 GMT | Fortuné 5'; McCann (yellow card) 40'; Ward 58' (o.g.); Gómez 90' | report | | Stadium: DW Stadium; Attendance: 12,709; Referee: Geoff Eltringham |

| 18 January 2014 25 | Doncaster Rovers | 3–0 | Wigan Athletic | Doncaster |
| 15:00 GMT | Brown 7', 69' (pen.); Tamaș (yellow card) 43'; Coppinger 52'; Keegan (yellow card) 78' | Report | McManaman (yellow card) 73' | Stadium: Keepmoat Stadium; Attendance: 8,331; Referee: Keith Hill |

| 28 January 2014 26 | Middlesbrough | 0–0 | Wigan Athletic | Middlesbrough |
| 19:45 GMT | Varga (yellow card) 48'; Ledesma (yellow card) 87' | Report | Perch (yellow card) 54'; Watson (yellow card) 58' | Stadium: Riverside Stadium; Attendance: 13,258; Referee: Michael Naylor |

| 1 February 2014 27 | Wigan Athletic | 2–1 | Charlton Athletic | Wigan |
| 15.00 GMT | Fortuné 88'; Gómez 90+1' | report | Sordell 3' | Stadium: DW Stadium; Attendance: 14,341; Referee: Michael Bull |

| 8 February 2014 28 | Huddersfield Town | 1–0 | Wigan Athletic | Huddersfield |
| 15.00 GMT | Lynch (yellow card) 67'; Clayton 85' | Report | | Stadium: John Smith's Stadium; Attendance: 15,576; Referee: Mark Brown |

| 11 February 2014 29 | Sheffield Wednesday | 0–3 | Wigan Athletic | Sheffield |
| 15:00 | Semedo (yellow card) 36'; Llera (yellow card) 45+2' | Report | Maynard 31', 38'; Waghorn (yellow card) 74'; Perch (yellow card) 88'; Fortuné 90+3' | Stadium: Hillsborough Stadium; Attendance: 25,279; Referee: David Webb |

| 18 February 2014 30 | Wigan Athletic | 2–0 | Barnsley | Wigan |
| 15.00 GMT | Maynard 35'; Waghorn 44'; Perch (yellow card) 62' | Report | Nyatanga (yellow card) 63'; O'Brein (yellow card) 77'; Frimpong (yellow card) 90+4' | Stadium: DW Stadium; Attendance: 14,121; Referee: Nigel Miller |

| 22 February 2014 31 | Brighton & Hove Albion | 1–2 | Wigan Athletic | Brighton |
| 19:45 GMT | Ulloa 78' | Report | McArthur 21'; McCann 50'; Beausejour (yellow card) 80' | Stadium: Falmer Stadium; Attendance: 27,490; Referee: Carl Boyeson |

| 2 March 2014 32 | Nottingham Forest | 1–4 | Wigan Athletic | Nottingham |
| 15:00 GMT | Paterson 54'; Fox (yellow card) 72' | Report | Waghorn 36'; Boyce 66'; McArthur 71'; Gómez 90'; Beausejour (yellow card) 52' | Stadium: City Ground; Attendance: 23,114; Referee: Stuart Attwell |

| 12 March 2014 33 | Wigan Athletic | 1–0 | Sheffield Wednesday | Wigan |
| 19:45 GMT | Al-Habsi (yellow card) 35'; Gómez (yellow card) 41', (goal) 88' (pen.) | Report | Best (penalty missed) 37'; Hélan (yellow card) 71' | Stadium: DW Stadium; Attendance: 15,039; Referee: Andy Haines |

| 15 March 2014 34 | Ipswich Town | 1–3 | Wigan Athletic | Ipswich |
| 15:00 GMT | Smith 19'; Hunt (yellow card) 56'; Green (yellow card) 67' | Report | McClean 22', 77', (yellow card) 38'; Barnett 42'; Ramis (yellow card) 57' | Stadium: Portman Road; Attendance: 16,047; Referee: David Coote |

| 18 March 2014 35 | Wigan Athletic | 3–3 | Yeovil Town | Wigan |
| 19:45 GMT | McManaman (yellow card) 15'; Gómez (penalty missed) 25'; McEachran (yellow card) 45+1'; Powell 56'; Gómez (yellow card) 65'; McArthur 86'; Webster 88' (o.g.) | Report | Ayling (yellow card) 7', (goal) 90+4'; Duffy (yellow card) 25'; Dawson (yellow card) 75'; Miller 82', 85' | Stadium: DW Stadium; Attendance: 12,970; Referee: Andy D'Urso |

| 22 March 2014 36 | Wigan Athletic | 2–1 | Watford | Wigan |
| 15:00 GMT | Beausejour 40'; Waghorn 57', (yellow card) 60' | Report | McGugan 36'; Tőzsér (yellow card) 58'; Diakité (yellow card) 83'; Ekstrand (yellow card) 89' | Stadium: DW Stadium; Attendance: 14,556; Referee: Scott Duncan |

| 25 March 2014 37 | Queens Park Rangers | 1–0 | Wigan Athletic | London |
| 19:45 GMT | Benayoun 16', (yellow card) 82' (yellow-red card) 90+2'; Morrison (yellow card) 87' | Report | McArthur (yellow card) 72' | Stadium: Loftus Road; Attendance: 14,649; Referee: Simon Hooper |

| 29 March 2014 38 | Bolton Wanderers | 1–1 | Wigan Athletic | Bolton |
| 15:00 GMT | Jutkiewicz 31'; Medo (yellow card) 41'; Baptiste (yellow card) 90+1'; Spearing (yellow card) 94' | Report | Waghorn (yellow card) 22'; Barnett (yellow card) 53'; Beausejour (yellow card) 85'; Powell 56'; Gómez (penalty missed) 93' | Stadium: Reebok Stadium; Attendance: 18,853; Referee: Darren Drysdale |

| 1 April 2014 39 | Wigan Athletic | 2–2 | Leicester City | Wigan |
| 19:45 BST | Ramis 37'; Gómez (yellow card) 41'; Kiernan 62' | Report | Hammond (yellow card) 37', (goal) 87'; King 41' | Stadium: DW Stadium; Attendance: 15,025; Referee: Jon Moss |

| 5 April 2014 40 | Wigan Athletic | 1–0 | Leeds United | Wigan |
| 12:15 BST | Perch (yellow card) 2'; Gómez (yellow card) 22'; Waghorn 33'; Ramis (yellow card) 62' | Report | Wootton (yellow card) 13'; Brown (yellow card) 42' | Stadium: DW Stadium; Attendance: 16,443; Referee: Neil Swarbrick |

| 8 April 2014 41 | Wigan Athletic | 0–1 | Millwall | Wigan |
| 19:45 BST | | Report | Edwards 22'; Upson (yellow card) 45'; Maierhofer (yellow card) 51'; Forde (yellow card) 90' | Stadium: DW Stadium; Attendance: 14,124; Referee: Keith Hill |

| 18 April 2014 42 | Wigan Athletic | 3–0 | Reading | Wigan |
| 15:00 BST | McManaman (yellow card) 27', (goal) 51'; Gómez 30'; Waghorn 42' | Report | Williams (yellow card) 22'; Akpan (yellow card) 59' | Stadium: DW Stadium; Attendance: 14,609; Referee: Craig Pawson |

| 21 April 2014 43 | Burnley | 2–0 | Wigan Athletic | Burnley |
| 15:00 BST | Barnes 22', (yellow card) 35'; Kightly 42'; Mee (yellow card) 78' | Report | Fortuné (yellow card) 40'; Perch (yellow card) 45+1'; Boyce (yellow card) 61'; Collison (yellow card) 66' | Stadium: Turf Moor; Attendance: 19,125; Referee: Keith Stroud |

| 26 April 2014 44 | Wigan Athletic | 0–2 | Blackpool | Wigan |
| 15:00 BST | | Report | Bishop (yellow card) 55'; Keogh 60'; Dobbie 70' | Stadium: DW Stadium; Attendance: 19,137; Referee: Andy D'Urso |

| 29 April 2014 45 | Birmingham City | 0–1 | Wigan Athletic | Birmingham |
| 19:45 BST | Adeyemi (yellow card) 80'; Žigić (yellow card) 90+2' | Report | McManaman 3' | Stadium: St Andrew's; Attendance: 20,427; Referee: Andy Woolmer |

| 3 May 2014 46 | Blackburn Rovers | 4–3 | Wigan Athletic | Blackburn |
| 12:15 BST | Cairney 13'; Gestede 19', 35', (yellow card) 68'; Hanley (yellow card) 45+1'; Rhodes 84'; Kilgallon (yellow card) 86' | Report | Ramis 17'; McClean (yellow card) 45+2', (goal) 59'; Crainey (yellow card) 79'; Maynard 87' | Stadium: Ewood Park; Attendance: 16,996; Referee: Roger East |

==== Result and position by match ====
| Round | 1 | 2 | 3 | 4 | 5 | 6 | 7 | 8 | 9 | 10 | 11 | 12 | 13 | 14 | 15 | 16 | 17 | 18 | 19 | 20 | 21 | 22 | 23 | 24 | 25 | 26 | 27 | 28 | 29 | 30 | 31 | 32 | 33 | 34 | 35 | 36 | 37 | 38 | 39 | 40 | 41 | 42 | 43 | 44 | 45 | 46 |
|---|---|---|---|---|---|---|---|---|---|---|---|---|---|---|---|---|---|---|---|---|---|---|---|---|---|---|---|---|---|---|---|---|---|---|---|---|---|---|---|---|---|---|---|---|---|---|
| Ground | A | A | H | H | H | A | H | A | H | A | A | H | H | A | H | H | A | A | H | A | H | H | A | H | A | A | H | A | A | H | A | A | H | A | H | H | A | A | H | H | H | H | A | H | A | A |
| Result | W | L | D | D | W | L | W | L | W | L | D | D | W | W | L | L | L | L | W | W | D | D | W | W | L | D | W | L | W | W | W | W | W | W | D | W | L | D | D | W | L | W | L | L | W | L |
| Position | 1 | 13 | 10 | 12 | 8 | 12 | 11 | 13 | 12 | 12 | 14 | 14 | 10 | 10 | 11 | 14 | 14 | 14 | 14 | 12 | 13 | 14 | 11 | 10 | 11 | 11 | 10 | 11 | 9 | 7 | 7 | 6 | 7 | 5 | 5 | 5 | 5 | 5 | 5 | 5 | 5 | 5 | 5 | 5 | 5 | 5 |

Updated to match(es) played on 3 May 2014. Source: nPower Championship
A = Away; H = Home; W = Win; D = Draw; L = Loss

=== Football League Championship play-offs ===
| 9 May 2014 Semi-Final 1st Leg | Wigan Athletic | 0–0 | Queens Park Rangers | Wigan |
| 19.45 BST | McArthur (yellow card) 24'; McManaman (yellow card) 24'; Caldwell (yellow card) 34' | Report | Dunne (yellow card) 23' | Stadium: DW Stadium; Attendance: 14,560; Referee: Mike Jones |

| 12 May 2014 Semi-Final 2nd Leg | Queens Park Rangers | 2–1 (a.e.t.) (2–1 agg.) | Wigan Athletic | London |
| 19:45 BST | Barton (yellow card) 58'; O'Neil (yellow card) 61'; Kranjčar (yellow card) 64'; Austin 73' (pen.), 96' | Report | Perch 9'; McClean (yellow card) 23' | Stadium: Loftus Road; Attendance: 17,061; Referee: Mark Clattenburg |

=== UEFA Europa League ===
==== Group stage ====
| Pos | Team | Pld | W | D | L | GF | GA | GD | Pts | Qualification |
|---|---|---|---|---|---|---|---|---|---|---|
| 1 | (Russia) Rubin Kazan | 6 | 4 | 2 | 0 | 14 | 4 | +10 | 14 | Advance to knockout phase |
| 2 | (Slovenia) Maribor | 6 | 2 | 1 | 3 | 9 | 12 | −3 | 7 (Note: Tied on head-to-head points (3). Head-to-head goal difference: Maribor +1, Zulte Waregem −1.) | Advance to knockout phase |
| 3 | (Belgium) Zulte Waregem | 6 | 2 | 1 | 3 | 4 | 10 | −6 | 7 | |
| 4 | (England) Wigan Athletic | 6 | 1 | 2 | 3 | 6 | 7 | −1 | 5 | |

Source: Soccerway
Notes:

| 19 September 2013 Matchday 1 | Zulte Waregem | 0–0 | Wigan Athletic | Bruges |
| 18.00 CET | | Report | | Stadium: Jan Breydel Stadium; Attendance: 7,041; Referee: Marcin Borski (Poland) |

| 3 October 2013 Matchday 2 | Wigan Athletic | 3–1 | Maribor | Wigan |
| 20.05 BST | Powell 22', 90+1'; Watson 34' | Report | Tavares 59' | Stadium: DW Stadium; Attendance: 12,753; Referee: Aleksandar Stavrev (Macedonia) |

| 24 October 2013 Matchday 3 | Wigan Athletic | 1–1 | Rubin Kazan | Wigan |
| 20.05 BST | Powell 39' | report | Prudnikov 15' | Stadium: DW Stadium; Attendance: 14,723; Referee: Florian Meyer (Germany) |

| 7 November 2013 Matchday 4 | Rubin Kazan | 1–0 | Wigan Athletic | Kazan |
| 18.00 CET | Kuzmin 22' | Report | | Stadium: Tsentralnyi Stadion; Attendance: 5,579; Referee: Hüseyin Göçek (Turkey) |

| 28 November 2013 Matchday 5 | Wigan Athletic | 1–2 | Zulte Waregem | Wigan |
| 20.05 GMT | Barnett 7' | Report | Hazard 37'; Malanda 88' | Stadium: DW Stadium; Attendance: 15,543; Referee: Ruddy Buquet (France) |

| 12 December 2013 Matchday 6 | Maribor | 2–1 | Wigan Athletic | Maribor |
| 18.00 CET | Mezga 43' (pen.); Filipović 59' | Report | Gómez 41' (pen.) | Stadium: Ljudski vrt Attendance: 9,035; Referee: Szymon Marciniak (Poland) |

=== FA Cup ===
| 4 January 2014 Third Round | Wigan Athletic | 3–3 | Milton Keynes Dons | Wigan |
| 15.00 GMT | Espinoza 18'; Gómez 27'; McManaman 65' | Report | Reeves 45', 45+2'; Bamford 84' | Stadium: DW Stadium; Attendance: 6,960; Referee: Roger East |

| 14 January 2014 Replay | Milton Keynes Dons | 1–3 (a.e.t.) | Wigan Athletic | Denbigh, Milton Keynes |
| 19.45 GMT | Chadwick 10' | Report | Powell 79', 92'; Fortuné 105' | Stadium: Stadium mk Attendance: 8,316; Referee: James Adcock |

| 25 January 2014 Fourth Round | Wigan Athletic | 2–1 | Crystal Palace | Wigan |
| 15.00 GMT | Watson 36'; McClean 78' | Report | Wilbraham 69' | Stadium: DW Stadium; Attendance: 9,542; Referee: Mike Jones |

| 15 February 2014 Fifth Round | Cardiff City | 1–2 | Wigan Athletic | Cardiff |
| 15.00 GMT | Campbell 27' | Report | McCann 18'; Watson 40' | Stadium: Cardiff City Stadium; Attendance: 17,123; Referee: Martin Atkinson |

| 9 March 2014 Sixth Round | Manchester City | 1–2 | Wigan Athletic | Manchester |
| 16.05 GMT | Nasri 68' | Report | Gómez 27' (pen.); Perch 47' | Stadium: City of Manchester Stadium; Attendance: 46,824; Referee: Anthony Taylor |

| 12 April 2014 Semi–Final | Wigan Athletic | 1–1 (2–4 p) | Arsenal | London |
| 17:07 BST | Gómez 63' (pen.), (yellow card) 79'; McArthur (yellow card) 90+3'; Collison (yellow card) 90+4'; Beausejour (yellow card) 120+1' | Report | Mertesacker 82' | Stadium: Wembley Stadium; Attendance: 82,815; Referee: Michael Oliver |
| | Penalties |
| | Caldwell (penalty missed); Collison (penalty missed); Beausejour (penalty scored); McArthur (penalty scored) | | (penalty scored) Arteta; (penalty scored) Källström; (penalty scored) Giroud; (penalty scored) Cazorla |

=== League Cup ===
| 24 September 2013 Third round | Manchester City | 5–0 | Wigan Athletic | Manchester |
| 19:45 BST | Džeko 33'; Jovetić 60', 83'; Touré 76'; Navas 86' | Report | | Stadium: City of Manchester Stadium; Attendance: 25,519; Referee: Kevin Friend |

=== FA Community Shield ===
| 11 August 2013 Final | Wigan Athletic | 0–2 | Manchester United | London |
| 14:00 BST | McArthur (yellow card) 50'; Espinoza (yellow card) 88' | Report | Van Persie 6', 59'; Cleverley (yellow card) 90+1' | Stadium: Wembley Stadium; Attendance: 80,235; Referee: Mark Clattenburg |

== League table ==
| Pos | Team | Pld | W | D | L | GF | GA | GD | Pts | Promotion, qualification or relegation |
|---|---|---|---|---|---|---|---|---|---|---|
| 3 | Derby County | 46 | 25 | 10 | 11 | 84 | 52 | +32 | 85 | Qualification for Championship play-offs |
| 4 | Queens Park Rangers (O, P) | 46 | 23 | 11 | 12 | 60 | 44 | +16 | 80 | Qualification for Championship play-offs |
| 5 | Wigan Athletic | 46 | 21 | 10 | 15 | 61 | 48 | +13 | 73 | Qualification for Championship play-offs |
| 6 | Brighton & Hove Albion | 46 | 19 | 15 | 12 | 55 | 40 | +15 | 72 | Qualification for Championship play-offs |
| 7 | Reading | 46 | 19 | 14 | 13 | 70 | 56 | +14 | 71 | |

Source: BBC Sport
Rules for classification: 1) points; 2) goal difference; 3) number of goals scored
(O) Play-off winners; (P) Promoted

== Squad statistics ==
Statistics accurate as of 12 May 2014

| No. | Pos. | Name | League | | FA Cup | | League Cup | | Europe | | Community Shield | | League play-off | | Total | | Discipline | |
| No. | Pos. | Name | Apps | Goals | Apps | Goals | Apps | Goals | Apps | Goals | Apps | Goals | Apps | Goals | Apps | Goals | Yellow card | Red card |
Goalkeepers
| 1 | GK | Scott Carson | 16 | 0 | 2 | 0 | 0 | 0 | 4 | 0 | 1 | 0 | 2 | 0 | 25 | 0 | 1 | 0 |
| 12 | GK | Mike Pollitt | 0 | 0 | 0 | 0 | 0 | 0 | 0 | 0 | 0 | 0 | 0 | 0 | 0 | 0 | 0 | 0 |
| 13 | GK | Lee Nicholls | 6 | 0 | 0 | 0 | 1 | 0 | 2 | 0 | 0 | 0 | 0 | 0 | 9 | 0 | 0 | 0 |
| 26 | GK | Ali Al-Habsi | 24 | 0 | 4 | 0 | 0 | 0 | 0 | 0 | 0 | 0 | 0 | 0 | 28 | 0 | 1 | 0 |
Defenders
| 2 | DF | Markus Holgersson | 0 (1) | 0 | 0 | 0 | 0 | 0 | 0 | 0 | 0 | 0 | 0 | 0 | 0 (1) | 0 | 0 | 0 |
| 3 | DF | Stephen Crainey | 14 (6) | 0 | 3 (1) | 0 | 1 | 0 | 4 | 0 | 1 | 0 | 0 | 0 | 24 (7) | 0 | 4 | 0 |
| 5 | DF | Gary Caldwell | 2 | 0 | 0 (1) | 0 | 0 | 0 | 0 | 0 | 0 | 0 | 2 | 0 | 4 (1) | 0 | 1 | 0 |
| 6 | DF | Thomas Rogne | 10 (2) | 0 | 0 | 0 | 1 | 0 | 3 | 0 | 0 | 0 | 0 | 0 | 14 (2) | 0 | 1 | 0 |
| 17 | DF | Emmerson Boyce | 39 (3) | 2 | 5 (1) | 0 | 1 | 0 | 4 (1) | 0 | 1 | 0 | 2 | 0 | 50 (5) | 2 | 4 | 0 |
| 21 | DF | Iván Ramis | 15 | 2 | 3 | 0 | 0 | 0 | 0 | 0 | 0 | 0 | 0 | 0 | 18 | 2 | 1 | 0 |
| 23 | DF | Juan Carlos García | 0 | 0 | 0 | 0 | 1 | 0 | 0 | 0 | 0 | 0 | 0 | 0 | 1 | 0 | 0 | 0 |
| 24 | DF | James Perch | 38 (2) | 0 | 6 | 1 | 0 | 0 | 4 | 0 | 1 | 0 | 2 | 1 | 51 (2) | 2 | 9 | 0 |
| 25 | DF | Leon Barnett | 39 (2) | 4 | 3 (1) | 0 | 1 | 0 | 4 | 1 | 1 | 0 | 0 (1) | 0 | 48 (4) | 5 | 6 | 0 |
| 27 | DF | Jordan Mustoe | 0 | 0 | 0 | 0 | 0 | 0 | 0 | 0 | 0 | 0 | 0 | 0 | 0 | 0 | 0 | 0 |
| 30 | DF | Rob Kiernan | 7 (5) | 1 | 0 | 0 | 0 | 0 | 0 | 0 | 0 | 0 | 2 | 0 | 9 (5) | 1 | 0 | 0 |
Midfielders
| 4 | CM | Josh McEachran | 5 (3) | 0 | 2 (1) | 0 | 0 | 0 | 0 | 0 | 0 | 0 | 0 | 0 | 7 (4) | 0 | 2 | 0 |
| 7 | CM | Chris McCann | 22 (5) | 2 | 3 (2) | 1 | 1 | 0 | 4 (1) | 0 | 0 (1) | 0 | 0 | 0 | 30 (9) | 3 | 5 | 1 |
| 8 | CM | Ben Watson | 25 | 2 | 3 | 2 | 0 | 0 | 2 (2) | 1 | 1 | 0 | 0 | 0 | 31 (2) | 5 | 8 | 0 |
| 10 | CM | Shaun Maloney | 9 (1) | 3 | 0 | 0 | 0 | 0 | 0 | 0 | 1 | 0 | 2 | 0 | 12 (1) | 3 | 0 | 0 |
| 11 | LM | James McClean | 23 (14) | 3 | 3 (2) | 1 | 0 | 0 | 3 (2) | 0 | 1 | 0 | 1 | 0 | 31 (18) | 4 | 9 | 0 |
| 14 | CM | Jordi Gómez | 22 (9) | 7 | 4 (1) | 3 | 1 | 0 | 5 (1) | 1 | 0 (1) | 0 | 2 | 0 | 31 (12) | 11 | 6 | 0 |
| 16 | CM | James McArthur | 37 (4) | 4 | 5 | 0 | 0 | 0 | 5 | 0 | 1 | 0 | 2 | 0 | 50 (4) | 4 | 9 | 0 |
| 18 | CM | Roger Espinoza | 7 (11) | 0 | 4 (1) | 1 | 1 | 0 | 2 (1) | 0 | 0 (1) | 0 | 0 (1) | 0 | 14 (15) | 1 | 3 | 0 |
| 19 | CM | Nick Powell | 23 (7) | 7 | 0 (3) | 2 | 0 (1) | 0 | 5 (1) | 3 | 0 | 0 | 0 | 0 | 26 (12) | 12 | 4 | 0 |
| 20 | CM | Fraser Fyvie | 0 | 0 | 1 | 0 | 1 | 0 | 0 | 0 | 0 | 0 | 0 | 0 | 2 | 0 | 2 | 0 |
| 22 | CM | Jean Beausejour | 30 (3) | 2 | 4 | 0 | 1 | 0 | 3 | 0 | 0 | 0 | 2 | 0 | 40 (3) | 2 | 10 | 0 |
| 28 | CM | Daniel Redmond | 0 | 0 | 0 | 0 | 0 (1) | 0 | 0 | 0 | 0 | 0 | 0 | 0 | 0 (1) | 0 | 0 | 0 |
| 31 | MF | Ryan Tunnicliffe | 3 (2) | 0 | 0 | 0 | 0 | 0 | 0 | 0 | 0 | 0 | 0 | 0 | 3 (2) | 0 | 0 | 0 |
| 34 | MF | Jack Collison | 5 (4) | 0 | 0 (1) | 0 | 0 | 0 | 0 | 0 | 0 | 0 | 0 | 0 | 5 (5) | 0 | 3 | 0 |
Attackers
| 15 | ST | Callum McManaman | 17 (14) | 3 | 5 | 1 | 0 | 0 | 5 (1) | 0 | 0 (1) | 0 | 2 | 0 | 28 (16) | 4 | 4 | 1 |
| 29 | ST | Nicky Maynard | 11 (5) | 4 | 1 | 0 | 0 | 0 | 0 | 0 | 0 | 0 | 0 (1) | 0 | 12 (6) | 4 | 0 | 0 |
| 32 | ST | Marc-Antoine Fortuné | 16 (20) | 4 | 4 (2) | 1 | 0 | 0 | 0 (5) | 0 | 0 (1) | 0 | 1 | 0 | 21 (27) | 6 | 0 | 0 |
| 33 | ST | Martyn Waghorn | 15 | 5 | 0 | 0 | 0 | 0 | 0 | 0 | 0 | 0 | 0 (2) | 0 | 15 (2) | 5 | 3 | 0 |
Players that played for Wigan this season that have left the club:
| 4 | CM | James McCarthy | 5 | 0 | 0 | 0 | 0 | 0 | 0 | 0 | 1 | 0 | - | - | 6 | 0 | 1 | 0 |
| 33 | RM | Marc Albrighton | 2 (2) | 0 | 0 | 0 | 0 | 0 | 1 | 0 | 0 | 0 | - | - | 3 (2) | 0 | 1 | 0 |
| 4 | DF | Ryan Shotton | 7 (3) | 1 | 0 | 0 | 0 (1) | 0 | 4 | 0 | 0 | 0 | - | - | 11 (3) | 0 | 2 | 0 |
| 31 | ST | Will Keane | 2 (2) | 0 | 0 | 0 | 0 | 0 | 0 | 0 | 0 | 0 | - | - | 2 (2) | 0 | 0 | 0 |
| 9 | ST | Grant Holt | 9 (7) | 2 | 1 | 0 | 0 | 0 | 2 (1) | 0 | 1 | 0 | 0 | 0 | 13 (8) | 2 | 0 | 0 |
| 29 | ST | Nouha Dicko | 0 | 0 | 0 (1) | 0 | 1 | 0 | 0 (2) | 0 | 0 (1) | 0 | - | - | 1 (4) | 0 | 0 | 0 |
| 31 | DF | Tyias Browning | 1 (1) | 0 | 0 | 0 | 0 | 0 | 0 | 0 | 0 | 0 | - | - | 1 (1) | 0 | 0 | 0 |

=== Top scorers ===
Statistics accurate as of 12 May 2014

| Position | Number | Name | Championship | FA Cup | League Cup | Europe | League play-off | Total |
|---|---|---|---|---|---|---|---|---|
| MF | 19 | Nick Powell | 7 | 2 | 0 | 3 | 0 | 12 |
| MF | 14 | Jordi Gómez | 7 | 3 | 0 | 1 | 0 | 11 |
| ST | 32 | Marc-Antoine Fortuné | 4 | 1 | 0 | 0 | 0 | 5 |
| MF | 8 | Ben Watson | 2 | 2 | 0 | 1 | 0 | 5 |
| DF | 25 | Leon Barnett | 4 | 0 | 0 | 1 | 0 | 5 |
| FW | 33 | Martyn Waghorn | 5 | 0 | 0 | 0 | 0 | 5 |
| MF | 16 | James McArthur | 4 | 0 | 0 | 0 | 0 | 4 |
| ST | 15 | Callum McManaman | 3 | 1 | 0 | 0 | 0 | 4 |
| MF | 11 | James McClean | 3 | 1 | 0 | 0 | 0 | 4 |
| ST | 29 | Nicky Maynard | 4 | 0 | 0 | 0 | 0 | 4 |
| MF | 10 | Shaun Maloney | 3 | 0 | 0 | 0 | 0 | 3 |
| MF | 7 | Chris McCann | 2 | 1 | 0 | 0 | 0 | 3 |
| DF | 17 | Emerson Boyce | 2 | 0 | 0 | 0 | 0 | 2 |
| ST | 9 | Grant Holt | 2 | 0 | 0 | 0 | 0 | 2 |
| DF | 22 | Jean Beausejour | 2 | 0 | 0 | 0 | 0 | 2 |
| DF | 21 | Iván Ramis | 2 | 0 | 0 | 0 | 0 | 2 |
| DF | 24 | James Perch | 0 | 1 | 0 | 0 | 1 | 2 |
| MF | 4 | Ryan Shotton | 1 | 0 | 0 | 0 | 0 | 1 |
| MF | 18 | Roger Espinoza | 0 | 1 | 0 | 0 | 0 | 1 |
| DF | 30 | Rob Kiernan | 1 | 0 | 0 | 0 | 0 | 1 |
| Own goals | | | 3 | 0 | 0 | 0 | 0 | 3 |
| Totals | | | 61 | 10 | 0 | 6 | 1 | 78 |
