= Martin King (businessman) =

Martin King is the founder and managing director of the Luton based corporate entertainment booking agency, Eminence but is better known for the scandals that occurred during his tenure as director of Luton Town. King was a director of Luton Town from July 2005 until March 2007, when he resigned following the sacking of Mike Newell. King called Newell's sacking undemocratic, and suggested that only two board members were actually present at the sacking although that's not believed to be the sole reason behind his departure.

King has since revealed that £3,700,000 is currently unaccounted for at the club, and that Newell was sacked for a letter he sent to the board of directors questioning certain the ongoings at the club.
