= Besian Idrizaj =

Austrian footballer (1987–2010)

Personal information
- Full name: Besian Idrizaj
- Date of birth: 12 October 1987
- Place of birth: Baden bei Wien, Austria
- Date of death: 15 May 2010 (aged 22)
- Place of death: Linz, Austria
- Height: 1.89 m (6 ft 2 in)
- Position: Striker

Youth career
- 1998–2003: Admira Linz

Senior career*
Years	Team	Apps	(Gls)
2003–2004	Admira Linz	0	(0)
2003–2005	LASK Linz	35	(4)
2005–2008	Liverpool	0	(0)
2007	→ Luton Town (loan)	7	(1)
2007–2008	→ Crystal Palace (loan)	7	(0)
2008	→ Wacker Innsbruck (loan)	2	(0)
2009	FC Eilenburg	5	(0)
2009–2010	Swansea City	3	(0)
Total		59	(5)

International career
2007–2009	Austria U21	12	(3)
- * Club domestic league appearances and goals

Besian Idrizaj (12 October 1987 – 15 May 2010) was an Austrian professional footballer. He played in the Football League for Crystal Palace and Luton Town both whilst on loan from Liverpool for whom he did not make a League appearance. He also played for LASK Linz, Wacker Innsbruck and FC Eilenburg before returning in the English football league with Swansea City. He died of a heart attack on 15 May 2010 at the age of 22. He was of Albanian descent.

== Career ==
=== Beginnings ===
Idrizaj started his career with Admira Linz and LASK Linz. He was Austria's young player of the year in the 2004–05 season.

=== Liverpool ===
He signed for Liverpool from LASK in the summer of 2005 on a two-year contract, following a trial spell.

At the time, he declared "I have always been a Liverpool fan and it is a dream come true to play for them. If you get a chance to go to Liverpool on trial then you have to take it. You cannot ignore a trial with the reigning Champions League winners. I would even have swum across the channel just to take part."

His 2005–06 season was interrupted by injuries. However, Idrizaj was expected to be a regular member of Gary Ablett and Hughie McAuley's reserve squad for the 2006–07 season. He made his debut for the first team in a pre-season friendly against Wrexham on 15 July 2006, playing for the first 45 minutes upfront as a striker, alongside fellow debutant Craig Bellamy. After going on loan to Luton Town in 2007 he returned to Liverpool for the close season. On 7 July 2007, Idrizaj scored a hat trick in a friendly for the Reds against Wrexham in a period of 26 minutes. All three goals were set up by Jermaine Pennant.

=== Luton Town ===
On 16 March 2007, Idrizaj went on loan to Championship team Luton Town, until the end of the 2006–07 season. He made his English league debut with them the day after, but was substituted after 49 minutes. He went on to play six more times for the club, scoring one goal against Southend United.

=== Crystal Palace ===
On 30 August 2007 he signed for Crystal Palace on a 12-month loan deal.

Idrizaj made his debut for Crystal Palace against Charlton Athletic on 1 September 2007 in the South London derby as a 72nd-minute replacement for Clinton Morrison. However, Idrizaj failed to establish himself at Crystal Palace and in January 2008 Manager Neil Warnock demanded that Liverpool take him back during the January transfer window as he would see no further action during his remaining time on loan with Crystal Palace. On 31 January 2008, Idrizaj of his own accord agreed to a loan move to Oldham Athletic for the remainder of the 2007–08 season after cancelling the remainder of the loan deal at Palace. However, after interference from his agent Idrizaj backtracked on the deal and decided not to join The Latics.

=== Return to Austria ===
On 31 January 2008 he signed for Austrian club Wacker Innsbruck on loan, from Liverpool, until the end of the 2007–08 football season, when his contract at Liverpool was terminated. While at Innsbruck, he collapsed on the pitch during a game against Sturm Graz. However, after undergoing medical tests, he was cleared to resume his football career after the tests indicated the collapse was a result of a virus rather than a heart problem.

=== FC Eilenburg ===
Idrizaj played five games in the German NOFV-Oberliga Süd for FC Eilenburg and received a red card in his second game.

=== Swansea City ===
Swansea City took Idrizaj on trial on 18 August 2009 and he signed for the club on 22 August 2009. He was hailed by Swansea manager Paulo Sousa: "he's not quite a striker but he is an attacking player, I know a lot about him and he is the sort of player that could fit into our squad." He signed after impressing Sousa in training. He was given permission to train on field during the Reading and Coventry City games. It was reported he was offered the contract during the Coventry City game on 22 August. He accepted the contract at half time. He played three games for the club that season as they narrowly missed out on the Football League Championship play-offs and the chance of Premier League football.

== Death ==
Idrizaj died on 15 May 2010 at the age of 22, barely two weeks after the end of the Championship campaign. Reports suggest he suffered a heart attack in his sleep. It was also reported that Idrizaj had previously collapsed on two separate occasions while playing football: once during a trial with his former club LASK Linz in November 2008 and also during a match for Wacker Innsbruck in February 2008.

== Tribute ==
As a mark of respect following Swansea's Championship play-off final win over Reading on 30 May 2011, the Swansea players all wore T-shirts with Idrizaj's photo and name on them. Swansea also decided to retire his number 40 shirt.

== Statistics ==
Club performance
Club	Season	League		National Cup		League Cup		Europe		Others		Total	
Club	Season	App	Goals	App	Goals	App	Goals	App	Goals	App	Goals	App	Goals
Admira Linz	2003–04	0	0	0	0	—		0	0	0	0	0	0
LASK Linz	2003–04	1	0	0	0	—		0	0	0	0	1	0
LASK Linz	2004–05	27	3	1?	1?	—		0	0	0	0	28	4
LASK Linz	2005–06	7	0	0	0	—		0	0	0	0	7	0
Liverpool	2005–06	0	0	0	0	0	0	0	0	0	0	0	0
Liverpool	2006–07	0	0	0	0	0	0	0	0	0	0	0	0
Liverpool	2007–08	0	0	0	0	0	0	0	0	0	0	0	0
Liverpool	Total	0	0	0	0	0	0	0	0	0	0	0	0
Luton Town (loan)	2006–07	7	1	0	0	0	0	0	0	0	0	7	1
Crystal Palace (loan)	2007–08	7	0	0	0	0	0	0	0	0	0	7	0
FC Wacker Innsbruck (loan)	2007–08	2	0	0	0	0	0	0	0	0	0	2	0
FC Eilenburg	2008–09	5	0	0	0	0	0	0	0	0	0	5	0
Swansea City	2009–10	3	0	0	0	1	0	0	0	0	0	4	0
Total		59	4	1?	1?	0	0	0	0	0	0	60	5

== Honours ==
Swansea City

- Retired number #40: posthumous honour
