= Martyn Waghorn =

English footballer (born 1990)

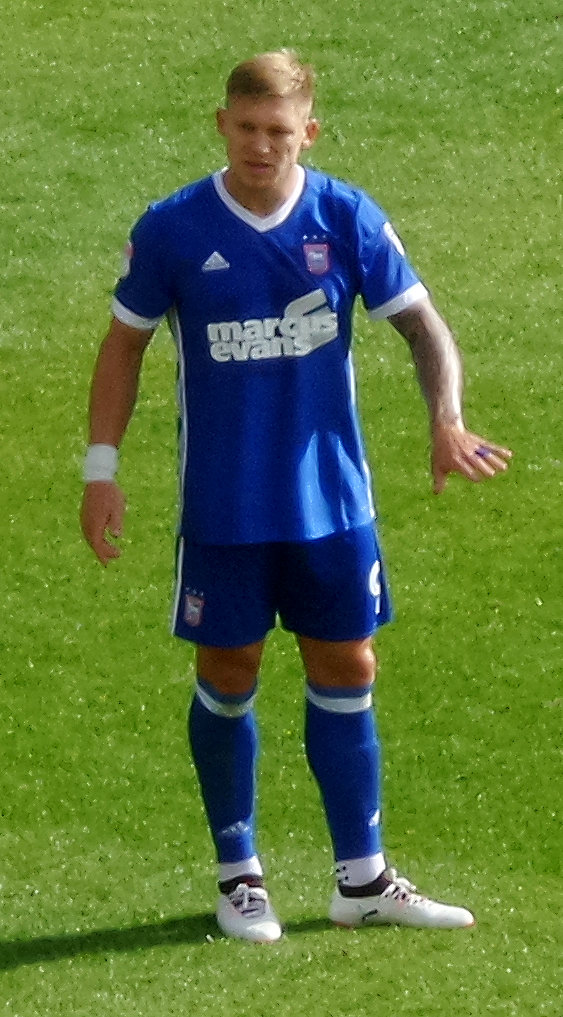
- Waghorn on his Ipswich Town league debut in 2017

Personal information
- Full name: Martyn Thomas Waghorn
- Date of birth: 23 January 1990 (age 36)
- Place of birth: South Shields, England
- Height: 5 ft 10 in (1.78 m)
- Position: Forward

Team information
- Current team: Anstey Nomads

Youth career
- 1998–2007: Sunderland

Senior career*
Years	Team	Apps	(Gls)
2007–2010	Sunderland	6	(0)
2008–2009	→ Charlton Athletic (loan)	7	(1)
2009–2010	→ Leicester City (loan)	43	(12)
2010–2014	Leicester City	60	(8)
2011	→ Hull City (loan)	5	(1)
2013	→ Millwall (loan)	14	(3)
2014	→ Wigan Athletic (loan)	9	(3)
2014–2015	Wigan Athletic	29	(5)
2015–2017	Rangers	57	(28)
2017–2018	Ipswich Town	44	(16)
2018–2021	Derby County	111	(26)
2021–2023	Coventry City	38	(2)
2023	→ Huddersfield Town (loan)	13	(1)
2023–2024	Derby County	24	(7)
2024	Northampton Town	6	(0)
2025–	Anstey Nomads	2	(2)

International career
2009	England U19	2	(0)
2011–2012	England U21	5	(2)
- * Club domestic league appearances and goals as of 02:45, 15 February 2026 (UTC) (UTC)

Martyn Thomas Waghorn (born 23 January 1990) is an English former professional footballer who plays as a forward for Southern League Premier Division Central club Anstey Nomads. He is a former England under-21 international.

Waghorn had been with Sunderland since the age of eight and made his first-team debut for the club in December 2007, against Manchester United, at the age of 17. He had loan spells with Charlton Athletic and Leicester City, before joining Leicester City on a permanent deal in August 2010. He played sparingly for Leicester City, spending time out on loan at Hull City, Millwall and Wigan Athletic, before signing permanently for the latter in April 2014. In July 2015, he left England for the first time, joining Scottish club Rangers. He returned to English football in August 2017, when he joined Ipswich Town and later Derby County before signing for Coventry City in July 2021, in January 2023 Waghorn joined Huddersfield Town on loan, before re-joining Derby County in August 2023, before being released by the club in June 2024. After a spell as a free agent, he signed Northampton Town in November 2024 on short-term deal before leaving in December 2024, in February 2025 Waghorn retired from professional football.

== Club career ==
=== Sunderland ===
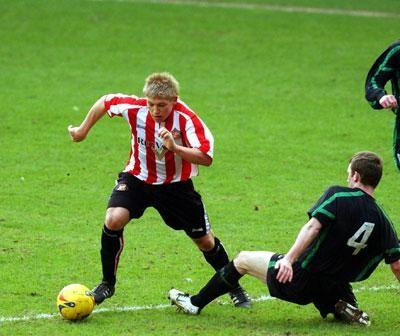
Waghorn playing for Sunderland reserves

Waghorn was born in South Shields, Tyne and Wear. From the age of eight Waghorn played for his local team Sunderland and he progressed through the youth system at the Academy of Light to reach the under-18 team. Waghorn scored the first hat-trick of his career on 12 December 2007 in a 6–1 win against Norwich City in the FA Youth Cup third round. He scored twice in a 4–2 win against local rivals Newcastle United a few days later at the Academy of Light, both of the goals being penalties.

Waghorn made his first team debut against Manchester United at the Stadium of Light on 26 December 2007; the match finished 4–0 to Manchester United. The player, usually a striker, had to play in left midfield, and after the match manager Roy Keane heaped praise on the young player, predicting that he would have a "long and successful career". Waghorn signed a new two-and-a-half-year contract with Sunderland in February 2008, which Keane described as good for both Sunderland and the player. His only appearance for the club in the 2008–09 season was against Chelsea at Stamford Bridge on 1 November 2008, a 5–0 loss.

Waghorn joined Championship side Charlton Athletic on a month's loan on 17 November 2008. On 15 December 2008, Waghorn scored his first goal, in a 2–2 draw at home against Derby County. The loan deal was extended for a second month. He made seven appearances for the club in a season that would end in relegation to League One.

=== Leicester City ===
==== Loan ====
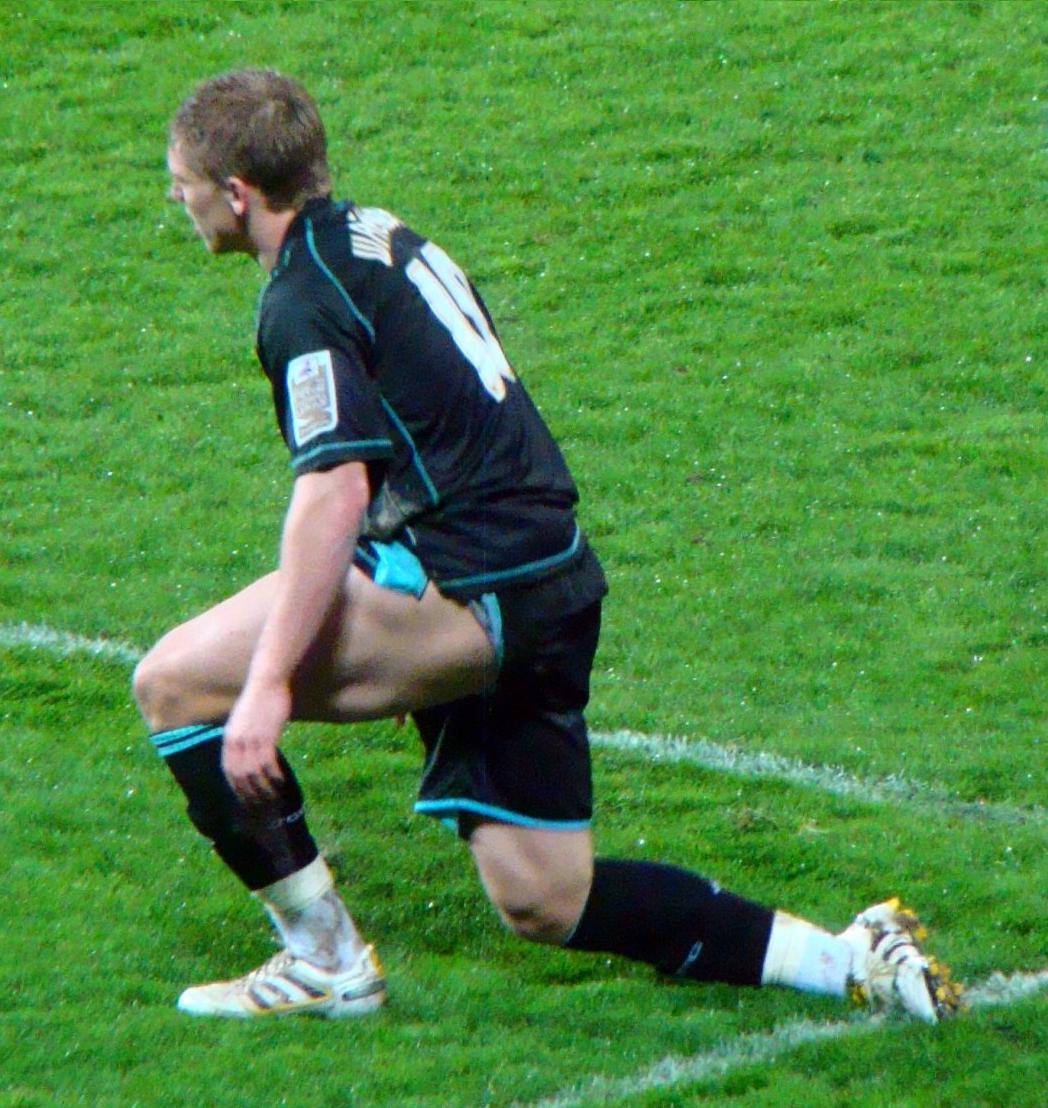
Waghorn playing for Leicester City in 2010

On 6 August 2009, Waghorn joined Leicester City on loan until 11 January 2010, having turned down interest from Carlisle United. Waghorn made his competitive debut for Leicester City as a substitute against Swansea City, scoring the equalising goal as Leicester City won 2–1. His first 11 games for Leicester City were all as a substitute, but Waghorn expressed his satisfaction as an impact player. He made his first league start for Leicester City against Reading, scoring the winning goal. Waghorn scored his first professional brace against Queens Park Rangers in a 4–0 win. His overall performance earned him the club's Young Player of the Year award on 28 April 2010. Waghorn missed the last penalty kick in a 4–3 defeat on penalties to Cardiff City in the Championship play-offs semi-final second leg on 12 May 2010. He scored 12 goals in 28 starts for the club during his loan period.

==== Permanent ====
On 31 August 2010, Waghorn rejoined Leicester City on a permanent deal for a fee rising to £3 million to help fund Sunderland's record signing Asamoah Gyan. He was disappointed with the lack of opportunities at his former club, and happily dropped down a division because the lure of playing regular football was too good to turn down. Waghorn made his debut in a 1–1 draw against Coventry City on 11 September 2010, scoring his first goal in a 4–3 defeat to Norwich City on 28 September 2010. He failed to win a regular place when Sven-Göran Eriksson became manager on 3 October 2010. Nonetheless, injury concerns at the club prevented Waghorn from joining Derby County on loan during the January 2011 transfer window. On 6 April 2011, a hamstring injury suffered during training ruled Waghorn out for the rest of the 2010–11 season.

Hull City completed the loan signing of Waghorn on 31 August 2011 which would have lasted until January 2012. He made his debut on 10 September 2011 in a 1–0 win at Peterborough United. On 27 September 2011 against Doncaster Rovers at the Keepmoat Stadium, Matty Fryatt found himself with space to deliver a low cross along the six-yard box and although Neil Sullivan might have been disappointed not to cut it out, Waghorn was there to apply the finish from close range. He returned to Leicester on 6 December 2011 after suffering a hamstring injury during his loan spell.

After making only two substitute appearances for Leicester, Waghorn joined Millwall on a three-month loan deal on 12 September 2013. He scored on his debut against Derby County on 14 September 2013. He scored his second goal for the club on 5 October 2013, in a 5–2 defeat against AFC Bournemouth.

=== Wigan Athletic ===
On 31 January 2014, Waghorn joined Wigan Athletic on loan until the end of the season. He made his debut on 8 February 2014 in a Championship match away to Huddersfield Town in a 1–0 defeat. His first goal for Wigan Athletic came against Barnsley ten days later. After scoring three goals in nine appearances, Waghorn joined Wigan Athletic permanently on 4 April 2014, on a free transfer.

=== Rangers ===
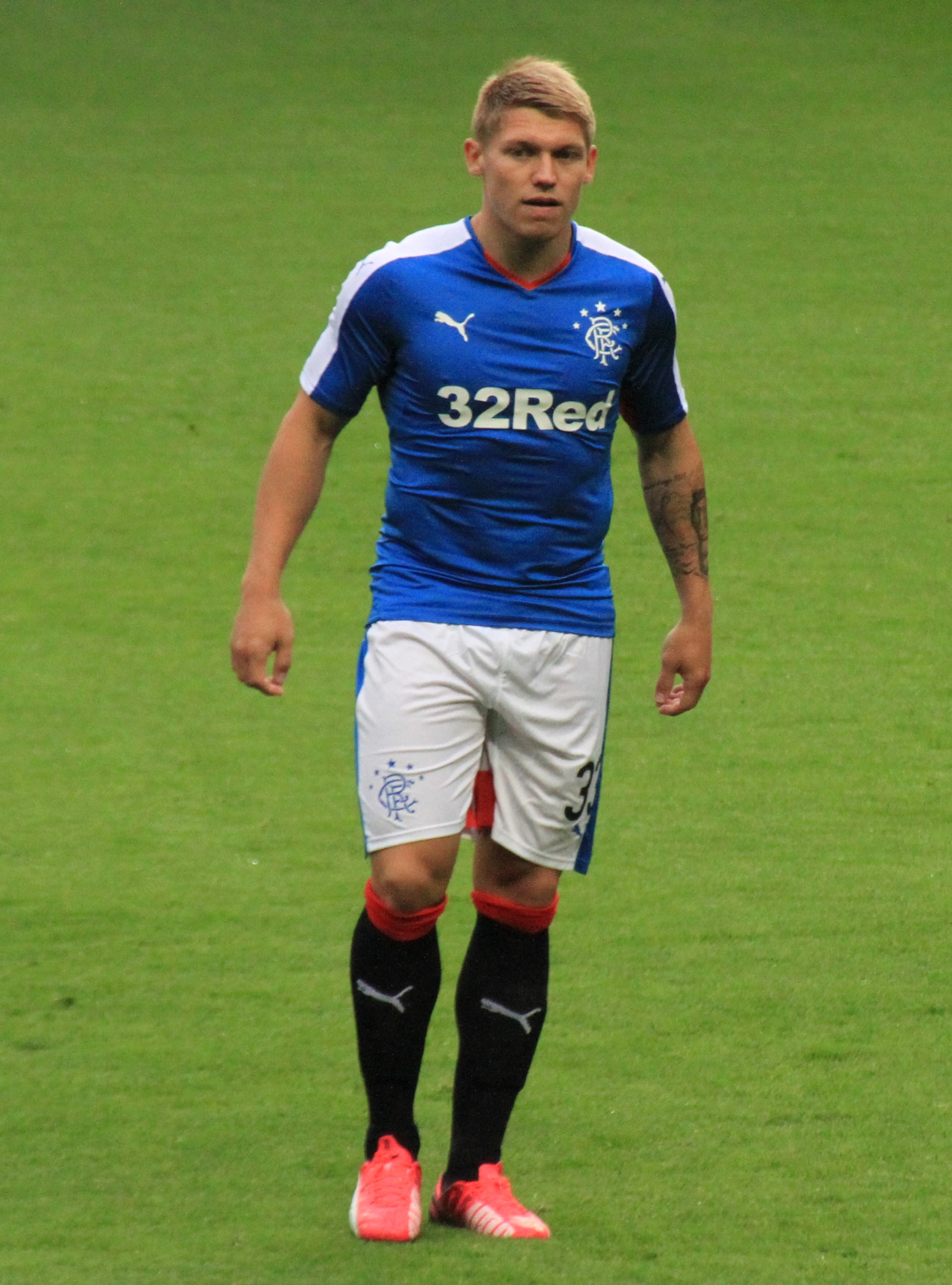
Waghorn playing for Rangers in 2015

On 20 July 2015, Waghorn signed a three-year deal with Scottish Championship side Rangers along with Wigan teammate James Tavernier. He continued using 33 as his squad number, as with previous clubs, due to superstition. Waghorn scored a double on his debut for Rangers in the Scottish Challenge Cup against Hibernian on 25 July 2015 in a 6–2 win. He netted twice from the penalty-spot in a 5–1 defeat of Queen of the South on 30 August 2015. He scored twice from the penalty spot again in a 5–0 win over Raith Rovers at Ibrox on 5 September 2015. His striking dominance continued when he scored two goals in a 2–1 win over Dumbarton on 21 September 2015.

He scored his first senior hat-trick in a 4–0 win over Greenock Morton on 27 September 2015, taking his league goal tally to 11 and his overall tally to 14, making him the leading goal scorer in the league. He received the Scottish Championship Player of the Month Award for September due to his performances on the pitch. He then scored two goals in a 4–0 victory against Alloa Athletic on 7 November 2015, taking his overall tally to 17 goals. He scored another treble in a 5–1 victory over Cowdenbeath in the fourth round of the Scottish Cup. On 16 February 2016, Waghorn sustained a knee ligament injury in Rangers's 2–1 win over Kilmarnock after being tackled by former Rangers defender Steven Smith and was ruled out for 6–8 weeks. He did not return until the final league match of the season against St Mirren on 1 May 2016. Waghorn also played in the 2016 Scottish Cup Final but could not prevent Rangers losing the match 3–2.

In the summer of 2016, Waghorn was offered a contract extension by Rangers, which was rejected. This led to him being linked with a possible move to Bristol City. However, it did not affect his goalscoring form, as Waghorn netted five in his first four games with strikes against Motherwell, Annan Athletic and a brace against Stranraer before scoring Rangers first Scottish Premiership goal of the season in a 1–1 draw at home to Hamilton Academical. In that same match against Hamilton Academical, Waghorn suffered a hamstring strain, which kept him out of football until mid-September 2016. Upon his return from injury, Waghorn struggled for goal-scoring form, although he did net the third hat-trick of his Rangers career in a League Cup match against Queen of the South. However, he did not score in the league from the opening day fixture until 16 December, when he netted a brace away to Hamilton Academical.

=== Ipswich Town ===
On 7 August 2017, Waghorn joined Ipswich Town on a two-year contract. Five days later, he scored the winning goal on his league debut, in a 2–1 victory over Barnsley. Following on from scoring on his debut, he scored a brace in the following league game in a 4–3 away win over Millwall at The Den. He scored in his third consecutive league appearance on 19 August, scoring in a 2–0 home win over Brentford at Portman Road. Waghorn became a regular starter in the Ipswich first-team during his first season at the club. On 6 March he netted a brace in a 2–1 away win over Sheffield Wednesday at Hillsborough, including scoring a late free-kick from outside the 18 yard box. He scored another brace on 2 April against Millwall in a match that ended in a 2–2 draw. He finished the season as the club's top scorer with 16 league goals.

=== Derby County ===
Waghorn was reportedly set to join Middlesbrough from Ipswich following the conclusion of the 2017/18 season. However Derby County swooped in at the last second and on 8 August 2018 he was announced as a Rams player. Upon signing, Waghorn became the seventh signing for Frank Lampard, and was given the number 9. He made his debut on 11 August in a 1–4 loss against Leeds United.

On the final day of the 2020/21 Season Derby hosted Sheffield Wednesday in which defeat for The Rams would have seen them relegated to League One at the expense of Wednesday. In what turned out to be his final game as a Derby player and with the score at 2–3 to the visitors Waghorn stepped up to take a penalty and by converting the spot kick which would ultimately turn out to be the last goal of the game, which saved the club from relegation.

=== Coventry City ===
On 2 July 2021, Waghorn joined Coventry City on a two-year contract following the expiration of his Derby contract.

In the 2021–22 season Waghorn struggled to hold down a consistent place in The Sky Blues' starting eleven and only managed to find the back of the net once over the course of the season which was the final goal in a 2–0 win against Middlesbrough at the Coventry Building Society Arena.

After 404 days, Wagehorn finally netted his second Sky Blues' goal with a vital penalty kick late on in a 1–0 win over Sheffield United.

=== Huddersfield Town (loan) ===
On 13 January 2023, Waghorn joined fellow EFL Championship side Huddersfield Town for the remainder of the 2022–23 season.

=== Return to Derby County ===
On 7 August 2023, Waghorn returned to League One club Derby County on a one-year deal. Waghorn scored five times in his first four appearances in League One in August 2023, including at hat-trick in a 4–2 victory at Peterborough United on 26 August 2023. In October 2023, Waghorn picked up a hamstring injury which ruled him out for a month. After a brief return of three weeks, Waghorn suffered a calf injury in December 2023. He was set to return in January 2024, but after a setback in his rehab he was ruled out for "foreseeable" by Derby head coach Paul Warne. Waghorn returned to action on 27 February 2024, against Charlton Athletic and scored his first goal in five months in a 3–0 win at Bristol Rovers on 9 March 2024. Waghorn made 27 appearances for Derby during the season, scoring seven times as they secured promotion to the Championship after finishing second-place in the League One table.

On 18 May 2024, it was announced that Waghorn would leave Derby at the end of his contract on 30 June 2024. In his two spells at Derby, Waghorn scored 37 times in 150 appearances.

=== Northampton Town ===
On 1 November 2024, Waghorn joined League One side Northampton Town on a short-term deal.

On 17 December 2024, he departed the club having had his contract terminated by mutual consent.

=== Retirement and non-league ===
On 13 February 2025, Waghorn retired from professional football aged 35, he played 527 games over a 17-year career, scoring 135 goals.

On 28 December 2025, Waghorn returned to playing, joining Northern Premier League Division One Midlands club Anstey Nomads.

== International career ==
Waghorn represented England at under-19 level twice, against Spain and Bosnia and Herzegovina.

Waghorn was included in the 27-man England under-21 squad to face both Azerbaijan and Israel in September 2011. He made his debut in the game against Azerbaijan, a 6–0 victory, and scored a goal in the 79th minute, having come on as a substitute 12 minutes earlier. In his second appearance for the under-21 team, Waghorn was in the starting line-up, scoring a header against Israel from an Alex Oxlade-Chamberlain cross.

== Career statistics ==
As of match played 14 December 2024

Appearances and goals by club, season and competition
Club	Season	League			National cup (Note: Includes FA Cup, Scottish Cup)		League cup (Note: Includes League Cup, Scottish League Cup)		Other		Total	
Club	Season	Division	Apps	Goals	Apps	Goals	Apps	Goals	Apps	Goals	Apps	Goals
Sunderland	2007–08	Premier League	3	0	1	0	0	0	—		4	0
Sunderland	2008–09	Premier League	1	0	0	0	0	0	—		1	0
Sunderland	2009–10	Premier League	0	0	0	0	0	0	—		0	0
Sunderland	2010–11	Premier League	2	0	0	0	1	0	—		3	0
Sunderland	Total		6	0	1	0	1	0	—		8	0
Charlton Athletic (loan)	2008–09	Championship	7	1	0	0	0	0	—		7	1
Leicester City (loan)	2009–10	Championship	43	12	1	0	1	0	2 (Note: Appearance(s) in Championship play-offs)	0	47	12
Leicester City	2010–11	Championship	30	4	2	0	0	0	—		32	4
Leicester City	2011–12	Championship	4	1	0	0	1	0	—		5	1
Leicester City	2012–13	Championship	24	3	3	0	1	0	0	0	28	3
Leicester City	2013–14	Championship	2	0	1	0	1	0	—		4	0
Leicester City	Total		103	20	7	0	4	0	2	0	116	20
Hull City (loan)	2011–12	Championship	5	1	0	0	0	0	—		5	1
Millwall (loan)	2013–14	Championship	14	3	0	0	0	0	—		14	3
Wigan Athletic (loan)	2013–14	Championship	9	3	0	0	0	0	—		9	3
Wigan Athletic	2013–14	Championship	6	2	0	0	0	0	2	0	8	2
Wigan Athletic	2014–15	Championship	23	3	0	0	1	0	—		24	3
Wigan Athletic	Total		38	8	0	0	1	0	2	0	41	8
Rangers	2015–16	Scottish Championship	25	20	4	4	3	1	4 (Note: Appearances in Scottish Challenge Cup)	3	36	28
Rangers	2016–17	Scottish Premiership	32	8	4	2	5	7	—		41	16
Rangers	2017–18	Scottish Premiership	0	0	0	0	0	0	1 (Note: Appearance in UEFA Europa League)	0	1	0
Rangers	Total		57	28	8	6	8	8	5	3	78	44
Ipswich Town	2017–18	Championship	44	16	1	0	1	0	—		46	16
Derby County	2018–19	Championship	36	9	4	2	3	2	1	0	44	13
Derby County	2019–20	Championship	43	12	4	0	0	0	—		47	12
Derby County	2020–21	Championship	32	5	0	0	0	0	—		32	5
Derby County	Total		111	26	8	2	3	2	1	0	123	30
Coventry City	2021–22	Championship	27	1	1	0	1	0	—		29	1
Coventry City	2022–23	Championship	11	1	1	0	1	0	—		13	1
Coventry City	Total		38	2	2	0	2	0	0	0	42	2
Huddersfield Town (loan)	2022–23	Championship	13	1	0	0	0	0	0	0	13	1
Derby County	2023–24	League One	24	7	1	0	1	0	1 (Note: Appearances in EFL Trophy)	0	27	7
Northampton Town	2024–25	League One	6	0	1	0	0	0	1	1	8	1
Career total			466	112	29	8	21	10	12	4	527	135

== Honours ==
Rangers

- Scottish Championship: 2015–16
- Scottish Challenge Cup: 2015–16

Derby County

- League One second-place promotion: 2023–24

Individual

- Leicester City Young Player of the Year: 2009–10
- Scottish Championship Player of the Month: September 2015
- Scottish Championship top scorer: 2015–16
- Rangers Players' Player of the Year: 2015–16
- PFA Scotland Team of the Year: 2015–16 Scottish Championship
