= Russell Perrett =

English footballer

Personal information
- Full name: Russell Perrett
- Date of birth: 18 June 1973 (age 53)
- Place of birth: Barton on Sea, England
- Height: 6 ft 1 in (1.85 m)
- Position: Defender

Senior career*
Years	Team	Apps	(Gls)
1994–1995	AFC Lymington	?	(?)
1995–1999	Portsmouth	72	(2)
1999–2001	Cardiff City	29	(1)
2001–2007	Luton Town	99	(9)
2007–2008	AFC Bournemouth	10	(0)
- * Club domestic league appearances and goals

Russell Perrett (born 18 June 1973) is an English former footballer who spent most of his career with Portsmouth and Luton Town. He started his career in non-league football with Lymington Town in the Wessex League where he holds the record as the youngest player to play in that league at age 14.

== Football career ==
After being released from Portsmouth, where he had completed a two-year apprenticeship, he went back to play for Lymington Town in the Wessex League. He spent four seasons there before undergoing a month-long trial back at Portsmouth and was offered a contract by the then manager, Terry Fenwick. He soon established himself in the first team and was rewarded with a three-year contract. The arrival of Alan Ball, who coincidentally signed Perrett as an apprentice on his first spell at Portsmouth, meant appearances were limited and Cardiff City's manager, Frank Burrows, signed him on a free transfer in 1999.

Burrows left and the arrival of ex-Wimbledon chairman Sam Hammam and manager Bobby Gould meant a total restructure of the club and Perrett was given a free transfer in 2001.

Perrett was signed by Luton Town's manager Joe Kinnear in summer 2001, after spells with AFC Lymington, Portsmouth and Cardiff City. He signed a new one-year deal in February 2007, but was deemed surplus to requirements by the new manager, Kevin Blackwell, and was released in July 2007 after six years at the club, winning one league title and two promotions. He subsequently signed for the League One side AFC Bournemouth on a one-year contract. He chose to retire on 7 May 2008 after suffering a bout of pleurisy which sidelined him for four months of his first season at the club.

== Honours ==
Luton Town

- Football League One: 2004–05
