= 2003–04 Luton Town F.C. season =

English football club season

Luton Town
2003–04 season
- Chairman: John Gurney (until 14 July 2003); In administrative receivership between 14 July 2003 – 12 May 2004; Bill Tomlins (from 12 May 2004)
- Manager: Mike Newell
- Football League Second Division: Tenth
- FA Cup: Fourth round
- Football League Cup: Second round
- Football League Trophy: Southern Section Quarter-Final
- Top goalscorer: League: Steve Howard (15); All: Steve Howard (16)
- Highest home attendance: 8,767 vs Tranmere Rovers (FA Cup Fourth Round, 24 January 2004)
- Lowest home attendance: 3,667 vs Thurrock (FA Cup First Round replay, 18 November 2003)
- Average home league attendance: 6,253
Home colours	Away colours

The 2003–04 season was the 118th season in the history of Luton Town Football Club, and club's 83rd consecutive year in the Football League. Luton finished in tenth place, a surprising success considering the financial issues that afflicted the club. Despite being placed in administrative receivership for the majority of the season following a turbulent change of ownership and having a rigorous transfer embargo imposed as a result, signing players only with the Football League's special dispensation, the club accrued more points than in the previous campaign.

The lack of spending power meant that numerous youth team players were promoted to the first-team squad, such as Kevin Foley, Curtis Davies, Keith Keane, and Leon Barnett; as well as players with no previous professional football experience, like Enoch Showunmi. These players would go on to form a crucial part of the Luton side in later years.

This article covers the period from 1 July 2003 to 30 June 2004.

== Background ==
The previous season had seen consolidation for Luton after their drop into the basement division of English league football in 2001, with the club finishing the 2002–03 season in ninth place. Stability did not last for long, however, as the end of the season saw controversy erupt after an unidentified consortium gained control of the club, later revealed to be headed by businessman John Gurney.

Gurney's first act was the sacking of successful managerial duo Joe Kinnear and Mick Harford, subsequently followed by a phone-poll to determine the next manager. Former Luton player and Hartlepool United manager Mike Newell was announced as the winner on 23 June 2003, though it is widely believed that Kinnear accumulated the most votes, only to reject a return to the club as he refused to work with Gurney.

In terms of playing staff, the end of the last season had seen six released; goalkeepers Carl Emberson and Mark Ovendale, defenders Duncan Jupp, Alan Kimble and Aaron Skelton, and striker Carl Griffiths. No replacements had been brought in, leaving Luton with a compact squad, albeit with a number of talented young players.

== Review ==
=== July ===
With the fallout surrounding the takeover still occurring, including the fact that players and staff had not been paid for two months, managing director John Gurney was summoned by the Football League to explain the situation. Striker Tony Thorpe voiced his thoughts on the matter, stating that the supporters needed to get behind the players and turn out for the first game of the season, responding to the fact that thousands of fans were deliberately not buying season tickets in an attempt to force the new owners out of the club. Defender Chris Coyne expressed a different view, praising the supporters for standing up for themselves and the club even though it meant he was not being paid.

On 11 July, the Football League met with Gurney and expressed "grave concern that the new owners... have been unable to satisfy [The League] of the club's financial stability going forward." As a result, Luton were placed under a transfer embargo and all payments due to the club from the authorities, such as sponsorship money and television rights, were to be withheld. In the weeks before this, Luton's supporters' trust, Trust in Luton, had devised a strategy to acquire shares in the club's major creditor, Hatters Holdings. Hatters Holdings, now majority-owned by Trust in Luton, deliberately placed the club into administrative receivership on 14 July to successfully force out John Gurney after a turbulent 55 days in charge. As a result, supporters began buying tickets again and the club hastily arranged friendly matches against Fulham, Hitchin Town and an Arsenal XI before the season began on 9 August. Despite ridding the club of Gurney, the club remained financially insecure and still had a transfer embargo in place, meaning Luton could only sign players on free transfers or on loan and, even then, only with dispensation from the authorities.

=== August and September ===
After being sacked alongside Joe Kinnear eight weeks earlier, Mick Harford returned to Luton on 6 August as Director of Football. Harford and manager Mike Newell had previously played together at Luton in 1986 and 1987, during the club's most successful period in the top division of English football.

A day before the season began, Luton were granted special dispensation from the Football League to sign a goalkeeper and an outfield player on loan. While the club elected to use youth team goalkeepers Rob Beckwith and Dean Brill, they did sign Portsmouth winger Courtney Pitt on a one-month loan. Pitt played in the opening game against Rushden & Diamonds as Luton won 3–1, Tony Thorpe scoring twice. A 2–1 victory in the next league game over Stockport County left Luton as early leaders of the Second Division.

On 22 August, Tony Thorpe joined Luton's rivals Queens Park Rangers for a £50,000 fee. It proved to be a transfer that angered many Luton supporters due to a combination of Thorpe's comments earlier in the season urging fans to get behind the team, QPR's status as Luton's rivals, and the fact that the club received such a small fee for a player perceived to be worth much more. The same day, as a result of funds being freed up by Thorpe's move, Luton signed young Coventry City striker Gary McSheffrey on a one-month loan.

The next three games saw two losses and a win. On 6 September, the club signed 21-year-old striker Enoch Showunmi on non-contract terms following special dispensation to sign an outfield player after captain Kevin Nicholls was injured for three months. Showunmi, who had no professional football experience and had previously played only for eleventh-tier club Willesden Constantine, had been on trial with Luton since August. Only one further win followed in September, leaving the club in fourteenth place in the table. Both McSheffrey and Pitt signed one-month extensions to their loans in late September, and the club allowed striker Dean Crowe, who had been injured for much of the past year, to join Third Division club York City on loan for a month.

Luton progressed to the second round of the League Cup, where they faced Premier League club Charlton Athletic. After a 4–4 draw at extra-time, earning praise from Charlton manager Alan Curbishley, Luton lost 8–7 on penalties.

=== October and November ===
Goalkeeper Rob Beckwith was suspended after being sent off in a 3–0 defeat to Oldham Athletic, meaning Luton had only one goalkeeper in the form of 18-year-old Dean Brill for an upcoming match with Wycombe Wanderers. They signed former player Nathan Abbey on non-contract terms on 10 October from Stevenage Borough to cover Brill's position.

The club endured a mixed month in the league during October, recording two wins, two draws and two losses, including a 6–3 defeat to AFC Bournemouth, as well as progressing to the second round of the Football League Trophy. An injury to regular striker Steve Howard pushed Adrian Forbes into a first-team role, where he excelled with six goals in six games, winning the award for October's top scorer in the division. In terms of transfers, Luton extended Gary McSheffrey's loan for a further month after he had scored eight goals in thirteen games and Nathan Abbey left after two weeks, the club signing experienced goalkeeper Marlon Beresford from Bradford City as a replacement on a three-month contract. Beresford joining meant that a player had to leave to satisfy the transfer embargo, and Courtney Pitt subsequently returned to Portsmouth after two months on loan.

November saw the team go unbeaten in the league, with wins also in the Football League Trophy and FA Cup. Adrian Forbes continued his goalscoring form, hitting four goals in six games as Luton moved to tenth in the table, one point from the play-off places. The successful run of form coincided with welcome news for the club off the pitch, with confirmation from the Companies Court on 21 November that the administrators now had the power to sell the club to an appropriate bidder, safeguarding the future of Luton Town. On 28 November, a bid from a company called Bill Tomlins Sport Management was received, with the administrators intending to meet with representatives in early December to progress the sale.

=== December and January ===
The team's good form continued into December, with two wins, a draw and one loss in the league leaving them in seventh place. Southend United knocked the club out of the Football League Trophy early in the month, but Luton did progress to the third round of the FA Cup with a 2–0 win over Rochdale. Gary McSheffrey left the club on 3 December with Luton unable to extend his loan further than the 93-day maximum.

January began with Luton beating Bradford City 2–1 in the FA Cup, ensuring the club reached the fourth round of the competition for the first time since the 1994–95 season. Two consecutive 2–2 draws left the club in ninth place in the league, but a 1–0 defeat to Tranmere Rovers in front of Kenilworth Road's biggest crowd of the season on 24 January knocked Luton out of the FA Cup.

Marlon Beresford left Luton on 26 January at the expiration of his contract, signing for divisional rivals Barnsley. Three days later, Luton signed a replacement in the form of Danish goalkeeper Morten Hyldgaard on a free transfer from Scottish Premier League side Hibernian until the end of the season.

=== February, March and April ===
Luton had a strong February in the league, picking up 13 out of a possible 18 points and moving into a play-off position. This set of results saw manager Mike Newell win the Manager of the Month award and striker Enoch Showunmi rewarded as Player of the Month. Earlier in the month, following a hat-trick in a 4–1 win over Brentford, Showunmi had signed a two-and-a-half-year professional contract.

On 13 February, preferred bidder Bill Tomlins stated that he hoped Luton would be out of administration within a week, assuming the handover of the club went smoothly. However, no news was heard for over a month, which only then confirmed that the transfer of ownership of the club was planned to take place on 31 March.

On the pitch, Luton started March in a similar fashion to February with a draw and a win to place themselves in sixth position, just inside the play-offs, with twelve games left to play. However, the club soon slipped down the league, with a loss and two draws pushing them into mid-table. Irish defender Kevin Foley, a regular in the Luton first-team despite officially being classed as a youth player, agreed a two-and-a-half-year professional contract on 10 March.

The end of the month also saw the closure of the transfer window, and the club released striker Dean Crowe, who had made only two starts all season. Crowe subsequently joined Oldham Athletic. With Crowe's wages freed up, Luton signed Rushden & Diamonds captain and left-back Paul Underwood on a free transfer following the League's approval.

In terms of financial issues, the planned date for transfer of ownership on 31 March passed without event, with the future of the club still in the balance. A series of statements throughout April informing that Luton Town would be out of administration "soon" also failed to yield any immediate positive outcome.

A poor run of results saw Luton pick up only one win from seven games in April, with a 2–1 defeat to Wrexham on 24 April confirming that the play-offs were mathematically out of reach.

=== May and June ===
A win and loss in the final two games in early May meant that Luton finished the season in tenth place, seven points away from a play-off place. Given the financial constraints placed on the team and chaotic conditions surrounding ownership, the season exceeded most supporter and pundit expectations.

On 12 May Bill Tomlins, head of the consortium buying Luton Town, confirmed the Football League had formally approved the purchase of the club from administrative receivership. Tomlins committed himself to building a new stadium on land purchased by previous chairman Mike Watson-Challis, with plans to open it in 2006. He also praised Trust in Luton for saving the club in July 2003.

Goalkeeper Morten Hyldgaard left the club on 14 May at the expiration of his contract, as did youth players Matthew Judge and Parys Okai. On 21 May, Luton turned down a bid from Sheffield Wednesday for top scorer Steve Howard. Initially, the bid was reported as being accepted, but it later came to light that a forged fax had been sent to Sheffield Wednesday apparently accepting the offer, while the official response from Luton had been to reject it. A day later, defender Chris Coyne and midfielder Steve Robinson both signed two-year contract extensions. On 27 May, youth players Curtis Davies, Rob Beckwith and Stephen O'Leary signed two-year professional contracts, while Michael Leary extended his own professional contract by a further two years. Defender Russell Perrett, who had been injured for the majority of the season, signed a one-year contract extension on 7 June. Ten days later, forward Adrian Forbes left the club on a free transfer to join Swansea City. On 23 June, goalkeeper Marlon Beresford agreed to return to Luton on a free transfer, with the deal taking place on 1 July at the opening of the transfer and player registration window. Midfielder Paul Hughes agreed to a two-year contract extension on 26 June, as Mike Newell continued to commit players to Luton for the next season.

== Match results ==
Luton Town results given first.

=== Legend ===
Win	Draw	Loss

=== Friendlies ===
Date	Opponent	Venue	Result	Attendance	Scorers	Notes
15 July 2003	Fulham	Neutral	0–1	N/A	–	
19 July 2003	Hitchin Town	Away	0–0	858	–	
22 July 2003	Arsenal XI	Neutral	1–0	N/A	Howard	

=== Football League Second Division ===
All results, goals, attendances etc. taken from Soccerbase and verified with official Luton Town match reports.

Date	Opponent	Venue	Result	Attendance	Scorers	Notes
9 August 2003	Rushden & Diamonds	Home	3–1	6,878	Thorpe (2), Spring	
16 August 2003	Stockport County	Away	2–1	4,566	Neilson, Howard	
23 August 2003	Grimsby Town	Home	1–2	5,827	Nicholls (pen)	
25 August 2003	Brighton & Hove Albion	Away	0–2	6,604	–	
30 August 2003	Hartlepool United	Home	3–2	5,515	Howard (2), McSheffrey	
6 September 2003	Notts County	Away	1–1	7,505	Coyne	
13 September 2003	Plymouth Argyle	Away	1–2	9,894	McSheffrey	
16 September 2003	Port Vale	Home	2–0	5,079	McSheffrey, Foley	
20 September 2003	Queens Park Rangers	Home	1–1	8,339	Howard	
27 September 2003	Oldham Athletic	Away	0–3	6,077	–	
1 October 2003	Swindon Town	Away	2–2	7,573	McSheffrey (pen), Forbes	
6 October 2003	Tranmere Rovers	Home	3–1	5,002	Perrett, McSheffrey, Forbes	
11 October 2003	Wycombe Wanderers	Home	3–1	5,595	McSheffrey (2), Perrett	
18 October 2003	Brentford	Away	2–4	5,579	Forbes (2)	
21 October 2003	AFC Bournemouth	Away	3–6	6,388	own goal, Hughes, Forbes	
25 October 2003	Peterborough United	Home	1–1	6,067	Forbes	
1 November 2003	Bristol City	Away	1–1	9,735	McSheffrey	
15 November 2003	Wrexham	Home	3–2	5,505	Forbes, Robinson, Mansell	
22 November 2003	Sheffield Wednesday	Away	0–0	21,027	–	
29 November 2003	Chesterfield	Home	1–0	5,453	Howard	
13 December 2003	Blackpool	Away	1–0	5,739	Robinson	
20 December 2003	Barnsley	Home	0–1	6,162	–	
26 December 2003	Colchester United	Away	1–1	5,083	Mansell	
28 December 2003	Notts County	Home	2–0	7,181	Forbes, Boyce	
10 January 2004	Rushden & Diamonds	Away	2–2	5,823	Forbes, Holmes	
17 January 2004	Stockport County	Home	2–2	5,920	own goal, Howard	
7 February 2004	Colchester United	Home	1–0	5,662	Showunmi	
10 February 2004	Brighton & Hove Albion	Home	2–0	6,846	Holmes, Nicholls (pen)	
14 February 2004	Wycombe Wanderers	Away	0–0	6,407	–	
21 February 2004	Brentford	Home	4–1	6,273	Boyce, Showunmi (3)	
24 February 2004	Grimsby Town	Away	2–3	3,143	Howard (2)	
28 February 2004	Peterborough United	Away	2–1	6,628	Howard, Brkovic	
6 March 2004	Barnsley	Away	0–0	8,656	–	
13 March 2004	Blackpool	Home	3–2	6,343	Boyce, Holmes, Showunmi	
16 March 2004	Port Vale	Away	0–1	5,048	–	
20 March 2004	Plymouth Argyle	Home	1–1	8,499	Coyne	
27 March 2004	Queens Park Rangers	Away	1–1	17,695	Showunmi	
3 April 2004	Oldham Athletic	Home	1–1	5,966	Showunmi	
6 April 2004	Hartlepool United	Away	3–4	4,434	Howard, Leary (2)	
10 April 2004	Tranmere Rovers	Away	0–1	7,937	–	
12 April 2004	Swindon Town	Home	0–3	7,008	–	
17 April 2004	Bristol City	Home	3–2	6,944	Howard, Boyce, Keane	
20 April 2004	AFC Bournemouth	Home	1–1	6,485	Howard	
24 April 2004	Wrexham	Away	1–2	3,239	Howard	
1 May 2004	Sheffield Wednesday	Home	3–2	7,157	Howard (2), O'Leary	
8 May 2004	Chesterfield	Away	0–1	6,285	–	

=== FA Cup ===
Round	Date	Opponent	Venue	Result	Attendance	Scorers	Notes
First round	7 November 2003	Thurrock	Away	1–1	1,551	Boyce	
First round replay	18 November 2003	Thurrock	Home	3–1	3,667	Forbes (3)	
Second round	6 December 2003	Rochdale	Away	2–0	2,807	Robinson (pen), Mansell	
Third round	3 January 2004	Bradford City	Away	2–1	8,222	Forbes (2)	
Fourth round	24 January 2004	Tranmere Rovers	Home	0–1	8,767	–	

=== Football League Cup ===
Round	Date	Opponent	Venue	Result	Attendance	Scorers	Notes
First round	12 August 2003	Yeovil Town	Home	4–1	4,337	Foley, Thorpe, Pitt, Howard	
Second round	23 September 2003	Charlton Athletic	Away	4–4 (aet)	10,905	Foley, Bayliss, McSheffrey, Coyne	^{[A]}

=== Football League Trophy ===
Round	Date	Opponent	Venue	Result	Attendance	Scorers	Notes
First round	14 October 2003	Stevenage Borough	Away	1–0	1,754	Judge	
Second round	4 November 2003	Rushden & Diamonds	Away	2–1	2,746	Showunmi, Leary (pen)	
Quarter-final	9 December 2003	Southend United	Away	0–3	2,027	–	

== League table ==
Pos	Team	Pld	W	D	L	GF	GA	GD	Pts
8	Tranmere Rovers	46	17	16	13	59	56	+3	67
9	Bournemouth	46	17	15	14	56	51	+5	66
10	Luton Town	46	17	15	14	69	66	+3	66
11	Colchester United	46	17	13	16	52	56	−4	64
12	Barnsley	46	15	17	14	54	58	−4	62

Rules for classification: In the Football League goals scored (GF) takes precedence over goal difference (GD).

== Player statistics ==
Last match played on 8 May 2004. Players with a zero in every column only appeared as unused substitutes.

No.	Pos.	Name	League		FA Cup		League Cup		FL Trophy		Total		Discipline	
No.	Pos.	Name	Apps	Goals	Apps	Goals	Apps	Goals	Apps	Goals	Apps	Goals	Yellow card	Red card
1	GK	(Denmark) Morten Hyldgaard	18	0	0	0	0	0	0	0	18	0	0	0
3	DF	(Wales) Alan Neilson	11 (3)	1	0	0	1	0	0	0	12 (3)	1	1	0
4	MF	(England) Matthew Spring	24	1	3	0	2	0	1	0	30	1	6	0
5	DF	(England) Russell Perrett	5 (1)	2	0	0	0	0	0	0	5 (1)	2	4	0
6	DF	(England) Paul Underwood	1	0	0	0	0	0	0	0	1	0	0	0
7	MF	(England) Adrian Forbes	21 (6)	9	4	5	0	0	0 (1)	0	25 (7)	14	4	1
8	MF	(England) Kevin Nicholls	21	2	1	0	1	0	0	0	23	2	4	1
9	FW	(England) Tony Thorpe	2	2	0	0	1	1	0	0	3	3	0	0
11	MF	(Northern Ireland) Steve Robinson	32 (2)	2	4	1	0	0	2	0	38 (2)	3	5	0
12	DF	(Australia) Chris Coyne	44	2	5	0	2	1	2	0	53	3	7	0
14	MF	(England) Courtney Pitt	11 (1)	0	0	0	1 (1)	1	0	0	12 (2)	1	1	0
15	FW	(England) Dean Crowe	0 (8)	0	0 (3)	0	0 (1)	0	2	0	2 (12)	0	1	0
16	FW	(Nigeria) Enoch Showunmi	18 (8)	7	2	0	0	0	2 (1)	1	22 (9)	8	3	0
17	DF	(Barbados) Emmerson Boyce	42	4	5	1	2	0	0	0	49	5	7	0
18	MF	(Croatia) Ahmet Brković	24 (8)	1	5	0	1	0	2	0	32 (8)	1	3	0
19	FW	(Scotland) Steve Howard	34	15	3	0	2	1	1	0	40	16	10	1
20	DF	(England) Curtis Davies	4 (2)	0	0	0	0	0	0 (1)	0	4 (3)	0	2	0
21	MF	(England) Paul Hughes	20 (2)	1	0	0	2	0	0	0	22 (2)	1	5	1
22	DF	(England) David Bayliss	6	0	0	0	1	1	0	0	7	1	4	0
23	MF	(Wales) Ian Hillier	8 (3)	0	2 (1)	0	0 (1)	0	3	0	13 (5)	0	3	1
24	DF	(England) Sol Davis	34 (2)	0	4	0	1 (1)	0	3	0	42 (3)	0	14	2
25	FW	(England) Gary McSheffrey	18	8	0	0	1	1	0	0	19	9	3	0
26	MF	(Republic of Ireland) Keith Keane	14 (1)	1	0 (1)	0	0	0	1	0	15 (2)	1	1	0
27	MF	(England) Peter Holmes	11 (5)	3	2 (1)	0	0	0	1	0	14 (6)	3	3	0
29	GK	(England) Marlon Beresford	11	0	5	0	0	0	1	0	17	0	0	0
32	MF	(England) Lee Mansell	12 (4)	2	5	1	0	0	3	0	20 (4)	3	3	0
33	GK	(England) Dean Brill	4 (1)	0	0	0	0	0	2	0	6 (1)	0	0	0
35	GK	(England) Nathan Abbey	0	0	0	0	0	0	0	0	0	0	0	0
36	DF	(England) Joe Deeney	0	0	0	0	0	0	1 (1)	0	1 (1)	0	0	0
38	MF	(England) Michael Leary	8 (6)	2	1 (1)	0	0 (1)	0	2 (1)	1	11 (9)	3	5	0
39	MF	(Republic of Ireland) Stephen O'Leary	3 (2)	1	0	0	0	0	1	0	4 (2)	1	2	0
41	DF	(Republic of Ireland) Kevin Foley	32 (1)	1	3	0	2	2	0	0	37 (1)	3	4	0
43	FW	(England) Matthew Judge	0 (1)	0	0	0	0	0	1 (1)	1	0 (2)	1	0	0
44	MF	(England) Parys Okai	0	0	0 (1)	0	0 (1)	0	1	0	1 (2)	0	0	0
45	DF	(England) Leon Barnett	0	0	1	0	0	0	2	0	3	0	1	0
47	GK	(England) Rob Beckwith	13	0	0	0	2	0	0	0	15	0	0	1

== Managerial statistics ==
Only competitive games from the 2003–04 season are included.

Name	Nat.	From	To	Record							Honours
Name	Nat.	From	To	PLD	W	D	L	GF	GA	W%	Honours
Mike Newell	(England)	23 June 2003	15 March 2007	56	23	17	16	88	79	41.1	

== Awards ==
Awarded on 2 May 2004.

Award	Name	No.	Pos.	Notes
Supporters' Player of the Season	(Barbados) Emmerson Boyce	17	DF	
Players' Player of the Season	(Barbados) Emmerson Boyce	17	DF	
Internet Player of the Season	(Barbados) Emmerson Boyce	17	DF	
Young Player of the Season	(Republic of Ireland) Kevin Foley	41	DF	
Young Members' Player of the Season	(Nigeria) Enoch Showunmi	16	FW	
Goal of the Season	(Northern Ireland) Steve Robinson	11	MF	^{[B]}

== Transfers ==
=== In ===
Date	Player	From	Fee	Ref.
6 September 2003	(Nigeria) Enoch Showunmi	Unattached		
10 October 2003	(England) Nathan Abbey	Stevenage Borough	Free	
24 October 2003	(England) Marlon Beresford	Bradford City	Free	
29 January 2004	(Denmark) Morten Hyldgaard	Hibernian	Free	
25 March 2004	(England) Paul Underwood	Rushden & Diamonds	Free	

=== Out ===
Date	Player	To	Fee	Ref.
22 August 2003	(England) Tony Thorpe	Queens Park Rangers	£50,000	
24 October 2003	(England) Nathan Abbey	Macclesfield Town	Free	
26 January 2004	(England) Marlon Beresford	Barnsley	Free	
25 March 2004	(England) Dean Crowe	Oldham Athletic	Free	
12 May 2004	(England) Matthew Judge	Dagenham & Redbridge	Free	
12 May 2004	(England) Parys Okai	Cambridge United	Free	
14 May 2004	(Denmark) Morten Hyldgaard	Esbjerg fB	Free	
17 June 2004	(England) Adrian Forbes	Swansea City	Free	

=== Loans in ===
Date	Player	From	End date	Ref.
8 August 2003	(England) Courtney Pitt	Portsmouth	22 October 2003	
22 August 2003	(England) Gary McSheffrey	Coventry City	3 December 2003	

=== Loans out ===
Date	Player	To	End date	Ref.
26 September 2003	(England) Dean Crowe	York City	26 October 2003	

== See also ==
- List of Luton Town F.C. seasons

== Footnotes ==
A. Luton lost 8–7 in a penalty shootout
B. The goal of the season was awarded to Steve Robinson's strike against Blackpool on 13 December 2003.
