= History of Luton Town F.C. =

The history of Luton Town Football Club is described in detail in two separate articles:

- History of Luton Town F.C. (1885–1970) – the club was founded in 1885 and became the first professional team in southern England in 1891. After joining The Football League for the 1897–98 season and leaving after three seasons due to financial problems, the club rejoined the League before 1920–21, won the Third Division South in 1936–37 and was promoted the League's top division for the 1955–56 season. After losing the 1959 FA Cup Final 2–1 to Nottingham Forest, a period of decline saw Luton in the Fourth Division by 1965–66; however, Luton were back in the Second Division by 1970–71.
- History of Luton Town F.C. (1970–present) – the side was promoted to the top-flight in 1981–82 and won the 1987–88 League Cup Final with a 3–2 victory over Arsenal. The club stayed in the top division until 1992, before inconsistent performance and financial uncertainty saw Luton yo-yo between the divisions during the 1990s and 2000s. The 2006–07 season marked the beginning of a collapse that would make up three successive relegations. The third of these, from the fourth-tier League Two to the Conference Premier at the end of the 2008–09 season, resulted largely from the deduction of 40 points over the previous two seasons for various financial irregularities.
