= 2010–11 Wolverhampton Wanderers F.C. season =

English football club season

Wolverhampton Wanderers
2010–11 season
- Chairman: Steve Morgan OBE
- Manager: Mick McCarthy
- Premier League: 17th
- FA Cup: 4th round
- League Cup: 4th round
- Top goalscorer: League: Steven Fletcher (10); All: Steven Fletcher (12)
- Highest home attendance: 29,086 (vs Blackpool, 26 February 2011)
- Lowest home attendance: 10,031 (vs Doncaster, 18 January 2011)
- Average home league attendance: 27,696
Home colours	Away colours

The 2010–11 season was the 112th season of competitive league football in the history of English football club Wolverhampton Wanderers. The club competed in the Premier League, the highest level of English football, for a second consecutive season.

Although this season was the club's 62nd at the top level of English football, it was the first time they had faced consecutive campaigns in the highest division since 1981–82. The previous season had seen them survive their return to the highest level with a 15th-place finish, eight points above the relegation zone.

The club survived for a second successive season after finishing 17th, one place above the relegation zone. Despite losing their final fixture, results elsewhere on the final day kept Wolves one point ahead of the bottom three teams.

== Season review ==
Preparing for their second consecutive season in the Premier League, the club made five new additions. Beside turning the loan of Adlène Guedioura into a permanent deal, the summer also saw the arrival of Belgian international defender Jelle Van Damme, and two players captured from relegated Hull City - Steven Mouyokolo and Stephen Hunt; the latter ending a pursuit that had begun during the previous transfer window. Their most expensive new addition was striker Steven Fletcher who equalled the club's record fee of £6.5 million in joining from another relegated side, Burnley. For a third successive season, England under-21 defender Michael Mancienne joined on loan from Chelsea.

Those players not involved in the World Cup Finals resumed training at their Sir Jack Hayward training ground on 28 June, before travelling for a four-day stay in Dublin, where they undertook their first pre-season game. Preparations were completed with the only home friendly, a game against La Liga side Atletico Bilbao.

Competitive action began with a 2–1 victory over Stoke City, the first opening game Wolves had won since 1999. Two successive draws followed to push them up to fourth place, the highest position the club had occupied in the English football system since October 1979. However, after losing their unbeaten start with an injury time defeat at Fulham, the team tumbled down the table after a run of five defeats in their next six games.

Three points were finally gained after defeating big-spending Manchester City in late October, but a run of four successive losses followed. Two late goals at home to Sunderland swung the game in Wolves' favour to keep them in touch with fellow strugglers Wigan and West Ham at the end of November. December brought two defeats, but also two much-needed victories - against local rivals Birmingham City, and a shock win at Anfield; their first since 1984.

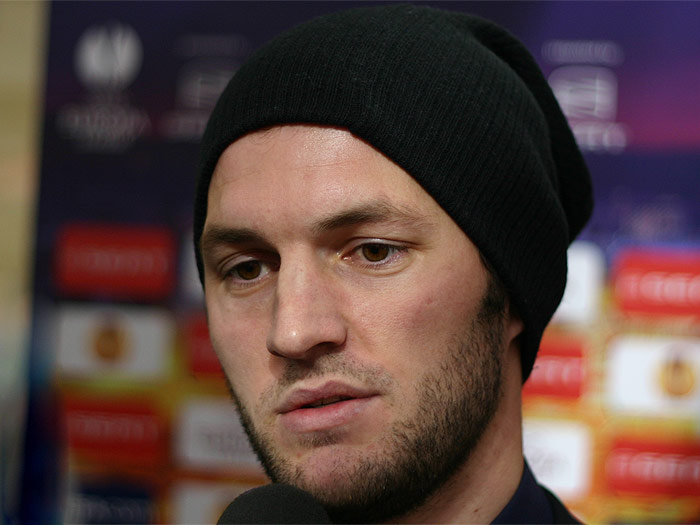
Jelle Van Damme returned to Belgium after just a five-month stay at Wolves having struggled to adapt to England.

The January transfer window saw the exit of Jelle Van Damme, who returned to Belgium after failing to settle in England. Two young players arrived in permanent deals - winger Adam Hammill from Championship team Barnsley, and Scottish forward Leigh Griffiths. On the field, the year began with a loss at relegation rivals West Ham before an unexpected win at home to reigning champions Chelsea. Three successive league defeats, and an exit from the FA Cup followed, before the team again turned the table on its head by ending Manchester United's 29-match unbeaten streak.

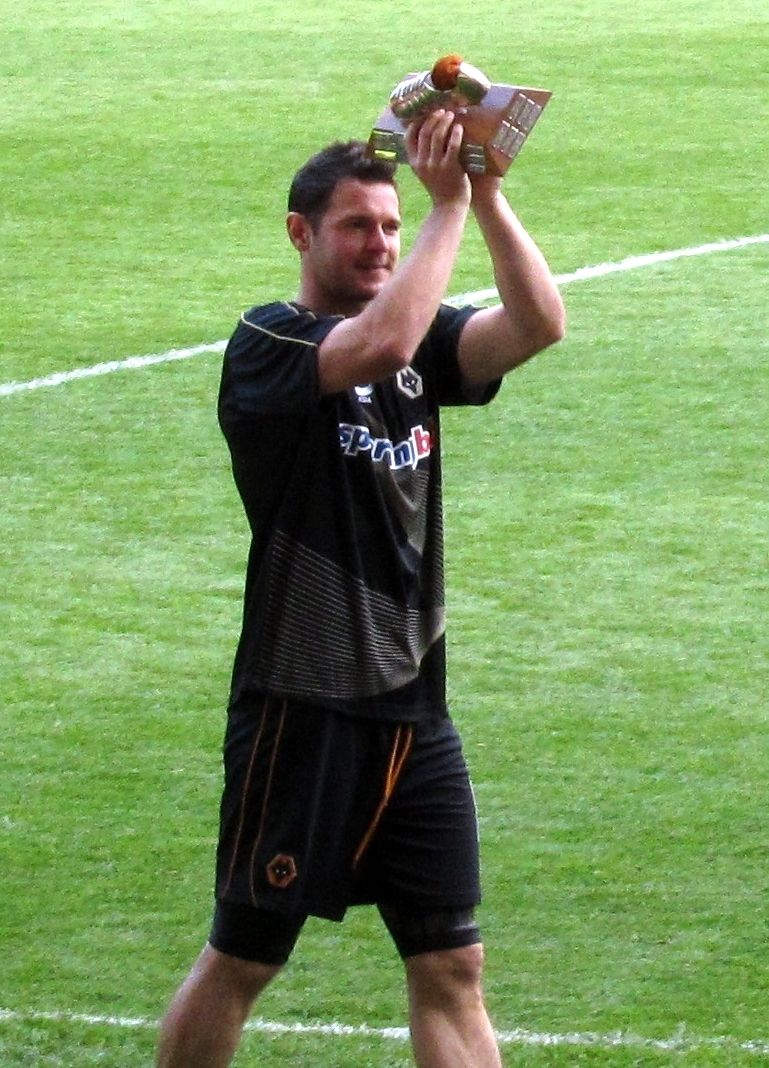
Matt Jarvis collects his Player of the Season award after the final game.

The first Black Country derby in the top flight for 27 years arrived in February, after snow had caused the original December date to be postponed. The game ended all square, but only after West Bromwich Albion had canceled out loanee Jamie O'Hara's opener with a stoppage time equaliser. The next weekend saw Wolves record their biggest victory of the Premier League era, as they thumped Blackpool 4–0 to lift themselves out of the relegation zone for the first time since September. Four more points then followed, after games with Tottenham and Aston Villa.

April brought the news that striker Kevin Doyle had suffered ligament damage while on international duty with the Republic of Ireland and would struggle to feature again during the season. As manager Mick McCarthy switched formations and line-ups to try to replace Doyle as the spearhead of a 4–5–1 formation, the team endured a run of just two points from a possible 15. With three games remaining the team remained in the drop zone, but in touch with a number of other clubs. The renewed goalscoring form of Steven Fletcher, helped yield two successive 3–1 victories that clawed the team out of the relegation zone before the final day.

The final day of the 2010–11 season featured one of the tightest ever relegation battles. At the start of the day, six teams had still not assured their safety - with one, West Ham, already condemned to relegation. The remaining two places could potentially be filled by Wolves, Blackburn, Birmingham, Blackpool or Wigan. Wolves faced Blackburn at Molineux in the final game to feature the North Bank stand that had stood since 1992.

A dismal first half performance left the home side 0–3 down at the half time interval, meaning they occupied a relegation place. Despite moving up to 17th after Birmingham fell behind at Tottenham early in the second half, two key goals in the same minute sunk Wolves back into the mire as Birmingham equalised, and Wigan took the lead in their game at Stoke. With just three minutes remaining at Molineux, a goal by Stephen Hunt reduced the deficit to 2–3, meaning Wolves were safe by virtue of goals scored (having tied Birmingham on points and goal difference). An injury time goal by Tottenham then ended all doubt and sent Birmingham down, along with Blackpool who had eventually lost at champions Manchester United despite having at one point led.

Wolves had survived in 17th place, on 40 points, a two-point improvement on the previous campaign despite a much more nervous finale.

== Results ==
=== Preseason ===
Wolves' seven pre season games saw them face opposition from five different leagues. As had become common in recent years, only their final game was held at their Molineux home. A second "Wolves Development XI" team largely comprising academy prospects also played a series of matches during this period.

17 July 2010	Bohemians	0–3	Wolverhampton Wanderers	Dublin
15:00 BST		Report	Craddock 6'; Fletcher 61'; Mujangi Bia 90+2'	Stadium: Dalymount Park; Referee: Richie Winter

20 July 2010	Walsall	0–4	Wolverhampton Wanderers	Walsall
19:45 BST		Report	Hemmings 11'; Vokes 37', 43'; Ebanks-Blake 66'	Stadium: Banks's Stadium; Attendance: 4,963; Referee: Rob Lewis

24 July 2010	RSC Charleroi	1–2	Wolverhampton Wanderers	Charleroi
19:00 BST	Tormena 59'	Report	Doyle 52'; Edwards 83'	Stadium: Stade du Pays de Charleroi; Referee: Laurent Colemonts

27 July 2010	Reading	2–1	Wolverhampton Wanderers	Reading
20:00 BST	Sigurðsson 10' (pen.); Antonio 71'	Report	Jones 80'	Stadium: Madejski Stadium; Attendance: 6,628; Referee: Iain Williamson

31 July 2010	Leeds United	3–1	Wolverhampton Wanderers	Leeds
15:00 BST	Gradel 36'; Sam 49'; Johnson 85'	Report	Jarvis 45+1'	Stadium: Elland Road; Attendance: 12,979; Referee: Nigel Miller

3 August 2010	Heart of Midlothian	0–2	Wolverhampton Wanderers	Edinburgh
19:00 BST		Report	Halford 4'; Ward 18'	Stadium: Tynecastle; Attendance: 5,660; Referee: Dougie McDonald

7 August 2010	Wolverhampton Wanderers	2–1	Athletic Bilbao	Wolverhampton
15:00 BST	Fletcher 15'; Ebanks-Blake 65'	Report	López 36'	Stadium: Molineux; Attendance: 17,502; Referee: Lee Mason

"Wolves Development XI" pre season results (all away): 4–1 v Lisburn Distillery (15 July), 1–0 v Glenavon (17 July), 0–2 v Newport County (23 July), 1–0 v Cheltenham Town (30 July), 7–1 v Chasetown (2 August), 4–2 v Telford United (10 August)

=== Premier League ===
A total of 20 teams competed in the Premier League in the 2010–11 season. Each team played every other team twice: once at their stadium, and once at the opposition's. Three points were awarded to teams for each win, one point per draw, and none for defeats.

The provisional fixture list was released on 17 June 2010, but was subject to change in the event of matches being selected for television coverage or police concerns.

14 August 2010 1	Wolverhampton Wanderers	2–1	Stoke City	Wolverhampton
15:00 BST	Jones 37'; Fletcher 39'	Report	Faye 55'	Stadium: Molineux; Attendance: 27,850 (2,600 away fans); Referee: Lee Probert

21 August 2010 2	Everton	1–1	Wolverhampton Wanderers	Liverpool
15:00 BST	Cahill 43'	Report	Ebanks-Blake 74'	Stadium: Goodison Park; Attendance: 37,767 (2,857 away fans); Referee: Lee Mason

28 August 2010 3	Wolverhampton Wanderers	1–1	Newcastle United	Wolverhampton
15:00 BST	Ebanks-Blake 43'	Report	Carroll 62'	Stadium: Molineux; Attendance: 27,745 (1,500 away fans); Referee: Stuart Attwell

11 September 2010 4	Fulham	2–1	Wolverhampton Wanderers	London
15:00 BST	Dembélé 49', 90+1'	Report	Van Damme 10'	Stadium: Craven Cottage; Attendance: 25,280 (1,566 away fans); Referee: Phil Dowd

18 September 2010 5	Tottenham Hotspur	3–1	Wolverhampton Wanderers	London
15:00 BST	van der Vaart 77' (pen.); Pavlyuchenko 87'; Hutton 90+1'	Report	Fletcher 45'	Stadium: White Hart Lane; Attendance: 35,940 (1,700 away fans); Referee: Mike Jones

26 September 2010 6	Wolverhampton Wanderers	1–2	Aston Villa	Wolverhampton
14:05 BST	Jarvis 61'	Report	Downing 27'; Heskey 88'	Stadium: Molineux; Attendance: 27,511 (2,596 away fans); Referee: Mark Halsey

2 October 2010 7	Wigan Athletic	2–0	Wolverhampton Wanderers	Wigan
12:45 BST	Gómez 65'; Rodallega 85'	Report		Stadium: DW Stadium; Attendance: 14,042 (2,088 away fans); Referee: Lee Mason

16 October 2010 8	Wolverhampton Wanderers	1–1	West Ham United	Wolverhampton
15:00 BST	Jarvis 10'	Report	Noble 53' (pen.)	Stadium: Molineux; Attendance: 28,582 (2,591 away fans); Referee: Mark Clattenburg

23 October 2010 9	Chelsea	2–0	Wolverhampton Wanderers	London
15:00 BST	Malouda 23'; Kalou 81'	Report		Stadium: Stamford Bridge; Attendance: 41,752 (1,475 away fans); Referee: Lee Probert

30 October 2010 10	Wolverhampton Wanderers	2–1	Manchester City	Wolverhampton
15:00 BST	Milijaš 30'; Edwards 57'	Report	Adebayor 23' (pen.)	Stadium: Molineux; Attendance: 25,971 (2,588 away fans); Referee: Mike Dean

6 November 2010 11	Manchester United	2–1	Wolverhampton Wanderers	Manchester
15:00 GMT	Park 45', 90+3'	Report	Ebanks-Blake 66'	Stadium: Old Trafford; Attendance: 75,285 (1,886 away fans); Referee: Phil Dowd

10 November 2010 12	Wolverhampton Wanderers	0–2	Arsenal	Wolverhampton
19:45 GMT		Report	Chamakh 1', 90+4'	Stadium: Molineux; Attendance: 27,329 (2,600 away fans); Referee: Mark Halsey

13 November 2010 13	Wolverhampton Wanderers	2–3	Bolton Wanderers	Wolverhampton
15:00 GMT	Foley 69'; Fletcher 77'	Report	Stearman 1' (o.g.); Elmander 62'; Holden 67'	Stadium: Molineux; Attendance: 27,508 (994 away fans); Referee: Peter Walton

20 November 2010 14	Blackpool	2–1	Wolverhampton Wanderers	Blackpool
15:00 GMT	Varney 3'; Harewood 44'	Report	Doyle 86'	Stadium: Bloomfield Road; Attendance: 15,922 (2,140 away fans); Referee: Mark Clattenburg

27 November 2010 15	Wolverhampton Wanderers	3–2	Sunderland	Wolverhampton
15:00 GMT	Foley 50'; Hunt 81'; Ebanks-Blake 89'	Report	Bent 67'; Welbeck 77'	Stadium: Molineux; Attendance: 25,112 (1,500 away fans); Referee: Mike Jones

4 December 2010 16	Blackburn Rovers	3–0	Wolverhampton Wanderers	Blackburn
15:00 GMT	Dunn 29'; Emerton 43'; Nelsen 55'	Report		Stadium: Ewood Park; Attendance: 22,314 (2,356 away fans); Referee: Howard Webb

12 December 2010 17	Wolverhampton Wanderers	1–0	Birmingham City	Wolverhampton
13:30 GMT	Hunt 45'	Report		Stadium: Molineux; Attendance: 25,150 (2,287 away fans); Referee: Martin Atkinson

26 December 2010 18	Wolverhampton Wanderers	1–2	Wigan Athletic	Wolverhampton
15:00 GMT	Fletcher 87'	Report	Rodallega 9'; Cleverley 20'	Stadium: Molineux; Attendance: 26,901 (604 away fans); Referee: Mike Dean

29 December 2010 19	Liverpool	0–1	Wolverhampton Wanderers	Liverpool
20:00 GMT		Report	Ward 56'	Stadium: Anfield; Attendance: 41,614 (1,771 away fans); Referee: Peter Walton

1 January 2011 20	West Ham United	2–0	Wolverhampton Wanderers	London
15:00 GMT	Zubar 51' (o.g.); Sears 79'	Report		Stadium: Upton Park; Attendance: 33,500 (2,053 away fans); Referee: Lee Probert

5 January 2011 21	Wolverhampton Wanderers	1–0	Chelsea	Wolverhampton
19:45 GMT	Bosingwa 5' (o.g.)	Report		Stadium: Molineux; Attendance: 26,432 (2,436 away fans); Referee: Mark Halsey

15 January 2011 22	Manchester City	4–3	Wolverhampton Wanderers	Manchester
15:00 GMT	K. Touré 40'; Tevez 49', 66'; Y. Touré 54'	Report	Milijaš 12'; Doyle 68' (pen.); Zubar 86'	Stadium: City of Manchester Stadium; Attendance: 46,672 (2,800 away fans); Referee: Lee Mason

22 January 2011 23	Wolverhampton Wanderers	0–3	Liverpool	Wolverhampton
12:45 GMT		Report	Torres 36', 90+1'; Meireles 50'	Stadium: Molineux; Attendance: 28,869 (2,598 away fans); Referee: Martin Atkinson

2 February 2011 24	Bolton Wanderers	1–0	Wolverhampton Wanderers	Bolton
20:00 GMT	Sturridge 90+2'	Report		Stadium: Reebok Stadium; Attendance: 18,944 (1,902 away fans); Referee: Peter Walton

5 February 2011 25	Wolverhampton Wanderers	2–1	Manchester United	Wolverhampton
17:30 GMT	Elokobi 10'; Doyle 40'	Report	Nani 3'	Stadium: Molineux; Attendance: 28,811 (2,600 away fans); Referee: Michael Oliver

12 February 2011 26	Arsenal	2–0	Wolverhampton Wanderers	London
15:00 GMT	van Persie 16', 56'	Report		Stadium: Emirates Stadium; Attendance: 60,050 (2,000 away fans); Referee: Chris Foy

20 February 2011 27	West Bromwich Albion	1–1	Wolverhampton Wanderers	West Bromwich
12:00 GMT	Vela 90+2'	Report	O'Hara 39'	Stadium: The Hawthorns; Attendance: 26,170 (2,700 away fans); Referee: Mike Dean

26 February 2011 28	Wolverhampton Wanderers	4–0	Blackpool	Wolverhampton
15:00 GMT	Jarvis 2'; O'Hara 54'; Ebanks-Blake 78', 90'	Report		Stadium: Molineux; Attendance: 29,086 (1,488 away fans); Referee: Neil Swarbrick

6 March 2011 29	Wolverhampton Wanderers	3–3	Tottenham Hotspur	Wolverhampton
16:00 GMT	Doyle 20', 40' (pen.); Fletcher 87'	Report	Defoe 30', 35'; Pavlyuchenko 48'	Stadium: Molineux; Attendance: 28,669 (2,576 away fans); Referee: Mark Halsey

19 March 2011 30	Aston Villa	0–1	Wolverhampton Wanderers	Birmingham
15:00 GMT		Report	Jarvis 38'	Stadium: Villa Park; Attendance: 38,965 (2,720 away fans); Referee: Phil Dowd

2 April 2011 31	Newcastle United	4–1	Wolverhampton Wanderers	Newcastle upon Tyne
15:00 BST	Nolan 22'; Ameobi 45'; Løvenkrands 50'; Gutiérrez 90+3'	Report	Ebanks-Blake 58'	Stadium: St James' Park; Attendance: 49,939 (2,750 away fans); Referee: Mike Dean

9 April 2011 32	Wolverhampton Wanderers	0–3	Everton	Wolverhampton
12:45 BST		Report	Beckford 21'; Neville 39'; Bilyaletdinov 45'	Stadium: Molineux; Attendance: 28,352 (1,926 away fans); Referee: Phil Dowd

23 April 2011 33	Wolverhampton Wanderers	1–1	Fulham	Wolverhampton
15:00 BST	Fletcher 22'	Report	Johnson 80'	Stadium: Molineux; Attendance: 28,825 (1,494 away fans); Referee: Michael Oliver

26 April 2011 34	Stoke City	3–0	Wolverhampton Wanderers	Stoke-on-Trent
19:45 BST	Jones 16'; Shawcross 45+1'; Pennant 51'	Report		Stadium: Britannia Stadium; Attendance: 27,030 (2,474 away fans); Referee: Lee Mason

1 May 2011 35	Birmingham City	1–1	Wolverhampton Wanderers	Birmingham
12:00 BST	Larsson 27'	Report	Fletcher 7' (pen.)	Stadium: St Andrew's; Attendance: 26,072 (2,492 away fans); Referee: Kevin Friend

8 May 2011 36	Wolverhampton Wanderers	3–1	West Bromwich Albion	Wolverhampton
12:00 BST	Fletcher 15', 47'; Guedioura 28'	Report	Odemwingie 55' (pen.)	Stadium: Molineux; Attendance: 28,510 (2,541 away fans); Referee: Mike Dean

14 May 2011 37	Sunderland	1–3	Wolverhampton Wanderers	Sunderland
12:45 BST	Sessègnon 34'	Report	Craddock 22'; Fletcher 54'; Elokobi 78'	Stadium: Stadium of Light; Attendance: 41,273 (1,911 away fans); Referee: Mike Jones

22 May 2011 38	Wolverhampton Wanderers	2–3	Blackburn Rovers	Wolverhampton
16:00 BST	O'Hara 73'; Hunt 87'	Report	Roberts 22'; Emerton 38'; Hoilett 45+1'	Stadium: Molineux; Attendance: 29,009 (2,599 away fans); Referee: Howard Webb

Final table

Pos	Team	Pld	W	D	L	GF	GA	GD	Pts
16	Wigan Athletic	38	9	15	14	40	61	–21	42
17	Wolverhampton Wanderers	38	11	7	20	46	66	–20	40
18	Birmingham City	38	8	15	15	37	58	–21	39
19	Blackpool	38	10	9	19	55	78	–23	39
20	West Ham United	38	7	12	19	43	70	–27	33

Results summary

Overall								Home						Away					
Pld	W	D	L	GF	GA	GD	Pts	W	D	L	GF	GA	GD	W	D	L	GF	GA	GD
38	11	7	20	46	66	−20	40	8	4	7	30	30	0	3	3	13	16	36	−20

Source: Statto.com

Results by round

Round	1	2	3	4	5	6	7	8	9	10	11	12	13	14	15	16	17	18	19	20	21	22	23	24	25	26	27	28	29	30	31	32	33	34	35	36	37	38
Result	W	D	D	L	L	L	L	D	L	W	L	L	L	L	W	L	W	L	W	L	W	L	L	L	W	L	D	W	D	W	L	L	D	L	D	W	W	L
Position	4	5	4	9	15	17	19	19	19	19	19	19	19	19	19	20	19	20	19	20	17	18	19	20	20	20	20	17	19	18	19	19	19	19	19	17	16	17

Source: Statto.com
W = Win; D = Draw; L = Loss

=== FA Cup ===
8 January 2011 R3	Doncaster Rovers	2–2	Wolverhampton Wanderers	Doncaster
15:00 BST	Sharp 41'; Hayter 43'	Report	Milijaš 38'; Hunt 58' (pen.)	Stadium: Keepmoat Stadium; Attendance: 8,616 (1,856 away fans); Referee: Anthony Taylor

18 January 2011 R3 rep.	Wolverhampton Wanderers	5–0	Doncaster Rovers	Wolverhampton
19:45 GMT	Fletcher 5'; Mujangi Bia 61'; Doyle 66'; Jarvis 74'; Jones 90+3'	Report		Stadium: Molineux; Attendance: 10,031 (643 away fans); Referee: Kevin Friend

30 January 2011 R4	Wolverhampton Wanderers	0–1	Stoke City	Wolverhampton
13:00 GMT	Milijaš (penalty missed) 90+2'	Report	Huth 81'	Stadium: Molineux; Attendance: 11,967 (2,148 away fans); Referee: Mike Jones

=== League Cup ===
24 August 2010 R2	Wolverhampton Wanderers	2–1 (a.e.t.)	Southend United	Wolverhampton
19:45 BST	Milijaš 27' (pen.); Stearman 120+3'	Report	Easton 80'	Stadium: Molineux; Attendance: 10,284 (282 away fans); Referee: Colin Webster

21 September 2010 R3	Wolverhampton Wanderers	4–2 (a.e.t.)	Notts County	Wolverhampton
19:45 BST	Milijaš 83' (pen.); Fletcher 92'; Doyle 105+2', 119'	Report	Hughes 57'; Smith 114'	Stadium: Molineux; Attendance: 11,516 (704 away fans); Referee: James Linington

26 October 2010 R4	Manchester United	3–2	Wolverhampton Wanderers	Manchester
20:00 BST	Bébé 56'; Park 70'; Hernández 90'	Report	Elokobi 60'; Foley 76'	Stadium: Old Trafford; Attendance: 46,083 (909 away fans); Referee: Lee Mason

== Players ==
New squad rules operated in the Premier League for the season. Squads were capped at 25 senior players (those aged 21 and above at the beginning of 2010), and all squads had to include a minimum of 8 "homegrown" players. Wolves squads included 14, then 15, such players.

=== Statistics ===
Key:
‡ On loan from another club * First appearance(s) for the club

- # = Squad number
- Pos = Playing position
- P = Number of games played
- G = Number of goals scored
- GK = Goalkeeper
- DF = Defender
- MF = Midfielder
- FW = Forward
- = Yellow cards
- = Red cards
- † Permanent player left club during the season
- ¤ Loaned to another club for part or all of season

Correct as of end of season. Starting appearances are listed first, followed by substitute appearances in parentheses where applicable.

No.	Pos	Name	P	G	P	G	P	G	P	G	A yellow card	A red card	Notes
No.	Pos	Name	League		FA Cup		League Cup		Total		Discipline		Notes
1	GK	(United States) Marcus Hahnemann	14	0	3	0	0	0	17	0	1	0	
2	DF	(Belgium) Jelle Van Damme †	4(2)	1	0	0	0	0	4(2)	1	2	0	
3	DF	(Cameroon) George Elokobi	23(4)	2	2	0	3	1	28(4)	3	5	1	
4	MF	(Wales) David Edwards	12(3)	1	1(1)	0	1	0	15(4)	1	1	0	
5	DF	(England) Richard Stearman	27(4)	0	3	0	2	1	31(4)	1	6	0	
6	DF	(England) Jody Craddock	14(1)	1	1	0	0	0	15(1)	1	5	0	
7	MF	(England) Michael Kightly	1(3)	0	0	0	0	0	1(3)	0	1	0	(Note: Kightly was omitted from the squad list submitted after the Summer transfer window due to continuing injury problems.)
8	MF	(England) Karl Henry (c)	28(1)	0	2	0	0	0	30(1)	0	8	1	
9	FW	(England) Sylvan Ebanks-Blake	9(19)	7	0(1)	0	2(1)	0	11(21)	7	0	0	
10	FW	(Scotland) Steven Fletcher	16(12)	10	3	1	1(1)	1	20(13)	12	1	0	
11	DF	(Republic of Ireland) Stephen Ward	27(6)	1	2(1)	0	0	0	29(7)	1	2	0	
12	MF	(Republic of Ireland) Stephen Hunt	14(7)	3	3	1	1	0	18(7)	4	5	0	
13	GK	(Wales) Wayne Hennessey	24	0	0	0	3	0	27	0	0	0	
14	MF	(England) David Jones	11(1)	1	1(1)	1	1	0	13(2)	2	1	0	
15	MF	(England) Greg Halford ¤	0(1)	0	0	0	2	0	2(1)	0	1	0	
16	DF	(Scotland) Christophe Berra	31(1)	0	2	0	2	0	35(1)	0	6	1	
17	MF	(England) Matt Jarvis	35(2)	4	2(1)	1	1	0	38(3)	5	2	0	
18	FW	(Wales) Sam Vokes ¤	0(2)	0	0(2)	0	0	0	0(4)	0	0	0	
19	FW	(Republic of Ireland) Andy Keogh ¤	0(1)	0	0	0	0	0	0(1)	0	0	0	
19	FW	(England) Marcus Bent ‡	0(3)	0	0	0	1(1)	0	1(4)	0	0	0	
19	MF	(England) Adam Hammill	7(3)	0	0	0	0	0	7(3)	0	0	0	
20	MF	(Serbia) Nenad Milijaš	20(3)	2	2	1	2	2	24(3)	5	2	0	
21	DF	(England) Michael Mancienne ‡	13(3)	0	0	0	1	0	14(3)	0	1	0	
22	DF	(France) Steven Mouyokolo	2(2)	0	1	0	2	0	5(2)	0	0	0	
23	DF	(Guadeloupe) Ronald Zubar	14(1)	1	2	0	1	0	17(1)	1	5	0	
24	MF	(England) Jamie O'Hara ‡	13(1)	3	0	0	0	0	13(1)	3	3	0	
25	MF	(Belgium) Geoffrey Mujangi Bia ‡	0(1)	0	1	1	0(1)	0	1(2)	1	0	0	
26	DF	(England) Matt Hill ¤ †	0	0	0	0	0	0	0	0	0	0	(Note: Hill was omitted from the squad list submitted after the Summer transfer window.)
26	GK	(Brazil) Adriano Basso	0	0	0	0	0	0	0	0	0	0	
28	FW	(Scotland) Leigh Griffiths	0	0	0	0	0	0	0	0	0	0	
29	FW	(Republic of Ireland) Kevin Doyle	24(1)	5	1(1)	1	0(3)	2	25(5)	8	1	0	
30	GK	(Nigeria) Carl Ikeme ¤	0	0	0	0	0	0	0	0	0	0	(Note: Ikeme was omitted from the squad list submitted after the January transfer window after undergoing shoulder surgery.)
31	GK	(England) Matt Murray †	0	0	0	0	0	0	0	0	0	0	(Note: Murray announced his playing retirement due to multiple injury problems in August 2010.)
32	DF	(Republic of Ireland) Kevin Foley	29(3)	2	0	0	2(1)	1	31(4)	3	4	0	
33	FW	(Austria) Stefan Maierhofer ¤	0	0	0	0	0	0	0	0	0	0	
34	MF	(Algeria) Adlène Guedioura	4(6)	1	0	0	2	0	6(6)	1	3	0	
35	DF	(England) Ethan Ebanks-Landell	0	0	0	0	0	0	0	0	0	0	
36	DF	(Republic of Ireland) John Dunleavy ¤	0	0	0	0	0	0	0	0	0	0	
37	MF	(England) David Davis ¤	0	0	0	0	0	0	0	0	0	0	
38	FW	(England) Sam Winnall ¤	0	0	0	0	1	0	1	0	1	0	
39	DF	(England) Danny Batth ¤	0	0	0	0	1	0	1	0	0	0	
40	FW	(England) Ashley Hemmings ¤	0	0	0	0	1	0	1	0	0	0	
41	DF	(England) Scott Malone ¤	0	0	0	0	0	0	0	0	0	0	
42	FW	(England) James Spray	0	0	0	0	0	0	0	0	0	0	
43	MF	(England) Jamie Reckord ¤	0	0	0	0	0	0	0	0	0	0	
44	MF	(Republic of Ireland) Nathan Rooney	0	0	0	0	0	0	0	0	0	0	
45	GK	(Republic of Ireland) Aaron McCarey ¤	0	0	0	0	0	0	0	0	0	0	
46	DF	(Republic of Ireland) Matt Doherty	0	0	1	0	0	0	1	0	0	0	

=== Awards ===
Award	Winner
Fans' Player of the Season	Matt Jarvis
Players' Player of the Season	Matt Jarvis
Young Player of the Season	Matt Doherty
Academy Player of the Season	Johnny Gorman
Goal of the Season	Jamie O'Hara (vs West Bromwich Albion, 20 February 2011)

== Transfers ==
=== In ===
Date	Player	From	Fee
10 May 2010	(Algeria) Adlène Guedioura	(Belgium) Charleroi	Undisclosed
June 2010	(England) Dominic Iorfa	Southend United	Free
June 2010	(Republic of Ireland) Jordan Keane	Derby County	Free
June 2010	(Slovakia) Kristián Koštrna	(Slovakia) Spartak Trnava	Free
1 June 2010	(Belgium) Jelle Van Damme	(Belgium) Anderlecht	£2.5 million
3 June 2010	(Scotland) Steven Fletcher	Burnley	£6.5 million
18 June 2010	(France) Steven Mouyokolo	Hull City	Undisclosed
21 June 2010	(Republic of Ireland) Stephen Hunt	Hull City	£3,000,000
22 August 2010	(Republic of Ireland) Matt Doherty	(Republic of Ireland) Bohemians	£75,000
1 January 2011	(England) Michael Ihiekwe	Liverpool	Free
20 January 2011	(England) Adam Hammill	Barnsley	Undisclosed
27 January 2011	(Scotland) Leigh Griffiths	(Scotland) Dundee	Undisclosed
31 January 2011	(Brazil) Adriano Basso	Unattached	Free

=== Out ===
Date	Player	To	Fee
12 May 2010	(England) Jason Shackell	Barnsley	Undisclosed
25 May 2010	(England) Mark Little	Peterborough United	Free
1 June 2010	(Scotland) Chris Iwelumo	Burnley	Undisclosed
11 June 2010	(England) Daniel Jones	Sheffield Wednesday	Free
14 June 2010	(England) George Friend	Doncaster Rovers	Free
22 June 2010	(England) Andrew Surman	Norwich City	Undisclosed
1 July 2010	(England) Kyle Bennett	Bury	Released
1 July 2010	(Democratic Republic of the Congo) Aristote Guerin-Lokonga	Jarrow Roofing	Released
1 July 2010	(England) Paul McCone	Stourbridge	Released
1 August 2010	(England) Jack Metcalf	(United States) Clemson Tigers	Released
26 August 2010	(England) Matt Murray	Retired	–
1 January 2011	(Belgium) Jelle Van Damme	(Belgium) Standard Liège	£2.5 million
24 January 2011	(England) Matt Hill	Released	Free

=== Loans in ===
Date	Player	From	End date
11 May 2010	(Belgium) Geoffrey Mujangi Bia	(Belgium) Charleroi	End of season
26 August 2010	(England) Michael Mancienne	Chelsea	End of season
31 August 2010	(England) Marcus Bent	Birmingham City	4 January 2011
30 January 2011	(England) Jamie O'Hara	Tottenham	End of season

=== Loans out ===
Date	Player	To	End date
1 July 2010	(England) Nathaniel Mendez-Laing	Peterborough United	End of season
3 August 2010	(Austria) Stefan Maierhofer	(Germany) MSV Duisburg	End of season
5 August 2010	(Wales) Sam Vokes	Bristol City	5 January 2011
25 August 2010	(Republic of Ireland) Andy Keogh	(Wales) Cardiff City	31 January 2011
26 August 2010	(Nigeria) Carl Ikeme	Leicester City	25 November 2010
9 September 2010	(England) David Davis	Walsall	21 October 2010
19 October 2010	(England) Greg Halford	Portsmouth	3 January 2011
20 October 2010	(England) Matt Hill	Barnsley	16 November 2010
22 October 2010	(England) Scott Malone	Burton Albion	End of season
22 October 2010	(England) Ashley Hemmings	Torquay United	31 January 2011
25 November 2010	(England) Matt Hill	Barnsley	22 January 2011
25 November 2010	(England) Danny Batth	Sheffield United	29 December 2010
12 January 2011	(Republic of Ireland) John Dunleavy	Barnet	9 February 2011
13 January 2011	(England) Greg Halford	Portsmouth	End of season
31 January 2011	(Republic of Ireland) Andy Keogh	Bristol City	14 April 2011
31 January 2011	(England) David Davis	Shrewsbury Town	End of season
10 February 2011	(England) Sam Winnall	Burton Albion	End of season
15 February 2011	(Wales) Sam Vokes	Sheffield United	20 March 2011
16 February 2011	(Republic of Ireland) Aaron McCarey	Telford United	14 March 2011
7 March 2011	(England) Jamie Reckord	Northampton Town	End of season
16 March 2011	(England) Danny Batth	Sheffield Wednesday	End of season
24 March 2011	(Wales) Sam Vokes	Norwich City	22 April 2011

== Management and coaching staff ==
Position	Name
Manager	Mick McCarthy
Assistant manager	Terry Connor
First team fitness and conditioning coach	Tony Daley
Goalkeeping coach	Pat Mountain
Development coach, 18-21s	Steve Weaver
Academy manager	Kevin Thelwell
Assistant academy manager/under-18s coach	Mick Halsall
Club doctor	Dr Matthew Perry
Head of Medical Department	Steve Kemp
Club physio	Alan Peacham

== Kit ==
The season saw new home and away kits, both manufactured by new supplier BURRDA. The home kit featured the club's traditional gold and black colours while the away kit was all black with gold piping. Both shirts featured the internet gambling company Sportingbet.com as sponsor.
