= Luton Town Supporters' Trust =

- Formation: 2003
- Type: Football Supporters' Trust, industrial and provident society
- Headquarters: Bedford, Bedfordshire, England
- Chairman: Tony Murray
- Affiliations: Supporters Direct
- Volunteers: 7
- Website: Trust in Luton website

Luton Town Supporters' Trust is a registered industrial and provident society which acts as the supporters' trust, a democratic cooperative, for fans of the English football club Luton Town.

Trust in Luton was established in June 2003 by a group of supporters following the highly controversial takeover of Luton Town by John Gurney. Luton's current Managing Director, Gary Sweet, was a founding member and former director of the Trust, and was part of the movement that successfully forced Gurney out by deliberately placing the club into administrative receivership.

The Trust owns 50,000 shares in the club's holding company, Luton Town Football Club 2020 Limited, and currently holds the right of veto over any changes to the club's identity – the only such organisation that has this right in English professional football. The Trust is also a member of Supporters Direct, a government-led trust initiative.

== History ==
In May 2003, businessman John Gurney and his consortium bought Luton Town for just £4 from owner Mike Watson-Challis. One of Gurney's first acts was to sack Luton manager Joe Kinnear and his assistant, Mick Harford – both popular figures with Luton's supporters. Gurney outlined his vision to, among other things, build a Formula 1 track around a 70,000-capacity stadium, share the ground with NFL and NBA franchises, and to change the club's name to London-Luton Football Club to tie in with the local airport and make it more accessible to "customers" living outside of Luton. Gurney also raised the possibility of Luton merging with Wimbledon, a club located over 40 miles away, in order to secure a position in the league above. This proposed destruction of the club's history and culture led to a group of supporters establishing Trust in Luton to protect the future of Luton Town and provide a unified voice to protest against Gurney's involvement. The Trust successfully convinced many supporters and local sponsors to vote with their feet and refuse to buy season tickets or invest in the club for the 2003–04 campaign, with the money (totalling almost £300,000) instead pledged towards the Trust. The club was later revealed to be losing £500,000 a month and, by July 2003, the players and staff had not been paid for two months. Combined with The Football League withholding television and league sponsorship money due to the ongoing uncertainty, there was a very real threat that the club would be declared bankrupt within a matter of weeks.

The Trust devised a strategy and began to acquire shares in the club's major creditor, Hatters Holdings, an offshore company that was owed several million pounds by the club. Hatters Holdings, now majority-owned by a combination of Trust in Luton and prominent supporter spokesman Gary Sweet, deliberately placed the club into administrative receivership on 14 July 2003 to successfully force out John Gurney after a turbulent 55 days in charge.

As a shareholder in the club's major creditor, the Trust was part of the group of creditors who agreed to sell the club to a consortium headed by Bill Tomlins in December 2003, with the sale completed in May 2004. The Trust was provided with a place on Luton's board and initial success followed, as the club won promotion to the Championship under the new owners during the 2004–05 season. In June 2005, the Trust led calls for the cancellation of a planned friendly match between Luton and Milton Keynes Dons. The match was called off, with the "franchise" nature of MK Dons, which went against much of what the Trust stands for, cited as the primary reason for supporter disaffection.

In April 2007, Tomlins resigned his position as chairman following an investigation by the Football Association into irregular payments made by the club's parent company, Jayten Stadium Limited, and confirmed that illegal payments had been made to incoming players' agents. The Trust's board representative remained unaware of any illegal payments, leading to other board members at the club to apologise to Trust in Luton, stating that they had misled them as to the serious nature of the investigation and the club's financial situation. The Trust, having since sold its share in Hatters Holdings, was powerless to act as David Pinkney was confirmed as new chairman two days after Tomlins' resignation. Relegation to League One followed a week later. In October 2007, the Trust had its seat on the board withdrawn and, a few weeks later, the club was docked ten points after entering administration. The administrators ultimately sold the club in February 2008 to the fan-backed Luton Town Football Club 2020 consortium – headed up by former Trust in Luton director Gary Sweet. The consortium had agreed a deal with the Trust for them to buy, when in a position to, 50,000 shares to ensure the club would have a greater level of fan ownership and involvement. Luton were relegated to League Two at the end of the season and then, following a 30-point deduction for financial irregularities, to the Conference Premier during the 2008–09 season.

Trust in Luton formalised the ownership of its 50,000 shares in October 2012 during a meeting with the club's officials. The same meeting led the Trust to begin stepping up its involvement with the club, including an agreement to hold quarterly meetings with Luton directors and for the establishment of a scheme where shares could be sold to fans via the Trust. This also saw Trust in Luton start campaigning for answers from the footballing authorities for why other clubs, such as Watford, Queens Park Rangers and Portsmouth, had received lighter punishments than Luton (who had been docked 40 points in two seasons and had large fines imposed) for comparative financial misdemeanours.

In March 2014, it was confirmed that Trust in Luton had been given the legal right to veto any future changes to Luton's identity, no matter who owns the club, including its name, nickname, colours, club crest and mascot. This step to empower Luton fans led to the Trust's membership tripling in one day.

In November 2014, Trust in Luton merged with the long-established Luton Town Supporters' Club.

== Current board ==
As of 14 May 2015.

- Chairman: Tony Murray
- Secretary: Steve Townsend
- Treasurer: Les Miller
- Membership Secretary: Allan Kirk
- Board Members: Chris Lavey, Terry Hopper, Alisdair MacLean
- Luton Town Supporters Liaison Officer: John Miller

== President and patrons ==
As of 14 May 2015.

Like similar societies and organisations, Trust in Luton have a president and patrons:

President

- John Moore (former Luton manager who led the club to their highest-ever league finish, and later became the club's youth coach)

Patron

- Joan Bartholomew (widow of comedian Eric Morecambe, a prominent supporter of Luton Town and former president of the club)
