= Robert Beckwith =

Robert Beckwith may refer to:

- Bob Beckwith (1932–2024), firefighter who stood next to George W. Bush during speech at World Trade Center ruins
- Rob Beckwith (born 1984), English footballer
- Robert Todd Lincoln Beckwith (1904–1985), last surviving undisputed descendant of Abraham Lincoln
