= Steve Howard =

Footballer (born 1976)

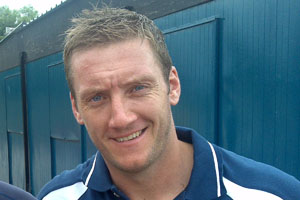
- Howard in 2009

Personal information
- Full name: Steven John Howard
- Date of birth: 10 May 1976 (age 50)
- Place of birth: Durham, England
- Height: 6 ft 3 in (1.91 m)
- Position: Striker

Youth career
- 1994–1995: Tow Law Town

Senior career*
| Years | Team | Apps | (Gls) |
| 1995–1999 | Hartlepool United | 145 | (26) |
| 1999–2001 | Northampton Town | 86 | (18) |
| 2001–2006 | Luton Town | 212 | (96) |
| 2006–2008 | Derby County | 63 | (17) |
| 2008 | → Leicester City (loan) | 1 | (0) |
| 2008–2012 | Leicester City | 146 | (28) |
| 2012–2013 | Hartlepool United | 42 | (3) |
| 2013 | → Sheffield Wednesday (loan) | 8 | (1) |
| Total | | 703 | (189) |

International career
| 2007 | Scotland B | 1 | (1) |
- * Club domestic league appearances and goals

Steven John Howard (born 10 May 1976) is a former professional footballer who played as a striker. Howard was usually cited as a typical target man and renowned for his aerial strength.

== Club career ==
=== Early career ===
Howard began his career at non-league Tow Law Town, whilst working as a roofer as his day-job. He worked 12-hour shifts and also dug up roads before moving to Hartlepool United in 1995. He moved on to Northampton Town as their record signing for £120,000 in February 1999.

=== Luton Town ===
Luton Town signed him for £50,000 on 22 March 2001 with another £25,000 due if Luton avoided relegation, which they failed to do.

Howard was almost sacked from Luton in late 2001 after an incident during an away game against York City. The Hatters had been awarded a penalty, and Howard grabbed the ball from the designated penalty taker and promptly missed. However, an infringement was noticed and the penalty was ordered to be re-taken. Against the protests of the senior players and the management team, Howard once again grabbed the ball and stepped up to take the penalty, missing once again. He was substituted immediately afterwards and he walked straight into the changing rooms. After reclaiming his place in the team, Howard went on to score 24 goals as Luton finished runners-up in the Division 3 and Howard won the Golden Boot for that Division.

The 2002–03 season saw Howard partnered by Tony Thorpe. Many pundits expected Thorpe to be the striker to hit 20+ goals that season, but it was Howard who again finished as the Hatters' top scorer, this time with 23. Howard was part of the squad of players that dug deep and stuck together as the awful mess of the 2003 take-over saga unravelled. During that season, Howard suffered from a hernia and missed a large chunk of the season, but again he finished as the Hatters' top scorer, this time with 16 goals.

In the summer of 2004 a transfer to Sheffield Wednesday for £500,000 appeared to be imminent after Wednesday announced that Luton had accepted a bid for him. Luton then came out and denied accepting a bid. After much confusion, Howard stayed at Luton and earned himself a League One winner's medal. With 18 goals, Howard played a crucial part in Luton's promotion season, earning himself a place in the League One PFA Team of the Year alongside five of his Luton teammates.

Howard signed a new deal in June 2005, despite interest from a host of clubs in Luton's new league. In his first season at Championship level, he managed to hit 15 goals in 45 appearances. This is more impressive because Howard played a large chunk of the season at centre-half following an injury crises. Howard scored more than 100 goals for Luton and is the third all time scorer. He wore the number 19 shirt at Luton, and Howard is regarded by Luton fans as a club legend, with over 100 goals in all competitions (96 in the league), five years of service, two promotions and a never-say-die attitude.

Howard's form attracted "derisory offers" from Leeds United, Cardiff City and Norwich City. On 22 July 2006, he signed a three-year contract with Derby County for £1 million. Then-manager of Luton Mike Newell said the club had no choice but to let Howard leave the club.

=== Derby County ===
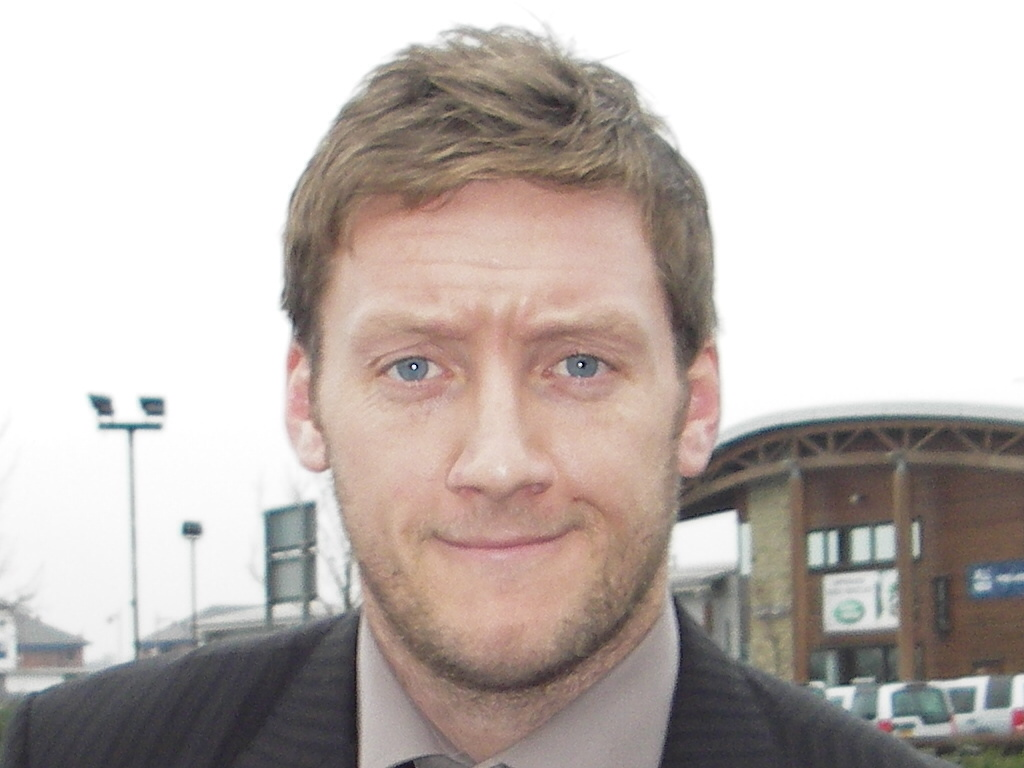
Howard in 2006 during his time at Derby County

Howard made his Derby County debut in a 2–2 draw with Southampton on the opening day of the 2006–07 season. His £1 million fee made him Derby's biggest signing for over 5 years and he initially struggled to repay it as he failed to score in his first seven appearances for the club. He finally broke his duck with the winner in a 1–0 victory against Wolves at Molineux and went on to score in four consecutive games, the first player to do so for the club since Fabrizio Ravanelli in 2001.

Howard quickly became a fans' favourite as his work rate and goals helped Derby to finish third in the 2006–07 Championship and eventually earn promotion to the Premier League for the first time in 5 years following a 1–0 win over West Bromwich Albion in the play-off final. He finished the season as Derby's top scorer with 19 goals, of which 16 came in the league and 3 in Cup competitions, two of which were vital goals in the Championship play-off semi-final first leg against Southampton at the St. Mary's Stadium, giving Derby a 2–1 lead prior to the second leg at Pride Park. Howard was also nominated for the January 2007 Championship player of the month award and was awarded the Jack Stamps Trophy as Derby's Player of the Season for 2006–07.

Howard, and Derby as a team, found life in the Premier League difficult and he managed only one goal in a 4–1 defeat to Manchester United at Old Trafford on 8 December 2007. He also missed a vital penalty in a 2–1 home defeat to Blackburn Rovers on 30 December 2007. It proved to be his last contribution for Derby County, and the club confirmed there was interest shown in Howard from other clubs in December.

=== Leicester City ===
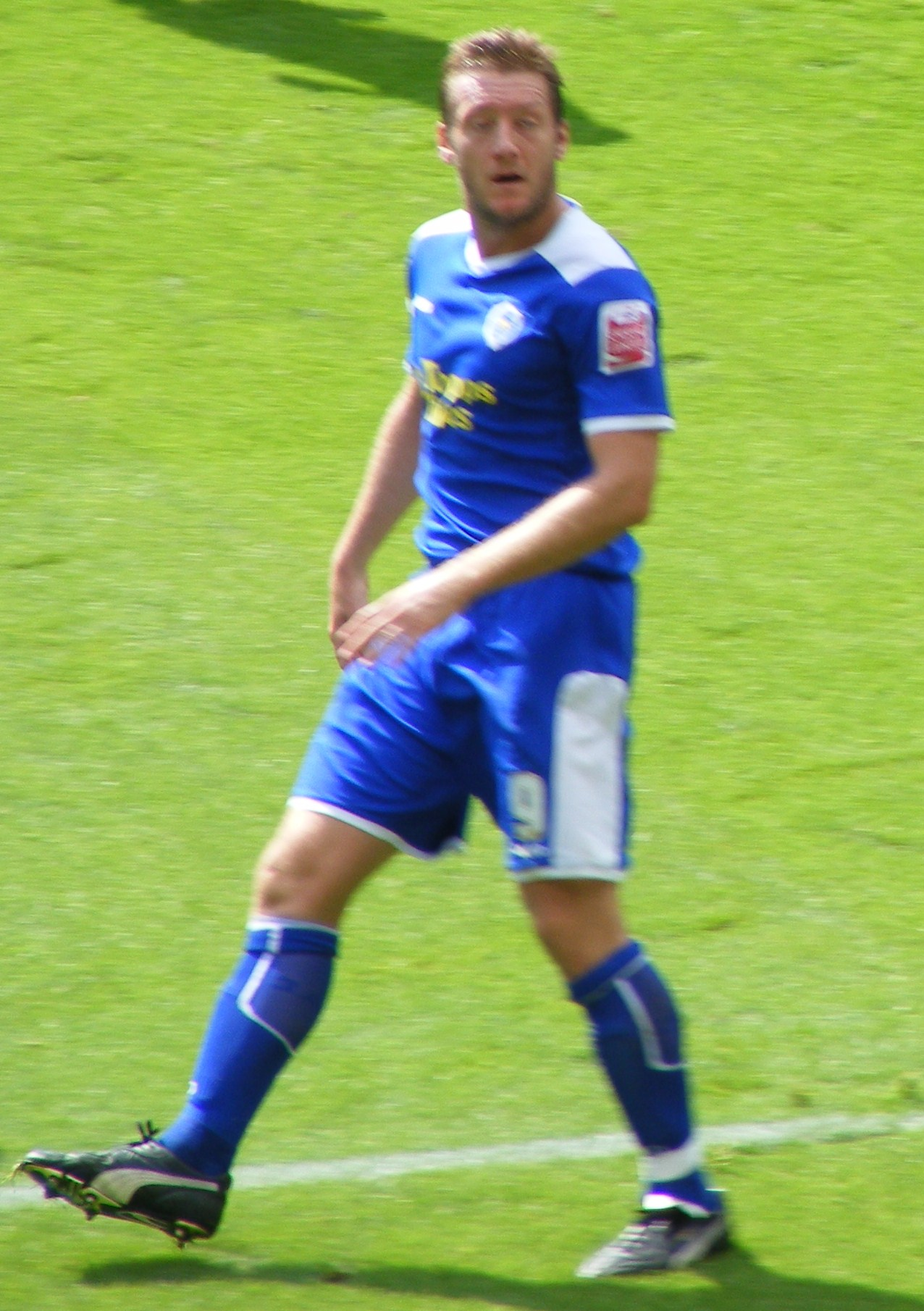
Steve Howard playing for Leicester City, 13 September 2008

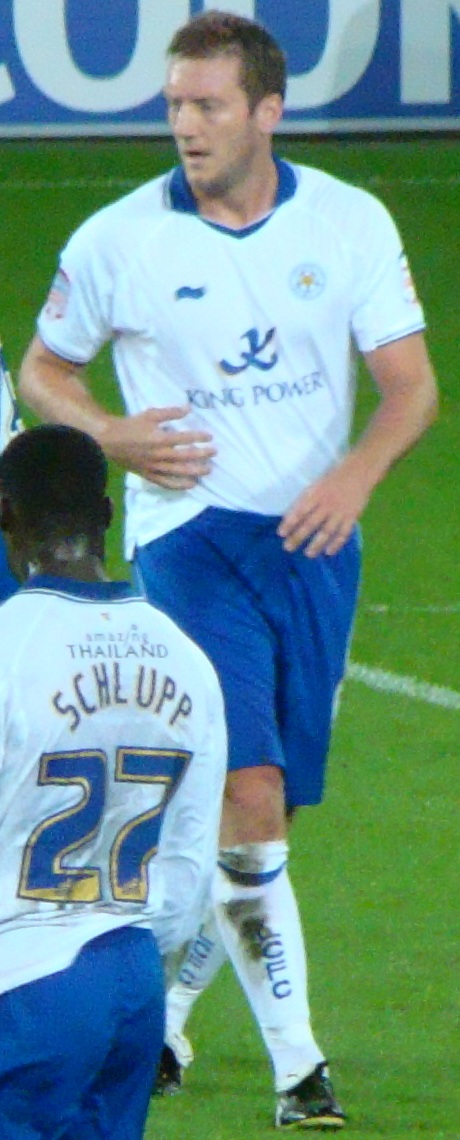
Howard in his fifth season with Leicester, 21 September 2011

Howard joined Leicester City on 1 January 2008 for a fee of £1.5 million, signing a three-and-a-half-year contract. Initially signing on loan, Derby teammate Matt Oakley joined him at the club on 11 January. He made his debut in a 3–1 defeat to QPR on 1 January 2008. He scored his first goal in an M69 derby on 12 January, in which Leicester won 2–0. Howard bagged a hat-trick in a 4–1 win over West Brom on 15 March, a result he said was coming and was confident the club could stay up. Despite regaining his form by scoring six goals however, Howard could not prevent Leicester from being relegated at the end of the season.

Desperate to win promotion back to the Championship, Howard was able to maintain his form the following season. Partnering teammate Matty Fryatt in attack, he scored 13 league goals and contributed numerous assists to help Leicester maintain their lead at the top of League One. He went on to help the club secure their promotion as champions, earning his second League One medal on 24 April. Howard was also voted Leicester City supporters club player of the season for the 2008–09 season. His overall performance earned him the club's player of the season award on 28 April 2009.

In April 2009, Howard believed Leicester could win promotion to the Premier League in the 2009–10 season. He failed to score his first goal until 12 December 2009, in a 3–0 win over Sheffield Wednesday. Howard scored a total of 5 league goals in 35 matches as Leicester qualified for the Championship play-offs. Despite eventually going on to lose to Cardiff City 4–3 on penalties in the play-off semi-final, Howard's performance in the second leg earned him great plaudits, being described in both The Times and The Scotsman as "unplayable".

Howard extended his contract with the club until June 2012 on 21 October 2010. He scored 4 league goals and played 35 games in the 2010–11 season, of which 19 were as a substitute. He was linked with a permanent move to Sheffield Wednesday in April 2011, but Leicester denied that they were selling him. In the 2011–12 season, Howard's position in the first team was limited as a result of Leicester buying new strikers. He made his 55th appearance off the bench in a 2–0 win over Coventry City on 3 March 2012. This made him the most-used substitute in the club's history, beating the previous record of 54 held by Trevor Benjamin.

=== Hartlepool United return ===
On 11 July 2012, Howard re-joined Hartlepool United as a free agent following his release from Leicester City His first goal back at the club came in a 2–1 defeat at home to Sheffield United on 2 October 2012. However, his first season back was not successful and Steve was booed off in his last game before being loaned out to Sheffield Wednesday while Hartlepool were relegated to League Two.

Howard's first game back from his loan spell at Sheffield Wednesday was in a pre-season friendly for Pools against Middlesbrough F.C. in which his substitution was greeted to boos due to comments he had made about the club in the press and on Twitter. Boss Colin Cooper stated that "He wants to repay the fans and although he knows that won't be easy, it's something he's determined to do" as he was handed the number nine shirt for the 2013–14 season.

Howard's contract was terminated by mutual agreement on 25 November after only managing 3 goals in a season and a half. His last game for Hartlepool saw him sent off after only being on the field for five minutes in a 3–1 home defeat to Oxford United.

=== Sheffield Wednesday ===
Howard was signed on loan on 28 March 2013 and was one of 3 emergency loan signings made by manager Dave Jones. Howard was brought in alongside Stuart Holden and Seyi Olofinjana. Some owls fans were speculative about the loan signing of the 36-year-old, who was brought in from – at the time – bottom of the League One Table, Hartlepool United who were on the verge of relegation. Howard made his first appearance for the Owls against Bristol City at Ashton Gate on 1 April 2013 in a 1–1 draw. During the game Howard flicked on a header to set Jermaine Johnson up for his fourth of the season. Howard only played 63 minutes before being substituted by striker, Gary Madine. Howard made his second appearance for the owls as substitute, in the 69th minute and replaced striker Leroy Lita. Howard started his third game for the Owls, partnered alongside Lita and was denied a first Wednesday goal from a close range shot saved by Millwall keeper David Forde, in a vital 1–2 victory over Millwall. Howard's first goal for the Owls came in the last game of the season from a Miguel Llera pass, Howard struck a top left finish in the 2–0 victory over Middlesbrough, to clinch safety from the hands of relegation.

== International career ==
Along with James Morrison and Gabriel Agbonlahor, Howard was one of a number of English-born players identified in June 2007 as being eligible to play for Scotland. In November 2007, he was named in the Scotland B squad for a match against Republic of Ireland B, scoring on his debut in a 1–1 draw.

== Personal life ==
Howard is a fan of Newcastle United and fulfilled a lifelong ambition of playing at St James' Park when he played in the Derby side which drew 2–2 on 23 December 2007.

== Career statistics ==
Appearances and goals by club, season and competition
| Club | Season | League | | | FA Cup | | League Cup | | Other | | Total | |
| Club | Season | Division | Apps | Goals | Apps | Goals | Apps | Goals | Apps | Goals | Apps | Goals |
|---|---|---|---|---|---|---|---|---|---|---|---|---|
| Hartlepool United | 1995–96 | Third Division | 43 | 7 | 1 | 0 | 3 | 0 | 2 (Note: Appearance(s) and goal(s) in Football League Trophy) | 2 | 49 | 9 |
| Hartlepool United | 1996–97 | Third Division | 31 | 7 | 1 | 0 | 1 | 0 | 0 | 0 | 33 | 7 |
| Hartlepool United | 1997–98 | Third Division | 43 | 7 | 1 | 0 | 2 | 1 | 2 (Note: Appearance(s) in Football League Trophy) | 0 | 48 | 8 |
| Hartlepool United | 1998–99 | Third Division | 28 | 5 | 2 | 2 | 2 | 0 | 2 | 1 | 34 | 8 |
| Hartlepool United | Total | | 145 | 26 | 5 | 2 | 8 | 1 | 6 | 3 | 164 | 32 |
| Northampton Town | 1998–99 | Second Division | 12 | 0 | – | | – | | – | | 12 | 0 |
| Northampton Town | 1999–2000 | Third Division | 41 | 10 | 1 | 0 | 2 | 0 | 1 | 0 | 45 | 10 |
| Northampton Town | 2000–01 | Second Division | 33 | 8 | 2 | 0 | 2 | 0 | 1 | 0 | 38 | 8 |
| Northampton Town | Total | | 86 | 18 | 3 | 0 | 4 | 0 | 2 | 0 | 95 | 18 |
| Luton Town | 2000–01 | Second Division | 12 | 3 | – | | – | | – | | 12 | 3 |
| Luton Town | 2001–02 | Third Division | 42 | 24 | 0 | 0 | 1 | 0 | 0 | 0 | 43 | 24 |
| Luton Town | 2002–03 | Second Division | 41 | 22 | 1 | 0 | 2 | 1 | 0 | 0 | 44 | 23 |
| Luton Town | 2003–04 | Second Division | 34 | 15 | 3 | 0 | 2 | 1 | 1 | 0 | 40 | 16 |
| Luton Town | 2004–05 | League One | 40 | 18 | 3 | 4 | 1 | 0 | 0 | 0 | 44 | 22 |
| Luton Town | 2005–06 | Championship | 43 | 14 | 1 | 1 | 1 | 0 | – | | 45 | 15 |
| Luton Town | Total | | 212 | 96 | 8 | 5 | 7 | 2 | 1 | 0 | 228 | 103 |
| Derby County | 2006–07 | Championship | 43 | 16 | 3 | 0 | 2 | 1 | 3 (Note: Appearance(s) and goal(s) in Football League Championship play-offs) | 2 | 51 | 19 |
| Derby County | 2007–08 | Premier League | 20 | 1 | – | | 1 | 0 | – | | 21 | 1 |
| Derby County | Total | | 63 | 17 | 3 | 0 | 3 | 1 | 3 | 2 | 72 | 20 |
| Leicester City | 2007–08 | Championship | 21 | 6 | 1 | 0 | – | | – | | 22 | 6 |
| Leicester City | 2008–09 | League One | 41 | 13 | 4 | 0 | 2 | 1 | 3 | 1 | 50 | 15 |
| Leicester City | 2009–10 | Championship | 36 | 5 | 1 | 0 | 1 | 0 | 1 (Note: Appearance in Football League Championship play-offs) | 0 | 39 | 5 |
| Leicester City | 2010–11 | Championship | 29 | 4 | 2 | 0 | 4 | 1 | – | | 35 | 5 |
| Leicester City | 2011–12 | Championship | 20 | 0 | 2 | 0 | 1 | 1 | – | | 23 | 1 |
| Leicester City | Total | | 147 | 28 | 10 | 0 | 8 | 3 | 4 | 1 | 169 | 32 |
| Hartlepool United | 2012–13 | League One | 34 | 3 | 1 | 0 | 1 | 0 | 0 | 0 | 36 | 3 |
| Hartlepool United | 2013–14 | League Two | 8 | 0 | 0 | 0 | 1 | 0 | 0 | 0 | 9 | 0 |
| Hartlepool United | Total | | 42 | 3 | 1 | 0 | 2 | 0 | 0 | 0 | 45 | 3 |
| Sheffield Wednesday (loan) | 2012–13 | Championship | 8 | 1 | – | | – | | – | | 8 | 1 |
| Career total | | | 703 | 189 | 30 | 7 | 32 | 7 | 16 | 6 | 781 | 209 |

== Honours ==
Luton Town

- Football League One: 2004–05

Derby County

- Football League Championship play-offs: 2007

Leicester City

- Football League One: 2008–09

Individual

- PFA Team of the Year: 2004–05 League One
- Football League One Player of the Month: August 2004
