= Matthew Judge =

Irish footballer (born 1985)

Personal information
- Date of birth: 18 January 1985 (age 41)
- Place of birth: London, England
- Position: Striker

Team information
- Current team: Thurrock

Senior career*
Years	Team	Apps	(Gls)
2001–2004	Luton Town	2	(1)
2004–2005	Dagenham & Redbridge	0	(0)
2006–2008	Sligo Rovers	53	(12)
2009–2009	Ebbsfleet United	1	(0)
2009–2011	Thurrock	1	(1)
2011–	Dunstable Town	29	(15)
- * Club domestic league appearances and goals

Matthew Judge (born 18 January 1985) is an Irish footballer who plays for Thurrock in the Conference South as a striker.

Judge was with Tottenham Hotpsur for five seasons before joining Luton Town. He scored his only senior goal for Luton in a Football League Trophy game against Stevenage Borough.

In 2004, Judge was told that he would not be offered a professional deal and duly departed from Kenilworth Road in a season that had seen him earn his first cap for the Republic of Ireland U-19 side.

After an unsuccessful trial with Southend United, Judge signed for Dagenham & Redbridge. Unable to break into the first-team on a regular basis at Dagenham, he was released and after spells with Heybridge Swifts and Harlow Town, he signed for Sligo Rovers during the summer of 2006.

He is an Irish former U-19 International and has also been called into the Irish U-21 squad. During December 2008, he was released from Sligo Rovers before signing for Ebbsfleet United in January 2009. He was released by Ebbsfleet and joined Thurrock in October 2009.

Matthew Judge signed for Dunstable Town at the start of the 2011/12 season. As of 2025, he has a job in Loxford School of Science and Technology in Redbridge
