= Morten Hyldgaard =

Danish footballer (born 1978)

Personal information
- Full name: Morten Lauridsen Hyldgaard
- Date of birth: 26 January 1978 (age 48)
- Place of birth: Herning, Denmark
- Height: 1.98 m (6 ft 6 in)
- Position: Goalkeeper

Youth career
- Brande IF
- Ikast FS

Senior career*
Years	Team	Apps	(Gls)
1997–1998	Ikast FS	8	(0)
1999–2003	Coventry City	27	(0)
1999	→ Scunthorpe United (loan)	5	(0)
2001	→ Grimsby Town (loan)	0	(0)
2003–2004	Hibernian	0	(0)
2004	Luton Town	18	(0)
2005	Esbjerg fB	0	(0)
2006–2009	AGF	6	(0)
Total		64	(0)

International career
1996–1997	Denmark U-19	4	(0)
1998–1999	Denmark U-21	3	(0)

Managerial career
- 2010–2012: FC Midtjylland (goalkeeping coach)
- 2012–: Skive IK (goalkeeping coach)
- * Club domestic league appearances and goals

Morten Lauridsen Hyldgaard (born 26 January 1978) is a Danish former professional footballer who played as goalkeeper. He played for a number of clubs in English football. He played four games for the Denmark national under-21 football team.

== Career ==
He started his career with Ikast FS. He played for a while in England, signing with Coventry City in 1999, but he found first team chances rare and spent time on loan with Scunthorpe United and later Grimsby Town. He then had a spell in Scotland with Hibernian before returning to England with Luton Town.

He decided to end his career in 2004, but made a comeback with Danish club Esbjerg fB under manager Ove Pedersen. In 2006, he joined Pedersen at AGF, where he ended his career in 2009.
