= Kevin Foley (footballer, born 1984) =

Irish footballer and coach (born 1984)

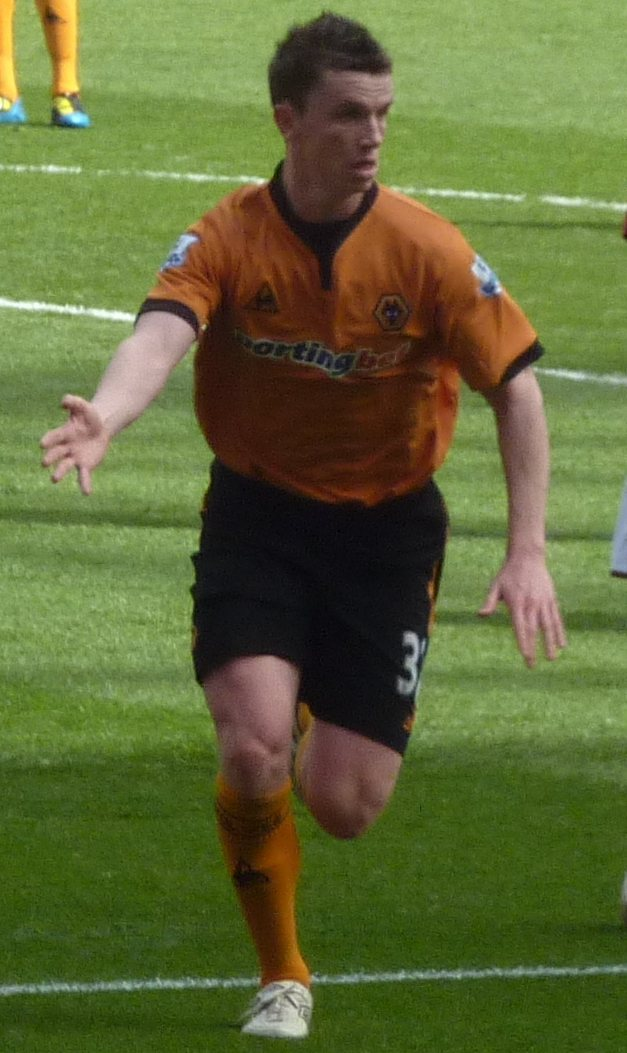
- Foley playing for Wolverhampton Wanderers in 2010

Personal information
- Full name: Kevin Patrick Foley
- Date of birth: 1 November 1984 (age 42)
- Place of birth: London, England
- Height: 5 ft 11 in (1.80 m)
- Positions: Defender; midfielder

Team information
- Current team: Luton Town (first-team coach)

Youth career
- 1995–2002: Luton Town

Senior career*
Years	Team	Apps	(Gls)
2002–2007	Luton Town	151	(3)
2007–2015	Wolverhampton Wanderers	194	(5)
2014	→ Blackpool (loan)	5	(0)
2014–2015	→ Blackpool (loan)	4	(0)
2015	Copenhagen	4	(0)
2016	Ipswich Town	8	(0)
2016–2017	Charlton Athletic	15	(0)
2017	Coventry City	12	(0)
2017–2018	Billericay Town	15	(0)
Total		408	(8)

International career
2004–2006	Republic of Ireland U21	8	(1)
2006	Republic of Ireland B	1	(0)
2009–2012	Republic of Ireland	8	(0)
- * Club domestic league appearances and goals

Kevin Patrick Foley (born 1 November 1984) is a professional football coach and former player who is a first-team coach at EFL League One club Luton Town.

Foley, a right back also able to operate in midfield, previously spent twelve years at Luton Town before joining Wolverhampton Wanderers, where he played for seven and a half years. He was part of the Wolves squad which won promotion to the Premier League in 2009.

== Club career ==
=== Luton Town ===
Born in Luton, to Irish parents, Foley joined hometown club Luton Town at the age of nine. He progressed through the youth ranks, winning the Luton Town Young Player of the Season award at the age of seventeen, before signing professional terms with the club at the age of eighteen. He finally broke into the first-team squad in 2002–03, making his league debut on 19 April 2003, in a 2–2 draw with Bristol City. Foley was again named Young Player of the Season for the second consecutive season. The following season, he established himself as first choice right-back at the club and was again named Young Player of the Season for the third consecutive year. Foley won promotion with Luton to the Championship in 2005, and spent two seasons at this level before the club dropped back into League One in 2007. He made a total of 151 appearances for Luton, scoring three times.

=== Wolverhampton Wanderers ===
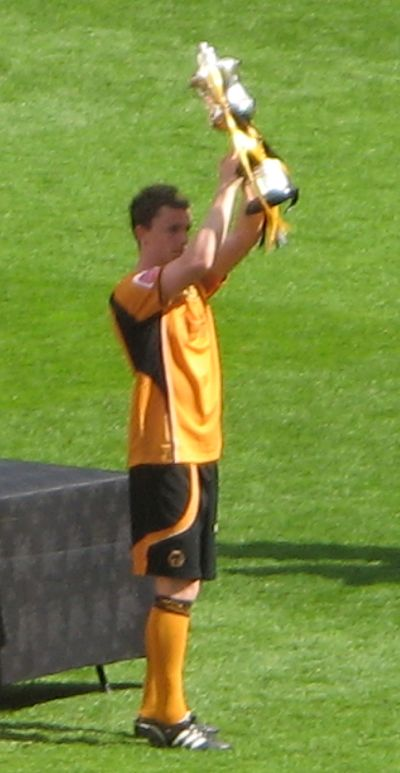
Foley won Wolves' Player of the Season Award in 2009.

On 14 August 2007, Foley joined Championship club Wolverhampton Wanderers on a three-year contract for an undisclosed fee, before making his club debut the following day in a League Cup tie against Bradford. He scored his first league goal for the club on 22 September 2007 against Norwich City at Molineux. He ended his first season for Wolves as a regular member of their starting XI, featuring in a total of 49 games, scoring one goal.

The 2008–09 season saw him part of the Wolves team that won the Championship, and so returned to the Premier League. He made a total of 47 appearances, scoring one goal. His performances won him Wolves' Player of the Season Award, voted by the club's fans, as well as a new four-year contract with the club that would keep him at Wolves until at least summer 2013.

Foley made his Premier League debut in the team's opening fixture against West Ham on 15 August 2009. During the 0–2 defeat though he sustained a medial knee ligament injury that kept him out for four months, meaning it was not until December 2009 that he got a sustained run in the team. When he did play it was mostly at right-midfield and central-midfield in a 4–5–1 formation, with players such as Ronald Zubar and Richard Stearman by now favoured in Foley's preferred right-back position.

During the 2010–11 season, Foley scored his only Premier League goals, when he netted in consecutive home games, against Bolton then Sunderland, respectively. He made a career-best of 33 top flight appearances, scoring two goals during the campaign as the team narrowly avoided relegation. At the conclusion of the season he signed another contract extension, due to run until summer 2015.

He began the following season but soon had to undergo surgery to treat a long-running ankle problem. Having returned to fitness in January 2012, he was part of the Wolves squad that suffered relegation under Terry Connor.

After a second successive relegation, Foley was rarely used as new manager Kenny Jackett sought to rebuild a new team. In February 2014, Foley agreed a one-month loan with Championship club Blackpool, for whom he made five appearances but was not offered the chance to remain until the end of the season. In November 2014, having not featured for Wolves in the meantime, Foley was again loaned out to Blackpool in a deal that ran until January 2015.

On 12 January 2015, the remainder of Foley's contract with Wolves was cancelled by mutual agreement. In total he made 213 appearances for the club, scoring six goals.

=== Copenhagen ===
On 12 January 2015, within hours of confirmation that he had left Wolves, Foley signed a six-months contract with the Danish club F.C. Copenhagen, where he reunited with his former Wolves manager Ståle Solbakken.

In November 2015, after a two-week trial with Shrewsbury Town, Foley began training with Reading with the view to a short-term contract. Foley left Reading without earning a contract.

=== Ipswich Town ===
After starting a game for Ipswich Town's U21s in January 2016, Ipswich manager Mick McCarthy recalled Foley impressing him for the Hatters against his Wolves team: "He played against us for Luton at Wolves and at the time had some good wide players, Matt Jarvis and Michael Kightly, and he saw them all off. I signed him on the back of that and he was different class for me. He's a great bloke, he'd fit in fabulously with the lads, if he's all right, if he's fully fit, but he looks it. He's trained with us and he looks the part at the moment, so hopefully he'll get through the game today. He was out playing in Denmark [with FC Copenhagen], he hurt his shoulder and he had to have an operation in the summer. That doesn't bother me too much. If it was his legs it might be bothering me, but it was his shoulder. He's a gentleman, he's a lovely fella, he'd fit in perfectly with the rest of the lads. I hope he proves that he's worth it."

On 22 January 2016, Foley signed for Championship club Ipswich Town on a contract until the end of the 2015–16 season, following the departure of full-back Jonathan Parr.

=== Charlton Athletic and Coventry City ===
On 5 August 2016, Foley signed for Charlton Athletic on a five-month contract. He made his debut on the opening day of 2016–17 in a 2–0 defeat away to Bury. Foley made 20 appearances for Charlton and was released following the expiration of his contract. A day later, he signed for League One club Coventry City on a contract until the end of 2016–17, with a view to a one-year extension. He made his debut in a 1–0 defeat away to Chesterfield on 14 January. Foley was cup-tied for Coventry's win in the 2017 EFL Trophy Final. Foley finished the season with 12 appearances for Coventry, and was one of nine players released when his contract expired at the end of 2016–17.

=== Billericay Town ===
On 2 August 2017, Foley signed for Isthmian League Premier Division club Billericay Town. He made his debut 10 days later, starting in Billericay's 1–0 home defeat to Kingstonian on the opening day of 2017–18. Foley started as Billericay beat Chelmsford City 2–1 in the Essex Senior Cup final on 20 March 2018. He was restricted to 21 appearances due to injury, with 15 of those appearances coming in the league, as Billericay won the Isthmian League Premier Division title and promotion to the National League South. He was released by Billericay at the end of the season.

== International career ==
Born and raised in England, Foley qualified to play for Ireland as his parents are from County Kerry. He made his debut for Republic of Ireland's under-21 team in May 2004 against Scotland. In 2005, he was named as the FAI Under-21 Player of the Year.

On 29 May 2009, Foley made his senior debut for Ireland against Nigeria in an international friendly. On 26 March 2011, he made his first competitive start for Ireland against Macedonia at right-back playing the full 90 minutes. He played two full games during Ireland's success at the 2011 Nations Cup.

Having been part of the team that achieved Ireland's first qualification for a major tournament since 2002, Foley was initially named in Giovanni Trapattoni's 23-man squad for UEFA Euro 2012. However, he suffered problems with a hamstring during pre-tournament preparations and then did not make the final list. Foley said he "felt betrayed" by Trapattoni's decision to exclude him on the morning of the squad submission. His replacement, Paul McShane, did not play a game at the tournament. Foley has not yet returned.

== Coaching career ==
=== Tampa Bay Rowdies ===
In 2020, Foley joined former Wolves teammate Neill Collins' staff with the Tampa Bay Rowdies in the USL Championship, the American second division. Foley left his position with the Rowdies following the 2021 season.

=== Forest Green Rovers ===
In January 2022, Foley joined former Wolves teammate Rob Edwards' staff with Forest Green Rovers in League Two, the English fourth tier. However, this position was unofficial as stated by the manager on 3 February 2022 in an interview with Gloucestershire Live. Foley left his position with Forest Green at the same time Edwards left in May 2022.

=== Brackley Town ===
In September 2022, Foley joined Roger Johnson's staff with Brackley Town Football Club in the National League North, the English sixth tier.

=== Luton Town ===
In July 2023, Foley joined Luton Town as a coach focusing on helping young players transition to the first team. He was later promoted to the role of first team coach following the appointment of manager Jack Wilshere.

== Career statistics ==
=== Club ===
As of end of 2017–18 season

Appearances and goals by club, season and competition
Club	Season	League			National Cup		League Cup		Other		Total	
Club	Season	Division	Apps	Goals	Apps	Goals	Apps	Goals	Apps	Goals	Apps	Goals
Luton Town	2002–03	Second Division	2	0	0	0	0	0	2 (Note: Appearance(s) in Football League Trophy)	0	4	0
Luton Town	2003–04	Second Division	33	1	3	0	2	2	0	0	38	3
Luton Town	2004–05	League One	39	2	2	0	0	0	0	0	41	2
Luton Town	2005–06	Championship	38	0	1	0	0	0	—		39	0
Luton Town	2006–07	Championship	39	0	2	0	3	0	—		44	0
Luton Town	Total		151	3	8	0	5	2	2	0	166	5
Wolverhampton Wanderers	2007–08	Championship	44	1	3	0	2	0	—		49	1
Wolverhampton Wanderers	2008–09	Championship	45	1	0	0	2	0	—		47	1
Wolverhampton Wanderers	2009–10	Premier League	25	0	3	0	1	0	—		29	0
Wolverhampton Wanderers	2010–11	Premier League	33	2	0	0	3	1	—		36	3
Wolverhampton Wanderers	2011–12	Premier League	16	0	1	0	1	0	—		18	0
Wolverhampton Wanderers	2012–13	Championship	26	0	1	0	0	0	—		27	0
Wolverhampton Wanderers	2013–14	League One	5	1	0	0	1	0	1	0	7	1
Wolverhampton Wanderers	2014–15	Championship	0	0	0	0	0	0	—		0	0
Wolverhampton Wanderers	Total		194	5	8	0	10	1	1	0	213	6
Blackpool (loan)	2013–14	Championship	5	0	—		—		—		5	0
Blackpool (loan)	2014–15	Championship	4	0	—		—		—		4	0
Blackpool (loan)	Total		9	0	—		—		—		9	0
Copenhagen	2014–15	Danish Superliga	4	0	0	0	—		—		4	0
Ipswich Town	2015–16	Championship	8	0	—		—		—		8	0
Charlton Athletic	2016–17	League One	15	0	2	0	1	0	2 (Note: Appearances in EFL Trophy)	0	20	0
Coventry City	2016–17	League One	12	0	—		—		—		12	0
Billericay Town	2017–18	Isthmian League Premier Division	15	0	5	0	—		1 (Note: Appearance in Essex Senior Cup)	0	21	0
Career total			408	8	23	0	16	3	6	0	453	11

=== International ===
As of match played 7 June 2011

Appearances and goals by national team and year
National team	Year	Apps	Goals
Republic of Ireland	2009	1	0
Republic of Ireland	2010	2	0
Republic of Ireland	2011	5	0
Total		8	0

== Honours ==
Luton Town

- Football League One: 2004–05

Wolverhampton Wanderers

- Football League Championship: 2008–09

Copenhagen

- Danish Cup: 2014–15

Billericay Town

- Isthmian League Premier Division: 2017–18
- Essex Senior Cup: 2017–18

Republic of Ireland

- Nations Cup: 2011

Individual

- Luton Town Young Player of the Season: 2001–02, 2002–03, 2003–04
- FAI Under-21 Player of the Year: 2005
- Wolverhampton Wanderers Player of the Season: 2008–09

== See also ==
- List of Republic of Ireland international footballers born outside the Republic of Ireland
