= Companies Court =

Specialist court of England and Wales

The Companies Court (now part of the Insolvency and Companies List) is a specialist court within the Chancery Division of the High Court of Justice of England and Wales, which deals with certain matters relating to companies. These include matters which are regulated by the Companies Acts, the Financial Services and Markets Act 2000, the Insolvency Acts in relation to companies registered in England and Wales, or the Company Directors Disqualification Act 1986, which must be commenced in the Companies Court.

The Companies Court was incorporated into the Insolvency and Companies List with effect from October 2017 as part of the reorganisation into the Business and Property Courts of England and Wales.

A large number of the cases within the list, including trials and appeals from the County Court, are heard by one of the seven Insolvency and Companies Court Judges in the High Court in London. Others are heard by High Court Justices assigned to the Chancery Division. Outside London, the majority of cases are heard by circuit judges and district judges.

== See also ==
- Companies Act 2006
- Insolvency Act 1986
