= John Gurney (football chairman) =

Property developer and former football club chairman

- Occupations: Businessman; property developer

Chairman of Luton Town
- In office 20 May 2003 – 14 July 2003
- Preceded by: Mike Watson-Challis
- Succeeded by: Bill Tomlins

John Gurney is a Columbian (British) businessman and former football club chairman. He came to national attention for his eventful 55-day spell as chairman of Luton Town in the summer of 2003, during which time he sacked a manager via post and organised a "Manager Idol" phone-in to find a new one, whilst announcing plans for a massive new stadium on stilts, a change of club name, and a potential relocation. He had previously owned non-league clubs Farnborough Town, Southall and Ashford United, and rugby club Bedford. He was arrested and charged with conspiring to import cocaine in February 1999, but acquitted after a trial.

== 1999 arrest and early sporting ventures ==
Gurney was one of ten people charged with conspiring to import cocaine in February 1999 following a police raid that uncovered 472 kg of the drug (valued at £100 million) in a lock-up garage in Leigh. The subsequent investigation saw him named as a "financial associate" of Brian Brendan Wright, who was sentenced to 30 years imprisonment in April 2007 after running an international cocaine smuggling empire. Gurney was acquitted following a trial in which the prosecution declined to provide any evidence. However Gurney's arrest put a stop to his consortium which was attempting to buy Conference club Farnborough Town. He went on to become involved in Southall, who were suspended from the Isthmian League due to a dispute over the club's ownership structure. He was also reported to have been "run out of town at Bedford Rugby Club". He had acquired the Bedford club for £1 from boxing promoter Frank Warren in 1999 and promptly sacked head coach Rudolf Straeuli and cut salaries; he attempted to merge the club with Coventry and move the club to Ashford. Gurney claimed that a man called Doug Braddock had taken control of the company that owned the club, Jefferson Lloyd International, without his knowledge and that it was Braddock who had sacked Straeuli. Gurney attempted to sell the rugby club to Coventry City Football Club, a move which was blocked by the Rugby Football Union, before Bedford residents managed to purchase the club for £750,000. Yet another non-league football club, Ashford United, were also acquired by Gurney and reportedly left in a financial mess upon his departure.

== Chairmanship of Luton Town ==
On 20 May 2003, Gurney led a consortium that successfully purchased Luton Town for the price of £4 from owner Mike Watson-Challis, who had been keen to offload the club as it was costing him a reported loss of £500,000 a month. Gurney claimed to be backed by "international investors", whose identities he never revealed. Within three days Gurney had sacked Luton manager Joe Kinnear and his assistant, Mick Harford; he informed the popular duo of their dismissal via post. He blamed chief executive Peter Miller for the sacking, claiming that "on a brief visit to this club from Northampton Town [Miller was also Northampton Town's commercial manager] took it upon himself to dismiss the club’s manager and assistant manager". He also banned local newspaper Luton on Sunday chief reporter Martin Buhagiar who had broken the stories and exposed his dealings. The newspaper’s editor at the time Aylia Fox said that "Gurney does not like us because we first broke the takeover story and have been the only paper since that has been telling it how it is.... [this is] straight from the you-couldn’t-make-it-up-if-you-tried department".

He outlined plans to build a Formula One track around a 70,000-capacity stadium, which would have a removable pitch supported over the top of the M1 motorway on concrete rafters. He claimed the track would net the club £50 million in profit a year. This new stadium would be shared with NFL and NBA franchises. He also aimed to change the club's name to London-Luton Football Club so as to link the club with a local airport. Upon meeting midfielder Kevin Nicholls he informed the player that he planned to install a one-armed bandit with a £25,000 payout in the dressing room. He allegedly told investors Luton were "a grotty little club".

He also raised the possibility of Luton merging with Wimbledon, a club located over 40 miles away, in order to secure a position in the league above. This idea had more of a grounding in reality as the move had come close to happening in 1983, when protests by supporters thwarted then-chairman Denis Mortimer's proposal. In 2004, Wimbledon controversially relocated to Milton Keynes to become the Milton Keynes Dons. The speculation damaged Gurney's credibility at Luton, with The Guardian reporting that "Gurney's naivety in talking publicly about such an unlikely scheme is alarming".

Gurney had intended to appoint Terry Fenwick as manager, but fan opposition led him to reconsider. Former Peterborough United chairman Roger Terrell and player Lee Power were set to be named as chairman and vice-chairman, but quit after fans threw fruit at them upon their arrival at Kenilworth Road. He then created a phone-vote to appoint the club's new manager, charging 50p per call to a premium landline, saying that he didn't like "being seen to give way to the mob so we’ve come up with the idea of Manager Idol based on Pop Idol"; he gave a list of eight candidates for fans to vote on: Fenwick, Kinnear, Nigel Clough, Steve Cotterill, Mike Newell, Stuart Pearce, Gardner Speirs and Guðjón Þórðarson. An initial vote eliminated five candidates and left just Kinnear, Newell and Cotterill. On 23 June, he announced the winner of "Manager Idol" to be Mike Newell, though it was reported that Kinnear had received 82% of the votes but refused to rejoin the club due to Gurney's involvement and Cotterill had also publicly ruled himself out. Gurney admitted "there’s all sorts of chaos [because] we failed to agree terms with Joe Kinnear, Steve Cotterill is not here and Mike is. And we said whoever was available and we agreed terms with by 1pm today would be the new manager, so Mike is the new manager".

The Luton Town Supporters' Trust was set up in order to wrestle control of the club from Gurney; Trust chairman Liam Day stated that "if [the situation] wasn't so serious, it would have been hilarious." The Trust convinced supporters and local sponsors to boycott season tickets and club sponsorship and instead pledge almost £300,000 towards the Trust. The club players and staff went unpaid throughout Gurney's tenure. The Football League placed the club under a transfer embargo and withheld television and league sponsorship money due to the ongoing uncertainty over the details of the club's ownership structure, citing "grave concern" with the set up after a meeting with Gurney where he refused point blank to provide any information. The Trust then acquired shares in the club's major creditor, Hatters Holdings, an offshore company that was owed several million pounds by the club. Now in control of Hatters Holdings, the Trust then placed the club into administrative receivership (a technically different process to administration) on 14 July 2003 to force out John Gurney after just 55 days in charge despite him warning them that: "If they expect me to walk away from Luton with nothing, I’ll make very sure there’s nothing to walk away from". A documentary on BBC Two called Trouble at the Top detailed his tenure, which was shown the following year, and in which he admitted that "I was the most hated man in football".

== Later life ==
Gurney was declared bankrupt in April 2008.
