= Bill Tomlins =

British businessman

Bill Tomlins was a British businessman who, along with a consortium, brought Luton Town FC out of administrative receivership in May 2004. The Hatters completed his full season in charge in May 2005, achieving the championship in the Coca-Cola League One. Tomlins was the chairman of LTFC until 11 April 2007 when he stood down and was succeeded by David Pinkney.

In June 2008, he was fined £15,000 and suspended from all football and football activities for a period of five years by The Football Association in respect of thirteen charges of misconduct made against him. At the same time Luton Town FC was fined £50,000 and had ten points deducted for routing of payments to agents not through The Football Association.

In September 2011, he was disqualified from acting as a director for six years following proceedings brought by the UK Insolvency Service related to this misconduct.
