= List of Luton Town F.C. players =

Luton Town Football Club is an English football club based since 1905 at Kenilworth Road, Luton, Bedfordshire. The club currently competes in EFL League One, the third tier of the English football league system. Founded in 1885, Luton Town became the first professional team in southern England six years later and joined The Football League in 1897. After leaving the League in 1900 due to financial strife, Luton Town competed in the Southern League until Football League membership was regained 20 years later. After an 89-year period of League membership, the team was relegated to the Conference Premier in 2009 due to a 30-point deduction imposed by the football authorities. Five seasons later, the club won promotion back to The Football League.

Luton Town's first team has competed in numerous nationally contested competitions, and the 50 players judged in 2009 the club's best by Denis O'Donoghue of The Times are listed below. In addition, all players who have appeared 100 times for the club in these competitions are given. Club record holders are also included, regardless of the number of matches they played.

Fred Hawkes holds the record for most league appearances for the club, having played 509 matches between 1901 and 1920. The closest to Hawkes's record is Bob Morton, who appeared 495 times between 1948 and 1964. Including all senior competitions, Morton leads the chart with 562 compared to Hawkes's 549. As of 1 July 2009, the player who has won the most international caps while at the club is Mal Donaghy, who appeared 58 times for Northern Ireland.

The goalscoring record is held by Gordon Turner, who scored 276 goals between 1949 and 1964. Turner's tally of 243 league goals is also a club record. Turner's nearest rival is Andy Rennie, whose 147 league goals, 162 in total, were scored between 1925 and 1934. Joe Payne holds the Luton Town record for the most goals scored in a season, set in 1936–37, with 55 league goals in 39 Third Division South games and 58 in all competitions. Payne also holds the Football League record for most goals in a match, with 10 during a 12–0 victory over Bristol Rovers on 13 April 1936. Turner holds the club record for most goals in a top-flight season, with 33 league goals and 38 overall during 1957–58.

== Key ==
- Players with name in **bold** currently play for the club.
- Players with this background and text in **bold** in the "Nationality" column won full international caps for their country while with the club. If no reliable source has yet been found for the exact number of such caps won, the caps column will be empty and a reference will be supplied for the player having been capped during the relevant period.
- ¤ Players with this background and symbol in the "Notes" column are club record holders, and have footnotes detailing their achievements.
- † Players with this background and symbol in the "Club career" column played for Luton for their entire football career.
- Years are the first and last calendar years in which the player appeared in competitive first-team football for the club.
- League appearances and goals comprise those in the Southern Football League, the United League, the Football League and the Conference Premier.
- Total appearances and goals comprise those in the Southern Football League, United League, Football League (including play-offs), Conference Premier, FA Cup, Football League Cup, Associate Members' Cup/Football League Trophy and several now-defunct competitions including the Anglo-Italian Cup, Texaco Cup, Watney Cup and Full Members' Cup.

== Notable players ==
Appearances and goals are for first-team competitive matches only; wartime matches are excluded. Substitute appearances are included. Statistics are complete up to and including the match played on 2 May 2026, the final day of the 2025–26 EFL League One season.

=== The Times top 50 (2009) ===
Following Luton Town's relegation from The Football League in April 2009, a list of the 50 best Luton Town players of all-time was compiled by The Times journalist Denis O'Donoghue. The players selected by O'Donoghue are given below.

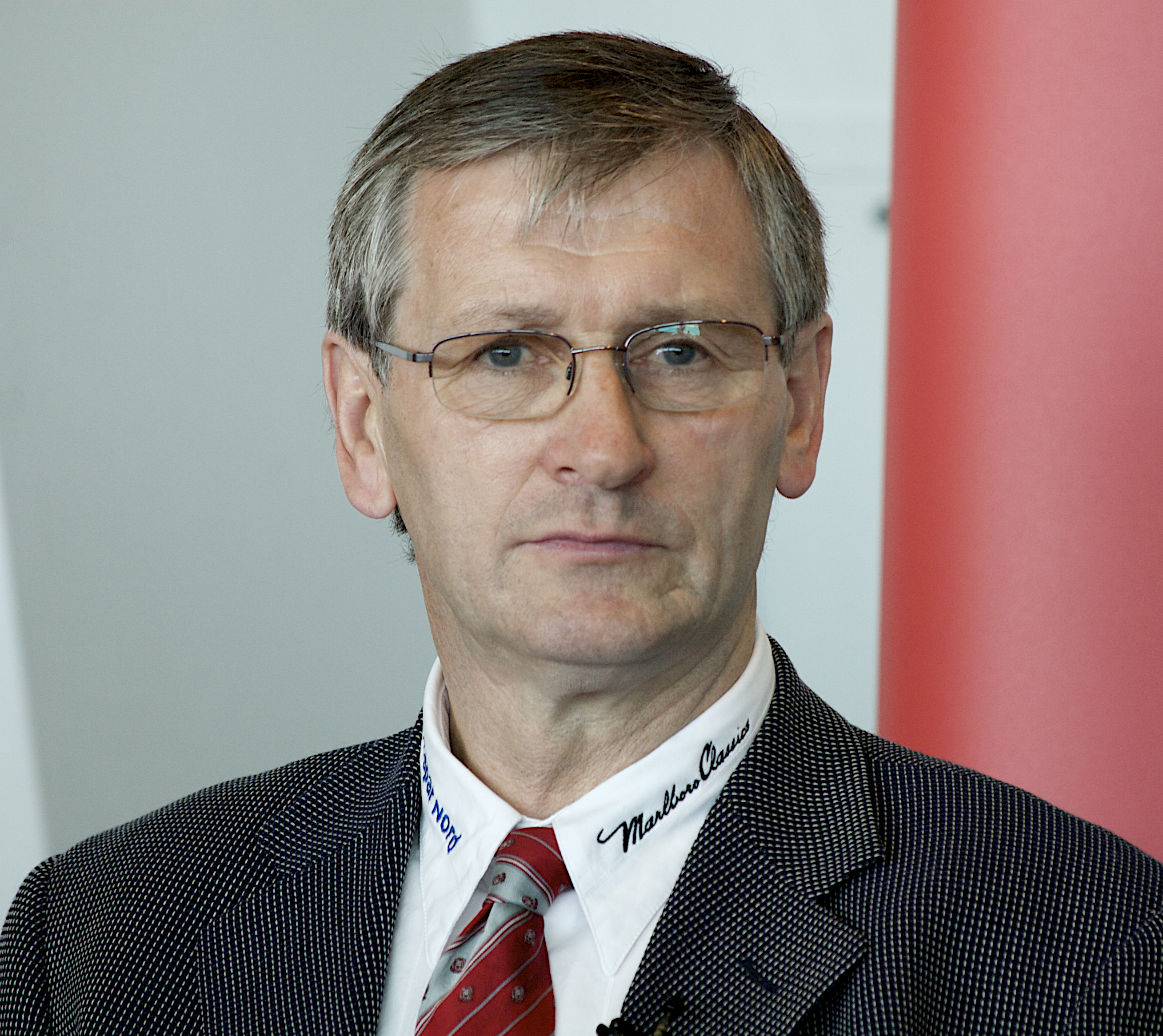
Bruce Rioch, pictured here in 2008, played for Luton from 1964 to 1969 and later became the first captain of Scotland born in England.

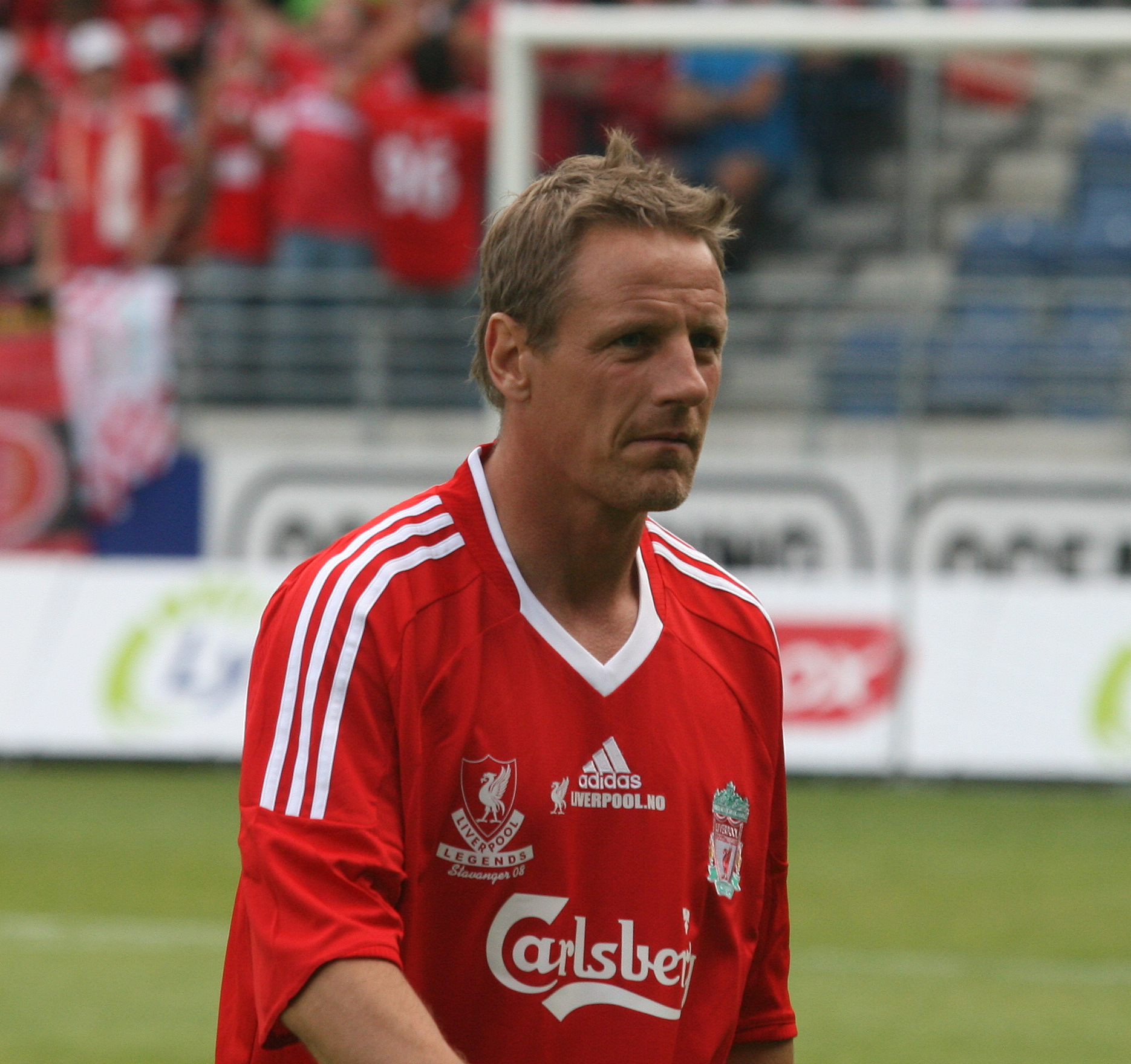
Paul Walsh played for Luton from 1982 until 1984, when he was sold to Liverpool. He is seen here in that club's colours following a 2008 match featuring former players.

Steve Foster, pictured in 2006, played for Luton from 1984 to 1989 and captained the club to its Football League Cup victory of 1987–88.

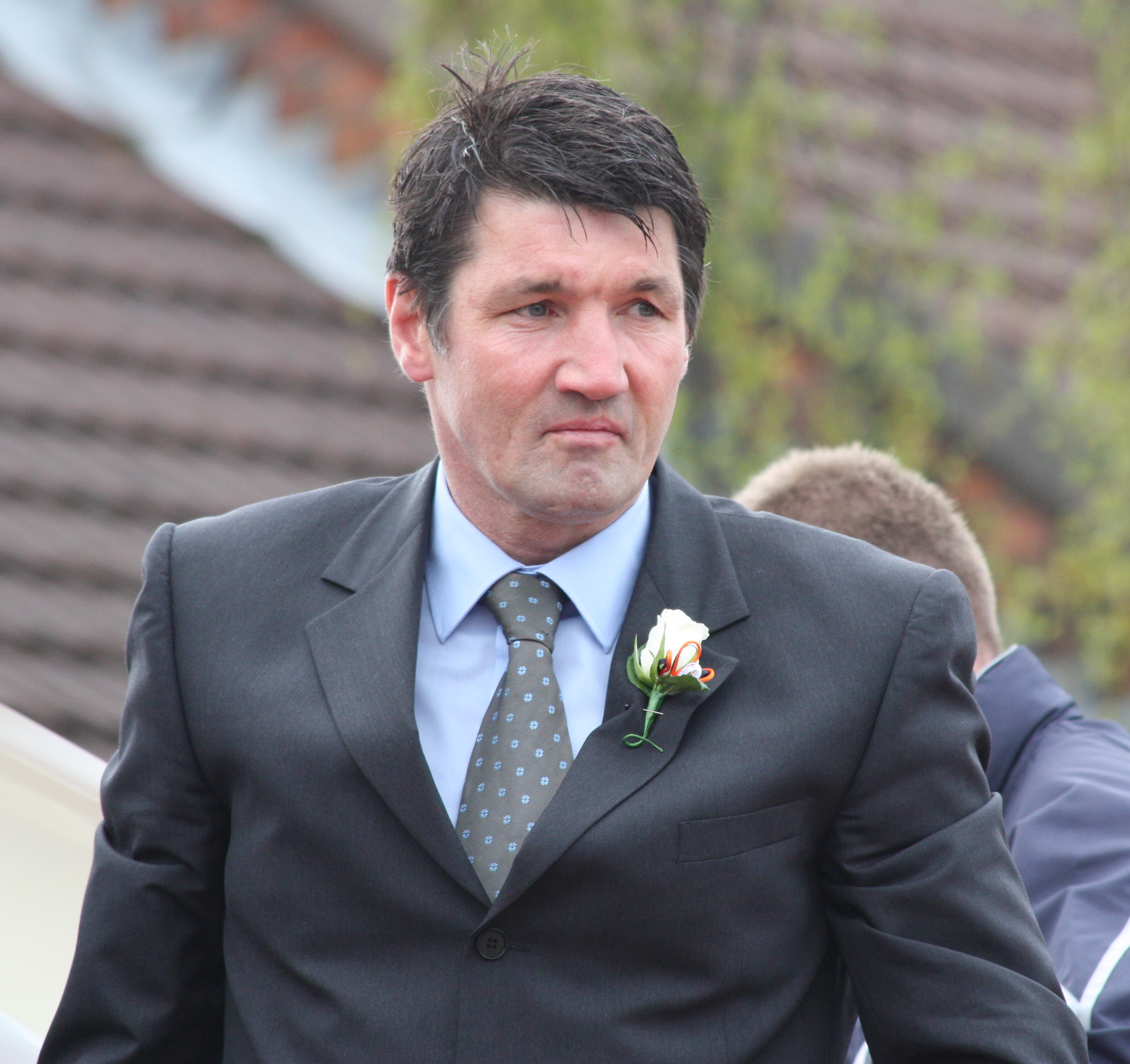
Mick Harford, pictured in 2009, is regarded as "one of Luton's finest players", and represented the club as both player and manager.

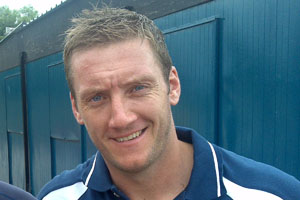
Steve Howard, pictured in 2009, scored 103 goals for the club between 2001 and 2006, giving him the club's sixth-highest goals total.

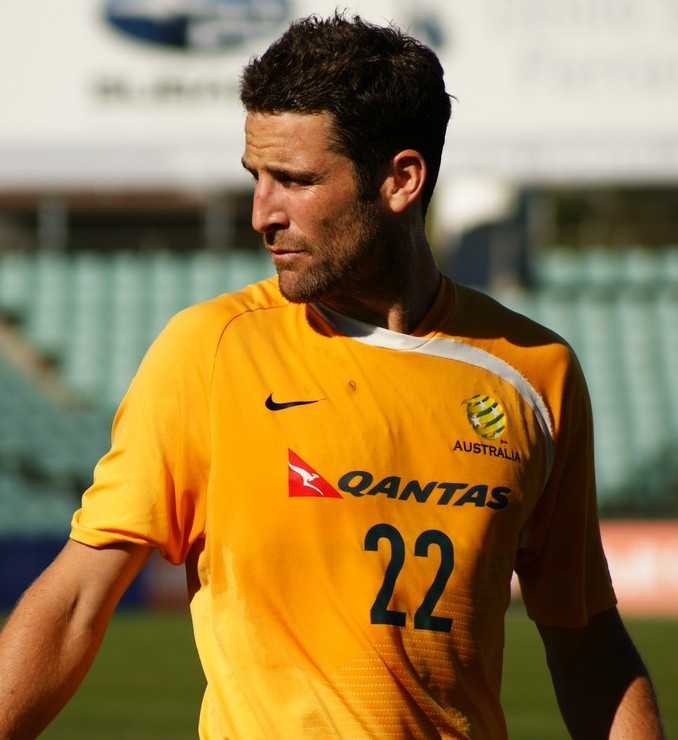
Chris Coyne played for the club from 2001 to 2008, captaining it from 2006. He is pictured here playing for Australia in 2008.

Name	International selection^{[a]}	Caps^{[a]}	Position^{[b]}	Club career	League^{[c]} apps	League goals	Total^{[d]} apps	Total goals	Notes
Andy Rennie	Scotland		Forward	1925–1934	307	147	335	162	
Joe Payne	England	1	Forward	1934–1938	72	83	77	87	¤^{[A]}
Hugh Billington	England		Forward	1938–1948	87	63	95	70	
Bernard Streten	England	1	Goalkeeper	1946–1957	276	0	301	0	
Syd Owen	England	3	Defender	1947–1959	388	3	423	3	
Bob Morton	England		Midfielder	1948–1964 †	495	48	562	55	¤^{[B]}
Gordon Turner	England		Forward	1949–1964	406	243	450	276	¤^{[C]}
Bert Mitchell	England		Midfielder	1951–1955	106	41	119	43	
Ron Baynham	England	3	Goalkeeper	1952–1965	388	0	432	0	
Jesse Pye	England		Forward	1952–1954	61	32	65	36	
George Cummins	Republic of Ireland	19	Forward	1953–1961	184	21	212	30	
Billy Bingham	Northern Ireland	8	Midfielder	1958–1960	97	27	102	33	
John O'Rourke	England		Forward	1963–1966	84	64	90	66	
Bruce Rioch	Scotland		Midfielder	1964–1969	149	46	167	51	
Graham French	England		Midfielder	1965–1973	182	21	202	3	
John Moore	Scotland		Defender	1965–1973	274	13	306	14	
Tony Read	England		Goalkeeper^{[D]}	1965–1972	203	12	233	12	
Alan Slough	England		Midfielder	1965–1973	275	28	312	32	
Terry Branston	England		Defender	1967–1971	101	9	118	19	
Mike Keen	England		Defender	1968–1972	144	11	160	11	
Brian Lewis	England		Forward	1968–1970	45	22	53	25	
Malcolm Macdonald	England		Forward	1969–1971	88	49	101	58	
John Aston	England		Midfielder	1972–1978	174	31	201	37	
John Faulkner	England		Defender	1972–1978	209	6	239	7	
Bobby Thomson	England		Defender	1972–1976	110	1	135	2	
Alan West	England		Midfielder	1973–1981	285	16	317	17	
Steve Buckley	England		Defender	1974–1978	123	9	135	9	
Paul Futcher	England		Defender	1974–1978	131	1	142	1	
Ron Futcher	England		Forward	1974–1978	120	40	133	43	
Ricky Hill	England	3	Midfielder	1975–1989	436	54	507	65	
Brian Stein	England	1	Forward	1977–1988; 1991–1992	427	130	496	154	
Mal Donaghy	Northern Ireland	58	Defender	1978–1988; 1989–1990	415	16	488	21	¤^{[E]}
David Moss	England		Midfielder	1978–1985	221	88	245	94	
Kirk Stephens	England		Defender	1978–1984	227	2	248	2	
Raddy Antić	Yugoslavia		Midfielder	1980–1984	100	9	108	10	
Brian Horton	England		Midfielder	1981–1984	118	8	132	10	
Paul Walsh	England	5	Forward	1982–1984	80	24	89	28	¤^{[F]}
Tim Breacker	England		Defender	1983–1990	210	3	262	3	
Les Sealey	England		Goalkeeper	1983–1990	207	0	259	0	
Steve Foster	England		Defender	1984–1989	163	11	213	14	
Mick Harford	England	2	Forward	1984–1990; 1991–1992	168	69	216	92	
David Preece	England		Midfielder	1984–1995	336	21	394	27	
Marvin Johnson	England		Defender	1987–2002 †	373	7	440	10	
Tony Thorpe	England		Forward	1993–1998; 1998; 1999; 2002–2003	164	70	193	85	
Matthew Taylor	England		Defender	1999–2002	129	16	146	17	
Steve Howard	Scotland		Forward	2001–2006	212	96	228	103	
Chris Coyne	Australia		Defender	2001–2008	221	14	252	17	
Kevin Nicholls	England		Midfielder	2001–2006; 2008–2010	216	30	237	33	
Jean-Louis Valois	France		Midfielder	2001–2002	34	6	40	6	
Curtis Davies	England		Defender	2003–2005	56	2	62	2	¤^{[G]}

=== Other Luton Town centurions and record holders ===
Players other than those selected by O'Donoghue who either made 100 first-team appearances for Luton Town or hold a club record appear here.

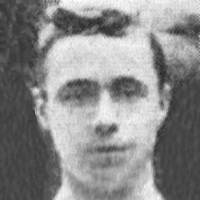
Fred Hawkes, born in Luton and pictured c. 1906, holds the record for most Luton Town league appearances.

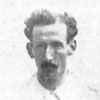
Bob Hawkes, pictured in 1908, represented Luton for 19 years and was the team's first international player.

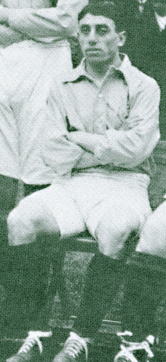
Louis Bookman played 110 times for Luton between 1919 and 1922, also representing Ireland during that time. Here is pictured here while with Ireland in 1914.

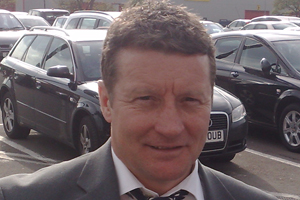
Northern Ireland international Danny Wilson scored Luton's second goal in the 1988 League Cup Final and appeared for the club 142 times between 1987 and 1990. He is pictured here in 2008.

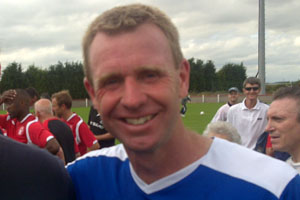
Midfielder David Oldfield, seen in 2010, played for Luton from 1986 to 1989 and from 1995 to 1998.

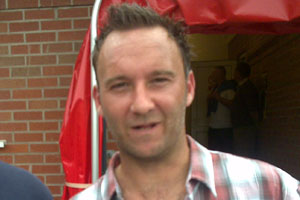
Scott Oakes, a Luton player from 1991 to 1996, pictured in 2010.

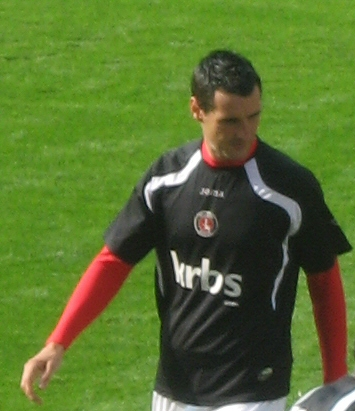
Matthew Spring represented Luton 357 times over two spells (1997–2004 and 2007–2008), scoring 43 goals. In this 2009 photograph he is seen in Charlton Athletic colours.

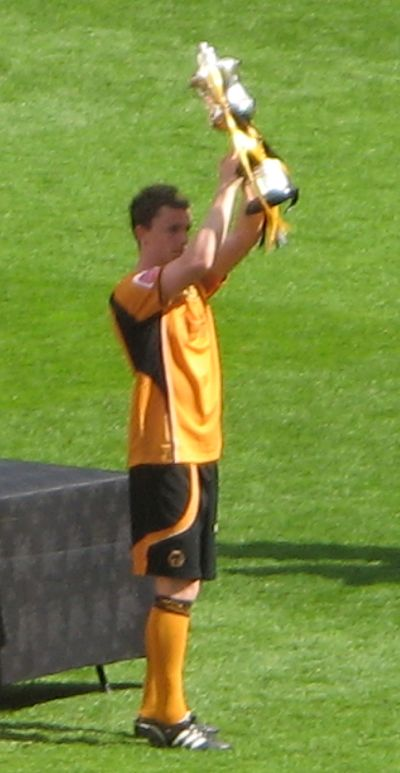
Luton-born Kevin Foley played 166 times for his home-town club between 2002 and 2007. He is seen here in 2009 as a Wolverhampton Wanderers player.

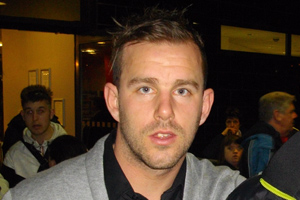
Forward Rowan Vine, pictured in 2011, scored 33 goals for Luton between 2005 and 2007.

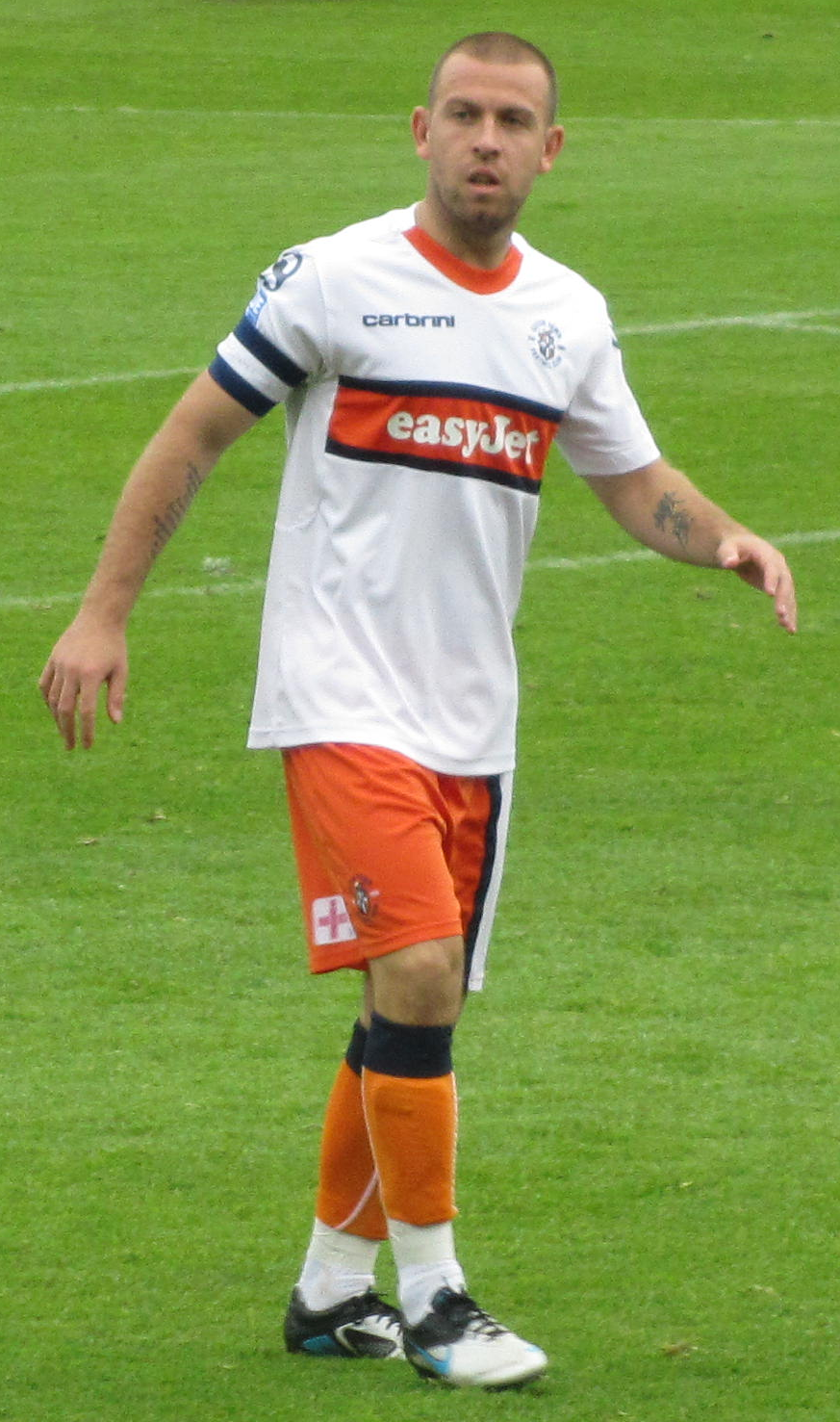
Keith Keane, seen here in 2011. Born in Luton, he made his first-team debut in 2003 and made 284 appearances for the club across four different leagues before leaving in 2012.

Name	International selection^{[a]}	Caps^{[a]}	Position^{[b]}	Club career	League^{[c]} apps	League goals	Total^{[d]} apps	Total goals	Notes
Jimmy Durrant	England		Midfielder	1897–1904; 1913–1914	155	30	177	40	
Tom McInnes	Scotland		Forward	1897–1900	93	20	109	29	
Harry Williams	England		Defender	1898–1905	144	3	157	3	
Bill McCurdy	Scotland		Defender	1899–1901; 1905–1909	193	0	211	1	
Fred Hawkes	England		Midfielder	1899–1920 †	509	22	549	25	¤^{[H]}
Fred White	England		Defender	1900–1909 †	237	10	257	11	
Bob Hawkes	England	5	Midfielder	1901–1920 †	349	40	382	43	¤^{[F]}^{[I]}
Herbert Moody	England		Forward	1901–1905; 1907–1912	232	93	247	104	
Billy Barnes	England		Forward	1904–1907	101	12	107	12	
Peter Platt	England		Goalkeeper	1905–1909	130	0	139	0	
Abe Jones	England		Defender	1906–1910	136	12	141	12	
Harry Stansfield	England		Midfielder	1908–1912	135	24	144	24	
Syd Hoar	England		Midfielder	1913–1915; 1919–1925	221	36	237	39	
Ernie Simms	England	1	Forward	1913–1915; 1916–1922	160	109	178	122	
Louis Bookman	Ireland	3	Midfielder	1919–1922	101	8	110	9	
Arthur Roe	England		Midfielder	1919–1925	117	1	124	1	
George Butcher	England		Midfielder	1920–1925	121	23	129	25	
George Lennon	Scotland		Defender	1920–1923	107	0	115	0	
Alf Tirrell	England		Defender	1920–1924	122	4	130	5	
Jimmy Walker	Scotland		Defender	1920–1926	133	4	138	4	
Rob Millar	Scotland		Defender	1920–1930	205	4	213	4	
Bob Graham	Scotland		Defender	1921–1929	164	5	175	5	
Bill Jennings	England		Defender	1922–1926	114	2	117	2	
Syd Reid	Wales		Forward	1922–1928	134	70	143	81	
George Dennis	England		Forward	1924–1929	139	41	150	44	
David Richards	England		Defender	1925–1931	147	0	152	0	
John Black	Scotland		Defender	1926–1930	91	4	101	4	
Charles Fraser	England		Defender	1926–1935 †	246	4	270	4	
Henry Kingham	England		Defender	1926–1937	250	0	275	0	
Jimmy Yardley	England		Forward	1926–1932	173	78	188	94	
Harry Woods	England		Forward	1926–1932	97	22	105	13	
George Harford	England		Goalkeeper	1929–1934	99	0	107	0	
Hugh McGinnigle	Scotland		Defender	1930–1937	159	2	177	3	
Fred Kean	England		Defender	1931–1935	117	5	141	6	
Tom Mackey	England		Defender	1932–1938	183	2	208	2	
George Martin	Scotland		Midfielder	1933–1937	98	27	105	29	
Joe Coen	Scotland		Goalkeeper	1934–1939	142	0	158	0	
Fred Roberts	England		Forward	1934–1945	180	38	198	45	
Tom Smith	England		Defender	1934–1939	157	1	172	1	
George Stephenson	England		Forward	1934–1939	192	58	212	69	
Bill Fellowes	England		Defender	1935–1938	110	3	124	3	
John Finlayson	Scotland		Defender	1935–1939	154	9	168	9	
Jack Nelson	England		Defender	1935–1939	134	1	148	1	
Harry Cooke	England		Defender	1946–1953	210	4	228	4	
Doug Gardiner	England		Defender	1946–1951	121	1	134	1	
Wally Shanks	England		Defender	1946–1957	264	6	275	6	
Billy Waugh	Scotland		Midfielder	1946–1950	135	9	147	12	
Tom Aherne	Ireland / Republic of Ireland^{[J]}	1 / 14^{[J]}	Defender	1948–1957	267	0	288	0	
George Stobbart	England		Forward	1949–1952	107	30	116	30	
Charlie Watkins	Scotland		Defender	1949–1955	218	16	239	20	
Les Jones	Wales		Defender	1950–1958	98	1	110	1	
Jim Pemberton	England		Defender	1950–1958	92	8	100	10	
Mick Cullen	Scotland	1	Forward	1951–1958	112	16	125	19	
Roy Davies	South Africa		Midfielder	1951–1957	150	24	171	27	
Seamus Dunne	Republic of Ireland	15	Defender	1951–1961	301	0	323	0	
Jimmy Adam	Scotland		Midfielder	1953–1959	137	22	140	24	
John Groves	England		Defender	1953–1963	218	16	251	18	
Terry Kelly	England		Defender	1954–1963	136	1	150	1	
Allan Brown	Scotland		Forward	1956–1961	151	51	172	59	
Brendan McNally	Republic of Ireland	3	Defender	1956–1963	134	3	164	3	
Ken Hawkes	England		Defender	1957–1961	90	1	102	1	
Dave Pacey	England		Defender	1957–1965	246	16	277	19	
John Bramwell	England		Defender	1960–1965	187	1	206	2	
Harry Walden	England		Midfielder	1960–1964	96	11	106	12	
Fred Jardine	Scotland		Defender	1961–1970	220	9	243	10	
Tommy McKechnie	Scotland		Forward	1961–1966	131	31	146	34	
Gordon Riddick	England		Midfielder	1962–1967	102	16	114	17	
Ray Whittaker	England		Midfielder	1963–1969	170	40	188	45	
Keith Allen	England		Forward	1966–1973	137	36	154	43	
Max Dougan	Scotland		Defender	1966–1970	118	0	132	0	
John Ryan	England		Midfielder	1970–1976	266	10	304	11	
Peter Anderson	England		Midfielder	1970–1976	181	34	208	40	
Keith Barber	England		Goalkeeper	1970–1977	142	0	158	0	
Jimmy Ryan	Scotland		Midfielder	1970–1977	184	21	214	25	
Alan Garner	England		Defender	1971–1975	88	3	112	4	
Don Shanks	England		Defender	1971–1975	90	2	110	5	
Paul Price	Wales	11	Defender	1972–1981	207	8	230	8	
Jimmy Husband	England		Forward	1973–1978	143	44	162	48	
Lil Fuccillo	England		Midfielder	1974–1983	160	24	180	27	
Mark Aizlewood	Wales		Defender	1978–1982	98	3	110	4	
Jake Findlay	Scotland		Goalkeeper	1978–1985	167	0	187	0	
Wayne Turner	England		Midfielder	1978–1985	84	2	102	3	
Mitchell Thomas	England		Defender	1982–1986; 1993–1999	292	5	336	5	
Ashley Grimes	Republic of Ireland	2	Midfielder	1984–1989	87	3	115	4	
Peter Nicholas	Wales	15	Midfielder	1984–1987	102	1	116	1	
Richard Harvey	England		Defender	1986–1998	162	4	191	5	
Darron McDonough	England		Midfielder	1986–1992	105	5	129	7	
Kingsley Black	Northern Ireland	16	Midfielder	1987–1992	127	26	157	30	
Julian James	England		Defender	1987–1998	282	13	335	14	
David Oldfield	England		Midfielder	1987–1989; 1995–1998	146	22	172	33	
Danny Wilson	Northern Ireland	15	Midfielder	1987–1990	110	24	142	30	
Alec Chamberlain	England		Goalkeeper	1988–1993	138	0	158	0	
John Dreyer	England		Defender	1988–1994	214	13	249	15	
Lars Elstrup	Denmark	6	Forward	1989–1991	60	19	70	27	¤^{[K]}
Ceri Hughes	Wales	6	Midfielder	1989–1997	175	17	206	20	
Paul Telfer	Scotland		Midfielder	1990–1995	144	19	165	22	
Phil Gray	Northern Ireland	5	Forward	1991–1993; 1997–2000	140	43	161	53	
Des Linton	England		Defender	1991–1997	83	1	104	1	
Scott Oakes	England		Midfielder	1991–1996	173	27	200	34	
Trevor Peake	England		Defender	1991–1998	179	0	202	0	
Paul McLaren	Scotland		Midfielder	1993–2001	167	4	202	6	
Juergen Sommer	United States	3	Goalkeeper	1993–1995	82	0	103	0	
Kelvin Davis	England		Goalkeeper	1994–1999	91	0	105	0	
Dwight Marshall	England		Forward	1994–1999	128	28	156	39	
Gary Waddock	Republic of Ireland		Midfielder	1994–1998	153	3	172	3	
Graham Alexander	Scotland		Midfielder	1995–1999	150	15	180	17	
Steve Davis	England		Defender	1995–1999	138	21	175	27	
Stuart Douglas	England		Forward	1995–2002	146	18	173	23	
Ian Feuer	United States		Goalkeeper	1995–1998	85	0	100	0	
Andrew Fotiadis	England		Forward	1996–2003	123	18	147	20	
Matthew Spring	England		Midfielder	1997–2004; 2007–2008	308	36	357	43	
Liam George	Republic of Ireland		Forward	1997–2002	102	20	124	24	
Alan White	England		Defender	1997–2000; 2009–2010	99	4	115	4	
Emmerson Boyce	England		Defender	1998–2004	186	8	212	9	
Peter Holmes	England		Midfielder	2000–2007	105	11	127	12	
Ahmet Brković	Croatia		Midfielder	2001–2008	194	31	223	38	
Russell Perrett	England		Defender	2001–2007	99	9	108	9	
Sol Davis	England		Defender	2002–2009	199	3	229	3	
Kevin Foley	Republic of Ireland		Defender	2002–2007	151	3	166	5	
Steve Robinson	Northern Ireland	2	Midfielder	2002–2008	185	9	211	12	
Dean Brill	England		Goalkeeper	2003–2009; 2012–2013	88	0	109	0	
Marlon Beresford	England		Goalkeeper	2003–2004; 2004–2008	116	0	132	0	
Keith Keane	Republic of Ireland		Midfielder	2003–2012	237	7	284	8	
Enoch Showunmi	Nigeria	2	Forward	2003–2006	102	14	114	16	
Rowan Vine	England		Forward	2004–2007	112	31	121	33	
Dean Morgan	England		Forward	2005–2008	88	11	101	12	
Jake Howells	Wales		Midfielder	2008–2016	273	29	334	31	
Claude Gnakpa	France		Midfielder	2008–2011	105	22	134	27	
George Pilkington	England		Defender	2008–2012	140	11	169	12	
Mark Tyler	England		Goalkeeper	2009–2016	257	0	297	0	
Alex Lawless	Wales		Midfielder	2010–2016	169	18	203	22	
Andre Gray	England		Forward	2012–2014	97	52	111	57	
Jonathan Smith	England		Midfielder	2012–2017	149	10	176	11	
Steve McNulty	England		Defender	2013–2016	117	2	125	2	
Scott Griffiths	England		Defender	2013–2016	105	3	115	3	
Pelly Ruddock Mpanzu	DR Congo	3	Midfielder	2013–2025	363	23	412	23	
Cameron McGeehan	Northern Ireland		Midfielder	2014; 2015–2017	98	28	106	31	
Elliot Lee	England		Forward	2015; 2017–2022	104	27	124	30	
Scott Cuthbert	Scotland		Defender	2015–2018	97	3	111	4	
Dan Potts	England		Defender	2015–2024	195	10	216	12	
Olly Lee	England		Midfielder	2015–2018	105	10	123	11	
Alan Sheehan	Republic of Ireland		Defender	2016–2020	117	6	135	9	
Glen Rea	Republic of Ireland		Midfielder	2016–2023	184	7	207	8	
James Justin	England		Defender	2016–2019	90	6	114	6	
Danny Hylton	England		Forward	2016–2022	147	54	170	62	
James Collins	Republic of Ireland	10	Forward	2017–2021	174	68	183	72	
Andrew Shinnie	Scotland		Midfielder	2017–2021	90	6	106	10	
Harry Cornick	England		Forward	2017–2023	211	34	235	38	
James Shea	England		Goalkeeper	2017–	93	0	121	0	
Luke Berry	England		Midfielder	2017–2024	158	24	184	26	
Sonny Bradley	England		Defender	2018–2023	163	5	175	6	
Matty Pearson	England		Defender	2018–2021	128	10	136	10	
James Bree	England		Defender	2019–2023	132	2	143	2	
Jordan Clark	England		Midfielder	2020–	197	24	220	31	
Tom Lockyer	Wales	6	Defender	2020–2025	102	5	117	7	
Kal Naismith	Scotland		Defender	2021–2022; 2025–	112	6	123	7	
Elijah Adebayo	England		Forward	2021–2026	168	43	184	47	
Amari'i Bell	Jamaica	26	Defender	2021–2025	137	2	157	2	
Reece Burke	England		Defender	2021–2025	86	2	101	4	
Alfie Doughty	England		Defender	2022–2025	91	5	105	6	
Carlton Morris	England		Forward	2022–2025	123	39	137	39	

=== Notes ===
a ^{1} ^{2} ^{3} ^{4} Unless sourced individually, international selection and caps are sourced to the capped players list at Hatters Heritage.
b ^{1} ^{2} For a full description of positions see Football Positions.
c ^{1} ^{2} Southern Football League and United League appearances and goals sourced to Collings, The Luton Town Story 1885–1985.
Football League appearances and goals for players whose career ended up to and including 1997 sourced to Bailey, The Definitive Luton Town F.C.. This list excludes games played in the abandoned 1939–40 season.
League appearances and goals for players whose career ended post-1997 sourced to Soccerbase.
d ^{1} ^{2} Other appearances and goals sourced to Bailey, The Definitive Luton Town F.C. unless the player's career ended post-1997, in which case they are sourced to Soccerbase.

== Footnotes ==
A. Joe Payne holds the club record for most league goals in a season (55 in 1936–37). He also holds the Football League record for most goals in a match – 10 against Bristol Rovers on 13 April 1936.
B. Bob Morton holds the records for most Luton Town appearances in both the Football League (495) and in all competitions (562).
C. Gordon Turner holds the records for most Luton Town goals scored in both the league (243) and in all competitions (276).
D. Tony Read was unusually utilised as both a goalkeeper and as a forward – he is listed here as a goalkeeper as he appeared more often in that position.
E. Mal Donaghy holds the club record for most international appearances while with the club, with 58 of his 91 for Northern Ireland coming while he was at Kenilworth Road.
F. ^{a} ^{b} With five England caps, Paul Walsh shares the record for most England appearances by a Luton Town player with Bob Hawkes.
G. Curtis Davies became Luton Town's most expensive sale when he was sold to West Bromwich Albion for £3,000,000 on 31 August 2006.
H. Fred Hawkes holds the records for most league appearances for Luton Town, with 509.
I. Bob Hawkes became the first Luton Town player to be capped by any country when he appeared for England against Ireland on 16 February 1907.
J. While a Luton Town player, the dual Irish international Tom Aherne made one appearance for the Irish Football Association-controlled all-Ireland team and 14 for the Football Association of Ireland-affiliated Ireland team.
K. Lars Elstrup became Luton Town's most expensive signing ever when the club paid £850,000 to buy him from Odense Boldklub on 17 August 1989.
