= List of Luton Town F.C. records and statistics =

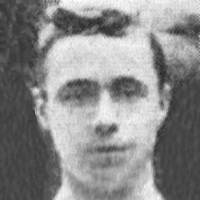
Fred Hawkes holds the record for most Luton Town league appearances, with 509.

Luton Town Football Club is an English professional football club based in Luton, Bedfordshire. The club was founded in 1885 and became the first professional club in southern England in 1891. Luton Town have played at all professional levels of English football and are currently contesting the 2023–24 season in the first tier, Premier League. Luton Town have been Football League members for 104 seasons: from 1897 to 1900; from 1920 to 2009, and from 2014 to 2023.

The record for most games played for the club is held by Bob Morton, who made 562 appearances between 1946 and 1964. Gordon Turner is the club's record goalscorer, with 276 goals across his 450 appearances for Luton. Mal Donaghy made 58 appearances for Northern Ireland and so is the Luton Town player who has gained the most caps while with the club. The highest transfer fee paid by the club is the £2 million paid to Barnsley for striker Carlton Morris in 2022, and the highest fees received is the £8 million fee paid by Leicester City for Luton-born James Justin, in 2019. The highest attendance recorded at Kenilworth Road was 30,069 for the visit of Blackpool in 1959. One Football League record is held by a Luton Town player—the 10 goals scored by forward Joe Payne in 1936 against Bristol Rovers is the most scored in any Football League match by a single player.

All records are correct as of the 2022–23 season.

== Honours and achievements ==
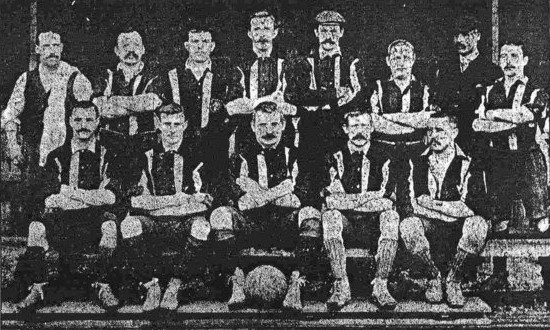
The Luton Town squad of 1897–98, which won the United League

Luton Town have won some major honours in English football. The club reached its first major final in 1959, when the team reached the FA Cup Final, and the 1988 Football League Cup Final was the side's first major cup victory. The team have also won a Football League Trophy (in 2008–09) and finished as runners-up in the Full Members Cup and Football League Cup (in 1987–88 and 1988–89 respectively).

Luton Town have won all three of the present Football League divisions, and have achieved promotion as runners-up on four other occasions. Outside of the League, the club have finished as runners-up in the Southern League consecutive seasons; 1894–95, runners-up in the United League in 1896–97, and United League champions in 1897–98. More recently, the club were crowned as Conference Premier champions in the 2013–14 season.

=== Football pyramid ===
- Football League First Division (tier 1)
  - Best finish: seventh, 1986–87
- Football League Second Division (tier 2)
  - Champions: 1981–82
  - Runners-up: 1954–55, 1973–74
  - Play-off winners: 2022–23
- Football League Third Division (tier 3)
  - Champions: 1936–37 (South), 2004–05, 2018–19
  - Runners-up: 1935–36 (South), 1969–70
- Football League Fourth Division / Football League Third Division^{[A]}^{[B]} (tier 4)
  - Champions: 1967–68
  - Runners-up: 2001–02, 2017–18
- Conference Premier (tier 5)
  - Champions: 2013–14

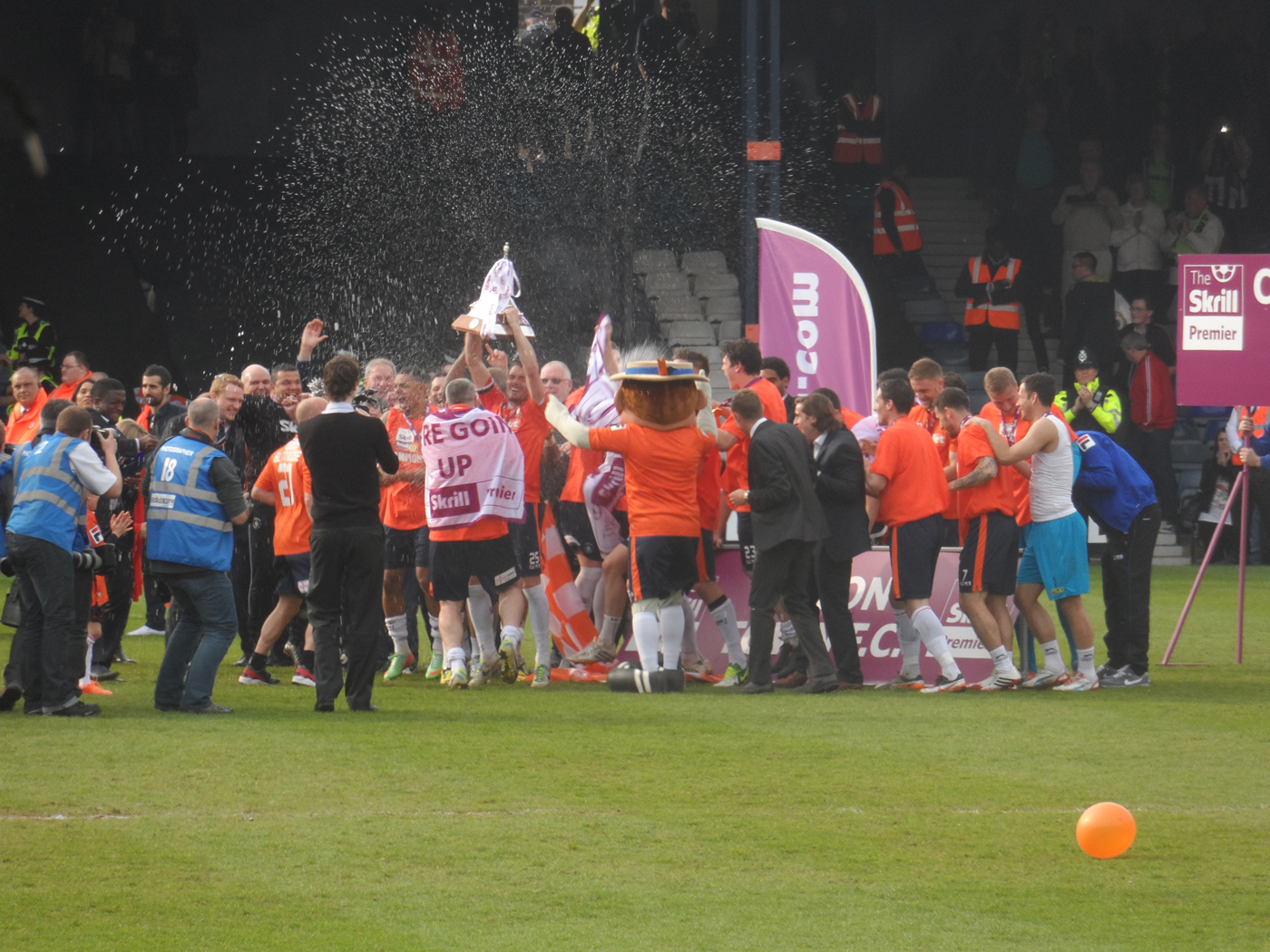
Ronnie Henry lifts the Conference Premier championship trophy at the end of the 2013–14 season

Luton Town were the first club to be relegated from the top division to the fourth (relegated from First Division in 1959–60, started playing in Fourth Division in 1965–66) and then subsequently win promotion back to the top flight (promoted from Fourth Division in 1968–69 and started playing in First Division in 1974–75).

=== Domestic cup competitions ===
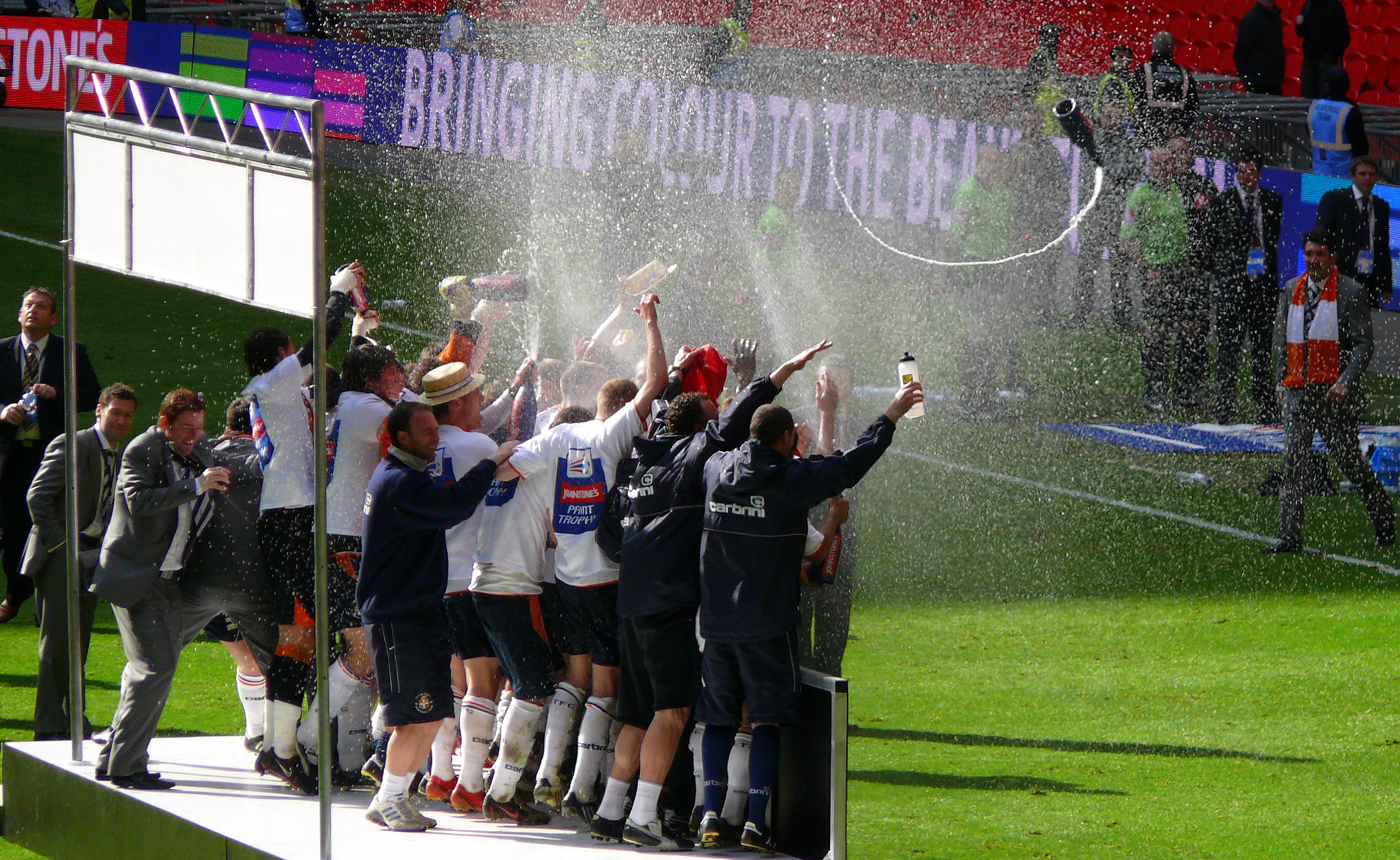
Luton Town celebrate winning the Football League Trophy in 2009

- FA Cup
  - Runners-up: 1958–59
- Football League Cup
  - Winners: 1987–88
- Bedfordshire Senior Cup
  - Winners: 1896–97, 1898–99, 1900–01, 1901–02, 1903–04, 1905–06, 1943–44, 2011–12, 2017–18, 2022–23
- Southern Professional Floodlit Cup
  - Winners: 1956–57
- Full Members Cup
  - Runners-up: 1987–88
- Football League Trophy
  - Winners: 2008–09

Uniquely, the club won the Football League Trophy and were relegated from the Football League in the same season.

=== Minor honours ===
- United League
  - Champions: 1897–98

== Player records ==
=== Award winners ===
- FWA Footballer of the Year
  - Syd Owen; 1958–59
- PFA Young Player of the Year
  - Paul Walsh; 1983–84

=== Appearances ===
- Youngest first-team player: Connor Tomlinson; 15 years, 199 days (against Gillingham, 30 August 2016)
- Oldest first-team player: Trevor Peake; 40 years, 222 days (against Wrexham, 20 September 1997)

==== Most appearances ====
Competitive first-team appearances only; substitutes appear in parentheses.

¤ —Played their full career at Luton Town

#	Name	Nation	Years	League	FA Cup	League Cup	Other^{[C]}	Total
1	Bob Morton	England	1948–64 ¤	495 (0)	48 (0)	7 (0)	12 (0)	562 (0)
2	Fred Hawkes	England	1899–1920 ¤	509 (0)	40 (0)	0 (0)	0 (0)	549 (0)
3	Ricky Hill	England	1975–89	429 (7)	33 (0)	37 (1)	0 (0)	499 (8)
4	Brian Stein	England	1977–88; 1991–92	411 (16)	31 (0)	34 (1)	3 (0)	479 (17)
5	Mal Donaghy	Northern Ireland	1978–88; 1989–90	415 (0)	36 (0)	34 (0)	3 (0)	488 (0)
6	Gordon Turner	England	1949–64	406 (0)	25 (0)	7 (0)	12 (0)	450 (0)
7	Marvin Johnson	England	1987–2002 ¤	352 (21)	20 (1)	27 (2)	16 (1)	415 (25)
8	Ron Baynham	England	1952–65	388 (0)	31 (0)	5 (0)	8 (0)	432 (0)
9	Syd Owen	England	1947–59	388 (0)	27 (0)	0 (0)	8 (0)	423 (0)
10	Pelly Ruddock	DRC	2014–2024	363 (26)	19 (0)	12 (0)	18 (0)	412 (23)

=== Goals ===
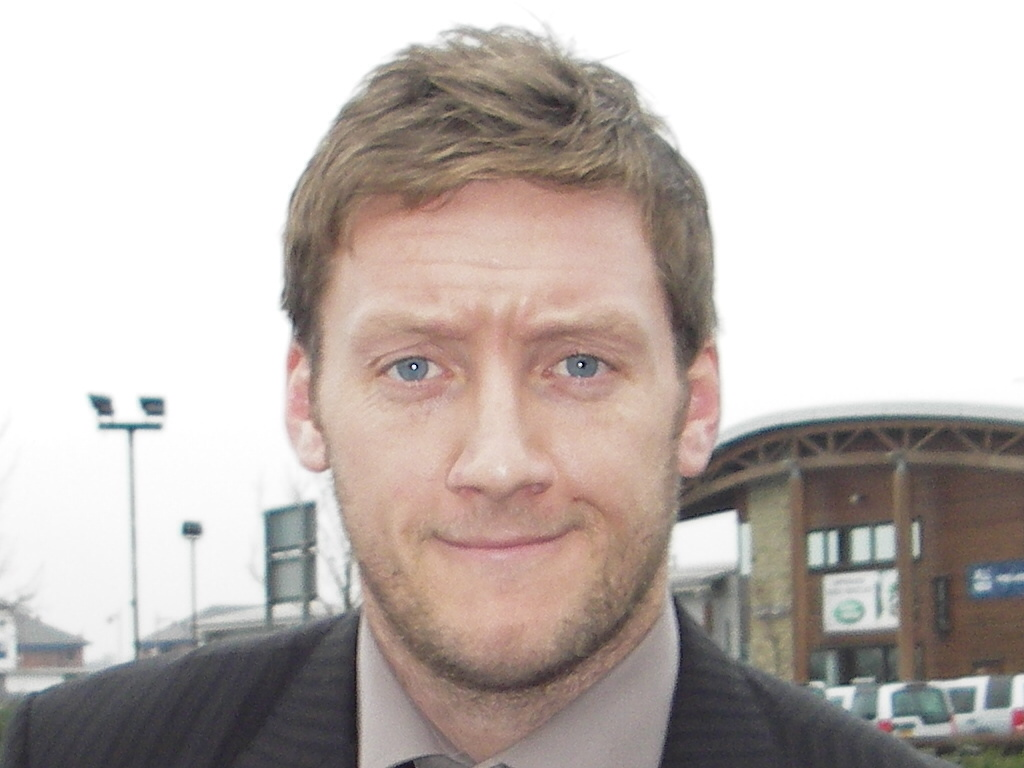
Steve Howard was the club's top goalscorer for five seasons in a row—2001–02 to 2005–06.

- Most goals in a season: Joe Payne; with 58 during the 1936–37 season (including 55 league goals).
- Most goals in a match: Joe Payne; with 10 in match versus Bristol Rovers on 13 April 1936, which remains to this day, a Football League record.

==== Top goalscorers ====
Competitive first-team appearances only; appearances including substitutes appear in parentheses and italics.

#	Name	Nation	Years	League	FA Cup	League Cup	Other^{[C]}	Total
1	Gordon Turner	England	1949–64	243 (406)	18 (25)	4 (7)	11 (12)	276 (450)
2	Andy Rennie	Scotland	1925–34	147 (307)	15 (26)	0 (0)	0 (2)	162 (335)
3	Brian Stein	England	1977–88; 1991–92	130 (427)	6 (31)	15 (35)	3 (3)	154 (496)
4	Ernie Simms	England	1913–15; 1916–22	109 (160)	13 (18)	0 (0)	0 (0)	122 (178)
5	Herbert Moody	England	1901–05; 1907–12	93 (232)	11 (15)	0 (0)	0 (0)	104 (247)
6	Steve Howard	Scotland	2001–06	96 (212)	5 (8)	2 (7)	0 (1)	103 (228)
7=^{[D]}	David Moss	England	1978–85	88 (221)	3 (8)	3 (16)	0 (0)	94 (245)
7=^{[D]}	Jimmy Yardley	England	1926–32	78 (173)	16 (15)	0 (0)	0 (0)	94 (188)
9	Mick Harford	England	1984–90; 1991–92	69 (168)	10 (27)	10 (17)	3 (4)	92 (216)
10	Joe Payne	England	1934–38	83 (72)	4 (5)	0 (0)	0 (0)	87 (77)

=== Transfers ===
==== Record transfer fees paid ====
#	Fee (GBP)	Paid to	Name	Nation	Date	Notes
1	£1,800,000	Barnsley F.C.	Carlton Morris	England	6 July 2022	
2	£1,200,000	Rijeka	Simon Sluga	Croatia	19 July 2019	
3	£850,000	Odense Boldklub	Lars Elstrup	Denmark	21 August 1989	
4	£750,000	Burnley	Steve Davis	England	13 July 1995	
5	£580,000	West Ham United	Ian Feuer	United States	16 December 1995	

==== Record transfer fees received ====
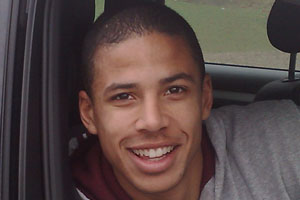
Curtis Davies was transferred from Luton Town to West Bromwich Albion for £3,000,000 on 31 August 2005.

#	Fee (GBP)	Received from	Name	Nation	Date	Notes
1	£8,000,000	Leicester City	James Justin	England	28 June 2019	
2	£4,000,000	Bournemouth	Jack Stacey	England	8 July 2019	
3=^{[E]}	£3,000,000	West Bromwich Albion	Curtis Davies	England	31 August 2005	
3=^{[E]}	£3,000,000	Birmingham City	Rowan Vine	England	11 January 2007	^{[F]}
4	£2,750,000	West Bromwich Albion	Leon Barnett	England	26 July 2007	
5	£2,500,000	Arsenal	John Hartson	Wales	13 January 1995	

=== International ===
This section refers only to caps won while a Luton Town player.

- First capped player: Robert Hawkes; for England against Ireland on 16 February 1907.
- First international goalscorer: Joe Payne; for England against Finland on 20 May 1937.
- Most capped player: Mal Donaghy; 58 of his 91 appearances for Northern Ireland came while at Luton Town.
- Most capped player for England: Robert Hawkes, Paul Walsh; both with 5 caps while a Luton player.
- First player to appear in the World Cup Finals: Syd Owen; for England against Belgium in Basel on 17 June 1954.
- Most World Cup Finals appearances: Mal Donaghy; 7 (4 in 1982, 3 in 1986).

== Managerial records ==
- First full-time manager: George Thompson (managed the club for 25 games from February to October 1925).
- Longest serving manager: David Pleat (managed the club for 600 games over two spells; 393 games from 25 January 1978 to 16 May 1986 and 207 games from 6 June 1991 to 14 June 1995).
- Longest spell as manager: Dally Duncan (managed the club for 503 games from June 1947 to October 1958).
- First manager from outside England: John McCartney (Scottish—managed the club for 151 games from September 1927 to December 1929).
- First manager from outside the United Kingdom: Joe Kinnear (Irish—managed the club for 122 games from 8 February 2001 to 23 May 2003).^{[G]}

== Club records ==
=== Goals ===
- Most league goals in a season: 103 in 42 matches, Third Division South, 1936–37.
- Fewest league goals in a season: 38 in 42 matches, First Division, 1991–92.
- Most league goals conceded in a season: 95 in 34 matches, Second Division, 1898–99.
- Fewest league goals conceded in a season:

35 in 42 matches, Third Division South, 1921–22.
35 in 46 matches, Conference Premier, 2013–14.

=== Points ===
- Most league points in a season:
  - Two points for a win: 66, 1967–68, Fourth Division.
  - Three points for a win: 101, 2013–14, Conference Premier.
- Fewest league points in a season:
  - Two points for a win: 18, 1899–1900, Second Division.
  - Three points for a win: 26,^{[H]} 2008–09, League Two.

=== Clean sheets ===
- Most clean sheets in a season: 23 in 46 matches, Conference Premier, 2013–14.

=== Matches ===
==== Firsts ====
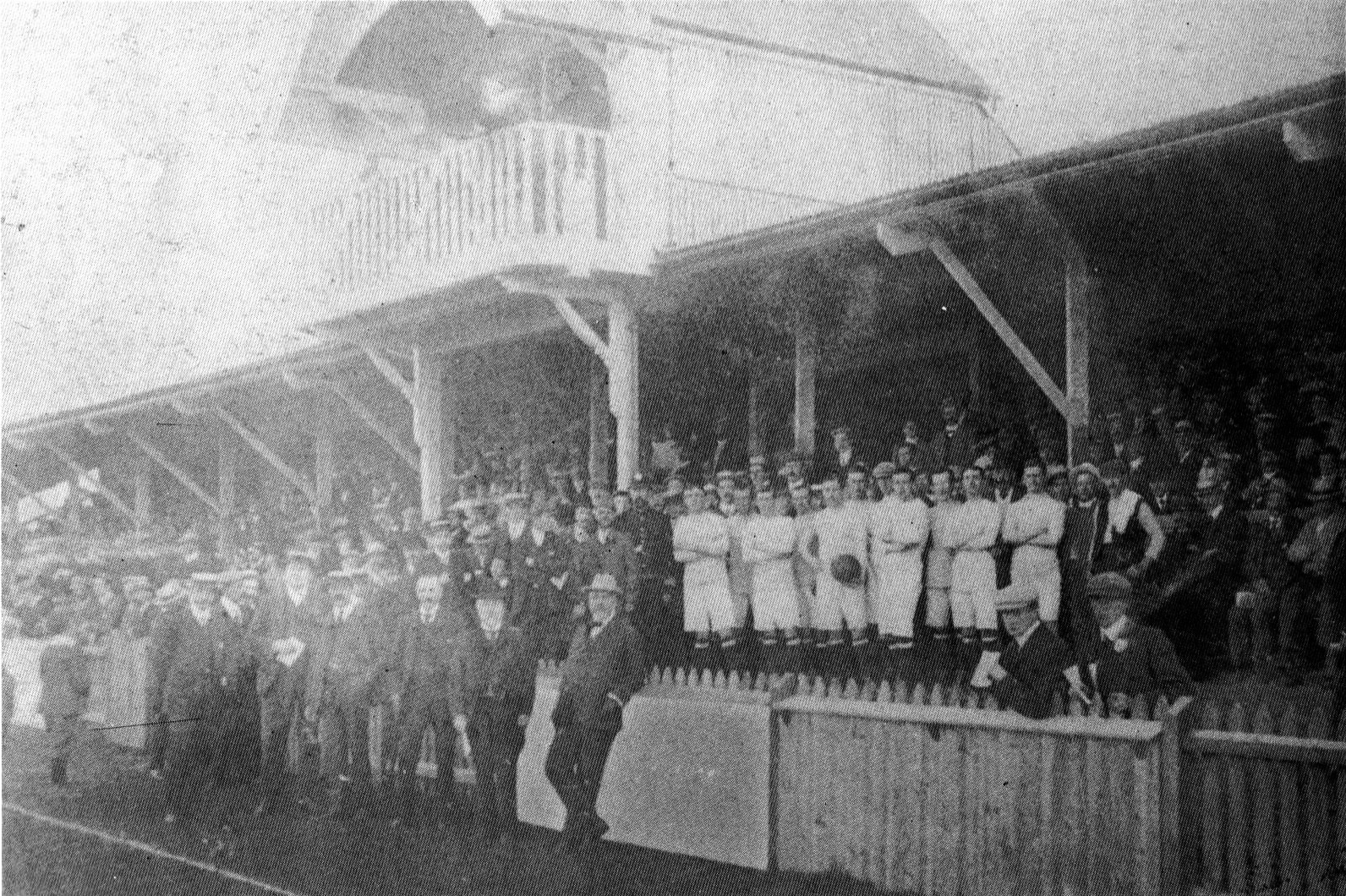
Kenilworth Road on 4 September 1905, just before Luton's first game there, against Plymouth Argyle

- First competitive match: Great Marlow 3–0 Luton Town, FA Cup first round, 31 October 1885.
- First Southern League match: Luton Town 3–4 Millwall Athletic, First Division, 6 October 1894.
- First United League match: Luton Town 2–3 Millwall Athletic, 12 September 1896.
- First match at Dunstable Road: Luton Town 3–0 Loughborough, 3 April 1897.
- First Football League match: Leicester Fosse 1–1 Luton Town, Second Division, 4 September 1897.
- First match at Kenilworth Road: Luton Town 0–0 Plymouth Argyle, 4 September 1905.
- First Football League Third Division South Cup match: Aldershot 4–3 Luton Town, 28 February 1934.
- First First Division match: Charlton Athletic 2–2 Luton Town, 20 August 1955.
- First Football League Cup match: Liverpool 1–1 Luton Town, second round, 19 October 1960.
- First Watney Cup match: Colchester United 1–0 Luton Town, quarter-final, 31 July 1971.
- First European match: Luton Town 4–0 Bari, Anglo-Italian Cup group stage, 7 March 1973.
- First Texaco Cup match: Luton Town 1–1 Southampton, 3 August 1974.
- First Full Members Cup match: Everton 1–2 Luton Town, third round, 16 February 1988.
- First Football League Trophy match: Luton Town 2–1 Leyton Orient, first round, 10 December 1996.
- First Football Conference match: AFC Wimbledon 1–1 Luton Town, Conference Premier, 8 August 2009.
- First FA Trophy match: Cambridge United 3–1 Luton Town, first round, 12 December 2009.

==== Record wins ====
- Record win: Luton Town 15–0 Great Yarmouth Town, FA Cup, 21 November 1914.
- Record League win: Luton Town 12–0 Bristol Rovers, Third Division South, 13 April 1936.
- Record away win:

Exeter City 0–5 Luton Town, Fourth Division, 21 October 1967.
Colchester United 0–5 Luton Town, Second Division, 21 April 2003.
Ebbsfleet United 1–6 Luton Town, Conference Premier, 20 March 2010.
Kettering Town 0–5 Luton Town, Conference Premier, 1 January 2012.
Alfreton Town 0–5 Luton Town, Conference Premier, 7 December 2013.
Nuneaton Town 0–5 Luton Town, Conference Premier, 22 February 2014.
Swindon Town 0–5 Luton Town, League Two, 26 December 2017.

- Record Football League Cup win: Luton Town 7–2 Mansfield Town, 3 October 1989.
- Record European win: Luton Town 5–0 Ancona, Anglo-Italian Cup group stage, 13 December 1995.

==== Record defeats ====
- Record defeat: Small Heath 9–0 Luton Town, Second Division, 12 November 1898.
- Record home defeat: Luton Town 0–7 93rd Highland Regiment, 4 October 1890, FA Cup.
- Record home League defeat:

Luton Town 0–5 Manchester United, First Division, 12 February 1984.
Luton Town 0–5 Sunderland, Championship, 6 May 2007.
Luton Town 1–6 Leicester Fosse, Second Division, 14 January 1899.
Luton Town 1–6 Charlton Athletic, Second Division, 10 February 1962.
Luton Town 2–7 Shrewsbury Town, Fourth Division, 10 March 1965.

- Record League Cup defeat:

Everton 5–1 Luton Town, 24 September 1968.
Reading 5–1 Luton Town, 26 August 2008.

- Record European defeat: Genoa 4–0 Luton Town, Anglo-Italian Cup group stage, 11 October 1995.

==== Record consecutive results ====
- Record consecutive wins: 12, from 19 February 2002 to 6 April 2002, Third Division.
- Record consecutive league games unbeaten: 28, from 27 October 2018 to 6 April 2019, League One.
- Record consecutive home games unbeaten: 39, from 26 September 1925 to 30 April 1927, Third Division South.
- Record consecutive away games unbeaten: 13, from 26 August 2017 to 26 December 2017, League Two & from 27 October 2018 to 30 March 2019, League One.
- Record consecutive away league games unbeaten: 15, from 24 September 2013 to 25 March 2014, Conference Premier.
- Record consecutive clean sheets in all competitions: 7, from 13 October 1923 to 23 November 1923, Third Division South.

==== Attendances ====
- Highest home attendance: 30,069 against Blackpool in the FA Cup sixth round Replay on 4 March 1959.
- Highest home attendance in a league match: 27,911 against Wolverhampton Wanderers on 5 November 1955.
- Highest home attendance in the Football League Cup: 27,023 against Arsenal on 6 October 1970.

== European statistics ==
=== Record by season ===
Below is Luton Town's record in European competitions. As of the 2018–19 season, the only European competition the club have taken part in is the Anglo-Italian Cup, and they never progressed past the group stage of that tournament. Luton Town have also qualified for the UEFA Cup, as winners of the Football League Cup in 1987–88; however, they were unable to compete due to the ban of English clubs from European competitions following the Heysel Stadium Disaster.

Season	Competition	Round	Date	Country	Club	Venue	Result^{[I]}	Attendance	Notes
1972–73	Anglo-Italian Cup	Group A	7 March 1973	Italy	Bari	Home	4–0	unknown	
1972–73	Anglo-Italian Cup	Group A	21 March 1973	Italy	Hellas Verona	Away	1–2	unknown	
1972–73	Anglo-Italian Cup	Group A	4 April 1973	Italy	Fiorentina	Home	1–0	unknown	
1972–73	Anglo-Italian Cup	Group A	2 May 1973	Italy	Lazio	Away	2–2	unknown	
1988–89	UEFA Cup	Unable to compete due to ban on English clubs in UEFA competitions due to Heysel Stadium disaster							^{[J]}
1992–93	Anglo-Italian Cup	Group 5	15 September 1992	England	Watford	Away	0–0	5,197	
1992–93	Anglo-Italian Cup	Group 5	29 September 1992	England	Bristol City	Home	1–1	2,538	
1993–94	Anglo-Italian Cup	Group 6	31 August 1993	England	Watford	Away	1–2	2,854	
1993–94	Anglo-Italian Cup	Group 6	7 September 1993	England	Southend United	Home	1–1	1,823	
1995–96	Anglo-Italian Cup	Group A	5 September 1995	Italy	Perugia	Home	1–4	2,352	
1995–96	Anglo-Italian Cup	Group A	11 October 1995	Italy	Genoa	Away	0–4	3,759	
1995–96	Anglo-Italian Cup	Group A	8 November 1995	Italy	Cesena	Away	1–2	461	
1995–96	Anglo-Italian Cup	Group A	13 December 1995	Italy	Ancona	Home	5–0	2,091	

=== Record by opposition nationality ===
Competition		Played	Won	Drawn	Lost	Goals for	Goals against
Anglo-Italian Cup	against English clubs	4	0	3	1	3	4
Anglo-Italian Cup	against Italian clubs	8	3	1	4	15	14
Total		12	3	4	5	18	18

=== Record by location ===
==== Record at Kenilworth Road ====
Opposition nationality	Played	Won	Drawn	Lost	Goals for	Goals against
English	2	0	2	0	2	2
Overseas	4	3	0	1	11	4
Total	6	3	2	1	13	6

==== Record away from Kenilworth Road ====
Opposition nationality	Played	Won	Drawn	Lost	Goals for	Goals against
English	2	0	1	1	1	2
Overseas	4	0	1	3	4	10
Total	6	0	2	4	5	12

== Footnotes ==
A. Before the start of the 2004–05 season, Football League re-branding saw the First Division become the Football League Championship. The Second and Third Divisions became Leagues One and Two, respectively.
B. Upon its formation for the 1992–93 season, the FA Premier League became the top tier of English football; the First, Second and Third Divisions then became the second, third and fourth tiers, respectively.
C. ^{a} ^{b} The "Other" column constitutes goals and appearances (including those as a substitute) in the Football League Third Division South Cup, Southern Professional Floodlit Cup, Full Members Cup, Anglo-Italian Cup, Football League Trophy and play-offs.
D. Seventh equal
E. Third equal
F. Birmingham City originally paid £2.5 million for Rowan Vine, but promotion to the Premier League at the end of the season resulted in an extra £500,000 being paid, raising the total fee to £3 million.
G. Joe Kinnear was the club's first manager from outside the United Kingdom to manage the club in a match—Terry Mancini, another Irishman, had a spell as the club's caretaker manager (3–11 January 1990) but did not manage the club in a match.
H. Luton Town earned 56 points, but 30 were deducted at the start of the season, giving them a total of 26. The lowest total, not including point deductions, is 37, in 1990–91.
I. Luton Town result always given first
J. Luton Town qualified for the UEFA Cup 1988–89 by winning the Football League Cup in 1987–88, but could not compete due to the ban of English clubs from European competition following the Heysel Stadium Disaster.
