= Bob Hawks =

Bob Hawks may refer to:

- Bob Hawks (Montana politician) (born 1941), member of the Montana Senate
- Bob Hawks (Tennessee politician) (born 1926), member of the Tennessee House of Representatives

== See also ==
- Bob Hawk (1907–1989), American radio quizmaster and comic
- Bob Hawke (1929–2019), Prime Minister of Australia
- Bob Hawkes (1880–1945), English footballer
- Bob Hawkes (swimmer) (1921–2012), American paralympic archer, athlete, swimmer and wheelchair basketball player
