= Senator Hawks =

Senator Hawks may refer to:

- Bill Hawks (born 1944), Mississippi State Senate
- Bob Hawks (Montana politician) (born 1941), Montana State Senate
