= Tirel =

Tirel (pronounced [tiʁɛl]) is a French surname which may have either been a nickname for a stubborn person (Old French: tirel, for a draught animal, from French tirer "to pull") or alternatively be a surname of baptismal origin from the personal name Thorvald (composite of Old Norse Þórr "Thor" and valdr "wielder", "ruler"). It is the source of the frequent English surnames Tyrrell, Tyrell, Terrell, Tirrell and Turrell.
Notable people with this name include:

- Christiane Tirel (born 1939), French botanist
- Élodie Tirel (born 1972), French author of children's literature
- Guillaume Tirel (ca. 1310 – 1395), French chef
- John Tirel (died 1395), Irish judge
- Walter Tirel (1065 – after 1100), Anglo-Norman nobleman
