= Tirrell =

Tirrell may refer to:

== People ==
=== Surname ===
- Albert Tirrell (1824–1880), man acquitted of murder by the sleepwalking defense
- Alf Tirrell (1894–1944), English footballer
- Charles Q. Tirrell (1844–1910), American politician
- David A. Tirrell (born 1953), American chemist
- Lynne Tirrell, American philosopher
- Matthew Tirrell (born 1950), American chemical engineer

=== Given name ===
- Tirrell Greene (born 1972), American football offensive lineman

== Places ==
- Tirrell Mountain, a mountain in Adirondack Mountains of New York
