= Sleep emailing =

Sleeping phenomenon

Sleep messaging (or sleep emailing or sleep texting) is a phenomenon related to sleepwalking where people send emails or other textual communications in a combined state of sleep and wakefulness.

Jim Fulop of OhioHealth Sleep Services attributed sleep texting to situations where a person might "wake up confused, they grab (their phone) and they’re off mumbling in the text message". Elizabeth Dowdell of Villanova University noted that the idea of people answering the phone in their sleep was "not particularly new", and the new technology gave another route for this type of behaviour.
