= Sleepwalking =

Sleeping phenomenon combined with wakefulness

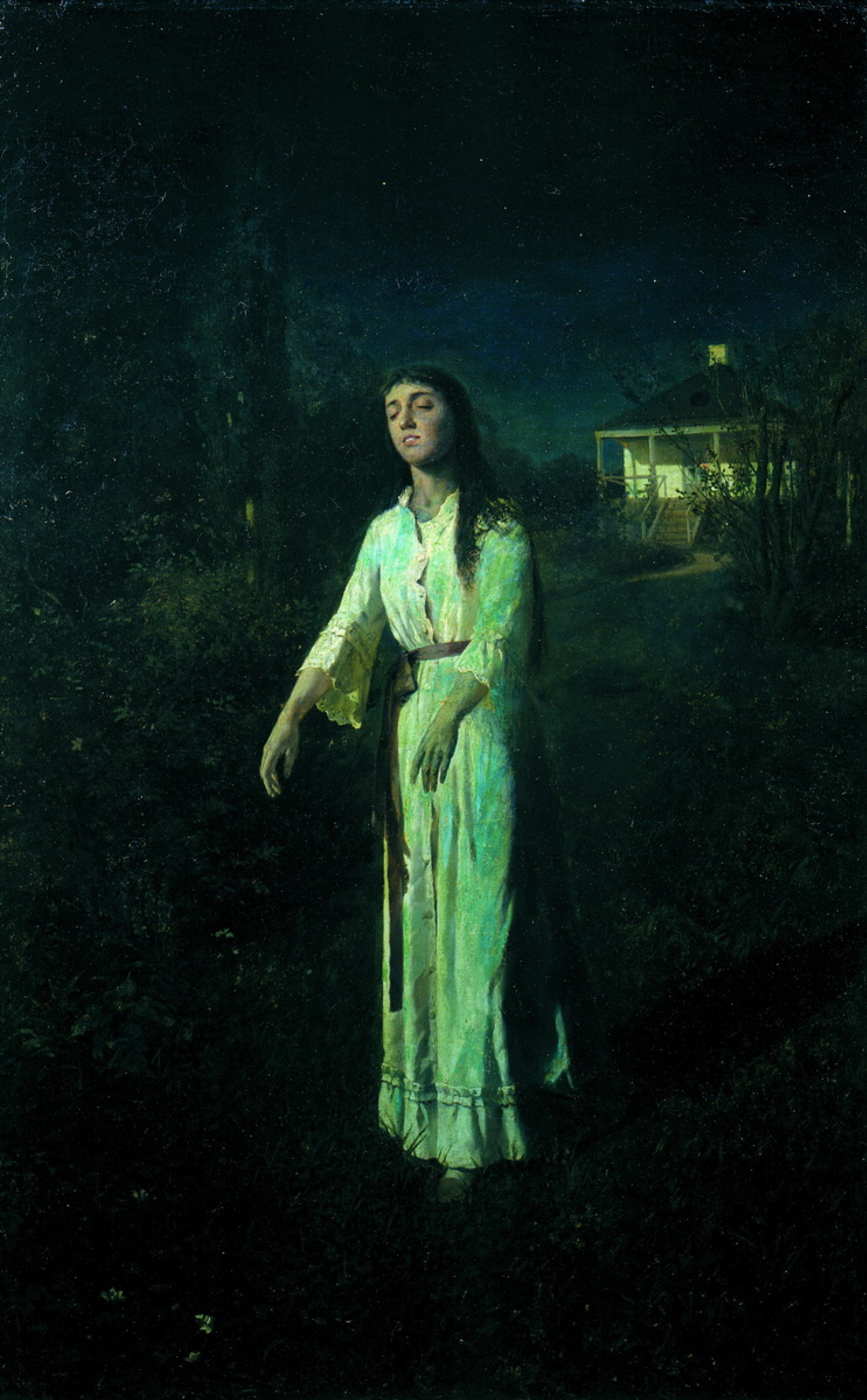
- Ivan Kramskoi, Somnambula, 1871
- Specialty: Sleep medicine, Neurology, Psychiatry

Sleepwalking, also known as somnambulism or noctambulism, is a phenomenon of combined sleep and wakefulness. It is classified as a sleep disorder belonging to the parasomnia family. It can also be understood as a disorder of state dissociation, which features of wakefulness and deep non-REM sleep occurring simultaneously in different brain regions. It occurs during the slow wave stage of sleep, in a state of low consciousness, with performance of activities that are usually performed during a state of full consciousness. These activities can be as benign as talking, sitting up in bed, walking to a bathroom, consuming food, and cleaning, or as hazardous as cooking, driving a motor vehicle, violent gestures and grabbing at hallucinated objects.

Although sleepwalking cases generally consist of simple, repeated behaviors, there are occasionally reports of people performing complex behaviors while asleep, although their legitimacy is often disputed. Sleepwalkers often have little or no memory of the incident, although some partial recall has been reported. Although their eyes are open, their expression is dim and glazed over. This may last from 30 seconds to 30 minutes.

Sleepwalking occurs during slow-wave sleep (N3) of non-rapid eye movement sleep (NREM sleep) cycles. It typically occurs within the first third of the night when slow-wave sleep is most prominent. Usually, it will occur once in a night, if at all.

== Signs and symptoms ==
Sleepwalking is characterized by:

- partial arousal during non-rapid eye movement (NREM) sleep, typically during the first third of the night
- dreamy content that may or may not be recalled when awake
- dream-congruent motor behavior that may be simple or complex
- impaired perception of the environment
- impaired judgement, planning and problem-solving.

Despite how it is portrayed in many cultures (eyes closed and walking with arms outstretched), the sleepwalker's eyes are open but may appear as a glassy-eyed stare or blank expression and pupils are dilated. Despite their reduced sensory perception due to being asleep, sleepwalkers demonstrate some ability to navigate their surrounding environment due to a combination of simple stumbling and habit. They are often disoriented, consequent to awakening: the sleepwalker may be confused and perplexed, and might not know why or how they got out of bed; however, the disorientation will fade within minutes. They may talk while sleepwalking, but the talk typically does not make sense to the observer. There are varying degrees of amnesia associated with sleepwalking, ranging from no memory at all, vague memories or a narrative.

=== Associated disorders ===
Most studies look at sleep disorders in adults, but children can also be affected. In the ten percent of the population that experiences sleep-related disorders, children are most affected due to their developing brains. A study conducted in Australia, looked at sleepwalking and its association with sleep behaviors in children. It was found that sleepwalking could be associated with children's bedtime routines. Those who have behavioral problems are more likely to develop a sleep disorder and should be assessed. The relationship between sleepwalking and the behavioral and emotional problems are more associated than their bedtime routines. This may very well be because sleep related disorders and sleepwalking happen simultaneously; one cannot exist without the other.

In the study "Sleepwalking and Sleep Terrors in Prepubertal Children" it was found that, if a child had another sleep disorder – such as restless leg syndrome (RLS) or sleep-disorder breathing (SDB) – there was a greater chance of sleepwalking. The study found that children with chronic parasomnias may often also present SDB or, to a lesser extent, RLS. Furthermore, the disappearance of the parasomnias after the treatment of the SDB or RLS periodic limb movement syndrome suggests that the latter may trigger the former. The high frequency of SDB in family members of children with parasomnia provided additional evidence that SDB may manifest as parasomnias in children. Children with parasomnias are not systematically monitored during sleep, although past studies have suggested that patients with sleep terrors or sleepwalking have an elevated level of brief EEG arousals. When children receive polysomnographies, discrete patterns (e.g., nasal flow limitation, abnormal respiratory effort, bursts of high or slow EEG frequencies) should be sought; apneas are rarely found in children. Children's respiration during sleep should be monitored with nasal cannula or pressure transducer system or esophageal manometry, which are more sensitive than the thermistors or thermocouples currently used in many laboratories. The clear, prompt improvement of severe parasomnia in children who are treated for SDB, as defined here, provides important evidence that subtle SDB can have substantial health-related significance. Also noteworthy is the report of familial presence of parasomnia. Studies of twin cohorts and families with sleep terror and sleepwalking suggest genetic involvement of parasomnias. RLS and SDB have been shown to have familial recurrence. RLS has been shown to have genetic involvement.

Sleepwalking may also accompany the related phenomenon of night terrors, especially in children. In the midst of a night terror, the affected person may wander in a distressed state while still asleep, and examples of sufferers attempting to run or aggressively defend themselves during these incidents have been reported in medical literature.

In some cases, sleepwalking in adults may be a symptom of a psychological disorder. One study suggests higher levels of dissociation in adult sleepwalkers, since test subjects scored unusually high on the hysteria portion of the "Crown-Crisp Experiential Index". Another suggested that "A higher incidence [of sleepwalking events] has been reported in patients with schizophrenia, hysteria and anxiety neuroses". Also, patients with migraine headaches or Tourette syndrome are 4–6 times more likely to sleepwalk.

=== Consequences ===
During the amnesic state sleepwalkers are in, many things can happen without their recollection. One thing that can happen is a sleep disorder called sexsomnia, where an individual can engage in sexual behaviors with oneself or others. Its occurrence is rare, but can happen during sleepwalking. Sleep-related eating disorder, in which sleepwalkers eat involuntarily, can also happen. The events can include eating/drinking regular foods or odd combinations of food. Insomnia and daytime sleepiness can also occur. Most sleepwalkers get injuries at some point during sleepwalking, often minor injuries such as cuts or bruises. In rare occasions, however, sleepwalkers have fractured bones and died as the result of a fall. Sleepwalkers may also face embarrassment of being found naked in public.

== Causes ==
The cause of sleepwalking is unknown. A number of, as yet unproven, hypotheses are suggested for why it may occur, including: delay in the maturity of the central nervous system, increased slow wave sleep, sleep deprivation, fever, and excessive tiredness. There may be a genetic component to sleepwalking. One study found that sleepwalking occurred in 45% of children who have one parent who sleepwalked, and in 60% of children if both parents sleepwalked. Thus, heritable factors may predispose an individual to sleepwalking, but expression of the behavior may also be influenced by environmental factors. Genetic studies using common fruit flies as experimental models reveal a link between night sleep and brain development mediated by evolutionary conserved transcription factors such as AP-2. Sleepwalking may be inherited as an autosomal dominant disorder with reduced penetrance. Genome-wide multipoint parametric linkage analysis for sleepwalking revealed a maximum logarithm of the odds score of 3.14 at chromosome 20q12-q13.12 between 55.6 and 61.4 cM.

Sleepwalking has been hypothesized to be linked to the neurotransmitter serotonin, which also appears to be metabolized differently in migraine patients and people with Tourette syndrome, both populations being four to nine times more likely to experience an episode of sleepwalking. Hormonal fluctuations have been found to contribute to sleepwalking episodes in women, with the likeliness to sleepwalk being higher before the onset of menstruation. It also appears that hormonal changes during pregnancy decrease the likelihood of engaging in sleepwalking.

Medications, primarily in four classes—benzodiazepine receptor agonists and other GABA modulators, antidepressants and other serotonergic agents, antipsychotics, and β-blockers—have been associated with sleepwalking. The best evidence of medications causing sleepwalking is for zolpidem and sodium oxybate; all other reports are based on associations noted in case reports.

A number of conditions, such as Parkinson's disease, are thought to trigger sleepwalking in people without a previous history of sleepwalking.

== Diagnosis ==
Polysomnography, a sleep study, is the only accurate assessment of a sleepwalking episode. Because this is costly and sleepwalking episodes are usually infrequent, other measures commonly used include self-, parent-, or partner-report. Three common diagnostic systems that are generally used for sleepwalking disorders are International Classification of Diseases (ICD-11), the International Classification of Sleep Disorders (ICSD-3-TR), and the Diagnostic and Statistical Manual (DSM-5-TR).

The Diagnostic and Statistical Manual defines two subcategories of sleepwalking, although sleepwalking does not need to involve either behaviours:

- sleepwalking with sleep-related eating.
- sleepwalking with sleep-related sexual behavior (sexsomnia).

Sleep eating involves consuming food while asleep. These sleep eating disorders are more often than not induced for stress related reasons. Another major cause of this sleep eating subtype of sleepwalking is sleep medication, such as Ambien for example (Mayo Clinic). There are a few others, but Ambien is a more widely used sleep aid. Because many sleep eaters prepare the food they consume, there are risks involving burns and such with ovens and other appliances. As expected, weight gain is also a common outcome of this disorder because food that is frequently consumed contains high carbohydrates. As with sleepwalking, there are ways that sleep eating disorders can be maintained. There are some medications that calm the sleeper so they can get longer and better-quality rest, but activities such as yoga can also be introduced to reduce the stress and anxiety causing the action.

=== Differential diagnoses ===
Sleepwalking should not be confused with alcohol- or drug-induced blackouts, which can result in amnesia for events similar to sleepwalking. During an alcohol-induced blackout (drug-related amnesia), a person is able to actively engage and respond to their environment (e.g., having conversations or driving a vehicle), however the brain does not create memories for the events. Alcohol-induced blackouts can occur with blood alcohol levels higher than 0.06 g/dl. A systematic review of the literature found that approximately 50% of drinkers have experienced memory loss during a drinking episode and have had associated negative consequences similar to sleepwalkers, including injury and death.

Other differential diagnoses include rapid eye movement sleep behavior disorder, confusional arousals, and night terrors.

=== Assessment ===
An assessment of sleepwalking via polysomnography poses the problem that sleepwalking is less likely to occur in the sleep laboratory, and if an episode occurs, it is usually less complex than what the patient experiences at home. Therefore, the diagnosis can often be made by assessment of sleep history, time-course and content of the sleep related behaviors. Sometimes, home videos can provide additional information and should be considered in the diagnostic process.

Some features that should always be assessed include:

- Age of onset
- When the episode occurs during the sleep period
- How often these episodes occur (frequency) and how long they last (duration)
- Description of the episode, including behavior, emotions, and thoughts during and after the event
- How responsive the patient is to external stimuli during the episode
- How conscious or aware the patient is, when awakened from an episode
- If the episode is remembered afterwards
- The triggers or precipitating factors
- Sleep–wake pattern and sleep environment
- Daytime sleepiness
- Other sleep disorders that might be present
- Family history for NREM parasomnias and other sleep disorders
- Medical, psychiatric, and neurological history
- Medication and substance use history

The assessment should rule out differential diagnoses.

== Treatment ==
There have been no clinical trials to show that any psychological or pharmacological intervention is effective in preventing sleepwalking episodes. Despite this, a wide range of treatments have been used with sleepwalkers. Psychological interventions have included psychoanalysis, hypnosis, scheduled or anticipatory waking, assertion training, relaxation training, managing aggressive feelings, sleep hygiene, classical conditioning (including electric shock), and play therapy. Pharmacological treatments have included tricyclic antidepressants (imipramine), an anticholinergic (biperiden), antiepileptics (carbamazepine, valproate), an antipsychotic (quetiapine), benzodiazepines (clonazepam, diazepam, flurazepam and triazolam), melatonin, a selective serotonin reuptake inhibitor (paroxetine), a barbiturate (sodium amytal) and herbs.

There is no evidence to show that waking a sleepwalker is harmful or not, though the sleepwalker is likely to be disoriented if awakened.

Unlike other sleep disorders, sleepwalking is not associated with daytime behavioral or emotional problems. This may be because the sleepwalker's sleep is not disturbed—unless they are woken, they are still in a sleep state while sleepwalking.

Maintaining the safety of the sleepwalker and others and seeking treatment for other sleep problems is recommended. Reassurance is recommended if sleepwalking is not causing any problems. However, if it causes distress or there is risk of harm, hypnosis and scheduled waking are recommended as treatments.

=== Safety planning ===
For those whose sleepwalking episodes are hazardous, a door alarm may offer a measure of protection. There are various kinds of door alarms that can attach to a bedroom door and when the door is opened, the alarm sounds. The intention is that the sound will fully awaken the person and interrupt the sleepwalking episode, or if the sleepwalker lives with others, the sound will prompt them to check on the person.

Sleepwalkers should aim to have their bedrooms on the ground floor of a home, apartment, dorm, hotel, etc.

Sleepwalkers should not have easily accessible weapons (loaded guns, knives) in the bedroom or any room of the house for that matter. If there are weapons, they should be locked away with keys secluded from the sleepwalker.

For partners of sleepwalkers who are violent or disturb their sleep, sleeping in another room may lead to better sleep quality and quantity.

== Epidemiology ==
The lifetime prevalence of sleepwalking is estimated to be 4.6–10.3%. A meta-analysis of 51 studies, that included more than 100,000 children and adults, found that sleepwalking is more common in children with an estimated 5%, compared with 1.5% of adults, sleepwalking at least once in the previous 12 months. The rate of sleepwalking has not been found to vary across ages during childhood.

== History ==
Sleepwalking has attracted a sense of mystery, but was not seriously investigated and diagnosed until the 19th century. The German chemist and parapsychologist Baron Karl Ludwig von Reichenbach (1788–1869) made extensive studies of sleepwalkers and used his discoveries to formulate his theory of the Odic force. Dr. John William Polidori, author of The Vampyre, wrote his dissertation on sleepwalking.

Sleepwalking was initially thought to be a dreamer acting out a dream. For example, in one study published by the Society for Science & the Public in 1954, this was the conclusion: "Repression of hostile feelings against the father caused the patients to react by acting out in a dream world with sleepwalking, the distorted fantasies they had about all authoritarian figures, such as fathers, officers and stern superiors." This same group published an article twelve years later with a new conclusion: "Sleepwalking, contrary to most belief, apparently has little to do with dreaming. In fact, it occurs when the sleeper is enjoying his most oblivious, deepest sleep—a stage in which dreams are not usually reported." More recent research has discovered that sleepwalking is actually a disorder of NREM (non-rapid eye movement) arousal. Acting out a dream is the basis for a REM (rapid eye movement) sleep disorder called REM Behavior Disorder (or REM Sleep Behavior Disorder). More accurate data about sleep is due to the invention of technologies, such as the electroencephalogram (EEG) by Hans Berger in 1924 and BEAM by Frank Duffy in the early 1980s.

In 1907, Sigmund Freud spoke about sleepwalking to the Vienna Psychoanalytic Society (Nunberg and Federn). He believed that sleepwalking was connected to fulfilling sexual wishes and was surprised that a person could move without interrupting their dream. At that time, Freud suggested that the essence of this phenomenon was the desire to go to sleep in the same area as the individual had slept in childhood. Ten years later, he speculated about somnambulism in the article "A Metapsychological Supplement to the Theory of Dreams" (1916–17 [1915]). In this essay, he clarified and expanded his hypothetical ideas on dreams. He described the dream as a fragile equilibrium that is destabilized by the repressed unconscious impulses of the unconscious system, which does not obey the wishes of the ego. Certain preconscious daytime thoughts can be resistant and these can retain a part of their cathexis as well. Unconscious impulses and day residues can come together and result in a conflict. Freud then wondered about the outcome of this wishful impulse: an unconscious instinctual demand that becomes a dream wish in the preconscious. Freud stated that this unconscious impulse could be expressed as mobility during sleep. This would be what is observed in somnambulism, though what actually makes it possible remains unknown.

As of 2002, sleepwalking has not been detected in non-human primates. It is unclear whether it simply has not been observed yet, or whether sleepwalking is a uniquely human phenomenon.

== Culture ==
=== Opera ===
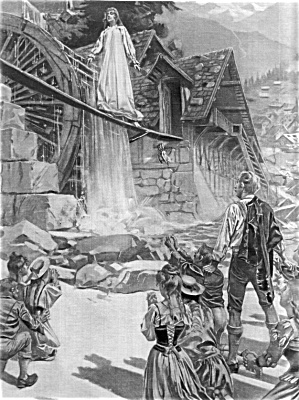
Amina, the somnabuliste, at the mill

Vincenzo Bellini's 1831 Italian opera semiseria, La sonnambula, the plot of which is centered on the question of the innocence of the betrothed and soon-to-be married Amina, who, upon having been discovered in the bedchamber of a stranger, and despite the assurances of that stranger that Amina was entirely innocent, has been rejected by her enraged fiancé, Elvino — who then decides to marry another. In fact, when stressed, Amina was susceptible to somnambulism; and had come to be in the stranger's bedchamber by sleep-walking along a high parapet (in full view of the opera's audience). Elvino, who later observes the (exhausted by all the fuss) Amina, sleep-walking across a very high, very unstable, and very rickety bridge at the local mill, realizes his mistake, abandons his plans of marriage to the other woman, and re-unites with Amina.

=== Drama ===
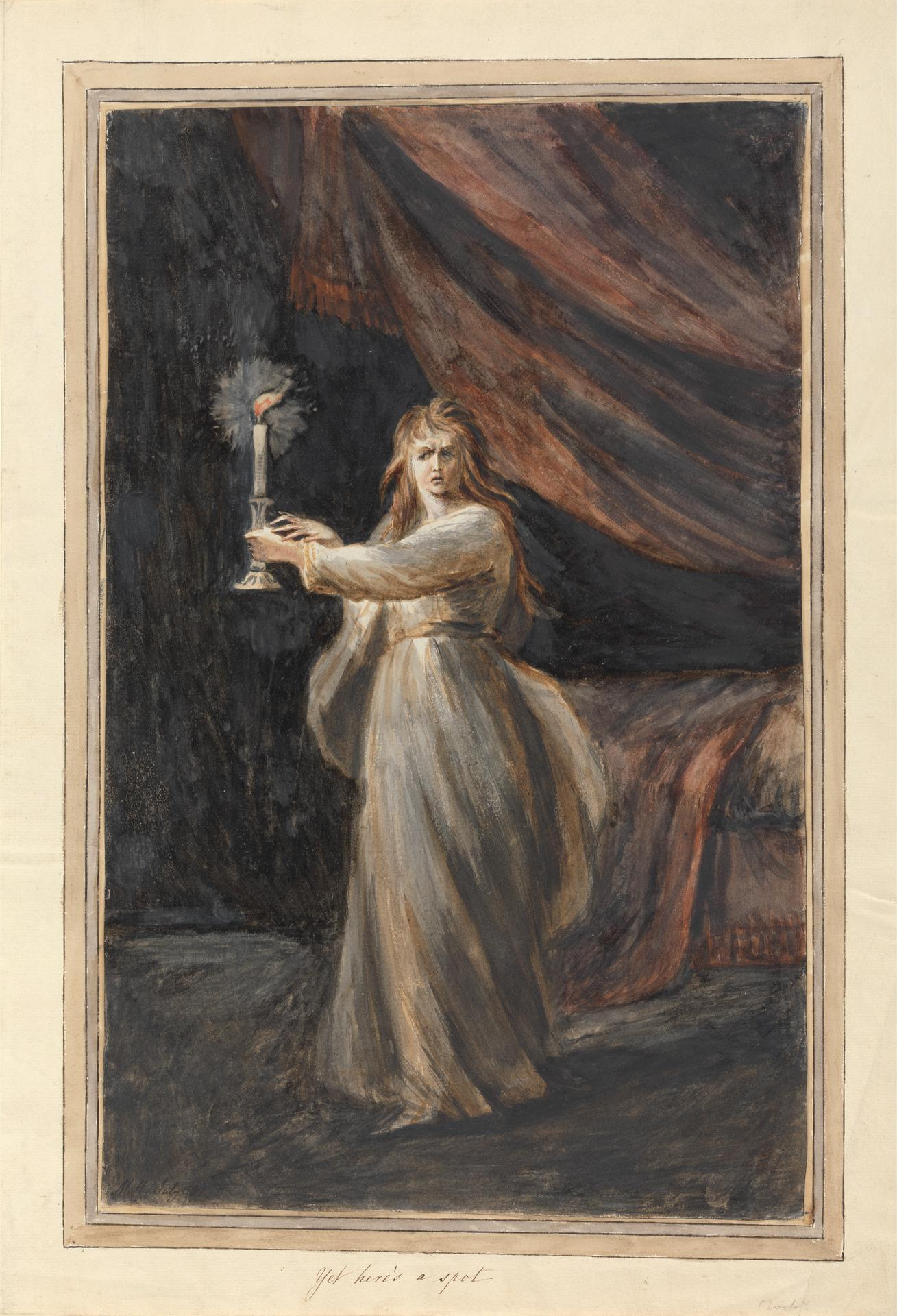
Mary Hoare's painting Lady Macbeth, Sleepwalking

- The sleepwalking scene (Act V Scene 1) from William Shakespeare's tragic play Macbeth (1606) is one of the most famous scenes in all of literature.
- In Walley Chamberlain Oulton's two act farce The Sleep-Walker; or, Which is the Lady (1812), "Somno", a histrionic failed-actor-turned-manservant relives his wished-for roles when sleepwalking.

=== Literature ===
- In Bram Stoker's novel Dracula, the character Lucy Westenra is described as a sleepwalker. It is while she is sleepwalking that Count Dracula lures and attacks her.
- In Thomas Hardy's novel Tess of the d'Urbervilles, the character Angel Clare sleepwalks and carries Tess to an empty coffin during his estrangement from her.

== Sleepwalking as a legal defense ==
As sleepwalking behaviours occur without volition, sleepwalking can be used as a legal defense, as a form of legal automatism. An individual can be accused of non-insane or insane automatism. The first is used as a defense for temporary insanity or involuntary conduct, resulting in acquittal. The latter results in a "special verdict of not guilty by reason of insanity." This verdict of insanity can result in a court order to attend a mental institution.

In the 1963 case Bratty v A-G for Northern Ireland, Lord Morris stated, "Each set of facts must require a careful examination of its own circumstances, but if by way of taking an illustration it were considered possible for a person to walk in his sleep and to commit a violent crime while genuinely unconscious, then such a person would not be criminally liable for that act." While the veracity of the cases are disputed, there have been acts of homicide where the prime suspect may have committed the act while sleepwalking.

Alternative explanations to homicidal or violent sleepwalking include malingering, drug-induced amnesia, and other disorders in which sleep-related violence may occur, such as REM behavior disorder, fugue states, and episodic wandering.

Sleep driving, also known as sleepwalk driving, is a rare phenomenon where the person drives a motor vehicle while they are sleepwalking. If stopped by police, sleepwalk-drivers are totally incapable of having any interaction with the police, if they are still sleepwalking during the event. Sleepwalk-driving can occur to people who normally don't experience sleepwalking, since some medications, especially zolpidem and eszopiclone, can cause sleepwalking as unwanted side effect. A case of a fatal hit-and-run accident involving the driver claiming to be sleep-driving has been recorded. However, no evidence of the claims could be found by a sleep expert during the following trial.

=== Historical cases ===
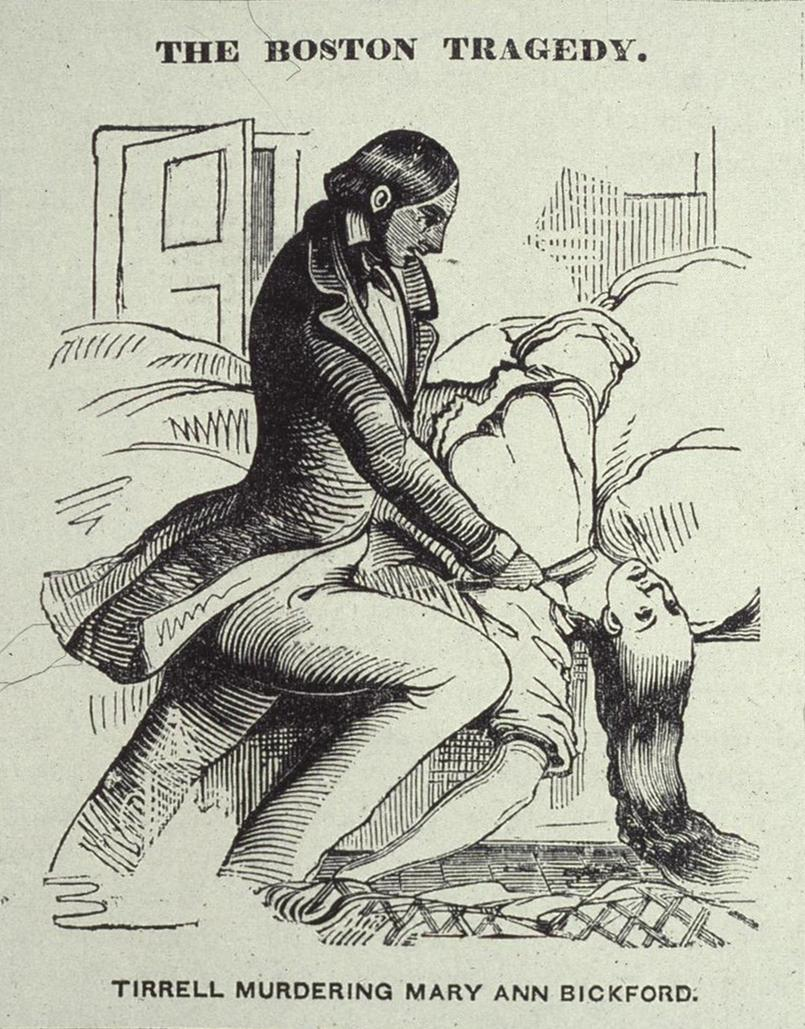
Albert Tirrell was acquitted of the murder of Maria Bickford in 1846, under a defense that he was sleepwalking. (National Police Gazette, 1846)

- 1846, Albert Tirrell used sleepwalking as a defense against charges of murdering Maria Bickford, a prostitute living in a Boston brothel.
- 1961, Sergeant Willis Boshears confessed to strangling a local woman named Jean Constable in the early hours on New Years Day 1961, but claimed that he was asleep and only woke to realize what he had done. He pled not guilty on the basis of being asleep at the time he committed the offence and was acquitted.
- In 1981, Steven Steinberg of Scottsdale, Arizona was accused of killing his wife and acquitted on the grounds of temporary insanity.
- 1991, R v Burgess: Burgess was accused of hitting his girlfriend on the head with a wine bottle and then a video tape recorder. He was found not guilty at Bristol Crown Court, by reason of insane automatism.
- 1992, R. v. Parks: Parks was accused of killing his mother-in-law and attempting to kill his father-in-law. He was acquitted by the Supreme Court of Canada.
- 1994, Pennsylvania v. Ricksgers: Ricksgers was accused of killing his wife. He was sentenced to life in prison without parole.
- 1999, Arizona v. Falater: Scott Falater, of Phoenix, Arizona, was accused of killing his wife. The court concluded that the murder was too complex to be committed while sleepwalking. Falater was convicted of first-degree murder and sentenced to life with no possibility of parole.
- 2001, California v. Reitz: Stephen Reitz killed his lover, Eva Weinfurtner. He told police he had no recollection of the attack but he had "flashbacks" of believing he was in a scuffle with a male intruder. His parents testified in court that he had been a sleepwalker from childhood. The court convicted Reitz of first-degree murder in 2004.
- 2001, Antonio Nieto murdered his wife and mother-in-law and attempted to murder his daughter and son, before being disarmed. Nieto claimed to have been asleep during the attack and dreaming that he was defending himself against aggressive ostriches. However, his children stated that he had recognized them and had told his son to not turn on the lights because their mother (gravely injured already) was sleeping. In 2007, Nieto was sentenced to 10 years internment in a psychiatric hospital and ordered to pay 171,100 euros as compensation to the victims.
- 2004, Jules Lowe confessed to causing the death of his father Edward but did not remember committing the act. Jules used automatism as his defense, and was found not guilty by reason of insanity and detained indefinitely in a secure hospital. He was released after ten months.
- 2008, Brian Thomas was accused of killing his wife while dreaming that he was fighting off intruders. He was freed in 2009 by a judge, who found him not guilty of murder.

== See also ==
- Rapid eye movement sleep behavior disorder
- Jenny Lind and James Braid
- Sleep emailing

== General and cited references ==
- Walker, N. (1968). Crime and Insanity in England Volume One: The Historical Perspective. Edinburgh: Edinburgh University Press. ISBN 9780852242285 (reprint). LCCN 68-19882. OCLC 1148594530.
