= Fred Hawkes =

English footballer

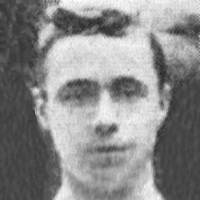

Personal information
- Full name: Frederick Hawkes
- Date of birth: 17 April 1881
- Place of birth: Luton, England
- Date of death: 1952
- Height: 5 ft 6 in (1.68 m)
- Position: Midfielder

Youth career
- Luton Stanley

Senior career*
Years	Team	Apps	(Gls)
1899–1920	Luton Town	509	(22)
- * Club domestic league appearances and goals

Frederick Hawkes (born 17 April 1881) was an English footballer who spent his entire career playing for his home-town club, Luton Town.

== Career ==
Following a successful youth career in Luton, Hawkes received offers from other League clubs before signing for his local side Luton Town in 1899. Playing alongside Robert Hawkes (no relation) and Fred White in the Luton half-back line, Hawkes became one of the club's most consistent performers up until the outbreak of World War I. On his return from the conflict, he made 14 appearances during the 1919–20 season to complete a career that had lasted for over twenty years.
