= George Harford =

English footballer

Personal information
- Full name: George Balloch Harford
- Date of birth: 1902
- Place of birth: Woolwich, England
- Date of death: 24th December 1979 Chorley
- Position: Goalkeeper

Senior career*
Years	Team	Apps	(Gls)
1924–1925	Dover United		
1925–1926	Erith & Belvedere		
1926–1927	Bexleyheath		
1927–1929	Millwall	57	(0)
1929–1934	Luton Town	99	(0)
1935–1936	Carlisle United	26	(0)
1936	Rhyl		
Total		182	(0)
- * Club domestic league appearances and goals

George Balloch Harford (1902–unknown) was an English footballer who played in the Football League for Carlisle United, Luton Town and Millwall.
