= Herbert Moody =

English footballer

Personal information
- Date of birth: 1880
- Place of birth: Luton, England
- Date of death: 1959 (aged 78–79)
- Height: 5 ft 9 in (1.75 m)
- Position: Forward

Youth career
- Luton Stanley

Senior career*
Years	Team	Apps	(Gls)
1901–1905	Luton Town	63	(15)
1905–1907	Leicester Fosse	54	(11)
1907–1912	Luton Town	169	(78)
1912–1914	Millwall		
- * Club domestic league appearances and goals

Herbert Moody (born 1880 in Luton) was an English footballer.

== Career ==
After signing with home-town club Luton Town in 1901, Moody scored 15 league goals in 63 matches before moving on to Leicester Fosse in 1905. Returning to Luton two years later, Moody scored another 78 league goals in 169 games before leaving in 1912 to join Millwall. According to the List of Luton Town F.C. records and statistics Herbert Moody is the 5th highest goal scorer of all time for Luton Town FC with 104 goals in 247 appearances. Notable performances in the Southern League Division One in 1912 include scoring a hat-trick in a 7–1 defeat of Reading and scoring both goals in a 2–1 defeat of West Ham United.
