= Bob Graham (footballer, born August 1900) =

Scottish footballer (1900–1965)

Personal information
- Full name: Robert Currie Graham
- Date of birth: 25 August 1900
- Place of birth: Muirkirk, Scotland
- Date of death: 1965 (aged 64–65)
- Position: Full-back

Senior career*
Years	Team	Apps	(Gls)
1920–1921	Kilwinning Rangers		
1921–1929	Luton Town	164	(5)
1929–1931	Norwich City	50	(0)
1931–1932	Thames	30	(0)
1932–1933	Bedford Town		
1933	Luton Davis Athletic		
Total		244	(5)
- * Club domestic league appearances and goals

Robert Currie Graham (25 August 1900 – 1965) was a Scottish footballer who played in the Football League for Luton Town, Norwich City and Thames.
