= Albert Tirrell =

American criminal (1824–1880)

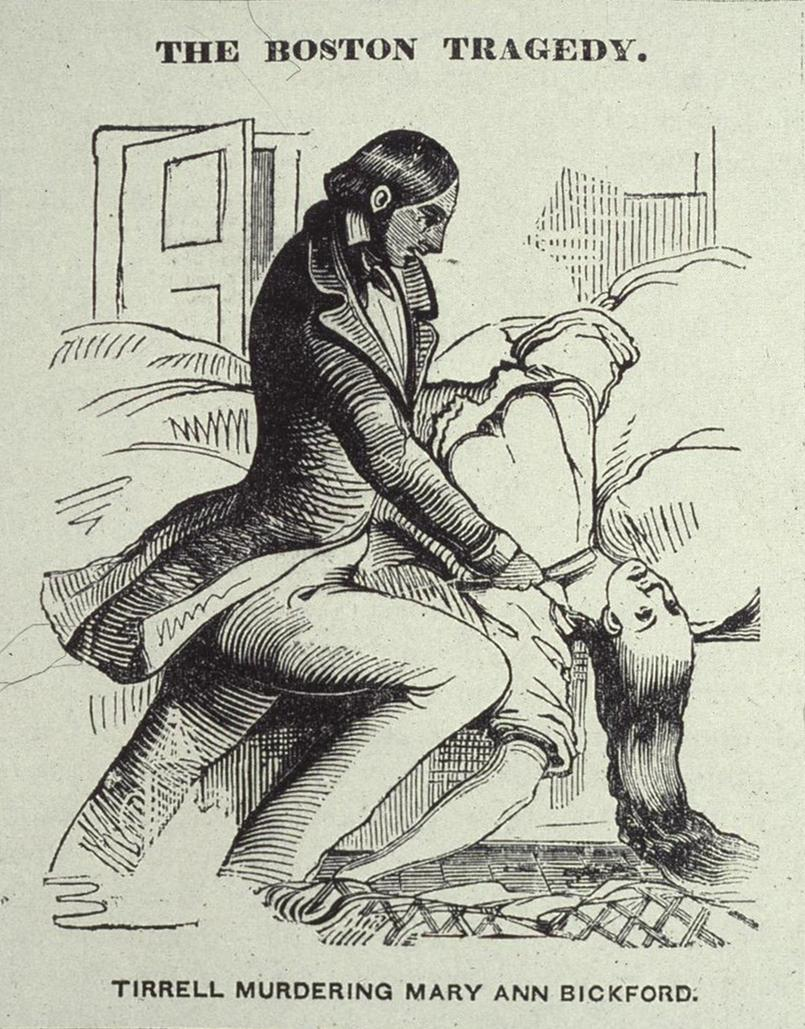
"The Boston Tragedy", the murder of Maria Bickford, 1846; Tirrell was acquitted because of "sleepwalking". National Police Gazette, 1846

Albert Jackson Tirrell (1824–1880) was a man whose trial for the murder of the prostitute for whom he had left his wife scandalized Boston society in 1846. He used sleepwalking as a defense against charges of murder, marking the first time in American legal history that this defense was successful in a murder prosecution.

== Background ==
Tirrell was the son of a family in Weymouth, Massachusetts, married and living with his wife and two children. He was known to be unfaithful, and in 1845 he left his wife to be with Maria Bickford (also married and also in her early 20s), a prostitute living in a Boston brothel. Tirrell fell in love with her, his affection was returned and they became constant companions, living together as husband and wife. Although they were constantly together and traveled together using different names, she never abandoned her profession, much to his dislike.

Early one morning, after loud noises emanating from her rooms, Bickford was found brutally murdered. Tirrell, having last been seen with her, was accused of her murder. His parents hired Rufus Choate, a famous Boston attorney who was noted for the innovative defense strategies he employed to acquit his clients.

== Circumstances ==
On October 27, 1845, Tirrell was alleged to have visited Bickford's bedroom after that evening's last customer had left and, using a razor, slit her throat from ear to ear, so brutally that her head was nearly severed from her body. He also allegedly set three fires in the brothel, which awakened the owner, who discovered the body of Bickford and called the police. As several people had witnessed the entrance and leaving of the brothel by Tirrell, the police began a search but Tirrell had fled. He was arrested on December 6 in New Orleans, Louisiana, and returned to Boston for trial.

Public outrage was fed by sensational newspaper accounts describing the evidence against Tirrell. Not only had he left his wife to live with Bickford and was under a charge of adultery, he had been seen on the premises in the hours before the body was found. A bloody razor lay near her body, bits of Tirrell's clothing and his cane were at the crime scene, and fires had been set nearby as if to destroy evidence.

== Trial ==
Although many witnesses could testify to Tirrell's affair with Bickford and to the presence of Tirrell at the brothel that evening, there were no eyewitnesses to the actual crime. Choate emphasized to the jury that no matter how overwhelming the evidence of Tirrell's presence at the brothel that evening, the evidence was all circumstantial, as no one had seen Tirrell kill Bickford. Moreover, Choate argued, Tirrell had no motive to kill Bickford.

Choate set forth two possible explanations for the jury to consider. The first was that Bickford could have committed suicide, that there was no proof that she did not "in the frenzy of the moment, with giant strength, let out the scream of life..." However, the brutality of the slashing made this explanation implausible, so Choate turned to an alternative explanation, that Tirrell, as a habitual sleepwalker, could have murdered Bickford under the influence of a nightmare or a trance. In the 1840s there were no medical explanations for sleepwalking and medical experts differed over its cause. With oratorial flourish, Choate read to the jury popular treatises with descriptions of violence attributed to sleepwalking, while reminding them that if they returned a guilty verdict, Tirrell would certainly be executed even if there existed a remote chance that he was innocent. Meanwhile, the Boston newspapers sensationalized the trial, arguing that Tirrell was guilty.

After less than two hours of deliberation, on March 30, 1846, the jury returned its verdict of not guilty.

== Significance ==
Rufus Choate convinced the jury that Tirrell did not cut Bickford's throat, or, if he did so, he did it while sleepwalking, under the 'insanity of sleep.' Choate successfully used the same 'insanity of sleep' defense in a second trial to acquit Tirrell on the arson charges for setting fire to the brothel. These acquittals were the first in the history of American law in which sleepwalking was successfully used as a defense.

== Follow-up ==
After being acquitted, Tirrell attempted unsuccessfully to get half of Choate's legal fees refunded on the grounds that his innocence had been obvious. After the notoriety generated by these trials died down, Tirrell lived the remainder of his life in obscurity. Nonetheless, the trials became famous for Choate's successful use of the sleepwalking defense.
