= Reg Kingham =

English footballer

Personal information
- Full name: Henry Ronald Kingham
- Date of birth: 19 November 1904
- Place of birth: Harpenden, England
- Date of death: 4 August 1948 (aged 43)
- Place of death: Luton, England
- Height: 5 ft 11 in (1.80 m)
- Position: Defender

Senior career*
Years	Team	Apps	(Gls)
–1926	St Albans City		
1926–1937	Luton Town	250	(0)
1937–	Yeovil & Petters United		
- Worcester City
- * Club domestic league appearances and goals

Henry Ronald "Reg" Kingham (19 November 1904 – 4 August 1948) was an English footballer best known as a player for Luton Town.

== Career ==
Born in Harpenden, Kingham joined his local side Luton Town from St Albans City in 1926. After playing 275 matches for Luton, Kingham left in 1937 to join Yeovil & Petters United. After Yeovil, Kingham had a spell with Worcester City before ending his career.

== Later life ==
Kingham later became the groundsman for Vauxhall Motors Recreation Club. He died following a spinal illness, aged 43.
