= Bob Hawks (Tennessee politician) =

American politician (1926–2004)

Member of the Tennessee House of Representatives from the 16th district
- In office 1967–1972

Personal details
- Born: Robert Edward Hawks; August 1, 1926 Memphis, Tennessee, U.S.
- Died: January 31, 2004 (aged 77) Memphis, Tennessee, U.S.
- Party: Democratic
- Occupation: moving man

Robert Edward Hawks (August 1, 1926 – January 31, 2004) was an American politician in the state of Tennessee.

== Life and career ==
Robert Edward Hawks was born in Memphis, Tennessee on August 1, 1926. He served in the Tennessee House of Representatives from 1967 to 1972. A Democrat, he represented Shelby County, Tennessee (District 16) and owned a moving company, Bob Hawks Movers, Inc.

Hawks died in Memphis on January 31, 2004, at the age of 77.
