= Ron Baynham =

English footballer (1929–2024)

Personal information
- Full name: Ronald Leslie Baynham
- Date of birth: 10 June 1929
- Place of birth: Erdington, Birmingham, Warwickshire, England
- Date of death: 18 March 2024 (aged 94)
- Height: 6 ft 1 in (1.85 m)
- Position: Goalkeeper

Senior career*
Years	Team	Apps	(Gls)
1946–194?	Erdington Rovers		
194?–1949	Bromford Amateurs		
1949–1951	Worcester City	?	(0)
1951–1965	Luton Town	388	(0)

International career
1955	England	3	(0)
- * Club domestic league appearances and goals

Ronald Leslie Baynham (10 June 1929 – 18 March 2024) was an English professional footballer who played as a goalkeeper, spending most of his career with Luton Town. He played three times for England.

== Early life ==
Baynham was born in Erdington, Birmingham, on 10 June 1929. He began playing football in his youth when he was put in goal by his brother for their local junior team.

== Club career ==
He took up goalkeeping during a spell in the army on National Service, and declined a trial with Wolverhampton Wanderers soon after, thinking himself not good enough. He joined the Bromford Amateurs upon his discharge from the army and was signed to Worcester City by manager Jack Vinall in August 1950. In November 1951, he was transferred to Luton Town in exchange for £1,000, which helped save Worcester City from financial difficulties at the time. For four years he competed with Bernard Streten for the number one shirt, but by 1955 Baynham was Luton's regular goalkeeper.

He played for Luton in the 1959 FA Cup Final in May 1959, which they lost 2–1 to Nottingham Forest. He described the loss as the "biggest disappointment" of his career. In September 1960 he suffered a skull fracture during a game against Sheffield United but resumed play.

Baynham played for the club until 1964, when he retired aged 35; he returned in a reserve game in 1965 despite injury. He made 434 appearances in all competitions for Luton Town.

== International career ==
He gained a total of three caps for England during his time at Luton, all in 1955: a 5–1 win against Denmark at the Københavns Idrætspark in Copenhagen on 2 October 1955, a 3–0 win against Northern Ireland and a 4–1 win against Spain on 30 November 1955.

No further caps followed as Baynham was overlooked in the goalkeeper position for Reg Matthews.

In 2021, the three caps won by Baynham were auctioned by a private seller and bought by Registered Charity Hatters' Heritage thanks to donations from Luton Town directors with the intention of displaying them at Kenilworth Road and at a planned museum at Power Court.

== Later life and death ==
Baynham later worked as a painter and decorator and at Luton Airport, before retiring to the village of Silsoe, Bedfordshire. In 2020, he was voted by Luton Town supporters as their best ever goalkeeper.

He died on 18 March 2024, at the age of 94. At the time of his death he was the oldest surviving England player.

== Honours ==
Luton Town

- FA Cup runner-up: 1958–59
