= Bernard Streten =

English footballer (1921–1994)

Personal information
- Full name: Bernard Reginald Streten
- Date of birth: 14 January 1921
- Place of birth: Gillingham, Norfolk, England
- Date of death: 10 May 1994 (aged 73)
- Position: Goalkeeper

Senior career*
Years	Team	Apps	(Gls)
- Notts County
–1947	Shrewsbury Town		
1947–1957	Luton Town	276	(0)
1957–1959	King's Lynn		
1959–1961	Wisbech Town		
1961	Cambridge City		

International career
1949	England	1	(0)
- * Club domestic league appearances and goals

Bernard Reginald Streten (14 January 1921 – 10 May 1994) was an English international footballer who played as a goalkeeper in the 1940s and 1950s, primarily with Luton Town.

Streten joined Luton from Shrewsbury Town, and made his Luton League debut on 29 January 1947 against Nottingham Forest. He went on to play 276 League matches for the Hatters, with his final league appearance coming on 2 February 1957 versus Tottenham Hotspur.

He was capped on one occasion by the England national team, on 16 November 1949, in a 9–2 victory over Ireland.
