= Alf Tirrell =

English footballer

Personal information
- Date of birth: 7 February 1894
- Place of birth: Desborough, England
- Date of death: 29 December 1944 (aged 50)
- Place of death: Luton, England
- Position: Full back

Senior career*
Years	Team	Apps	(Gls)
- Peterborough City
1919	West Ham United	1	(0)
1920–1923	Luton Town	122	(5)
- * Club domestic league appearances and goals

Alfred Tirrell (7 February 1894 – 29 December 1944) was an English footballer who played in the Football League for Luton Town and West Ham United.
