= Bob Morton (footballer, born 1927) =

English footballer

Personal information
- Full name: Robert Hendy Morton
- Date of birth: 25 September 1927
- Place of birth: Aston Clinton, Buckinghamshire, England
- Date of death: 6 May 2002 (aged 74)
- Place of death: Luton, Bedfordshire, England
- Position: Wing half

Youth career
- 1943–1945: Waterlows
- 1945–1946: Luton Town

Senior career*
Years	Team	Apps	(Gls)
1946–1964	Luton Town	495	(48)

Managerial career
- Bletchley Town
- * Club domestic league appearances and goals

Robert Hendy Morton (25 September 1927 – 6 May 2002) was an English professional footballer who played for Luton Town. Morton holds the record for most appearances for the club, with 495 in the Football League and 550 overall.

== Playing career ==
Morton started out playing locally at Waterlows, but signed amateur forms with Luton Town as the war drew to an end. Luton signed him on a professional contract a year later, in 1946. Morton made his debut on 30 October 1948, playing at centre-forward as Luton beat West Ham United 1–0 at Upton Park.

Morton was equally good as a forward or as a wing half, and whether he was scoring goals or stopping them at the other end he was an ever-present in the Luton team. Morton left Luton in 1964, at the age of 38. He spent a spell as player-manager of Bletchley Town, before retiring altogether.

== Honours ==
Luton Town

- FA Cup runner-up: 1958–59
