= Joe Payne (footballer, born 1914) =

English footballer

Personal information
- Full name: Joseph Payne
- Date of birth: 17 January 1914
- Place of birth: Brimington Common, England
- Date of death: 22 April 1975 (aged 61)
- Place of death: Luton, England
- Height: 5 ft 10 1/2 in (1.79 m)
- Positions: Half-back; centre forward

Senior career*
Years	Team	Apps	(Gls)
- Bolsover Colliery
1934–1938	Luton Town	72	(83)
- → Biggleswade Town (loan)
1938–1945	Chelsea	36	(21)
1946–1947	West Ham United	10	(6)
1947–?	Millwall	0	(0)

International career
1937	England	1	(2)
- * Club domestic league appearances and goals

Joseph Payne (17 January 1914 – 22 April 1975) was an England international footballer, best known as the scorer of 10 goals in a match for Luton Town against Bristol Rovers on 13 April 1936. This is still a record in the English Football League. Payne later played for Chelsea and, after missing six years of his career to the Second World War, West Ham United.

== Playing career ==
1936: Payne (white shirt, left) scores one of his record-breaking 10 goals in one match

Payne was born in Brimington Common near Chesterfield, and worked as a coalminer as a teenager. He was spotted playing as a centre-forward for Bolsover Colliery and signed by Luton Town in 1934. There, he played mostly for the reserve team as a half-back, and spent time on loan to Biggleswade Town.

Payne made his League debut for Luton on 29 December 1934, against Southend United, and he made one further appearance during his initial season. The 1935–36 season saw Payne start four games as half-back, the last of which came on 21 September 1935 against Crystal Palace, and he did not play for the club again until 13 April 1936, in a match against Bristol Rovers. Due to injuries to Jack Ball and Bill Boyd, Payne was played at centre-forward and scored 10 goals, still a Football League record, in a 12–0 win. He received a £2 win bonus for the match, in addition to his £4 weekly wage. The following season, Payne scored a club record 55 goals in 39 matches as the Hatters won the Third Division South championship. In May 1937, he made his only appearance for England, scoring two goals in the 8–0 victory over Finland at the Töölön Pallokenttä.

In March 1938, he was bought by Chelsea for a large fee, reported as around £5,000. In September 1941, Payne was hospitalised with acute pneumonia. His career was interrupted by the Second World War but he continued to be a prolific scorer in wartime competitions, and played once for hometown club Chesterfield in an 8–0 win over Notts County in December 1944.

In December 1946, Payne joined West Ham United, where he made 11 appearances in his single season with the club. He then joined Millwall but he had been suffering from persistent ankle injuries and never made a League appearance.

== Death and legacy ==
Payne died in Luton on 22 April 1975, aged 61. On 13 April 2006, to mark the 70th anniversary of his 10-goal record, a plaque was unveiled by Geoff Thompson, then chairman of the Football Association, on the wall of the Miner's Arms public house in Manor Road, Brimington Common. The site is adjacent to the now-demolished house where he used to live, and overlooks a park where he played football. The unveiling was attended by two of Payne's nephews. A lounge at Kenilworth Road stadium was named in honour of Payne.
