= Fred White (footballer, born 1880) =

English footballer

Personal information
- Full name: Fred White
- Date of birth: 1880
- Place of birth: Dunstable, England
- Position: Defender

Senior career*
Years	Team	Apps	(Gls)
1900–1909	Luton Town	237	(10)
- * Club domestic league appearances and goals

Fred White (born 1880) was an English professional footballer who spent his entire career playing for his local club Luton Town.

== Career ==
Born in Dunstable, White joined Luton Town as a 20-year-old in 1900. After 257 appearances for the club over nine years, White retired in 1909.
