= Bob Hawks (Montana politician) =

American politician

Member of the Montana Senate from the 33rd district
- In office 2004 - 2012
- Succeeded by: Mike Phillips

Personal details
- Born: April 24, 1941 (age 85) Billings, Montana
- Party: Democratic Party
- Spouse: Jane
- Education: University of the Pacific
- Profession: Optometrist

Robert L. "Bob" Hawks is a former Democratic Party member of the Montana Senate. He represented District 33 from 2004 to 2012. He was unable to run for re-election in 2012 due to Montana's term limits.
