= Robert Hawkes =

English footballer (1880–1945)

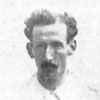
- Hawkes in 1908

Personal information
- Full name: Robert Murray Hawkes
- Date of birth: 18 October 1880
- Place of birth: Breachwood Green, England
- Date of death: 12 September 1945 (aged 64)
- Place of death: Luton, England
- Position: Winger

Youth career
- 1900–1901: Luton Town

Senior career*
Years	Team	Apps	(Gls)
1901–1920	Luton Town	349	(40)

International career
1907–1908	England	5	(0)
1908	England (amateur)	3	(2)
Medal record
Men's football
Representing Great Britain
Olympic Games
Gold medal – first place	1908 London	Team competition
- * Club domestic league appearances and goals

Robert Murray Hawkes (18 October 1880 – 12 September 1945) was an English footballer who played for Luton Town, became their first international player, and competed in the 1908 Summer Olympics.

== Playing career ==
Hawkes joined his local team Luton Town as an amateur in 1900, while working in the hat trade, which was prominent in the town. Such was his quality that he was a member of the English team that won the gold medal in the football tournament at the 1908 London Olympics. Meanwhile, he had become the captain of Luton Town.

He also made five appearances for the full England team, making his debut against Ireland on 16 February 1907. In 1908 he was a member of the England squad who toured Europe for the first time, making four appearances in the space of seven days against Austria (twice), Hungary and Bohemia; all four matches resulted in comfortable victories for England.

He was courted numerous times by clubs from the Football League, but always remained loyal to his roots at Luton, turning professional in 1911. He stayed with Luton until his retirement as a 39-year-old in 1920, when Luton rejoined the League themselves.
