= 1999–2000 Colchester United F.C. season =

Colchester United
1999–2000 season
- Chairman: Peter Heard
- Manager: Mick Wadsworth (until 25 August); Steve Whitton (from 25 August)
- Stadium: Layer Road
- Second Division: 18th
- FA Cup: 1st round (eliminated by Swansea City)
- League Cup: 1st round (eliminated by Crystal Palace)
- Football League Trophy: 1st round (southern section) (eliminated by Swansea City)
- Top goalscorer: League: Steve McGavin (16); All: Steve McGavin (16)
- Highest home attendance: 6,194 v Burnley, 26 February 2000
- Lowest home attendance: 2,557 v Cardiff City, 23 November 1999
- Average home league attendance: 3,801
- Biggest win: 3–0 v Luton Town, 17 December 1999
- Biggest defeat: 0–4 v AFC Bournemouth, 21 August 1999
Home colours

The 1999–2000 season was Colchester United's 58th season in their history and their second successive season in the third tier of English football, the Second Division. Alongside competing in the Second Division, the club also participated in the FA Cup, the League Cup and the Football League Trophy.

Following of a rocky first season back in the third tier, Colchester had an equally unharmonious beginning to the 1999–2000 season, with managing director Steve Gage resigning, shortly followed by manager Mick Wadsworth. Former player, caretaker manager and assistant manager Steve Whitton was appointed Wadsworth's replacement. It was a season of much change but little progress, as the U's stuttered to another 18th-placed finish, despite a strong start to the new Millennium.

Colchester suffered first round exits once more in all three cup competitions after Crystal Palace beat the U's 5–3 over two legs in the League Cup, and Swansea City dumped them out of the FA Cup and Football League Trophy.

== Season overview ==
Mick Wadsworth made swingeing cuts to the playing staff in the close season as nine first-team regulars were allowed to leave, including fan favourites Joe Dunne and Tony Adcock, who fell just four goals short of Martyn King's club record of 131 career league goals.

Despite the numerous changes, all was not well behind the scenes at Colchester United. Managing director Steven Gage resigned on the eve of the new season, and within two weeks of the season starting, Wadsworth had also resigned to join Crystal Palace. Wadsworth had brought in a number of highly paid players, most of whom were linked to controversial football agent Barry Silkman. When Brian Launders was sacked by the club for gross misconduct, Silkman took Colchester United to court, exposing the influence agents had on the game and confirming Steve Wignall statements regarding agents following his resignation the season prior. As a result, U's chairman Peter Heard invoked a policy of no longer dealing with agents.

Steve Whitton was appointed Wadsworth's replacement after serving as caretaker manager and having been Wadsworth's assistant. By October, the Colchester were bottom of the league following a dismal run of one win in eleven games, including a 5–2 defeat by Cambridge United. Whitton reinstated ostracised players such as Tony Lock and Richard Wilkins and re-signed Joe Dunne and Steve McGavin. He led the U's to safety with an 18th position finish, as Steve McGavin registered 16 goals for himself, while Lomana LuaLua emerged as a future star with 14 goals to his name.

In the cup competitions, Colchester exited all three at the first round stage. Swansea City defeated the U's in the FA Cup and Football League Trophy, while Wadsworth's then-future club Crystal Palace saw off Colchester 5–3 on aggregate in the League Cup.

== Players ==
As of match played 6 May 2000.

No.	Name	Position	Nationality	Place of birth	Date of birth	Apps	Goals	Signed from	Date signed	Fee
Goalkeepers
1	Simon Brown	GK	(England)	Chelmsford	3 December 1976 (aged 22)	0	0	(England) Tottenham Hotspur	20 July 1999	Free transfer
26	Glenn Williamson	GK	(England)	Enfield Town	22 December 1982 (aged 16)	0	0	Youth team	1 August 1999	Free transfer
Defenders
3	Joe Keith	FB	(England)	Plaistow	1 October 1978 (aged 20)	0	0	(England) West Ham United	24 May 1999	Free transfer
5	David Greene	CB	(Republic of Ireland)	(England) Luton	26 October 1973 (aged 25)	164	17	(England) Luton Town	21 June 1996	£30,000
6	Joe Dunne	FB	(Republic of Ireland)	Dublin	25 May 1973 (aged 26)	119	4	(England) Dover Athletic	7 December 1999 (Note: Date of signing refers to the date of the player's first game in his second spell for the club)	Nominal
21	Craig Farley	CB	(England)	Oxford	17 March 1981 (aged 18)	0	0	(England) Watford	6 May 1999	Free transfer
24	Ross Johnson	CB	(England)	Brighton	2 January 1976 (aged 23)	6	0	(England) Brighton & Hove Albion	14 February 2000	Free transfer
28	Sean Hillier	DF	(England)	Clacton-on-Sea	11 September 1981 (aged 17)	0	0	Youth team	1 August 1998	Free transfer
31	Jack Wignall	CB	(England)	Colchester	26 September 1981 (aged 17)	0	0	Youth team	1 August 1999	Free transfer
32	Andy Taylor	FB	(England)	Oldham	14 January 1981 (aged 18)	0	0	Youth team	Summer 1999	Free transfer
Midfielders
4	Gavin Johnson	MF	(England)	Eye	10 October 1970 (aged 28)	0	0	(Scotland) Dunfermline Athletic	14 November 1999	Free transfer
7	Karl Duguid	MF	(England)	Letchworth	21 March 1978 (aged 21)	105	11	Youth team	9 December 1995 (Note: Date of signing refers to the date of the player's first game for the club)	Free transfer
8	David Gregory	MF	(England)	Sudbury	23 January 1970 (aged 29)	160	25	(England) Peterborough United	8 December 1995	Free transfer
11	Jason Dozzell	MF	(England)	Ipswich	9 December 1967 (aged 31)	31	4	(England) Northampton Town	15 October 1998	Non-contract
18	Chris Keeble	MF	(England)	Colchester	17 September 1978 (aged 20)	0	0	(England) Ipswich Town	23 March 2000	Free transfer
20	Thomas Pinault	MF	(France)	Grasse	4 December 1981 (aged 17)	0	0	(France) AS Cannes	1 July 1999	Free transfer
23	Aaron Skelton	MF/DF	(England)	Welwyn Garden City	22 November 1974 (aged 24)	57	7	(England) Luton Town	3 July 1997	Free transfer
27	Sam Okafor	MF	(Nigeria)	Xtiam	17 March 1982 (aged 17)	1	0	Youth team	1 August 1998	Free transfer
29	Andy Arnott	MF	(England)	Chatham	18 October 1973 (aged 25)	4	0	(England) Brighton & Hove Albion	1 November 1999	Part exchange
	Adrian Webster	MF	(New Zealand)	Hastings	10 October 1980 (aged 18)	0	0	(England) Charlton Athletic	24 May 1999	Free transfer
Forwards
9	Jamie Moralee	FW	(England)	Wandsworth	2 December 1971 (aged 27)	0	0	(England) Brighton & Hove Albion	11 May 1999	Free transfer
15	Lomana LuaLua	FW	(Democratic Republic of the Congo)	(Zaire) Kinshasa	28 December 1980 (aged 18)	13	1	Leyton Sixth Form College	1 September 1998	Non-contract
19	Tony Lock	FW	(England)	Harlow	3 September 1976 (aged 22)	76	9	Apprentice	28 January 1995	Free transfer
25	KK Opara	FW	(Nigeria)	Owerri	21 December 1981 (aged 17)	1	0	Youth team	1 September 1998	Free transfer
30	Steve McGavin	FW	(England)	North Walsham	24 January 1969 (aged 30)	131	47	(England) Northampton Town	1 October 1999	Free transfer

== Transfers ==
=== In ===
Date	Position	Nationality	Name	From	Fee	Ref.
Summer 1999	FB	(England)	Andy Taylor	Youth team	Free transfer	
6 May 1999	CB	(England)	Craig Farley	(England) Watford	Free transfer	
11 May 1999	FW	(England)	Jamie Moralee	(England) Brighton & Hove Albion	Free transfer	
24 May 1999	FB	(England)	Joe Keith	(England) West Ham United	Free transfer	
24 May 1999	MF	(New Zealand)	Adrian Webster	(England) Charlton Athletic	Free transfer	
25 May 1999	MF	(Republic of Ireland)	Brian Launders	(England) Derby County	Undisclosed	
28 May 1999	CB	(Saint Kitts and Nevis)	Sagi Burton	(England) Crystal Palace	Nominal	
1 July 1999	FW	(France)	Steve Germain	(France) AS Cannes	Undisclosed	
1 July 1999	MF	(France)	Thomas Pinault	(France) AS Cannes	Free transfer	
20 July 1999	GK	(England)	Simon Brown	(England) Tottenham Hotspur	Free transfer	
1 August 1999	CB	(England)	Jack Wignall	Youth team	Free transfer	
1 August 1999	GK	(England)	Glenn Williamson	Youth team	Free transfer	
1 October 1999	FW	(England)	Steve McGavin	(England) Northampton Town	Free transfer	
1 November 1999	MF	(England)	Andy Arnott	(England) Brighton & Hove Albion	Part exchange with Warren Aspinall	
14 November 1999	MF	(England)	Gavin Johnson	(Scotland) Dunfermline Athletic	Free transfer	
7 December 1999	FB	(Republic of Ireland)	Joe Dunne	(England) Dover Athletic	Nominal	(Note: Date of signing refers to the date of the player's first game in his second spell for the club)
January 2000	CB	(England)	David Lee	(England) Crystal Palace	Non-contract	
14 February 2000	CB	(England)	Ross Johnson	(England) Brighton & Hove Albion	Free transfer	
23 March 2000	MF	(England)	Chris Keeble	(England) Ipswich Town	Free transfer	

- Total spending: ▼ ~ £0

=== Out ===
Date	Position	Nationality	Name	To	Fee	Ref.
End of season	MF	(Wales)	Geraint Williams	Free agent (Note: Remained with the club as assistant manager)	Retired	
4 May 1999	FW	(England)	Tony Adcock	(England) Heybridge Swifts	Free transfer	
4 May 1999	FB	(England)	Simon Betts	(England) Scarborough	Released	
4 May 1999	GK	(England)	Tamer Fernandes	(England) Hemel Hempstead Town	Released	
4 May 1999	DF/MF	(England)	Nicky Haydon	(England) Kettering Town	Released	
4 May 1999	MF	(England)	Dave Rainford	(England) Slough Town	Released	
4 May 1999	FB	(England)	Scott Stamps	(England) Kidderminster Harriers	Released	
31 May 1999	CB	(France)	Stéphane Pounewatchy	Free agent (Note: Following Stéphane Pounewatchy's release by Colchester United, he later joined Scunthorpe United)	Free transfer	
22 June 1999	GK	(England)	Carl Emberson	(England) Walsall	Free transfer	
14 July 1999	FW	(England)	Mark Sale	(England) Rushden & Diamonds	£30,000	
28 July 1999	MF	(England)	Paul Buckle	(England) Exeter City	Released	
1 August 1999	FW/WG	(England)	Paul Abrahams	(England) Kettering Town	Free transfer	
4 August 1999	FB	(Republic of Ireland)	Joe Dunne	(England) Dover Athletic	Released	
15 October 1999	MF	(Republic of Ireland)	Brian Launders	(England) Crystal Palace	Sacked (Note: Sacked by the club for gross misconduct)	
6 November 1999	MF	(England)	Warren Aspinall	(England) Brighton & Hove Albion	Part exchange with Andy Arnott	
19 November 1999	CB	(Saint Kitts and Nevis)	Sagi Burton	(England) Sheffield United	Free transfer	
15 December 1999	FW	(France)	Steve Germain	(France) AS Auch Gascogne	Released	
February 2000	CB	(England)	David Lee	(England) Exeter City	Free transfer	
5 February 2000	FW	(England)	Neil Gregory	(England) Canvey Island	Free transfer	
5 February 2000	GK	(England)	Andy Walker	(England) St Albans City	Undisclosed	(Note: Date of departure refers to the date of the player's final game for the club)
14 March 2000	MF	(England)	Steve Forbes	(England) Stevenage Borough	Released	
20 March 2000	FB	(France)	Fabrice Richard	(France) Red Star 93	Released	
31 March 2000	MF/DF	(England)	Richard Wilkins	Free agent	Retired	

- Total incoming: ▲ ~ £30,000

=== Loans in ===
Date	Position	Nationality	Name	From	End date	Ref.
23 September 1999	MF	(England)	Andy Arnott	(England) Brighton & Hove Albion	20 October 1999	
11 November 1999	CB	(England)	Alan White	(England) Luton Town	26 November 1999	
14 November 1999	GK	(England)	John Vaughan	(England) Lincoln City	31 December 1999	
30 December 1999	CB	(England)	Titus Bramble	(England) Ipswich Town	30 January 2000	
12 January 2000	CB	(England)	Ross Johnson	(England) Brighton & Hove Albion	12 February 2000	
23 March 2000	CB	(Republic of Ireland)	Barry Ferguson	(England) Coventry City	8 May 2000	
23 March 2000	CB	(Nigeria)	Efe Sodje	(England) Luton Town	8 May 2000	

=== Loans out ===
Date	Position	Nationality	Name	To	End date	Ref.
23 June 1999	FW	(England)	Neil Gregory	(United States) Boston Bulldogs	1 October 1999	
1 September 1999	FW	(England)	Tony Lock	(England) Kettering Town	24 September 1999	
23 September 1999	MF	(England)	Warren Aspinall	(England) Brighton & Hove Albion	5 November 1999	
1 December 1999	FW	(England)	Neil Gregory	(England) Canvey Island	1 February 2000	

== Match details ==
=== Second Division ===
==== Results round by round ====
Round	1	2	3	4	5	6	7	8	9	10	11	12	13	14	15	16	17	18	19	20	21	22	23	24	25	26	27	28	29	30	31	32	33	34	35	36	37	38	39	40	41	42	43	44	45	46
Ground	A	H	A	H	A	H	A	A	H	A	A	H	H	A	H	A	H	H	A	H	A	H	A	A	H	A	H	H	A	H	A	H	H	A	A	H	A	H	H	A	H	A	H	A	H	A
Result	W	L	L	W	L	L	L	L	D	L	D	L	D	D	D	W	L	L	D	W	L	W	L	D	W	W	W	W	L	L	W	W	L	D	W	L	L	L	W	L	D	L	W	L	L	D
Position	7	18	19	12	14	20	23	23	22	24	23	24	24	24	24	22	22	22	23	20	20	16	20	20	16	16	16	15	15	16	16	14	15	15	14	14	14	16	14	18	17	18	18	18	18	18

Source: 11v11.com
A = Away; H = Home; W = Win; D = Draw; L = Loss

==== League table ====
Pos	Team	Pld	W	D	L	GF	GA	GD	Pts
16	Bournemouth	46	16	9	21	59	62	−3	57
17	Brentford	46	13	13	20	47	61	−14	52
18	Colchester United	46	14	10	22	59	82	−23	52
19	Cambridge United	46	12	12	22	64	65	−1	48
20	Oxford United	46	12	9	25	43	73	−30	45

Rules for classification: 1) Points; 2) Goal difference; 3) Goals scored

==== Matches ====
7 August 1999 1	Chesterfield	0–1	Colchester United	Chesterfield
		Report	Dozzell 74'	Stadium: Saltergate; Attendance: 2,930; Referee: Graham Laws

14 August 1999 2	Colchester United	0–3	Notts County	Colchester
15:00 BST		Report	Hughes 5'; Stallard 35'; Blackmore 79'	Stadium: Layer Road; Attendance: 3,986; Referee: Barry Knight

21 August 1999 3	AFC Bournemouth	4–0	Colchester United	Bournemouth
	Stein 15'; Jørgensen 58'; Fletcher 80', 89'	Report	Burton (yellow card) 57' (red card)	Stadium: Dean Court; Attendance: 4,508; Referee: M Fletcher

28 August 1999 4	Colchester United	3–2	Reading	Colchester
15:00 BST	Aspinall 45', 88' (pen.); Duguid 78'	Report	Forster 22'; Williams 64'	Stadium: Layer Road; Attendance: 3,443; Referee: Paul Rejer

30 August 1999 5	Bury	5–2	Colchester United	Bury
	Lawson 12', 57', 68'; Littlejohn 15'; Preece 74'	Report	Wilkins 40'; LuaLua 82'	Stadium: Gigg Lane; Attendance: 3,360; Referee: Mike Pike

11 September 1999 6	Colchester United	0–1	Scunthorpe United	Colchester
15:00 BST		Report	Hodges 49'	Stadium: Layer Road; Attendance: 3,280; Referee: K Leach

18 September 1999 7	Burnley	3–0	Colchester United	Burnley
	Payton 9', 38' (pen.), 51'	Report		Stadium: Turf Moor; Attendance: 10,090; Referee: P Robinson

25 September 1999 8	Millwall	1–0	Colchester United	Bermondsey
	Ifill 83'	Report		Stadium: The Den; Attendance: 7,161; Referee: Anthony Leake

1 October 1999 9	Colchester United	2–2	Wrexham	Colchester
19:45 BST	Duguid 79'; Wilkins 90'	Report	Owen 56'; Morrell 85'	Stadium: Layer Road; Attendance: 3,315; Referee: Paul Danson

15 October 1999 10	Cambridge United	5–2	Colchester United	Cambridge
19:45 BST	Butler 29', 85', 88'; Greene 37' (o.g.); Benjamin 74'	Report	Dozzell 17', 54'	Stadium: Abbey Stadium; Attendance: 5,039; Referee: Graham Poll

19 October 1999 11	Bristol City	1–1	Colchester United	Bristol
	Tinnion 34'	Report	Duguid 58'	Stadium: Ashton Gate Stadium; Attendance: 7,777; Referee: Mark Warren

23 October 1999 12	Colchester United	1–2	Millwall	Colchester
15:00 BST	McGavin 17'	Report	Moody 33'; Ifill 82'	Stadium: Layer Road; Attendance: 3,392; Referee: Rob Harris

26 October 1999 13	Colchester United	2–2	Wigan Athletic	Colchester
19:45 BST	McGavin 7'; Duguid 38'	Report	Barlow 12'; Liddell 90'	Stadium: Layer Road; Attendance: 2,915; Referee: Fraser Stretton

2 November 1999 14	Oxford United	1–1	Colchester United	Oxford
	Lambert 1'	Report	McGavin 23'	Stadium: Manor Ground; Attendance: 4,444; Referee: Paul Rejer

6 November 1999 15	Colchester United	2–2	Preston North End	Colchester
15:00 GMT	Skelton 16'; LuaLua 68'	Report	Mathie 61'; Nogan 85'	Stadium: Layer Road; Attendance: 3,818; Referee: Matt Messias

14 November 1999 16	Oldham Athletic	1–2	Colchester United	Oldham
	Dudley 46'	Report	LuaLua 45'; Greene 63' (pen.)	Stadium: Boundary Park; Attendance: 5,147; Referee: D Laws

19 November 1999 17	Colchester United	0–3	Brentford	Colchester
19:45 GMT		Report	Partridge 60'; Owusu 65'; Rowlands 90'	Stadium: Layer Road; Attendance: 3,464; Referee: Mike Jones

23 November 1999 18	Colchester United	0–3	Cardiff City	Colchester
19:45 GMT		Report	Humphreys 37', 75'; Brazier 51'	Stadium: Layer Road; Attendance: 2,557; Referee: Paul Alcock

27 November 1999 19	Stoke City	1–1	Colchester United	Stoke-on-Trent
	Lightbourne 82'	Report	Skelton 71'	Stadium: Britannia Stadium; Attendance: 14,183; Referee: G Frankland

3 December 1999 20	Colchester United	1–0	Chesterfield	Colchester
19:45 GMT	LuaLua 52'	Report		Stadium: Layer Road; Attendance: 3,027; Referee: Mark Halsey

11 December 1999 21	Bristol Rovers	2–1	Colchester United	Bristol
	Roberts 31', 54'	Report	LuaLua 66'	Stadium: Memorial Stadium; Attendance: 7,023; Referee: S Tomlin

17 December 1999 22	Colchester United	3–0	Luton Town	Colchester
19:45 GMT	McGavin 48', 54'; Dozzell 74'	Report	Sodje (red card) 35'	Stadium: Layer Road; Attendance: 3,049; Referee: Lee Cable

26 December 1999 23	Gillingham	2–1	Colchester United	Gillingham
	Rowe 13'; Southall 42'	Report	McGavin 89'; White (red card) 32'	Stadium: Priestfield Stadium; Attendance: 7,338

3 January 2000 24	Blackpool	1–1	Colchester United	Blackpool
	Bent 21'	Report	Duguid 52'	Stadium: Bloomfield Road; Attendance: 3,462; Referee: D Crick

8 January 2000 25	Colchester United	5–4	Bristol Rovers	Colchester
15:00 GMT	McGavin 36', 62'; Duguid 80', 82'; LuaLua 89'	Report	Roberts 12', 46'; Cureton 59' (pen.); Ellington	Stadium: Layer Road; Attendance: 4,482; Referee: A Butler

15 January 2000 26	Notts County	1–2	Colchester United	Nottingham
	Stallard 65'	Report	McGavin 30' (pen.), 45'	Stadium: Meadow Lane; Attendance: 4,931; Referee: M Ryan

18 January 2000 27	Colchester United	1–0	Wycombe Wanderers	Colchester
19:45 GMT	LuaLua 81'	Report	Simpson (yellow card) 31' (red card); Brown (red card) 58'	Stadium: Layer Road; Attendance: 4,075; Referee: Keith Hill

22 January 2000 28	Colchester United	3–1	AFC Bournemouth	Colchester
15:00 GMT	Moralee 33'; LuaLua 63', 83'	Report	Robinson 35'	Stadium: Layer Road; Attendance: 3,767; Referee: D Pugh

29 January 2000 29	Reading	2–0	Colchester United	Reading
15:00 GMT	Caskey 22', 78'	Report		Stadium: Madejski Stadium; Attendance: 7,304; Referee: Barry Knight

5 February 2000 30	Colchester United	1–3	Bury	Colchester
15:00 GMT	Duguid 16'	Report	Swailes 23'; James 53'; Barnes 58'	Stadium: Layer Road; Attendance: 3,915; Referee: Peter Walton

12 February 2000 31	Wigan Athletic	0–1	Colchester United	Wigan
		Report	McGavin 38'	Stadium: JJB Stadium; Attendance: 6,022; Referee: Paul Danson

19 February 2000 32	Colchester United	1–0	Stoke City	Colchester
15:00 GMT	McGavin 87'	Report		Stadium: Layer Road; Attendance: 4,364; Referee: Andy Hall

26 February 2000 33	Colchester United	1–2	Burnley	Colchester
15:00 GMT	McGavin 19'	Report	Davis 17', 38'	Stadium: Layer Road; Attendance: 6,194; Referee: Rob Styles

4 March 2000 34	Scunthorpe United	0–0	Colchester United	Scunthorpe
		Report		Stadium: Glanford Park; Attendance: 4,253; Referee: J Brandwood

7 March 2000 35	Preston North End	2–3	Colchester United	Preston
	Angell 71', 82'	Report	Keith 14'; LuaLua 57'; Duguid 87'	Stadium: Deepdale; Attendance: 11,323; Referee: Terry Heilbron

11 March 2000 36	Colchester United	1–2	Oxford United	Colchester
15:00 GMT	Skelton 63'	Report	Weatherstone 22'; Whelan 90'	Stadium: Layer Road; Attendance: 4,058; Referee: Anthony Leake

17 March 2000 37	Cardiff City	3–2	Colchester United	Cardiff
	Bowen 34', 70'; Nugent 83'	Report	Dozzell 43'; LuaLua 51'	Stadium: Ninian Park; Attendance: 5,174; Referee: M Fletcher

21 March 2000 38	Colchester United	0–1	Oldham Athletic	Colchester
19:45 GMT		Report	Holt 22'	Stadium: Layer Road; Attendance: 3,282; Referee: Steve Bennett

25 March 2000 39	Colchester United	2–1	Gillingham	Colchester
15:00 GMT	McGavin 60'; Lock 66'	Report	Rowe 79'	Stadium: Layer Road; Attendance: 4,337; Referee: A Kaye

1 April 2000 40	Luton Town	3–2	Colchester United	Luton
	Watts 10'; Doherty 76'; Taylor 82'	Report	McGavin 52'; Lock 59'	Stadium: Kenilworth Road; Attendance: 5,125; Referee: Graham Barber

8 April 2000 41	Colchester United	1–1	Blackpool	Colchester
15:00 BST	Duguid 1'	Report	Thomas 66'	Stadium: Layer Road; Attendance: 3,351; Referee: Matt Messias

15 April 2000 42	Wycombe Wanderers	3–0	Colchester United	High Wycombe
15:06 BST	Ryan 62', 67'; Brown 90'	Report		Stadium: Adams Park; Attendance: 4,558; Referee: Phil Joslin

22 April 2000 43	Colchester United	3–1	Cambridge United	Colchester
15:00 BST	Duguid 17'; McGavin 22'; Keeble 57'	Report	Benjamin 54'	Stadium: Layer Road; Attendance: 4,902; Referee: K Leach

24 April 2000 44	Wrexham	1–0	Colchester United	Wrexham
	Hardy 26' (pen.)	Report		Stadium: Racecourse Ground; Attendance: 2,460; Referee: Fraser Stretton

29 April 2000 45	Colchester United	3–4	Bristol City	Colchester
15:00 BST	LuaLua 12'; Skelton 29' (pen.); Duguid 46'	Report	Murray 39'; Meechan 63'; Ferguson 71' (o.g.); Bell 84'	Stadium: Layer Road; Attendance: 4,013; Referee: Chris Foy

6 May 2000 46	Brentford	0–0	Colchester United	Brentford
15:00 BST		Report		Stadium: Griffin Park; Attendance: 5,297; Referee: B Jordan

=== Football League Cup ===
10 August 1999 1st round 1st leg	Colchester United	2–2	Crystal Palace	Colchester
19:45 BST	Dozzell 36'; LuaLua 63'; Brown (red card) 3'	Report	Smith 62'; Rizzo 90'	Stadium: Layer Road; Attendance: 4,242; Referee: B Jordan

24 August 1999 1st round 2nd leg	Crystal Palace	3–1	Colchester United	Selhurst
	Smith 18'; Morrison 37'; Rizzo 87'	Report	Keith 75'	Stadium: Selhurst Park; Attendance: 5,471; Referee: Ray Olivier
Note: Crystal Palace win 5–3 on aggregate.

=== FA Cup ===
30 October 1999 1st round	Swansea City	2–1	Colchester United	Swansea
	Cusack 83'; Watkin 89'	Report	LuaLua 52'	Stadium: Vetch Field; Attendance: 3,622; Referee: Roger Furnandiz

=== Football League Trophy ===
7 December 1999 1st round (southern section)	Swansea City	3–1	Colchester United	Swansea
15:00 GMT	Mutton 16'; Thomas 19'; Watkin 75'	Report	Moralee 56'	Stadium: Vetch Field; Attendance: 1,222; Referee: Anthony Bates

== Squad statistics ==
=== Appearances and goals ===
No.	Pos	Nat	Player	Total		Second Division		FA Cup		League Cup		Football League Trophy	
No.	Pos	Nat	Player	Apps	Goals	Apps	Goals	Apps	Goals	Apps	Goals	Apps	Goals
1	GK	(England) ENG	Simon Brown	41	0	38	0	1	0	1	0	1	0
3	DF	(England) ENG	Joe Keith	49	2	45	1	1	0	2	1	1	0
4	MF	(England) ENG	Gavin Johnson	27	0	24+3	0	0	0	0	0	0	0
5	DF	(Republic of Ireland) IRL	David Greene	32	1	29	1	1	0	2	0	0	0
6	DF	(Republic of Ireland) IRL	Joe Dunne	20	0	19+1	0	0	0	0	0	0	0
7	MF	(England) ENG	Karl Duguid	44	12	40+1	12	1	0	2	0	0	0
8	MF	(England) ENG	David Gregory	49	0	45	0	1	0	2	0	1	0
9	FW	(England) ENG	Jamie Moralee	29	2	20+7	1	0	0	0+1	0	1	1
11	MF	(England) ENG	Jason Dozzell	43	6	38+1	5	1	0	2	1	1	0
15	FW	(Democratic Republic of the Congo) COD	Lomana LuaLua	45	14	24+17	12	1	1	2	1	1	0
18	MF	(England) ENG	Chris Keeble	5	1	2+3	1	0	0	0	0	0	0
19	FW	(England) ENG	Tony Lock	26	2	12+12	2	0+1	0	0	0	1	0
20	MF	(France) FRA	Thomas Pinault	5	0	1+3	0	0	0	0+1	0	0	0
21	DF	(England) ENG	Craig Farley	16	0	8+6	0	1	0	0	0	1	0
23	MF	(England) ENG	Aaron Skelton	35	4	27+6	4	1	0	0	0	1	0
24	DF	(England) ENG	Ross Johnson	18	0	17+1	0	0	0	0	0	0	0
25	FW	(Nigeria) NGA	KK Opara	17	0	2+14	0	0	0	0	0	0+1	0
29	MF	(England) ENG	Andy Arnott	12	0	4+8	0	0	0	0	0	0	0
30	FW	(England) ENG	Steve McGavin	36	16	30+4	16	1	0	0	0	1	0
31	DF	(England) ENG	Jack Wignall	2	0	0+1	0	0	0	0	0	0+1	0
Players who appeared for Colchester who left during the season
2	DF	(France) FRA	Fabrice Richard	16	0	13+1	0	1	0	0+1	0	0	0
4	DF	(Saint Kitts and Nevis) SKN	Sagi Burton	11	0	9	0	0	0	2	0	0	0
8	MF	(England) ENG	Warren Aspinall	9	2	7	2	0	0	2	0	0	0
10	DF	(England) ENG	Titus Bramble	2	0	2	0	0	0	0	0	0	0
10	MF	(Republic of Ireland) IRL	Brian Launders	8	0	6	0	0	0	2	0	0	0
10	DF	(Nigeria) NGA	Efe Sodje	3	0	3	0	0	0	0	0	0	0
12	DF	(Republic of Ireland) IRL	Barry Feguson	6	0	5+1	0	0	0	0	0	0	0
12	FW	(France) FRA	Steve Germain	3	0	1+2	0	0	0	0	0	0	0
13	GK	(England) ENG	Andy Walker	4	0	2	0	0	0	1+1	0	0	0
16	MF	(England) ENG	Steve Forbes	2	0	0+2	0	0	0	0	0	0	0
17	MF	(England) ENG	Richard Wilkins	26	2	23+1	2	0	0	2	0	0	0
33	GK	(England) ENG	John Vaughan	6	0	6	0	0	0	0	0	0	0
34	DF	(England) ENG	Alan White	5	0	4	0	0	0	0	0	1	0

=== Goalscorers ===
Place	Number	Nationality	Position	Name	Second Division	FA Cup	League Cup	Football League Trophy	Total
1	30	(England)	FW	Steve McGavin	16	0	0	0	16
2	15	(Democratic Republic of the Congo)	FW	Lomana LuaLua	12	1	1	0	14
3	7	(Democratic Republic of the Congo)	MF	Karl Duguid	12	0	0	0	12
4	11	(England)	MF	Jason Dozzell	5	0	1	0	6
5	23	(England)	MF/DF	Aaron Skelton	4	0	0	0	4
6	3	(England)	FB	Joe Keith	1	0	1	0	2
6	8	(England)	MF	Warren Aspinall	2	0	0	0	2
6	9	(England)	FW	Jamie Moralee	1	0	0	1	2
6	17	(England)	MF/DF	Richard Wilkins	2	0	0	0	2
6	19	(England)	FW	Tony Lock	2	0	0	0	2
11	5	(Republic of Ireland)	CB	David Greene	1	0	0	0	1
11	18	(England)	MF	Chris Keeble	1	0	0	0	1
				Own goals	0	0	0	0	0
				TOTALS	59	1	3	1	64

=== Disciplinary record ===
Number	Nationality	Position	Name	Second Division		FA Cup		League Cup		Football League Trophy		Total	
Number	Nationality	Position	Name	Booked	Sent off (straight red)	Booked	Sent off (straight red)	Booked	Sent off (straight red)	Booked	Sent off (straight red)	Booked	Sent off (straight red)
7	(England)	MF	Karl Duguid	7	0	1	0	1	0	0	0	9	0
4	(Saint Kitts and Nevis)	CB	Sagi Burton	4	1	0	0	1	0	0	0	5	1
5	(Republic of Ireland)	CB	David Greene	7	0	0	0	0	0	0	0	7	0
11	(England)	MF	Jason Dozzell	5	0	0	0	0	0	0	0	5	0
34	(England)	CB	Alan White	1	1	0	0	0	0	1	0	2	1
4	(England)	MF	Gavin Johnson	4	0	0	0	0	0	0	0	4	0
1	(England)	GK	Simon Brown	0	0	0	0	0	1	0	0	0	1
6	(Republic of Ireland)	FB	Joe Dunne	3	0	0	0	0	0	0	0	3	0
8	(England)	MF	Warren Aspinall	3	0	0	0	0	0	0	0	3	0
8	(England)	MF	David Gregory	3	0	0	0	0	0	0	0	3	0
3	(England)	FB	Joe Keith	2	0	0	0	0	0	0	0	2	0
10	(England)	CB	Titus Bramble	2	0	0	0	0	0	0	0	2	0
10	(Republic of Ireland)	MF	Brian Launders	1	0	0	0	1	0	0	0	2	0
15	(Democratic Republic of the Congo)	FW	Lomana LuaLua	1	0	0	0	0	0	1	0	2	0
17	(England)	MF/DF	Richard Wilkins	2	0	0	0	0	0	0	0	2	0
19	(England)	FW	Tony Lock	2	0	0	0	0	0	0	0	2	0
30	(England)	FW	Steve McGavin	2	0	0	0	0	0	0	0	2	0
2	(England)	FB	Fabrice Richard	1	0	0	0	0	0	0	0	1	0
9	(England)	FW	Jamie Moralee	1	0	0	0	0	0	0	0	1	0
12	(Republic of Ireland)	CB	Barry Ferguson	1	0	0	0	0	0	0	0	1	0
21	(England)	CB	Craig Farley	1	0	0	0	0	0	0	0	1	0
24	(England)	CB	Ross Johnson	1	0	0	0	0	0	0	0	1	0
29	(England)	MF	Andy Arnott	1	0	0	0	0	0	0	0	1	0
			TOTALS	55	2	1	0	3	1	2	0	61	3

=== Clean sheets ===
Number of games goalkeepers kept a clean sheet.

Place	Number	Nationality	Player	Second Division	FA Cup	League Cup	Football League Trophy	Total
1	1	(England)	Simon Brown	6	0	0	0	6
2	33	(England)	John Vaughan	1	0	0	0	1
			TOTALS	7	0	0	0	7

=== Player debuts ===
Players making their first-team Colchester United debut in a fully competitive match.

Number	Position	Nationality	Player	Date	Opponent	Ground	Notes
1	GK	(England)	Simon Brown	7 August 1999	Chesterfield	Saltergate	
3	FB	(England)	Joe Keith	7 August 1999	Chesterfield	Saltergate	
4	CB	(Saint Kitts and Nevis)	Sagi Burton	7 August 1999	Chesterfield	Saltergate	
10	MF	(Republic of Ireland)	Brian Launders	7 August 1999	Chesterfield	Saltergate	(Note: Second debut for the club)
12	FW	(France)	Steve Germain	7 August 1999	Chesterfield	Saltergate	
20	MF	(France)	Thomas Pinault	14 August 1999	Notts County	Layer Road	
9	FW	(England)	Jamie Moralee	24 August 1999	Crystal Palace	Selhurst Park	
21	CB	(England)	Craig Farley	11 September 1999	Scunthorpe United	Layer Road	
29	MF	(England)	Andy Arnott	25 September 1999	Millwall	The Den	
30	FW	(England)	Steve McGavin	15 October 1999	Cambridge United	Abbey Stadium	
4	MF	(England)	Gavin Johnson	14 November 1999	Oldham Athletic	Boundary Park	
33	GK	(England)	John Vaughan	14 November 1999	Oldham Athletic	Boundary Park	
34	CB	(England)	Alan White	27 November 1999	Stoke City	Britannia Stadium	
31	CB	(England)	Jack Wignall	7 December 1999	Swansea City	Vetch Field	
6	FB	(Republic of Ireland)	Joe Dunne	17 December 1999	Luton Town	Layer Road	
29	MF	(England)	Andy Arnott	26 December 1999	Gillingham	Priestfield Stadium	
10	CB	(England)	Titus Bramble	3 January 2000	Blackpool	Bloomfield Road	
24	CB	(England)	Ross Johnson	15 January 2000	Notts County	Meadow Lane	
24	CB	(England)	Ross Johnson	19 February 2000	Stoke City	Layer Road	
10	CB	(Nigeria)	Efe Sodje	25 March 2000	Gillingham	Layer Road	
12	CB	(Republic of Ireland)	Barry Ferguson	8 April 2000	Blackpool	Layer Road	
18	MF	(England)	Chris Keeble	15 April 2000	Wycombe Wanderers	Adams Park	

== See also ==
- List of Colchester United F.C. seasons
