= 2000–01 Colchester United F.C. season =

Colchester United
2000–01 season
- Chairman: Peter Heard
- Manager: Steve Whitton
- Stadium: Layer Road
- Second Division: 17th
- FA Cup: 1st round (eliminated by Yeovil Town)
- League Cup: 2nd round (eliminated by Sheffield United)
- Football League Trophy: 1st round (southern section) (eliminated by Cambridge United)
- Top goalscorer: League: Mick Stockwell (11); All: Mick Stockwell (11)
- Highest home attendance: 5,010 v Reading, 28 April 2001
- Lowest home attendance: 1,981 v Sheffield United, 27 September 2000
- Average home league attendance: 3,466
- Biggest win: 4–0 v Bristol City, 24 February 2001
- Biggest defeat: 1–6 v Millwall, 26 December 2000
Home colours

The 2000–01 season was Colchester United's 59th season in their history and their third successive season in the third tier of English football, the Second Division. Alongside competing in the Second Division, the club also participated in the FA Cup, the League Cup and the Football League Trophy.

The main story of the season was the sale of star striker Lomana LuaLua to Premier League side Newcastle United for £2.25m. The proceeds from the sale helped to secure the medium-term future of the club.

Steve Whitton's first full season in charge of the U's ended with a minor improvement on last season with a 17th position finish. In the cups, it was a familiar story to the preceding seasons, with a first round exit in the Football League Trophy and a second round defeat to Sheffield United in the League Cup. Colchester were again dumped out of the FA Cup by non-League opposition when Yeovil Town thrashed them 5–1 in the first round.

== Season overview ==
After scoring 14 goals for Colchester in the previous season, the U's began to receive interest in Lomana LuaLua. After scoring a hat-trick against Queens Park Rangers in the League Cup, LuaLua made his transfer to Bobby Robson's Newcastle United for a fee of £2.25m in September. The deal proved to be a huge financial boost to the club that helped secure the medium-term future of Colchester United.

In the FA Cup, Colchester suffered another first round exit to non-League opposition when Yeovil Town comprehensively won 5–1 at Huish Park. In the Football League Trophy, Colchester lost in the first round to Cambridge United while Sheffield United beat the U's in the second round of the League Cup after the U's had overcome QPR in the first round.

In the league, Steve Whitton guided his side to 17th position, six points clear of the relegation places.

== Players ==
As of match played 5 May 2001.

No.	Name	Position	Nationality	Place of birth	Date of birth	Apps	Goals	Signed from	Date signed	Fee
Goalkeepers
1	Simon Brown	GK	(England)	Chelmsford	3 December 1976 (aged 23)	41	0	(England) Tottenham Hotspur	20 July 1999	Free transfer
29	Andy Woodman	GK	(England)	Camberwell	11 August 1971 (aged 28)	7	0	(England) Brentford	1 January 2001	Free transfer
30	Glenn Williamson	GK	(England)	Enfield Town	22 December 1982 (aged 17)	0	0	Youth team	1 August 1999	Free transfer
Defenders
2	Joe Dunne	FB	(Republic of Ireland)	Dublin	25 May 1973 (aged 27)	139	4	(England) Dover Athletic	7 December 1999 (Note: Date of signing refers to the date of the player's first game in his second spell for the club)	Nominal
3	Joe Keith	FB	(England)	Plaistow	1 October 1978 (aged 21)	49	2	(England) West Ham United	24 May 1999	Free transfer
5	Ross Johnson	CB	(England)	Brighton	2 January 1976 (aged 24)	18	0	(England) Brighton & Hove Albion	14 February 2000	Free transfer
6	Simon Clark	CB	(England)	Boston	12 March 1967 (aged 33)	0	0	(England) Leyton Orient	8 June 2000	Free transfer
19	Alan White	CB	(England)	Darlington	22 March 1975 (aged 25)	5	0	(England) Luton Town	16 July 2000	Free transfer
26	Scott Fitzgerald	CB	(Republic of Ireland)	(England) Westminster	13 August 1969 (aged 30)	0	0	(England) Millwall	19 October 2000	Free transfer
Midfielders
4	Gavin Johnson	MF	(England)	Eye	10 October 1970 (aged 29)	27	0	(Scotland) Dunfermline Athletic	14 November 1999	Free transfer
7	Karl Duguid	MF	(England)	Letchworth	21 March 1978 (aged 22)	149	23	Youth team	9 December 1995 (Note: Date of signing refers to the date of the player's first game for the club)	Free transfer
8	David Gregory	MF	(England)	Sudbury	23 January 1970 (aged 30)	209	25	(England) Peterborough United	8 December 1995	Free transfer
14	Chris Keeble	MF	(England)	Colchester	17 September 1978 (aged 21)	5	1	(England) Ipswich Town	23 March 2000	Free transfer
15	Thomas Pinault	MF	(France)	Grasse	4 December 1981 (aged 18)	5	0	(France) AS Cannes	1 July 1999	Free transfer
17	Andy Arnott	MF	(England)	Chatham	18 October 1973 (aged 26)	12	0	(England) Brighton & Hove Albion	1 November 1999	Part exchange
18	Aaron Skelton	MF/DF	(England)	Welwyn Garden City	22 November 1974 (aged 25)	92	11	(England) Luton Town	3 July 1997	Free transfer
20	Mick Stockwell	MF	(England)	Chelmsford	14 February 1965 (aged 35)	0	0	(England) Ipswich Town	23 July 2000	Free transfer
22	Sam Okafor	MF	(Nigeria)	Xtiam	17 March 1982 (aged 18)	1	0	Youth team	1 August 1998	Free transfer
23	Matt Hearn	MF	(England)	Barking	17 January 1984 (aged 16)	0	0	Youth team	1 July 2000	Free transfer
24	Kemal Izzet	MF	(England)	Whitechapel	29 September 1980 (aged 19)	2	0	(England) Charlton Athletic	13 April 2001	Free transfer
Forwards
9	Scott McGleish	FW	(England)	Chipping Barnet	10 February 1974 (aged 26)	17	6	(England) Barnet	12 January 2001	£15,000
10	Steve McGavin	FW	(England)	North Walsham	24 January 1969 (aged 31)	167	63	(England) Northampton Town	1 October 1999	Free transfer
21	Keith Scott	FW	(England)	Westminster	9 June 1967 (aged 32)	5	1	(England) Reading	19 March 2001	Free transfer
27	Dean Morgan	FW	(Montserrat)	(England) Edmonton	3 October 1983 (aged 16)	0	0	Youth team	1 August 2000	Free transfer

== Transfers ==
=== In ===
Date	Position	Nationality	Name	From	Fee	Ref.
8 June 2000	CB	(England)	Simon Clark	(England) Leyton Orient	Free transfer	
1 July 2000	MF	(England)	Matt Hearn	Youth team	Free transfer	
16 July 2000	CB	(England)	Alan White	(England) Luton Town	Free transfer	
23 July 2000	MF	(England)	Mick Stockwell	(England) Ipswich Town	Free transfer	
1 August 2000	FW	(Montserrat)	Dean Morgan	Youth team	Free transfer	
18 August 2000	MF	(England)	Adam Tanner	(England) Peterborough United	Free transfer	
19 October 2000	CB	(Republic of Ireland)	Scott Fitzgerald	(England) Millwall	Free transfer	
1 January 2001	GK	(England)	Andy Woodman	(England) Brentford	Free transfer	
12 January 2001	FW	(England)	Scott McGleish	(England) Barnet	£15,000	
19 March 2001	FW	(England)	Keith Scott	(England) Reading	Free transfer	
13 April 2001	MF	(England)	Kemal Izzet	(England) Charlton Athletic	Free transfer	

- Total spending: ▼ ~ £15,000

=== Out ===
Date	Position	Nationality	Name	To	Fee	Ref.
End of season	FB	(England)	Andy Taylor	Free agent	Released	
31 May 2000	CB	(England)	Craig Farley	(England) Chesham United	Released	
31 May 2000	FW	(England)	Jamie Moralee	(Wales) Barry Town	Released	
31 May 2000	MF	(New Zealand)	Adrian Webster	(England) Faversham Town	Released	
7 July 2000	CB	(Republic of Ireland)	David Greene	(Wales) Cardiff City	Free transfer	
19 September 2000	FW	(Democratic Republic of the Congo)	Lomana LuaLua	(England) Newcastle United	£2,250,000	
7 December 2000	FW	(Nigeria)	KK Opara	(England) Leyton Orient	Nominal	
26 December 2000	MF	(England)	Jason Dozzell	(England) Canvey Island	Released	(Note: Date of departure refers to the date of the player's final game for the club)
21 January 2001	MF	(England)	Adam Tanner	(England) Canvey Island	Released	
1 February 2001	DF	(England)	Sean Hillier	Free agent	Released	
16 February 2001	CB	(England)	Jack Wignall	(England) Dagenham & Redbridge	Released	
22 March 2001	FW	(England)	Tony Lock	(England) Dagenham & Redbridge	Released	

- Total incoming: ▲ ~ £2,250,000

=== Loans in ===
Date	Position	Nationality	Name	From	End date	Ref.
6 October 2000	FW	(England)	Mark Nicholls	(England) Chelsea	6 November 2000	
12 October 2000	FW	(England)	Keith Scott	(England) Reading	12 November 2000	
8 November 2000	FW	(Republic of Ireland)	Barry Conlon	(England) York City	8 May 2001	
10 November 2000	GK	(England)	Andy Woodman	(England) Brentford	31 December 2000	
22 March 2001	DF/MF	(Republic of Ireland)	Shaun Byrne	(England) West Ham United	22 April 2001	
22 March 2001	MF	(England)	Kemal Izzet	(England) Charlton Athletic	12 April 2001	

=== Loans out ===
Date	Position	Nationality	Name	To	End date	Ref.
22 March 2001	MF	(Nigeria)	Sam Okafor	(England) Dartford	8 May 2001	

== Match details ==
=== Second Division ===
==== League table ====
Pos	Team	Pld	W	D	L	GF	GA	GD	Pts
15	Oldham Athletic	46	15	13	18	53	65	−12	58
16	Bury	46	16	10	20	45	59	−14	58
17	Colchester United	46	15	12	19	55	59	−4	57
18	Northampton Town	46	15	12	19	46	59	−13	57
19	Cambridge United	46	14	11	21	61	77	−16	53

Rules for classification: 1) Points; 2) Goal difference; 3) Goals scored

==== Results round by round ====
Round	1	2	3	4	5	6	7	8	9	10	11	12	13	14	15	16	17	18	19	20	21	22	23	24	25	26	27	28	29	30	31	32	33	34	35	36	37	38	39	40	41	42	43	44	45	46
Ground	A	H	A	H	H	A	A	H	A	H	H	A	A	H	H	A	H	A	H	H	A	H	A	A	A	A	H	H	A	H	H	A	A	H	A	H	H	H	H	A	H	A	H	A	A	A
Result	D	L	W	D	W	L	D	D	D	L	L	L	L	W	W	L	L	W	D	W	W	W	L	D	W	D	L	L	L	D	W	L	L	L	W	W	L	W	W	L	D	L	W	L	D	D
Position	12	18	10	12	5	10	12	14	12	12	13	17	21	18	17	17	19	17	17	13	12	8	12	15	15	14	15	15	17	17	17	17	17	17	17	14	15	14	12	17	17	17	16	16	17	17

Source: 11v11.com
A = Away; H = Home; W = Win; D = Draw; L = Loss

==== Matches ====
12 August 2000 1	Swindon Town	0–0	Colchester United	Swindon
15:00 BST		Report		Stadium: County Ground; Attendance: 7,296; Referee: Steve Dunn

18 August 2000 2	Colchester United	0–1	Rotherham United	Colchester
19:45 BST		Report	Robins 34'	Stadium: Layer Road; Attendance: 3,807; Referee: Peter Walton

26 August 2000 3	Swansea City	0–2	Colchester United	Swansea
		Report	LuaLua 15', 83'	Stadium: Vetch Field; Attendance: 6,247; Referee: Paul Rejer

29 August 2000 4	Colchester United	1–1	Oldham Athletic	Colchester
19:45 BST	Duguid 37'	Report	Holt 52'	Stadium: Layer Road; Attendance: 3,675; Referee: Keith Hill

2 September 2000 5	Colchester United	3–1	AFC Bournemouth	Colchester
	Skelton 4', 40'; Stockwell 62'	Report	Jørgensen 44' (red card) 69'; Smith (red card) 37'	Stadium: Layer Road; Attendance: 3,459; Referee: Richard Beeby

9 September 2000 6	Wigan Athletic	3–1	Colchester United	Wigan
	Haworth 11', 42', 50'	Report	Duguid 30'	Stadium: JJB Stadium; Attendance: 5,782; Referee: Mike Pike

12 September 2000 7	Bury	0–0	Colchester United	Bury
		Report		Stadium: Gigg Lane; Attendance: 2,557; Referee: A Kaye

16 September 2000 8	Colchester United	1–1	Wrexham	Colchester
15:00 BST	Lock 63'	Report	Sam 12'	Stadium: Layer Road; Attendance: 3,724; Referee: Phil Joslin

23 September 2000 9	Bristol City	1–1	Colchester United	Bristol
	Thorpe 14'	Report	Lock 2'	Stadium: Ashton Gate Stadium; Attendance: 7,411; Referee: Mark Warren

30 September 2000 10	Colchester United	0–1	Stoke City	Colchester
15:00 BST		Report	Thorne 14'	Stadium: Layer Road; Attendance: 3,758; Referee: Lee Cable

6 October 2000 11	Colchester United	0–2	Walsall	Colchester
19:45 BST		Report	Angell 20'; Leitão 43'; Barras (red card) 16'	Stadium: Layer Road; Attendance: 3,428; Referee: Mark Halsey

14 October 2000 12	Port Vale	3–1	Colchester United	Burslem
	Tankard 4'; Naylor 68', 76'	Report	Scott 63'; White (yellow card) 90' (red card)	Stadium: Vale Park; Attendance: 3,192; Referee: D Pugh

17 October 2000 13	Brentford	1–0	Colchester United	Brentford
	Scott 89'	Report		Stadium: Griffin Park; Attendance: 3,595; Referee: Scott Mathieson

21 October 2000 14	Colchester United	2–0	Cambridge United	Colchester
15:00 BST	McGavin 39', 63' (pen.)	Report	Cowan (red card) 19'	Stadium: Layer Road; Attendance: 3,761; Referee: Paul Danson

24 October 2000 15	Colchester United	2–1	Bristol Rovers	Colchester
	Gregory 36'; Duguid 62'	Report	Ellis 87'	Stadium: Layer Road; Attendance: 2,951; Referee: S Tomlin

28 October 2000 16	Peterborough United	3–1	Colchester United	Peterborough
15:00 BST	McKenzie 56'; Lee 87'; Clarke 89'	Report	Duguid 48'; Clark (yellow card) 66' (red card)	Stadium: London Road Stadium; Attendance: 5,469; Referee: R Pearson

4 November 2000 17	Colchester United	0–2	Northampton Town	Colchester
15:00 GMT		Report	Forrester 39'; Howard 60'	Stadium: Layer Road; Attendance: 3,352; Referee: M North

11 November 2000 18	Reading	0–1	Colchester United	Reading
		Report	G. Johnson 38'	Stadium: Madejski Stadium; Attendance: 11,549; Referee: Matt Messias

25 November 2000 19	Colchester United	0–0	Wycombe Wanderers	Colchester
15:00 GMT	Lock (red card) 79'	Report		Stadium: Layer Road; Attendance: 3,646; Referee: Roger Furnandiz

2 December 2000 20	Colchester United	2–0	Notts County	Colchester
15:00 GMT	Keeble 43'; Conlon 78'	Report		Stadium: Layer Road; Attendance: 3,280; Referee: P Armstrong

16 December 2000 21	Luton Town	0–3	Colchester United	Luton
		Report	Conlon 28'; Gregory 48'; Pinault 76'	Stadium: Kenilworth Road; Attendance: 4,791; Referee: Mike Pike

22 December 2000 22	Colchester United	3–2	Oxford United	Colchester
19:45 GMT	Conlon 27'; Stockwell 35', 69'	Report	Gray 56'; Beauchamp 57'	Stadium: Layer Road; Attendance: 3,695; Referee: Paul Alcock

26 December 2000 23	Millwall	6–1	Colchester United	Bermondsey
	Harris 18', 76', 90'; Moody 26', 62'; Ifill 88'	Report	Ryan 87' (o.g.)	Stadium: The Den; Attendance: 11,156

13 January 2001 24	Oldham Athletic	1–1	Colchester United	Oldham
	Tipton 90'	Report	Stockwell 59'	Stadium: Boundary Park; Attendance: 4,076; Referee: G Cain

27 January 2001 25	Oxford United	0–1	Colchester United	Oxford
		Report	Dunne 45'	Stadium: Manor Ground; Attendance: 5,064; Referee: Colin Webster

3 February 2001 26	AFC Bournemouth	2–2	Colchester United	Bournemouth
	Hughes 63' (pen.); C. Fletcher 86'	Report	McGleish 22'; Stockwell 28'	Stadium: Dean Court; Attendance: 4,407; Referee: S Tomlin

6 February 2001 27	Colchester United	0–1	Millwall	Colchester
		Report	Ifill 21'	Stadium: Layer Road; Attendance: 4,523; Referee: Anthony Leake

10 February 2001 28	Colchester United	0–2	Wigan Athletic	Colchester
15:00 GMT		Report	Bidstrup 3'; Liddell 77'	Stadium: Layer Road; Attendance: 3,275; Referee: B Curson

17 February 2001 29	Wrexham	1–0	Colchester United	Wrexham
	McGregor 36'	Report		Stadium: Racecourse Ground; Attendance: 2,492; Referee: Howard Webb

20 February 2001 30	Colchester United	1–1	Bury	Colchester
	Skelton 59' (pen.)	Report	Preece 82'	Stadium: Layer Road; Attendance: 2,755; Referee: Fraser Stretton

24 February 2001 31	Colchester United	4–0	Bristol City	Colchester
	Gregory 7'; Keith 42'; Stockwell 57'; Conlon 69'	Report		Stadium: Layer Road; Attendance: 3,430; Referee: Trevor Parkes

27 February 2001 32	Rotherham United	3–2	Colchester United	Rotherham
	Robins 48'; Artell 50'; Hurst 84'	Report	G. Johnson 35'; Keith 74'	Stadium: Millmoor; Attendance: 5,864; Referee: A Butler

2 March 2001 33	Stoke City	3–1	Colchester United	Stoke-on-Trent
	Thorne 9', 40'; Kavanagh 88'	Report	Skelton 4' (pen.)	Stadium: Britannia Stadium; Attendance: 11,714; Referee: M Cowburn

7 March 2001 34	Colchester United	0–1	Port Vale	Colchester
19:45 GMT		Report	Brammer 54'	Stadium: Layer Road; Attendance: 2,579; Referee: J Robinson

10 March 2001 35	Walsall	0–1	Colchester United	Walsall
		Report	Conlon 56'	Stadium: Bescot Stadium; Attendance: 4,533; Referee: Phil Dowd

16 March 2001 36	Colchester United	3–1	Brentford	Colchester
	Keith 41'; Stockwell 51'; Duguid 74'	Report	Owusu 9'	Stadium: Layer Road; Attendance: 2,423; Referee: D Laws

20 March 2001 37	Colchester United	0–1	Swindon Town	Colchester
19:45 GMT		Report	Reddy 28'	Stadium: Layer Road; Attendance: 2,736; Referee: William Burns

31 March 2001 38	Colchester United	3–1	Luton Town	Colchester
15:00 BST	Stockwell 17', 37'; Skelton 43' (pen.)	Report	Howard 83' (pen.)	Stadium: Layer Road; Attendance: 4,271; Referee: Mark Warren

3 April 2001 39	Colchester United	3–0	Swansea City	Colchester
19:45 BST	Conlon 20', 86'; McGleish 64'	Report		Stadium: Layer Road; Attendance: 2,886; Referee: S Tomlin

14 April 2001 40	Bristol Rovers	2–0	Colchester United	Bristol
	Astafjevs 85'; Ellington 90'	Report		Stadium: Memorial Stadium; Attendance: 6,551; Referee: J Brandwood

17 April 2001 41	Colchester United	2–2	Peterborough United	Colchester
19:45 BST	Stockwell 18'; Izzet 77'	Report	Lee 11'; Oldfield 53'	Stadium: Layer Road; Attendance: 4,336; Referee: Chris Foy

21 April 2001 42	Northampton Town	2–0	Colchester United	Northampton
	Savage 35' (pen.); Forrester 81'	Report		Stadium: Sixfields Stadium; Attendance: 5,012; Referee: Andy Hall

28 April 2001 43	Colchester United	2–1	Reading	Colchester
15:00 BST	Conlon 34'; Skelton 43' (pen.)	Report	Cureton 24'	Stadium: Layer Road; Attendance: 5,010; Referee: Paul Danson

1 May 2001 44	Cambridge United	2–1	Colchester United	Cambridge
20:00 BST	Richardson 48'; Cowan 56'	Report	McGleish 81'	Stadium: Abbey Stadium; Attendance: 5,317

3 May 2001 45	Notts County	2–2	Colchester United	Nottingham
	Stallard 41'; Jacobsen 60'	Report	Stockwell 9'; McGleish 89'	Stadium: Meadow Lane; Attendance: 2,860; Referee: T Jones

5 May 2001 46	Wycombe Wanderers	1–1	Colchester United	High Wycombe
15:00 BST	Ryan 70'	Report	McGleish 51'	Stadium: Adams Park; Attendance: 7,516; Referee: Barry Knight

=== Football League Cup ===
23 August 2000 1st round 1st leg	Colchester United	0–1	Queens Park Rangers	Colchester
		Report	Kiwomya 27'	Stadium: Layer Road; Attendance: 3,916; Referee: M Fletcher

6 September 2000 1st round 2nd leg	Queens Park Rangers	1–4	Colchester United	Shepherd's Bush
20:00 BST	Kiwomya 45'	Report	LuaLua 11', 18', 86'; McGavin 56'	Stadium: Loftus Road; Attendance: 4,042
Note: Colchester United win 4–2 on aggregate.

19 September 2000 2nd round 1st leg	Sheffield United	3–0	Colchester United	Sheffield
	Devlin 18'; Clark 80' (o.g.); Kelly 83'	Report		Stadium: Bramall Lane; Attendance: 3,531; Referee: Paul Danson

27 September 2000 2nd round 2nd leg	Colchester United	0–1	Sheffield United	Colchester
19:45 BST		Report	Devlin 59'	Stadium: Layer Road; Attendance: 1,981; Referee: David Elleray
Note: Sheffield United win 4–0 on aggregate.

=== FA Cup ===
18 November 2000 1st round	Yeovil Town	5–1	Colchester United	Yeovil
	Patmore 50', 85'; Belgrave 53'; Skiverton 57'; Way 80' (pen.)	Report	Duguid 69'	Stadium: Huish Park; Attendance: 4,552; Referee: William Burns

=== Football League Trophy ===
5 December 2000 1st round (southern section)	Cambridge United	2–0	Colchester United	Cambridge
	Dreyer 3'; Axeldal 18'	Report		Stadium: Abbey Stadium; Attendance: 1,555; Referee: Steve Baines

== Squad statistics ==
=== Appearances and goals ===
No.	Pos	Nat	Player	Total		Second Division		FA Cup		League Cup		Football League Trophy	
No.	Pos	Nat	Player	Apps	Goals	Apps	Goals	Apps	Goals	Apps	Goals	Apps	Goals
1	GK	(England) ENG	Simon Brown	23	0	18	0	1	0	4	0	0	0
2	DF	(Republic of Ireland) IRL	Joe Dunne	39	1	31+3	1	0+1	0	3	0	1	0
3	DF	(England) ENG	Joe Keith	30	3	21+6	3	0	0	1+2	0	0	0
4	MF	(England) ENG	Gavin Johnson	42	2	33+4	2	1	0	3+1	0	0	0
5	DF	(England) ENG	Ross Johnson	18	0	17+1	0	0	0	0	0	0	0
6	DF	(England) ENG	Simon Clark	39	0	33+1	0	0+1	0	4	0	0	0
7	MF	(England) ENG	Karl Duguid	45	6	34+6	5	1	1	3	0	1	0
8	MF	(England) ENG	David Gregory	31	3	27+1	3	1	0	1	0	1	0
9	FW	(England) ENG	Scott McGleish	21	5	11+10	5	0	0	0	0	0	0
10	FW	(England) ENG	Steve McGavin	46	3	19+22	2	1	0	3	1	0+1	0
14	MF	(England) ENG	Chris Keeble	20	1	10+7	1	0	0	1+1	0	1	0
15	MF	(France) FRA	Thomas Pinault	5	1	3+2	1	0	0	0	0	0	0
17	MF	(England) ENG	Andy Arnott	5	0	1+2	0	0	0	0+1	0	1	0
18	MF	(England) ENG	Aaron Skelton	49	6	43+1	6	1	0	3	0	1	0
19	DF	(England) ENG	Alan White	37	0	29+3	0	1	0	4	0	0	0
20	MF	(England) ENG	Mick Stockwell	52	11	46	11	1	0	4	0	1	0
21 (Note: Keith Scott's squad number was 25 during his loan spell)	FW	(England) ENG	Keith Scott	9	1	8+1	1	0	0	0	0	0	0
24	MF	(England) ENG	Kemal Izzet	6	1	5+1	1	0	0	0	0	0	0
26	DF	(Republic of Ireland) IRL	Scott Fitzgerald	32	0	30	0	1	0	0	0	1	0
27	FW	(Montserrat) MSR	Dean Morgan	4	0	0+4	0	0	0	0	0	0	0
29	GK	(England) ENG	Andy Woodman	29	0	28	0	0	0	0	0	1	0
Players who appeared for Colchester who left during the season
9	FW	(Democratic Republic of the Congo) COD	Lomana LuaLua	9	5	7	2	0	0	2	3	0	0
11	MF	(England) ENG	Jason Dozzell	28	0	22	0	1	0	4	0	1	0
12	FW	(Nigeria) NGA	KK Opara	3	0	0+2	0	0	0	1	0	0	0
17	FW	(England) ENG	Tony Lock	17	2	3+11	2	0+1	0	2	0	0	0
21	MF	(England) ENG	Adam Tanner	6	0	1+3	0	0	0	1+1	0	0	0
24	FW	(England) ENG	Mark Nicholls	4	0	3+1	0	0	0	0	0	0	0
28	FW	(Republic of Ireland) IRL	Barry Conlon	28	8	23+3	8	1	0	0	0	1	0

=== Goalscorers ===
Place	Number	Nationality	Position	Name	Second Division	FA Cup	League Cup	Football League Trophy	Total
1	20	(England)	MF	Mick Stockwell	11	0	0	0	11
2	28	(Republic of Ireland)	FW	Barry Conlon	8	0	0	0	8
3	7	(England)	MF	Karl Duguid	5	1	0	0	6
3	18	(England)	MF/DF	Aaron Skelton	6	0	0	0	6
5	9	(Democratic Republic of the Congo)	FW	Lomana LuaLua	2	0	3	0	5
5	9	(England)	FW	Scott McGleish	5	0	0	0	5
7	3	(England)	FB	Joe Keith	3	0	0	0	3
7	8	(England)	MF	David Gregory	3	0	0	0	3
7	10	(England)	FW	Steve McGavin	2	0	1	0	3
10	4	(England)	MF	Gavin Johnson	2	0	0	0	2
10	17	(England)	FW	Tony Lock	2	0	0	0	2
12	2	(Republic of Ireland)	FB	Joe Dunne	1	0	0	0	1
12	14	(England)	MF	Chris Keeble	1	0	0	0	1
12	15	(France)	MF	Thomas Pinault	1	0	0	0	1
12	24	(England)	MF	Kemal Izzet	1	0	0	0	1
12	21	(England)	FW	Keith Scott	1	0	0	0	1
				Own goals	1	0	0	0	1
				TOTALS	55	1	4	0	60

=== Disciplinary record ===
Number	Nationality	Position	Name	Second Division		FA Cup		League Cup		Football League Trophy		Total	
Number	Nationality	Position	Name	Booked	Sent off (straight red)	Booked	Sent off (straight red)	Booked	Sent off (straight red)	Booked	Sent off (straight red)	Booked	Sent off (straight red)
6	(England)	CB	Simon Clark	8	1	0	0	0	0	0	0	8	1
19	(England)	CB	Alan White	6	1	0	0	1	0	0	0	7	1
2	(Republic of Ireland)	FB	Joe Dunne	4	0	1	0	0	0	0	0	5	0
4	(England)	MF	Gavin Johnson	5	0	0	0	0	0	0	0	5	0
7	(England)	MF	Karl Duguid	5	0	0	0	0	0	0	0	5	0
9	(Democratic Republic of the Congo)	FW	Lomana LuaLua	4	0	0	0	0	0	0	0	4	0
17	(England)	FW	Tony Lock	1	1	0	0	0	0	0	0	1	1
18	(England)	MF/DF	Aaron Skelton	3	0	0	0	0	0	0	0	3	0
26	(Republic of Ireland)	CB	Scott Fitzgerald	3	0	0	0	0	0	0	0	3	0
3	(England)	FB	Joe Keith	2	0	0	0	0	0	0	0	2	0
8	(England)	MF	David Gregory	2	0	0	0	0	0	0	0	2	0
11	(England)	MF	Jason Dozzell	2	0	0	0	0	0	0	0	2	0
28	(Republic of Ireland)	FW	Barry Conlon	2	0	0	0	0	0	0	0	2	0
1	(England)	GK	Simon Brown	1	0	0	0	0	0	0	0	1	0
5	(England)	CB	Ross Johnson	1	0	0	0	0	0	0	0	1	0
9	(England)	FW	Scott McGleish	1	0	0	0	0	0	0	0	1	0
14	(England)	MF	Chris Keeble	1	0	0	0	0	0	0	0	1	0
20	(England)	MF	Mick Stockwell	1	0	0	0	0	0	0	0	1	0
21	(England)	MF	Adam Tanner	1	0	0	0	0	0	0	0	1	0
24	(England)	MF	Kemal Izzet	1	0	0	0	0	0	0	0	1	0
29	(England)	GK	Andy Woodman	1	0	0	0	0	0	0	0	1	0
			TOTALS	55	3	1	0	1	0	0	0	57	3

=== Clean sheets ===
Number of games goalkeepers kept a clean sheet.

Place	Number	Nationality	Player	Second Division	FA Cup	League Cup	Football League Trophy	Total
1	29	(England)	Andy Woodman	8	0	0	0	8
2	1	(England)	Simon Brown	4	0	0	0	4
			TOTALS	12	0	0	0	12

=== Player debuts ===
Players making their first-team Colchester United debut in a fully competitive match.

Number	Position	Nationality	Player	Date	Opponent	Ground	Notes
6	CB	(England)	Simon Clark	12 August 2000	Swindon Town	County Ground	
19	CB	(England)	Alan White	12 August 2000	Swindon Town	County Ground	(Note: Second debut for the club)
20	MF	(England)	Mick Stockwell	12 August 2000	Swindon Town	County Ground	
21	MF	(England)	Adam Tanner	12 September 2000	Bury	Gigg Lane	
24	FW	(England)	Mark Nicholls	6 October 2000	Walsall	Layer Road	
25	FW	(England)	Keith Scott	14 October 2000	Port Vale	Vale Park	
26	CB	(Republic of Ireland)	Scott Fitzgerald	21 October 2000	Cambridge United	Layer Road	
27	FW	(Montserrat)	Dean Morgan	4 November 2000	Northampton Town	Layer Road	
28	FW	(Republic of Ireland)	Barry Conlon	11 November 2000	Reading	Madejski Stadium	
29	GK	(England)	Andy Woodman	11 November 2000	Reading	Madejski Stadium	
9	FW	(England)	Scott McGleish	13 January 2001	Oldham Athletic	Boundary Park	
29	GK	(England)	Andy Woodman	13 January 2001	Oldham Athletic	Boundary Park	
21	FW	(England)	Keith Scott	20 March 2001	Swindon Town	Layer Road	
24	MF	(England)	Kemal Izzet	31 March 2001	Luton Town	Layer Road	
24	MF	(England)	Kemal Izzet	14 April 2001	Bristol Rovers	Memorial Stadium	

== See also ==
- List of Colchester United F.C. seasons
