= 1995–96 Luton Town F.C. season =

English football club season

Luton Town
1995–96 season
- Chairman: David Kohler
- Manager: Terry Westley (until 18 December); Lennie Lawrence (from 21 December)
- Stadium: Kenilworth Road
- First Division: 24th (relegated)
- FA Cup: Third round
- League Cup: First round
- Anglo-Italian Cup: Group stage
- Top goalscorer: Marshall (13)
- Average home league attendance: 7,223

During the 1995–96 English football season, Luton Town F.C. competed in the Football League First Division.

== Season summary ==
Terry Westley was promoted as Pleat's successor from youth team coach, but was sacked after just six months in charge. Lennie Lawrence was brought in as a replacement, but he was unable to stop Luton from finishing bottom of Division One.

== Final league table ==
Pos	Team	Pld	W	D	L	GF	GA	GD	Pts	Qualification or relegation
20	Wolverhampton Wanderers	46	13	16	17	56	62	−6	55	
21	Portsmouth	46	13	13	20	61	69	−8	52	
22	Millwall (R)	46	13	13	20	43	63	−20	52	Relegation to the Second Division
23	Watford (R)	46	10	18	18	62	70	−8	48	Relegation to the Second Division
24	Luton Town (R)	46	11	12	23	40	64	−24	45	Relegation to the Second Division

Rules for classification: 1) Points; 2) Goals scored; 3) Goal difference
(R) Relegated

== Squad ==
Note: Flags indicate national team as defined under FIFA eligibility rules; some limited exceptions apply. Players may hold more than one non-FIFA nationality.

No.	Pos.	Nation	Player
—	GK	ENG	Kelvin Davis
—	GK	USA	Ian Feuer
—	GK	USA	Juergen Sommer
—	DF	SCO	Graham Alexander
—	DF	ENG	Ben Chenery
—	DF	ENG	Steve Davis
—	DF	IRL	David Greene
—	DF	ENG	Richard Harvey
—	DF	ENG	Julian James
—	DF	ENG	Marvin Johnson
—	DF	ENG	Des Linton
—	DF	NIR	Darren Patterson
—	DF	ENG	Aaron Skelton
—	DF	ENG	Mitchell Thomas
—	DF	ENG	Matthew Upson
—	MF	BUL	Boncho Genchev
—	MF	WAL	Ceri Hughes
—	MF	ENG	Gavin Johnson

No.	Pos.	Nation	Player
—	MF	WAL	Nathan Jones
—	MF	ENG	Rob Matthews
—	MF	ENG	Paul McLaren
—	MF	ENG	David Oldfield
—	MF	NOR	Vidar Riseth (on loan from Kongsvinger)
—	MF	DEN	Johnny Vilstrup
—	MF	IRL	Gary Waddock
—	FW	GHA	Kim Grant
—	FW	JAM	Dwight Marshall
—	FW	ENG	Scott Oakes
—	FW	ENG	John Taylor
—	FW	ENG	Tony Thorpe
—	FW	ENG	Graeme Tomlinson (on loan from Manchester United)
—	FW	ENG	Paul Wilkinson (on loan from Middlesbrough)
—	FW	ENG	Jamie Woodsford

== Player details ==
Players arranged in alphabetical order by surname.

Pos.	Name	League		Cup		Total	
Pos.	Name	Apps	Goals	Apps	Goals	Apps	Goals
DF	(Scotland) Graham Alexander	35 (2)	1	3 (2)	0	38 (4)	1
DF	(England) Ben Chenery	2	0	0	0	2	0
GK	(England) Kelvin Davis	6	0	4	0	10	0
DF	(England) Steve Davis	36	2	6	0	42	2
FW	(England) Stuart Douglas	3 (5)	1	0 (1)	0	3 (6)	1
MF	(England) Sean Evers	1	0	1	0	2	0
GK	(United States) Ian Feuer	38	0	1	0	39	0
MF	(Bulgaria) Boncho Genchev	25 (10)	9	5 (1)	2	30 (11)	11
FW	(Ghana) Kim Grant	10	3	0	0	10	3
DF	(England) Richard Harvey	28 (8)	1	6	0	34 (8)	1
MF	(Wales) Ceri Hughes	21 (2)	1	2	0	23 (2)	1
DF	(England) Julian James	23 (4)	0	4	0	27 (4)	0
MF	(England) Gavin Johnson	5 (1)	0	0	0	5 (1)	0
DF	(England) Marvin Johnson	33 (2)	0	5	1	38 (2)	1
DF	(England) Des Linton	6 (4)	0	3	0	9 (4)	0
FW	(Jamaica) Dwight Marshall	23 (3)	9	5 (1)	4	28 (4)	13
FW	(England) Rob Matthews	0	0	0 (1)	0	0 (1)	0
FW	(England) Paul McLaren	9 (3)	1	4	0	13 (3)	1
FW	(England) Scott Oakes	26 (3)	3	4	1	30 (3)	4
MF	(England) David Oldfield	23 (11)	2	5	0	28 (11)	2
DF	(Northern Ireland) Darren Patterson	21 (2)	0	3	0	24 (2)	0
DF	(England) Trevor Peake	15 (3)	0	0	0	15 (3)	0
MF	(Norway) Vidar Riseth	6 (5)	0	1	0	7 (5)	0
DF	(England) Gary Simpson	0	0	0 (1)	0	0 (1)	0
MF	(England) Aaron Skelton	0	0	1	0	1	0
GK	(United States) Juergen Sommer	2	0	2	0	4	0
FW	(England) John Taylor	18 (10)	0	3	1	21 (10)	1
DF	(England) Mitchell Thomas	25 (2)	0	2 (2)	0	27 (4)	0
FW	(England) Tony Thorpe	23 (10)	7	2 (4)	1	25 (14)	8
FW	(England) Graeme Tomlinson	1 (6)	0	0	0	1 (6)	0
DF	(England) Matthew Upson	0	0	1	0	1	0
MF	(Denmark) Johnny Vilstrup	6 (1)	0	2	0	8 (1)	0
MF	(Republic of Ireland) Gary Waddock	32 (4)	0	3 (1)	0	35 (5)	0
FW	(England) Paul Wilkinson	3	0	0	0	3	0
FW	(England) Jamie Woodsford	1 (2)	0	0 (2)	0	1 (4)	0
