= Johnny Vilstrup =

Danish footballer (1967–2025)

Personal information
- Full name: Johnny Vilstrup Pedersen
- Date of birth: 27 February 1967
- Place of birth: Copenhagen, Denmark
- Date of death: 31 August 2025 (aged 58)
- Height: 1.83 m (6 ft 0 in)
- Position: Midfielder

Senior career*
Years	Team	Apps	(Gls)
1988–1989	Fremad Valby		
1988–1989	Fremad Amager		
1991–1995	Lyngby	112	(21)
1995–1996	Luton Town	7	(0)
1996	→ AGF (loan)	12	(0)
1996–1997	AGF	15	(3)
- * Club domestic league appearances and goals

Johnny Vilstrup Pedersen (27 February 1967 – 31 August 2025) was a Danish professional footballer, who played as a midfielder for Lyngby and AGF of the Danish Superliga. He moved abroad to play professionally for Luton Town during the 1995–96 season.

== Career ==
In September 1995 Vilstrup was signed for Luton Town by manager Terry Westley for £175,000. After just seven Football League First Division appearances Westley was sacked and his replacement Lennie Lawrence discarded Vilstrup, who returned to Denmark on loan with AGF. He helped AGF win the 1995–96 Danish Cup and his transfer was made permanent for £100,000 in June 1996. A knee injury sustained in November 1996 prematurely ended Vilstrup's football career.

== Death ==
Vilstrup died on 31 August 2025, at the age of 58.
