= 1992–93 Ipswich Town F.C. season =

Ipswich Town
1992–93 season
- Chairman: John Kerr
- Manager: John Lyall
- Stadium: Portman Road
- Premier League: 16th
- FA Cup: Sixth round
- League Cup: Quarter-finals
- Top goalscorer: League: Chris Kiwomya (10); All: Chris Kiwomya (17)
- Highest home attendance: 22,093 (vs Nottingham Forest, 8 May 1993, Premier League)
- Lowest home attendance: 7,305 (vs Wigan Athletic, 6 October 1992, League Cup)
- Average home league attendance: 18,223
Home colours

During the 1992–93 English football season, Ipswich Town competed in the inaugural season of the Premier League, following promotion from the First Division the previous season.

== Season summary ==
In the 1992–93 season, Ipswich had a great start to the campaign and by January 1993, were in fourth place in the league and fans were hoping for at least a UEFA Cup place, maybe even the Premiership title, but a dip in form during the final weeks of the season saw the club finish 16th.

== First-team squad ==
Squad at end of season

Note: Flags indicate national team as defined under FIFA eligibility rules; some limited exceptions apply. Players may hold more than one non-FIFA nationality.

Pos.	Nation	Player
GK	ENG	Clive Baker
GK	CAN	Craig Forrest
GK	AUS	Andy Petterson (on loan from Luton Town)
DF	ENG	David Linighan
DF	ENG	Steve Palmer
DF	ENG	Neil Thompson
DF	ENG	Phil Whelan
DF	CAN	Frank Yallop
DF	ENG	Eddie Youds
MF	AUS	Vlado Bozinovski
MF	ENG	Jason Dozzell

Pos.	Nation	Player
MF	BUL	Boncho Genchev
MF	ENG	David Gregory
MF	ENG	Gavin Johnson
MF	ENG	Simon Milton
MF	ENG	Mick Stockwell
MF	SCO	John Wark (captain)
MF	WAL	Geraint Williams
FW	ENG	Paul Goddard
FW	ENG	Chris Kiwomya
FW	ENG	Steve Whitton

=== Left club during season ===
Note: Flags indicate national team as defined under FIFA eligibility rules; some limited exceptions apply. Players may hold more than one non-FIFA nationality.

Pos.	Nation	Player
DF	ENG	Glenn Pennyfather (to Bristol City)

=== Reserve squad ===
Note: Flags indicate national team as defined under FIFA eligibility rules; some limited exceptions apply. Players may hold more than one non-FIFA nationality.

Pos.	Nation	Player
GK	ENG	Phil Morgan
GK	ENG	Jason Winters

Pos.	Nation	Player
MF	ENG	Matt Weston
FW	ZAM	Neil Gregory

== Competitions ==
=== FA Premier League ===
==== League table ====
Pos	Team	Pld	W	D	L	GF	GA	GD	Pts
14	Sheffield United	42	14	10	18	54	53	+1	52
15	Coventry City	42	13	13	16	52	57	−5	52
16	Ipswich Town	42	12	16	14	50	55	−5	52
17	Leeds United	42	12	15	15	57	62	−5	51
18	Southampton	42	13	11	18	54	61	−7	50

Source: Premier League
Rules for classification: 1) points; 2) goal difference; 3) number of goals scored.

==== Legend ====
Win	Draw	Loss

Ipswich Town's score comes first

==== Matches ====
Date	Opponent	Venue	Result	Attendance	Scorers
15 August 1992	Aston Villa	H	1–1	16,818	Johnson
18 August 1992	Wimbledon	A	1–0	4,954	Johnson
22 August 1992	Manchester United	A	1–1	31,764	Kiwomya
25 August 1992	Liverpool	H	2–2	20,109	Dozzell, Kiwomya
30 August 1992	Tottenham Hotspur	H	1–1	20,100	Wark
1 September 1992	Middlesbrough	A	2–2	14,255	Wark, Goddard
5 September 1992	Queens Park Rangers	A	0–0	12,806	
12 September 1992	Wimbledon	H	2–1	13,333	Stockwell (2)
19 September 1992	Oldham Athletic	A	2–4	11,150	Thompson, Wark
26 September 1992	Sheffield United	H	0–0	16,353	
3 October 1992	Leeds United	H	4–2	21,200	Wark (2), Dozzell, Kiwomya
17 October 1992	Chelsea	A	1–2	18,072	Whitton
24 October 1992	Crystal Palace	H	2–2	17,861	Dozzell (2)
31 October 1992	Nottingham Forest	A	1–0	21,411	Dozzell
7 November 1992	Southampton	H	0–0	15,722	
21 November 1992	Sheffield Wednesday	A	1–1	24,270	Kiwomya
28 November 1992	Everton	H	1–0	18,032	Johnson
5 December 1992	Coventry City	A	2–2	11,294	Whitton, Kiwomya
12 December 1992	Manchester City	H	3–1	16,833	Stockwell, Johnson, Goddard
21 December 1992	Norwich City	A	2–0	20,032	Thompson, Kiwomya
26 December 1992	Arsenal	A	0–0	26,198	
28 December 1992	Blackburn Rovers	H	2–1	21,431	Genchev, Kiwomya
9 January 1993	Oldham Athletic	H	1–2	15,025	Kiwomya
16 January 1993	Sheffield United	A	0–3	16,758	
27 January 1993	Tottenham Hotspur	A	2–0	23,738	Genchev, Yallop
30 January 1993	Manchester United	H	2–1	22,068	Yallop, Kiwomya
6 February 1993	Aston Villa	A	0–2	25,396	
9 February 1993	Queens Park Rangers	H	1–1	17,354	Thompson
20 February 1993	Liverpool	A	0–0	36,680	
27 February 1993	Leeds United	A	0–1	28,848	
2 March 1993	Middlesbrough	H	0–1	15,430	
10 March 1993	Sheffield Wednesday	H	0–1	16,538	
13 March 1993	Southampton	A	3–4	15,428	Linighan, Goddard, Kiwomya
20 March 1993	Coventry City	H	0–0	16,698	
24 March 1993	Everton	A	0–3	15,638	
3 April 1993	Manchester City	A	1–3	20,680	Johnson
6 April 1993	Chelsea	H	1–1	17,444	Genchev
10 April 1993	Arsenal	H	1–2	20,353	Wark
12 April 1993	Blackburn Rovers	A	1–2	14,071	Milton
19 April 1993	Norwich City	H	3–1	21,087	Stockwell, Dozzell (2)
1 May 1993	Crystal Palace	A	1–3	18,881	D Gregory
8 May 1993	Nottingham Forest	H	2–1	22,093	Milton, Whitton

=== FA Cup ===
Round	Date	Opponent	Venue	Result	Attendance	Goalscorers
R3	12 January 1993	Plymouth Argyle	H	3–1	12,803	Thompson, Whitton, Dozzell
R4	23 January 1993	Tranmere Rovers	A	2–1	13,683	Genchev, Dozzell
R5	13 February 1993	Grimsby Town	H	4–0	17,894	Wark, Genchev (3)
QF	6 March 1993	Arsenal	H	2–4	22,054	Genchev, Kiwomya

=== League Cup ===
Round	Date	Opponent	Venue	Result	Attendance	Goalscorers
R2 First Leg	22 September 1992	Wigan Athletic	A	2–2	2,684	Johnson, Robertson (own goal)
R2 Second Leg	6 October 1992	Wigan Athletic	H	4–0 (won 6–2 on agg)	7,305	Johnson, Kiwomya (3)
R3	27 October 1992	Portsmouth	A	1–0	10,773	Thompson
R4	2 December 1992	Aston Villa	A	2–2	21,545	Kiwomya (2)
R4R	15 December 1992	Aston Villa	H	1–0	19,196	Kiwomya
QF	19 January 1993	Sheffield Wednesday	H	1–1	19,374	Whitton (pen)
QFR	3 February 1993	Sheffield Wednesday	A	0–1	26,328	

== Transfers ==
=== Transfers in ===
Date	Pos	Name	From	Fee	Ref
1 July 1992	MF	(Wales) Geraint Williams	(England) Derby County	£650,000	
1 August 1992	GK	(England) Clive Baker	(England) Coventry City	Undisclosed	
1 August 1992	GK	(England) Jason Winters	(England) Chelsea	Free transfer	
1 December 1992	MF	(Australia) Vlado Bozinovski	(Portugal) Beira-Mar	Undisclosed	
11 December 1992	MF	(Bulgaria) Boncho Genchev	(Portugal) Sporting CP	£250,000	

=== Loans in ===
Date from	Pos	Name	From	Date until	Ref
26 March 1993	GK	(Australia) Andy Petterson	(England) Luton Town	31 May 1993	

=== Transfers out ===
Date	Pos	Name	To	Fee	Ref
1 July 1992	MF	(Netherlands) Romeo Zondervan	(Netherlands) NAC Breda	Undisclosed	
13 July 1992	MF	(England) David Lowe	(England) Leicester City	£300,000	
13 August 1992	MF	(England) Simon Betts	(Wales) Wrexham	Free transfer	
1 March 1993	DF	(England) Glenn Pennyfather	(England) Bristol City	£80,000	

=== Loans out ===
Date from	Pos	Name	From	Date until	Ref
1 February 1993	DF	(England) Glenn Pennyfather	(England) Bristol City	1 March 1993	

== Awards ==
=== Player awards ===
Award	Player
Player of the Year	(England) Mick Stockwell
