= Matthew Upson =

English footballer (born 1979)

Matt Upson
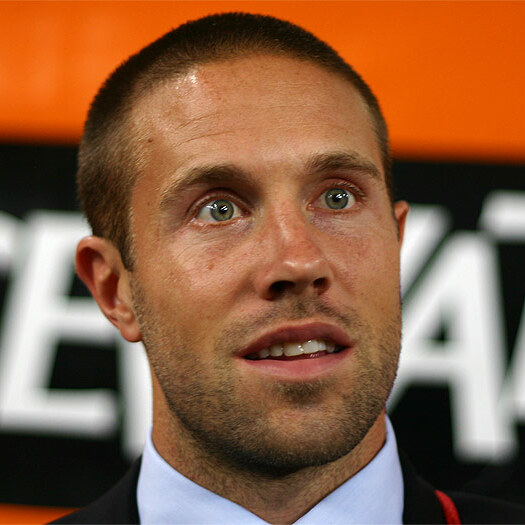
- Upson in 2009

Personal information
- Full name: Matthew James Upson
- Date of birth: 18 April 1979 (age 47)
- Place of birth: Eye, Suffolk, England
- Height: 6 ft 1 in (1.85 m)
- Position: Centre back

Youth career
- –: Ipswich Town
- 1994–1996: Luton Town

Senior career*
Years	Team	Apps	(Gls)
1996–1997	Luton Town	1	(0)
1997–2003	Arsenal	35	(0)
2000	→ Nottingham Forest (loan)	1	(0)
2001	→ Crystal Palace (loan)	7	(0)
2002	→ Reading (loan)	14	(0)
2003–2007	Birmingham City	113	(5)
2007–2011	West Ham United	131	(4)
2011–2013	Stoke City	15	(2)
2013	→ Brighton & Hove Albion (loan)	18	(1)
2013–2014	Brighton & Hove Albion	43	(2)
2014–2015	Leicester City	5	(0)
2015–2016	Milton Keynes Dons	3	(0)
Total		386	(14)

International career
1997–1998	England U18	9	(0)
1998–2000	England U21	12	(2)
2003–2010	England	21	(2)
- * Club domestic league appearances and goals

Matthew James Upson (born 18 April 1979) is an English former professional footballer who played as a centre back. Upson played for England at full international level, including at the 2010 World Cup.

Upson started his career with Bedfordshire club Luton Town before he joined Premier League club Arsenal for a fee of £2 million in May 1997. Upson struggled to force his way into the first team at Highbury making 57 appearances in 6 seasons and also spent time out on loan at Nottingham Forest, Crystal Palace and Reading.

Upson joined Birmingham City in 2003 where he enjoyed regular first team football. However following Birmingham's relegation in 2006 he went on to join West Ham United for £7.5 million in January 2007. He was made captain in 2009 following the departure of Lucas Neill. At the end of the 2010–11 season West Ham were relegated to the Championship and Upson left after his contract had expired. Upson signed a two-year contract with Stoke City in August 2011. After a loan spell with Brighton & Hove Albion in the 2012–13 season, he signed a one-year contract with the club in 2013.

== Club career ==
=== Luton Town ===
Originally at the Ipswich Town Centre of Excellence, he joined Luton Town as a trainee after Ipswich youth coach Terry Westley moved there. Upson signed professional forms in April 1996, and made his sole Football League appearance for the team as an 88th-minute substitute against Rotherham United in August 1996.

=== Arsenal ===
He joined Arsenal in May 1997 in a £2 million deal. However, faced with the longevity of Arsenal's existing centre backs, Tony Adams, Steve Bould and Martin Keown, and struck by injury problems of his own, Upson rarely had a chance to break into the first team. He played only five matches in the 1997–98 Premier League season as Arsenal won the title, so did not qualify for a winners' medal. After spending a year out of the game recovering from an anterior cruciate ligament injury sustained in 1999, Upson made a handful of first-team appearance for Arsenal, in between loan spells at Nottingham Forest in 2000 and Crystal Palace in 2001.

In 2001–02, his final full season at Arsenal, Upson made 22 appearances. These included 14 in the league, which earned him a Premier League winners' medal, but a broken leg in February 2002 ruled him out for the rest of the season and Arsenal's FA Cup-winning run as they won the Double. After recovering from the injury, Upson joined Reading in September 2002 on a three-month loan. It was for Reading that he scored his first professional career goal, in a 3–1 loss away to Cambridge United in the League Cup. With Arsenal's newly established centre-back pairing of Sol Campbell and Kolo Touré keeping him out of the team, he was bought by Birmingham City in January 2003.

=== Birmingham City ===
Birmingham City completed the signing of Upson from Arsenal in January 2003, for what BBC Sport thought to be an initial fee of £1 million, potentially rising to £3 million depending on appearances.

He suffered a leg injury whilst preparing for the local derby against Aston Villa in April 2006 and subsequently missed the rest of the season as Birmingham City were relegated to the Championship. Upson remained with the club while he worked on regaining his fitness, and returned to action in December in the 3–0 victory over Plymouth Argyle, scoring the second of the three goals.

=== West Ham United ===
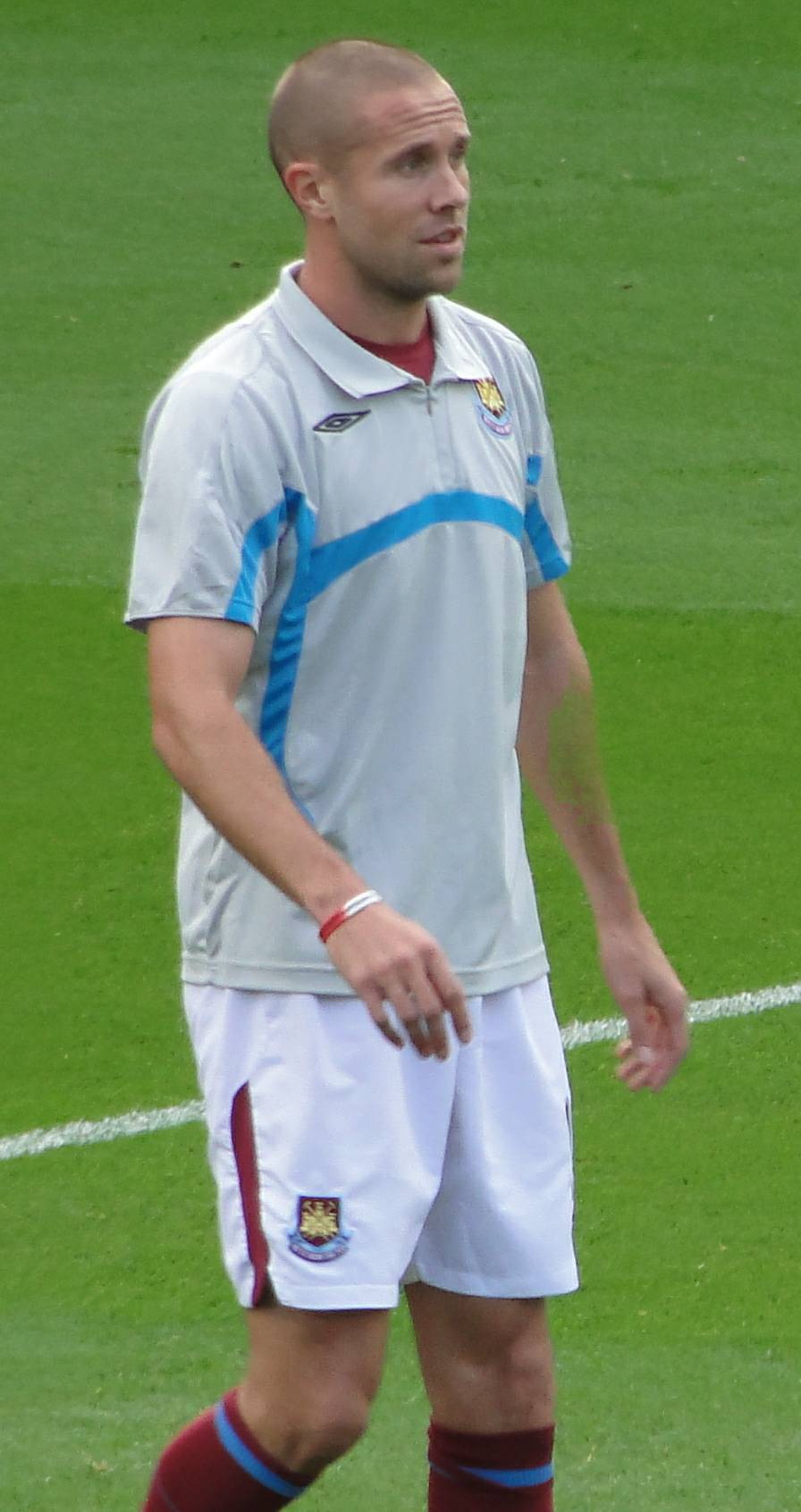
Upson warming up for West Ham United in 2009

On 18 January 2007, Birmingham rejected West Ham United's bid for Upson of £4 million, and turned down an improved bid of £6 million a few days later. An offer of £6 million, with the potential to rise to £7.5 million depending on appearances, was accepted on the last day of the transfer window, and Upson agreed a four-and-a-half-year contract with West Ham. Birmingham City's manager Steve Bruce later claimed that he did not want to sell Upson, but was forced to do so by the club's managing director Karren Brady.

Upson suffered a calf injury less than 30 minutes into his West Ham United debut, a 1–0 defeat against Aston Villa. He then lasted just 11 minutes of his comeback match before coming off injured against Tottenham Hotspur in a 4–3 loss at Upton Park in March 2007.

Upson completed his first full match for West Ham in the 2–0 home defeat to Manchester City in August 2007. One week later he made his first appearance as West Ham captain in the 1–0 away win against former club Birmingham City. On 29 December, Upson scored for the first time in West Ham colours when he headed in the winning goal against Premier League champions Manchester United.

In July 2008, Upson's squad number of 6 was retired by the club in memory of Bobby Moore, after which he took the number 15 shirt. In August 2009, following the departure of Lucas Neill, Upson was appointed captain of West Ham. He captained West Ham through a difficult 2009–10 campaign in which he scored a goal in the opening match against Wolverhampton Wanderers and two more against Stoke City and Portsmouth.

Following West Ham's relegation from the Premier League in May 2011, new manager Sam Allardyce confirmed that Upson would leave the club when his contract expired.

=== Stoke City ===
Upson joined Stoke City on a two-year contract on 9 August 2011. He said that playing in the UEFA Europa League was one of the main reasons he decided to join Stoke. Upson made his debut for Stoke in a 1–0 victory over FC Thun in the Europa League, and scored his first goal for the club in the second leg in a 4–1 victory at the Britannia Stadium. After joining Stoke, Upson and fellow summer signing Jonathan Woodgate were used as backup to first-choice centre backs Robert Huth and Ryan Shawcross. He was a regular in the Europa League, appearing in all six group matches, but was sent off in the last as Stoke qualified for the round of 32. He scored his first league goal for Stoke in a 2–0 home win against Swansea City on 26 February 2012 in a man-of-the-match performance. With Shawcross suspended, Upson made his first League appearance of the 2012–13 season on 29 December 2012 against Southampton; he scored Stoke's second goal in a 3–3 draw.

=== Brighton & Hove Albion ===
On 31 January 2013, Upson joined Championship club Brighton & Hove Albion on loan until the end of the season. He scored his first goal for the Seagulls in a 6–1 win over Blackpool on 20 April. Released by Stoke at the end of the season, Upson joined Brighton on a permanent basis on 10 July 2013, signing a one-year contract. He was voted the club's Player of the Year in 2013–14.

=== Leicester City ===
On 23 May 2014, Upson agreed a one-year contract with newly promoted Premier League club Leicester City. After spending the first half of the season on the sidelines with injury, he returned to full training in late January 2015. On 10 February, Upson made his Leicester debut, playing nearly an hour before being substituted, in a 2–1 defeat to his former club Arsenal. He was released when his contract expired at the end of the season.

=== Milton Keynes Dons ===
On 30 July 2015, Upson signed for Championship club Milton Keynes Dons on a one-year contract. He made his debut on 11 August in the 2–1 League Cup first round win against Leyton Orient, but made only six more appearances for the club and his contract was not renewed. He retired from playing in 2016.

== International career ==
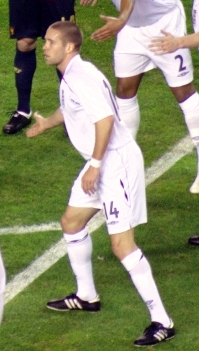
Upson playing for England in 2009

Upson played for England at youth level before being capped twelve times for the under-21 team, for whom he scored two goals. Regular Premier League football for Birmingham City in the 2002–03 season led to his selection for the senior squad, and he made his debut for England against South Africa in May 2003. He won seven full caps while a Birmingham player.

Upson was named in Fabio Capello's first provisional England squad for the February 2008 friendly against Switzerland at Wembley. He was named in the starting line-up to partner Rio Ferdinand, winning his eighth England cap more than three years after his last appearance. He also started against Kazakhstan in October after John Terry picked up an injury.

Upson scored his first goal for England on 19 November 2008 in a friendly match against Germany. The match finished 2–1 to England and Upson picked up ITV's man of the match award. He was included in England's squad for the 2010 World Cup in South Africa. On 23 June, making his World Cup debut, he played in the third match of the group stage, against Slovenia after being an unused substitute in the first two matches. He scored England's goal in the 4–1 defeat against Germany in the round of 16 – his second goal for England and his second against Germany. It made him England's joint top scorer for the 2010 World Cup, tying with Steven Gerrard and Jermain Defoe on one goal each. The match was a defensive fiasco for Upson, who, along with Terry was caught out by a goal-kick allowing Miroslav Klose to score the opener on 20 minutes. The defenders were also opened up for Lukas Podolski to score 12 minutes later. In the second half, Upson and Terry were caught on the break twice as England attempted to equalise.

== Personal life ==
Upson was born in Eye, Suffolk, and attended Diss High School in Norfolk.

Upson and British runner Ellie Darby have a son named Elijah who came through the Tottenham Hotspur's academy. In July 2026, Elijah signed for Matthew's former club Arsenal.

Upson has appeared as a football pundit for the BBC's Match of the Day and during their 2018 World Cup and 2022 World Cup coverage.

== Career statistics ==
=== Club ===
Appearances and goals by club, season and competition
Club	Season	League			FA Cup		League Cup		Europe		Other		Total	
Club	Season	Division	Apps	Goals	Apps	Goals	Apps	Goals	Apps	Goals	Apps	Goals	Apps	Goals
Luton Town	1995–96	First Division	0	0	0	0	0	0	—		1 (Note: Appearance in Anglo-Italian Cup)	0	1	0
Luton Town	1996–97	Second Division	1	0	0	0	0	0	—		0	0	1	0
Luton Town	Total		1	0	0	0	0	0	—		1	0	2	0
Arsenal	1997–98	Premier League	5	0	1	0	2	0	0	0	—		8	0
Arsenal	1998–99	Premier League	5	0	1	0	2	0	1 (Note: Appearance(s) in UEFA Champions League)	0	0	0	9	0
Arsenal	1999–2000	Premier League	9	0	0	0	2	0	2	0	0	0	13	0
Arsenal	2000–01	Premier League	2	0	0	0	1	0	1	0	—		4	0
Arsenal	2001–02	Premier League	14	0	1	0	1	0	6	0	—		22	0
Arsenal	2002–03	Premier League	0	0	1	0	—		—		0	0	1	0
Arsenal	Total		35	0	4	0	8	0	10	0	0	0	57	0
Nottingham Forest (loan)	2000–01	First Division	1	0	—		—		—		—		1	0
Crystal Palace (loan)	2000–01	First Division	7	0	—		—		—		—		7	0
Reading (loan)	2002–03	First Division	14	0	—		1	1	—		—		15	1
Birmingham City	2002–03	Premier League	14	0	—		—		—		—		14	0
Birmingham City	2003–04	Premier League	30	0	2	0	1	0	—		—		33	0
Birmingham City	2004–05	Premier League	36	2	2	0	2	0	—		—		40	2
Birmingham City	2005–06	Premier League	24	1	1	0	4	0	—		—		29	1
Birmingham City	2006–07	Championship	9	2	3	0	0	0	—		—		12	2
Birmingham City	Total		113	5	8	0	7	0	—		—		128	5
West Ham United	2006–07	Premier League	2	0	—		—		—		—		2	0
West Ham United	2007–08	Premier League	29	1	2	0	2	0	—		—		33	1
West Ham United	2008–09	Premier League	37	0	2	0	2	0	—		—		41	0
West Ham United	2009–10	Premier League	33	3	1	0	1	0	—		—		35	3
West Ham United	2010–11	Premier League	30	0	1	0	3	0	—		—		34	0
West Ham United	Total		131	4	6	0	8	0	—		—		145	4
Stoke City	2011–12	Premier League	14	1	2	0	1	0	8 (Note: Appearances in UEFA Europa League)	1	—		25	2
Stoke City	2012–13	Premier League	1	1	0	0	1	0	—		—		2	1
Stoke City	Total		15	2	2	0	2	0	8	1	—		27	3
Brighton & Hove Albion (loan)	2012–13	Championship	18	1	—		—		—		2 (Note: Appearance(s) in Championship play-offs)	0	20	1
Brighton & Hove Albion	2013–14	Championship	43	2	3	0	0	0	—		1	0	47	2
Brighton & Hove Albion	Total		61	3	3	0	0	0	—		3	0	67	3
Leicester City	2014–15	Premier League	5	0	1	0	0	0	—		—		6	0
Milton Keynes Dons	2015–16	Championship	3	0	2	0	2	0	—		—		7	0
Career total			386	14	26	0	28	1	18	1	4	0	462	16

=== International ===
Appearances and goals by national team and year
National team	Year	Apps	Goals
England	2003	6	0
England	2004	1	0
England	2005	0	0
England	2006	0	0
England	2007	0	0
England	2008	5	1
England	2009	6	0
England	2010	3	1
Total		21	2

England score listed first, score column indicates score after each Upson goal.

International goals by date, venue, cap, opponent, score, result and competition
No.	Date	Venue	Cap	Opponent	Score	Result	Competition	Ref
1	19 November 2008	Olympiastadion, Berlin, Germany	12	Germany	1–0	2–1	Friendly	
2	27 June 2010	Free State Stadium, Bloemfontein, South Africa	21	Germany	1–2	1–4	2010 FIFA World Cup	

== Honours ==
Arsenal

- Premier League: 2001–02
- FA Community Shield: 2002

Individual

- Brighton & Hove Albion Player of the Year: 2013–14
