= Andy Arnott =

English footballer

Personal information
- Full name: Andrew John Arnott
- Date of birth: 18 October 1973 (age 53)
- Place of birth: Chatham, England
- Height: 6 ft 0 in (1.83 m)
- Positions: Midfielder; forward

Youth career
- Gillingham

Senior career*
Years	Team	Apps	(Gls)
1991–1996	Gillingham	73	(12)
1992	→ Manchester United (loan)	0	(0)
1996–1997	Leyton Orient	50	(6)
1997–1998	Fulham	1	(0)
1998	→ Rushden & Diamonds (loan)		
1998–1999	Brighton & Hove Albion	28	(2)
1999	→ Colchester United (loan)	4	(0)
1999–2000	Colchester United	11	(0)
2000–2002	Stevenage Borough	7	(0)
2002–2004	Dover Athletic		
2004	Welling United		
- Ashford Town (Kent)
Total		174	(20)
- * Club domestic league appearances and goals

Andrew John Arnott (born 18 October 1973) is an English former footballer who played as a midfielder in the Football League, but also occasionally deputised as a forward. He began his career with Gillingham, later joining Manchester United on loan with a view to a permanent move, although he made no appearances. He subsequently played for Leyton Orient, Fulham, Brighton & Hove Albion and Colchester United in the Football League.

== Career ==
Born in Chatham, Arnott began his career at nearby Gillingham, where he signed his first professional contract in May 1991. At the end of the 1991–92 season, after only 32 appearances and 8 goals, Arnott went on loan to Manchester United, specifically to play in the Blue Star youth tournament in Zurich. He started all United's games as they reached the final, scoring two of their six goals, before they lost 1–0 to FC Spartak Moscow. However, he did not join the club and returned to Gillingham for the start of the next season. He concluded his time at Gillingham with a record of 12 goals in 73 league games.

Leyton Orient signed Arnott in January 1996 for a fee fixed by tribunal at £10,000, a further £5,000 after 50 first team appearances and a 25 per cent sell-on clause. He made his debut against Darlington in February 1996 and made 54 League and cup appearances, scoring six goals. He did enough to convince Fulham to pay £23,000 for his services in the summer of 1997, but under Mohamed Al-Fayed's regime at the club Arnott could only manage one substitute appearance. He was loaned out to Rushden & Diamonds in 1998, before transferring to Brighton & Hove Albion for £20,000 in October 1998. He made 28 appearances for Brighton, and was involved in a swap loan deal with Colchester United in September 1999, being exchanged for Warren Aspinall. After making four appearances, the deal was made permanent in November of the same year.

Arnott made 15 league appearances in total while with the club, but was forced to call time on his professional career after undergoing a hernia operation. After leaving Colchester, he signed for Stevenage Borough in December 2000, making his debut for Stevenage on 18 August 2001 against Stalybridge Celtic. Again, he was troubled with injuries during his time, joining Dover Athletic in 2002. He was made team captain for Dover, and moved to Welling United in 2004 before a final move to Ashford Town (Kent).

== Career statistics ==
Appearances and goals by club, season and competition
Club	Season	League			FA Cup		League Cup		Other^{[A]}		Total	
Club	Season	Division	Apps	Goals	Apps	Goals	Apps	Goals	Apps	Goals	Apps	Goals
Leyton Orient	1995–96	Third Division	19	3	0	0	0	0	0	0	19	3
Leyton Orient	1996–97	Third Division	31	3	2	0	2	0	0	0	35	3
Leyton Orient	Total		50	6	2	0	2	0	0	0	54	6
Fulham	1997–98	Second Division	1	0	0	0	0	0	2	0	3	0
Brighton & Hove Albion	1998–99	Third Division	27	2	1	0	0	0	1	0	29	2
Brighton & Hove Albion	1999–2000	Third Division	1	0	0	0	1	0	0	0	2	0
Brighton & Hove Albion	Total		28	2	1	0	1	0	1	0	31	2
Colchester United (loan)	1999–2000	Second Division	4	0	0	0	0	0	0	0	4	0
Colchester United	1999–2000	Second Division	8	0	0	0	0	0	0	0	8	0
Colchester United	2000–01	Second Division	3	0	0	0	1	0	1	0	5	0
Colchester United	Total		11	0	0	0	1	0	1	0	13	0
Stevenage Borough	2001–02	Conference	7	0	0	0	0	0	0	0	7	0
Career total			78	5	1	0	4	0	4	0	87	5

A. The "Other" column constitutes appearances and goals (including those as a substitute) in the Football League Trophy.
