= Karl Duguid =

English footballer (born 1978)

Personal information
- Full name: Karl Anthony Duguid
- Date of birth: 21 March 1978 (age 48)
- Place of birth: Letchworth, England
- Height: 1.80 m (5 ft 11 in)
- Positions: Midfielder; defender

Youth career
- 1994–1995: Colchester United

Senior career*
Years	Team	Apps	(Gls)
1995–2008	Colchester United	383	(42)
2008–2011	Plymouth Argyle	107	(2)
2011–2014	Colchester United	31	(3)
2014–2015	Stanway Rovers		
2015	Welling United	3	(0)
2015	Stanway Rovers		
2015–2016	Needham Market	11	(0)
2016	Heybridge Swifts	0	(0)
2016–2018	Stanway Rovers	5	(0)
Total		540	(47)

Managerial career
- 2016–2018: Stanway Rovers
- 2019–2020: Heybridge Swifts
- 2021–2022: Coggeshall Town
- 2022–2023: Stanway Rovers
- * Club domestic league appearances and goals

Karl Anthony Duguid (born 21 March 1978) is an English former professional footballer. He spent the majority of his playing career with Colchester United where, over two stints, he made over 400 league appearances. He also played for Plymouth Argyle before finishing his professional career at Colchester, where he became a coach following his retirement in 2014.

After leaving his coaching role at Colchester in October 2014, Duguid returned to playing with Stanway Rovers the same month, before joining Welling United in the Conference in January 2015. He returned to Stanway after two months with Welling, before making a move to Needham Market in the summer of 2015, where he became academy manager alongside former Colchester teammate Kemal Izzet. He joined Heybridge Swifts in May 2016, and was appointed manager of Stanway Rovers in December 2016. In June 2018, Duguid returned to Heybridge Swifts and was appointed as assistant manager, later serving as manager from 2019 to 2020. After a short stint as assistant manager at Stanway Rovers in 2021, he was appointed joint manager of Coggeshall Town. He returned to Stanway as manager the following year, leaving in 2023.

== Playing career ==
=== Colchester United ===
Duguid, born in Letchworth, had been at Colchester United since he was a 16-year-old, coming up through the youth team scheme at Layer Road. He was playing in the first team by the age of 17 as a second-year YTS. He missed a crucial penalty as Colchester lost the 1997 Football League Trophy Final in a shootout against Carlisle United. He helped the club win promotion to the Second Division in 1998, via the play-offs. A serious knee injury ruled him out of the whole 2004–05 season. However, he returned as captain and led Colchester to promotion to the Championship for the first time ever, followed by their highest ever league position 12 months later. After the first year in the Championship, Duguid kicked off 2007–08 campaign by making his 400th appearance at Sheffield United on the opening day. He signed a new contract in January 2007, and played in all but three of the U's league games but was unable to prevent them from suffering relegation back to League One.

Duguid's status with the Colchester fans was demonstrated when he was voted the club's best ever player in a poll to mark the centenary of the Professional Footballers' Association. He made nearly 450 appearances for the U's in midfield or on the right side of defence in his first stint with the club.

=== Plymouth Argyle ===
On 24 June 2008, Duguid ended his 14-year association with Colchester by signing a two-year contract with Championship club Plymouth Argyle, for an undisclosed fee. Duguid made his Argyle debut on 9 August 2008, starting the club's first league game of the 2008–09 season, against Wolverhampton Wanderers in a 2–2 draw. He soon became a fan favourite, and his first goal for the Pilgrims was a crucial one – it came at Watford in a 2–1 win, giving Argyle their first win of the season.

Argyle played Arsenal at the Emirates Stadium in an FA Cup 3rd Round tie on 3 January 2009. The hosts were 2–0 up after the break, but Duguid scored a consolation goal soon after, with Arsenal eventually winning 3–1. He began the 2009–10 season as a first-team regular once more and scored his second goal for the club against Newcastle United. At the end of the 2010–11 season, Duguid was one of nine first team players released by the club after being relegated to League Two.

=== Return to Colchester ===
Having spent time back with Colchester United for pre-season training, Duguid signed a one-year contract with the club on 20 July 2011. "It was not something that was in our minds – mine or Karl's – when he came here to train at the start of pre-season," said manager John Ward. "But we've had a chat and agreed on a one year deal for Karl to bolster the squad." On 14 February 2012, Duguid made his 400th league appearance for Colchester United in a home tie against Brentford which finished 2–1 to Colchester. One day after his 34th birthday, the U's veteran put pen to paper, signing a new one-year contract extension until summer 2013.

In December 2012, Duguid was appointed player-coach, helping manager Joe Dunne establish a link between the first-team squad and the youth-team and their development. On his 36th birthday, Duguid announced that he was to retire from playing at the end of the 2013–14 season. Until this point, he had not made a first-team appearance since a 2–2 draw with Shrewsbury Town in October 2012.

Duguid called time on his playing career in the 2013–14 season, and ended it by coming on as a substitute for Dominic Vose in a 1–0 win against Walsall on 3 May 2014. In October 2014, Duguid decided to step down from his coaching role at the club in a bid to return to playing.

Duguid was inducted to the Colchester United Hall of Fame at the annual Former Players' Dinner on 30 January 2016.

=== Stanway Rovers ===
After leaving his coaching position at Colchester on 22 October 2014, Duguid signed for Eastern Counties Football League side Stanway Rovers on 30 October. He made his debut for the club in an extra time victory over Hertford Town in the FA Vase, playing the full 120-minutes.

=== Welling United ===
On 28 January 2015, Duguid signed for Conference side Welling United. He made his debut on 31 January in Welling's 3–1 home defeat by Chester and went on to make two more appearances in defeats for Welling in February.

=== Return to Stanway ===
Duguid made a return to Stanway Rovers in March 2015 after three Conference appearances for Welling. He went straight back into the Rovers squad for their 3–1 home defeat by Hadleigh United.

=== Needham Market ===
Needham Market signed Duguid on 15 May 2015, three weeks after becoming champions of the Isthmian League Division One North. Duguid made eleven appearances for the club before being named as head coach of Needham's north site academy on 8 October 2015 alongside former Colchester teammate Kemal Izzet who was head coach of the south site academy, taking over the role from former Northern Ireland international Kevin Horlock.

=== Heybridge Swifts ===
Duguid joined Needham Market's divisional rivals Heybridge Swifts in May 2016. He left Needham Market after the club restructured its academy, effectively removing his role. He made no competitive appearances for Heybridge.

=== Stanway Rovers ===
During the 2016-17 season, Duguid made two league appearances for Stanway Rovers; he added three more during the following season before returning to Heybridge Swifts as assistant manager.

== Managerial career ==
In December 2016 Duguid was appointed manager at Stanway Rovers. In June 2018 he joined Heybridge Swifts as assistant manager. In July 2019 he became manager of the club. He left Heybridge in April 2020. He subsequently became assistant manager at Stanway in July 2021.

In October 2021 he was appointed joint manager of Coggeshall Town alongside Stuart Nethercott. He left the role in May 2022 to return to Stanway. He resigned from the Stanway job in September 2023.

== Career statistics ==
As of match played 19 September 2015.

Appearances and goals by club, season and competition
Club	Season	League			FA Cup		League Cup		Other		Total	
Club	Season	Division	Apps	Goals	Apps	Goals	Apps	Goals	Apps	Goals	Apps	Goals
Colchester United	1995–96	Third Division	16	1	0	0	0	0	1 (Note: Appearance in Football League Trophy)	0	17	1
Colchester United	1996–97	Third Division	19	3	0	0	2	0	0	0	21	3
Colchester United	1997–98	Third Division	21	3	4	0	0	0	3 (Note: Appearance in Football League play-offs)	0	28	3
Colchester United	1998–99	Second Division	33	4	1	0	1	0	0	0	35	4
Colchester United	1999–2000	Second Division	41	12	1	0	2	0	0	0	44	12
Colchester United	2000–01	Second Division	40	5	1	1	3	0	1	0	45	6
Colchester United	2001–02	Second Division	41	4	2	1	1	0	1	0	45	5
Colchester United	2002–03	Second Division	27	3	0	0	0	0	0	0	27	3
Colchester United	2003–04	Second Division	30	2	6	0	2	0	4	0	42	2
Colchester United	2004–05	League One	0	0	0	0	0	0	0	0	0	0
Colchester United	2005–06	League One	35	0	5	0	0	0	5	1	45	1
Colchester United	2006–07	Championship	43	5	1	0	1	0	–		45	5
Colchester United	2007–08	Championship	37	0	1	0	1	0	–		39	0
Colchester United	Total		383	42	22	2	11	0	15	1	431	45
Plymouth Argyle	2008–09	Championship	39	1	1	1	1	0	–		41	2
Plymouth Argyle	2009–10	Championship	42	1	2	0	1	0	–		45	1
Plymouth Argyle	2010–11	League One	26	0	1	0	1	0	1	0	29	0
Plymouth Argyle	Total		107	2	4	1	3	0	1	0	115	3
Colchester United	2011–12	League One	25	3	1	0	0	0	0	0	26	3
Colchester United	2012–13	League One	5	0	0	0	1	0	1	0	7	0
Colchester United	2013–14	League One	1	0	0	0	0	0	0	0	1	0
Colchester United	Total		31	3	1	0	1	0	1	0	34	3
Welling United	2014–15	National League	3	0	–		–		–		3	0
Needham Market	2015–16	Isthmian League Premier Division	11	0	2	0	–		0	0	13	0
Career total			535	47	29	3	15	0	17	1	596	51

== Honours ==
Colchester United

- Football League Third Division play-offs: 1998
- Football League One second-place promotion: 2005–06
- Football League Trophy runner-up: 1996–97

Individual

- Colchester United Player of the Year: 2002

Sporting positions
Preceded by	Colchester United F.C. Team Captain; 2005–2008	Succeeded by Chris Coyne
Preceded by Paul Wotton	Plymouth Argyle F.C. Team Captain; 2008–2009	Succeeded by Carl Fletcher
