= Simon Brown (footballer, born 1976) =

English footballer

Personal information
- Full name: Simon James Brown
- Date of birth: 3 December 1976 (age 49)
- Place of birth: Chelmsford, England
- Height: 1.88 m (6 ft 2 in)
- Position: Goalkeeper

Senior career*
Years	Team	Apps	(Gls)
1996–1999	Tottenham Hotspur	0	(0)
1997–1998	→ Lincoln City (loan)	1	(0)
1998	→ Fulham (loan)	0	(0)
1998	→ Kingstonian (loan)	3	(0)
1998	→ Gravesend & Northfleet (loan)		
1999	→ Aylesbury United (loan)	12	(1)
1999–2004	Colchester United	140	(0)
2004–2007	Hibernian	49	(0)
2007–2009	Brentford	27	(0)
2008–2009	→ Darlington (loan)	22	(0)
2009–2010	Northampton Town	2	(0)
2010–2012	Cambridge United	49	(0)
2012	Welling United	1	(0)
Total		307	(1)
- * Club domestic league appearances and goals

Simon James Brown (born 5 December 1976, in Chelmsford) is an English former footballer who played as a goalkeeper.

== Playing career ==
Brown started his career with Tottenham Hotspur as an apprentice but did not make a first team appearance at White Hart Lane. Instead, he spent several spells on loan at lower league clubs before signing for Colchester United in 1999. After five years and more than 100 starts for the Layer Road club, he moved north to join Hibernian in 2004. Brown struggled to hold down a regular place with Hibernian and was given a free transfer at the end of the 2006–07 season. Upon his exit from Hibs, Brown made a number of public criticisms of manager John Collins, claiming that his training techniques and vanity had alienated the squad during the latter half of his final season at the club.

Brentford manager Terry Butcher signed Brown on 25 June 2007. Brown was transfer listed at the end of his first season with the club. He joined Darlington in a five-month loan deal on 2 August 2008. After his loan spell at Darlington, Brown returned to Brentford after the five months to serve as back up for Ben Hamer who was on loan from Reading. Brown came on as a sub for Hamer on the second last day of the season against Darlington to help Brentford secure promotion to League One. Despite being offered a new deal, Brown left the club when his contract expired on 1 July.

On 11 September 2009, Brown signed with League Two side Northampton Town on a contract until January 2010. After making two appearances for the Cobblers, he signed for Cambridge United on a free transfer on 11 February 2010. On 3 January 2012 he left Cambridge United by mutual consent, joining Welling United. He debuted for the club in their 5–1 Conference South home victory over Truro City on 7 January 2012.

== Career statistics ==
Appearances and goals by club, season and competition
Club	Season	League			National Cup		League Cup		Europe		Other		Total	
Club	Season	Division	Apps	Goals	Apps	Goals	Apps	Goals	Apps	Goals	Apps	Goals	Apps	Goals
Tottenham Hotspur	1995–96	Premier League	0	0	0	0	0	0	0	0	―		0	0
Tottenham Hotspur	1996–97	Premier League	0	0	0	0	0	0	―		―		0	0
Tottenham Hotspur	1997–98	Premier League	0	0	0	0	0	0	―		―		0	0
Tottenham Hotspur	Total		0	0	0	0	0	0	0	0	―		0	0
Lincoln City (loan)	1997–98	Third Division	1	0	―		―		―		―		1	0
Fulham (loan)	1998–99	Second Division	0	0	―		0	0	―		―		0	0
Kingstonian (loan)	1998–99	Conference	3	0	―		―		―		1 (Note: Appearance in Conference League Cup)	0	4	0
Aylesbury United (loan)	1998–99	Isthmian League Premier Division	12	1	―		―		―		―		12	1
Colchester United	1999-00	Second Division	38	0	1	0	1	0	―		1 (Note: Appearances in Football League Trophy)	0	41	0
Colchester United	2000–01	Second Division	18	0	1	0	4	0	―		0	0	23	0
Colchester United	2001–02	Second Division	19	0	0	0	0	0	―		2	0	21	0
Colchester United	2002–03	Second Division	27	0	1	0	0	0	―		1	0	29	0
Colchester United	2003–04	Second Division	38	0	4	0	2	0	―		4	0	48	0
Colchester United	Total		140	0	7	0	7	0	―		8	0	162	0
Hibernian	2004–05	Scottish Premier League	38	0	4	0	2	0	2 (Note: Appearances in Intertoto Cup)	0	―		44	0
Hibernian	2005–06	Scottish Premier League	7	0	3	0	1	0	0	0	―		11	0
Hibernian	2006–07	Scottish Premier League	4	0	2	0	0	0	4	0	―		10	0
Hibernian	Total		49	0	9	0	3	0	6	0	―		67	0
Brentford	2007–08	League Two	26	0	1	0	0	0	―		1	0	28	0
Brentford	2008–09	League Two	1	0	―		―		―		―		1	0
Brentford	Total		27	0	1	0	0	0	―		1	0	29	0
Darlington (loan)	2008–09	League Two	22	0	1	0	2	0	―		1	0	26	0
Northampton Town	2009–10	League Two	2	0	0	0	0	0	―		0	0	2	0
Cambridge United	2009–10	Conference Premier	17	0	―		―		―		―		17	0
Cambridge United	2010–11	Conference Premier	32	0	0	0	―		―		0	0	32	0
Cambridge United	2011–12	Conference Premier	0	0	0	0	―		―		0	0	0	0
Cambridge United	Total		49	0	0	0	―		―		0	0	49	0
Welling United	2011–12	Conference Premier	1	0	―		―		―		―		1	0
Career total			306	1	18	0	12	0	6	0	11	0	353	1

== Honours ==
=== As a player ===
Hibernian

- Scottish League Cup: 2006–07

Brentford

- Football League Two: 2008–09

=== As an individual ===
- Colchester United Player of the Year: 2002–03
