= Simon Clark (English footballer) =

English footballer and manager (born 1967)

Personal information
- Date of birth: 12 March 1967 (age 59)
- Place of birth: Boston, Lincolnshire, England
- Height: 6 ft 1 in (1.85 m)
- Position: Defender

Team information
- Current team: AFC Wimbledon (Under-18's Lead Coach)

Senior career*
Years	Team	Apps	(Gls)
- Lincoln City
- Boston Town
- Holbeach United
- King's Lynn
- Hendon
1993–1994	Stevenage Borough	20	(2)
1994–1997	Peterborough United	107	(4)
1997–2000	Leyton Orient	98	(9)
2000–2002	Colchester United	55	(0)
2002–2004	Woodlands Wellington		
2005	King's Lynn		
2005	Maldon Town		
2005–2006	King's Lynn		

Managerial career
- 2003–2004: Woodlands Wellington
- 2005: Leyton
- 2009: Lincoln City (caretaker)
- 2010–2011: Stamford
- 2011–2013: Worksop Town
- 2018: King's Lynn Town
- * Club domestic league appearances and goals

Simon Clark (born 12 March 1967) is an English former professional footballer. He is currently the Lead Coach of the Under-18's AFC Wimbledon Academy team.

As a player, he turned out for Lincoln City, Boston Town, Holbeach United, King's Lynn, Hendon, Stevenage Borough, Peterborough United, Leyton Orient, Colchester United and Maldon Town. He has also spent time as manager of Singaporean side Woodlands Wellington where he was also a player and Leyton. In 2009, he briefly took over as caretaker manager of Football League Two side Lincoln City.

== Career ==
=== Playing career ===
Clark started his career as a junior with Lincoln City followed by spells in local non league football with Boston Town, Holbeach United and King's Lynn, Hendon.

He left Hendon with Paul Fairclough signing him for Stevenage Borough, Clark making his debut in the 2-0 Isthmian League victory at Dulwich Hamlet on 15 January 1994.

At the age of 27 Clark returned to professional football with a move to Peterborough United. After three years and 136 appearances at the club he moved on to Leyton Orient. At Orient he made 118 appearances over a three-year period. One of his most impressive performances was a hat trick against Doncaster Rover during his first season at the Os in 1997. He went on to be a vital part of the Orient defence and along with Dean Smith and Stuart Hicks.

Clark spent the next two seasons (64 appearances) at Colchester United. He captained the side and coached the club's under 17 team.

== Management & coaching career ==
After leaving Colchester he spent three years in Singapore as player coach and then player manager for Woodlands Wellington. While in Singapore Clark obtained the Asian Federation A licence as a coach, following up by obtaining the English FA, UEFA A qualification on his return to Europe. Simon returned to the UK in 2005 and joined King's Lynn as a player before taking on a player coach role at Maldon Town. On 1 September 2005 Clark was appointed player-manager at Isthmian League Premier Division club Leyton.

Clark joined the Lincoln City in the Centre of Excellence in April 2007 where he spent a year coaching before being appointed Centre of Excellence 9s-16s co-ordinator at Peterborough United. Whilst at the club he went on to coach the Youth team and reserve team as well as being the club's chief scout.

In January 2008, Clark rejoined Lincoln City again as a youth team coach. He later became chief scout and first team coach for the club. On 2 September 2009, Lincoln City's Board of Directors agreed to part company with Manager Peter Jackson and Assistant Manager Iffy Onuora with immediate effect with Clark being placed in temporary charge of the club. His first game in charge saw a 3–0 home victory over Darlington on 5 September 2009 but was followed by three defeats against league leaders Bournemouth, Notts County and Shrewsbury Town. Chris Sutton replaced him as manager on 28 September 2009. Clark took the 3–0 home defeat to Notts County on the following day before leaving the club by mutual consent.

Clark went on to working as a scout and match analyst for his former Peterborough United boss Darren Ferguson at Preston North End. In May 2010 he was appointed manager of Stamford.

Clark was appointed manager of King's Lynn Town in May 2018. Clark was sacked in September 2018 due to 1 win in 6.

On 6 March 2019, Clark was appointed as Lead Youth Development Phase coach for Northampton Town. In this position, he was going to oversee the development of players in the Northampton Town Academy from the age of 13 to 16.

== Honours ==
=== Club ===
Leyton Orient

- Football League Division Three Playoff Runner-up (1): 1998–99
