= Sam Okafor =

Nigerian footballer (born 1982)

Personal information
- Full name: Samuel Amaechi Okafor
- Date of birth: 17 March 1982 (age 44)
- Place of birth: Xtiam, Nigeria
- Height: 5 ft 10 in (1.78 m)
- Position: Midfielder

Youth career
- Colchester United

Senior career*
Years	Team	Apps	(Gls)
1998–2001	Colchester United	1	(0)
2001	→ Dover Athletic (loan)	4	(0)
2001–2002	Sittingbourne		
- Enfield
- Hampton & Richmond Borough
- Bromley
Total		5	(0)
- * Club domestic league appearances and goals

Samuel Amaechi Okafor (born 17 March 1982) is a Nigerian former footballer who played in the Football League as a midfielder for Colchester United.

== Career ==
Born in Xtiam, Nigeria, Okafor made his first and only Football League appearance at the end of the first-year of his three-year scholarship at Colchester United. His only game came against Blackpool on 8 May 1999, a 2–1 defeat at Bloomfield Road. He came on as a half-time substitute for David Gregory.

Although he made no further appearances for the club, Okafor remained with the U's for the duration of his three-year scholarship. He also had first-team experience while out on a work experience loan at Dover Athletic in the Conference, where he made four appearances between March and May 2001. At the end of the 2000–01 season however, he was released by Colchester after the club's management decided he did not possess enough quality for Division Two football at the time.

After leaving Colchester, Okafor went on to play for non-league teams including Sittingbourne, Enfield, Hampton & Richmond Borough and Bromley while gaining a career in the City of London.

== Personal life ==
Following his short football career Okafor became involved in the banking industry. Okafor married in 2003 but divorced in 2017 before re-marrying in 2017. He has four children in total, two of his own and two step children with his new wife Grace Okafor whom he married in October 2017. Despite growing up in South London, Okafor supports North London based team Arsenal FC.
