= Brian Launders =

Irish footballer

Personal information
- Date of birth: 8 June 1976 (age 50)
- Place of birth: Dublin, Ireland
- Position: Midfielder

Youth career
- Cherry Orchard

Senior career*
| Years | Team | Apps | (Gls) |
| 1991–1992 | Croydon Kings | 20 | (2) |
| 1993–1996 | Crystal Palace | 4 | (0) |
| 1996 | → Oldham Athletic (loan) | 0 | (0) |
| 1996–1997 | Crewe Alexandra | 9 | (0) |
| 1997–1998 | BV Veendam | 20 | (3) |
| 1998–1999 | Derby County | 1 | (0) |
| 1999 | → Colchester United (loan) | 1 | (0) |
| 1999 | Colchester United | 7 | (0) |
| 1999 | Crystal Palace | 2 | (0) |
| 1999–2000 | Sheffield United | 1 | (0) |
| 2004 | Croydon Kings | 1 | (0) |
| Total | | 66 | (5) |
- * Club domestic league appearances and goals

Brian Launders (born 8 June 1976) is an Irish former footballer who played as a midfielder. Born in Dublin, he began his career as a junior with Cherry Orchard in Ireland before moving to Australia to play for Croydon Kings. In 1993, he moved to England to play for Crystal Palace. He subsequently moved between a number of clubs in England, along with a spell in the Netherlands before eventually returning to Australia, where he finished his career.

== Career ==
=== Sheffield United ===
A free agent, Launders joined Sheffield United on trial in the autumn of 1999. Having been given a contract until the end of the season, he made his debut a few days later, coming on a substitute in a game against Stockport County on 20 November 1999. His debut only lasted ten minutes as he was himself substituted when he picked up an injury following a collision with an opposition player. When manager Adrian Heath was sacked shortly after, Launders was still suffering from concussion following his injury and was deemed unfit to undertake the medical required to finalise his contract and he was released.
