= Tony Lock (footballer) =

English footballer (born 1976)

Personal information
- Full name: Anthony Charles Lock
- Date of birth: 3 September 1976 (age 50)
- Place of birth: Harlow, England
- Position: Forward

Senior career*
Years	Team	Apps	(Gls)
1995–2001	Colchester United	102	(13)
1996	→ Chelmsford City (loan)	5	(2)
1999	→ Kettering Town (loan)	?	(?)
2001–2002	Dagenham & Redbridge	20	(4)
2002–2006	Grays Athletic	?	(?)
- * Club domestic league appearances and goals as of 23:00, 14 March 2012 (UTC)

Anthony Charles Lock (born 3 September 1976) is an English former footballer who played as a forward in The Football League.

== Career ==
Lock, born in Harlow, Essex, joined the Colchester United youth team and made his debut in 1995. He spent six years with the U's, making 102 appearances and scoring 13 goals. He had two loan spells, at Chelmsford City and Kettering Town. He was released in 2001 and subsequently joined Dagenham & Redbridge, where he made 20 appearances and scored four goals. He later went on to make appearances for Grays Athletic.

== Honours ==
Colchester United

- Football League Third Division play-offs: 1998
