= Part exchange =

Type of contract

A part exchange or part exchange deal is a type of contract. In a part exchange, instead of one party to the contract paying money and the other party supplying goods/services, both parties supply goods/services, the first party supplying part money and part goods/services.

Whether a part exchange is a sale or a barter is a fine point of law. It depends on whether a monetary value is assigned to the non-money goods supplied. Several cases at law clarify this. In the case of Flynn v Mackin and Mahon, (Note: Flynn v Mackin and Mahon, IR 101 (1974).) an old car was supplied in part exchange for a new car, along with £250. This was held to be a barter, because no monetary value was affixed to the old car. However, in Aldridge v Johnson, (Note: Aldridge v Johnson, 7 E&B 883 (1857).) a similar transaction was held to be a sale, because a monetary value was assigned to the item being exchanged (23 bullocks, valued at £192), and cash then used to make up the difference to the price of the item being purchased (100 quarters of barley, valued at £215). If the contract had been structured as "23 bullocks and £23 for 100 quarters of barley" then it could have qualified as barter. It is the affixture of the monetary value of £192 to the bullocks and £215 to the barley that made it a sale. Indeed, it is not necessary even for the contracting parties themselves to assign a monetary value to the goods for a part exchange deal to be held to be a sale. In Bull v Parker, (Note: Bull v Parker, 2 DOWL NS 345 (1842).) the court itself assigned a value (£4) for new riding equipment, sold for some old riding equipment and £2. If goods/services have obvious monetary values, then a part exchange deal can be held to be a sale.

It was held in Aldridge v Johnson that there were in fact two separate contracts, both of sale, rather than a single contract of barter. And this is one way that part exchange deals are viewed. Indeed, this is how they are always viewed in the United Kingdom for V.A.T. purposes. A supply of an old car in part exchange for a new one, at a car dealership, is two separate sales, and must be recorded by the dealer as such in account books, for V.A.T. purposes. Technically, the customer is making a "supply" for the discount given, providing the old car for an amount equal to the monetary discount, and the dealer is also making a "supply" for the full price, providing the new car for its full sale price.

Car dealerships are one business sector where part exchange deals are common. They are less common in other sectors. In the housing sector, for example, only a few businesses will make part exchange deals. One such is Barratt Homes, where the part exchange deal, with buyers being offered discounts for part exchange of their old houses, has in fact been an integral part of the company's business model. There is another accounting nicety for the house builder in such deals, relating to when, exactly, to take the profit on the deal. House prices change over time, and it is possible that the housebuilder may not be able to eventually sell the old, exchanged, property for the same or more than the value that it was originally exchanged for. There are two extreme views on how to render accounts for such deals, and most accounting practices fall somewhere in the spectrum in between. The one extreme has the profit on the deal taken straightaway that the new house is sold, on the presumption that the old house will sell for its exchange value. The other extreme has the profit on the deal not taken at all until the entire deal has completed, including the sale onwards of the old house received in exchange. The major accounting considerations are making provisions at year's end for part exchange stock that remains unsold, and for the predicted marketing costs of selling it.
