= Ross Johnson (English footballer) =

English footballer (born 1976)

Personal information
- Full name: Ross Yorke Johnson
- Date of birth: 2 January 1976 (age 50)
- Place of birth: Brighton, England
- Height: 6 ft 0 in (1.83 m)
- Position: Defender

Senior career*
Years	Team	Apps	(Gls)
1994–2000	Brighton & Hove Albion	132	(2)
2000	→ Colchester United (loan)	6	(0)
2000–2002	Colchester United	46	(1)
2002	Dagenham & Redbridge	7	(0)
2002–2003	Canvey Island	?	(?)
2003–2004	Worthing	?	(?)
2004	Eastbourne Borough	1	(0)
- * Club domestic league appearances and goals

Ross Yorke Johnson (born 2 January 1976) is an English former footballer who played mostly as a defender. He played in the Football League for Brighton & Hove Albion and Colchester United, and also played non-league football with Dagenham & Redbridge, Canvey Island, Worthing and Eastbourne Borough.

== Career ==
Born in Brighton, Johnson started his senior career at Brighton & Hove Albion in 1994. His first two goals for the club came on 5 February 2009; a 55th-minute header from a corner followed by his second goal after 86 minutes, also from a corner, in a 2–2 draw away to Swansea City. Over six years at Brighton, he appeared 132 times in the league, scoring twice.

In January 2000, Johnson joined Colchester United on a one-month loan, making six appearances during his month at the club. Following his loan spell at Colchester, he joined Colchester permanently on a free transfer, signing a two-and-a-half-year contract with the club. He appeared 46 times for Colchester over this spell at the club, scoring once, before being released at the end of his contract in 2002.

Following his release, Johnson signed for Dagenham & Redbridge, though Johnson left Dagenham & Redbridge in September 2002 after 7 appearances, joining Isthmian League side Canvey Island.

In the summer of 2003, Johnson signed for fellow Isthmian League side Worthing, making his debut for the club in a 1–1 draw against Windsor & Eton in August 2003. He joined Conference South side Eastbourne Borough in the summer of 2004 before leaving later that year by mutual consent after just one game.
