= Peter Heard =

British football administrator (died 2026)

Peter Heard (1938 or 1939 – 27 June 2026) was president and chairman of Colchester United Football Club, a Football Association councillor and FA board member. He was born in Colchester, and used to be a referee.

Heard oversaw Colchester's rise from the fourth tier to the Championship. As the representative for Football League Division One he failed in his attempt to be re-elected to the FA Board after Colchester were promoted to the Championship in 2006, but became a life member of the English Football League. Heard also served as acting chairman of the English Football League. He sold his controlling stake in the club to Robbie Cowling in August 2006, although he remained as chairman. He resigned as chairman in July 2007 and became life president of the club in 2008.

Heard was a qualified chartered surveyor. Along with Don Churston, Heard founded the independent retail agency Churston Heard in 1975. Churston Heard was sold to Jones Lang LaSalle in 2008 for £20 million. At the time of the sale, the company had grown to one of the largest retail property consultancies in the UK and employed 80 people. It is estimated that more than 30 independent agencies and property companies formed out of Churston Heard.

Peter Heard died on 27 June 2026, aged 87..
