= Terry Westley =

English football coach & manager (born 1959)

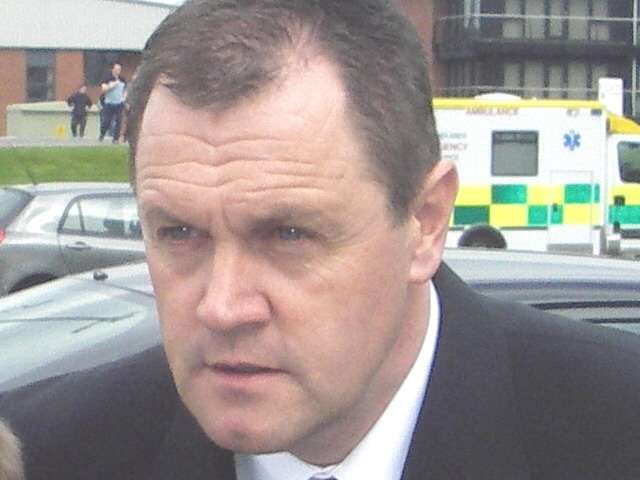
- Westley with Derby County in 2006

Personal information
- Full name: Terence Westley
- Date of birth: 18 September 1959 (age 67)
- Place of birth: Ipswich, England

Managerial career
- Years: Team
- 1995: Luton Town
- 2006: Derby County

Terence Westley (born 18 September 1959) is an association football coach and manager. Until 2011 he was the Academy Director at Birmingham City and in July 2014 he was appointed to a similar role with West Ham United. He has had brief spells as manager at Luton Town in 1995 and Derby County in 2006.

== Coaching and managerial career ==
Westley previously worked at Rushden & Diamonds, Ipswich Town, Charlton Athletic, Luton Town and Derby County. At these clubs he was responsible for developing young players, who included Matthew Upson, Kieron Dyer, Richard Wright, Titus Bramble and Kevin Lisbie. At Derby, he oversaw the development of young stars such as Tom Huddlestone, Lee Holmes, Giles Barnes, Lewin Nyatanga and Miles Addison.

Westley took the helm at Luton Town in July 1995 after the departure of David Pleat. He saw out the 1994–95 football season with Luton Town finishing 16th in Division 1. The following season did not get off to a good start and Westley was sacked after a 0–4 defeat at Portsmouth.

Westley was made caretaker manager of Derby County in January 2006 following the departure of Phil Brown. He lost his first game in charge 1–0 at home to Sheffield United and despite not managing a win in four further outings, was made manager until the end of the season. His first victory was a 1–0 home win over Plymouth Argyle just two days later. Despite achieving his objective of keeping the club in the Championship by the end of the season he was not offered the job of permanent manager, instead being replaced by Billy Davies.

He joined Birmingham City as director of their youth academy in 2006. In his first season, he led the under-18 side to the quarter-final of the FA Youth Cup, and two years later they reached the semi-final of the same competition. After completing a report to the club's board of directors, which contained recommendations needed to "push [the Academy] to the next level", Westley left the club by mutual consent in February 2011.

In July 2014 Westley became academy director at West Ham United, replacing long-term incumbent, Tony Carr.

== Performance by club ==
Team	From	To	Record				
Team	From	To	P	W	L	D	Win %
Luton Town	3 July 1995	18 December 1995	24	4	7	13	16.67
Derby County	30 January 2006	2 June 2006	16	4	6	6	25.00
Total			40	8	13	19	20.00
