= Paul Danson =

English football referee

- Full name: Paul S. Danson
- Born: 2 May 1958 (age 68); Leicestershire, England

Domestic
Years	League	Role
? – ?	Leics. Senior League	Referee
? –1987	Southern League	Referee
1984–1987	Football League	Asst. referee
1987–1994	Football League	Referee
1994–1997	Premier League	Referee
1997–2005	Football League	Referee
2005–2006	Football League	Asst. referee

International
Years	League	Role
?	FIFA	Fourth official
?	FIFA	Asst. referee

Paul S. Danson (born 2 May 1958, Leicestershire) is an English former association football referee in the Football League and Premier League. During his time on the List, he was based in Leicester.

== Career ==
In 1972, he qualified as a referee, progressing through the Leicestershire Senior League and the Southern League. He became a Football League linesman in 1984, graduating to the Football League referees list three years later, at the age of only twenty-nine.

His major breakthrough came in 1994. He was one of three new referees appointed to the Premier List along with fellow Leicestershire official Peter Jones and Gary Willard from Sussex. Over the next three seasons all his league games were at Premiership level (as was standard for Premiership referees at the time). However, his performances did not always find favour – most notably a game at Highbury between Arsenal and Sunderland on 28 September 1996,^{†} when two away players and the Sunderland manager were sent off before half-time. At the end of the 1996–97 season he was dropped from the Premier List and reverted to Football League level.

For the next few years he was one of its senior officials, often receiving key appointments such as an old First Division play-off semi-final on 17 May 2001 at Deepdale, where Preston beat Birmingham after extra-time and penalties (Preston had already missed a spot-kick during the regulation 90 minutes). The then Birmingham manager Trevor Francis was said to be "visibly furious" after Danson moved the location of the penalty shootout from the empty end of the ground to the goal behind which the Preston fans were situated (on police advice), and he removed his players from the field in protest for a short while.

Following a Football League Championship match between Crystal Palace and West Bromwich Albion at Selhurst Park on 20 September 2003, he had to attend hospital in Croydon (Surrey) for treatment, due to being hit in the mouth and rendered unconscious whilst dealing with a three-man altercation on the pitch during the match, which ended 2–2 and generated eight cautions.

Matters took a very different turn in the 2004–05 season. He refereed only three games in the top division of the Football League and was largely on lower division duty. At the end of that season, he lost his place on the League List after a tenure of eighteen years. Potentially he could have had another two years before retirement and had that happened, he would have completed twenty years and become the longest-serving referee since the 1920s.^{‡} However, he did gain experience in Europe as a fourth official and assistant referee.

He returned to the assistants' list for the first time since 1987, although he did handle three games as a referee in the Football Conference North in season 2005–06 before finishing his top-class career completely.
