= Craig Farley =

English footballer

Personal information
- Date of birth: 17 March 1981 (age 45)
- Place of birth: Oxford, England
- Position: Defender

Youth career
- Watford

Senior career*
Years	Team	Apps	(Gls)
1998–1999	Watford	0	(0)
1999–2000	Colchester United	14	(0)
2000–?	Chesham United		
- Oxford City
- * Club domestic league appearances and goals

Craig Farley (born 17 March 1981) is an English footballer who played in The Football League as a defender.

== Career ==
Farley began his career at Watford where he made no first team appearances, before moving on to Colchester United. He made 14 league appearances for the U's, before being released at the end of the 1999–2000 season to join Chesham United. Later, he also made appearances for hometown club Oxford City.
