= Chris Keeble (footballer) =

English footballer

Personal information
- Date of birth: 17 September 1978 (age 48)
- Place of birth: Colchester, England
- Height: 1.78 m (5 ft 10 in)
- Position: Midfielder

Youth career
- Ipswich Town

Senior career*
Years	Team	Apps	(Gls)
1997–2000	Ipswich Town	1	(0)
2000–2003	Colchester United	24	(2)
2003–?	Heybridge Swifts	?	(?)
Total		25	(2)
- * Club domestic league appearances and goals

Chris Keeble (born 17 September 1978) is an English former professional footballer who played in The Football League as a midfielder.

== Career ==
Keeble began his career at Ipswich Town, making his debut against Port Vale in December 1997. In March 2000, Keeble joined Colchester United on a permanent basis. In May 2001, Keeble injured his Achilles tendon in a match against Wycombe Wanderers. Having been troubled by injury for more than a year and put into the reserve team, Keeble was released by Colchester in 2003 after not being offered a new contract. He then dropped out of the football league to join Heybridge Swifts.

He is the son of centre-forward Vic Keeble, who played for Colchester United, Newcastle United and West Ham United in the 1940s and 1950s.
