= Paul Rejer =

English football referee

- Full name: Paul Rejer
- Born: 16 May 1954 (age 72); Dudley, Worcestershire, England, UK

Domestic
Years	League	Role
1986–1994	Football League	Linesman
1992–1994	Premier League	Linesman
1994–2003	Football League	Referee

International
Years	League	Role
1992–1994	FIFA listed	Linesman

Paul Rejer (born 16 May 1954) is an English former football referee.

== Career ==
He began refereeing in 1978 in leagues local to his home, becoming an assistant referee in the Football League in 1986. In 1992, he progressed to the Premier League list of assistants, the first season of the league. Also the FIFA Linesmen’s List, the very first year of FIFA Linesman. He was elevated to the Referees List in the Football League in 1994. He was fortunate to have officiated as a Referee or Assistant Referee at all 92 professional clubs in England.

His first match in charge after his promotion in 1994 was the Football League Third Division (now League Two) encounter between Barnet and Scunthorpe United at Underhill Stadium on 13 August 1994, which finished 2-1 to the away side.

He was Linesman in the FA Challenge Cup at Wembley Stadium in 1994 between Manchester United and Chelsea (4-0). His other appearance at Wembley was in the FA Charity Shield in 1991 between Arsenal and Tottenham Hotspur F.C. He was Linesman in the UEFA Cup Final in 1992 between Torino and Ajax (2-2). He also officiated in three World Cup qualifying games and three UEFA Champions League games. He officiated in two FA Cup Semi Finals 1991, Nottingham Forest v West Ham United, 1993 Arsenal v Tottenham Hotspur F.C. and two League Cup Semi Finals. In 1997, he refereed an FA Trophy semi-final and two FA Vase Semi Finals, in 1996, Mangotsfield United v Clitheroe and Tiverton Town and Taunton Town in 1999 Other significant games he has been involved in during his career: 2 League Cup Semi Finals – 4th Official, 1996 League One Play Off Semi Final – 4th Official, 1998 League One Play Off Semi Final – 4th Official. 1994 Staffordshire County FA Senior Cup Final - Referee LDV Vans Final, 2003– 4th Official.

In August 2003 he retired from active refereeing and became an assessor on the football league. Then in 2004 he was appointed Select Group Assistant Referee Coach, coaching the Assistant Referee’s who operate on the Premier League. At the same time he became an assessor on the Premier League. In 2007, he was promoted to Select Group Assistant referee Manager. The Assistant Referee’s Darren Cann and Mike Mullarkey, who were the World Cup Assistant Referee’s in South Africa and the European Champions League final, both in 2010, gave him ‘significant’ credit for their development. Howard Webb also made reference to the help Paul had been to him personally.

In November 2012 he was appointed Training and Development Manager for the Professional Referees Organization (PRO), responsible for all the match officials that operate in Major League Soccer (MLS), in the USA based in New York City.

He is an expert in the Laws of the Game, particularly Law 11 (Offside), and is consulted whenever there are law changes to deliver interpretations.

Rejer has been an international refereeing instructor. For the English Premier League and the British Council, Rejer conducted training programs under the name of "Premier Skills" along with Keith Hackett in countries such as Cameroon, Ethiopia, Malaysia, Kenya, and Nigeria from 2011 to 2012. In addition to that, he has been a keynote speaker in refereeing seminars organized by Football Association of Ireland, the Scottish Football Association, the Football Association of Wales, and the Soccer Nation Expo in the USA.
