= Aaron Skelton =

English footballer

Personal information
- Date of birth: 22 November 1974 (age 51)
- Place of birth: Welwyn Garden City, United Kingdom
- Height: 5 ft 10 in (1.78 m)
- Positions: Midfielder; defender

Team information
- Current team: Poole Town

Senior career*
Years	Team	Apps	(Gls)
1992–1997	Luton Town	5	(0)
1997–2001	Colchester United	113	(17)
2001–2003	Luton Town	14	(2)
2003–2004	Havant & Waterlooville	32	(0)
2006–	Poole Town	151	(8)
- * Club domestic league appearances and goals as of 7 August 2009

Aaron Skelton (born 22 November 1974 in Welwyn Garden City) is a former professional footballer who played at right-back, right-wing, center-midfield and center-back during his time at Luton Town and Colchester.

His More recent achievement, on 15 July 2022, Aaron joined a team of 4 military veterans on the rowing boat Ellida to cross the English Channel from Cherbourg to Poole. This 66 nautical mile trip ended on 16 July after 38.5 hours at sea, with strong winds and tides resulting in a 109-mile row and a Successful crossing. This is a world record having never been completed before. The challenge was created by Adam Elcock MBE and in aid of Injured serviceman in support of the Pilgrim Bandits Charity.

Prior to this, injured serviceman rowed across the channel to also be the first to go from Poole to Cherbourg in a rowing boat, with a team of 5 and only 3 working legs between them.

== Career ==
He joined Luton as an apprentice and became a squad member over his five years at the club. He only made eight appearances in the league before he was given a free transfer to Colchester. He became a vital member of their side, and after running his contract down in 2000/01, he re-joined relegated Luton to become captain. Injuries stopped Aaron from becoming a key player at Luton and he was released again in 2003. Upon his release he signed for Havant & Waterlooville where after only one season he was forced to quit due to injures. However, he made a comeback in 2006, when he signed for Poole Town. As of 2011 he has made over 150 appearances for the club.

== Honours ==
Colchester United

- Football League Third Division play-offs: 1998

Luton Town

- Football League Third Division second-place promotion: 2001–02
