= Gavin Johnson (footballer) =

English footballer

Personal information
- Full name: Gavin Johnson
- Date of birth: 10 October 1970 (age 56)
- Place of birth: Stowmarket, England
- Positions: Left-back; midfielder

Senior career*
Years	Team	Apps	(Gls)
1989–1995	Ipswich Town	131	(10)
1995	Luton Town	5	(0)
1995–1998	Wigan Athletic	98	(10)
1998–1999	Dunfermline Athletic	18	(0)
1999–2005	Colchester United	146	(13)
2005	Boston United	4	(0)
2005–2006	Northampton Town	24	(1)
2006–2007	Oxford United	29	(1)
2007–2010	Bury Town	83	(8)
2010–2011	Walsham-le-Willows	?	(?)
2011–2012	Needham Market	0	(0)
2012–2013	Walsham-le-Willows	?	(?)
Total		538	(43)
- * Club domestic league appearances and goals as of 08:12, 26 July 2011 (UTC)

Gavin Johnson (born 10 October 1970) is an English former professional footballer who played as a left-back or midfielder.

== Career ==
Born in Stowmarket, Johnson started his career with nearby Ipswich Town, making his debut in a 2–0 win over Barnsley on 21 February 1989. He moved on to Luton Town in 1995, but was sold to Wigan Athletic for £15,000 in the same year. After three years at Wigan, he spent a season in Scotland with Dunfermline Athletic, before returning to East Anglia to join Colchester United in 1999.

After being released by Colchester in 2005 he had a brief spell with Boston United, before spending a season with Northampton Town and then Oxford United. In 2007, he returned to Suffolk to play for Bury Town, before moving onto Walsham-le-Willows in 2010.

At the start of the 2011–12 season, Johnson signed for Isthmian League Division One North club Needham Market.

== Honours ==
Ipswich Town

- Football League Second Division: 1991–92

Wigan Athletic

- Football League Third Division: 1996–97

Northampton Town

- Football League Two second-place promotion: 2005–06
