= 2000–01 Manchester City F.C. season =

English football club season

Manchester City F.C.
2000–01 season
- Owner: Publicly traded company
- Chairman: David Bernstein
- Manager: Joe Royle
- Stadium: Maine Road
- Premier League: 18th (relegated)
- FA Cup: Fifth round
- League Cup: Fifth round
- Top goalscorer: League: Paulo Wanchope (9 goals); All: Shaun Goater (11 goals)
- Highest home attendance: 34,629 vs Liverpool, Premier League, 31 January 2001
- Lowest home attendance: 17,408 vs Gillingham, League Cup, 20 September 2001
- Average home league attendance: 34,058
Home colours	Away colours	Third colours

The 2000–01 season was Manchester City Football Club's 109th season playing in a division of English football, most of which have been spent in the top flight. The club spent this season playing in the Premier League after winning successive promotions from the Second Division and First Division in the previous two seasons. This was the club's fifth season playing in the Premier League since its initial formation as the top tier of English football eight years earlier, with Manchester City as one of its original 22 founding member clubs.

== Season review ==
Manchester City's return to the Premiership after a four-year exile was the result of back-to-back promotions from the Second Division. But perhaps the team's two-tier climb back to the top flight again had been a little too rapid because it became apparent after just a few games into the new season that Joe Royle's men would be struggling to hang on to their newly acquired top flight status. After their first ten games though, they were enjoying reasonably stable mid-table form with four wins and defeats each; however, after a 5–0 humbling at Arsenal, it all went wrong and only four wins were achieved during the remainder of the season.

The team's relegation was confirmed by a defeat in the penultimate game of the season, and manager Royle, who had been the guiding hand that had brought the team so quickly back to the Premiership from the Second Division, was dismissed within days. Former England coach Kevin Keegan was appointed to replace Royle on a three-year contract and fans were given renewed hope of an immediate return to the elite.

== Team kit ==
The team kit was produced by Le Coq Sportif and the shirt sponsor was Eidos Interactive.

Home	Home alt.	Home alt. 2	Away	Third

== Historical league performance ==
Prior to this season, the history of Manchester City's performance in the English football league hierarchy since the creation of the Premier League in 1992 is summarised by the following timeline chart – which commences with the last season (1991–92) of the old Football League First Division (from which the Premier League was formed).

== Final league table ==
Pos	Team	Pld	W	D	L	GF	GA	GD	Pts	Qualification or relegation
16	Everton	38	11	9	18	45	59	−14	42	
17	Derby County	38	10	12	16	37	59	−22	42	
18	Manchester City (R)	38	8	10	20	41	65	−24	34	Relegation to the Football League First Division
19	Coventry City (R)	38	8	10	20	36	63	−27	34	Relegation to the Football League First Division
20	Bradford City (R)	38	5	11	22	30	70	−40	26	Relegation to the Football League First Division

Source: Premier League
Rules for classification: 1) points; 2) goal difference; 3) number of goals scored.
(R) Relegated

Results summary

Overall								Home						Away					
Pld	W	D	L	GF	GA	GD	Pts	W	D	L	GF	GA	GD	W	D	L	GF	GA	GD
38	8	10	20	41	65	−24	34	4	3	12	20	31	−11	4	7	8	21	34	−13

Source: 2000–01 FA Premier League table

Results by round

Round	1	2	3	4	5	6	7	8	9	10	11	12	13	14	15	16	17	18	19	20	21	22	23	24	25	26	27	28	29	30	31	32	33	34	35	36	37	38
Ground	A	H	H	A	A	H	A	H	H	A	A	H	A	H	H	A	H	A	A	H	H	A	H	A	H	A	H	A	H	A	H	A	H	A	A	H	A	H
Result	L	W	L	W	L	D	D	L	W	W	L	L	L	L	L	L	W	D	L	D	L	D	L	D	D	D	L	W	L	D	L	L	L	W	D	W	L	L
Position	20	15	16	7	11	12	12	14	12	10	13	13	16	16	16	16	16	16	17	17	19	19	19	18	18	18	18	18	18	18	18	19	19	18	19	18	18	18

Source: 11v11.com: 2000–01 Manchester City results
A = Away; H = Home; W = Win; D = Draw; L = Loss

== Results ==
Manchester City's score comes first

=== Legend ===
Win	Draw	Loss

=== FA Premier League ===
19 August 2000 1	Charlton Athletic	4–0	Manchester City	Charlton, England
	Andy Hunt; John Robinson; Mark Kinsella; Graham Stuart	(Report)		Stadium: The Valley; Attendance: 20,039; Referee: R Harris (Oxford)

23 August 2000 2	Manchester City	4–2	Sunderland	Manchester, Greater Manchester
	Wanchope; Haaland; Wanchope; Wanchope	(Report)	Quinn; Phillips	Stadium: Maine Road; Attendance: 34,410; Referee: D Elleray (Harrow-on-the-Hill)

26 August 2000 3	Manchester City	1–2	Coventry City	Manchester, Greater Manchester
	Horlock	(Report)	Edghill (o.g.); Bellamy	Stadium: Maine Road; Attendance: 34,140; Referee: A D'Urso (Billericay)

5 September 2000 4	Leeds United	1–2	Manchester City	Leeds, England
	Bowyer	(Report)	Howey; Wiekens	Stadium: Elland Road; Attendance: 40,055; Referee: G Poll (Tring)

9 September 2000 5	Liverpool	3–2	Manchester City	Liverpool, England
	Owen; Hamann; Hamann	(Report)	Weah; Horlock (pen.)	Stadium: Anfield; Attendance: 44,692; Referee: G Barber (Tring)

17 September 2000 6	Manchester City	1–1	Middlesbrough	Manchester, Greater Manchester
	Wanchope	(Report)	Festa	Stadium: Maine Road; Attendance: 32,053; Referee: S Lodge (Barnsley)

23 September 2000 7	Tottenham Hotspur	0–0	Manchester City	London England
		(Report)		Stadium: White Hart Lane; Attendance: 36,069; Referee: S Bennett (Orpington)

30 September 2000 8	Manchester City	0–1	Newcastle United	Manchester, Greater Manchester
		(Report)	Alan Shearer 74'	Stadium: Maine Road; Attendance: 34,497; Referee: P Taylor (Cheshunt)

14 October 2000 9	Manchester City	2–0	Bradford City	Manchester, Greater Manchester
	Dickov; Haaland	(Report)		Stadium: Maine Road; Attendance: 34,229; Referee: B Knight (Orpington)

23 October 2000 10	Southampton	0–2	Manchester City	Southampton, England
		(Report)	Dickov; Tiatto	Stadium: The Dell; Attendance: 15,056; Referee: A Wiley (Burntwood)

28 October 2000 11	Arsenal	5–0	Manchester City	London
	Cole 44'; Bergkamp 52'; Wiltord 75'; Henry 82', 88'	(Report)		Stadium: Highbury; Attendance: 38,049; Referee: Rob Styles

4 November 2000 12	Manchester City	0–1	Leicester City	Manchester, Greater Manchester
		(Report)	Savage	Stadium: Maine Road; Attendance: 34,279; Referee: M Halsey (Welwyn Garden City)

11 November 2000 13	West Ham United	4–1	Manchester City	London
15:00 BST	Winterburn (yellow card) 39'; Lomas 53'; Sinclair 58'; Pearce 67'; Di Canio 90' (pen.)	(Report)	Prior 32'	Stadium: Boleyn Ground; Attendance: 26,022; Referee: Jeff Winter

18 November 2000 14	Manchester City	0–1	Manchester United	Manchester, Greater Manchester
		(Report)	Beckham 2'	Stadium: Maine Road; Attendance: 34,429; Referee: S Dunn (Bristol)

25 November 2000 15	Manchester City	2–3	Ipswich Town	Manchester, Greater Manchester
	Wanchope 71'; Howey 81'	(Report)	Stewart 9', 53'; Hreiðarsson 32'	Stadium: Maine Road; Attendance: 33,741; Referee: M Dean (The Wirral)

3 December 2000 16	Chelsea	2–1	Manchester City	Fulham, London
	Zola 28'; Hasselbaink 45'	(Report)	Dickov 82'	Stadium: Stamford Bridge; Attendance: 34,971; Referee: Dermot Gallagher

9 December 2000 17	Manchester City	5–0	Everton	Manchester, Greater Manchester
	Wanchope; Howey; Goater; Dickov; Naysmith (o.g.)	(Report)		Stadium: Maine Road; Attendance: 34,516; Referee: S Bennett (Orpington)

16 December 2000 18	Aston Villa	2–2	Manchester City	Birmingham, England
	Dublin; Ginola	(Report)	Haaland; Wanchope	Stadium: Villa Park; Attendance: 29,281; Referee: A D'Urso (Billericay)

23 December 2000 19	Sunderland	1–0	Manchester City	Sunderland, England
	Hutchison	(Report)		Stadium: Stadium of Light; Attendance: 47,475; Referee: D Elleray (Harrow-on-the-Hill)

26 December 2000 20	Manchester City	0–0	Derby County	Manchester, Greater Manchester
		(Report)		Stadium: Maine Road; Attendance: 34,321; Referee: M Riley (Leeds)

30 December 2000 21	Manchester City	1–4	Charlton Athletic	Manchester, Greater Manchester
	Huckerby (pen.)	(Report)	Johansson; Johansson; Stuart (pen.); Jensen	Stadium: Maine Road; Attendance: 33,280; Referee: C Wilkes (Gloucester)

1 January 2001 22	Coventry City	1–1	Manchester City	Coventry, England
	Edworthy	(Report)	Wanchope	Stadium: Highfield Road; Attendance: 21,999; Referee: B Knight (Orpington)

13 January 2001 23	Manchester City	0–4	Leeds United	Manchester, Greater Manchester
		(Report)	Bakke 34'; Bowyer 80'; Keane 90', 90'	Stadium: Maine Road; Attendance: 34,288; Referee: Mike Dean

20 January 2001 24	Derby County	1–1	Manchester City	Derby, England
	Powell	(Report)	Howey	Stadium: Pride Park; Attendance: 31,174; Referee: J Winter (Stockton-on-Tees)

31 January 2001 25	Manchester City	1–1	Liverpool	Manchester, Greater Manchester
	Tiatto 48'	(Report)	Heskey 43'	Stadium: Maine Road; Attendance: 34,629; Referee: S Dunn (Bristol)

3 February 2001 26	Middlesbrough	1–1	Manchester City	Middlesbrough, England
	Cooper	(Report)	Vickers (o.g.)	Stadium: Riverside Stadium; Attendance: 31,794; Referee: A Wiley (Burntwood)

10 February 2001 27	Manchester City	0–1	Tottenham Hotspur	Manchester, Greater Manchester
		(Report)	Rebrov	Stadium: Maine Road; Attendance: 34,399; Referee: S Dunn (Bristol)

24 February 2001 28	Newcastle United	0–1	Manchester City	Newcastle upon Tyne
		(Report)	Goater 61'	Stadium: St James' Park; Attendance: 51,981; Referee: Rob Harris

3 March 2001 29	Manchester City	0–1	Southampton	Manchester, Greater Manchester
		(Report)	Petrescu	Stadium: Maine Road; Attendance: 33,990; Referee: S Dunn (Bristol)

17 March 2001 30	Bradford City	2–2	Manchester City	Bradford, England
	Blake; Ward	(Report)	Wiekens; Goater	Stadium: Valley Parade; Attendance: 19,117; Referee: S Dunn (Bristol)

31 March 2001 31	Manchester City	1–3	Aston Villa	Manchester, Greater Manchester
	Goater	(Report)	Merson; Dublin; Hendrie	Stadium: Maine Road; Attendance: 34,247; Referee: R Styles (Waterlooville)

8 April 2001 32	Everton	3–1	Manchester City	Liverpool, England
	Ferguson; Ball; Weir	(Report)	Whitley	Stadium: Goodison Park; Attendance: 36,561; Referee: D Elleray (Harrow-on-the-Hill)

11 April 2001 33	Manchester City	0–4	Arsenal	Manchester, Greater Manchester
		(Report)	8', 16' Ljungberg; 8' Wiltord; 36' Kanu	Stadium: Maine Road; Attendance: 33,444; Referee: Neale Barry

14 April 2001 34	Leicester City	1–2	Manchester City	Leicester, England
	Akinbiyi	(Report)	Goater; Wanchope	Stadium: Filbert Street; Attendance: 20,224; Referee: B Knight (Orpington)

21 April 2001 35	Manchester United	1–1	Manchester City	Greater Manchester
	Sheringham 71' (pen.)	(Report)	Howey	Stadium: Old Trafford; Attendance: 67,535; Referee: D Elleray (Harrow-on-the-Hill)

28 April 2001 36	Manchester City	1–0	West Ham United	Manchester, Greater Manchester
	Pearce 23' (own goal); Haaland (yellow card) 64'; Howey (yellow card) 67'; Tiatto (yellow card) 82'	(Report)	Cole (yellow card) 39'; Dailly (yellow card) 53'; Pearce (yellow card) 63'; Carrick (yellow card) 82'; Šuker (yellow card) 90'	Stadium: Maine Road; Attendance: 33,737; Referee: Peter Jones

7 May 2001 37	Ipswich Town	2–1	Manchester City	Ipswich, Suffolk
	Holland 78'; Reuser 85'	(Report)	Goater 74'	Stadium: Portman Road; Attendance: 25,004; Referee: Steve Lodge

19 May 2001 38	Manchester City	1–2	Chelsea	Manchester, Greater Manchester
	Howey 39'	(Report)	Wise 19'; Hasselbaink 62'	Stadium: Maine Road; Attendance: 34,479; Referee: Mike Riley

=== FA Cup ===
6 January 2001 3	Manchester City	3–2	Birmingham City	Manchester, Greater Manchester
	Morrison; Huckerby; Goater (pen.)	(Report)	Grainger 57'; Adebola 61'	Stadium: Maine Road; Attendance: 19,380; Referee: M Messias

27 January 2001 4	Manchester City	1–0	Coventry City	Manchester, Greater Manchester
	Goater	(Report)		Stadium: Maine Road; Attendance: 24,637; Referee: D Elleray (Harrow-on-the-Hill)

18 February 2001 5	Liverpool	4–2	Manchester City	Liverpool, Merseyside
	Litmanen 7' (pen.); Heskey 13'; Šmicer 54' (pen.); Babbel 85'	(Report)	Kanchelskis 29'; Goater 90'	Stadium: Anfield; Attendance: 36,231; Referee: Graham Poll

=== League Cup ===
20 September 2000 2 (1st Leg)	Manchester City	1–1	Gillingham	Manchester, Greater Manchester
	Weah	(Report)	Smith	Stadium: Maine Road; Attendance: 17,408; Referee: D Pugh (Bebington)

26 September 2000 2 (2nd Leg)	Gillingham	2–4 (3–5 agg.)	Manchester City	Gillingham, Kent
	Thomson; Thomson	(Report)	Weah; Weah; Dickov; Kennedy	Stadium: Priestfield Stadium; Attendance: 6,520; Referee: R Furnandiz (Doncaster)

1 November 2000 3	Aston Villa	0–1	Manchester City	Birmingham, England
		(Report)	Horlock (pen.)	Stadium: Villa Park; Attendance: 24,138; Referee: D Elleray (Harrow-on-the-Hill)

29 November 2000 4	Manchester City	2–1	Wimbledon	Manchester, Greater Manchester
	Wanchope; Goater	(Report)	Roberts	Stadium: Maine Road; Attendance: 19,513; Referee: W Jordan (Tring)

19 December 2000 5	Manchester City	1–2 (a.e.t.)	Ipswich Town	Manchester, Greater Manchester
	Goater 10'	(Report)	Holland 60'; Venus 109'	Stadium: Maine Road; Attendance: 31,252; Referee: G Poll (Tring)

== First-team squad ==
Squad at end of season

Note: Flags indicate national team as defined under FIFA eligibility rules; some limited exceptions apply. Players may hold more than one non-FIFA nationality.

No.	Pos.	Nation	Player
1	GK	ENG	Nicky Weaver
3	DF	ENG	Richard Edghill
4	MF	NED	Gerard Wiekens
5	DF	SCO	Andy Morrison
6	MF	NIR	Kevin Horlock
7	DF	ENG	Spencer Prior
9	FW	SCO	Paul Dickov
10	FW	BER	Shaun Goater
11	MF	ENG	Terry Cooke
12	MF	RUS	Andrei Kanchelskis (on loan from Rangers)
14	FW	WAL	Gareth Taylor
15	DF	NOR	Alf-Inge Haaland (captain)
16	DF	SCO	Paul Ritchie
17	MF	NIR	Jim Whitley
18	MF	NIR	Jeff Whitley
19	MF	AUS	Danny Tiatto
20	GK	ENG	Carlo Nash
21	FW	ENG	Darren Huckerby

No.	Pos.	Nation	Player
22	DF	IRL	Richard Dunne
23	FW	CRC	Paulo Wanchope
24	DF	ENG	Steve Howey
26	GK	IRL	Richard McKinney
27	FW	NOR	Egil Østenstad (on loan from Blackburn Rovers)
28	MF	ENG	Tony Grant
29	MF	ENG	Shaun Wright-Phillips
30	GK	ENG	Steven Hodgson
31	DF	FRA	Laurent Charvet
32	FW	ENG	Leon Mike
33	FW	NZL	Chris Killen
34	MF	IRL	Mark Kennedy
35	GK	IRL	Brian Murphy
36	DF	ENG	Danny Granville
37	MF	CAN	Terry Dunfield
38	DF	WAL	Rhys Day
39	MF	NGR	Dickson Etuhu
40	MF	ENG	Chris Shuker

=== Left club during season ===
Note: Flags indicate national team as defined under FIFA eligibility rules; some limited exceptions apply. Players may hold more than one non-FIFA nationality.

No.	Pos.	Nation	Player
2	DF	ENG	Lee Crooks (on loan to Northampton Town; to Barnsley)
8	MF	ENG	Ian Bishop (to Miami Fusion)
12	FW	AUS	Daniel Allsopp (to Notts County)
13	GK	NIR	Tommy Wright (to Bolton Wanderers)
20	MF	SCO	Gary Mason (to Dunfermline Athletic)
21	DF	ENG	Nick Fenton (to Notts County)
22	FW	LBR	George Weah (to Marseille)

No.	Pos.	Nation	Player
25	DF	ENG	Richard Jobson (to Tranmere Rovers)
27	DF	IRL	Shaun Holmes (released)
31	MF	ENG	David Laycock (released)
33	FW	NZL	Chris Killen (on loan to Wrexham)
36	DF	ENG	Danny Granville (on loan to Norwich City)
37	FW	ENG	Robert Taylor (to Wolverhampton Wanderers)

=== Reserve squad ===
Note: Flags indicate national team as defined under FIFA eligibility rules; some limited exceptions apply. Players may hold more than one non-FIFA nationality.

No.	Pos.	Nation	Player
-	DF	ENG	Stephen Jordan
-	DF	IRL	Paddy McCarthy
-	DF	ENG	Tyrone Mears
-	MF	GER	Dino Toppmöller

No.	Pos.	Nation	Player
-	MF	IRL	Glenn Whelan
-	DF	ENG	Darren (Dazzler) Garfield
-	MF	ENG	Andrew Tunnicliffe

== Statistics ==
=== Appearances and goals ===
No.	Pos	Nat	Player	Total		Premier League		FA Cup		League Cup	
No.	Pos	Nat	Player	Apps	Goals	Apps	Goals	Apps	Goals	Apps	Goals
Goalkeepers
1	GK	(England) ENG	Nicky Weaver	39	0	31	0	3	0	5	0
20	GK	(England) ENG	Carlo Nash	6	0	6	0	0	0	0	0
Defenders
3	DF	(England) ENG	Richard Edghill	7	0	6	0	1	0	0	0
4	DF	(Netherlands) NED	Gerard Wiekens	41	2	29+5	2	2+1	0	3+1	0
5	DF	(Scotland) SCO	Andy Morrison	7	1	3	0	3	1	1	0
7	DF	(England) ENG	Spencer Prior	28	1	18+3	1	2+1	0	4	0
15	DF	(Norway) NOR	Alf-Inge Haaland	43	3	35	3	3	0	5	0
16	DF	(Scotland) SCO	Paul Ritchie	16	0	11+1	0	1	0	3	0
22	DF	(Republic of Ireland) IRL	Richard Dunne	28	0	24+1	0	3	0	0	0
24	DF	(England) ENG	Steve Howey	39	6	36	6	1	0	2	0
31	DF	(France) FRA	Laurent Charvet	21	0	16+4	0	0+1	0	0	0
36	DF	(England) ENG	Danny Granville	25	0	16+3	0	3	0	0+3	0
Midfielders
6	MF	(Northern Ireland) NIR	Kevin Horlock	18	3	14	2	0	0	4	1
12	MF	(Russia) RUS	Andrei Kanchelskis	11	1	7+3	0	1	1	0	0
18	MF	(Northern Ireland) NIR	Jeff Whitley	37	1	28+3	1	1	0	5	0
19	MF	(Australia) AUS	Danny Tiatto	39	2	31+2	2	2	0	4	0
28	MF	(England) ENG	Tony Grant	12	0	5+5	0	1+1	0	0	0
29	MF	(England) ENG	Shaun Wright-Phillips	19	0	9+6	0	0	0	3+1	0
34	MF	(Republic of Ireland) IRL	Mark Kennedy	30	1	15+10	0	0	0	1+4	1
37	MF	(Canada) CAN	Terry Dunfield	1	0	0+1	0	0	0	0	0
Forwards
9	FW	(Scotland) SCO	Paul Dickov	25	5	15+6	4	0+1	0	2+1	1
10	FW	(Bermuda) BER	Shaun Goater	32	11	20+6	6	2+1	3	3	2
21	FW	(England) ENG	Darren Huckerby	16	2	8+5	1	3	1	0	0
23	FW	(Costa Rica) CRC	Paulo Wanchope	31	10	25+2	9	1	0	3	1
27	FW	(Norway) NOR	Egil Østenstad	4	0	1+3	0	0	0	0	0
Players transferred out during the season
2	DF	(England) ENG	Lee Crooks	4	0	0+2	0	0	0	2	0
8	MF	(England) ENG	Ian Bishop	16	0	3+7	0	0+1	0	2+3	0
12	FW	(Australia) AUS	Danny Allsopp	1	0	0+1	0	0	0	0	0
13	GK	(Northern Ireland) NIR	Tommy Wright	1	0	1	0	0	0	0	0
22	FW	(Liberia) LBR	George Weah	9	4	5+2	1	0	0	2	3
25	DF	(England) ENG	Richard Jobson	2	0	0	0	0	0	1+1	0

Last updated: 19 May 2001
Source: Competitions

=== Starting 11 ===
Considering starts in all competitions

No.	Pos.	Nat.	Name	MS	Notes
1	GK	(England)	Nicky Weaver	39	
37	RB	(France)	Laurent Charvet	16	
24	CB	(England)	Steve Howey	39	
22	CB	(Republic of Ireland)	Richard Dunne	27	
36	LB	(England)	Danny Granville	19	
19	RM	(Australia)	Danny Tiatto	37	
4	CM	(Netherlands)	Gerard Wiekens	34	
15	CM	(Norway)	Alf-Inge Haaland	43	
18	LM	(Northern Ireland)	Jeff Whitley	34	
10	CF	(Bermuda)	Shaun Goater	25	
23	CF	(Costa Rica)	Paulo Wanchope	25	

== Transfers ==
=== In ===
- (Norway) Alf-Inge Haaland – (England) Leeds United, 12 June, £2,500,000
- (Liberia) George Weah – (Italy) Milan, 1 August, free
- (Costa Rica) Paulo Wanchope – (England) West Ham United, 8 August, £3,650,000
- (England) Steve Howey – (England) Newcastle United, 11 August, £2,000,000 (rising to £3,000,000 depending on appearances)
- (Scotland) Paul Ritchie – (Scotland) Rangers, 21 August, £500,000
- (Republic of Ireland) Richard Dunne – (England) Everton, 16 October, £3,000,000
- (France) Laurent Charvet – (England) Newcastle United, 25 October, £1,000,000 (rising to £1,500,000 depending on appearances)
- (England) Darren Huckerby – (England) Leeds United, 29 December, £2,500,000
- (England) Carlo Nash – (England) Stockport County, 11 January, £100,000
- (Russia) Andrei Kanchelskis – (Scotland) Rangers, 25 January, three-month loan
- (Norway) Egil Østenstad – (England) Blackburn Rovers, 5 February, two-month loan

=== Out ===
- (England) Craig Russell – (Scotland) St Johnstone, 11 July, free
- (England) Lee Peacock – (England) Bristol City, 9 August, £600,000
- (England) Jamie Pollock – (England) Crystal Palace, 11 August, £75,000
- (England) Robert Taylor – (England) Wolverhampton Wanderers, 15 August, £1,550,000
- (Liberia) George Weah – released, 16 October (later joined (France) Marseille on 18 October)
- (England) Nick Fenton – (England) Notts County, 9 November, £150,000
- (Scotland) Gary Mason – (Scotland) Dunfermline Athletic, 15 December, free
- (England) Ian Bishop – (United States) Miami Fusion, 28 February, undisclosed
- (England) Lee Crooks – (England) Barnsley, 2 March, undisclosed
- (Northern Ireland) Tommy Wright – (England) Bolton Wanderers, 22 March, free
- (Wales) Gareth Taylor – (England) Burnley, 22 March, loan
- (England) Chris Shuker – (England) Macclesfield Town, 22 March, loan
- (Scotland) Andy Morrison – (England) Sheffield United, 22 March, loan
- (England) Lee Crooks – (England) Northampton Town, December, loan
- (Australia) Daniel Allsopp – (England) Notts County, December, £300,000
- (England) Richard Jobson – (England) Tranmere Rovers
- (Republic of Ireland) Shaun Holmes – released
- (England) David Laycock – released
- (New Zealand) Chris Killen – (Wales) Wrexham, loan
- (England) Danny Granville – (England) Norwich City, October, loan
- (England) Terry Cooke – (England) Sheffield Wednesday, loan
