= Steve Howey =

Steve Howey may refer to:

- Steve Howey (actor) (born 1977), American actor
- Steve Howey (footballer) (born 1971), English footballer
