= Andy Morrison =

Scottish footballer and manager

Personal information
- Full name: Andrew Charles Morrison
- Date of birth: 30 July 1970 (age 56)
- Place of birth: Inverness, Scotland
- Height: 5 ft 11 in (1.80 m)
- Position: Central defender

Senior career*
Years	Team	Apps	(Gls)
1987–1993	Plymouth Argyle	113	(6)
1993–1994	Blackburn Rovers	5	(0)
1994–1996	Blackpool	47	(3)
1996–1998	Huddersfield Town	45	(2)
1998–2002	Manchester City	48	(5)
2000	→ Blackpool (loan)	6	(1)
2000	→ Crystal Palace (loan)	5	(0)
2001	→ Sheffield United (loan)	4	(0)
Total		262	(16)

Managerial career
- 2015–2021: Connah's Quay Nomads
- 2022–2024: Sri Lanka
- * Club domestic league appearances and goals

Andrew Charles Morrison (born 30 July 1970) is a Scottish football manager and former footballer who last served as the head coach of the Sri Lanka national team.

As a player he was a central defender who played in the Premier League with Blackburn Rovers and Manchester City. Although only playing 38 League games over four seasons for City he captained the club in the 1999 Football League Second Division play-off final victory over Gillingham and would play for the club in three different divisions. He also played in the Football League for Plymouth Argyle, Blackpool, Crystal Palace, and Sheffield United.

Following retirement, Morrison became assistant manager of Bury, later having a similar role at Northwich Victoria and Airbus UK Broughton. He later had a spell as director of football of Connah's Quay Nomads before going on to manage the club for six years. He has also mixed his coaching roles with being the fan ambassador for Manchester City.

== Playing career ==
=== Early career ===
Born in Inverness though a native of Kinlochbervie, Morrison moved to Plymouth at the age of eight. At the age of 13, Morrison had a trial at Southampton along with 39 other hopefuls including Alan Shearer, Tim Flowers and Matt Le Tissier. Morrison began his career at Plymouth Argyle. He made his Football League debut as a substitute in a 5–2 defeat at Aston Villa, in 1987, in which David Platt scored the winning goal. Morrison did not establish himself in the Argyle first team until the 1989–90 season. An uncompromising centre-half with a broad Plymothian accent, Morrison scored his first senior goal in a 1–0 win at home to Ipswich Town in March 1990.

Morrison was a regular fixture in the Plymouth side under manager Dave Kemp, but the arrival of Peter Shilton as player-manager in February 1991 marked the beginning of the end of his time at Plymouth. Morrison took exception to Shilton's managerial style, while Shilton, for his part, was keen to cash in on one of his most saleable assets to bring in signings of his own. Morrison spent one final season at Home Park following the club's relegation from the second tier in 1992, before Shilton accepted a £500,000 offer from Blackburn Rovers, then managed by Kenny Dalglish.

=== Blackburn Rovers ===
Morrison made 5 appearances for Blackburn Rovers in the 1993–94 season, in which the club finished second in the premier league. He made his Premier League debut for the club when he replaced Tim Sherwood in a 3–0 victory over Wimbledon F.C. in February 1994. Morrison started, and almost scored, in a 1–0 defeat to Charlton Athletic in the FA Cup. He subsequently replaced Kevin Moran in a 1–0 defeat to Arsenal (in which Paul Merson scored the winner) and David Batty in a 3–1 defeat to Southampton (in which Stuart Ripley scored Blackburn's goal). Morrison started for Blackburn in a 2–1 victory against West Ham United (in which Henning Berg and Ian Pearce scored Blackburn's goals) in April 1994. His last game for Blackburn was a 2–1 defeat to Coventry City, in May 1994, which ended Blackburn's title hopes that season. Morrison was given a 'torrid time' by Peter Ndlovu in the game and later claimed that Ndlovu had ruined his career with Blackburn. Morrison also played for Blackburn's reserve team, alongside Shay Given and former Plymouth teammate Nicky Marker. Morrison played in the reserve team defeat against Manchester United's reserve team, which featured Bryan Robson and Dion Dublin, in which Marker's tackle on Ben Thornley led to the latter being sidelined for over a year and ultimately to legal action. Morrison was unable to break into the Rovers side on a regular basis, as he faced competition from Colin Hendry, Henning Berg and Ian Pearce. Morrison began the 1994–95 season as a member of the Blackburn squad that went on to win the Premier League that season. He was an unused substitute in the 1994 FA Charity Shield in which Blackburn were beaten 2–0 by Manchester United after goals from Eric Cantona and Paul Ince. In December 1994 Morrison was bought by Sam Allardyce for Blackpool. The transfer fee was £245,000, which was then a Blackpool club-record. Celtic F.C. were also interested in Morrison, but ended up signing John Hughes from Falkirk F.C.

=== Blackpool ===
Allardyce described Morrison as a "horrible in-your-face" centre-back and a "complete nutter". Morrison made his debut for the Tangerines on 10 December, in a 3–1 victory over AFC Bournemouth. He was suspended for the next two games, however, after picking up a booking during the match and, thus, hitting the relevant number of disciplinary points. Morrison spent two years at Blackpool and was made club captain by Allardyce In a match against Plymouth Argyle, in January of the 1994–95, Morrison was moved from defence into midfield, at half time (at which time Blackpool were losing 2–0), which proved to be the catalyst for a 5–2 victory. In the 1995–96 season Blackpool finished in the playoff places. Blackpool won the first leg of their play-off game against Bradford City (who were managed by Chris Kamara) 2–0. Kamara changed his tactics in the second leg, to dissipate Morrison's influence in the game, and Blackpool were defeated 3–0. Bradford went on to beat Notts County in the final to earn promotion. Blackpool's defeat led to Allardyce's departure. Morrison also moved on from Blackpool.

=== Huddersfield Town ===
Morrison was signed by Brian Horton for Huddersfield Town in the 1996–97 season. Horton used the £2.7 million that Sheffield Wednesday had used to purchase Andy Booth from Huddersfield, to invest in Morrison as well as Marcus Stewart from Bristol Rovers and Andy Payton from Barnsley. Horton, like Allardyce before him, also made Morrison captain. Morrison scored in his debut for Huddersfield against Charlton (which Huddersfield won 2–0). Morrison's Huddersfield teammate Ben Thornley described him as 'the hardest person to have ever played football'. Morrison won the respect of fans 'with his braveheart style warrior performances'. A knee injury restricted Morrison's appearances for Huddersfield in the 1996–97 season. He was replaced by Sam Collins in a 1–0 defeat to Tranmere Rovers in September 1996 and did not play for Huddersfield again until a 0–0 draw with Manchester City in November 1996, in which he was replaced by Kevin Gray just after half time. He did not play again until April 1997 when he replaced David Beresford, at half time, in a 2–1 defeat to Charlton Athletic. In the 1997–98 season, Morrison played in Huddersfield's 3–0 defeat to West Ham United in the League Cup, in which John Hartson scored a hat trick. He also played in Huddersfield's 1–0 defeat to Wimbledon, in the FA Cup, in which Neal Ardley scored the only goal. Huddersfield's poor results in the league that season (they went nine games without a win) led to Horton being sacked. Horton was replaced by Peter Jackson, who managed to keep the team up. Morrison played in Huddersfield's first victory that season, a 3–1 win against Stoke City (in which Lee Richardson, Stewart and Paul Dalton scored Huddersfield's goals). He also played in Huddersfield's second win of the season, a 1–0 victory against Manchester City at Maine Road, in which Rob Edwards scored the winner. In the 1998–99 season, Morrison played in Huddersfield's 2–1 defeat to Everton, in the League Cup, in which Olivier Dacourt and Marco Materazzi scored Everton's goals and Stewart scored Huddersfield's goal. Morrison fell out with Jackson early that season when the latter decided to make Barry Horne Huddersfield captain, leading to Morrison's departure.

=== Manchester City ===
Morrison was signed by Joe Royle for Manchester City, in the 1998–99 season, following their relegation to Division Two. The transfer fee was £80,000. Morrison made his debut in a 2–1 victory against Colchester United in October 1998. Morrison headed in City's second goal of the game and received a man of the match award, which was presented to him by former City winger Dennis Tueart. Morrison also scored in his second game for City, a 3–0 victory against Oldham Athletic. Morrison endeared himself to the City fans and was soon made captain. He scored his third goal for City in a 1–1 draw with Luton Town. One fanzine asked: "Where can we get another half-dozen Andy Morrisons?" According to goalkeeper Nicky Weaver: "Morrison was a huge signing for us. Joe made him captain straight away. He was an intimidating figure for the opposition and he could be intimidating as a team-mate as well. I'd stand behind him in the tunnel and he'd be beating his chest, ready for battle. The other team would be thinking, 'I don't fancy tangling with him today'. But to be fair to Andy, he wasn't just a brute and growling pitbull. He had a great touch, too." In an 1–0 defeat to Wimbledon, in the FA Cup, Morrison was sent off after a scuffle with Carl Cort. Morrison scored his fourth goal of the season, via a thundering header from a corner, in a 6–0 victory against Burnley (Shaun Goater scored a hat trick and Kevin Horlock and Danny Allsopp scored the other goals). City finished in the play-off places in the league. Morrison captained City to victory over Gillingham in the 1999 Football League Second Division play-off final at Wembley in May 1999. In the match Morrison's teammates Kevin Horlock and Paul Dickov scored late goals to take the match to extra time and penalties (which City won). Morrison was presented with the playoff trophy at the end of the game and became the fifth City captain (following Sam Cowan, Roy Paul, Tony Book and Mike Doyle) to lift a trophy at Wembley. He has been succeeded, in this respect, by Carlos Tevez (who captained City to victory in the 2011 FA Cup Final) and Vincent Kompany (who has won the EFL Cup four times with City), although they captained City to victories at the new Wembley Stadium.

In City's first game in Division One, they lost 1–0 to Wolverhampton Wanderers. Robbie Keane scored the only goal of the game. In City's second game in Division One, Morrison was famously sent off for sticking out his tongue at Stan Collymore in a 0–0 draw with Fulham. Morrison remonstrated angrily before leaving the pitch, pushing Collymore in the face as he left. Collymore mentioned the incident in his autobiography, stating that Morrison 'stuck his tongue in my mouth' and that he was one of three players (along with Andy Todd and Darren Purse) who sought to 'prove that they were real hard men when they were up against me'. City's first victory of the season came in 6–0 defeat of Sheffield United. Morrison's performances endeared him to then Scotland manager Craig Brown. Brown was reportedly interested in calling Morrison up to the international team to play in the UEFA Euro 2000 qualifying play-offs against England. However, twelve games into the season, Morrison picked up an injury, in a 2–1 victory against Port Vale. As a result, Morrison was not available to be picked by Brown for Scotland and he missed the rest of the 1999–2000 season. The season ended with City being promoted to the Premier League (a rare second successive promotion). Morrison spent 14 months attempting to return to the Manchester City team, even requesting that Royle loan him out to his former club Blackpool who were managed by Steve McMahon at the time. Morrison played 6 times and scored once (in a game against Hartlepool United) for Blackpool. In one of his appearances for Blackpool, they beat Kidderminster Harriers 4–1 with both Brett Ormerod and Paul Simpson scoring braces. Morrison then joined Crystal Palace (then managed by Alan Smith), on a months loan in October 2000, to continue improving his match fitness. Palace signed Morrison, on loan, as a replacement for Andy Linighan, who was sacked following a dispute with Palace Chairman Simon Jordan. At Crystal Palace, Morrison played alongside both Neil Ruddock and Steve Staunton in defence. Morrison made his debut for Palace in a 2–1 defeat to Birmingham City. In Morrison's second game for Palace, despite defending 'in a ruggedly efficient manner', they lost 3–1 to Fulham (with Louis Saha scoring once and Lee Clark scoring a brace for Fulham). Morrison subsequently played in a 3–2 defeat to Portsmouth and a 1–0 defeat to Grimsby Town After the defeat to Grimsby, Morrison farted during a team talk by Smith, enraging Simon Jordan. Morrison's final game for Palace was a 3–3 draw with Bolton Wanderers, in which Dougie Freedman and Clinton Morrison scored late goals to earn a point. Morrison returned to City at the end of his loan spell.

Morrison's absence had prompted Royle to sign Spencer Prior to help City earn promotion, and subsequently Steve Howey and Richard Dunne to help the team stay in the top flight. Morrison returned to the City team in a League Cup game against Ipswich in December 2000. However, due to the number of yellow cards he had picked up in reserve-team games he could not play Premier League football until New Year's Day 2001, when he played in a 1–1 draw with Coventry City. In his next outing, an FA Cup game against Birmingham City, he scored with a bullet header in a 3–2 victory (Darren Huckerby and Shaun Goater scored the other goals for City). Morrison made two further appearances for City in the league: a 4–0 defeat to Leeds United and a 1–1 draw with Liverpool. In the latter, Morrison was replaced, by Andrei Kanchelskis (on loan from Rangers), at half time, due to a hamstring injury. Morrison was forced to withdraw from the squad, which drew 1–1 with Middlesbrough in early February, due to the same hamstring injury (he was replaced, in the squad, by Shaun Wright-Phillips). Morrison played in City's 1–0 victory against Coventry City in the fourth round of the FA Cup (in which Goater scored the only goal). Morrison also played in the fifth round of the FA Cup, against eventual winners Liverpool (which ended in a 4–2 defeat). Morrison was spoken to by a police officer for squirting water at a Liverpool fan after he had been replaced by Tony Grant. After the game, Royle dismissed speculation that Morrison had played his last game for the club. However, the defeat did prove to be Morrison's last appearance for City, as Royle became concerned about his injury record. Morrison was subsequently loaned out to Sheffield United, who were then managed by Neil Warnock. Morrison played alongside another former Manchester City captain, Keith Curle, in defence at Sheffield United. The wisdom of allowing Morrison to be loaned out was questioned when Howey suffered an injury whilst playing for City. Morrison made his debut for Sheffield United in a 4–1 defeat to Gillingham. He came on as a substitute, replacing Gus Uhlenbeek, in a 1–0 defeat to Wimbledon in United's next game, in which he almost scored a late equaliser. In Morrison's third game for Sheffield United they beat Grimsby Town 1–0, with Peter Ndlovu scoring the only goal. In Morrison's final game for Sheffield United, a 2–0 victory against Burnley, Morrison picked up the injury that ended his career. City were subsequently relegated to Division One once more. Shaun Goater contended that City 'missed Andy Morrison's presence that season' and that 'with his motivational skills things might have turned out differently'.

Royle was sacked following City's relegation and Kevin Keegan became manager at Maine Road. It was speculated that Morrison's time at the club was over. Morrison was linked with moves to Burnley, Stoke City and Bristol City. Nevertheless, Keegan praised the Scot for his hard work in training, and with City's defence leaking goals (they conceded 52 goals in the 2001–02 season), fans hoped Morrison would be given his chance. Keegan hoped that Morrison could provide leadership in the dressing room to address the drinking culture at the club, but lamented that he 'couldn't get him in the team' (due to his continuing injury woes), which led to the signing of Stuart Pearce. Morrison ultimately failed to recover from the injury that he sustained while he was at Sheffield United and he was released by the club at the end of the season. This was not before he was given his chance to say farewell to the Manchester City fans in a match against Crystal Palace. Keegan said of Morrison: "Andy received cult status when the club gained promotion. He is a first-class professional and deserves a chance to further his career." City went on to win the 2001–02 Football League First Division, thereby earning promotion to the Premier League.

=== Later career ===
In late 2002, Morrison was given a trial at Bury. He played 45 minutes for Bury's reserve team, but his injury prevented him taking any further part.

== Playing legacy ==
Morrison is remembered by Manchester City fans as one of their best-ever captains, and was voted so in the club's official magazine. Only Roy Paul and Tony Book were deemed to be better captains than him. The magazine also listed Morrison second in a list of hard men, behind Mike Doyle but above the likes of Stuart Pearce and Gerry Gow. Some feel that it was Morrison's leadership skills and ability to get the players around him to raise their game that enabled Manchester City to return to the Premier League after their fall into Division Two. In an interview with the BBC on 23 September 2005, Joe Royle spoke of his sympathy for Nottingham Forest, a club which, like Manchester City, had fallen two divisions. He said, "Big clubs in that division are a scalp and everyone wants to beat them. We had that at City and it was hard for us, but we got the hang of it. The catalyst for us was signing Andy Morrison. He was the man for the job and the man for the division. He dragged us up kicking and screaming. He is the kind of player that Forest need – if they can find somebody like him. We only got him because of his injury record, and because he had had a major fall-out with the manager at Huddersfield. He was as strong as they come and feared nobody – he played a big part in turning things round for us."

== Coaching career ==
After Morrison's departure from Bury, he decided to retire from the playing side of the game. He became assistant manager to Andy Preece at Worcester City.

During a pre-season friendly match against Kidderminster Harriers on 5 August 2006, an incident in the changing-room area caused the game to be abandoned after 71 minutes. Harriers' manager Mark Yates called the referee over to him and said he was going to take his team off due to an off-the-field incident involving Morrison. On 17 August, Worcester City announced the results of an internal enquiry into the incident. The club fined Morrison the maximum allowed under FA guidelines, suspended him for three games, and warned him of his future conduct. The Football Association itself fined Morrison £750 and also gave him a six-match touchline ban.

Morrison resigned in April 2007.

In September 2010 it was announced that he had been appointed as manager of the Seychelles national football team. In fact, they had appointed Andrew Amers-Morrison who was visiting the country on holiday and whom the Seychellois football officials mistakenly believed was Andy Morrison. Suketu Patel, chairman of the Seychelles Football Federation (SFF) conceded that "we thought we were getting the real Andy Morrison". Initially the SFF offered Amers-Morrison a two-year contract, but they reduced it to six months when they realised their error. The SFF sacked Amers-Morrison two weeks later because they "could no longer be certain if he was still the right person to head the coaching staff of the national team".

Morrison continued to be part of Andy Preece's management team, working with him at Northwich Victoria. He resigned from the club on 16 January 2012 along with the rest of the first team management, with the club reporting that Preece was expected to be appointed Director of Football at Welsh Premier League side Airbus UK Broughton the next day. The next day he was appointed as Assistant Manager at Airbus UK. Morrison left his role at Airbus in July 2015.

On 2 November 2015 Morrison was appointed Director of Football at Welsh Premier League club Connah's Quay. Morrison led The Nomads to their highest ever finish in his first season in charge, leading the side to a fourth-placed finish in the Welsh Premier League, and winning the play-off final against Airbus UK Broughton, leading to the club's first ever venture into the UEFA Europa League. In 2016, Morrison won the 20th edition of the Footballers' Golf Classic at the world-famous La Manga Club in Spain, defeating his former boss Kenny Dalglish in the process.

Connah's Quay won its first Welsh Cup with a 4–1 victory over Aberystwyth Town on 6 May 2018.

The Nomads were the first non-Scottish side to reach the Scottish Challenge Cup Final, but lost to 3–1 Ross County on 23 March 2019. The final was held at the Caledonian Stadium in Inverness, the city of Morrison's birth.

On 28 September 2021, Connah's Quay Nomads announced that Morrison had resigned from his position as manager.

On 11 May 2022, he was appointed as the new head coach of the Sri Lanka national football team.

== Personal life ==
In August 2006, Morrison pleaded guilty to four charges of fraud concerning income support, jobseeker's allowance, and council tax benefits, dating from August 2003 to July 2005. He failed to inform the Department for Work and Pensions and Vale Royal Borough Council in Cheshire that he had £58,000 in his bank account while he was still claiming benefits. He defrauded the authorities out of more than £6,500 and was ordered to pay £95 court costs and carry out a fifty-hour community punishment order. In mitigation it was said that he "was dissipating the capital very quickly, spending his own money on operations. He blames no-one apart from himself. He is not financially astute at all. He is very naive when it comes to finance. He has little or no knowledge of the financial world".

Morrison was inducted into the Hall of Fame at Bloomfield Road when it was officially opened by former Blackpool player Jimmy Armfield in April 2006. Organised by the Blackpool Supporters Association, Blackpool fans around the world voted on their all-time heroes. Five players from each decade are inducted; Morrison is in the 1990s.

In 2013, Morrison returned to Manchester City as the club's fan ambassador.

On March 5th, 2026, Morrison announced via a video shared on his X account that he had been diagnosed with Ramsay Hunt Syndrome.

== Career statistics ==
=== Club ===
Appearances and goals by club, season and competition
Club	Season	League			FA Cup		League Cup		Europe		Other		Total	
Club	Season	Division	Apps	Goals	Apps	Goals	Apps	Goals	Apps	Goals	Apps	Goals	Apps	Goals
Plymouth Argyle	1987–88	Second Division	1	0	0	0	0	0	–		–		1	0
Plymouth Argyle	1988–89	Second Division	2	0	0	0	0	0	–		–		2	0
Plymouth Argyle	1989–90	Second Division	19	1	0	0	0	0	–		–		19	1
Plymouth Argyle	1990–91	Second Division	32	2	0	0	0	0	–		0	0	32	2
Plymouth Argyle	1991–92	Second Division	30	3	0	0	0	0	–		0	0	30	3
Plymouth Argyle	1992–93	Second Division	29	0	0	0	0	0	–		0	0	29	0
Plymouth Argyle	Total		113	6	6	0	10	1	0	0	0	0	129	7
Blackburn Rovers	1993–94	Premier League	5	0	1	0	0	0	–		–		6	0
Blackburn Rovers	1994–95	Premier League	0	0	0	0	0	0	–		–		0	0
Blackburn Rovers	Total		5	0	1	0	0	0	0	0	0	0	6	0
Blackpool	1994–95	Division 2	18	0	1	0	0	0	0	0	–		18	0
Blackpool	1995–96	Division 2	29	3	1	0	0	0	0	0	4	0	29	3
Blackpool	Total		47	3	2	0	0	0	0	0	4	0	53	3
Huddersfield Town	1996–97	Division 1	10	1	0	0	2	0	0	0	0	0	10	1
Huddersfield Town	1997–98	Division 1	23	1	2	0	3	0	–		–		23	1
Huddersfield Town	1998–99	Division 1	12	0	0	0	3	0	0	0	–		12	0
Huddersfield Town	Total		45	2	2	0	8	0	0	0	0	0	55	2
Manchester City	1998–1999	Division 2	22	4	4	0	0	0	0	0	–		22	4
Manchester City	1999–2000	Division 1	12	0	0	0	2	0	–		–		12	0
Manchester City	2000–01	Premier League	3	0	3	1	1	0	–		–		7	1
Manchester City	2001–02	Division 1	0	0	0	0	0	0	0	0	–		0	0
Manchester City	Total		27	4	7	1	3	0	0	0	1	0	37	5
Blackpool (loan)	2000–01	Division 3	6	1	0	0	0	0	0	0	–		6	1
Crystal Palace (loan)	2000–01	Division 1	5	0	0	0	0	0	0	0	–		5	0
Sheffield United (loan)	2000–01	Division 1	4	0	0	0	0	0	0	0	–		4	0
Career total			262	16	17	1	21	1	0	0	6	0	306	18

== Honours ==
=== As a Player ===
Manchester City

- Football League First Division runner-up: 1999–2000
- Football League Second Division play-offs: 1999

=== As a Manager ===
Connah's Quay Nomads

- Cymru Premier: 2019–20, 2020–21
- Welsh Cup: 2017–18
- Welsh League Cup: 2019–20

Individual

- Cymru Premier Manager of the Year: 2019–20
