= 2001–02 Manchester City F.C. season =

English football club season

Manchester City
2001–02 season
- Owner: Publicly traded company
- Chairman: David Bernstein
- Manager: Kevin Keegan
- First Division: 1st (promoted)
- FA Cup: Fifth round
- League Cup: Fourth round
- Top goalscorer: League: Shaun Goater (28 goals); All: Shaun Goater (32 goals)
- Highest home attendance: Home: 34,657 v Portsmouth 21 April 2002; Away: 51,069 v Newcastle United 17 February 2002
- Lowest home attendance: Home: 13,912 v Birmingham City 10 October 2001; Away: 5,972 v Notts County 11 September 2001
Home colours	Away colours	Third colours

Results summary - all competitions
	Wins	Draws	Losses	Win %
Home	21	3	1	84.0%
Away	14	3	10	51.9%
Both	35	6	11	67.3%

Results summary - First Division
	Wins	Draws	Losses	Win %
Home	19	3	1	82.6%
Away	12	3	8	52.2%
Both	31	6	9	67.4%

The 2001–02 season was Manchester City Football Club's 110th season playing in a division of English football, most of which have been spent in the top flight. This season was the club's most recent season of second-tier league football, with the team playing in the Football League First Division following its immediate relegation from the Premier League in the previous season after its promotion the season before that. This time around the team was promoted at the first time of asking, with it winning the First Division by a clear 10 points while scoring more than 100 league goals for the first time since the 1957–58 season.

== Season review ==
The team's performance in the First Division this season matched a number of prior club records whilst also setting some new ones. The team equaled the record number of total goals scored (108) in any prior season; set a new club high for total league points accumulated (99) in a single season (since 3 points for a win was introduced into English football); produced the highest number of seasonal wins (31); and equaled the club's prior record for the total number of home wins (19). Additionally, Manchester City's First Division championship title became a record seventh English second-tier title won by the club, a record until Leicester City won their eighth in 2024. Shaun Goater, the club's leading goal scorer this campaign with a tally of 32 goals - making him the first City player since Francis Lee in 1972 to net more than 30 goals in a season - scored 28 of those in the club's pursuit of promotion back to the top flight, which meant that he was also the leading goal scorer in the First Division this season.

== Team kit ==
The team kit was produced by Le Coq Sportif and the shirt sponsor was Eidos Interactive.

Home	Away	Third

== Historical league performance ==
Prior to this season, the history of Manchester City's performance in the English football league hierarchy since the creation of the Premier League in 1992 is summarised by the following timeline chart – which commences with the last season (1991–92) of the old Football League First Division (from which the Premier League was formed).

== Games ==
=== Football League First Division ===
==== Position in final standings ====
Pos	Team	Pld	W	D	L	GF	GA	GD	Pts	Qualification or relegation
1	Manchester City (C, P)	46	31	6	9	108	52	+56	99	Promotion to the Premier League
2	West Bromwich Albion (P)	46	27	8	11	61	29	+32	89	Promotion to the Premier League
3	Wolverhampton Wanderers	46	25	11	10	76	43	+33	86	Qualification for the First Division play-offs
4	Millwall	46	22	11	13	69	48	+21	77	Qualification for the First Division play-offs
5	Birmingham City (O, P)	46	21	13	12	70	49	+21	76	Qualification for the First Division play-offs

Rules for classification: 1) Points; 2) Goal difference; 3) Goals scored
(C) Champions; (O) Play-off winners; (P) Promoted

==== Results summary ====
Overall								Home						Away					
Pld	W	D	L	GF	GA	GD	Pts	W	D	L	GF	GA	GD	W	D	L	GF	GA	GD
46	31	6	9	108	52	+56	99	19	3	1	63	19	+44	12	3	8	45	33	+12

Last updated: 21 April 2002 (end of season).
Source: Football League First Division 2001–02

==== Points breakdown ====
Points at home: 60
Points away from home: 39

6 points: Barnsley, Birmingham City, Bradford City, Burnley, Crewe Alexandra,

Gillingham, Grimsby Town, Millwall, Sheffield Wednesday, Watford,
Wolverhampton Wanderers

4 points: Nottingham Forest, Rotherham United, Sheffield United, Walsall
3 points: Coventry City, Crystal Palace, Norwich City, Portsmouth, Preston N. End
1 point: Stockport County, West Bromwich Albion
0 points: Wimbledon

==== Biggest & smallest ====
Biggest home wins: 5–1 vs. Burnley, 29 December 2001 & vs. Barnsley, 6 April 2002
4–0 vs. Grimsby Town, 23 October 2001 & vs. Sheffield Wednesday, 27 Feb. 2002
Biggest home defeat: 0–4 vs. Wimbledon, 1 October 2001
Biggest away win: 2–6 vs. Sheffield Wednesday, 22 September 2001
Biggest away defeat: 4–0 vs. West Bromwich Albion, 8 September 2001

Biggest home attendance: 34,657 vs. Portsmouth, 21 April 2002
Smallest home attendance: 30,238 vs. Millwall, 30 January 2002
Biggest away attendance: 28,266 vs. Nottingham Forest, 28 October 2001
Smallest away attendance: 7,618 vs. Walsall, 23 February 2002

==== Results by round ====
Round	1	2	3	4	5	6	7	8	9	10	11	12	13	14	15	16	17	18	19	20	21	22	23	24	25	26	27	28	29	30	31	32	33	34	35	36	37	38	39	40	41	42	43	44	45	46
Ground	H	A	H	A	A	H	A	A	H	H	H	H	A	H	A	A	H	A	H	A	A	A	H	H	H	H	A	H	A	H	A	H	A	H	H	A	A	A	H	A	A	H	A	H	A	H
Result	W	L	W	W	L	W	L	W	W	L	D	D	L	W	D	W	W	L	W	W	W	L	W	W	D	W	W	W	W	W	L	W	D	W	W	W	W	W	W	L	D	W	W	W	W	W

Updated to match(es) played on 21 April 2002 (end of season). Source: 2001–02 Football League First Division
A = Away; H = Home; W = Win; D = Draw; L = Loss

==== Individual match reports ====
11 August 2001	Manchester City	3 – 0	Watford	Manchester, England
15:00	Goater 59'; Berkovic 64'; Pearce 87'	(Report)	Robinson (yellow card) 72' (yellow-red card)	Stadium: Maine Road; Attendance: 33,939; Referee: Mike Riley

18 August 2001	Norwich City	2 – 0	Manchester City	Norwich
15:00	Libbra 75'; McVeigh	(Report)	Wanchope (yellow card) 90' (yellow-red card)	Stadium: Carrow Road; Attendance: 18,745; Referee: Paul Taylor

25 August 2001	Manchester City	5 – 2	Crewe Alexandra	Manchester
17:15	Wanchope 33', 90'; Pearce (pen.), 41'; Goater 80', 89'	(Report)	Hulse 44'; Little 45'	Stadium: Maine Road; Attendance: 32,844; Referee: Howard Webb

27 August 2001	Burnley	2 – 4	Manchester City	Burnley
18:15	Davis 25'; Armstrong (red card) 36'; Briscoe 52'	(Report)	Goater 17', 62', 86'; Wanchope 50'	Stadium: Turf Moor; Attendance: 19,602; Referee: Clive Wilkes

8 September 2001	West Bromwich Albion	4 – 0	Manchester City	West Bromwich
15:00	McInnes 10'; Clement (pen.), 66', 79'; Dobie 83'	(Report)		Stadium: The Hawthorns; Attendance: 23,524; Referee: Graham Frankland

15 September 2001	Manchester City	3 – 0	Birmingham City	Manchester
12:30	Goater 23', 42'; Dunne 25'	(Report)		Stadium: Maine Road; Attendance: 31,714; Referee: Jeff Winter

19 September 2001	Coventry City	4 – 3	Manchester City	Coventry
19:45	Pearce , 15' (o.g.); Konjic 45'; Hughes 65'; Thompson 89'	(Report)	Benarbia 29'; Horlock 57'; Hall , 72' (o.g.)	Stadium: Highfield Road; Attendance: 18,804; Referee: Roger Furnandiz

22 September 2001	Sheffield Wednesday	2 – 6	Manchester City	Sheffield
15:00	Bonvin 3'; Bromby 47'	(Report)	Benarbia 32'; Goater 35', 70'; Granville 59'; Wanchope 68', (pen.), 79'	Stadium: Hillsborough; Attendance: 25,731; Referee: Roy Pearson

25 September 2001	Manchester City	3 – 0	Walsall	Manchester
19:45	Benarbia 24'; Goater 41'; Wanchope (pen.), 59'	(Report)		Stadium: Maine Road; Attendance: 31,525; Referee: Rob Harris

29 September 2001	Manchester City	0 – 4	Wimbledon	Manchester
15:00		(Report)	Connolly 23', (pen.), 35'; Shipperley 83', 90'	Stadium: Maine Road; Attendance: 32,989; Referee: John Brandwood

13 October 2001	Manchester City	2 – 2	Stockport County	Manchester
15:00	Benarbia 51'; Goater 84'	(Report)	Hurst 50'; Kuqi (pen.), 68'	Stadium: Maine Road; Attendance: 34,214; Referee: David Pugh

16 October 2001	Manchester City	0 – 0	Sheffield United	Manchester
19:45	Horlock (yellow card) 76' (yellow-red card)	(Report)		Stadium: Maine Road; Attendance: 32,454; Referee: Steve Bennett

21 October 2001	Preston North End	2 – 1	Manchester City	Preston
14:15	Healy 50'; Macken 67'	(Report)	Huckerby 37'; Berkovic (red card) 89'	Stadium: Deepdale; Attendance: 21,013; Referee: Mike Dean

23 October 2001	Manchester City	4 – 0	Grimsby Town	Manchester
19:45	Goater 2'; Howey 20'; Huckerby 24', 64'	(Report)		Stadium: Maine Road; Attendance: 30,797; Referee: Mark Cowburn

28 October 2001	Nottingham Forest	1 – 1	Manchester City	Nottingham
17:15	Bart-Williams 7'	(Report)	Goater 9'	Stadium: City Ground; Attendance: 28,266; Referee: John Brandwood

31 October 2001	Barnsley	0 – 3	Manchester City	Barnsley
19:45		(Report)	Goater 14'; Pearce 35'; Huckerby 45'	Stadium: Oakwell Stadium; Attendance: 15,159; Referee: Phil Joslin

3 November 2001	Manchester City	4 – 1	Gillingham	Manchester
15:00	Goater 18', 20', 52'; Huckerby 35'	(Report)	King 71'	Stadium: Maine Road; Attendance: 33,067; Referee: Richard Beeby

17 November 2001	Portsmouth	2 – 1	Manchester City	Portsmouth
12:30	Bradbury 54'; Crouch 78'	(Report)	Huckerby 28'	Stadium: Fratton Park; Attendance: 19,103; Referee: Paul Alcock

24 November 2001	Manchester City	2 – 1	Rotherham United	Manchester
15:00	Negouai 43'; Benarbia 88'	(Report)	Swailes 24'	Stadium: Maine Road; Attendance: 34,223; Referee: Mick Fletcher

1 December 2001	Grimsby Town	0 – 2	Manchester City	Grimsby
15:00		(Report)	Huckerby (pen.), 74'; Goater 90'	Stadium: Blundell Park; Attendance: 7,960; Referee: Paul Rejer

4 December 2001	Millwall	2 – 3	Manchester City	London
19:45	Sadlier 45'; Claridge (pen.), 75'	(Report)	Goater 23'; Huckerby 68'; Wright-Phillips 83'	Stadium: New Den; Attendance: 13,026; Referee: Clive Wilkes

8 December 2001	Crystal Palace	2 – 1	Manchester City	London
15:15	Freedman 31'; Kirovski 45'	(Report)	Goater 68'	Stadium: Selhurst Park; Attendance: 22,080; Referee: Bill Jordan

11 December 2001	Manchester City	1 – 0	Wolverhampton Wanderers	Manchester
19.45	Horlock 21'	(Report)	Lescott (red card) 42'	Stadium: Maine Road; Attendance: 33,639; Referee: Mike Riley

16 December 2001	Manchester City	3 – 1	Bradford City	Manchester
14:15	Mettomo 36'; Horlock 58'; Wright-Phillips 64'	(Report)	Dunne , 15' (o.g.)	Stadium: Maine Road; Attendance: 30,749; Referee: Phil Richards

26 December 2001	Manchester City	0 – 0	West Bromwich Albion	Manchester
15:00	Edghill (yellow card) 48' (yellow-red card)	(Report)		Stadium: Maine Road; Attendance: 34,407; Referee: Roger Furnandiz

29 December 2001	Manchester City	5 – 1	Burnley	Manchester
12:00	Wanchope 2', 28', 45'; Berkovic 38'; Huckerby 90'	(Report)	Thomas-Moore 61'	Stadium: Maine Road; Attendance: 34,250; Referee: Matt Messias

1 January 2002	Sheffield United	1 – 3	Manchester City	Sheffield
15:00	Brown 90'	(Report)	Goater 55'; Berkovic 68'; Wright-Phillips 90'	Stadium: Bramall Lane; Attendance: 26,291; Referee: Alan Wiley

13 January 2002	Manchester City	3 – 1	Norwich City	Manchester
14:15	Tiatto (red card) 12'; Berkovic 43', 65'; Wanchope (pen.), 61'	(Report)	Nielsen 47'	Stadium: Maine Road; Attendance: 31,794; Referee: Roy Pearson

20 January 2002	Watford	1 – 2	Manchester City	Watford
18:15	Wanchope 30'; Helguson , 80' (o.g.)	(Report)	Smith 26'	Stadium: Vicarage Road; Attendance: 17,724; Referee: Dermot Gallagher

30 January 2002	Manchester City	2 – 0	Millwall	Manchester
19:45	Benarbia (red card) 7'; Goater 78', 87'	(Report)		Stadium: Maine Road; Attendance: 30,238; Referee: Peter Walton

3 February 2002	Wimbledon	2 – 1	Manchester City	London
14:00	Shipperley 34', 69'	(Report)	Benarbia 54'; Pearce (red card) 90'	Stadium: Selhurst Park; Attendance: 10,664; Referee: Phil Dowd

10 February 2002	Manchester City	3 – 2	Preston North End	Manchester
14:15	Wright-Phillips 49'; Howey 56'; Wanchope 74'	(Report)	Macken 47'; Anderson 90'	Stadium: Maine Road; Attendance: 34,220; Referee: Anthony Bates

23 February 2002	Walsall	0 – 0	Manchester City	Walsall
15:00		[ (Report)]		Stadium: Bescot Stadium; Attendance: 7,618; Referee: David Crick

27 February 2002	Manchester City	4 – 0	Sheffield Wednesday	Manchester
19:45	Horlock 9'; Huckerby 32'; Berkovic 76'; Goater 88'	(Report)		Stadium: Maine Road; Attendance: 33,682; Referee: Paul Durkin

3 March 2002	Manchester City	4 – 2	Coventry City	Manchester
13:00	Huckerby 15'; Tiatto 35'; Wright-Phillips 42', 71'	(Report)	Mills 19', 88'	Stadium: Maine Road; Attendance: 33,335; Referee: Mike Pike

5 March 2002	Birmingham City	1 – 2	Manchester City	Birmingham
19:45	Johnson 4'	(Report)	Jensen 43'; Horlock 68'	Stadium: St Andrew's; Attendance: 24,160; Referee: Bill Jordan

8 March 2002	Bradford City	0 – 2	Manchester City	Bradford
19:45		(Report)	Huckerby 44'; Macken 90'	Stadium: Valley Parade; Attendance: 18,168; Referee: Phil Dowd

12 March 2002	Crewe Alexandra	1 – 3	Manchester City	Crewe
19:45	Jack 55'	(Report)	Benarbia 30'; Huckerby 45'; Goater 75'	Stadium: Gresty Road; Attendance: 10,092; Referee: Paul Danson

16 March 2002	Manchester City	1 – 0	Crystal Palace	Manchester
15:00	Horlock 10'	(Report)		Stadium: Maine Road; Attendance: 33,637; Referee: Mark Clattenburg

19 March 2002	Stockport County	2 – 1	Manchester City	Stockport
19:45	Hardiker 85', 90'	(Report)	Macken 18'; Goater (red card) 30'	Stadium: Edgeley Park; Attendance: 9,537; Referee: Clive Wilkes

23 March 2002	Rotherham United	1 – 1	Manchester City	Rotherham
15:00	Lee 45'	(Report)	Benarbia 60'	Stadium: Millmoor; Attendance: 11,426; Referee: Dermot Gallagher

30 March 2002	Manchester City	3 – 0	Nottingham Forest	Manchester
15:00	Huckerby 40', 45', (pen.), 84'	(Report)		Stadium: Maine Road; Attendance: 34,345; Referee: Mike Jones

1 April 2002	Wolverhampton Wanderers	0 – 2	Manchester City	Wolverhampton
13:00	Butler (yellow card) 83' (yellow-red card)	(Report)	Wright-Phillips 36', 80'	Stadium: Molineux; Attendance: 28,015; Referee: Graham Barber

6 April 2002	Manchester City	5 – 1	Barnsley	Manchester
13:00	Huckerby 12', 36', 63'; Macken 53', 70'	(Report)	Dyer 43'	Stadium: Maine Road; Attendance: 33,628; Referee: Graham Laws

13 April 2002	Gillingham	1 – 3	Manchester City	Gillingham
15:00	Onuora 34'	(Report)	Horlock 20'; Goater 39'; Huckerby 85'	Stadium: Priestfield Stadium; Attendance: 9,494; Referee: Matt Messias

21 April 2002	Manchester City	3 – 1	Portsmouth	Manchester
15:00	Howey 9'; Goater 27'; Macken 86'	(Report)	Pitt 59'	Stadium: Maine Road; Attendance: 34,657; Referee: Roger Furnandiz

=== League Cup ===
==== Second round ====
11 September 2001	Notts County (England)	2 – 2; 2 – 4 (aet)	(England) Manchester City	Nottingham
19:45	Allsopp (pen.), 68'; Stallard 70'	(Report)	Shuker 61'; Goater 86'; Dickov 92'; Huckerby 103'	Stadium: Meadow Lane; Attendance: 5,972; Referee: Andy Hall

==== Third round ====
10 October 2001	Manchester City (England)	6 – 0	(England) Birmingham City	Manchester
19:45	Huckerby 10', 25', 81', 89'; Luntala , 14' (o.g.); Goater 53'	(Report)		Stadium: Maine Road; Attendance: 13,912; Referee: Rob Styles

==== Fourth round ====
28 November 2001	Blackburn Rovers (England)	2 – 0	(England) Manchester City	Blackburn
19:45	Johansson 44'; D. Johnson 89'	(Report)	Negouai (yellow card) 26' (yellow-red card)	Stadium: Ewood Park; Attendance: 17,907; Referee: Uriah Rennie

=== FA Cup ===
==== Third round ====
5 January 2002	Manchester City (England)	2 – 0	(England) Swindon Town	Manchester
13:00	Wanchope 8'; Horlock 62'	(Report)		Stadium: Maine Road; Attendance: 21,581; Referee: Chris Foy

==== Fourth round ====
27 January 2002	Ipswich Town (England)	1 – 4	(England) Manchester City	Ipswich
19:00	Bent 83'	(Report)	Berkovic 43'; Goater 65', 86'; Huckerby 90'	Stadium: Portman Road; Attendance: 21,119; Referee: Graham Poll

==== Fifth round ====
17 February 2002	Newcastle United (England)	1 – 0	(England) Manchester City	Newcastle
19:00	Solano 59'	(Report)	Dunne (red card) 29'	Stadium: St James' Park; Attendance: 51,020; Referee: Alan Wiley

== Playing statistics ==
Appearances for competitive matches only

No.	Pos.	Name	League		FA Cup		League Cup		Total	
No.	Pos.	Name	Apps	Goals	Apps	Goals	Apps	Goals	Apps	Goals
1	GK	(England) Nicky Weaver	24(1)	0	2(0)	0	2(0)	0	28(1)	0
2	DF	(England) Stuart Pearce	38(0)	3	1(1)	0	3(0)	0	42(1)	3
3	DF	(England) Richard Edghill	9(1)	0	1(2)	0	0	0	10(3)	0
4	DF	(Netherlands) Gerard Wiekens	21(5)	0	1(0)	0	2(0)	0	24(5)	0
5	DF	(Scotland) Andy Morrison	0	0	0	0	0	0	0	0
6	MF	(England) Kevin Horlock	33(9)	7	3(0)	1	2(0)	0	38(9)	8
7	FW	(England) Darren Huckerby	30(8)	20	3(2)	1	2(1)	5	35(11)	26
8	DF	(Australia) Simon Colosimo	0(6)	0	0	0	1(0)	0	1(6)	0
8	FW	(England) Jon Macken	4(4)	5	0	0	0	0	4(4)	5
9	FW	(Scotland) Paul Dickov	0(6)	0	0(1)	0	0(1)	0	0(8)	1
10	FW	(Bermuda) Shaun Goater	42(0)	28	1(1)	2	2(0)	2	45(1)	32
11	MF	(England) Terry Cooke	0	0	0	0	0	0	0	0
13	MF	(Martinique) Christian Negouai	2(2)	1	0(2)	0	2(0)	0	4(4)	1
14	MF	(Israel) Eyal Berkovic	20(5)	6	3(0)	1	2(1)	0	25(6)	7
15	DF	(Norway) Alf-Inge Haaland	0(3)	0	0(1)	0	0	0	0(4)	0
16	DF	(Scotland) Paul Ritchie	0(7)	0	2(1)	0	0(1)	0	2(9)	0
17	DF	(China) Sun Jihai	2(5)	0	0	0	0	0	2(5)	0
18	MF	(Northern Ireland) Jeff Whitley	0(2)	0	0	0	0	0	0(2)	0
19	DF	(Australia) Danny Tiatto	36(1)	1	1(0)	0	2(0)	0	39(1)	1
20	GK	(England) Carlo Nash	22(1)	0	1(0)	0	1(0)	0	24(1)	0
21	MF	(France) Alioune Touré	0(1)	0	0	0	0(1)	0	0(2)	0
22	DF	(Republic of Ireland) Richard Dunne	42(2)	1	3(0)	0	3(0)	0	48(2)	1
23	FW	(Costa Rica) Paulo Wanchope	14(1)	12	2(0)	1	1(0)	0	17(1)	13
24	DF	(England) Steve Howey	34(0)	3	2(0)	0	2(0)	0	38(0)	3
25	DF	(Cameroon) Lucien Mettomo	16(5)	1	0	0	1(1)	0	17(6)	1
26	DF	(England) Tyrone Mears	0(1)	0	0	0	0	0	0(1)	0
27	DF	(England) Stephen Jordan	0	0	0	0	0	0	0	0
28	MF	(England) Tony Grant	2(1)	0	0	0	1(0)	0	3(1)	0
29	MF	(England) Shaun Wright-Phillips	30(4)	8	3(0)	0	1(1)	0	34(5)	8
31	DF	(France) Laurent Charvet	3(0)	0	0	0	0	0	3(0)	0
32	GK	(England) Simon Royce	0	0	0	0	0	0	0	0
32	FW	(England) Leon Mike	1(1)	0	0	0	0	0	1(1)	0
33	FW	(New Zealand) Chris Killen	0(2)	0	0(1)	0	0	0	0(3)	0
35	GK	(Republic of Ireland) Brian Murphy	0	0	0	0	0	0	0	0
36	DF	(Denmark) Niclas Jensen	16(1)	1	2(1)	0	0	0	18(2)	1
36	DF	(England) Danny Granville	12(4)	1	0	0	1(1)	0	13(5)	1
37	MF	(Canada) Terry Dunfield	0	0	0	0	0	0	0	0
38	DF	(Wales) Rhys Day	0	0	0	0	0	0	0	0
39	MF	(Nigeria) Dickson Etuhu	11(1)	0	0	0	1(0)	0	12(1)	0
40	MF	(England) Chris Shuker	0(2)	0	0	0	0(1)	1	0(3)	1
44	MF	(Algeria) Ali Benarbia	38(0)	8	2(0)	0	2(0)	0	42(0)	8

Information current as of 21 April 2002 (end of season)

Last updated: 24 November 2010.
Source: (for appearances, goals and discipline stats.) All match Reports in Games section above

== Goal scorers ==
=== All competitions ===
Scorer	Goals
(Bermuda) Shaun Goater	32
(England) Darren Huckerby	26
(Costa Rica) Paulo Wanchope	13
(Algeria) Ali Benarbia	8
(England) Kevin Horlock	8
(England) Shaun Wright-Phillips	8
(Israel) Eyal Berkovic	7
(England) Jon Macken	5
(England) Steve Howey	3
(England) Stuart Pearce	3
(Scotland) Paul Dickov	1
(Republic of Ireland) Richard Dunne	1
(England) Danny Granville	1
(Denmark) Niclas Jensen	1
(Cameroon) Lucien Mettomo	1
(Martinique) Christian Negouai	1
(England) Chris Shuker	1
(Australia) Danny Tiatto	1

=== Football League Division 1 ===
Scorer	Goals
(Bermuda) Shaun Goater	28
(England) Darren Huckerby	20
(Costa Rica) Paulo Wanchope	12
(Algeria) Ali Benarbia	8
(England) Shaun Wright-Phillips	8
(England) Kevin Horlock	7
(Israel) Eyal Berkovic	6
(England) Jon Macken	5
(England) Steve Howey	3
(England) Stuart Pearce	3
(Republic of Ireland) Richard Dunne	1
(England) Danny Granville	1
(Denmark) Niclas Jensen	1
(Cameroon) Lucien Mettomo	1
(Martinique) Christian Negouai	1
(Australia) Danny Tiatto	1

=== League Cup ===
Scorer	Goals
(England) Darren Huckerby	5
(Bermuda) Shaun Goater	2
(Scotland) Paul Dickov	1
(England) Chris Shuker	1

=== FA Cup ===
Scorer	Goals
(Bermuda) Shaun Goater	2
(Israel) Eyal Berkovic	1
(England) Kevin Horlock	1
(England) Darren Huckerby	1
(Costa Rica) Paulo Wanchope	1

Information current as of 21 April 2002 (end of season)

== See also ==
- Manchester City F.C. seasons
