= 1996–97 Newcastle United F.C. season =

Newcastle United
1996–97 season
- Chairman: John Hall
- Manager: Kevin Keegan (until 8 January); Terry McDermott (caretaker, from 8 January to 14 January); Kenny Dalglish (from 14 January)
- Stadium: St James' Park
- FA Premier League: 2nd
- FA Cup: Fourth round
- League Cup: Fourth round
- FA Charity Shield: Runners-up
- UEFA Cup: Quarter-finals
- Top goalscorer: League: Alan Shearer (25); All: Alan Shearer (28)
- Highest home attendance: 36,582 (vs. Sunderland)
- Lowest home attendance: 28,124 (vs. Halmstad)
- Average home league attendance: 36,467
Home colours	Away colours

The 1996–97 season saw English professional football club Newcastle United participate in the FA Premier League for the fourth consecutive season since their promotion from the Football League First Division in 1993.

== Season summary ==
After the disappointment of finishing runner-up to Manchester United in the previous campaign, despite having at one stage held a 12-point lead over their rivals, the club responded by signing Alan Shearer from Blackburn Rovers in July 1996.

Shearer would go on to become the all-time leading goalscorer in Newcastle United's history, but began his career at the club inauspiciously – his debut came against Manchester United at Wembley Stadium in the 1996 FA Charity Shield, a game that Newcastle lost 4–0. Newcastle quickly recovered and started the league campaign well, winning seven of their opening eight games. A 5–0 victory over Manchester United on 20 October 1996 at St James' Park seemed to confirm that a strong title challenge would again be mounted, but a subsequent poor run of form including a run of seven games without a win, saw the title challenge falter and ultimately culminated in the resignation of manager Kevin Keegan on 7 January 1997. Keegan's replacement, Kenny Dalglish, was appointed on 14 January 1997 and was in charge as United lost 4–3 at Anfield for the second successive year. However, a late season surge in form, including a crucial win at Highbury on 3 May 1997 and a 5–0 rout of Nottingham Forest on the final day of the season, saw the club overtake Liverpool and Arsenal to finish runner-up again to Manchester United and qualify for the Champions League.

Performance in the cup competitions was mixed. The team were knocked out of the League Cup in the fourth round by local rivals Middlesbrough, who went on to reach the final. Ian Woan scored twice in the last fifteen minutes of a fourth round FA Cup tie at St James' Park to knock the home side out of the competition, whilst in the 1996–97 UEFA Cup, Newcastle performed better and reached the quarter-finals but were ultimately beaten 4–0 on aggregate by French side AS Monaco.

== Transfers ==
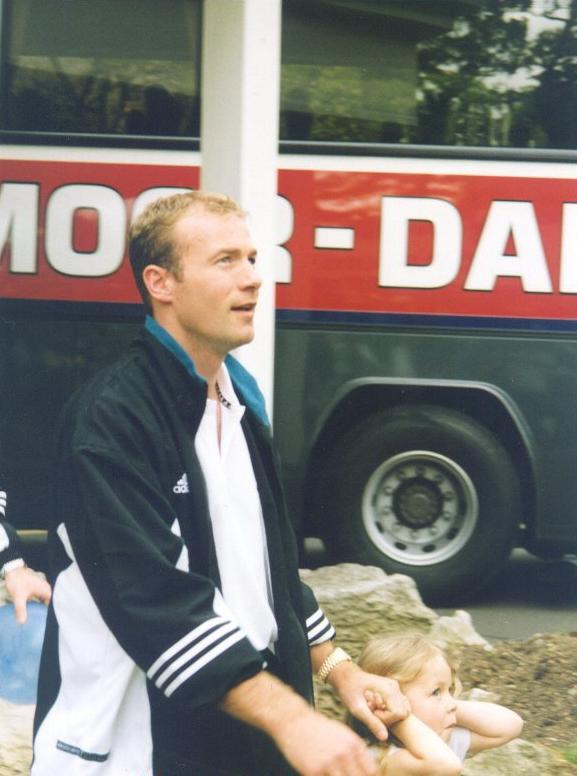
Alan Shearer was the club's only signing in the 1996–97 pre-season. He arrived for a world record £15m fee.

Keegan responded to the previous season's disappointment by breaking the world record transfer fee to sign centre forward Alan Shearer from Blackburn Rovers for £15 million. Shearer, whose five goals made him the top scorer in Euro 96, had supported Newcastle since childhood – he had been a ball-boy at St James' Park on the day that Keegan had left in a helicopter after his final Newcastle appearance as a player. He rejected offers to manage Blackburn and to play for Manchester United to join the club who had rejected him after he had played in goal for two days during a trial as a teenager.

The signing was confirmed by the manager on 30 July 1996 and was officially unveiled a week later in front of hundreds of journalists and around 15,000 fans who queued in the stadium car parks hoping to catch a glimpse of the player. Keegan told the assembled fans "It's [the transfer fee] your money. It's the money you've spent on your replica shirts, the money you've spent on your season tickets and your bonds, the programmes and the Black and White magazines" whilst chairman Sir John Hall stated that "now we must get some silverware in the cupboard. In some ways it's a ridiculous price to pay but we've proved we mean business". Both refuted claims that Les Ferdinand would be sold to part fund the signing, with Keegan stating "despite what some people think, I think they will make a terrific strike force. I think they can both take each other places where they dream about going" and that "they will form the most potent strike-force in world football". It was also confirmed that Ferdinand would give Shearer the number nine shirt for the new season.

Forward Darren Huckerby was loaned out to Millwall F.C in November 1996 before signing for Coventry City F.C for £1 million.

Kenny Dalglish sold Forward Paul Kitson to West Ham United F.C for £1,200,000 in February 1997, whilst Midfielder Des Hamilton was signed in March 1997 from Bradford City F.C. for £2,500,000, having fought off competition from Middlesbrough. Hamilton was injured at the time of his arrival and did not make his debut until the following season.

=== In ===
No.	Position	Player	Transferred from	Fee	Date	Ref
9	FW	(England) Alan Shearer	(England) Blackburn Rovers	£15,000,000	30 July 1996	
22	MF	(England) Des Hamilton	(England) Bradford City	£2,500,000	27 March 1997	

=== Out ===
No.	Position	Player	Transferred to	Fee	Date	Ref
16	FW	(England) Darren Huckerby	(England) Coventry City	£1,000,000	23 November 1996	
28	FW	(England) Paul Kitson	(England) West Ham United	£1,200,000	6 February 1997	

== Managerial changes ==
Brian McNally in the Sunday Mirror said that Keegan had offered to resign after failing to win the league championship in May 1996 but that he was dissuaded from quitting at that time, and that he had offered to leave again after the 1996 Boxing Day defeat at Blackburn Rovers, telling the board that "he had taken the club as far as he could", but was dissuaded from leaving by Douglas Hall. McNally wrote: "the ghost of last season's spectacular championship fade-out still haunts Keegan. The simple truth is that Keegan hasn't mentally recovered from the choking disappointment of blowing the title seven months ago. As Manchester United gnawed away at Newcastle's seemingly unassailable advantage, Keegan became increasingly morose, withdrawn and bewildered". McNally was called to a three-hour meeting with club directors and told that there was no pressure on Keegan from the board and that his position was completely secure. Keegan reacted furiously when questioned about the story at the end of a press conference after the FA Cup tie with Charlton Athletic, storming out after stating "I'm here to talk about the game. You know the guy who wrote that. End of story."

However, on 8 January 1997, Kevin Keegan resigned as manager of Newcastle United. He released a statement which read: "It was my decision alone. I feel I have taken the club as far as I can and that it would be in the best interest of all concerned if I resign now." Despite his previous offers to leave, the resignation drew a shocked reaction from his assistant, Terry McDermott and drew comment from both the Mayor of Newcastle and the leader of the Labour Party, Tony Blair. Several media sources reported outpourings of grief among Newcastle fans though eye-witness Ian Cusack at When Saturday Comes later claimed: "I saw the stage-managed outpourings of false emotion at first hand. The composition of the crowd of around 400 that had gathered at the ground was a sociologist’s wet dream: the retired, the unemployed, the terminally lazy and the socially inadequate..As the untidy throng assembled outside the ground it became clear that this could not be a representative sample of Newcastle fans, if such a thing exists, and that they could be manipulated into acting the way the media wanted...photographers organized posed shots of supposedly broken-hearted youths clinging onto each other for support and news crews interviewed sobbing fans whose expressions often erred too close to smirks to be totally convincing."

McDermott and Arthur Cox were placed in temporary charge of the first team. The board had selected Bobby Robson as their first choice replacement and approached him to offer the position. Robson, a boyhood Newcastle supporter born in nearby Sacriston, was the manager of Barcelona at that time and refused to break his contract with the Catalan club, later stating: "Newcastle is my area, my home, but I turned down the job and I'm not looking back. It was the right job but it came at the wrong time and that's that. I'd barely arrived at Barcelona and I wasn't going to let it go just like that." The board then moved to appoint their second choice, Kenny Dalglish, who had initially been the bookmakers' favourite to take over from Keegan and was out of work after having quit as Director of Football at Blackburn Rovers after they failed to win the FA Premier League in 1996. The board felt that Dalglish would be able to strengthen the side defensively. The appointment was confirmed in a press conference at St James' Park on 14 January 1997, with the new manager telling the press: "The temptation of a job like this was too much to refuse. Kevin has set tremendous foundations here. I just hope that Kevin, having made his decision, is perfectly happy and content with himself."

== Pre-season ==
In July 1996, Newcastle undertook a tour in the Far East, starting in Thailand. After arriving, Keegan voiced his surprise at the many people he saw wearing Newcastle replica shirts, claimed that the official club magazine sold 20,000 copies in the country and that the club were "the biggest rivals to Manchester United worldwide". Newcastle played a Thailand national XI in Bangkok on 30 July, falling behind early in the game but they were level at halftime thanks to a goal from Asprilla and won the game 2–1 after a second half strike from Rob Lee. United then travelled to Singapore to play a Singapore League Select XI at the National Stadium, though the game itself was overshadowed by the announcement of Alan Shearer's transfer – Keegan had to veto plans to parade the new signing in a cavalcade around the stadium even though Shearer was not even named among the substitutes. The match, played in front of a capacity crowd of 50,000, saw Newcastle run out easy 5–0 winners thanks largely to an excellent performance by David Ginola, who scored two of the goals.

The final game of the tour was in Japan against Gamba Osaka. After problems had seen Shearer required to fly on a separate plane and Asprilla held by customs for lack of a visa, Newcastle produced a very poor performance and were beaten 3–1 after two first half goals from Hans Gillhaus and a second half strike by Vjekoslav Škrinjar. Keegan was extremely critical of his players after the game, telling reporters: "I'm embarrassed. This is a tour before what we hope is going to be a championship winning season [but] very few players came out of this match with any credit. Some of our lads thought it was going to be a canter. I just had to stop watching in the second-half. It was poor. As simple as that".

United returned home after the Gamba defeat and played Lincoln City at Sincil Bank. This match saw the first appearance of Alan Shearer in the side – his debut attracted over 200 journalists from around the world – and Shearer marked the occasion with a first half goal from the penalty spot. Philippe Albert scored a second after the break to give United a 2–0 win. Newcastle completed their pre-season preparations with a 2–1 victory at Belgian league runners-up Anderlecht. Shearer and Asprilla combined just before the half time interval and the latter finished calmly to give the visitors a 1–0 half-time lead. A disputed penalty was awarded against Keith Gillespie on 60 minutes which allowed Gilles De Bilde to equalize, but United won the game thanks to a low finish by Ginola.

=== Pre-season results ===
30 July 1996	Thailand	1–2	Newcastle United	Bangkok
	Srithong-in 22'		Asprilla 45'; Lee 59'	Attendance: 18,000

1 August 1996	S.League All Stars	0–5	Newcastle United	Kallang
			Ferdinand 7'; Ginola 25' (pen.), 73'; Kitson 72', 88'	Stadium: National Stadium, Singapore; Attendance: 50,000

4 August 1996	Gamba Osaka	3–1	Newcastle United	Suita
	Gillhaus 16', 41'; Škrinjar 8'		Ferdinand 89'	Stadium: Osaka Expo '70 Stadium; Attendance: 6,949

9 August 1996	Lincoln City	0–2	Newcastle United	Lincoln
			Shearer 33' (pen.); Albert 60'	Stadium: Sincil Bank; Attendance: 10,069

13 August 1996	Anderlecht	1–2	Newcastle United	Anderlecht
	de Bilde 61'		Asprilla 45'; Ginola 62'	Stadium: Constant Vanden Stock Stadium; Attendance: 18,000

== Charity Shield ==
Manchester United completed a domestic double in the previous season, leading to the FA voting on 14 May 1996 to invite Newcastle to play them in the FA Charity Shield at Wembley, rather than FA Cup runners up Liverpool F.C. The invitation was accepted on 22 May, with Newcastle defender Steve Watson telling the press: "It's brilliant news...It's not the way we wanted to qualify for the Charity Shield – we wanted to get there by winning the League. But it will be a great day for our fans and gives us a real lift before the start of the season."

Although the Community Shield has been described by some media sources as a "glorified friendly", the 1996 renewal sparked considerable local interest as it was to be the club's first appearance at Wembley since losing the 1976 League Cup final to Manchester City. The signing of Alan Shearer less than one week earlier had sparked what several media outlets were referring to as "Shearer-Mania" on Tyneside and demand for tickets to see the £15 million signing on his competitive debut was huge, with the original Newcastle allocation of 40,000 quickly sold out and fans queuing for three days to purchase some of the additional 5,000 tickets which were released for sale on 5 August. Ian Ridley of the Independent summed up the prevailing mood: "It [the Charity Shield] is a forgotten match once the real business of the season begins, but this year's may linger a little longer in the memory for 15 million and one reasons. The prospect of Alan Shearer's appearance for Newcastle United against the club who also tried to sign him has seen enthusiasm reach a rare pitch. The other reason is that the opponents are Manchester United, with whom Newcastle have become embroiled in one of the most intense rivalries of the modern game."

After an intense build-up, Newcastle fans were left ultimately disappointed as their side were beaten in what Journalist David Lacey described as, "the most passionate Charity Shield in living memory by the second biggest margin since the occasion moved to Wembley 22 years earlier". First half goals from man-of-the-match Cantona and Nicky Butt saw the champions lead 2–0 at the break and, despite Newcastle pressure for half an hour of the second half, the lead was held comfortably before two more goals in the last five minutes, by David Beckham and Roy Keane, gave the Manchester side a comprehensive 4–0 victory after a Newcastle performance described by writer Harry Harris as "not just lamentable, but deplorable" and by manager Keegan as "abysmal". Newcastle's challenge for the title in the upcoming season was subsequently brought into question, with the Daily Mirror commenting, "Kevin Keegan has a big task in turning his team of stars into a unit which can challenge for the title. Keegan's team may well overwhelm some of the Premiership minnows but are clearly going to have to improve to compete with the likes of United. However these are early days and once Shearer settles in, Newcastle will be formidable opponents."

11 August 1996
15:00 UTC+1

Manchester United	4–0	Newcastle United
Cantona 24'; Butt 30'; Beckham 85'; Keane 87'	Report

Wembley Stadium, London
Attendance: 73,214
Referee: Paul Durkin (Dorset)

Manchester United	Newcastle United

GK	1	(Denmark) Peter Schmeichel
RB	12	(England) Phil Neville
CB	6	(England) Gary Pallister
CB	4	(England) David May
LB	3	(Republic of Ireland) Denis Irwin		(substituted off) 45'
RM	10	(England) David Beckham
CM	8	(England) Nicky Butt		(substituted off) 41'
CM	16	(Republic of Ireland) Roy Keane	(yellow card) 40'
LM	11	(Wales) Ryan Giggs
CF	18	(England) Paul Scholes		(substituted off) 65'
CF	7	(France) Eric Cantona (c)	(yellow card) 65'
Substitutes:
GK	17	(Netherlands) Raimond van der Gouw
DF	2	(England) Gary Neville		(substituted on) 45'
DF	19	(Norway) Ronny Johnsen
MF	14	(Netherlands) Jordi Cruyff		(substituted on) 65'
MF	15	(Czech Republic) Karel Poborský		(substituted on) 41'
FW	13	(Scotland) Brian McClair
FW	20	(Norway) Ole Gunnar Solskjær
Manager:
(Scotland) Alex Ferguson

GK	1	(Czech Republic) Pavel Srníček
RB	19	(England) Steve Watson
CB	5	(England) Darren Peacock
CB	27	(Belgium) Philippe Albert	(yellow card) 16'
LB	3	(England) John Beresford (c)
RM	8	(England) Peter Beardsley		(substituted off) 75'
CM	4	(England) David Batty
CM	7	(England) Rob Lee
LM	14	(France) David Ginola		(substituted off) 77'
CF	9	(England) Alan Shearer
CF	10	(England) Les Ferdinand
Substitutes:
GK	15	(Trinidad and Tobago) Shaka Hislop
DF	2	(England) Warren Barton
DF	6	(England) Steve Howey
MF	18	(Northern Ireland) Keith Gillespie		(substituted on) 77'
MF	20	(England) Lee Clark
FW	11	(Colombia) Faustino Asprilla		(substituted on) 75'
FW	28	(England) Paul Kitson
Manager:
(England) Kevin Keegan

Match rules

- 90 minutes
- Penalty shootout if scores level
- Seven named substitutes
- Maximum of three substitutions

== Premier League ==
=== August – October ===
Newcastle started their Premier League campaign on 17 August 1996 with a trip to Goodison Park to play Everton. Peter Beardsley and Darren Peacock were dropped from the starting line-up but excellent performances by Neville Southall in goal and future Newcastle striker Duncan Ferguson helped Everton win 2–0. Keegan afterwards claimed that he was worried about the lack of invention from his side and their inability to win games when not playing well. Four days later United beat Wimbledon by the same scoreline at home to claim their first win of the season. Batty opened the scoring with a 35-yard lob over goalkeeper Neil Sullivan similar to that executed by David Beckham for Manchester United a few days earlier before Shearer scored his first competitive goal for the club with a free-kick on 88 minutes. On 24 August Sheffield Wednesday travelled to St James' Park and recovered from an early Shearer penalty to win 2–1 thanks to goals from Peter Atherton and Guy Whittingham. The win put Wednesday top of the league at the end of August with three wins from three games and Newcastle in tenth with fans criticising the team and manager Keegan, who told reporters "I think anyone would have the right to suggest there is a crisis. That was our worst home performance in my reign. We haven't started yet and we will have to start soon if we have ambitions to win anything, certainly the League."

United's first game of September saw them make the short trip to Wearside to face unbeaten local rivals Sunderland at Roker Park in the 117th Tyne–Wear derby – the last derby to be played at the stadium before Sunderland's relocation to the Stadium of Light. Beardsley was restored to the side and he cancelled out Martin Scott's opening goal with a header on 52 minutes before Les Ferdinand headed home a Ginola cross ten minutes later to win the game 2–1. The winning goals were greeted with near silence as a result of the ban on away fans at the match. A Ferdinand brace on 7 September gave Newcastle another 2–1 away win, this time at White Hart Lane against Tottenham Hotspur before a Shearer penalty and another Ferdinand goal saw United come from a goal down once more to record a third consecutive 2–1 victory, this time at home to Shearer's former club Blackburn Rovers, to move up to third in the table. A trip to Elland Road on 21 September yielded a further three points after Carlton Palmer was sent off and Shearer scored his first goal from open play on the hour after excellent approach play by Beardsley. Beardsley's performance was again praised afterwards, with journalist Colin Royce noting: " If the pounds 22 million partnership of Shearer and Asprilla is to develop into the "Dream Team" Keegan thinks it might, then they are going to need plenty of assistance from veteran Beardsley...It's all held together by Beardo in midfield. The little fella is propelling Newcastle back towards the top, which is where they belong." Keegan's side then faced Aston Villa in what writer Colin Diball described afterwards as "the most amazing match of the season so far". Two first half goals from Ferdinand, taking his total to eight in six games, and another from Shearer had cancelled out an early goal by Dwight Yorke to give the hosts a 3–1 half-time lead. However, Yorke completed his hat-trick in the second half and a Steve Howey goal on 67 minutes was required to secure a 4–3 home win and move the team up to second place in the table. The partnership between Ferdinand and Shearer appeared to be flourishing, with The Independent noting "Ferdinand looks the perfect foil for Shearer, making nonsense of early-season suggestions by critics that they were an unsuitable pairing for club or country."

Beardsley's good form since returning to the side continued and he was man-of-the-match in a 1–0 win at Derby County on 12 October. It was Newcastle's sixth successive victory and their fourth away from home in a row. Afterwards, Keegan said "We look more resilient. No one's calling us entertainers anymore - we're more like grinders now. We're sticking the odd chance away and defending well. Which you (the press) won't want to write because you like saying how badly we defend." Newcastle's next fixture was at home to champions Manchester United on 20 October 1996. Despite their impressive league form, the pre-match focus remained on apparent defensive shortcomings. Keegan ignored the criticism and sent his side out with his usual instructions to entertain and the result for his team was "their crowning achievement, a sign that their swashbuckling football that had lost them the title in tragi-comic circumstances the previous seasons could endure." First-half goals from Peacock and Ginola saw the home side lead 2–0 at the interval before further goals from Ferdinand, Shearer and a lob over Schmeichel by Albert – described by writer Steve Millar as "magnificent; fit to win any game" – gave Newcastle a comprehensive 5–0 win. The win left Newcastle top of the league, three points clear of Liverpool and Arsenal and five ahead of Manchester United.

Supporters were brought back down to earth with news that Shearer would be sidelined for at least six Premier League games as a result of a groin injury which required surgery. In their first game without the injured striker, United were beaten 2–0 at Filbert Street against newly promoted Leicester City after goal from Steve Claridge and Emile Heskey and a brilliant performance by home goalkeeper Kasey Keller.

=== November – December ===
Newcastle's first game of November was the Tyne–Tees derby with Middlesbrough at St James' Park. Two goals from Beardsley, in his 700th career league and cup match, helped his side to a 3–1 win. Beardsley was on the scoresheet again – the 200th goal of his league career – on 16 November to rescue a point with an 83rd-minute equaliser in a 1–1 draw at home to West Ham United in a match where the hosts hit the woodwork four times and saw Les Ferdinand leave the pitch with a depressed fracture of the cheekbone which ruled him out for six weeks. Shearer made an early return from injury in time to score an equaliser against Chelsea on 23 November 1996 after Gianluca Vialli had given Chelsea the lead on 24 minutes. Newcastle held on for a point despite David Batty being sent off for the first time in his career for an elbow on Mark Hughes, for a final score of 1–1. On 30 November Newcastle relinquished their place at the top of the table to Arsenal after the latter won 2–1 at St James' Park, despite having played 68 minutes with ten men after Tony Adams was sent off for a professional foul from Shearer. Goals from Lee Dixon and Ian Wright were enough to give the visitors three points and Keegan afterwards told reporters: "We were poor throughout. It wouldn't take too many performances like that before I change personnel. It was an extremely disappointing performance. At times it looked as if we had 10 men and they had 11. I've got no qualms about the result - justice was done."

United's next league match was on 9 December at the City Ground against Nottingham Forest. Despite being bottom of the table, Forest held the visitors to a 0–0 draw – Newcastle's first goalless draw in 74 matches – in the first game in which Shearer and Ferdinand had played together since the 5–0 win against Manchester United. The result left Keegan's side five points behind leaders Arsenal albeit with a game in hand. The result confirmed Newcastle's loss of form; they had taken six points from their last six matches. The poor run continued on 17 December when they lost 2–1 at Coventry City. The hosts established as two-goal lead inside the first half an hour thanks to a goal and an assist from Darren Huckerby, who was transferred to Coventry from Newcastle a month earlier due to Keegan's decision to withdraw the reserve side out of the reserve league. As the season moved into the festive period of fixtures, Newcastle welcomed league leaders Liverpool to St James'. Such was the home side's poor form, they entered this match as underdogs – the first time they had done so at home under Keegan. Shearer gave United the lead after a Ferdinand header was saved by David James on 28 minutes, only for Fowler to equalise seconds before the half-time whistle. Despite several chances, neither side scored in the second half and both teams had to settle for a 1–1 draw which left Liverpool three points clear of Arsenal in second at Christmas and Newcastle level with Manchester United on 31 points but seven adrift of Liverpool in sixth place. Newcastle's run of games without a win continued on Boxing Day when they were beaten 1–0 by Blackburn Rovers at Ewood Park where Shearer was subjected to abuse from home fans on his return to his former club. The defeat prompted the manager to say: "we didn't deserve to win but we still had two or three very good chances. We are not playing well - we can't kid anyone about that". The defeat prompted journalist Alan Nixon to comment that Keegan's side "appear to be fading from the Championship race", however, United re-found their best form just two days later at home when winning their first league game in almost two months by beating Tottenham Hotspur. Two goals each from Shearer, Ferdinand and Lee saw United overwhelm their opponents, though The Independent noted that: "the fulcrum of much of Newcastle's sweeping play was the brilliant Peter Beardsley, restored to the central attacking support role in which he schemes – even three weeks short of his 36th birthday – like a classic inside-forward." Assistant manager Terry McDermott told reporters afterwards: "that's what I would call a classic Newcastle United performance. We have come in for a lot of criticism and this was the perfect answer. It was a magnificent performance and the score could easily have reached double figures. We hadn't had a good Christmas but those seven goals have changed all that. We never believed we had blown the title. We're certainly not out of the race. People will write us off at their peril." The result meant that Newcastle finished 1996 by moving back to within five points of leaders Liverpool, with Manchester United in second place.

=== January – March ===
Newcastle began the new year by confirming their return to form with a 3–0 home win over Leeds United. Two goals from Shearer and a late Ferdinand goal were enough to give the home side three points and close the gap on Liverpool, who lost 1–0 at Chelsea, in what was Keegan's last match in charge. Terry McDermott was placed in temporary charge for the game at Villa Park. Two goals in 21 minutes from Shearer and Clark gave United the lead but replies from Yorke and Milošević saw the game finish 2–2. McDermott later dedicated the performance and result to Keegan and claimed to be proud of the players reaction to Keegan's departure. Dalglish took charge for the first time when his new side travelled to The Dell to face Southampton. Newcastle, who had not won at Southampton in 25 years, once again established a two-goal lead, through Ferdinand and Clark. However, a mistake by Hislop on 88 minutes gifted a goal to Neil Maddison and one minute later Le Tissier scored a goal from thirty yards, for a 2–2 final score. The month ended with a home game against Everton on 29 January. United performed poorly in the first half and were fortunate to trail at half-time only by a single goal scored by future Newcastle player Gary Speed after three minutes and the team were booed off the pitch at the break. However, the introduction of Asprilla galvanised the home side and goals from Ferdinand, Lee, Shearer and Elliott in the last sixteen minutes gave the hosts a 4–1 victory.

February started with a home game against Leicester City. Robbie Elliot put the home side ahead but profligacy in front of goal was punished when Matt Elliott, Steve Claridge and Emile Heskey scored in the second half to give the away side a 3–1 lead. However, Shearer then led what one report called "an unbelievable revival" – firstly firing home a powerful free-kick on 77 minutes to reduce the arrears to 3–2, shooting home again on 85 minutes to equalise before finishing a flowing passing move in injury time to complete a 13-minute hat-trick and give the hosts three points and keep them five behind the league leaders, albeit having played a game more. On 22 February, United travelled to the Riverside Stadium for the Tees–Tyne derby and prevailed 1–0 thanks to a ninth minute Ferdinand goal which kept alive the visitors' faint title hopes.

On 1 March Southampton visited St James' Park and inflicted Kenny Dalglish's first league defeat as Newcastle manager thanks to Matt Le Tissier's seventh goal in nine games against a home side playing without the injured Shearer and who saw Ferdinand also succumb to an injury at half-time. The defeat dealt a severe blow to lingering title hopes but Dalglish refused to contemplate that the title challenge was over, telling reporters afterwards: "no one should start thinking that this is the end of the title race. We're a few points worse off after losing - but nothing has been decided yet." United the travelled to Anfield, just under one year since losing 4–3 in a match regularly cited as the best Premier League game ever played. The odds on a repeat of that scoreline were 100/1 but remarkably the teams played out another 4–3 game, though the score somewhat flattered Newcastle; indeed, The Independent reported that "they [Liverpool] routed Newcastle. Liverpool were creating chances at will. It was too easy. The match was won. Newcastle had been abject. The scoreline was identical to last year's thriller, the circumstances somewhat different." Liverpool raced into a 3–0 half-time lead and were in complete control even after Keith Gillespie scored what looked like a consolation goal on 71 minutes. However, goals from Asprilla and Warren Barton in the last five minutes seemed to have rescued a point for the visitors until Robbie Fowler scored a winning goal two minutes into stoppage time. The result left United nine points behind Manchester United and eight behind Liverpool at the top of the table.

Newcastle responded by beating Coventry City 4–0 at St James' Park. Despite the absence of Shearer and Ferdinand through injury, goals from Watson, Lee, Beardsley and Elliott saw the home side win comfortably in a match notable for an excellent performance from Asprilla and a performance from referee Gerald Ashby described by writer John Edwards as "the most wretched performance I've ever seen from a top-flight official". March concluded with a trip to Selhurst Park on 23 March 1997 to face Wimbledon. Another excellent Asprilla performance, this time capped with a second-half goal, was enough to secure a 1–1 draw though claims from Dalglish that the title was still a realistic proposition were mocked by Dons manager Joe Kinnear; indeed, the gap to Manchester United was by this time 11 points and one bookmaker had priced Newcastle at 33/1 to claim the title.

== Appearances, goals and cards ==
(Substitute appearances in brackets)

No.	Pos.	Name	League		FA Cup		League Cup		UEFA Cup		Charity Shield		Total		Discipline	
No.	Pos.	Name	Apps	Goals	Apps	Goals	Apps	Goals	Apps	Goals	Apps	Goals	Apps	Goals	Yellow card	Red card
1	GK	(Czech Republic) Pavel Srníček	22	0	0	0	1	0	6	0	1	0	30	0	?	?
2	DF	(England) Warren Barton	14 (3)	1	1 (1)	0	1	0	4 (2)	0	0	0	20 (6)	1	?	?
3	DF	(England) John Beresford	18 (1)	0	3	0	0	0	3 (1)	0	1	0	25 (2)	0	?	?
4	MF	(England) David Batty	32	1	3	0	2	0	7	0	1	0	44	1	?	?
5	DF	(England) Darren Peacock	35	1	3	0	2	0	8	0	1	0	49	1	?	?
6	DF	(England) Steve Howey	8	1	0	0	0	0	1	0	0	0	9	1	?	?
7	MF	(England) Rob Lee	32 (1)	5	2	1	1	0	8	0	1	0	44 (1)	6	?	?
8	MF	(England) Peter Beardsley	22 (3)	5	3	0	2	1	6	2	1	0	34 (3)	8	?	?
9	FW	(England) Alan Shearer	31	25	3	1	1	1	4	1	1	0	40	28	?	?
10	FW	(England) Les Ferdinand	30 (1)	16	2 (1)	1	1	0	4	4	1	0	38 (2)	21	?	?
11	FW	(Colombia) Faustino Asprilla	17 (7)	4	0	0	2	0	6	5	0 (1)	0	25 (8)	9	?	?
14	MF	(France) David Ginola	20 (4)	1	2	0	2	0	6 (1)	1	1	0	31 (5)	2	?	?
15	GK	(Trinidad and Tobago) Shaka Hislop	16	0	3	0	1	0	2	0	0	0	22	0	?	?
17	MF	(Republic of Ireland) Jimmy Crawford	0 (2)	0	0	0	0	0	0	0	0	0	0 (2)	0	?	?
18	MF	(Northern Ireland) Keith Gillespie	23 (9)	1	1 (1)	0	1	0	6 (2)	0	0 (1)	0	31 (13)	1	?	?
19	DF	(England) Steve Watson	33 (3)	1	2 (1)	0	0 (1)	0	4 (1)	0	1	0	40 (6)	1	?	?
20	MF	(England) Lee Clark	9 (1)	2	2 (1)	1	1	0	2 (3)	0	0	0	14 (5)	3	?	?
26	DF	(England) Robbie Elliott	29	7	1 (1)	0	2	0	4 (1)	0	0	0	36 (2)	7	?	?
27	DF	(Belgium) Philippe Albert	27	2	2	0	2	0	7 (1)	1	1	0	39 (1)	3	?	?
28	FW	(England) Paul Kitson	0 (3)	0	0	0	0 (2)	0	0 (1)	0	0	0	0 (6)	0	?	?
29	GK	(England) Steve Harper	0	0	0	0	0	0	0	0	0	0	0	0	?	?
30	DF	(Northern Ireland) Aaron Hughes	0	0	0	0	0	0	0	0	0	0	0	0	?	?
31	MF	(England) Paul Barrett	0	0	0	0	0	0	0	0	0	0	0	0	?	?
33	DF	(England) Stuart Elliott	0	0	0	0	0	0	0	0	0	0	0	0	?	?

== Players ==
=== First-team squad ===
Squad at end of season

Note: Flags indicate national team as defined under FIFA eligibility rules; some limited exceptions apply. Players may hold more than one non-FIFA nationality.

No.	Pos.	Nation	Player
1	GK	CZE	Pavel Srníček
2	DF	ENG	Warren Barton
3	DF	ENG	John Beresford
4	MF	ENG	David Batty
5	DF	ENG	Darren Peacock
6	DF	ENG	Steve Howey
7	MF	ENG	Rob Lee (captain)
8	MF	ENG	Peter Beardsley
9	FW	ENG	Alan Shearer
10	FW	ENG	Les Ferdinand
11	FW	COL	Faustino Asprilla
14	MF	FRA	David Ginola
15	GK	TRI	Shaka Hislop

No.	Pos.	Nation	Player
17	MF	IRL	Jimmy Crawford
18	MF	NIR	Keith Gillespie
19	DF	ENG	Steve Watson
20	MF	ENG	Lee Clark
22	MF	ENG	Des Hamilton
25	FW	ENG	Paul Brayson
26	DF	ENG	Robbie Elliott
27	DF	BEL	Philippe Albert
29	GK	ENG	Steve Harper
30	DF	NIR	Aaron Hughes
31	MF	ENG	Paul Barrett
33	MF	ENG	Stuart Elliott

=== Left club during season ===
Note: Flags indicate national team as defined under FIFA eligibility rules; some limited exceptions apply. Players may hold more than one non-FIFA nationality.

No.	Pos.	Nation	Player
16	FW	ENG	Darren Huckerby (to Coventry City)
23	MF	ENG	Chris Holland (to Birmingham City)

No.	Pos.	Nation	Player
28	FW	ENG	Paul Kitson (to West Ham United)

=== Reserves ===
The following players did not appear for the first-team this season.

Note: Flags indicate national team as defined under FIFA eligibility rules; some limited exceptions apply. Players may hold more than one non-FIFA nationality.

No.	Pos.	Nation	Player
—	GK	ENG	Peter Keen
—	DF	ENG	David Beharall
—	DF	SCO	Steven Caldwell

No.	Pos.	Nation	Player
—	MF	ENG	Paul Arnison
—	MF	ENG	Jamie McClen
—	FW	ENG	Michael Chopra

=== Trialists ===
Note: Flags indicate national team as defined under FIFA eligibility rules; some limited exceptions apply. Players may hold more than one non-FIFA nationality.

No.	Pos.	Nation	Player
—	FW	VIN	Rodney Jack (on trial from Torquay United)
—	GK	FRA	Thomas Kokkinis (on trial from Metz)

No.	Pos.	Nation	Player
—	MF	ISL	Bjarni Guðjónsson (on trial from ÍA)
—	DF	SWE	Olof Mellberg (on trial from Degerfors IF)

== Coaching staff ==
Position	Staff
Manager	(Scotland) Kenny Dalglish
Assistant manager	(England) Terry McDermott
First-team coach	(England) Arthur Cox
Goalkeeping coach	(England)
Development coach	(England) Nigel Pearson
Reserve team coach	(England) John Carver
Chief scout	(Scotland) Steve Clarke

Last updated: 3 May 2011

== Final league table ==
Pos	Team	Pld	W	D	L	GF	GA	GD	Pts	Qualification or relegation
1	Manchester United (C)	38	21	12	5	76	44	+32	75	Qualification for the Champions League group stage
2	Newcastle United	38	19	11	8	73	40	+33	68	Qualification for the Champions League second qualifying round
3	Arsenal	38	19	11	8	62	32	+30	68	Qualification for the UEFA Cup first round (Note: Aston Villa was rewarded entry to the UEFA Cup through UEFA Fair Play ranking.)
4	Liverpool	38	19	11	8	62	37	+25	68	Qualification for the UEFA Cup first round
5	Aston Villa	38	17	10	11	47	34	+13	61	Qualification for the UEFA Cup first round

Source: Premier League
Rules for classification: 1) points; 2) goal difference; 3) number of goals scored.
(C) Champions
Notes:

Results summary

Overall								Home						Away					
Pld	W	D	L	GF	GA	GD	Pts	W	D	L	GF	GA	GD	W	D	L	GF	GA	GD
38	19	11	8	73	40	+33	68	13	3	3	54	20	+34	6	8	5	19	20	−1

Source: Statto

Results by round

Round	1	2	3	4	5	6	7	8	9	10	11	12	13	14	15	16	17	18	19	20	21	22	23	24	25	26	27	28	29	30	31	32	33	34	35	36	37	38
Ground	A	H	H	A	A	H	A	H	A	H	A	H	H	A	H	A	A	H	A	H	H	A	A	H	H	A	H	A	H	A	H	A	H	H	A	A	A	H
Result	L	W	L	W	W	W	W	W	W	W	L	W	D	D	L	D	L	D	L	W	W	D	D	W	W	W	L	L	W	D	D	D	W	W	W	D	D	W
Position	16	10	13	8	6	3	2	2	1	1	2	1	1	1	2	4	4	6	6	5	4	4	4	4	4	3	4	4	4	4	4	5	4	4	4	4	3	2

Source: Statto.com
A = Away; H = Home; W = Win; D = Draw; L = Loss

== Match results ==
=== FA Premier League ===
17 August 1996	Everton	2–0	Newcastle United	Liverpool
	Unsworth 29' (pen.); Speed 40'			Stadium: Goodison Park; Attendance: 40,117

21 August 1996	Newcastle United	2–0	Wimbledon	Newcastle upon Tyne
	Batty 3'; Shearer 88'			Stadium: St James' Park; Attendance: 36,385

24 August 1996	Newcastle United	1–2	Sheffield Wednesday	Newcastle upon Tyne
	Shearer 13' (pen.)		Atherton 15'; Whittingham 80'	Stadium: St James' Park; Attendance: 36,452

4 September 1996	Sunderland	1–2	Newcastle United	Sunderland
	Scott 19' (pen.)		Beardsley 52'; Ferdinand 62'	Stadium: Roker Park; Attendance: 22,037

7 September 1996	Tottenham Hotspur	1–2	Newcastle United	London
	Allen 28'		Ferdinand 37', 61'	Stadium: White Hart Lane; Attendance: 32,535

14 September 1996	Newcastle United	2–1	Blackburn Rovers	Newcastle upon Tyne
	Shearer 45' (pen.); Ferdinand 61'		Sutton 85'	Stadium: St James' Park; Attendance: 36,424

21 September 1996	Leeds United	0–1	Newcastle United	Leeds
			Shearer 59'	Stadium: Elland Road; Attendance: 36,070

30 September 1996	Newcastle United	4–3	Aston Villa	Newcastle upon Tyne
	Ferdinand 5', 22'; Shearer 38'; Howey 67'		Yorke 4', 59', 69'; Draper (red card) 43'	Stadium: St James' Park; Attendance: 36,400

12 October 1996	Derby County	0–1	Newcastle United	Derby
			Shearer 76'	Stadium: Baseball Ground; Attendance: 18,092

20 October 1996	Newcastle United	5–0	Manchester United	Newcastle upon Tyne
17:00	Peacock 12'; Ginola 30'; Ferdinand 63'; Shearer 75'; Albert 83'			Stadium: St James' Park; Attendance: 36,579; Referee: Steve Dunn

26 October 1996	Leicester City	2–0	Newcastle United	Leicester
	Claridge 17'; Heskey 79'			Stadium: Filbert Street; Attendance: 21,134

3 November 1996	Newcastle United	3–1	Middlesbrough	Newcastle upon Tyne
	Beardsley 40' (pen.), 69'; Lee 74'		Beck 88'	Stadium: St James' Park; Attendance: 36,577

16 November 1996	Newcastle United	1–1	West Ham United	Newcastle upon Tyne
	Beardsley 83'		Rowland 23'	Stadium: St James' Park; Attendance: 36,552

23 November 1996	Chelsea	1–1	Newcastle United	London
	Vialli 24'		Shearer 41'; Batty (yellow card) 52' (red card)	Stadium: Stamford Bridge; Attendance: 28,401

30 November 1996	Newcastle United	1–2	Arsenal	Newcastle upon Tyne
	Shearer 21'		Dixon 11'; Adams (yellow card) 22' (red card); Wright 60'	Stadium: St James' Park; Attendance: 36,565

9 December 1996	Nottingham Forest	0–0	Newcastle United	Nottingham
15:00				Stadium: City Ground; Attendance: 25,762

17 December 1996	Coventry City	2–1	Newcastle United	Coventry
	Huckerby 6'; McAllister 31'		Shearer 61'	Stadium: Highfield Road; Attendance: 21,538

23 December 1996	Newcastle United	1–1	Liverpool	Newcastle upon Tyne
	Shearer 28'		Fowler 45'	Stadium: St James' Park; Attendance: 36,570

26 December 1996	Blackburn Rovers	1–0	Newcastle United	Blackburn
	Gallacher 75'			Stadium: Ewood Park; Attendance: 30,398

28 December 1996	Newcastle United	7–1	Tottenham Hotspur	Newcastle upon Tyne
	Shearer 20', 82'; Ferdinand 22', 59'; Lee 61', 88'; Albert 79'		Nielsen 89'	Stadium: St James' Park; Attendance: 36,308

1 January 1997	Newcastle United	3–0	Leeds United	Newcastle upon Tyne
	Shearer 4', 77'; Ferdinand 87'			Stadium: St James' Park; Attendance: 36,489

11 January 1997	Aston Villa	2–2	Newcastle United	Birmingham
	Yorke 39'; Milošević 52'		Shearer 16'; Clark 21'	Stadium: Villa Park; Attendance: 39,339

18 January 1997	Southampton	2–2	Newcastle United	Southampton
	Maddison 88'; Le Tissier 89'		Ferdinand 14'; Clark 82'	Stadium: The Dell; Attendance: 15,251

29 January 1997	Newcastle United	4–1	Everton	Newcastle upon Tyne
	Ferdinand 74'; Lee 79'; Shearer 83' (pen.); Elliott 90'		Speed 3'	Stadium: St James' Park; Attendance: 36,426

2 February 1997	Newcastle United	4–3	Leicester City	Newcastle upon Tyne
	R. Elliott 3'; Shearer 77', 83', 90'		M. Elliott 55'; Claridge 60'; Heskey 68'	Stadium: St James' Park; Attendance: 36,396

22 February 1997	Middlesbrough	0–1	Newcastle United	Middlesbrough
			Ferdinand 8'	Stadium: Riverside Stadium; Attendance: 30,063

1 March 1997	Newcastle United	0–1	Southampton	Newcastle upon Tyne
			Le Tissier 56'	Stadium: St James' Park; Attendance: 36,446

10 March 1997	Liverpool	4–3	Newcastle United	Liverpool
	McManaman 29'; Berger 30'; Fowler 42', 90'		Gillespie 71'; Asprilla 87'; Barton 88'	Stadium: Anfield; Attendance: 40,751

15 March 1997	Newcastle United	4–0	Coventry City	Newcastle upon Tyne
	Barton 12'; Lee 45'; Beardsley 76' (pen.); Elliott 87'		Borrows (yellow card) 71' (red card)	Stadium: St James' Park; Attendance: 36,571

23 March 1997	Wimbledon	1–1	Newcastle United	London
	Leonhardsen 28'		Asprilla 53'	Stadium: Selhurst Park; Attendance: 23,175

5 April 1997	Newcastle United	1–1	Sunderland	Newcastle upon Tyne
	Shearer 77'		Gray 32'	Stadium: St James' Park; Attendance: 36,582; Referee: Graham Poll

13 April 1997	Sheffield Wednesday	1–1	Newcastle United	Sheffield
	Pembridge 57'		Elliott 35'	Stadium: Hillsborough; Attendance: 33,798; Referee: Mike Riley

16 April 1997	Newcastle United	3–1	Chelsea	Newcastle upon Tyne
	Shearer 12', 35'; Asprilla 30'		Burley 62'	Stadium: St James' Park; Attendance: 36,320

19 April 1997	Newcastle United	3–1	Derby County	Newcastle upon Tyne
	Elliott 12'; Ferdinand 52'; Shearer 75'		Sturridge 1'	Stadium: St James' Park; Attendance: 36,553

3 May 1997	Arsenal	0–1	Newcastle United	London
			Elliott 44'; Gillespie (red card) 79'	Stadium: Arsenal Stadium; Attendance: 38,179

6 May 1997	West Ham United	0–0	Newcastle United	London
				Stadium: Boleyn Ground; Attendance: 24,617

8 May 1997	Manchester United	0–0	Newcastle United	Manchester
				Stadium: Old Trafford; Attendance: 55,236

11 May 1997	Newcastle United	5–0	Nottingham Forest	Newcastle upon Tyne
15:00	Asprilla 20'; Ferdinand 23', 26'; Shearer 36'; Elliott 77'			Stadium: St James' Park; Attendance: 36,554

=== UEFA Cup ===
10 September 1996 R1 1st leg	Newcastle United	4–0	Halmstad	Newcastle upon Tyne
	Ferdinand 6'; Asprilla 26'; Albert 51'; Beardsley 54'	(Report)		Stadium: St James' Park; Attendance: 28,124; Referee: Knud Erik Fisker (Denmark)

24 September 1996 R1 2nd leg	Halmstad	2–1 (2–5 agg.)	Newcastle United	Halmstad
	Arvidsson 74'; Svensson 81'	(Report)	Ferdinand 45'	Stadium: Örjans Vall; Attendance: 7,847; Referee: Sándor Piller (Hungary)

15 October 1996 R2 1st leg	Ferencváros	3–2	Newcastle United	Budapest
	Horváth 7'; Lisztes 17', 57'	(Report)	Ferdinand 25'; Shearer 35'	Stadium: Üllői úti stadion Attendance: 18,000; Referee: Leif Sundell (Sweden)

29 October 1996 R2 2nd leg	Newcastle United	4–0 (6–3 agg.)	Ferencváros	Newcastle upon Tyne
	Asprilla 42', 58'; Ginola 68'; Ferdinand 90'	(Report)		Stadium: St James' Park; Attendance: 35,740; Referee: Sergei Khusainov (Russia)

19 November 1996 R3 1st leg	Metz	1–1	Newcastle United	Metz
	Traoré 67'	(Report)	Beardsley 31' (pen.)	Stadium: Stade Saint-Symphorien; Attendance: 16,700; Referee: Günter Benkö (Austria)

3 December 1996 R3 2nd leg	Newcastle United	2–0 (3–1 agg.)	Metz	Newcastle upon Tyne
	Asprilla 80', 82'	(Report)		Stadium: St James' Park; Attendance: 35,641; Referee: Serge Muhmenthaler (Switzerland)

4 March 1997 Quarter-final 1st leg	Newcastle United	0–1	AS Monaco	Newcastle upon Tyne
		(Report)	Anderson 59'	Stadium: St James' Park; Attendance: 35,641; Referee: Piero Ceccarini (Italy)

18 March 1997 Quarter-final 2nd leg	AS Monaco	3–0 (4–0 agg.)	Newcastle United	Monaco
	Legwinski 42'; Benarbia 50', 67'	(Report)		Stadium: Stade Louis II; Attendance: 18,500; Referee: Manuel Díaz Vega (Spain)

=== FA Cup ===
5 January 1997 Round 3	Charlton Athletic	1–1	Newcastle United	London
	Kinsella 78'		Lee 33'	Stadium: The Valley; Attendance: 14,980

15 January 1997 Round 3r	Newcastle United	2–1 (a.e.t.)	Charlton Athletic	Newcastle upon Tyne
	Clark 33'; Shearer 100'		Robson 55'	Stadium: St James' Park; Attendance: 36,398

26 January 1997 Round 4	Newcastle United	1 – 2	Nottingham Forest	Newcastle upon Tyne
	Ferdinand 60'		Woan 76', 80'	Stadium: St James' Park; Attendance: 36,434

=== Football League Cup ===
23 October 1996 Round 3	Newcastle United	1–0	Oldham Athletic	Newcastle upon Tyne
	Beardsley 25' (pen.)			Stadium: St James' Park; Attendance: 36,314

27 November 1996 Round 4	Middlesbrough	3–1	Newcastle United	Middlesbrough
	Whyte 26'; Beck 61'; Ravanelli 89'		Shearer 45'	Stadium: Riverside Stadium; Attendance: 29,831
