= Richard Edghill =

English footballer (born 1974)

Personal information
- Full name: Richard Arlon Edghill
- Date of birth: 23 September 1974 (age 52)
- Place of birth: Oldham, England
- Position: Right back

Youth career
- 1988–1993: Manchester City

Senior career*
Years	Team	Apps	(Gls)
1993–2002	Manchester City	183	(1)
2000	→ Birmingham City (loan)	3	(0)
2002	Wigan Athletic	0	(0)
2003	Sheffield United	1	(0)
2003–2005	Queens Park Rangers	40	(0)
2005–2007	Bradford City	42	(1)
2007–2008	Macclesfield Town	16	(0)
Total		285	(2)

International career
1994	England B	1	(0)
1994	England U21	3	(0)
- * Club domestic league appearances and goals as of 7 May 2009

Richard Arlon Edghill (born 23 September 1974) is an English football coach and former professional footballer.

He played as a defender from 1993 to 2008, spending the majority of his career with his home town club, Manchester City. He spent numerous seasons in the Premier League and remained with the club through several relegations, followed by several promotions. He also appeared for Birmingham City in a loan spell and after leaving City in 2002 he moved on to Wigan Athletic. Spells with Sheffield United, Queens Park Rangers and Bradford City followed before ending his career with Macclesfield Town. He was capped by both England U21 and England B.

Following retirement he returned to City as a youth team coach and later became a tour guide at the City of Manchester Stadium.

== Club career ==
=== Manchester City ===
Edghill started his career with Manchester City as a product of the youth scheme which he joined as a schoolboy in 1988. His first team debut came in the 1993–94 season in a match against Wimbledon. Edghill was capped by England at under-21 and 'B' level, but his development was hampered by a series of serious injuries, including missing the entire 1996–97 season due to a knee injury. After recovery from this injury Edghill featured regularly in the first team for the next three seasons and also scored in the penalty shootout of the play-off final despite, at this point, never having scored in his professional career. In the 1999–2000 season an injury to team captain Andy Morrison saw Edghill take over as captain and he helped earn City promotion back into the Premiership. The 1999–2000 season also saw Edghill score his first professional goal in a 2–0 win against Blackburn Rovers. By then City's longest serving player, Edghill suffered a poor start to the 2000–01 season including a calamitous own goal in a 2–1 defeat against Coventry City where he was substituted at half-time. His team-mate Nicky Weaver criticized the crowd's treatment of Edghill, who had been withdrawn by manager Joe Royle to spare him further embarrassment. Edghill lost his first team place and the captaincy, and he was loaned to Birmingham City for a month.

Royle purchased both Richard Dunne and Laurent Charvet to replace Edghill. However Manchester City were going through a bad run of form and on 1 January 2001 Edghill returned to the starting line up along with Andy Morrison. However Royle was unsure of his best team hence the choice of personnel was often erratic. After falling out of the first team picture again he was transfer-listed on 8 February 2001. Manchester City were relegated and Kevin Keegan became manager. Keegan used a 3–5–2 formation with wing backs and Shaun Wright-Phillips was preferred to Edghill at right wing back. Keegan's acquisition of Sun Jihai served to further limit Edghill's opportunities at the club and he was released at the end of the 2001–02 promotion winning campaign, having made a total of 207 appearances for the club in nine years.

=== Later career ===
Following his release Edghill had short unsuccessful spells with Wigan Athletic and Sheffield United before joining Queens Park Rangers in August 2003. In the 2005 close season Edghill joined Bradford City on a free transfer. At Bradford he scored twice; against Tranmere Rovers in the league and Barnsley in the FA Cup. He was one of ten players released by Bradford in May 2007 following the club's relegation from League One.

Edghill joined Macclesfield Town on 13 July 2007, re-uniting with former City teammate Ian Brightwell, manager of the League Two side. He stayed until the end of the season before being released by manager Keith Alexander.

== International career ==
He was capped by both England U21 and England B. He was also called up to Terry Venables' get-together England squad in April 1995, but ultimately was never capped for the senior side.

== Coaching career ==
Edghill has helped out as a coach at former club Manchester City's soccer school. He has since worked as a tour guide at the City of Manchester Stadium as part of the "Legends Guides".

== Personal life ==
His autobiography, Once a Blue, Always a Blue, was published in 2014.

== Honours ==
Manchester City

- Football League Second Division play-offs: 1999
