= Spencer Prior =

English footballer (born 1971)

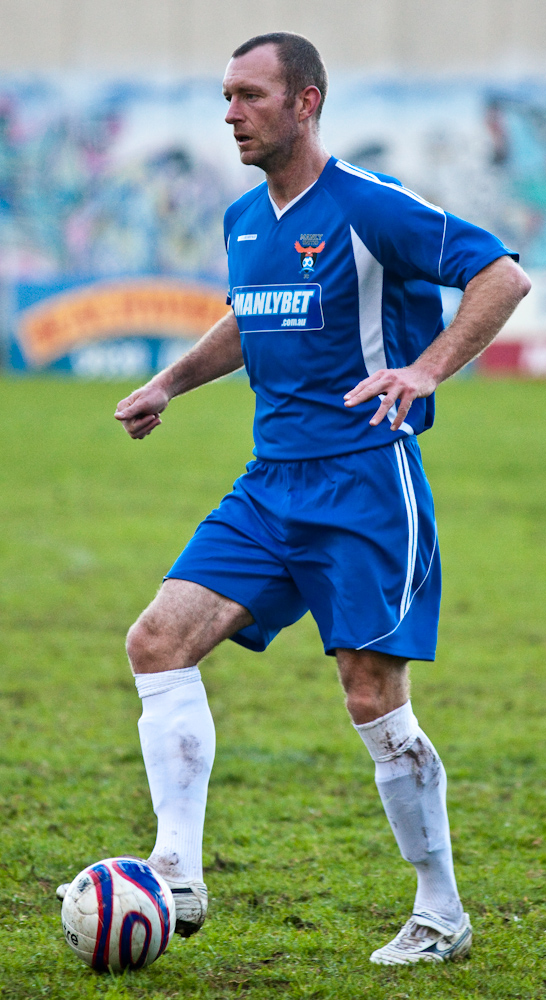
- Prior playing for Manly United in 2009

Personal information
- Full name: Spencer Justin Prior
- Date of birth: 22 April 1971 (age 55)
- Place of birth: Southend, England
- Height: 6 ft 3 in (1.91 m)
- Position: Central defender

Team information
- Current team: Papua New Guinea (manager)

Senior career*
Years	Team	Apps	(Gls)
1989–1993	Southend United	135	(3)
1993–1996	Norwich City	74	(1)
1996–1998	Leicester City	64	(0)
1998–2000	Derby County	54	(1)
2000–2001	Manchester City	30	(4)
2001–2004	Cardiff City	81	(2)
2004–2007	Southend United	75	(2)
2008–2009	Newcastle Jets	0	(0)
2009	Manly United		
Total		513	(13)

Managerial career
- 2011–2013: Australia (assistant manager)
- 2012–2013: Australia U-20
- 2013–2015: Tasmania (technical director)
- 2016–2017: Thailand
- 2019–2020: Port FC (technical director)
- 2020–2023: APIA Leichhardt
- 2022–2023: Papua New Guinea
- 2024–: New South Wales U-16
- * Club domestic league appearances and goals

Spencer Justin Prior (born 22 April 1971) is an English football coach and former professional footballer. He was most recently manager of Papua New Guinea women's national football team.

As a player, he was a central defender who notably played in the Premier League for Norwich City, Leicester City, Derby County and Manchester City. He also played in the Football League for Southend United and Cardiff City, before finishing his career in Australia with Newcastle Jets and Manly United.

Since retiring, he has moved into coaching largely in women's football. He has worked as assistant coach for Australia women, before later managing the Australia U20 women and Thailand women. He has also had spells as technical director of both Tasmania and Port FC.

== Playing career ==
Prior made 135 league appearances in his first spell with Southend. His solid performances in the centre of the Shrimpers defence attracted the attention of other clubs and in the summer of 1993 both Norwich and Wolverhampton Wanderers made moves to sign him. He opted for Norwich because they had qualified to play in Europe for the 1993–94 season and they paid Southend a fee of £300,000 for his services. In his first season at Carrow Road he played in the historic 2–1 win at Bayern Munich and the 1–0 defeat at Inter Milan that saw City eliminated from the UEFA Cup.

During his first two seasons with Norwich, Prior found it difficult to establish himself as a first team regular. After the club had been relegated from the Premiership in 1995, however, Prior became a regular selection under the management firstly of Martin O'Neill and then Gary Megson. It was a difficult season for Norwich which was played out against weekly demonstrations at chairman Robert Chase. Prior ended the season by being voted Norwich City player of the year. In August 1996, Leicester paid £600,000 for him. He had played 89 games for Norwich.

In his first season at Leicester, Prior got a League Cup winner's medal as the Foxes beat Middlesbrough in a replayed final. Prior moved to Derby in 1998 but did not settle there, though did manage to score the winner in a game against Sheffield Wednesday. A number of clubs showed an interest in him before Manchester City signed him shortly before the transfer deadline in the 1999–2000 season. City had signed him to replace the injured Andy Morrison as they had only been able to field two central defenders (Gerard Wiekens and Richard Jobson) for most of the season. His impact on the team was immediate, his goals earning City numerous victories and ultimately promotion. As City arrived in the Premiership Prior found his first team opportunities limited as the then City manager, Joe Royle, bought Steve Howey, Richard Dunne and Paul Ritchie, while Andy Morrison also returned from his lengthy injury.

Thus, Prior moved to Cardiff City for a £700,000 fee. His three-year stint at Ninian Park saw him make 81 league appearances, scoring two goals.

Prior was released by Cardiff and returned to the club where he began his career, Southend United, in July 2004. In his first two seasons back at Roots Hall, the team won consecutive promotions.

== Coaching career ==
After retiring from football, Prior moved to Australia and became a football analyst for Fox Sports Australia. He also coached a number of teams at Sydney Grammar School and was the head coach at Mosman Football Club in 2007 and 2008, leading a significant improvement in its coaching capabilities.

In December 2008, A-League club Newcastle Jets announced they had signed the 37-year-old Prior for the remainder of the 2008–09 season.

On 1 January 2011, he was confirmed as assistant head coach of the Matildas, assistant to Tom Sermanni.

In 2016, he signed a two-year contract with the Thailand women's national team and was hailed for bringing through major changes in the team's tactical awareness and competitiveness.

In July 2019, he joined Thai League 1 club Port F.C. as Technical Director. After Prior's arrival, Port won five of their next six matches and won the 2019 Thai FA Cup, defeating Ratchaburi Mitr Phol 1–0 in the final.

Prior returned to Australia due to the COVID-19 pandemic and commenced coaching duties with NSW NPL club APIA Leichhardt FC's women's team in September 2020.

After winning the 2022 OFC Women's Nations Cup, Prior was asked by the Oceania Football Confederation to take charge of Papua New Guinea's women's team in their effort to qualify for the 2023 FIFA Women's World Cup. Despite reaching the 2023 FIFA Women's World Cup qualification (inter-confederation play-offs), PNG were defeated 2-0 by a Panama, who would qualify for the tournament proper.

In 2024, Prior was appointed Head Coach of the NSW Under-16 Boys team and would go on to guide the 'Metro Sky Blue' group to becoming National Youth Champions in July 2024, with former Socceroo Brett Emerton as his assistant.

In November 2024, Prior's daughter, Natasha Prior received her first senior call up to the Australian national team.

== Honours ==
Leicester City

- Football League Cup: 1996–97

Cardiff City

- Football League Second Division play-offs: 2003
- FAW Premier Cup: 2001–02

Southend United

- Football League One: 2005–06
- Football League Two play-offs: 2005
- Football League Trophy runner-up: 2004–05
