= Nicky Weaver =

English footballer

Personal information
- Full name: Nicholas James Weaver
- Date of birth: 2 March 1979 (age 47)
- Place of birth: Sheffield, England
- Height: 1.93 m (6 ft 4 in)
- Position: Goalkeeper

Youth career
- –1995: Sheffield Wednesday

Senior career*
Years	Team	Apps	(Gls)
1995–1997	Mansfield Town	1	(0)
1997–2007	Manchester City	172	(0)
2005–2006	→ Sheffield Wednesday (loan)	14	(0)
2007–2009	Charlton Athletic	67	(0)
2009–2010	Dundee United	18	(0)
2010	Burnley	0	(0)
2010–2013	Sheffield Wednesday	44	(0)
2013–2014	Aberdeen	2	(0)
Total		318	(0)

International career
1996–1997	England U18	3	(0)
1999–2002	England U21	10	(0)
- * Club domestic league appearances and goals

Nicholas James Weaver (born 2 March 1979) is an English football coach and former professional player.

A goalkeeper, he began his career in 1995 with Mansfield Town, before joining Manchester City in 1997. He would go on to be a part of the club that earned promotion from the Second Division in 1999 in which he saved the decisive penalty in the play-off final shootout with Gillingham at Wembley Stadium. He would go on to earn promotion to the Premier League the following season and in total was promoted three times with City in a ten-year spell. By the time he left the club in 2007 he had been the club's second choice keeper for a number of years and had acted as understudy to the likes of Peter Schmeichel, David Seaman and David James. He went on to appear for Charlton Athletic, Dundee United, Burnley, Sheffield Wednesday and Aberdeen. He is a former England under-21 international.

He worked for Sheffield Wednesday since retiring and has held a number of different roles including academy and first team goalkeeper coach.

== Playing career ==
=== Manchester City ===
Weaver was bought by Manchester City from Mansfield Town on the recommendation of goalkeeping coach Alex Stepney. He made his competitive Manchester City debut in the first match of the 1998–99 season against Blackpool, keeping a clean sheet. Over the course of the season Weaver kept a total of 26 clean sheets, breaking the club record for clean sheets in a season. Weaver was the hero for Manchester City in the 1999 Second Division Play-off final versus Gillingham after his penalty save clinched promotion, prompting him to go on a 'crazy run' around the Wembley pitch. Around this time, Weaver was tipped to receive full international honours for England by Jon McGinty after becoming an England under 21 international.

Weaver remained first choice goalkeeper in 1999–2000, as City secured a second consecutive promotion by finishing in second place in the First Division. He then tasted Premier League football for the first time in the 2000–01 season, as the club was relegated in its first top flight campaign since 1996. Weaver missed almost half of City's league matches in 2001–02 through injury, as the club was again promoted back to the Premier League. Weaver's growing injury problems lead to Keegan signing veteran Peter Schmeichel for the 2002–03 season, with Weaver dropping to second choice.

Weaver did not start any games in the 2002–03, 2003–04 and 2004–05 seasons. However, he did play the last fifteen minutes of the 2004–05 season, when Stuart Pearce surprisingly substituted Claudio Reyna for Weaver so the regular City goalkeeper David James could play in attack against Middlesbrough.

Weaver's return to fitness resulted in injury once again during the close season of 2005, ruling him out of the start of the season. In Autumn 2005 Weaver went on loan to Sheffield Wednesday, the team he had supported since childhood and for whom he had played as a schoolboy, in an attempt to return to full fitness.

While at Wednesday, Weaver made 14 appearances, beginning with a 2–1 victory at home to Derby County and ending with a 3–0 defeat away at Leeds United. He also played in the Steel City derby away at Bramall Lane against Sheffield United, where Wednesday were beaten 1–0. He was the only Sheffield born player in the entire fixture.

Before the 2006–07 season, Manchester City sold James to Portsmouth, bought Andreas Isaksson as a replacement and gave Isaksson the number 1 shirt. However, an injury to Isaksson meant Weaver played the first game of the season on 20 August 2006, his first senior start for the club in nearly three years and Weaver's improved form led to him starting all but one of the Manchester City games in the rest of 2006.

=== Charlton Athletic and Dundee United ===
On 4 July 2007, out-of-contract Weaver signed for Charlton Athletic on a free transfer. On 5 April 2008, Weaver was sent off after three minutes for handball in a match against Plymouth Argyle. The incident marked the quickest ever dismissal of a Charlton player, a record that would remain until 2018. Following his release from Charlton, Weaver signed for Dundee United on 5 August 2009 on a short-term contract. The United fans took to him instantly and – although he was pelted by snowballs by Aberdeen fans in his final home match at Tannadice as the ground staff thought it was a good idea not to clear all the snow – he played in every league match before his contract expired in January 2010.

=== Burnley ===
On 27 January 2010, Weaver signed an initial six-month contract with Burnley on a free transfer subject to international clearance. However, he was released on 11 May 2010 without making a single appearance.

=== Sheffield Wednesday ===
With Lee Grant's departure from Sheffield Wednesday to Burnley in the close season, Weaver the ex-Owl loanee and Wednesday fan signed as a replacement after the club's transfer embargo was lifted. On 4 October 2010, Weaver was awarded the Handley Brown player of the month for September after a number of impressive performances in an underachieving Wednesday team. Weaver was awarded man of the match against Chesterfield in a Football League Trophy second round match after scoring the decisive penalty and saving three spot kicks, two of which were vital sudden death saves to keep Wednesday in the competition.

Weaver received his second successive Player of The Month award off the club for his performances in October. His consistent performances led to him signing a new two-and-a-half-year deal on 14 February 2011, which due to an oversight by the press office was not announced until 4 April. Weaver fell out of favour at Sheffield Wednesday following the signing of Chris Kirkland, with Kirkland inheriting Weaver's no.1 shirt. After failing to appear in any matchday squad since Kirkland's arrival, he was released at the end of the season.

=== Aberdeen ===
On 15 July 2013, Weaver signed for Aberdeen on a six-month contract. This was extended for a further six months in January 2014.

== Coaching career ==
In September 2014, Weaver returned to Sheffield Wednesday as academy goalkeeping coach. He replaced Andy Rhodes as first team goalkeeping coach in July 2018. On 14 August 2020, it was confirmed as part of a coaching staff restructure, Weaver would switch roles and become Head of Academy Goalkeeping, the position he originally had when joining the club as staff. On 11 April 2024, Weaver confirmed he would be leaving Sheffield Wednesday at the end of the 2023–24 season, saying "I don't see myself coaching again but you never say never".

== Career statistics ==
Appearances and goals by club, season and competition
Club	Season	League			National cup		League cup		Europe		Other		Total	
Club	Season	Division	Apps	Goals	Apps	Goals	Apps	Goals	Apps	Goals	Apps	Goals	Apps	Goals
Mansfield Town	1995–96	Third Division	1	0	0	0	0	0	—		0	0	1	0
Mansfield Town	1996–97	Third Division	0	0	0	0	0	0	—		0	0	0	0
Mansfield Town	Total		1	0	0	0	0	0	0	0	0	0	1	0
Manchester City	1998–99	Second Division	45	0	4	0	3	0	—		3 (Note: Appearances in Second Division play-offs)	0	55	0
Manchester City	1999–2000	First Division	45	0	2	0	4	0	—		–		51	0
Manchester City	2000–01	Premier League	31	0	3	0	5	0	—		–		39	0
Manchester City	2001–02	First Division	25	0	2	0	2	0	—		–		29	0
Manchester City	2002–03	Premier League	0	0	0	0	0	0	—		–		0	0
Manchester City	2003–04	Premier League	0	0	0	0	0	0	1 (Note: Appearance in UEFA Cup)	0	–		1	0
Manchester City	2004–05	Premier League	1	0	0	0	0	0	—		–		1	0
Manchester City	2005–06	Premier League	1	0	0	0	0	0	—		–		1	0
Manchester City	2006–07	Premier League	25	0	5	0	1	0	—		–		31	0
Manchester City	Total		172	0	16	0	15	0	1	0	3	0	207	0
Sheffield Wednesday (loan)	2005–06	Championship	14	0	0	0	–		—		–		14	0
Charlton Athletic	2007–08	Championship	45	0	2	0	1	0	—		–		48	0
Charlton Athletic	2008–09	Championship	22	0	0	0	0	0	—		–		22	0
Charlton Athletic	Total		67	0	2	0	1	0	0	0	0	0	70	0
Dundee United	2009–10	Scottish Premier League	18	0	–		0	0	—		–		18	0
Burnley	2009–10	Premier League	0	0	–		–		—		–		0	0
Sheffield Wednesday	2010–11	League One	36	0	5	0	2	0	—		4 (Note: Appearances in Football League Trophy)	0	47	0
Sheffield Wednesday	2011–12	League One	8	0	1	0	0	0	—		1	0	10	0
Sheffield Wednesday	Total		44	0	6	0	2	0	0	0	5	0	57	0
Aberdeen	2013–14	Scottish Premiership	2	0	0	0	0	0	—		–		2	0
Career total			318	0	24	0	18	0	1	0	8	0	359	0

== Honours ==
Manchester City

- Football League First Division: 2001–02
- Football League First Division second-place promotion: 1999–2000
- Football League Second Division play-offs: 1999

Sheffield Wednesday

- Football League One second-place promotion: 2011–12

Aberdeen

- Scottish League Cup: 2013–14
