= Steve Howey (footballer) =

English footballer and manager

Personal information
- Full name: Steven Norman Howey
- Date of birth: 26 October 1971 (age 55)
- Place of birth: Sunderland, England
- Height: 6 ft 1 in (1.85 m)
- Position: Centre-back

Senior career*
Years	Team	Apps	(Gls)
1989–2000	Newcastle United	191	(6)
2000–2003	Manchester City	94	(11)
2003–2004	Leicester City	13	(1)
2004	Bolton Wanderers	3	(0)
2004	New England Revolution	3	(0)
2005	Hartlepool United	1	(0)
2010	Bishop Auckland		
Total		305	(18)

International career
1994–1996	England	4	(0)

Managerial career
- 2006: Crook Town
- * Club domestic league appearances and goals

Steven Norman Howey (born 26 October 1971) is an English football coach, former professional footballer and sports radio presenter.

As a player, he was a centre-back who notably played in the Premier League for Newcastle United, Manchester City, Leicester City and Bolton Wanderers, before winding up his career with brief stints in Major League Soccer with New England Revolution and in The Football League with Hartlepool United. He was capped four times by England and was part of the squad for Euro 96.

Following the end of his playing days, Howey had a brief spell as manager of non-league side Crook Town before coming out of retirement to play for Bishop Auckland whilst serving as a coach. He has since worked as a sports radio presenter for Total Sport and BBC Radio Newcastle.

== Club career ==
=== Newcastle United ===
Howey started his career with Newcastle United signing a professional contract on 11 December 1989. At first he was playing in the striker position for the youth and reserve teams until Ossie Ardiles conceived the idea of moving him from the attack back into the defence. Howey was an important part of Kevin Keegan's First Division championship winning side in 1992–93, winning promotion to the Premier League. Once promoted, Howey continued to be a first-choice centre back but was often missing through injury. During Howey's time at Newcastle they were Premier League runner-up twice, in 1995–96 and 1996–97, in addition to FA Cup runner-up in 1997–98 and 1998–99. Howey is still a very popular figure in Newcastle as part of a successful influx from Newcastle's youth academy which also included Steve Watson, Robbie Elliott and Lee Clark.

=== Manchester City ===
In August 2000 newly-promoted Manchester City paid Newcastle £2,000,000 for him. His debut came in a 4–0 defeat to Charlton Athletic setting the tone for a disappointing season which saw Man City relegated. Howey remained at Man City the following season as part of the team which secured an immediate return to the Premier League as First Division champions. One last season at Man City saw Howey contribute to a top half finish and comfortable survival. In his three seasons with Man City Howey scored 11 goals. A highlight of his time at Manchester City was scoring a late equaliser against rivals Manchester United at Old Trafford, in a game more remembered for the clash between Roy Keane and Alf-Inge Haaland.

=== Later career ===
In June 2003, Howey joined newly-promoted Premier League team Leicester City for an undisclosed fee. After making 13 appearances for the Foxes, he moved to Bolton Wanderers on 28 January 2004. Having made only three appearances for the club from the Reebok Stadium, he was released.

On 26 August 2004, Howey signed with Steve Nicol's New England Revolution in Major League Soccer as a "Senior International." He made his debut in a 0-0 draw against D.C. United two days later. He started the next two consecutive matches for the Revolution but would make no further appearances for the club. He was waived on 26 November.

In March 2005, Howey signed with League One side Hartlepool United on a short-term contract, where a final appearance (on 9 April 2005 against Colchester United) brought down the curtain on his sixteen-year professional career.

== International career ==
Howey earned four caps for England, starting all four matches. He made his debut in the 1–0 win against Nigeria at Wembley Stadium in November 1994. He won caps in the draws with Colombia and Portugal in 1995 before making his final appearance in the 1–0 victory over Bulgaria in March 1996. Howey was called up to the England squad for Euro 96, and was an unused substitute in the first match against Switzerland, but was not fit enough to be on the team sheet for the remaining four matches. He was never called up to the full squad again.

== Managerial career ==
Howey had a short, unsuccessful spell as manager of Crook Town, taking the helm in September 2006 and resigning just two months later after a poor run of results. He followed this with a spell as a youth team coach at Middlesbrough before making a playing return with National League side Bishop Auckland who he also served in a coaching capacity. Howey become a coach at East Durham College Football Development Centre in 2007 and become head coach in 2010.

== Media career ==
Howey has worked as a presenter for Total Sport and BBC Radio Newcastle.

In 2019 and 2020, Howey featured in both seasons of ITV show Harry's Heroes, which featured former football manager Harry Redknapp attempting get a squad of former England international footballers back fit and healthy for a game against Germany legends.

== Personal life ==
Howey co-presented Total Sport on BBC Newcastle with Marco Gabbiadini and Simon Pryde. His older brother Lee was also a footballer, principally with Newcastle's rivals Sunderland.

In December 2024, 53-year-old Howey made public that medical tests had proven that his brain was in cognitive decline, which he attributed to heading footballs. He was one of four Premier League-era footballers who took legal action over sporting authorities, along with the family of deceased former player and manager Joe Kinnear.

== Career statistics ==
=== Club ===
Club	Season	League			FA Cup		League Cup		Other		Total	
Club	Season	Division	Apps	Goals	Apps	Goals	Apps	Goals	Apps	Goals	Apps	Goals
Newcastle United	1988–89	First Division	1	0	0	0	0	0	-		1	0
Newcastle United	1989–90	Second Division	0	0	0	0	0	0	-		0	0
Newcastle United	1990–91	Second Division	11	0	0	0	0	0	-		11	0
Newcastle United	1991–92	Second Division	21	1	2	0	3	1	-		26	2
Newcastle United	1992–93	First Division	41	2	3	0	5	0	4 [a]	0	53	2
Newcastle United	1993–94	Premier League	14	0	3	0	0	0	-		17	0
Newcastle United	1994–95	Premier League	30	1	4	0	4	0	3 [b]	0	41	1
Newcastle United	1995–96	Premier League	28	1	1	0	4	0	-		33	1
Newcastle United	1996–97	Premier League	8	1	0	0	0	0	1 [b]	0	9	1
Newcastle United	1997–98	Premier League	14	0	5	0	1	0	3 [c]	0	23	0
Newcastle United	1998–99	Premier League	14	0	4	0	0	0	0 [d]	0	18	0
Newcastle United	1999–2000	Premier League	9	0	1	0	0	0	0 [e]	0	10	0
Newcastle United	Total		191	6	23	0	17	1	11	0	242	7
Manchester City	2000–01	Premier League	36	6	1	0	2	0	-		39	6
Manchester City	2001–02	First Division	34	3	2	0	2	0	-		38	3
Manchester City	2002–03	Premier League	24	2	0	0	2	0	-		26	2
Manchester City	Total		94	11	3	0	6	0	-		103	11
Leicester City	2003–04	Premier League	13	1	0	0	2	0	-		15	1
Bolton Wanderers (loan)	2003–04	Premier League	3	0	0	0	0	0	-		3	0
New England Revolution	2004	Major League Soccer	3	0	0	0	-		0	0	3	0
Hartlepool United	2004–05	League One	1	0	0	0	0	0	0 [e]	0	1	0
Career total			305	18	26	0	25	1	11	0	367	19

[a] Anglo-Italian Cup

[b] UEFA Cup

[c] UEFA Champions League

[d] UEFA Cup Winners' Cup

[e] Football League Trophy

== Honours ==
Newcastle United

- Football League First Division: 1992–93
- FA Cup runner-up: 1997–98

Manchester City

- Football League First Division: 2001–02
