= 1998–99 Colchester United F.C. season =

Colchester United
1998–99 season
- Chairman: Peter Heard
- Manager: Steve Wignall (until 21 January); Steve Whitton (caretaker) (21 January until 28 January); Mick Wadsworth (from 28 January)
- Stadium: Layer Road
- Second Division: 18th
- FA Cup: 1st round (eliminated by Bedlington Terriers)
- League Cup: 1st round (eliminated by AFC Bournemouth)
- Football League Trophy: 1st round (southern section) (eliminated by Gillingham)
- Top goalscorer: League: David Gregory (11); All: David Gregory (14)
- Highest home attendance: 6,554 v Manchester City, 20 March 1999
- Lowest home attendance: 1,742 v Gillingham, 5 December 1998
- Average home league attendance: 4,303
- Biggest win: 4–2 v Wrexham, 15 August 1998; 3–1 v Notts County, 21 November 1998
- Biggest defeat: 0–4 v Burnley, 9 October 1998; 1–5 v Gillingham, 5 December 1998
Home colours

The 1998–99 season was Colchester United's 57th season in their history and their first season back in the third tier of English football, the Second Division, following promotion via the play-offs in the previous season. Alongside competing in the Second Division, the club also participated in the FA Cup, the League Cup and the Football League Trophy.

After a reasonable start to the season, manager Steve Wignall quit in January expressing that he had taken the club as far as he could. Mick Wadsworth was appointed his replacement and duly brought in a number of new players on permanent and loan contracts. Colchester finished the season in 18th position, two points clear of the relegation zone.

The U's were ignominiously dumped out of the FA Cup in the first round by non-League outfit Bedlington Terriers. They also suffered first round exits in the League Cup and Football League Trophy to AFC Bournemouth and Gillingham respectively.

== Season overview ==
Following promotion from the Third Division, Steve Wignall had a huge task ahead of him to keep Colchester in the division. The league boasted Manchester City and Stoke City amongst its ranks, as well as Kevin Keegan's Fulham during Mohamed Al-Fayed's ownership during their rise to the Premier League.

Wignall's side had a reasonable start to the campaign, but were dumped out of the League Cup and Football League Trophy at the first round stages. The U's then faced a trip to non-League side Bedlington Terriers in the FA Cup first round. Bedlington held a 2–0 lead after 23 minutes and eventually held a 4–0 lead after 86 minutes, before Tony Adcock scored a late consolation goal. Following this, Colchester one just one game in their next nine matches.

In January 1999, seven days after handing raw forward Lomana LuaLua his debut, Wignall quit the club, citing that he had taken the team as far as he could and left frustrated at the role agents were playing in deals he had been trying to set up. Assistant manager Steve Whitton stepped up as caretaker manager before Mick Wadsworth was named the new manager of Colchester United. He kept Whitton on as assistant and brought in a number of new players.

The club survived relegation by two points, ending the campaign in 18th place. Crowds had risen to an average of 4,479, but swingeing cuts were made to the playing staff at the end of the season.

== Players ==
As of match played 8 May 1999.

Name	Position	Nationality	Place of birth	Date of birth	Apps	Goals	Signed from	Date signed	Fee
Goalkeepers
Carl Emberson	GK	(England)	Epsom	13 July 1973 (aged 24)	185	0	(England) Millwall	6 July 1994	£25,000
Tamer Fernandes	GK	(England)	Paddington	7 December 1974 (aged 23)	0	0	(England) Peterborough United	28 January 1998	Free transfer
Andy Walker	GK	(England)	Bexleyheath	30 September 1981 (aged 16)	0	0	Youth team	1 August 1998	Free transfer
Defenders
Simon Betts	FB	(England)	Middlesbrough	3 March 1973 (aged 25)	195	11	(England) Scarborough	11 December 1992	Free transfer
Joe Dunne	FB	(Republic of Ireland)	Dublin	25 May 1973 (aged 25)	80	4	(England) Gillingham	27 March 1996	Free transfer
David Greene	CB	(Republic of Ireland)	(England) Luton	26 October 1973 (aged 24)	118	9	(England) Luton Town	21 June 1996	£30,000
Nicky Haydon	DF/MF	(England)	Barking	10 August 1978 (aged 19)	21	1	Youth team	1 August 1995	Free transfer
Sean Hillier	DF	(England)	Clacton-on-Sea	11 September 1981 (aged 16)	0	0	Youth team	1 August 1998	Free transfer
Stéphane Pounewatchy	CB	(France)	Paris	10 February 1968 (aged 30)	0	0	(England) Port Vale	18 February 1999	Monthly contract
Fabrice Richard	FB	(France)	Saintes	16 August 1973 (aged 24)	0	0	(England) AS Cannes	18 March 1999	Free transfer
Scott Stamps	FB	(England)	Edgbaston	20 March 1975 (aged 23)	40	1	(England) Torquay United	26 March 1997	£15,000
Midfielders
Warren Aspinall	MF	(England)	Wigan	13 September 1967 (aged 30)	6	0	(England) Brentford	25 March 1999	Undisclosed
Paul Buckle	MF	(England)	Hatfield	16 December 1970 (aged 27)	74	8	(England) Wycombe Wanderers	28 November 1996	Free transfer
Jason Dozzell	MF	(England)	Ipswich	9 December 1967 (aged 30)	0	0	(England) Northampton Town	15 October 1998	Non-contract
Karl Duguid	MF	(England)	Letchworth	21 March 1978 (aged 20)	70	7	Youth team	9 December 1995 (Note: Date of signing refers to the date of the player's first game for the club)	Free transfer
Steve Forbes	MF	(England)	Stoke Newington	24 December 1975 (aged 22)	44	3	(England) Millwall	14 March 1997	Free transfer
David Gregory	MF	(England)	Sudbury	23 January 1970 (aged 28)	112	11	(England) Peterborough United	8 December 1995	Free transfer
Sam Okafor	MF	(Nigeria)	Xtiam	17 March 1982 (aged 16)	0	0	Youth team	1 August 1998	Free transfer
Dave Rainford	MF	(England)	Stepney	21 April 1979 (aged 19)	0	0	Youth team	July 1997	Free transfer
Aaron Skelton	MF/DF	(England)	Welwyn Garden City	22 November 1974 (aged 23)	48	7	(England) Luton Town	3 July 1997	Free transfer
Richard Wilkins	MF/DF	(England)	Lambeth	28 May 1965 (aged 33)	273	39	(England) Hereford United	3 July 1996	£17,500
Geraint Williams	MF	(Wales)	Treorchy	5 January 1962 (aged 36)	0	0	(England) Ipswich Town	6 July 1998	Free transfer
Forwards
Paul Abrahams	FW/WG	(England)	Colchester	31 October 1973 (aged 24)	149	31	(England) Brentford	23 October 1996	£20,000
Tony Adcock	FW	(England)	Bethnal Green	27 March 1963 (aged 35)	346	148	(England) Luton Town	3 August 1995	Free transfer
Neil Gregory	FW	(England)	(Zambia) Ndola	7 October 1972 (aged 25)	18	7	(England) Ipswich Town	26 March 1998	£50,000
Tony Lock	FW	(England)	Harlow	3 September 1976 (aged 21)	51	8	Apprentice	28 January 1995	Free transfer
Lomana LuaLua	FW	(Democratic Republic of the Congo)	(Zaire) Kinshasa	28 December 1980 (aged 17)	0	0	Leyton Sixth Form College	1 September 1998	Non-contract
KK Opara	FW	(Nigeria)	Owerri	21 December 1981 (aged 16)	0	0	Youth team	1 September 1998	Free transfer
Mark Sale	FW	(England)	Burton upon Trent	27 February 1972 (aged 26)	61	11	(England) Mansfield Town	10 March 1997	£23,500

== Transfers ==
=== In ===
Date	Position	Nationality	Name	From	Fee	Ref.
6 July 1998	MF	(Wales)	Geraint Williams	(England) Ipswich Town	Free transfer	
1 August 1998	DF	(England)	Sean Hillier	Youth team	Free transfer	
1 August 1998	MF	(Nigeria)	Sam Okafor	Youth team	Free transfer	
1 August 1998	FW	(Nigeria)	KK Opara	Youth team	Free transfer	
1 August 1998	GK	(England)	Andy Walker	Youth team	Free transfer	
1 August 1998	CB	(England)	Ian Wiles	Youth team	Free transfer	
1 September 1998	FW	(Democratic Republic of the Congo)	Lomana LuaLua	Leyton Sixth Form College	Non-contract	
15 October 1998	MF	(England)	Jason Dozzell	(England) Northampton Town	Non-contract	
18 February 1999	CB	(France)	Stéphane Pounewatchy	(England) Port Vale	Monthly contract	
18 March 1999	MF	(Brazil)	Fumaça	(Brazil) Catuense	Undisclosed	
18 March 1999	FB	(France)	Fabrice Richard	(France) AS Cannes	Free transfer	
25 March 1999	MF	(France)	Warren Aspinall	(England) Brentford	Undisclosed	

- Total spending: ▼ ~ £0

=== Out ===
Date	Position	Nationality	Name	To	Fee	Ref.
End of season	MF	(Wales)	Jeremy Goss	(England) King's Lynn	Released	
31 May 1998	CB	(England)	Peter Cawley	(England) Braintree Town	Undisclosed	
15 August 1998	CB	(England)	Ian Wiles	(England) Heybridge Swifts	Undisclosed	(Note: Date of departure refers to the date of the player's final game for the club)
24 October 1998	WG	(England)	Ian Hathaway	(England) Aldershot Town	Released	
24 March 1999	MF	(Brazil)	Fumaça	(England) Barnsley	Released	

- Total incoming: ▲ ~ £0

=== Loans in ===
Date	Position	Nationality	Name	From	End date	Ref.
3 October 1998	CB	(England)	Guy Branston	(England) Leicester City	3 October 1998	(Note: Loan start and end dates refer to the date of the player's first and final games in his second spell for the club)
9 November 1998	CB	(England)	Keith Dublin	(England) Southend United	9 December 1998	
8 February 1999	MF	(England)	Warren Aspinall	(England) Brentford	24 March 1999	
24 February 1999	FW	(England)	Bradley Allen	(England) Charlton Athletic	18 March 1999	
25 March 1999	FW	(France)	Steve Germain	(France) AS Cannes	9 May 1999	
25 March 1999	MF	(Republic of Ireland)	Brian Launders	(England) Derby County	27 March 1999	

=== Loans out ===
Date	Position	Nationality	Name	To	End date	Ref.
25 September 1998	WG	(England)	Ian Hathaway	(England) Aldershot Town	23 October 1998	
1 January 1999	MF	(England)	Dave Rainford	(England) Scarborough	24 January 1999	
March 1999	DF/MF	(England)	Nicky Haydon	(England) Kettering Town	March 1999	
5 March 1999	MF	(England)	Steve Forbes	(England) Peterborough United	5 April 1999	
25 March 1999	FW	(England)	Mark Sale	(England) Plymouth Argyle	9 May 1999	

== Match details ==
=== Second Division ===
==== Results round by round ====
Round	1	2	3	4	5	6	7	8	9	10	11	12	13	14	15	16	17	18	19	20	21	22	23	24	25	26	27	28	29	30	31	32	33	34	35	36	37	38	39	40	41	42	43	44	45	46
Ground	H	A	H	A	H	A	A	H	A	H	A	H	A	A	A	H	H	A	H	A	H	A	H	H	A	H	A	A	H	H	A	H	A	H	A	H	A	H	A	H	A	H	A	H	H	A
Result	W	W	L	L	L	W	D	D	D	W	L	L	L	D	L	D	W	W	D	D	D	L	L	D	L	L	D	D	W	W	D	D	D	D	L	L	L	W	L	W	L	W	D	W	L	L
Position	8	3	5	11	12	9	12	12	12	10	12	16	17	18	20	19	18	14	14	14	14	15	16	16	17	18	17	18	17	15	15	15	16	16	16	17	17	15	17	17	18	15	18	16	17	18

Source: 11v11.com
A = Away; H = Home; W = Win; D = Draw; L = Loss

==== League table ====
Pos	Team	Pld	W	D	L	GF	GA	GD	Pts
16	Notts County	46	14	12	20	52	61	−9	54
17	Wrexham	46	13	14	19	43	62	−19	53
18	Colchester United	46	12	16	18	52	70	−18	52
19	Wycombe Wanderers	46	13	12	21	52	58	−6	51
20	Oldham Athletic	46	14	9	23	48	66	−18	51

Rules for classification: 1) Points; 2) Goals scored; 3) Goal difference

==== Matches ====
8 August 1998 1	Colchester United	1–0	Chesterfield	Colchester
15:00 BST	Sale 90'	Report		Stadium: Layer Road; Attendance: 4,042; Referee: Paul Danson

15 August 1998 2	Wrexham	2–4	Colchester United	Wrexham
	Roberts 62'; Connolly 78' (pen.)	Report	Abrahams 16'; Haydon 43'; N. Gregory 48'; D. Gregory 64' (pen.)	Stadium: Racecourse Ground; Attendance: 4,157; Referee: E Lomas

22 August 1998 3	Colchester United	0–1	Fulham	Colchester
15:00 BST		Report	Collins 82'	Stadium: Layer Road; Attendance: 6,377; Referee: Steve Bennett

29 August 1998 4	Luton Town	2–0	Colchester United	Luton
15:00 BST	Douglas 61'; Davis 81'; Johnson (red card) 53'	Report		Stadium: Kenilworth Road; Attendance: 5,005; Referee: Roger Furnandiz

31 August 1998 5	Colchester United	0–1	Stoke City	Colchester
15:00 BST	Kavanagh 78'	Report		Stadium: Layer Road; Attendance: 4,728; Referee: Paul Taylor

5 September 1998 6	York City	1–2	Colchester United	York
15:00 BST	Thompson 76' (pen.)	Report	N. Gregory 2'; Forbes 86'	Stadium: Bootham Crescent; Attendance: 2,699; Referee: Steve Baines

8 September 1998 7	Wigan Athletic	1–1	Colchester United	Wigan
	Lee 86'	Report	Sale 62'	Stadium: Springfield Park; Attendance: 2,784; Referee: Anthony Bates

12 September 1998 8	Colchester United	1–1	Gillingham	Colchester
	N. Gregory 28'	Report	Asaba 27'	Stadium: Layer Road; Attendance: 4,612; Referee: G Frankland

19 September 1998 9	Reading	1–1	Colchester United	Reading
	Williams 17'	Report	Duguid 89'	Stadium: Madejski Stadium; Attendance: 9,058; Referee: D Pugh

26 September 1998 10	Colchester United	2–1	Wycombe Wanderers	Colchester
15:00 BST	Forbes 65'; D. Gregory 89' (pen.)	Report	Stallard 60'	Stadium: Layer Road; Attendance: 4,205; Referee: Andy D'Urso

3 October 1998 11	Oldham Athletic	1–0	Colchester United	Oldham
	Rickers 20'	Report		Stadium: Boundary Park; Attendance: 4,231; Referee: B Coddington

9 October 1998 12	Colchester United	0–4	Burnley	Colchester
19:45 BST		Report	Payton 2', 11'; Vindheim 50'; Cooke 72'	Stadium: Layer Road; Attendance: 5,532; Referee: D Crick

17 October 1998 13	Preston North End	2–0	Colchester United	Preston
	Eyres 12'; Nogan 39'	Report		Stadium: Deepdale; Attendance: 10,483; Referee: Phil Dowd

20 October 1998 14	Walsall	1–1	Colchester United	Walsall
	Platt 47'	Report	Lock 87'	Stadium: Bescot Stadium; Attendance: 3,319; Referee: Graham Laws

31 October 1998 15	Manchester City	2–1	Colchester United	Manchester
15:00 GMT	Horlock 50' (pen.); Morrison 53'	Report	Dozzell 59'	Stadium: Maine Road; Attendance: 24,820; Referee: Mike Pike

6 November 1998 16	Colchester United	1–1	Macclesfield Town	Colchester
19:45 GMT	Greene 75'	Report	Griffiths 28'	Stadium: Layer Road; Attendance: 3,927; Referee: Ray Olivier

10 November 1998 17	Colchester United	1–0	Northampton Town	Colchester
19:45 GMT	Greene 88'	Report		Stadium: Layer Road; Attendance: 3,597; Referee: Roger Furnandiz

21 November 1998 18	Notts County	1–3	Colchester United	Nottingham
15:00 GMT	Murray 52'	Report	Greene 10', 23'; D. Gregory 48'	Stadium: Meadow Lane; Attendance: 4,598; Referee: Mike Jones

28 November 1998 19	Colchester United	0–0	Millwall	Colchester
15:00 GMT		Report	Nethercott (red card) 40'	Stadium: Layer Road; Attendance: 4,476; Referee: Andy Hall

12 December 1998 20	Lincoln City	0–0	Colchester United	Lincoln
15:00 GMT		Report		Stadium: Sincil Bank; Attendance: 4,513; Referee: Alan Wiley

18 December 1998 21	Colchester United	2–2	Blackpool	Colchester
19:45 GMT	Greene 7'; D. Gregory 78'	Report	Ormerod 11'; Hughes 88'	Stadium: Layer Road; Attendance: 3,228; Referee: Steve Baines

26 December 1998 22	Fulham	2–0	Colchester United	Fulham
12:00 GMT	Smith 26'; Hayles 72' (pen.)	Report	Emberson (red card) 72'	Stadium: Craven Cottage; Attendance: 11,939; Referee: Peter Walton

28 December 1998 23	Colchester United	0–3	Bristol Rovers	Colchester
13:00 GMT		Report	Cureton 2'; Roberts 44'; Ipoua 84'; Shore (red card) 69'	Stadium: Layer Road; Attendance: 4,609; Referee: Keith Hill

2 January 1999 24	Colchester United	2–2	Luton Town	Colchester
15:00 GMT	D. Gregory 20' (pen.); Abrahams 84'	Report	Alexander 7' (pen.); White 72'	Stadium: Layer Road; Attendance: 4,964; Referee: Barry Knight

9 January 1999 25	Chesterfield	3–1	Colchester United	Chesterfield
	Wilkinson 61'; Howard 68'; Reeves 81'	Report	LuaLua 75'	Stadium: Saltergate; Attendance: 3,761; Referee: William Burns

15 January 1999 26	Colchester United	1–3	Wrexham	Colchester
19:45 GMT	Wilkins 15'	Report	Whitley 9'; Haydon 11' (o.g.); Griffiths 24'	Stadium: Layer Road; Attendance: 3,491; Referee: Steve Bennett

23 January 1999 27	Stoke City	3–3	Colchester United	Stoke-on-Trent
	D. Gregory 30' (o.g.); Lightbourne 34'; Sigurðsson 42'	Report	Betts 9'; D. Gregory 44'; Dozzell 80'	Stadium: Britannia Stadium; Attendance: 12,507; Referee: T Jones

30 January 1999 28	Bristol Rovers	1–1	Colchester United	Bristol
	Roberts 28'	Report	D. Gregory 88' (pen.)	Stadium: Memorial Stadium; Attendance: 6,249; Referee: P Richards

5 February 1999 29	Colchester United	2–1	York City	Colchester
19:45 GMT	Betts 1'; Greene 4'	Report	Cresswell 74' (pen.)	Stadium: Layer Road; Attendance: 3,982; Referee: Paul Rejer

12 February 1999 30	Colchester United	2–1	Wigan Athletic	Colchester
19:45 GMT	Wilkins 22'; D. Gregory 28'	Report	Sharp 70'	Stadium: Layer Road; Attendance: 3,934; Referee: M Fletcher

20 February 1999 31	Gillingham	1–1	Colchester United	Gillingham
15:00 GMT	Asaba 22' (red card) 41'	Report	Duguid 64'; Greene (red card) 41'	Stadium: Priestfield Stadium; Attendance: 7,276; Referee: J Kirkby

27 February 1999 32	Colchester United	1–1	Reading	Colchester
15:00 GMT	N. Gregory 8'	Report	Parkinson 81'	Stadium: Layer Road; Attendance: 4,686; Referee: Anthony Bates

6 March 1999 33	Wycombe Wanderers	2–2	Colchester United	High Wycombe
15:00 GMT	Baird 57'; Scott 75'	Report	Dozzell 18'; D. Gregory 90' (pen.)	Stadium: Adams Park; Attendance: 4,670; Referee: Fraser Stretton

9 March 1999 34	Colchester United	2–2	Oldham Athletic	Colchester
19:45 GMT	Allen 40'; D. Gregory 67' (pen.)	Report	Whitehall 5'; Duxbury 75'	Stadium: Layer Road; Attendance: 3,616; Referee: Keith Hill

13 March 1999 35	Macclesfield Town	2–0	Colchester United	Macclesfield
	Landon 65'; Bailey 90'	Report		Stadium: Moss Rose; Attendance: 2,796; Referee: B Coddington

20 March 1999 36	Colchester United	0–1	Manchester City	Colchester
18:00 GMT		Report	Goater 55'	Stadium: Layer Road; Attendance: 6,554; Referee: Rob Styles

27 March 1999 37	AFC Bournemouth	2–1	Colchester United	Bournemouth
12:00 GMT	Warren 35'; Hughes 40'	Report	Greene 20'	Stadium: Dean Court; Attendance: 6,442; Referee: M Pierce

2 April 1999 38	Colchester United	1–0	Preston North End	Colchester
19:45 BST	Aspinall 78'	Report	Clement (yellow card) 51' (red card)	Stadium: Layer Road; Attendance: 5,644; Referee: P Robinson

5 April 1999 39	Burnley	3–1	Colchester United	Burnley
	Johnrose 57'; Payton 82', 89'	Report	D. Gregory 26'; LuaLua (red card) 54'	Stadium: Turf Moor; Attendance: 10,747; Referee: G Cain

10 April 1999 40	Colchester United	1–0	Walsall	Colchester
15:00 BST	Greene 45'	Report		Stadium: Layer Road; Attendance: 4,082; Referee: Mark Halsey

14 April 1999 41	Millwall	2–0	Colchester United	Bermondsey
	Grant 1', 16' (pen.)	Report		Stadium: The Den; Attendance: 4,686; Referee: Lee Cable

16 April 1999 42	Colchester United	2–1	Notts County	Colchester
19:45 BST	Buckle 37'; Aspinall 86' (pen.)	Report	Stallard 7'	Stadium: Layer Road; Attendance: 4,215; Referee: D Crick

24 April 1999 43	Northampton Town	3–3	Colchester United	Northampton
15:00 BST	Savage 18'; Corazzin 41' (pen.); Howey 63'	Report	Buckle 3'; Aspinall 47' (pen.); Duguid 71'	Stadium: Sixfields Stadium; Attendance: 6,146; Referee: G Frankland

27 April 1999 44	Colchester United	2–1	AFC Bournemouth	Colchester
19:45 BST	Hayter 11' (o.g.); Dozzell 67'	Report	Greene 34' (o.g.)	Stadium: Layer Road; Attendance: 4,168; Referee: Lee Cable

1 May 1999 45	Colchester United	1–3	Lincoln City	Colchester
15:00 BST	Duguid 49'	Report	Gordon 43'; Thorpe 44', 75'	Stadium: Layer Road; Attendance: 4,613; Referee: Andy Hall

8 May 1999 46	Blackpool	2–1	Colchester United	Blackpool
	Ormerod 1'; Clarkson 89'	Report	Pounewatchy 27'	Stadium: Bloomfield Road; Attendance: 4,866; Referee: D Laws

=== Football League Cup ===
11 August 1998 1st round 1st leg	AFC Bournemouth	2–0	Colchester United	Bournemouth
	Robinson 16'; Howe 87'	Report		Stadium: Dean Court; Attendance: 3,745; Referee: Clive Wilkes

18 August 1998 1st round 2nd leg	Colchester United	3–2	AFC Bournemouth	Colchester
19:45 BST	D. Gregory 12' (pen.), 90' (pen.); Abrahams 66'	Report	Stein 23'; Fletcher 28'	Stadium: Layer Road; Attendance: 2,550; Referee: Barry Knight
Note: Bournemouth win 4–3 on aggregate.

=== FA Cup ===
14 November 1998 1st round	Bedlington Terriers	4–1	Colchester United	Bedlington
	Ditchburn 16'; Milner 23', 86' (pen.); Cross 60'	Report	Adcock 88'	Stadium: Welfare Park; Attendance: 2,027; Referee: Matt Messias

=== Football League Trophy ===
5 December 1998 1st round (southern section)	Colchester United	1–5	Gillingham	Colchester
15:00 GMT	D. Gregory 23'	Report	Asaba 22'; Pennock 29'; Taylor 34', 67'; Smith 37'	Stadium: Layer Road; Attendance: 1,742; Referee: B Jordan

== Squad statistics ==
=== Appearances and goals ===
No.	Pos	Nat	Player	Total		Second Division		FA Cup		League Cup		Football League Trophy	
No.	Pos	Nat	Player	Apps	Goals	Apps	Goals	Apps	Goals	Apps	Goals	Apps	Goals
	GK	(England) ENG	Carl Emberson	41	0	37	0	1	0	2	0	1	0
	GK	(England) ENG	Tamer Fernandes	8	0	8	0	0	0	0	0	0	0
	GK	(England) ENG	Andy Walker	1	0	1	0	0	0	0	0	0	0
	DF	(England) ENG	Simon Betts	31	2	22+6	2	0	0	2	0	1	0
	DF	(Republic of Ireland) IRL	Joe Dunne	39	0	32+4	0	1	0	0+1	0	1	0
	DF	(Republic of Ireland) IRL	David Greene	46	8	42	8	1	0	2	0	1	0
	DF	(England) ENG	Nicky Haydon	16	1	7+6	1	0+1	0	2	0	0	0
	DF	(France) FRA	Stéphane Pounewatchy	15	1	15	1	0	0	0	0	0	0
	DF	(France) FRA	Fabrice Richard	10	0	10	0	0	0	0	0	0	0
	DF	(England) ENG	Scott Stamps	25	0	19+2	0	1	0	2	0	0+1	0
	MF	(England) ENG	Warren Aspinall	15	3	15	3	0	0	0	0	0	0
	MF	(England) ENG	Paul Buckle	47	2	39+4	2	1	0	2	0	1	0
	MF	(England) ENG	Jason Dozzell	31	4	23+6	4	1	0	0	0	0+1	0
	MF	(England) ENG	Karl Duguid	35	4	23+10	4	0+1	0	0+1	0	0	0
	MF	(England) ENG	Steve Forbes	18	2	8+7	2	1	0	0+1	0	1	0
	MF	(England) ENG	David Gregory	48	14	43+1	11	1	0	2	2	1	1
	MF	(Nigeria) NGA	Sam Okafor	1	0	0+1	0	0	0	0	0	0	0
	MF	(England) ENG	Dave Rainford	1	0	0+1	0	0	0	0	0	0	0
	MF	(England) ENG	Aaron Skelton	9	0	7+2	0	0	0	0	0	0	0
	MF	(England) ENG	Richard Wilkins	26	2	25+1	2	0	0	0	0	0	0
	MF	(Wales) WAL	Geraint Williams	43	0	38+1	0	1	0	2	0	1	0
	FW	(England) ENG	Paul Abrahams	30	3	13+14	2	0	0	2	1	1	0
	FW	(England) ENG	Tony Adcock	8	1	0+6	0	0+1	1	0+1	0	0	0
	FW	(England) ENG	Neil Gregory	41	4	29+9	4	0	0	2	0	1	0
	FW	(England) ENG	Tony Lock	25	1	14+9	1	1	0	0	0	0+1	0
	FW	(Democratic Republic of the Congo) COD	Lomana LuaLua	13	1	6+7	1	0	0	0	0	0	0
	FW	(Nigeria) NGA	KK Opara	1	0	0+1	0	0	0	0	0	0	0
	FW	(England) ENG	Mark Sale	35	2	21+10	2	1	0	2	0	1	0
Players who appeared for Colchester who left during the season
	DF	(England) ENG	Guy Branston	1	0	0+1	0	0	0	0	0	0	0
	DF	(England) ENG	Keith Dublin	2	0	2	0	0	0	0	0	0	0
	DF	(England) ENG	Ian Wiles	1	0	0+1	0	0	0	0	0	0	0
	MF	(Brazil) BRA	Fumaça	1	0	1	0	0	0	0	0	0	0
	MF	(Republic of Ireland) IRL	Brian Launders	1	0	1	0	0	0	0	0	0	0
	FW	(England) ENG	Bradley Allen	4	1	4	1	0	0	0	0	0	0
	FW	(France) FRA	Steve Germain	6	0	1+5	0	0	0	0	0	0	0

=== Goalscorers ===
Place	Nationality	Position	Name	Second Division	FA Cup	League Cup	Football League Trophy	Total
1	(England)	MF	David Gregory	11	0	2	1	14
2	(Republic of Ireland)	CB	David Greene	8	0	0	0	8
3	(England)	MF	Jason Dozzell	4	0	0	0	4
3	(England)	MF	Karl Duguid	4	0	0	0	4
3	(England)	FW	Neil Gregory	4	0	0	0	4
6	(England)	FW/WG	Paul Abrahams	2	0	1	0	3
6	(England)	MF	Warren Aspinall	3	0	0	0	3
8	(England)	FB	Simon Betts	2	0	0	0	2
8	(England)	MF	Paul Buckle	2	0	0	0	2
8	(England)	MF	Steve Forbes	2	0	0	0	2
8	(England)	FW	Mark Sale	2	0	0	0	2
8	(England)	MF/DF	Richard Wilkins	2	0	0	0	2
13	(England)	FW	Tony Adcock	0	1	0	0	1
13	(England)	FW	Bradley Allen	1	0	0	0	1
13	(England)	DF/MF	Nicky Haydon	1	0	0	0	1
13	(England)	FW	Tony Lock	1	0	0	0	1
13	(Democratic Republic of the Congo)	FW	Lomana LuaLua	1	0	0	0	1
13	(France)	CB	Stéphane Pounewatchy	1	0	0	0	1
			Own goals	1	0	0	0	1
			TOTALS	52	1	3	1	57

=== Disciplinary record ===
Nationality	Position	Name	Second Division		FA Cup		League Cup		Football League Trophy		Total	
Nationality	Position	Name	Booked	Sent off (straight red)	Booked	Sent off (straight red)	Booked	Sent off (straight red)	Booked	Sent off (straight red)	Booked	Sent off (straight red)
(Republic of Ireland)	CB	David Greene	5	1	1	0	0	0	0	0	6	1
(England)	FW	Neil Gregory	6	0	0	0	0	0	0	0	6	0
(England)	FW	Mark Sale	5	0	1	0	0	0	0	0	6	0
(England)	FB	Scott Stamps	6	0	0	0	0	0	0	0	6	0
(England)	MF	Jason Dozzell	5	0	0	0	0	0	0	0	5	0
(England)	MF	Karl Duguid	5	0	0	0	0	0	0	0	5	0
(France)	CB	Stéphane Pounewatchy	5	0	0	0	0	0	0	0	5	0
(England)	MF	Warren Aspinall	4	0	0	0	0	0	0	0	4	0
(England)	FB	Simon Betts	3	0	0	0	0	0	1	0	4	0
(England)	MF	Paul Buckle	4	0	0	0	0	0	0	0	4	0
(Republic of Ireland)	FB	Joe Dunne	4	0	0	0	0	0	0	0	4	0
(England)	GK	Carl Emberson	0	1	1	0	0	0	0	0	1	1
(England)	MF	David Gregory	4	0	0	0	0	0	0	0	4	0
(England)	MF	Steve Forbes	3	0	0	0	0	0	0	0	3	0
(Democratic Republic of the Congo)	FW	Lomana LuaLua	0	1	0	0	0	0	0	0	0	1
(England)	FW/WG	Paul Abrahams	2	0	0	0	0	0	0	0	2	0
(England)	MF/DF	Richard Wilkins	2	0	0	0	0	0	0	0	2	0
(Wales)	MF	Geraint Williams	1	0	0	0	1	0	0	0	2	0
(England)	FW	Bradley Allen	1	0	0	0	0	0	0	0	1	0
(England)	CB	Keith Dublin	1	0	0	0	0	0	0	0	1	0
(France)	FB	Fabrice Richard	1	0	0	0	0	0	0	0	1	0
		TOTALS	67	3	3	1	0	0	1	0	72	3

=== Clean sheets ===
Number of games goalkeepers kept a clean sheet.

Place	Nationality	Player	Second Division	FA Cup	League Cup	Football League Trophy	Total
1	(England)	Carl Emberson	6	0	0	0	6
		TOTALS	6	0	0	0	6

=== Player debuts ===
Players making their first-team Colchester United debut in a fully competitive match.

Position	Nationality	Player	Date	Opponent	Ground	Notes
MF	(Wales)	Geraint Williams	8 August 1998	Chesterfield	Layer Road	
CB	(England)	Ian Wiles	15 August 1998	Wrexham	Racecourse Ground	
MF	(Wales)	Dave Rainford	5 September 1998	York City	Bootham Crescent	
CB	(England)	Guy Branston	3 October 1998	Oldham Athletic	Boundary Park	(Note: Second debut for the club)
MF	(England)	Jason Dozzell	17 October 1998	Preston North End	Deepdale	
CB	(England)	Keith Dublin	21 November 1998	Notts County	Meadow Lane	
GK	(England)	Tamer Fernandes	2 January 1999	Luton Town	Layer Road	
FW	(Democratic Republic of the Congo)	Lomana LuaLua	9 January 1999	Chesterfield	Saltergate	
MF	(England)	Warren Aspinall	20 February 1999	Gillingham	Priestfield Stadium	
CB	(France)	Stéphane Pounewatchy	20 February 1999	Gillingham	Priestfield Stadium	
FW	(England)	Bradley Allen	27 February 1999	Reading	Layer Road	
MF	(Brazil)	Fumaça	29 March 1999	Manchester City	Layer Road	
MF	(England)	Warren Aspinall	27 March 1999	AFC Bournemouth	Dean Court	
MF	(Republic of Ireland)	Brian Launders	27 March 1999	AFC Bournemouth	Dean Court	
FB	(France)	Fabrice Richard	27 March 1999	AFC Bournemouth	Dean Court	
FW	(France)	Steve Germain	2 April 1999	Preston North End	Layer Road	
MF	(Nigeria)	Sam Okafor	8 May 1999	Blackpool	Bloomfield Road	
FW	(Nigeria)	KK Opara	8 May 1999	Blackpool	Bloomfield Road	
GK	(England)	Andy Walker	8 May 1999	Blackpool	Bloomfield Road	

== See also ==
- List of Colchester United F.C. seasons
