= 1997–98 Manchester City F.C. season =

English football club season

Manchester City
1997–98 season
- Chairman: Francis Lee; David Bernstein
- Manager: Frank Clark (until 17 February); Joe Royle (from 18 February)
- Stadium: Maine Road
- First Division: 22nd (relegated)
- FA Cup: Fourth round
- League Cup: First round
- Top goalscorer: League: Paul Dickov (9); All: Paul Dickov (9)
- Highest home attendance: 32,040 – (25 April vs Queens Park Rangers, First Division)
- Lowest home attendance: 12,563 – (12 August vs Blackpool, League Cup first round)
- Average home league attendance: 28,037
Home colours	Away colours	Third colours

The 1997–98 season was Manchester City's second in the First Division following relegation from the Premier League in 1995–96. The 1996–97 season had been a turbulent one; Five different managers took charge of the team over the course of the season (three permanent appointments and two caretakers), including Steve Coppell, who resigned after just 32 days as manager. Frank Clark became manager in December 1996 and was in charge for the start of the 1997–98 season.

Despite speculation that linked him with a transfer, 1996–97 Player of the Season Georgi Kinkladze stayed at the club, and signed a three-year contract that made him the highest-paid player in Manchester City's history. The highest profile signing was striker Lee Bradbury, who joined from Portsmouth for a club record £3 million. Defender Tony Vaughan arrived from Ipswich Town. His transfer free was decided by tribunal and set at £1.35 million, more than double City's valuation. The club also signed Dutch midfielder Gerard Wiekens from BV Veendam for £500,000. Wiekens had agreed to join the club in March, but the move only took place once the previous season had finished. Departing was Peter Beagrie, sold to Bradford City for £200,000. In an early-season interview with the Sunday Times, Frank Clark bemoaned the difficulty of reducing the size of his squad, which contained 40 senior professionals: "This squad is too big, but a lot of the players are on good contracts which other clubs won't match. You can't blame them for staying." "We've got around 12 very good youngsters whose potential is really encouraging, but they can't get a reserve-team game. Because we've got to fill the reserves with senior pros needing match practice or players we're trying to sell, the youngsters' development is held up."

Joe Royle replaced Frank Clark in February 1998.

Off the field, the club introduced a new badge, and changed the colour of the home shirt to a much deeper shade termed "laser blue". The new kit was made by Kappa; this ended a 63-year association with Umbro.

In its preview of the forthcoming season, The Times listed bookmakers odds that put Manchester City as 6/1 joint second favourites to win the division.

== Team kit ==
Home	Away	Third

== League ==
The league campaign started with a home match against Portsmouth. Bradbury, Vaughan and Wiekens all made their debuts. The match finished 2–2, with a debut goal for Wiekens. The first away match was a trip to Sunderland, a match that was the first competitive fixture at the Stadium of Light. City lost 3–1 to a team spearheaded by their former striker Niall Quinn. Jason van Blerk made his debut in the match, having signed on a free transfer in the run-up to the fixture. The first league win did not arrive until the fifth match, when Nottingham Forest were beaten at the City Ground. Three games later City's second win of the season was emphatic, 6–0 at home to Swindon Town.

Lee Bradbury cracked a vertebra at the start of October, and coupled with an injury to Uwe Rösler, City were left with few options in attack. The team scored just one goal in October. A succession of reserve strikers were tried; Barry Conlon, Chris Greenacre, Ray Kelly and Gerry Creaney all saw their first action of the season. The situation was exacerbated in late October when Kinkladze crashed his Ferrari, sustaining a back injury that required 30 stitches and caused him to miss two matches. By November City lay in the relegation zone with just 3 wins from 16 matches. A home defeat to Huddersfield Town led to open rebellion amongst the club's supporters. On the tenth anniversary of a match in which the same opposition were beaten 10–1, Manchester City succumbed to a defeat that was last-placed club Huddersfield's first away win of the season. Choruses of "You're not fit to wear the shirt" rang out during the match. Afterward two thousand supporters held a demonstration demanding the resignation of chairman Francis Lee. The season hit a new low with 3–1 away defeat to local rivals Stockport County who were having the best season in their history. The club picked up enough wins here and there to at least stay out of the relegation zone, but then a horrific run of form after Christmas saw the club dumped to the bottom of the table following a 2–1 loss to Ipswich Town in February. This proved the end of the road for Clark, who was sacked later that day and replaced by Joe Royle, who had been out of the game since resigning as Everton manager a year prior.

A run of three wins from Royle's first four matches seemed to get things back on track for City, but then the club's form slumped again, and most damagingly they lost virtually all of their matches against the other teams involved in the relegation struggle. Francis Lee finally resigned during this poor run-in, with David Bernstein replacing him as chairman. A failure to beat Queens Park Rangers in their penultimate match left the Blues needing to defeat Stoke City and hope that at least one of Port Vale and Portsmouth would fail to win their own final matches to preserve their First Division status. In the end, City were able to beat Stoke, however both Port Vale and Portsmouth also won that day to send City into the third tier for the first time in their history.

=== Table ===
Pos	Team	Pld	W	D	L	GF	GA	GD	Pts	Qualification or relegation
20	Portsmouth	46	13	10	23	51	63	−12	49	
21	Queens Park Rangers	46	10	19	17	51	63	−12	49	
22	Manchester City (R)	46	12	12	22	56	57	−1	48	Relegation to the Second Division
23	Stoke City (R)	46	11	13	22	44	74	−30	46	Relegation to the Second Division
24	Reading (R)	46	11	9	26	39	78	−39	42	Relegation to the Second Division

Source: Statto.com
Rules for classification: 1) Points; 2) Goals scored; 3) Goal difference
(R) Relegated

=== Results summary ===
Overall								Home						Away					
Pld	W	D	L	GF	GA	GD	Pts	W	D	L	GF	GA	GD	W	D	L	GF	GA	GD
46	12	12	22	56	57	−1	48	6	6	11	28	26	+2	6	6	11	28	31	−3

=== Matches ===
9 August 1997 1	Manchester City	2–2	Portsmouth	Manchester
	Rösler 16'; Wiekens 55'		Aloisi 5'; Hall 80'	Stadium: Maine Road; Attendance: 30,474; Referee: David Laws

15 August 1997 2	Sunderland	3–1	Manchester City	Sunderland
	Quinn 17'; Phillips 84'; Clark 89'		Kinkladze 76' (pen.)	Stadium: Stadium of Light; Attendance: 38,827; Referee: Eddie Wolstenholme

22 August 1997 3	Manchester City	1–1	Tranmere Rovers	Manchester
	Horlock 46'		Jones 61'	Stadium: Maine Road; Attendance: 26,336; Referee: John Brandwood

29 August 1997 4	Charlton Athletic	2–1	Manchester City	London
	Van Blerk 67' (o.g.); Jones 69'		Wiekens 20'	Stadium: The Valley; Attendance: 14,009; Referee: Rob Harris

3 September 1997 5	Nottingham Forest	1–3	Manchester City	Nottingham
	Campbell 81'		Brannan 20', 71'; Dickov 88'	Stadium: City Ground; Attendance: 23,681; Referee: Stephen Finch

12 September 1997 6	Bury	1–1	Manchester City	Bury
	Johnson 65'		Morley 81'	Stadium: Gigg Lane; Attendance: 11,216; Referee: Phil Richards

20 September 1997 7	Manchester City	1–2	Norwich City	Manchester
	Bradbury 27'		Adams 38'; Coote 64'	Stadium: Maine Road; Attendance: 27,258; Referee: Alan Butler

27 September 1997 8	Manchester City	6–0	Swindon Town	Manchester
	Kinkladze 7'; Casper 17' (o.g.); Horlock 37'; Dickov 50', 59'; Bradbury 80'			Stadium: Maine Road; Attendance: 26,646; Referee: Roy Pearson

4 October 1997 9	Ipswich Town	1–0	Manchester City	Ipswich
	Mathie 63'			Stadium: Portman Road; Attendance: 14,322; Referee: Mike Bailey

18 October 1997 10	Manchester City	0–0	Reading	Manchester
				Stadium: Maine Road; Attendance: 26,488

22 October 1997 11	Manchester City	0–1	Stoke City	Manchester
			Wallace 63'	Stadium: Maine Road; Attendance: 25,333; Referee: Anthony Leake

26 October 1997 12	Queens Park Rangers	2–0	Manchester City	Shepherd's Bush, London
	Ready 13'; Peacock 33'			Stadium: Loftus Road; Attendance: 14,451; Referee: Rob Harris

29 October 1997 13	Manchester City	1–0	Crewe Alexandra	Manchester
	Greenacre 44'			Stadium: Maine Road; Attendance: 27,384; Referee: Kevin Lynch

1 November 1997 14	Oxford United	0–0	Manchester City	Oxford
				Stadium: Kassam Stadium; Attendance: 8,592; Referee: David Orr

4 November 1997 15	Manchester City	2–3	Port Vale	Manchester
	Wiekens 15'; Dickov 41'		Snijders 17'; Talbot 45'; Naylor 50'	Stadium: Maine Road; Attendance: 24,554; Referee: John Brandwood

7 November 1997 16	Manchester City	0–1	Huddersfield Town	Manchester
			Edwards 76'	Stadium: Maine Road; Attendance: 24,425; Referee: Graham Frankland

15 November 1997 17	Sheffield United	1–1	Manchester City	Sheffield
	Deane 21'		Horlock 90'	Stadium: Bramall Lane; Attendance: 23,850; Referee: Paul Rejer

22 November 1997 18	Manchester City	1–0	Bradford City	Manchester
	Vaughan 90'			Stadium: Maine Road; Attendance: 29,746; Referee: Guy Stretton

21 November 1997 19	Stockport County	3–1	Manchester City	Stockport
	Cook 6'; Armstrong 8'; Angell 30'		Brannan 49'	Stadium: Edgeley Park; Attendance: 11,351; Referee: Eddie Wolstenholme

28 November 1997 20	West Bromwich Albion	0–1	Manchester City	West Bromwich
			Dickov 55'	Stadium: The Hawthorns; Attendance: 17,904; Referee: John Kirkby

6 December 1997 21	Manchester City	0–1	Wolverhampton Wanderers	Manchester
			Symons 42'	Stadium: Maine Road; Attendance: 28,999; Referee: Clive Wilkes

13 December 1997 22	Birmingham City	2–1	Manchester City	Birmingham
	O'Connor 90'; Forster 90'		Shelia 88'	Stadium: St Andrew's; Attendance: 21,014; Referee: Andy D'Urso

20 December 1997 23	Manchester City	2–0	Middlesbrough	Manchester
	Rösler 17' (pen.); Dickov 32'			Stadium: Maine Road; Attendance: 28,097; Referee: Mike C Bailey

26 December 1997 24	Crewe Alexandra	1–0	Manchester City	Crewe
	Holsgrove 19'			Stadium: Alexandra Stadium; Attendance: 5,759; Referee: Trevor Jones

28 December 1997 25	Manchester City	2–3	Nottingham Forest	Manchester
	Shelia 56'; Dickov 77'		van Hooijdonk 31' (pen.), 53' (pen.); Campbell 50'	Stadium: Maine Road; Attendance: 31,839; Referee: Alan Wiley

10 January 1998 26	Portsmouth	0–3	Manchester City	Portsmouth
			Russell 44'; Kinkladze 51'; Rösler 89'	Stadium: Fratton Park; Attendance: 13,512; Referee: Paul Taylor

17 January 1998 27	Manchester City	0–1	Sunderland	Manchester
			Phillips 55'	Stadium: Maine Road; Attendance: 31,715; Referee: Matt Messias

28 January 1998 28	Manchester City	2–2	Charlton Athletic	Manchester
	Dickov 7' (pen.); Symons 88'		Jones 74', 90'	Stadium: Maine Road; Attendance: 24,058; Referee: Phil Richards

31 January 1998 29	Tranmere Rovers	0–0	Manchester City	Birkenhead
				Stadium: Prenton Park; Attendance: 12,830; Referee: Clive Wilkes

7 February 1998 30	Norwich City	0–0	Manchester City	Norwich
				Stadium: Carrow Road; Attendance: 15,274; Referee: Barry Knight

14 February 1998 31	Manchester City	0–1	Bury	Manchester
			Butler 52'	Stadium: Maine Road; Attendance: 28,885; Referee: Terry Heilbron

18 February 1998 32	Manchester City	1–2	Ipswich Town	Manchester
	Symons 5'		Mathie 83'; Dyer 90'	Stadium: Maine Road; Attendance: 27,156; Referee: Graham Frankland

21 February 1998 33	Swindon Town	1–3	Manchester City	Swindon
	Cowe 71'		Rösler 22', 77'; Bradbury 83'	Stadium: County Ground; Attendance: 12,280; Referee: Brian Coddington

24 February 1998 34	Reading	3–0	Manchester City	Reading
	Hodges 8'; Houghton 29'; Asaba 89'			Stadium: Elm Park; Attendance: 11,513; Referee: Anthony Bates

28 February 1998 35	Manchester City	1–0	West Bromwich Albion	Manchester
	Rösler 43'			Stadium: Maine Road; Attendance: 28,460; Referee: Alan Butler

3 March 1998 36	Huddersfield Town	1–3	Manchester City	Huddersfield
	Dalton 38' (pen.)		Wiekens 10'; Briscoe 45'; Tskhadadze 65'	Stadium: Alfred McAlpine Stadion; Attendance: 15,694; Referee: George Cain

7 March 1998 37	Manchester City	0–2	Oxford United	Manchester
			Beauchamp 44'; Cook 81'	Stadium: Maine Road; Attendance: 28,720; Referee: William Burns (referee)

14 March 1998 38	Port Vale	2–1	Manchester City	Stoke-on-Trent
	Foyle 13'; Ainsworth 73'		Wiekens 61'	Stadium: Vale Park; Attendance: 13,122; Referee: Roger Furnandiz

21 March 1998 39	Manchester City	0–0	Sheffield United	Manchester
				Stadium: Maine Road; Attendance: 28,496; Referee: Roy Pearson

28 March 1998 40	Bradford City	2–1	Manchester City	Bradford
	Pepper 49'; Edinho 66'		Whitley 24'	Stadium: Valley Parade; Attendance: 17,099; Referee: Eddie Wolstenholme

4 April 1998 41	Manchester City	4–1	Stockport County	Manchester
	Goater 5'; Jobson 32'; Bradbury 37', 57'		Wilbraham 6'	Stadium: Maine Road; Attendance: 31,855; Referee: Rob Harris

11 April 1998 42	Wolverhampton Wanderers	2–2	Manchester City	Wolverhampton
	Margetson 34'; Simpson 85'		Pollock 13'; Horlock 63'	Stadium: Molineux Stadium; Attendance: 24,458; Referee: Mark Halsey

13 April 1998 43	Manchester City	0–1	Birmingham City	Manchester
			Adebola 90'	Stadium: Maine Road; Attendance: 29,569; Referee: Terry Heilbron

17 April 1998 44	Middlesbrough	1–0	Manchester City	Middlesbrough
	Armstrong 43'			Stadium: Riverside Stadium; Attendance: 30,182; Referee: Alan Wiley

25 April 1998 45	Manchester City	2–2	Queens Park Rangers	Manchester
	Kinkladze 1'; Bradbury 48'		Sheron 8'; Pollock 21' (o.g.)	Stadium: Maine Road; Attendance: 32,040

3 May 1998 46	Stoke City	2–5	Manchester City	Stoke-on-Trent
	Thorne 62', 87'		Goater 32', 71'; Dickov 49'; Bradbury 64'; Horlock 90'	Stadium: Britannia Stadium; Attendance: 28,000; Referee: Mike C Bailey

== FA Cup ==
Manchester City entered the FA Cup in the third round, the starting point for all clubs in the top two divisions. Drawn at home to fellow First Division club Bradford City, Manchester City won 2–0. Another home tie followed in the fourth round, against Premier League club West Ham United. City trailed 1–0 at half time, but a solo goal from Georgi Kinkladze levelled the score. A penalty gave City the chance to take the lead, but Uwe Rösler's kick went high over the crossbar. Two minutes later, former City player Steve Lomas scored for West Ham. City lost 2–1 and exited the competition.

Date	Round	Opponents	H / A	Venue	Result F – A	Scorers	Attendance
3 January 1998	Third round	Bradford City	H	Maine Road	2 – 0	Brown, Rösler	23,686
25 January 1998	Fourth round	West Ham United	H	Maine Road	1 – 2	Kinkladze	26,495

== League Cup ==
Manchester City entered the League Cup in the first round for the first time. In previous years, the club's league position had been sufficient to gain a bye into the second round. Blackpool were the opposition in the first round, for which ties were played over two legs. In the first leg, at Bloomfield Road, City lost 1–0. The return leg was chosen for live television coverage. Kevin Horlock scored with two minutes of normal time remaining to make the score 1–1 on aggregate and take the tie to extra time. No goals were scored in extra time, so the result was decided by a penalty shootout. Horlock and Bradbury's kicks missed, and Blackpool won the shootout 4–2.

Date	Round	Opponents	H / A	Venue	Result F – A	Scorers	Attendance
12 August 1997	First round first leg	Blackpool	A	Bloomfield Road	0 – 1		8,084
26 August 1997	First round second leg	Blackpool	H	Maine Road	1 – 0 (aet, 2 – 4 pens)	Horlock	12,563

== Squad ==
Appearances for competitive matches only, substitute appearances in brackets

Pos.	Name	Apps	Goals	Apps	Goals	Apps	Goals	Apps	Goals
Pos.	Name	League		FA Cup		League Cup		Total	
GK	(Wales) Martyn Margetson	28	0	0	0	2	0	30	0
GK	(Northern Ireland) Tommy Wright	18	0	2	0	0	0	20	0
DF	(England) Paul Beesley	4 (3)	0	0	0	0	0	4 (3)	0
DF	(England) Ian Brightwell	19 (2)	0	2	0	2	0	23 (2)	0
DF	(England) Lee Briscoe	5	1	0	0	0	0	5	1
DF	(England) Lee Crooks	3 (2)	0	0	0	0	0	3 (2)	0
DF	(England) Richard Edghill	36	0	1	0	0	0	37	0
DF	(England) Richard Jobson	6	1	0	0	0	0	6	1
DF	(Republic of Ireland) Alan Kernaghan	1	0	0	0	1	0	2	0
DF	(England) Dave Morley	1 (2)	1	0	0	0	0	1 (2)	0
DF	(Georgia (country)) Murtaz Shelia	12	2	2	0	0	0	14	2
DF	(Wales) Kit Symons	42	2	1	0	1	0	44	2
DF	(Georgia (country)) Kakhaber Tskhadadze	10	1	0	0	0	0	10	1
DF	(Australia) Jason van Blerk	10 (9)	0	0 (1)	0	0 (1)	0	10 (11)	0
DF	(England) Tony Vaughan	19	1	0	0	2	0	21	1
DF/MF	(Netherlands) Gerard Wiekens	35 (2)	5	1	0	2	0	38 (2)	5
MF	(England) Peter Beardsley	5 (1)	0	0	0	0	0	5 (1)	0
MF	(England) Ian Bishop	4 (2)	0	0	0	0	0	4 (2)	0
MF	(England) Ged Brannan	27 (5)	3	1	0	2	0	32 (5)	3
MF	(England) Michael Brown	18 (8)	0	0	0	1	0	18 (8)	0
MF	(England) Neil Heaney	3	0	0	0	0	0	3	0
MF	(Northern Ireland) Kevin Horlock	25	5	0	0	2	1	27	6
MF	(Georgia (country)) Georgi Kinkladze	29 (1)	4	2	1	2	0	33 (1)	5
MF	(Republic of Ireland) Eddie McGoldrick	6 (1)	0	0	0	0 (1)	0	6 (2)	0
MF	(Scotland) Jamie Pollock	8	1	0	0	0	0	8	1
MF	(Republic of Ireland) Tony Scully	1 (8)	0	0	0	0	0	1 (8)	0
MF	(England) Nicky Summerbee	4 (5)	0	0	0	2	0	6 (5)	0
MF	(Northern Ireland) Jeff Whitley	14 (3)	1	1	0	0	0	15 (3)	1
MF	(Northern Ireland) Jim Whitley	17 (2)	0	1 (1)	0	0	0	18 (3)	0
FW	(England) Lee Bradbury	23 (4)	7	0	0	2	0	25 (4)	7
FW	(Scotland) Gerry Creaney	1	0	0	0	0	0	1	0
FW	(Republic of Ireland) Barry Conlon	1 (6)	0	0	0	0	0	1 (6)	0
FW	(Scotland) Paul Dickov	21 (9)	9	2	0	0 (1)	0	23 (10)	9
FW	(Bermuda) Shaun Goater	7	3	0	0	0	0	7	3
FW	(England) Chris Greenacre	2 (1)	1	0 (1)	0	0	0	2 (2)	1
FW	(Republic of Ireland) Ray Kelly	1	0	0	0	0	0	1	0
FW	(Germany) Uwe Rösler	23 (6)	6	2	1	2	0	27 (6)	7
FW	(England) Craig Russell	17 (7)	1	2	0	0	0	19 (7)	1

== Transfers ==
In

Player	Transferred from	Fee	Date	Ref
Gerard Wiekens	Veendam	£500,000	29 April 1997	
Nicky Weaver	Mansfield Town	£200,000	March 1997	
Tony Vaughan	Ipswich Town	£1.35m	July 1997	
Lee Bradbury	Portsmouth	£3m	July 1997	
Jason van Blerk	Millwall	Free	August 1997	
Tony Scully	Crystal Palace	£300,000	August 1997	
Richard Jobson	Leeds United	Free	March 1998	
Jamie Pollock	Bolton Wanderers	£800,000	March 1998	
Shaun Goater	Bristol City	£400,000	March 1998	
Ian Bishop	West Ham United	Free	March 1998	

Out

Player	Transferred to	Fee	Date	Ref
Peter Beagrie	Bradford City	£200,000	July 1997	
Nigel Clough	Sheffield Wednesday	Loan	September 1997	
Gerry Creaney	Burnley	Loan	September 1997	
Alan Kernaghan	St Johnstone	Loan	September 1997	
Alan Kernaghan	St Johnstone	Free	December 1997	
Gerry Creaney	Chesterfield	Loan	January 1998	
Barry Conlon	Plymouth Argyle	Loan	February 1998	
Jason van Blerk	West Bromwich Albion	£50,000	March 1998	
Paul Beesley	West Bromwich Albion	Loan	March 1998	
Dave Morley	Ayr United	Loan	March 1998	
Tony Scully	Queens Park Rangers	£155,000	March 1998	
Rae Ingram	Macclesfield Town	Loan	March 1998	
Martin Phillips	Exeter City	Loan	March 1998	
John Foster	Carlisle United	Free	March 1998	
Neil Heaney	Charlton Athletic	Loan	March 1998	
Ray Kelly	Wrexham	Loan	March 1998	
Eddie McGoldrick	Stockport County	Loan	March 1998	
Scott Thomas	Brighton	Loan	March 1998	
