= Peter Griffiths (disambiguation) =

Peter Griffiths (1928–2013) was a British politician.

Peter Griffiths may also refer to:

- Peter Griffiths (footballer, born 1862) (1862–?), Welsh footballer
- Peter Griffiths (footballer, born 1957), English footballer
- Peter Griffiths (footballer, born 1980), English footballer
- Peter Griffiths (sport shooter) (1892–1972), British sport shooter
- Peter Griffiths (River City), fictional character
- Peter Griffiths, murderer of June Anne Devaney

== See also ==
- Peter Griffin (disambiguation)
