= 1999–2000 Manchester City F.C. season =

English football club season

Manchester City
1999–2000 season
- Chairman: David Bernstein
- Manager: Joe Royle
- Stadium: Maine Road
- First Division: 2nd (promoted)
- FA Cup: Fourth round
- League Cup: Second round
- Top goalscorer: League: Shaun Goater (23); All: Shaun Goater (29)
- Highest home attendance: 33,027 vs. Blackburn Rovers (23 October 1999)
- Lowest home attendance: 30,057 vs. Fulham (16 January 2000)
- Average home league attendance: 32,088

During the 1999–2000 English football season, Manchester City Football Club competed in the Football League First Division.

== Season summary ==
After gaining promotion to the First Division following a thrilling play-off final against Gillingham, Manchester City won a second successive promotion, coming second in the First Division behind Charlton Athletic, to return to the top flight of English football after a five-year absence.

== Team kit ==
The team kit was produced by Le Coq Sportif and the shirt sponsor was Eidos.

Home	Away	Third

== Final league table ==
Pos	Team	Pld	W	D	L	GF	GA	GD	Pts	Qualification or relegation
1	Charlton Athletic (C, P)	46	27	10	9	79	45	+34	91	Promotion to the Premier League
2	Manchester City (P)	46	26	11	9	78	40	+38	89	Promotion to the Premier League
3	Ipswich Town (O, P)	46	25	12	9	71	42	+29	87	Qualification for the First Division play-offs
4	Barnsley	46	24	10	12	88	67	+21	82	Qualification for the First Division play-offs
5	Birmingham City	46	22	11	13	65	44	+21	77	Qualification for the First Division play-offs

Rules for classification: 1) Points; 2) Goal difference; 3) Goals scored
(C) Champions; (O) Play-off winners; (P) Promoted

Results summary

Overall								Home						Away					
Pld	W	D	L	GF	GA	GD	Pts	W	D	L	GF	GA	GD	W	D	L	GF	GA	GD
46	26	11	9	78	40	+38	89	17	2	4	48	17	+31	9	9	5	30	23	+7

Source: Soccerbase: 1999-2000 Football League First Division table

Results by round

Round	1	2	3	4	5	6	7	8	9	10	11	12	13	14	15	16	17	18	19	20	21	22	23	24	25	26	27	28	29	30	31	32	33	34	35	36	37	38	39	40	41	42	43	44	45	46
Ground	H	A	H	A	H	H	A	A	A	H	A	A	H	H	A	H	A	A	H	H	A	H	H	A	H	A	H	A	A	H	A	H	A	H	A	H	A	H	A	H	H	A	H	A	H	A
Result	L	D	W	W	W	W	W	L	L	W	D	W	W	W	W	W	D	W	W	L	L	L	W	W	W	D	W	L	W	W	D	D	D	L	L	D	D	W	W	W	W	D	W	D	W	W
Position	20	21	8	4	2	2	1	3	4	3	4	1	1	1	1	1	1	1	1	1	1	2	2	1	1	1	2	2	2	2	2	2	2	3	4	2	3	3	3	2	2	2	2	2	2	2

Source: 11v11.com: 1999-2000 Manchester City results
A = Away; H = Home; W = Win; D = Draw; L = Loss

== Results ==
Manchester City's score comes first

=== Legend ===
Win	Draw	Loss

=== Football League First Division ===
Date	Opponent	Venue	Result	Attendance	Scorers
8 August 1999	Wolverhampton Wanderers	H	0-1	31,755	
14 August 1999	Fulham	A	0-0	16,754	
21 August 1999	Sheffield United	H	6-0	30,110	Horlock (2 pens), Kennedy, Goater, Dickov, G Taylor
28 August 1999	Bolton Wanderers	A	1-0	21,671	Kennedy
30 August 1999	Nottingham Forest	H	1-0	31,857	Goater
11 September 1999	Crystal Palace	H	2-1	31,541	Jobson, G Taylor
18 September 1999	Walsall	A	1-0	7,260	Goater
26 September 1999	Ipswich Town	A	1-2	19,406	Goater
28 September 1999	Norwich City	A	0-1	15,130	
2 October 1999	Port Vale	H	2-1	31,608	Bishop (2)
16 October 1999	Tranmere Rovers	A	1-1	13,208	Horlock (pen)
19 October 1999	Birmingham City	A	1-0	22,126	Jobson
23 October 1999	Blackburn Rovers	H	2-0	33,027	Edghill, Whitley
27 October 1999	Ipswich Town	H	1-0	32,799	Horlock
30 October 1999	Port Vale	A	2-1	10,250	Snijders (own goal), Granville
3 November 1999	Portsmouth	H	4-2	31,660	Whitley, G Taylor (2), Pollock
6 November 1999	Queens Park Rangers	A	1-1	19,002	Horlock
20 November 1999	Charlton Athletic	A	1-0	20,043	Goater
24 November 1999	Barnsley	H	3-1	32,692	G Taylor, Goater, Horlock
27 November 1999	Huddersfield Town	H	0-1	32,936	
3 December 1999	Wolverhampton Wanderers	A	1-4	21,635	Goater
7 December 1999	Stockport County	H	1-2	32,686	Wiekens
18 December 1999	Swindon Town	H	3-0	31,751	Pollock, R Taylor, Goater
26 December 1999	West Bromwich Albion	A	2-0	19,589	Granville, Goater
28 December 1999	Grimsby Town	H	2-1	32,607	Horlock (2)
3 January 2000	Crewe Alexandra	A	1-1	10,066	Crooks
16 January 2000	Fulham	H	4-0	30,057	Goater (3), Horlock (pen)
22 January 2000	Sheffield United	A	0-1	23,862	
5 February 2000	Nottingham Forest	A	3-1	25,846	R Taylor, Goater (2)
12 February 2000	Norwich City	H	3-1	32,681	Goater, Kennedy (2)
18 February 2000	Huddersfield Town	A	1-1	18,173	Goater
26 February 2000	Walsall	H	1-1	32,438	Goater
4 March 2000	Crystal Palace	A	1-1	21,052	R Taylor
8 March 2000	Queens Park Rangers	H	1-3	31,353	Whitley
11 March 2000	Barnsley	A	1-2	22,650	Goater
19 March 2000	Charlton Athletic	H	1-1	32,139	Goater
21 March 2000	Stockport County	A	2-2	11,212	Pollock, Jobson
25 March 2000	West Bromwich Albion	H	2-1	32,072	Kennedy, Goater
1 April 2000	Swindon Town	A	2-0	12,397	Goater, Kennedy
5 April 2000	Bolton Wanderers	H	2-0	32,927	Horlock, Dickov
8 April 2000	Crewe Alexandra	H	4-0	32,433	Prior, Dickov (2), Kennedy
15 April 2000	Grimsby Town	A	1-1	8,166	Prior
22 April 2000	Tranmere Rovers	H	2-0	32,842	Goater, Whitley
24 April 2000	Portsmouth	A	2-2	19,015	Prior, R Taylor
28 April 2000	Birmingham City	H	1-0	32,062	R Taylor
7 May 2000	Blackburn Rovers	A	4-1	29,913	Goater, Dailly (own goal), Kennedy, Dickov

=== FA Cup ===
Round	Date	Opponent	Venue	Result	Attendance	Goalscorers
R3	12 December 1999	Chester City	A	4-1	5,469	Goater (2), Bishop, Doughty (own goal)
R4	9 January 2000	Leeds United	H	2-5	29,240	Goater, Bishop

=== League Cup ===
Round	Date	Opponent	Venue	Result	Attendance	Goalscorers
R1 1st Leg	11 August 1999	Burnley	H	5-0	11,074	Goater, Kennedy (2), Horlock (pen), G Taylor
R1 2nd Leg	24 August 1999	Burnley	A	1-0 (won 6-0 on agg)	3,647	Cooke
R2 1st Leg	15 September 1999	Southampton	H	0-0	17,476	
R2 2nd Leg	21 September 1999	Southampton	A	3-4 (lost 3-4 on agg)	10,960	Dickov, Goater (2)

== Squad ==
Note: Flags indicate national team as defined under FIFA eligibility rules; some limited exceptions apply. Players may hold more than one non-FIFA nationality.

No.	Pos.	Nation	Player
1	GK	ENG	Nicky Weaver
2	DF	ENG	Lee Crooks
3	DF	ENG	Richard Edghill
4	DF	NED	Gerard Wiekens
5	DF	SCO	Andy Morrison
6	MF	NIR	Kevin Horlock
7	DF	ENG	Spencer Prior
8	MF	ENG	Ian Bishop
9	FW	SCO	Paul Dickov
10	FW	BER	Shaun Goater
11	MF	ENG	Terry Cooke
12	FW	AUS	Danny Allsopp
13	GK	NIR	Tommy Wright
14	FW	WAL	Gareth Taylor
15	FW	ENG	Craig Russell
16	MF	ENG	Jamie Pollock
17	MF	NIR	Jim Whitley
18	MF	NIR	Jeff Whitley

No.	Pos.	Nation	Player
19	MF	AUS	Danny Tiatto
20	MF	SCO	Gary Mason
22	DF	ENG	Nick Fenton
24	FW	SCO	Lee Peacock
25	DF	ENG	Richard Jobson
26	GK	NIR	Richard McKinney
27	DF	NIR	Shaun Holmes
28	MF	ENG	Tony Grant
29	MF	ENG	Shaun Wright-Phillips
30	GK	ENG	Steven Hodgson
31	MF	ENG	David Laycock
32	MF	ENG	Leon Mike
33	FW	NZL	Chris Killen
34	DF	IRL	Mark Kennedy
35	FW	ENG	Lee Mills (on loan from Bradford City)
36	DF	ENG	Danny Granville
37	FW	ENG	Robert Taylor

=== Left club during season ===
Note: Flags indicate national team as defined under FIFA eligibility rules; some limited exceptions apply. Players may hold more than one non-FIFA nationality.

No.	Pos.	Nation	Player
7	MF	ENG	Michael Brown (to Sheffield United)
21	DF	ENG	Tony Vaughan (to Nottingham Forest)
23	DF	GEO	Kakhaber Tskhadadze (released)

No.	Pos.	Nation	Player
24	DF	GEO	Murtaz Shelia (released)
28	FW	IRL	Alan Reilly (to Halifax Town)
35	FW	ENG	Chris Greenacre (to Mansfield Town)

=== Reserve squad ===
Note: Flags indicate national team as defined under FIFA eligibility rules; some limited exceptions apply. Players may hold more than one non-FIFA nationality.

No.	Pos.	Nation	Player
-	DF	WAL	Rhys Day
-	DF	ENG	Stephen Jordan
-	MF	CAN	Terry Dunfield

No.	Pos.	Nation	Player
-	MF	NGA	Dickson Etuhu
-	MF	ENG	Chris Shuker
