= List of Maidstone United F.C. seasons =

This is a list of seasons played by Maidstone United in English football. It covers the period from the club's formation to the end of the last completed season. Where available it details the club's achievements in all competitions, together with the top scorers and the average attendances for each season.

== Seasons ==
=== 1993–2000 ===
Information from 1993–2000 is scarce due to lack of available sources.

Season	League		Competitions won or runners up	
Season	Division	Pos	Competitions won or runners up	
1993–94	KCL4	1st	West Kent Challenge Shield	W
1993–94	KCL4	1st	Tunbridge Wells Charity Cup	W
1994–95	KCL2 (Note: The club was promoted from Division 4 to Division 2 in the 1994 close season due to league restructuring.)	1st	West Kent Challenge Shield	RU
1994–95	KCL2	1st	Kent Junior Cup	W
1995–96	KCL1	7th	none	-
1996–97	KCL1	11th	none	-
1997–98	KCL1	8th	none	-
1998–99	KCL1	1st	West Kent Challenge Shield	W
1999–2000	KCLP	3rd	Weald of Kent Charity Cup	W

=== 2000–present ===
Season	League										FA Cup	FA Trophy	Kent Senior Cup	Other		Top goalscorer(s)		Supporters player of the year	Average attendance
Season	Division	P	W	D	L	F	A	GD	Pts	Pos	FA Cup	FA Trophy	Kent Senior Cup	Other		Name	Goals	Supporters player of the year	Average attendance
2000–01	KCLP	26	15	9	2	62	25	+37	54	3rd (Note: Straightforward promotion from the Kent County League to the Kent League was not possible, however Maidstone were now a senior club (they were not in the 1999–2000 season when they also finished 3rd) meaning they could apply for promotion to the Kent League, an application which was accepted.)	dne	dne	dne	Kent Senior Trophy	R1	Dave Forster	18	n/a	198
2000–01	KCLP	26	15	9	2	62	25	+37	54	3rd	dne	dne	dne	Inter-Regional Challenge Cup	R5	Dave Forster	18	n/a	198
2000–01	KCLP	26	15	9	2	62	25	+37	54	3rd	dne	dne	dne	Weald of Kent Charity Cup	W	Dave Forster	18	n/a	198
2001–02	KLP	30	20	6	4	72	32	+40	66	1st (Note: Maidstone could not attain promotion from the Kent League due to lease problems at the club's then-home at Central Park, Sittingbourne.)	dne	dne	dne	FA Vase	R2	Richard Sinden	25	n/a	298
2001–02	KLP	30	20	6	4	72	32	+40	66	1st	dne	dne	dne	Kent Senior Trophy	R2	Richard Sinden	25	n/a	298
2001–02	KLP	30	20	6	4	72	32	+40	66	1st	dne	dne	dne	Kent League Premier Division Cup	W	Richard Sinden	25	n/a	298
2002–03	KLP	30	18	9	3	76	31	+45	63	2nd (Note: Maidstone again could not attain promotion from the Kent League due to lease problems, this time at the club's new temporary home at Bourne Park, Sittingbourne.)	2QR	dne	dne	FA Vase	R1	Richard Sinden	n/a	n/a	352
2002–03	KLP	30	18	9	3	76	31	+45	63	2nd	2QR	dne	dne	Kent Senior Trophy	W	Richard Sinden	n/a	n/a	352
2002–03	KLP	30	18	9	3	76	31	+45	63	2nd	2QR	dne	dne	Kent League Premier Division Cup	n/a	Richard Sinden	n/a	n/a	352
2002–03	KLP	30	18	9	3	76	31	+45	63	2nd	2QR	dne	dne	Kent League Charity Shield	W	Richard Sinden	n/a	n/a	352
2003–04	KLP	32	19	10	3	71	30	+41	67	4th	3QR	dne	R1 (Note: The club gained entry to the Kent Senior Cup due to winning the Kent Senior Trophy the previous season.)	FA Vase	R3	Richard Sinden	31	n/a	255
2003–04	KLP	32	19	10	3	71	30	+41	67	4th	3QR	dne	R1	Kent League Premier Division Cup	SF	Richard Sinden	31	n/a	255
2003–04	KLP	32	19	10	3	71	30	+41	67	4th	3QR	dne	R1	Kent League Challenge Shield	W	Richard Sinden	31	n/a	255
2004–05	KLP	30	16	6	8	60	37	+23	54	4th	3QR	dne	dne	FA Vase	R2	Lynden Rowland; Richard Sinden	16	n/a	246
2004–05	KLP	30	16	6	8	60	37	+23	54	4th	3QR	dne	dne	Kent Senior Trophy	R2	Lynden Rowland; Richard Sinden	16	n/a	246
2004–05	KLP	30	16	6	8	60	37	+23	54	4th	3QR	dne	dne	Kent League Premier Division Cup	R2	Lynden Rowland; Richard Sinden	16	n/a	246
2005–06	KLP	30	22	6	2	84	23	+61	72	1st	1QR	dne	dne	FA Vase	R3	Mo Takaloo	44	Mario Celaire	336
2005–06	KLP	30	22	6	2	84	23	+61	72	1st	1QR	dne	dne	Kent Senior Trophy	R2	Mo Takaloo	44	Mario Celaire	336
2005–06	KLP	30	22	6	2	84	23	+61	72	1st	1QR	dne	dne	Kent League Premier Division Cup	W	Mo Takaloo	44	Mario Celaire	336
2006–07	ILS	42	23	11	8	79	47	+32	80	1st	1QR	2QR	SF	Isthmian League Cup	R2	Lynden Rowland	15	Nathan Paul	432
2006–07	ILS	42	23	11	8	79	47	+32	80	1st	1QR	2QR	SF	Kent League Challenge Shield	RU	Lynden Rowland	15	Nathan Paul	432
2007–08	ILP	42	16	4	22	56	79	−23	52	17th	2QR	3QR	R1	Isthmian League Cup	R3	Mo Takaloo	16	Nathan Paul	444
2008–09	ILP	42	14	11	17	46	51	−5	53	15th	4QR	2QR	QF	Isthmian League Cup	R2	James Pinnock; Lloyd Blackman	15	Andy Walker	388
2009–10	ILP	42	13	10	19	39	57	−18	49	18th	3QR	2R	QF	Isthmian League Cup	R3	James Pinnock	10	Peter Hawkins	255
2010–11	ILP	42	9	10	23	43	75	−32	37	20th	1QR	3QR	R1	Isthmian League Cup	R2	Danny Hockton	15	Andy Walker	311
2011–12	ILS	40 (Note: 41 games played but result against Croydon Athletic was expunged after the club went out of business.)	20	7	13	68	50	+18	67	6th	2QR	PRE	R2	Isthmian League Cup	QF	Shaun Welford	31	Tom Mills	377
2012–13	ILS	42	26	10	6	96	39	+49	88	2nd	3QR	R2	R2	Isthmian League Cup	R4	Paul Booth	20	Alex Flisher	1698
2013–14	ILP	46	23	12	11	92	57	+35	81	7th	3QR	3QR	QF	Isthmian League Cup	W	Frannie Collin	23	Lee Worgan	1821
2014–15	ILP	46	29	11	6	85	41	+44	98	1st	R2	2QR	QF	Isthmian League Cup	QF	Frannie Collin; Jay May	23	James Rogers	1846
2015–16	NLS	42	24	5	13	55	40	+15	77	3rd	R1	R1	R2	None	N/a	Jay May	11	Jamie Coyle	2208
2016–17	NLP	46	16	10	20	59	75	−16	58	14th	R1	R1	R1	None	N/a	Jamar Loza; Bobby-Joe Taylor	9	Stuart Lewis	2386
2017–18	NLP	46	13	15	18	52	64	−12	54	19th	R2	R3	W	None	N/a	Joe Pigott	12	Alex Finney	2412
2018–19	NLP	46	9	7	30	37	82	-45	34	24th	R2	R4	W	None	N/a	Blair Turgott	15	Michael Phillips	2179
2019–20	NLS	33	12	9	12	48	44	+4	45	9th (Note: The 2019–20 season was curtailed due to the COVID-19 pandemic, with league positions decided on a points-per-game basis.)	3QR	R1	R2	None	N/a	TBA	TBA	TBA	TBA
2020–21	NLS	13	5	4	4	24	18	+6	19	11th (Note: The 2020–21 National League South season was declared null and void and results expunged due to the COVID-19 pandemic.)	3QR	R5	n/a	None	N/a	TBA	TBA	TBA	TBA
2021–2022	NLS	40	27	6	7	79	38	+41	87	1st	4QR	R6	n/a	None	N/a	Joan Luque	22	TBA	TBA
2022–2023	NLP	46	5	10	31	45	104	-59	25	24th	4QR	QF	n/a	n/a	N/a	Jack Barham	9	TBA	TBA
2023–24	NLS	46	24	11	11	72	52	20	83	7th	R5	R3	W	n/a	n/a	Matt Rush	15	TBA	TBA

== Key ==
Champions	Runners-up	Promoted	Play-offs	Relegated

Division shown in bold to indicate a change in division.
Top scorer is for all competitive matches.
Average attendance is for all home league matches.

Key to league record:

- P = Played
- W = Games won
- D = Games drawn
- L = Games lost
- F = Goals for
- A = Goals against
- GD = Goal difference
- Pts = Points
- Pos = Final position

Key to divisions:

- NLP = National League
- NLS = National League South
- ILP = Isthmian League Premier Division
- ILS = Isthmian League Division One South
- KLP = Kent League Premier Division
- KCLP = Kent County League Premier Division
- KCL1 = Kent County League Division One
- KCL2 = Kent County League Division Two
- KCL4 = Kent County League Division Four

Key to rounds:

- dne = Did not enter
- PRE = Preliminary round
- 1QR = 1st qualifying round
- 2QR = 2nd qualifying round
- 3QR = 3rd qualifying round
- 4QR = 4th qualifying round
- R1 = Round 1
- R2 = Round 2
- QF = Quarter-finals
- SF = Semi-finals
- RU = Runners-up
- W = Winners
