= KK Opara =

Nigerian footballer (born 1981)

Personal information
- Full name: Kelechi Chrystantus Opara
- Date of birth: 21 December 1981 (age 44)
- Place of birth: Owerri, Nigeria
- Height: 5 ft 10 in (1.78 m)
- Position: Forward

Youth career
- Colchester United

Senior career*
Years	Team	Apps	(Gls)
1998–2000	Colchester United	19	(0)
2000–2002	Leyton Orient	6	(0)
2001	→ Dagenham & Redbridge (loan)	4	(1)
2001–2002	→ Billericay Town (loan)		
- Billericay Town
2003	Dagenham & Redbridge	1	(0)
- Purfleet
- Redbridge
- Heybridge Swifts
- Erith & Belvedere
- Harlow Town
Total		30	(1)
- * Club domestic league appearances and goals

Kelechi Chrystantus "KK" Opara // (born 21 December 1981) is a Nigerian former footballer who played in the Football League as a forward for Colchester United and Leyton Orient. His younger brother Lloyd was also a professional footballer.

== Career ==
Born in Owerri, Nigeria, Opara came through the youth ranks at Colchester United where he made 19 league appearances for the club between 1998 and 2000. He made his debut for the club in a 2–1 defeat to Blackpool at Bloomfield Road on the final day of the 1998–99 season, coming on as a substitute in the 81st minute for Steve Germain.

Opara was a prolific goalscorer in the United youth and reserve teams, but could not find the same form in the Colchester first-team having been pushed into the first-team early following the success of former starlet Lomana LuaLua prior to his departure to Newcastle United. He was eventually released by the club following an act of misconduct while on his weekly academic day of his scholarship with the club. His last appearance in the first-team came in a 1–0 defeat by Stoke City at Layer Road on 30 September 2000, coming on as an early substitute for Tony Lock.

Leyton Orient picked up Opara's scholarship, paying Colchester a nominal compensation fee. He helped his team win the Youth Alliance Cup in 2001 at the Millennium Stadium in Cardiff. He was also loaned out to Dagenham & Redbridge and Billericay Town during his time with the O's, making four appearances and scoring once for the former. He made six appearances for the first-team whilst with the club, before being released in 2002.

Following a trial period with Darlington during pre-season for the 2002–03 season, Opara joined Billericay on a permanent basis. He later played for a number of non-league clubs, including a return to Dagenham & Redbridge, Purfleet, Redbridge, Heybridge Swifts.

While he was signed to Heybridge, Opara was involved in a serious car accident in March 2003 in which five people died. The accident occurred in North London on 15 March in the early hours of a Saturday morning when Opara was driving himself and four passengers in his Vauxhall Calibra when his car was struck by a speeding Vauxhall Omega. Three of his four passengers (two women aged 18 and a 20-year-old man) were killed in the accident, and both driver and passenger of the Omega were also killed. The incident left Opara in a serious but stable condition in hospital. He recovered from his injuries and resumed his playing career in 2004, appearing for Erith & Belvedere and Harlow Town.

== Personal life ==
Opara has a younger brother, Lloyd, who was also a scholar at Colchester United at the same time. Lloyd played six times for Colchester and also appeared for Cambridge United, Swindon Town and Peterborough United.
