= Stéphane Pounewatchy =

French footballer (born 1968)

Personal information
- Full name: Stéphane Zeusnagapa Pounewatchy
- Date of birth: 10 February 1968 (age 58)
- Place of birth: Paris, France
- Height: 1.83 m (6 ft 0 in)
- Position: Centre-back

Youth career
- 1985–1987: Sedan

Senior career*
Years	Team	Apps	(Gls)
1987–1989	AS Beaune		
1989–1995	Martigues	166	(7)
1995–1996	Gueugnon	30	(0)
1996–1998	Carlisle United	81	(3)
1998	Dundee	3	(0)
1998	Port Vale	2	(0)
1999	Colchester United	15	(1)
2000	Scunthorpe United	0	(0)
Total		297	(11)
- * Club domestic league appearances and goals

Stéphane Zeusnagapa Pounewatchy (born 10 February 1968) is a French former professional footballer who played as a centre-back in France, England and Scotland.

== Career ==
Pounewatchy played in his native France for Sedan from 1985 to 1987, suffering relegation from Ligue 2 in the 1985–86 season. In 1989, he returned to the second tier with Martigues and helped them to the Ligue 2 title and promotion to Ligue 1 in 1992–93. The club consolidated their top-flight status in 1993–94 and 1994–95, in part due to Didier Tholot's 13 league goals in both seasons. Pounewatchy spent the 1995–96 season with FC Gueugnon, though both Gueugnon and Martigues suffered relegation to Ligue 2.

Pounewatchy moved to England for the start of the 1996–97 season, where he was a permanent fixture in the Third Division Carlisle United team in both 1996–97 and 1997–98. The club celebrated promotion to the Second Division in the former season and relegation from it in the latter. He was named as man of the match as Carlisle won the 1997 Football League Trophy final at Wembley with a penalty shoot-out victory over Colchester United following a 0–0 draw.

Pounewatchy then briefly moved north to Scotland for the 1997–98 season, spending August with Dundee in the SPL, playing four games before joining Port Vale of the English Football League First Division on a monthly basis. He was only at Vale Park for September, playing just two games. On 20 February, he joined Colchester United, signing a contract to run for the rest of the season. He said: "I am very happy to be in the Second Division because when you are a professional footballer you want to play at the highest level you can." He played 15 games that season and was released on 8 May.

On 25 January 2000, he turned out for Scunthorpe United in a 2–1 defeat by Chesterfield at Glanford Park in the Football League Trophy.

== Career statistics ==
Appearances and goals by club, season and competition
Club	Season	League			National cup (Note: Includes Coupe de France, FA Cup, Scottish Cup)		Other		Total	
Club	Season	Division	Apps	Goals	Apps	Goals	Apps	Goals	Apps	Goals
Martigues	1989–90	Division 2	29	0	3	0	0	0	32	0
Martigues	1990–91	Division 2	31	0	1	0	0	0	32	0
Martigues	1991–92	Division 2	30	5	1	0	0	0	31	5
Martigues	1992–93	Division 2	32	0	3	1	0	0	35	1
Martigues	1993–94	Division 1	29	1	1	0	0	0	30	1
Martigues	1994–95	Division 1	15	1	3	0	0	0	18	1
Martigues	Total		166	7	12	1	0	0	178	8
Gueugnon	1995–96	Division 1	30	0	1	0	0	0	31	0
Carlisle United	1996–97	Third Division	42	1	4	0	11	1	57	2
Carlisle United	1997–98	Second Division	39	2	1	0	5	1	45	3
Carlisle United	Total		81	3	5	0	16	2	102	5
Dundee	1998–99	Scottish Premier League	3	0	0	0	1	0	4	0
Port Vale	1998–99	First Division	2	0	0	0	0	0	2	0
Colchester United	1998–99	Second Division	15	1	0	0	0	0	15	1
Scunthorpe United	1999–2000	Second Division	0	0	0	0	1	0	1	0
Total			297	11	18	1	18	2	333	14

== Honours ==
Martigues

- Ligue 2: 1992–93

Carlisle United

- Football League Third Division third-place promotion: 1996–97
- Football League Trophy: 1996–97
