= List of Maidstone United F.C. records and statistics =

This article details all-time records. For a season-by-season statistical breakdown see Maidstone United F.C. seasons

This list encompasses the records set by Maidstone United, their managers and their players.

== Club records ==
=== Firsts ===
Only first team games considered.

- First home match at Central Park, Sittingbourne: Maidstone United 11 Kingstonian XI (Friendly, 28 July 2001)
- First home match at Bourne Park, Sittingbourne: Maidstone United 0–5 Gillingham (Friendly, 20 July 2002)
- First home match at The Homelands, Ashford: Maidstone United 0–2 Accrington Stanley (Friendly, 11 July 2009)
- First home match at the Gallagher Stadium, Maidstone: Maidstone United 0–5 Brighton & Hove Albion (Friendly, 14 July 2012)
- First Kent County League match: Maidstone United 7–0 Scott Sports Reserves (Kent County League Division Four, August 1993)
- First Kent League match: Tunbridge Wells 1–1 Maidstone United (Kent League Premier Division, 11 August 2001)
- First Isthmian League match: Hastings United 0–2 Maidstone United (Isthmian League Division One South, 17 August 2006)
- First National League match: Sutton United 0–2 Maidstone United (National League South, 8 August 2015)
- First FA Cup match: Ramsgate 1–1 Maidstone United (24 August 2002)
- First FA Trophy match: Maidstone United 2–0 Bury Town (7 October 2007)
- First FA Vase match: Maidstone United 4–1 Carterton Town (9 September 2001)
- First Kent Senior Cup match: Maidstone United 0–3 Folkestone Invicta (17 December 2003)
- First Isthmian League Cup match: Maidstone United 0–3 Tonbridge Angels (12 September 2006)
- First Kent Senior Trophy match: Maidstone United 0–1 Snodland (7 October 2000)
- First Kent League Premier Division Cup match: Thamesmead Town 0–1 Maidstone United (24 November 2001)

=== Best league position and cup runs ===
- League position: National League, 14th (2016–17)
- FA Cup: 5th round (2023–24)
- FA Trophy: Quarter Final (replay) (2018–19)
- FA Vase: 3rd Round (replay) (2005–06)
- Kent Senior Cup: Winners (2017–18, 2018–19, 2023-24)
- Isthmian League Cup: Winners (2013–14)
- Kent Senior Trophy: Winners (2002–03)
- Kent League Premier Division Cup: Winners (2001–02, 2005–06)

=== Record Results ===
Only competitive first team games considered.

==== Victories ====
- Overall: 12–1 vs Aylesford - (Kent County League Division 4, 26 March 1994)
- National League: 1–4 vs Macclesfield Town, (16 September 2017)
- National League South: 8–0 vs Enfield Town, (24 February 2026)
- Isthmian League Premier Division: 7–2 vs Hampton & Richmond Borough, (25 January 2014)
- Isthmian League Division One South: 6–0 vs Corinthian-Casuals, (17 February 2007)
- Kent League Premier Division: 9–0 vs Sporting Bengal United, (8 April 2006)
- Kent County League: 12–1 vs Aylesford, (Division Four, 26 March 1994)
- FA Cup: 10–0 vs Littlehampton Town, (1st qualifying round, 13 September 2014)
- FA Trophy: 5–3 vs Abingdon United, (2nd qualifying round (replay), 7 November 2007)
- FA Vase: 4–0

vs AFC Totton, (2nd qualifying round, 26 September 2004)
vs North Leigh, (1st round, 29 October 2005)
vs Andover, (2nd round, 19 November 2005)

- Kent Senior Cup: 3–0 vs Sittingbourne, (1st round, 26 December 2006)
- Isthmian League Cup: 6–0

vs Grays Athletic, (Semi-final, 25 February 2014)
vs Herne Bay, (2nd round, 25 November 2014)

- Kent Senior Trophy: 6–0 vs Crockenhill, (round unknown, 30 November 2002)

==== Defeats ====
- Overall: 0–7 vs Chelmsford City - (Isthmian League Premier Division, 25 August 2007)
- National League South: 1-5 vs Worthing, (2023–24)

1-5 vs Chelmsford City, (2024–25)

- Isthmian League Premier Division: 0–7 vs Chelmsford City, (25 August 2007)
- Isthmian League Division One South: 1–5 vs Worthing, (17 December 2011)
- FA Cup: 0–5 vs Coventry City F.C., (5th round, 26th February 2024)
- FA Trophy: 1–3 :vs Ashford Town (Middlesex), (preliminary round, 8 October 2011)

vs Salisbury City, (2nd round, 30 January 2010)

- Isthmian League Cup: 0–3

vs Tonbridge Angels, (2nd round, 12 September 2006)
vs AFC Hornchurch, (3rd Round, 18 December 2007)
vs East Thurrock United, (quarter-final, 15 February 2012)

- Kent Senior Cup: 2–6 vs Ebbsfleet United, (2nd round, 24 November 2015)
- Kent Senior Trophy: 3–5 vs Ramsgate, (2nd round, 27 November 2004)

=== Highest attendances ===
- Overall: 4,175 vs Hampton & Richmond (National League South, 7 May 2022)
- At London Road, Maidstone (1993–2001): 320 vs Snodland (Kent County League Premier Division, 16 April 2001)
- At Central Park, Sittingbourne (2001–2002): 412 vs Ramsgate (Kent League Premier Division, 16 March 2002)
- At Bourne Park, Sittingbourne (2002–2009, 2011–2012): 1,719 vs AFC Wimbledon (FA Cup 4th qualifying round, 25 October 2008)
- At The Homelands, Ashford (2009–2011): 488 vs Folkestone Invicta (Isthmian League Premier Division, 25 April 2011)
- At the Gallagher Stadium, Maidstone (2012–): 4,175 vs Hampton & Richmond (National League South, 7 May 2022)
- National League (division): 3,409 vs Tranmere Rovers (29 April 2017)
- National League South: 4,175 vs Hampton & Richmond (7 May 2022)
- Isthmian League Premier Division: 2,296 vs Dulwich Hamlet (15 March 2014)
- Isthmian League Division One South: 2,305 vs Horsham (27 April 2013)
- Kent League Premier Division: 573 vs Beckenham Town (25 March 2006)
- FA Cup: 4,024 vs Stevenage (3rd round proper, 6 January 2024)
- FA Trophy: 1,571 vs Whitehawk (3rd qualifying round, 10 November 2012)
- FA Vase: 423 vs Andover (3rd Round, 19 November 2005)
- Kent Senior Cup: 1,612 vs Gillingham (Quarter-final, 16 January 2018)
- Isthmian League Cup: 831 vs Sittingbourne (1st round, 16 October 2012) - (A crowd of 1,829 was at the Gallagher Stadium for the 2013–14 Final between Maidstone United v AFC Sudbury on 8 April 2014 although this was deemed a neutral venue)
- Friendly: 4,101 vs Crystal Palace (15 July 2017)

== Managerial records ==
- First manager(s): Bill Tucker and Jack Whiteley (joint managers) - 1993–1996
- Longest serving manager(s): Lloyd Hume - May 2004 – February 2010 (282 matches)

== Player records ==
=== Appearances ===
- Appearance record: Tom Mills - 341

=== Transfer records ===
- Highest fee paid: £6,000 - Stuart King from Folkestone Invicta
- Highest fee received: £19,000 - Chris Smalling to Fulham
