= Ian Wiles =

English footballer

Personal information
- Full name: Ian Robert Wiles
- Date of birth: 28 April 1980 (age 46)
- Place of birth: Woodford, London, England
- Height: 6 ft 0 in (1.83 m)
- Position: Defender

Youth career
- Colchester United

Senior career*
Years	Team	Apps	(Gls)
1998–2001	Colchester United	1	(0)
2001	Heybridge Swifts		
2001–2003	Chelmsford City	83	(3)
- Welling United
- Heybridge Swifts
- Braintree Town
- AFC Hornchurch
- Heybridge Swifts
- * Club domestic league appearances and goals

Ian Robert Wiles (born 28 April 1980) is an English footballer who plays as a defender, most recently for Heybridge Swifts. Wiles has played in the Football League for Colchester United.

== Career ==
Born in Woodford, London, Wiles came through the youth ranks at Colchester United, performing well enough to earn a professional contract for the 1998–99 season. He made his only professional appearance as an 89th-minute substitute for Paul Abrahams in a 4–2 away win against Wrexham on 15 August 1998. Wiles made the bench a few more times but failed to break into the first-team under Mick Wadsworth and was released in 2001.

Wiles joined Heybridge Swifts for the first of three spells with the club in their Isthmian League Cup winning season of 2000–01. He later spent two years with Chelmsford City before a stint with Conference South side Welling United. He then returned to Heybridge for a second stint but left once again in May 2008, joining Braintree Town and AFC Hornchurch before returning for a final time to the Swifts in December 2008. He departed the club in February 2009.
