= Jeff Whitley =

Northern Irish footballer (born 1979)

Personal information
- Full name: Jeffrey Whitley
- Date of birth: 28 January 1979 (age 47)
- Place of birth: Ndola, Zambia
- Height: 5 ft 8 in (1.73 m)
- Position: Midfielder

Youth career
- 1989–1996: Manchester City

Senior career*
Years	Team	Apps	(Gls)
1996–2003	Manchester City	116	(6)
1999	→ Wrexham (loan)	9	(2)
2002	→ Notts County (loan)	6	(0)
2002–2003	→ Notts County (loan)	12	(0)
2003–2005	Sunderland	68	(2)
2005–2007	Cardiff City	34	(1)
2006	→ Stoke City (loan)	3	(0)
2007	→ Wrexham (loan)	11	(1)
2008	Wrexham	11	(0)
2009	Woodley Sports	7	(0)
2009–2010	Northwich Victoria	2	(0)
Total		279	(12)

International career^{‡}
1998–2000	Northern Ireland U21	17	(1)
1997–2005	Northern Ireland	20	(3)
- * Club domestic league appearances and goals as of 11:40, 8 April 2009 (UTC) ‡ National team caps and goals as of 22:35, 8 August 2008 (UTC)

Jeffrey Whitley (born 28 January 1979) is a former professional footballer who now works for the Professional Footballers Association as a player wellbeing executive.

As a player he was a midfielder who notably played in the Premier League for Manchester City. He also played in the Football League for Wrexham, Notts County, Cardiff City, Stoke City and Sunderland, as well as for non-league sides Woodley Sports, Northwich Victoria and Droylsden. Born in Zambia, he was the first black player to represent Northern Ireland, earning 20 caps.

== Club career ==
Whitley's career started at local club Brickfield Rangers. He was a product of the Manchester City youth scheme which he joined as a ten-year-old and began his club career as a trainee in 1996, making over 120 league and cup appearances for the first-team. He had a two-month loan spell at Wrexham in the 1998–99 season. and in March 2002, having fallen out of favour at Manchester City, joined Notts County on loan for the remainder of the 2001–02 season. He had a three-month loan spell at Notts County in the 2002–03 season, returning to Manchester City in January 2003 but was released by the club in March 2003 as he did not feature in manager Kevin Keegan's plans.

After a trial and impressing in pre-season, he signed a contract with Sunderland in August 2003. He made over 70 league and cup appearances for Sunderland, helping the club to the Football League Championship play-offs at the end of the 2003–04 season. In the play-off semi final against Crystal Palace, Whitley attempted a Panenka during the penalty shootout which was saved. Crystal Palace converted the following spot kick to defeat Sunderland and reach the play-off final. Whitley later helped Sunderland to the Football League Championship title in 2005. In July 2005, he joined Cardiff City on a free transfer and made 38 league and cup appearances for the club in the 2005–06 season, scoring once against Watford in the league. Whitley joined Stoke City on loan in August 2006 but made only four appearances in an unsuccessful loan spell. Cardiff made him available for transfer but he did not take up offers to talk with Millwall and Rotherham and joined Wrexham in February 2007 on loan for the remainder of the 2006–07 season. He scored the winning goal against Bristol Rovers in a 1–0 away victory in March 2007. He was released by Cardiff and signed for Wrexham on non-contract terms in January 2008 but was released by Wrexham in May 2008 following the club's relegation to the Football Conference. He joined Northern Premier League Division One North side Woodley Sports in an effort to gain match fitness, before signing for Northwich Victoria on 7 March 2009.

== International career ==
Despite being Zambian born, due to Whitley living in England since he was a child, he was eligible to, and played for the England under-17 team. As his father was born in Belfast, he was also eligible to play for Northern Ireland and made his debut for them in 1997, becoming the first black player to play for Northern Ireland.

== Personal life ==
His brother, Jim was also a professional footballer, with both brothers playing for Manchester City at the same time; Jeff wore his full name on the back of his shirt for a time to differentiate between the two, who also shared the same initials.

Whitley has spent time at the Sporting Chance clinic after becoming addicted to alcohol and drugs. It affected him greatly and said "at times I would just be praying just to die". Whitley previously worked as a car salesman in the Stockport area whilst training to become a qualified Counsellor. He now works for the Professional Footballers' Association.

== Career statistics ==
=== Club ===
Club	Season	League			FA Cup		League Cup		Other^{[A]}		Total	
Club	Season	Division	Apps	Goals	Apps	Goals	Apps	Goals	Apps	Goals	Apps	Goals
Manchester City	1996–97	First Division	23	1	0	0	1	0	0	0	24	1
Manchester City	1997–98	First Division	17	1	1	0	0	0	0	0	18	1
Manchester City	1998–99	Second Division	8	0	0	0	1	0	4	0	13	0
Manchester City	1999–2000	First Division	42	4	2	0	2	0	0	0	46	4
Manchester City	2000–01	Premier League	31	1	1	0	5	0	0	0	37	1
Manchester City	2001–02	First Division	2	0	0	0	0	0	0	0	2	0
Manchester City	Total		116	6	4	0	9	0	4	0	133	6
Wrexham (loan)	1998–99	Second Division	9	2	0	0	0	0	0	0	9	2
Notts County (loan)	2001–02	Second Division	6	0	0	0	0	0	0	0	6	0
Notts County (loan)	2002–03	Second Division	12	0	1	0	0	0	1	0	14	0
Notts County (loan)	Total		18	0	1	0	0	0	1	0	20	0
Sunderland	2003–04	First Division	33	2	5	0	2	0	2	0	42	2
Sunderland	2004–05	Championship	34	2	0	0	0	0	0	0	34	2
Sunderland	Total		67	4	6	0	2	0	2	0	76	4
Cardiff City	2005–06	Championship	34	1	1	0	3	0	0	0	38	1
Cardiff City	2006–07	Championship	0	0	0	0	0	0	0	0	0	0
Cardiff City	Total		34	1	1	0	3	0	0	0	38	1
Stoke City (loan)	2006–07	Championship	3	0	0	0	1	0	0	0	4	0
Wrexham	2006–07	League Two	11	1	0	0	0	0	0	0	11	1
Wrexham	2007–08	League Two	11	0	0	0	0	0	0	0	11	0
Wrexham	Total		22	1	0	0	0	0	0	0	22	1
Career Total			269	14	11	0	15	0	7	0	302	14

A. The "Other" column constitutes appearances and goals in the Football League Trophy and Football League play-offs.

=== International ===
National team	Year	Apps	Goals
Northern Ireland	1997	2	0
Northern Ireland	1998	1	0
Northern Ireland	1999	1	1
Northern Ireland	2000	2	0
Northern Ireland	2001	1	0
Northern Ireland	2003	1	0
Northern Ireland	2004	8	1
Northern Ireland	2005	4	0
Total		20	2

== Honours ==
Manchester City

- Football League Second Division play-offs: 1999

Sunderland

- Football League Championship: 2004–05
