= Fumaça (footballer, born 1976) =

Brazilian footballer

Personal information
- Full name: José Rodrigues Alves Antunes
- Date of birth: 15 July 1976 (age 50)
- Place of birth: Belém, Brazil
- Height: 1.83 m (6 ft 0 in)
- Position: Midfielder

Senior career*
Years	Team	Apps	(Gls)
199?–2004	Catuense	?	(1)
1998	→ Benfica (loan)	0	(0)
1998–1999	→ Birmingham City (loan)	0	(0)
1999	→ Colchester United (loan)	1	(0)
1999	→ Barnsley (loan)	0	(0)
1999	→ Crystal Palace (loan)	3	(0)
1999–2000	→ Newcastle United (loan)	5	(0)
2002	→ América (RJ) (loan)	?	(0)
2002	→ Caxias (loan)	?	(0)
2005	FK Drnovice	10	(1)
2006	Türkiyemspor Berlin	15	(2)
2006–2007	SC Paderborn	?	(?)
2007	SV Wilhelmshaven	10	(1)
2008	Türkiyemspor Berlin	7	(0)
- * Club domestic league appearances and goals

José Rodrigues Alves Antunes (born 15 July 1976), more commonly known as Fumaça, is a Brazilian former professional footballer who played as a midfielder in Brazil, England, Czech Republic and Germany.

== Career ==
Born in Belém, Fumaça began his career with Catuense,. In August 1998, he had a month loan spell at Benfica but he wanted to join an English club. Holding a Portuguese passport, he was allowed to take a year abroad on loans and the club would accept an offer of £500,000 for him.

=== English tour ===
In the end of 1998, Fumaça joined Birmingham City on a three-month loan with an option to stay on a permanent deal. He played in a friendly against Walsall and one reserve game against Leeds United, where he was substituted at the half-time. After the match, the club decided against signing him and ended his loan. In his next trial at Grimsby Town, he scored three goals in three matches and although the club wanted him to sign, he decided to take a new trial at Derby County, which was not successful. He underwent another unsuccessful trial with Watford. Fumaça then joined Second Division side Colchester United, making his debut in only the second ever TV pay-per-view game when Colchester hosted Manchester City. Colchester lost the game 1–0, but not before Fumaça was stretchered off injured after just 14 minutes following a collision with Andy Morrison.

After having his contract cancelled at Colchester United, he joined Barnsley but failed to play a single match and was also cut from the team after John Hendrie was sacked. Allowed to stay one more season abroad, Fumaça joined Crystal Palace where Mick Wadsworth, his coach at Colchester United, was appointed an assistant. He played in two League Cup matches and in three league matches. Since the club could not afford his permanent deal, his tenure at Palace lasted two weeks as Wadsworth left the club to become assistant at Newcastle United, who also took him on loan.

At Newcastle, Fumaça made five league appearances during his time at St James' Park, but was left out of future fixtures since the deal would be made permanent if he reached a certain number of appearances. After the end of 1999–2000 season, Fumaça returned to Brazil. He returned to Europe in March 2001 for a trial at Real Zaragoza, who look poised to sign him for the 2001–02 season. The deal was not completed and Fumaça also had a trial at Cambridge United, also without being signed.

=== Return to Brazil ===
In 2002, Fumaça joined América (RJ) and played in the 2002 Torneio Rio – São Paulo where his club finished in last place. At the competition, in a 4–1 loss against São Paulo, he conceded a penalty after fouling future 2007 FIFA Player of the Year Kaká. He also played at the 2002 Campeonato Carioca when América finished 11th of 12 teams. He then played at the Campeonato Baiano for Catuense, scoring against Cruzeiro (BA). Fumaça then joined Caxias for the 2002 Campeonato Brasileiro Série B. He later returned to Catuense and played against Bahia in the 2004 Campeonato Baiano.

=== Czech Republic and Germany ===
Fumaça left his home country once again in 2005 for Czech Republic influenced by his fiancée who had Czech ancestry. Having signed a one-year contract, Fumaça made ten appearances and scored once for FK Drnovice. In 2006, he had a trial at Górnik Łęczna where he played in a friendly match against Avia Świdnik but did not impress. Later, he was signed by German club Türkiyemspor Berlin, scoring twice in 15 appearances. A short stay with SC Paderborn 07 followed in the latter half of 2006 before he left early in 2007 and then moved to his third German club with SV Wilhelmshaven for the second half of the 2006–07 season, scoring one goal in ten league games. After a spell out of the game, Fumaça returned to Türkiyemspor for a final six-month stint and seven appearances before calling time on his career.
