= 1996–97 Carlisle United F.C. season =

Carlisle United F.C.
1996–97 season
- Chairman: Michael Knighton
- Manager: Mervyn Day
- Stadium: Brunton Park
- Third Division: 3rd (promoted)
- FA Cup: Fourth round
- League Cup: Second round
- Football League Trophy: Winners
- Average home league attendance: 5,440

For the 1996–97 season, Carlisle United F.C. competed in Football League Division Three.

== Results & fixtures ==
=== Football League Third Division ===
==== League table ====
| Pos | Team | Pld | W | D | L | GF | GA | GD | Pts | Promotion or relegation |
|---|---|---|---|---|---|---|---|---|---|---|
| 1 | Wigan Athletic (C, P) | 46 | 26 | 9 | 11 | 84 | 51 | +33 | 87 | Promotion to the Second Division |
| 2 | Fulham (P) | 46 | 25 | 12 | 9 | 72 | 38 | +34 | 87 | Promotion to the Second Division |
| 3 | Carlisle United (P) | 46 | 24 | 12 | 10 | 67 | 44 | +23 | 84 | Promotion to the Second Division |
| 4 | Northampton Town (O, P) | 46 | 20 | 12 | 14 | 67 | 44 | +23 | 72 | Qualification for the Third Division play-offs |
| 5 | Swansea City | 46 | 21 | 8 | 17 | 62 | 58 | +4 | 71 | Qualification for the Third Division play-offs |

Rules for classification: In the Football League goals scored (GF) takes precedence over goal difference (GD).
(C) Champions; (O) Play-off winners; (P) Promoted

==== Matches ====
| Match Day | Date | Opponent | H/A | Score | Carlisle United Scorer(s) | Attendance |
|---|---|---|---|---|---|---|
| 1 | 17 August | Doncaster Rovers | A | 1–0 | | 3,003 |
| 2 | 24 August | Hull City | H | 0–0 | | 5,407 |
| 3 | 27 August | Leyton Orient | H | 1–0 | | 4,973 |
| 4 | 31 August | Fulham | A | 0–1 | | 5,860 |
| 5 | 7 September | Swansea City | H | 4–1 | | 5,114 |
| 6 | 10 September | Hartlepool United | A | 2–1 | | 3,077 |
| 7 | 14 September | Scarborough | A | 1–1 | | 3,524 |
| 8 | 21 September | Darlington | H | 1–0 | | 5,701 |
| 9 | 28 September | Torquay United | A | 2–1 | | 2,435 |
| 10 | 1 October | Colchester United | H | 3–0 | | 4,089 |
| 11 | 5 October | Mansfield Town | H | 1–1 | | 5,509 |
| 12 | 12 October | Rochdale | A | 2–2 | | 3,320 |
| 13 | 15 October | Exeter City | A | 1–2 | | 2,155 |
| 14 | 19 October | Cardiff City | H | 0–2 | | 4,972 |
| 15 | 26 October | Barnet | A | 0–0 | | 2,422 |
| 16 | 29 October | Chester City | H | 3–1 | | 4,187 |
| 17 | 2 November | Wigan Athletic | H | 0–3 | | 6,235 |
| 18 | 9 November | Northampton Town | A | 1–1 | | 4,682 |
| 19 | 19 November | Cambridge United | H | 3–0 | | 3,839 |
| 20 | 23 November | Brighton and Hove Albion | A | 3–1 | | 4,155 |
| 21 | 30 November | Barnet | H | 2–1 | | 4,472 |
| 22 | 3 December | Lincoln City | A | 1–1 | | 2,033 |
| 23 | 14 December | Hereford United | A | 3–2 | | 1,855 |
| 24 | 21 December | Scunthorpe United | H | 3–2 | | 5,646 |
| 25 | 26 December | Hartlepool United | H | 2–1 | | 6,947 |
| 26 | 28 December | Swansea City | A | 1–0 | | 7,340 |
| 27 | 18 January | Colchester United | A | 1–1 | | 3,588 |
| 28 | 1 February | Northampton Town | H | 2–1 | | 5,271 |
| 29 | 8 February | Wigan Athletic | A | 0–1 | | 6,195 |
| 30 | 11 February | Scarborough | H | 1–0 | | 4,936 |
| 31 | 15 February | Brighton and Hove Albion | H | 2–1 | | 5,465 |
| 32 | 21 February | Cambridge United | A | 3–1 | | 4,294 |
| 33 | 25 February | Chester City | A | 1–1 | | 2,750 |
| 34 | 1 March | Lincoln City | H | 1–0 | | 4,958 |
| 35 | 4 March | Torquay United | H | 5–1 | | 4,680 |
| 36 | 8 March | Scunthorpe United | A | 0–0 | | 3,470 |
| 37 | 15 March | Hereford United | H | 2–3 | | 5,063 |
| 38 | 22 March | Hull City | A | 1–0 | | 3,847 |
| 39 | 29 March | Doncaster Rovers | H | 0–0 | | 6,551 |
| 40 | 31 March | Leyton Orient | A | 1–2 | | 4,604 |
| 41 | 5 April | Fulham | H | 1–2 | | 9,171 |
| 42 | 8 April | Darlington | A | 1–2 | | 4,184 |
| 43 | 11 April | Mansfield Town | A | 0–0 | | 4,375 |
| 44 | 26 April | Cardiff City | A | 0–2 | | 5,178 |
| 45 | 29 April | Rochdale | H | 3–2 | | 4,882 |
| 46 | 3 May | Exeter City | H | 2–0 | | 6,170 |

=== Football League Cup ===
| Round | Date | Opponent | H/A | Score | Carlisle United Scorer(s) | Attendance |
|---|---|---|---|---|---|---|
| R1 L1 | 20 August | Chester City | H | 1-0 | | 4,042 |
| R1 L2 | 3 September | Chester City | A | 3–1 | | 1,947 |
| R2 L1 | 17 September | Port Vale | A | 0–1 | | 3,505 |
| R2 L2 | 24 September | Port Vale | H | 2–2 | | 5,545 |

=== FA Cup ===
| Round | Date | Opponent | H/A | Score | Carlisle United Scorer(s) | Attendance |
|---|---|---|---|---|---|---|
| R1 | 16 November | Shepshed Dynamo | H | 6–0 | | 4,394 |
| R2 | 7 December | Darlington | H | 1–0 | | 5,625 |
| R3 | 14 January | Tranmere Rovers | H | 1–0 | | 10,090 |
| R4 | 25 January | Sheffield Wednesday | H | 0–2 | | 16,104 |

=== Football League Trophy ===
| Round | Date | Opponent | H/A | Score | Carlisle United Scorer(s) | Attendance |
|---|---|---|---|---|---|---|
| R1 | 10 December | Rochdale | H | 2–0 | | 3,622 |
| R2 | 28 January | Hull City | H | 4–0 | | 3,716 |
| QF | 4 February | York City | A | 2–0 | | 1,922 |
| SF | 18 February | Shrewsbury Town | A | 2–1 | | 2,774 |
| F L1 (North) | 18 March | Stockport County | H | 2–0 | | 7,057 |
| F L2 (North) | 25 March | Stockport County | A | 0–0 | | 8,593 |
| F | 20 April | Colchester United | N | 0–0 (Carlisle won 4-3 on penalties) | | 45,077 |
