= Shaun Goater =

Bermudian footballer (born 1970)

Shaun Goater MBE
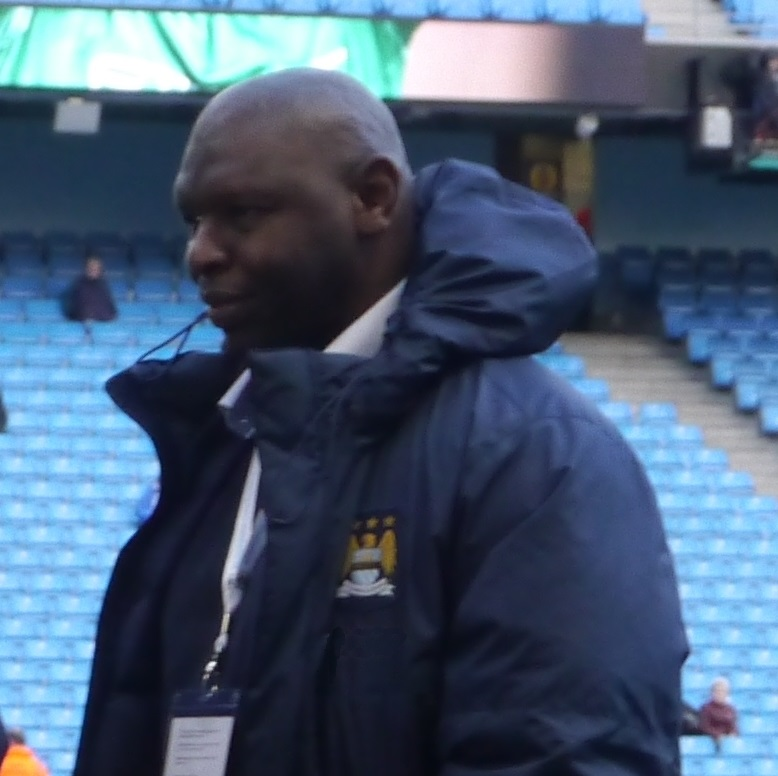
- Goater in 2015

Personal information
- Full name: Leonard Shaun Goater
- Date of birth: 25 February 1970 (age 56)
- Place of birth: Hamilton, Bermuda
- Height: 1.82 m (6 ft 0 in)
- Position: Striker

Youth career
- 1978–1985: North Village
- 1985–1986: Boulevard
- 1986–1987: North Village
- 1988–1989: Manchester United

Senior career*
Years	Team	Apps	(Gls)
1989	Manchester United	0	(0)
1989–1996	Rotherham United	209	(70)
1993	→ Notts County (loan)	1	(0)
1996–1998	Bristol City	75	(40)
1998–2003	Manchester City	184	(84)
2003–2005	Reading	43	(12)
2005	→ Coventry City (loan)	6	(0)
2005–2006	Southend United	34	(11)
2007–2008	Bermuda Hogges	9	(3)
2008–2010	North Village Rams	7	(1)
Total		567	(221)

International career
1987–2004	Bermuda	22	(20)

Managerial career
- 2008–2013: North Village Rams
- 2017: Ilkeston
- 2024–2025: Aston Villa Women (caretaker)
- * Club domestic league appearances and goals

Leonard Shaun Goater (born 25 February 1970) is a Bermudian former professional footballer, coach and pundit.

As a player he was a striker for a number of English clubs in the 1990s and 2000s. Goater's first professional club was Manchester United, but he did not reach the first team, making his League debut in 1989 after moving to Rotherham United. He played for Rotherham for seven years before moving to Bristol City in 1996. Two years later he moved to Manchester City for a fee of £400,000.

He is most well known for his time at Manchester City, where he scored over 100 goals between 1998 and 2003, finishing as the club's top scorer for four consecutive seasons. After leaving City, Goater had spells with Reading, Coventry City and Southend United, before retiring in May 2006. He represented Bermuda 36 times, scoring 32 goals.

== Early life ==
Goater was born in the Bermudian capital Hamilton, living with his mother Lynette, his grandmother and two aunts. His introduction to English football came in April 1987 when he was invited to join the Saltus Grammar School football and basketball tour. He spent two weeks playing against various English high school teams, including the Leicester City youth team. At the age of 17, he left home to further his education in the United States, where he had a soccer scholarship at Columbia High School, New Jersey. Whilst home in Bermuda during his Thanksgiving break, Goater was spotted by scouts from Manchester United, who invited him to England for a trial. With encouragement from his mother, who was a former football player herself, Goater accepted, forfeiting his scholarship by doing so. At this time, Goater did not play as a striker, but instead played as a creative midfielder.

== Club career ==
=== Early career ===
Goater's trial resulted in the offer of a professional contract, but he did not break into the first team. In 1989, Goater signed for Rotherham United in order to play first team football. At this time, Goater suffered homesickness, finding it difficult to adapt to the English climate: "It took me a good two years to get used to life in England. At first I thought the sun never shone and it wasn't for me." However, he gradually got used to living in England, and over the course of seven seasons at Rotherham he gained a reputation as a reliable lower division striker, scoring 86 goals in 262 appearances, with a winner's medal for the 1996 Football League Trophy the highlight. A 1992 League Cup tie against Everton gave Goater his first experience of playing against a Premier League team. In the first leg, Goater scored the only goal of the game as Rotherham won 1–0. However, Everton won the return leg 3–0 and Rotherham were eliminated. In 1993, Goater also had a brief loan spell at Notts County, though he made only one appearance for the Nottingham club due to a work permit problem. Towards the end of the 1995–96 season, Goater had a disagreement with Rotherham manager Archie Gemmill, and decided his future lay elsewhere.

In the 1995–96 close season, Goater received offers from Spanish club Osasuna and newly formed South Koreans Suwon Samsung Bluewings, but having recently married, he decided to stay in England. Shortly after, he moved to Bristol City for a fee of £175,000. Goater's Bristol City debut came against Gillingham. Goater scored, but Bristol City lost 3–2. City finished the season in fifth, qualifying for the playoffs, but lost to Brentford. The following season Bristol City were pushing for promotion into the First Division, and Goater scored regularly, eventually being named in the PFA Team of the Year for the division. In a little under two years with Bristol City, he scored 45 goals in 81 appearances. On 26 March 1998, transfer deadline day, Goater signed for Manchester City, who paid Bristol City £400,000 for his services.

=== Manchester City ===
Goater joined Manchester City at a turbulent point in their history, with newly appointed manager Joe Royle battling to save the club from relegation to the Second Division. Goater scored three goals in the seven remaining matches of the 1997–98 season, but this was not enough to prevent the club from being relegated to the third tier of English Football for the first time ever. Fans were initially sceptical as to Goater's ability, but as goals were scored supporters were gradually won over, creating a song in his honour, "Feed The Goat And He Will Score" (to the tune Cwm Rhondda). The 1998–99 season saw Goater score 21 goals, finishing the season as Manchester City's top goalscorer. The last of these was the winning goal in a play-off semi-final against Wigan Athletic, sending Manchester City to Wembley Stadium for a playoff final which saw City promoted after a penalty shootout.

The 1999–2000 season was even more successful for Goater. He was the club's top goal scorer again, this time with 29 goals, and was named Manchester City's Player of the Year by the supporters after Manchester City were promoted for the second successive year. In the summer, Goater was awarded the freedom of Bermuda, with 21 June declared as "Shaun Goater Day" on the island. The following season, Goater made his first appearance in top flight football at the age of 30, though injury and the presence of new signings Paulo Wanchope and former World Player of the Year George Weah meant he had to wait three months to do so. Again established in the first team, Goater was Manchester City's top goalscorer for the third consecutive season, but his 11 goals could not save the team from relegation.

During the 2000–01 season, upheaval took place at Manchester City, with manager Royle departing to be replaced by Kevin Keegan. Goater was the club's top scorer with 11 goals in all competitions but not save the club from relegation back to the First Division. In the 2001–02 season, Goater became the first Manchester City player since Francis Lee in 1972 to score more than 30 goals in a season. City were promoted as champions, and he was the club's top scorer for the fourth time in a row, as well as being the top scorer in the division.

Over the summer of 2001–02, there was speculation that Goater would be transferred, as Manchester City had twice broken their transfer record by buying strikers Jon Macken and Nicolas Anelka. Goater stayed, but opportunities were limited. He started just 14 games, but scored seven goals, including his 100th for the club, which came in a derby match against local rivals Manchester United. In February 2003, Goater struck against the same opposition to score the fastest goal by a substitute in Premier League history, just 9 seconds after coming onto the pitch. He also scored a goal that would have won City the match, but it was disallowed.

Shortly before the end of the 2002–03 season, Goater announced his intention to leave Manchester City when the season finished in order to seek regular first team football. In his final match for Manchester City, he was asked to captain the side in Manchester City's final game at Maine Road. In total, Goater scored 103 goals in 212 appearances for Manchester City. Since ending his footballing career, Goater has been critical of both Kevin Keegan, who he claims never praised him, and Nicolas Anelka, who he feels wanted to be 'the daddy' of Manchester City.

=== Later career ===
Goater moved to Reading on 1 August 2003. Reading chairman John Madejski described the transfer as "the biggest in Reading Football Club's history", but Goater's time there was not a happy one. Shortly after Goater's arrival, Reading manager Alan Pardew left for West Ham United, and Pardew's replacement, Steve Coppell, did not regard Goater as part of his plans. In his second and final season at Reading, Goater played just four times, and was loaned to Coventry City. Goater then considered retirement, but instead moved to League One club Southend United for a final season as a professional. The move, a free transfer, was completed on 3 August 2005. At Southend, Goater acted as a mentor for young striker Freddy Eastwood, and contributed towards a second successive promotion for the Shrimpers, scoring 11 goals. His final appearance before retirement was on 6 May 2006, when Southend played Bristol City, one of Goater's former clubs. The crowd included an estimated 400 Manchester City fans who travelled to Southend to mark the occasion.

Goater and three other partners in the Bermuda-based East End Group Limited announced an amalgamation with Telecommunications Networks Limited (now renamed East End Telecom) on 9 November 2007, which added to the group's two other business subsidiaries, East End Asphalt and East End Aviation. Goater serves as the group's Business Development Manager.

When in England, Goater has made regular appearances in local media covering the Manchester area. These have included a column entitled "Read the Goat" in the official Manchester City match programme, and a regular guest spot on the BBC Radio Manchester programme Blue Tuesday.

== International career ==
Goater has also played for the Bermudian national team 22 times, scoring 20 goals though due to Bermuda's lowly standing in world football he never played in a major international tournament. He made his first international appearance at the age of 17 against Canada. Other sources list him with 36 appearances, scoring 32 goals.

During the 1992–93 season, Goater missed eight weeks of the club season in order to represent his country in qualifying for the 1994 World Cup. However, Bermuda finished bottom of a group containing El Salvador, Canada and Jamaica. His final appearance was in June 2004 against El Salvador.

When playing for Bermuda, Goater was often the only professional player in the team. Bermudian journalist Chris Gibbons described the difference between Goater and his teammates: "He's a class above every other player on the island. Before he went to England he was just quick, but now he's a totally different player, a lot more aggressive and a much better header of the ball. The problem has been that he sets up chances for the others without them being on the same wavelength." However, Goater noted that this had a detrimental aspect: "My fitness dropped off while I was with Bermuda. It was like being on holiday. The team just ate what they liked. I kept to my professional diet for about two or three weeks until peer pressure took over."

=== International goals ===
Scores and results list Bermuda's goal tally first, score column indicates score after each Goater goal.

List of international goals scored by Shaun Goater
No.	Date	Venue	Opponent	Score	Result	Competition	Ref.
1	13 April 1989	Bermuda National Stadium, Hamilton, Bermuda	Barbados	2–1	2–1	Daily Nation Trophy	
2	13 May 1990	Mindoo Phillip Park, Castries, Saint Lucia	Saint Lucia	1–0	2–0	1990 Caribbean Cup qualification	
3	13 May 1990	Mindoo Phillip Park, Castries, Saint Lucia	Saint Lucia	2–0	2–0	1990 Caribbean Cup qualification	
4	26 May 1990	Bermuda National Stadium, Hamilton, Bermuda	Barbados	1–1	1–1	1990 Caribbean Cup qualification	
5	29 May 1990	Bermuda National Stadium, Hamilton, Bermuda	Barbados	1–0	3–0	1990 Caribbean Cup qualification	
6	29 May 1990	Bermuda National Stadium, Hamilton, Bermuda	Barbados	2–0	3–0	1990 Caribbean Cup qualification	
7	29 May 1990	Bermuda National Stadium, Hamilton, Bermuda	Barbados	3–0	3–0	1990 Caribbean Cup qualification	
8	4 February 1992	Bermuda National Stadium, Hamilton, Bermuda	Norway	1–3	1–3	Friendly	
9	26 April 1992	Bermuda National Stadium, Hamilton, Bermuda	Haiti	1–0	1–0	1994 FIFA World Cup qualification	
10	25 May 1992	Stade Sylvio Cator, Port-au-Prince, Haiti	Haiti	1–0	1–2	1994 FIFA World Cup qualification	
11	4 July 1992	Bermuda National Stadium, Hamilton, Bermuda	Antigua and Barbuda	1–1	2–1	1994 FIFA World Cup qualification	
12	4 July 1992	Bermuda National Stadium, Hamilton, Bermuda	Antigua and Barbuda	2–1	2–1	1994 FIFA World Cup qualification	
13	1 November 1992	Estadio Cuscatlán, San Salvador, El Salvador	El Salvador	1–4	1–4	1994 FIFA World Cup qualification	
14	8 November 1992	Independence Park, Kingston, Jamaica	Jamaica	2–2	2–3	1994 FIFA World Cup qualification	
15	15 November 1992	Swangard Stadium, Burnaby, Canada	Canada	1–3	2–4	1994 FIFA World Cup qualification	
16	5 March 2000	Sherly Ground, Road Town, British Virgin Islands	British Virgin Islands	3–0	5–1	2002 FIFA World Cup qualification	
17	5 March 2000	Sherly Ground, Road Town, British Virgin Islands	British Virgin Islands	4–0	5–1	2002 FIFA World Cup qualification	
18	5 March 2000	Sherly Ground, Road Town, British Virgin Islands	British Virgin Islands	5–1	5–1	2002 FIFA World Cup qualification	
19	31 March 2004	Bermuda National Stadium, Hamilton, Bermuda	Nicaragua	1–0	3–0	Friendly	
20	31 March 2004	Bermuda National Stadium, Hamilton, Bermuda	Nicaragua	2–0	3–0	Friendly	

== Coaching career ==
After retiring, Goater returned to Bermuda, receiving an official welcome from the Premier of Bermuda Alex Scott on his arrival. A week later, Southend played the Bermuda national team in an appreciation game for their former striker. Goater has expressed a wish to enter coaching following his retirement, and studied for the UEFA B coaching licence in 2005. Since 2003, Goater has organised the annual Shaun Goater Grass-roots Soccer Festival, a football coaching event for children in Bermuda. On 14 September 2006, Goater and the United Soccer Leagues announced that Bermuda would receive a professional football team that would play in the third division of American football, the USL Second Division. Goater had roles as both a director and player of the team, the Bermuda Hogges.

Goater left Bermuda Hogges in 2008, to concentrate on youth coaching with North Village Rams in his home town. He was appointed as the head coach in 2008. He served as the head coach of the Rams from 2008 to 2013, in the process winning seven trophies, including the league, three Friendship titles, Charity Cup and two Dudley Eve titles.

On 8 August 2015, it was announced that Goater would join Northern Premier League Division One North club New Mills as assistant manager to Andy Fearn. In September 2015, Fearn and Goater resigned from New Mills after nine defeats in nine games.

On 17 February 2017, Goater was appointed manager of Northern Premier League Division One North club Ilkeston.

On 5 February 2019, Macclesfield Town announced that they had hired Goater to the staff of their under-18s team.

On 8 October 2021, Goater returned to Manchester City as part of the academy coaching staff. He joined his former club's Academy coaching staff as part of the Premier League's Coach Inclusion & Diversity Scheme (CIDS), a programme set up with the aim of increasing the number of Black, Asian and mixed heritage coaches working full-time in professional football. Goater was set to work across all the club's Academy age groups, from the foundation phase up to the professional development phase, in different roles to ensure the provision of a wide range of experience.

In April 2023, Goater joined Manchester City W.F.C. as assistant to manager Gareth Taylor.

On 28 August 2024, Goater departed Manchester City to take the role of Assistant Head Coach at Aston Villa W.F.C. On 11 December 2024, Goater was named caretaker manager after Aston Villa Women parted company with manager Robert de Pauw. Goater took charge of his first game later that same day, a 4–1 victory over Charlton Athletic in the Women's League Cup.

On 22 January 2025, Aston Villa hired Natalia Arroyo as new manager, and Goater returned to his role in the coaching staff. During his time as caretaker manager, Goater took charge of 4 matches, featuring 3 wins and 1 draw and had expressed a desire to take on the job permanently.

On 4 March 2026, Aston Villa Women announced that Goater had departed his coaching role at the club.

== Personal life ==
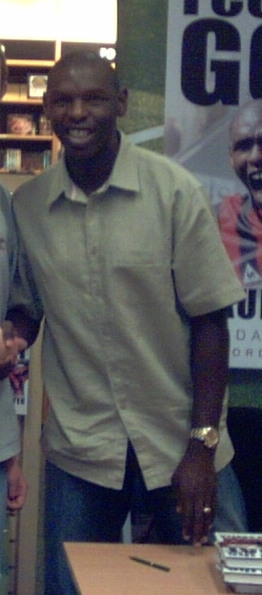
Goater at a book signing in September 2006

Goater is married to Anita, his childhood sweetheart, and has two daughters, Amaya and Anais (born 3 October 2000 in Wythenshawe, Manchester). He was awarded the MBE in 2003 for services to sport and young people in Bermuda. His autobiography, Feed the Goat: The Shaun Goater Story was published in September 2006.

== Honours ==
=== Player ===
Rotherham United

- Football League Trophy: 1995–96

Manchester City

- Football League First Division: 2001–02
- Football League Second Division play-offs: 1999

Southend United

- Football League One: 2005–06

Individual

- Football League First Division top scorer: 2001–02
- PFA Team of the Year: 1997–98 Second Division, 2001–02 First Division
- Manchester City Player of the Season: 1999–2000
- Member of the British Empire: 2003

=== Manager ===
North Village Rams

- Bermudian Premier Division: 2010–11
- Charity Shield (Super Cup): 2010–11
- Dudley Eve Trophy: 2009–10, 2010–11
- Friendship Trophy: 2009–10, 2010–11, 2011–12
