= Peter Griffiths (footballer, born 1862) =

Welsh footballer

Personal information
- Date of birth: September 1862
- Place of birth: Wales

International career
Years	Team	Apps	(Gls)
1884–1891	Wales	6	(0)

Peter Griffiths (born September 1862) was a Welsh international footballer. He was part of the Wales national football team between 1884 and 1891, playing 6 matches. He played his first match on 9 February 1884 against Ireland and his last match on 7 February 1891 against Ireland.

== See also ==
- List of Wales international footballers (alphabetical)
