= James Pinnock =

English footballer

Personal information
- Date of birth: 8 January 1978 (age 48)
- Place of birth: Dartford, Kent, England
- Position: Forward

Youth career
- Maidstone Invicta
- Gillingham

Senior career*
Years	Team	Apps	(Gls)
1996–2000	Gillingham	8	(0)
1999–2000	→ Margate (loan)	4	(1)
2000	→ Dover Athletic (loan)	13	(2)
2001	→ Chesham United (loan)		
2001–2003	Kingstonian	58	(4)
2003–2005	Gravesend & Northfleet	60	(11)
2005–2006	Welling United		
2006–2008	Margate	83	(40)
2008–2010	Maidstone United	62	(17)
2010–2011	Margate	51	(12)
2011–2012	Maidstone United	17	(2)
- * Club domestic league appearances and goals as of 19:18, 2 January 2012 (UTC)

James Pinnock is an English footballer.

== Career ==
Pinnock came through the ranks at his local Football League side Gillingham, making 16 first team appearances in total. After loan spells at Margate, Dover Athletic and Chesham United, Pinnock moved permanently from Gillingham to Conference side Kingstonian where he spent two years before joining Gravesend & Northfleet.

Pinnock spent two years at 'The Fleet' before joining Welling United in 2005. Pinnock spent a year at Welling and then moved onto Margate for whom he had previously played for on loan. Pinnock had his most fruitful goalscoring spell while at Margate, averaging nearly a goal every two games in the league.

In the 2008 close season Pinnock made the short trip along the M2 to join Maidstone United. Pinnock stayed at Maidstone for nearly two years, however in March 2010 he and three other players controversially left the club to join Margate, meaning Pinnock was now playing in his third spell for the Thanet side.

In the summer of 2011 Pinnock rejoined recently relegated Maidstone United where he joined up with Jay Saunders who had recently been made player-manager of the club. Pinnock left the club in early 2012 after struggling to hold down a place in the first team.
