= Fabrice Richard =

French footballer (born 1973)

Personal information
- Full name: Fabrice Richard
- Date of birth: August 16, 1973 (age 53)
- Place of birth: Saintes, France
- Height: 1.85 m (6 ft 1 in)
- Position: Defender

Senior career*
Years	Team	Apps	(Gls)
1989–1991	Chamois Niortais	1	(0)
1991–1993	Martigues	0	(0)
1993–1996	Gazélec Ajaccio	59	(2)
1996–1998	Ajaccio	64	(2)
1998–2000	Colchester United	24	(0)
2000–2001	Red Star	13	(0)
2002–2003	Olympique Alès	23	(1)
Total		184	(5)
- * Club domestic league appearances and goals

Fabrice Richard (born August 16, 1973) is a French former professional footballer who played as a defender.
