= Ray Kelly (footballer) =

Irish footballer

Ray Kelly (born 29 December 1976 in Dublin) was an Irish soccer player during the 1990s and early 21st century.

Kelly was a striker who began his career at Manchester City F.C., but made only one first team appearance, against Huddersfield Town on 7 November 1997. Kelly also played for Wrexham on loan from City.

He returned to Ireland in December 1998 to play for Bohemians. Kelly excelled during Bohs FAI Cup campaign in 2000 scoring 5 goals as they reached the final, losing in a replay to Shelbourne.
