= Peter Griffiths (footballer, born 1980) =

English footballer

Personal information
- Full name: Peter Griffiths
- Date of birth: 13 March 1980 (age 46)
- Place of birth: Droylsden, England
- Height: 5 ft 9 in (1.75 m)
- Position: Winger

Youth career
- Ashton United

Senior career*
Years	Team	Apps	(Gls)
1997–1998	Ashton United	2	(0)
1998–1999	Macclesfield Town	4	(1)
1999–20??	Winsford United		
- * Club domestic league appearances and goals

Peter Griffiths (born 13 March 1980) is an English former professional footballer who played on the wing in the Football League for Macclesfield Town. He also played non-league football for clubs including Ashton United and Winsford United.
