= Gerard Wiekens =

Dutch former footballer (born 1973)

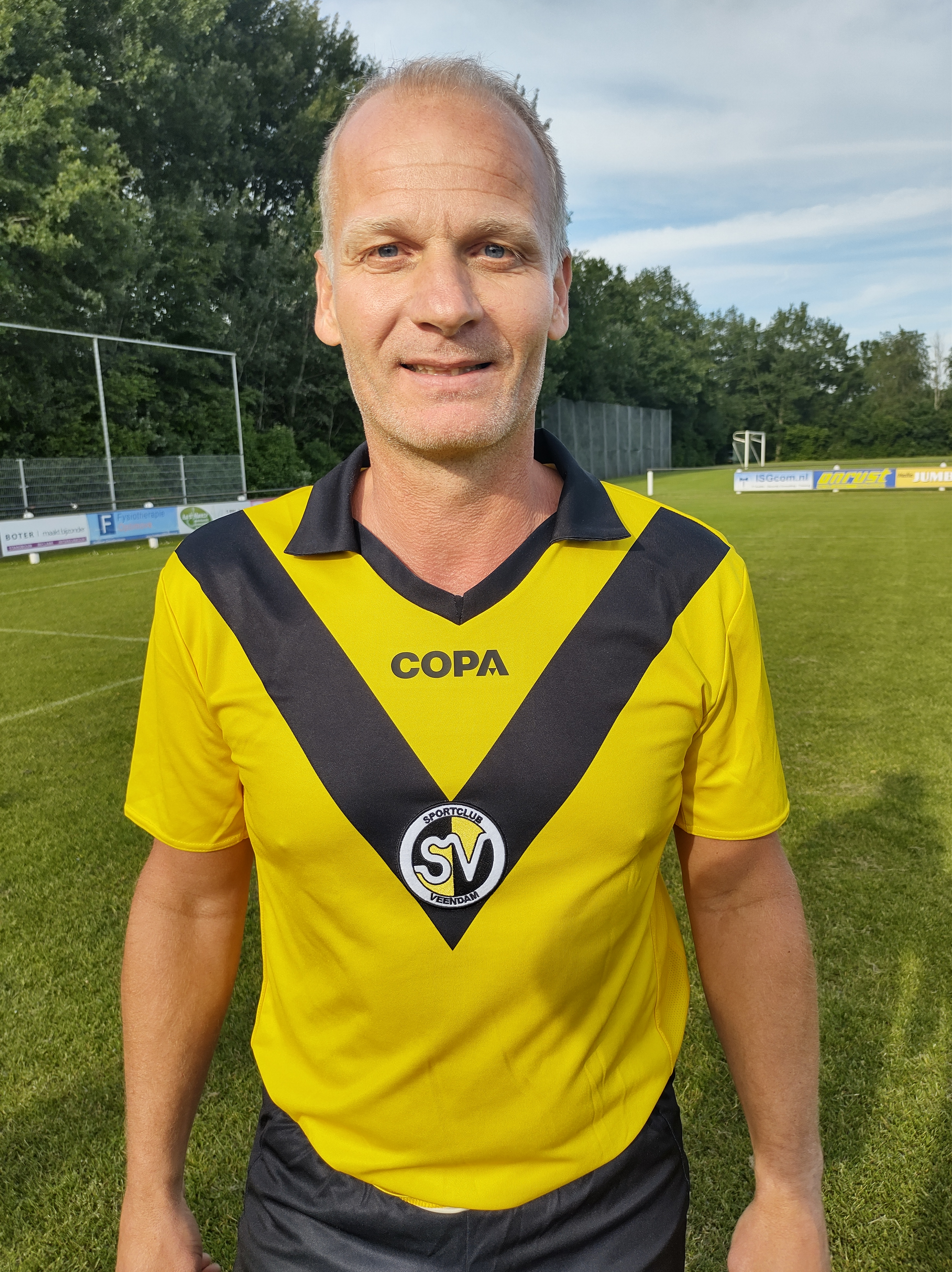

Personal information
- Full name: Gerard Wiekens
- Date of birth: 25 February 1973 (age 53)
- Place of birth: Oude Pekela, Netherlands
- Height: 1.86 m (6 ft 1 in)
- Positions: Centre back; sweeper; defensive midfielder

Team information
- Current team: FC Emmen (Assistant Manager)

Senior career*
Years	Team	Apps	(Gls)
1990–1997	BV Veendam	203	(12)
1997–2004	Manchester City	182	(10)
2004–2009	BV Veendam	133	(13)
Total		518	(35)

Managerial career
- 2018–2020: VV Noordster
- * Club domestic league appearances and goals

Gerard Wiekens (born 25 February 1973) is a Dutch football manager footballer and former professional footballer.

He usually played as a defender, but could also play in midfield or as a sweeper, he notably played for Manchester City between 1997 and 2004 where he was involved in three promotions and two relegations, playing in the top three levels of English football, including three seasons as a Premier League player. His spell at City was sandwiched between two spells with BV Veendam, where he would retire in 2009.

As a coach he remained with Veendam as assistant manager until the club folded in 2013, he later spent time with FC Groningen as a youth coach before a stint as manager of Dutch non-league side VV Noordster.

== Club career ==
Wiekens Wiekens was born in Oude Pekela. made his professional debut with Veendam in the 1990–91 season, and went on to make 26 appearances in his first season. He stayed at Veendam for nine seasons, and was named as club captain at the age of 20. In 1997 Wiekens made a £500,000 move to English club Manchester City, who were then playing in the First Division. Wiekens made his debut for Manchester City on the opening day of the 1997–98 season, scoring in a 2–2 draw with Portsmouth. Wiekens was a first team regular for five seasons, and in each of them Manchester City were either relegated or promoted, first suffering relegation to Division Two, then achieving consecutive promotions to reach the FA Premier League, before being relegated and promoted again.

Wiekens was Manchester City's Player of the Year for the 1998–99 season, a season in which he missed just four games. Wiekens lost his first team place during the 2001–02 season, and subsequently made only sporadic appearances for Manchester City. His final appearance for Manchester City was in August 2003 at the Millennium Stadium in a UEFA Cup match against TNS. He was released by Manchester City in May 2004, and rejoined his former club Veendam.

In September 2005, Wiekens broke his leg while playing for Veendam against Omniworld, an injury which was blamed on the artificial pitch on which the match took place.

== Coaching career ==
As a coach he remained with Veendam as assistant manager until the club folded in 2013, he later spent time with FC Groningen as a youth coach and as manager of Dutch non-league sides VV Noordster and WVV Winschoten.

Until July 1st. 2023, he was assistant manager at FC Emmen.

== Honours ==
=== As a Player ===
Manchester City

- Football League First Division: 2001–02
- Football League Second Division play-offs: 1999
