= Steve Germain =

French footballer (born 1981)

Personal information
- Full name: Steve Germain
- Date of birth: 22 June 1981 (age 45)
- Place of birth: Cannes, France
- Height: 1.78 m (5 ft 10 in)
- Position: Forward

Youth career
- AS Cannes

Senior career*
Years	Team	Apps	(Gls)
1998–1999	AS Cannes		
1999	→ Colchester United (loan)	6	(0)
1999	Colchester United	3	(0)
- AS Auch Gascogne
Total		9	(0)
- * Club domestic league appearances and goals

Steve Germain (born 22 June 1981) is a French footballer who played in the Football League as a forward for Colchester United. He has also represented AS Cannes in France.

== Career ==
Born in Cannes, France, Germain began his football career with his local club AS Cannes. He joined English Football League club Colchester United on loan in April 1999 with a view to a permanent deal. He made six appearances during his month-long loan deal, making his debut on 2 April in a 1–0 home win against Preston North End. He came on as a 71st-minute substitute for Jason Dozzell, aged 17.

Germain joined Colchester permanently following his loan spell, but struggled to break into the first-team. He made nine appearances in total for the U's without scoring a goal, his last game coming on 18 September 1999 in a 3–0 away defeat to Burnley, a game in which Germain started, being substituted for Lomana LuaLua after 52 minutes.

Following his Colchester exit, Germain returned to France, joining AS Auch Gascogne.
