= Jim Whitley =

Zambian-born Northern Irish footballer (born 1975)

Personal information
- Date of birth: 14 April 1975 (age 51)
- Place of birth: Ndola, Zambia
- Position: Midfielder

Team information
- Current team: Macclesfield (Under-18s manager)

Youth career
- 1986–1990: Brickfield Rangers
- 1990–1993: Manchester City

Senior career*
Years	Team	Apps	(Gls)
1993–2001	Manchester City	38	(0)
1999	→ Blackpool (loan)	7	(0)
2000	→ Norwich City (loan)	8	(1)
2000–2001	→ Swindon Town (loan)	2	(0)
2001	→ Northampton Town (loan)	13	(0)
2001–2006	Wrexham	140	(1)
2016	Brickfield Rangers		
Total		208	(2)

International career
1998–1999	Northern Ireland	3	(0)
1999	Northern Ireland B	1	(0)
- * Club domestic league appearances and goals

Jim Whitley (born 14 April 1975) is a football coach and former professional footballer who is under-18s manager of Macclesfield.

As a player he was a midfielder who notably played in the Premier League for Manchester City, and in the Football League for Blackpool, Norwich City, Swindon Town, Northampton Town and Wrexham. Born in Zambia, he represented the Northern Ireland and was capped three times.

== Early life ==
Born in Ndola, Zambia to a Zambian mother and Northern Irish father, Whitley originally wished to become a golfer. At the age of 11 he moved to Wrexham where he attended Ysgol Bryn Alyn. While at the school he became friends with future Wales international Robbie Savage who helped encourage his interest in football. At the age of 15, Whitley signed for Manchester City and, after completing his GCSEs in Wales, he attended Loreto college in Manchester to take A-levels in art and sports studies.

== Club career ==
Whitley began his career at Manchester City, signing his first professional contract at the age of 18 in 1993. He made his debut for the first team on 3 January 1998 in a 2–0 win over Bradford City in the FA Cup at the age of 22. His first league appearance came the following week in a 3–0 win against Portsmouth and he went on to make 21 appearances in all competitions before being voted the club's young player of the year. He remained a regular in the side until January 1999 when he fell out of favour, appearing just once in the final four months of the season.

At the start of the 1999–2000 season, Whitley joined Blackpool on loan to play first team football, playing 8 times for the side before returning to Manchester City where his only appearance during the remainder of the season came in a 1–1 draw with Huddersfield Town on 18 February 2000. The match would later turn out to be his final appearance for Manchester City and, after spending the whole 2000–01 season away from the club with loan spells at Norwich City, Swindon Town and Northampton Town, he joined Wrexham on a free transfer.

He became a first team regular at the Welsh side, but suffered a serious knee injury in February 2005 which kept him out for nine months. Whitley returned to the side to make 10 appearances during the 2005–06 season, but the knee injury quickly resurfaced and at the end of the season Wrexham decided not to offer Whitley an extension to his contract after undergoing three knee operations and making just 24 appearances in his final two years at the side.

In 2016, Jim Whitley agreed to make a surprise appearance to round off his career by playing for Brickfield Rangers against Droylsden FC after Sporting Director Andrew Ruscoe tracked Jim down to ask him would he play for the club one last time, the club where it all began all those years ago.

== International career ==
Along with his brother Jeff Whitley chose to represent Northern Ireland, qualifying through his father. He made his debut on 3 June 1998 in a 4–1 defeat against Spain and went on to win his second cap three months later in a 3–0 defeat to Turkey. Whitley made his third and final appearance for Northern Ireland two years later as a substitute in a 4–1 loss to Finland.

== Coaching career ==
In October 2022, Whitley was appointed manager of the under-18s team of Macclesfield whose Director of Football was childhood friend Robbie Savage.

== Personal life ==
His brother Jeff is also a former professional footballer, the pair played together at Manchester City.

Following his retirement, Whitley began performing as a singer and dancer in stage shows, appearing in productions called Christmas Crooners and The Rat Pack's Back, taking the roles of Nat King Cole and Sammy Davis Jr. in the respective shows.

Jim currently plays the role of Coach Byrne in the CBBC show Jamie Johnson FC.

Whitley also paints portraits and, in 2005, a number of his paintings were exhibited during an art show held at Maine Road, the former home stadium of Manchester City.
