= Andy Walker (footballer, born 1981) =

English footballer

Personal information
- Full name: Andrew William Walker
- Date of birth: 30 September 1981 (age 45)
- Place of birth: Bexleyheath, London, England
- Position: Goalkeeper

Team information
- Current team: Phoenix Sports

Youth career
- Colchester United

Senior career*
Years	Team	Apps	(Gls)
1998–2000	Colchester United	3	(0)
2000–2001	St Albans City	12	(0)
2001–2002	Exeter City	1	(0)
2002	Tonbridge Angels	?	(0)
2002	Doncaster Rovers	0	(0)
2002–2004	Wingate & Finchley	?	(0)
2004–2008	Bromley	?	(0)
2008–2009	Maidstone United	37	(0)
2009–2010	Billericay	?	(0)
2010	→ Maidstone United (loan)	9	(0)
2010–2011	Maidstone United	48	(0)
2011–2013	Cray Wanderers	93	(0)
2013–2015	Thurrock	60	(0)
2015	Harlow Town	12	(0)
2015	Thamesmead Town	1	(0)
2017–2021	Cray Valley Paper Mills		
2021	Erith Town	3	(0)
2021–2022	Chatham Town	28	(0)
2022–2024	Phoenix Sports	68	(0)
2024–	VCD Athletic	9	(0)
- * Club domestic league appearances and goals as of 18:59, 25 September 2024 (UTC)

Andrew William Walker is an English footballer who plays as a goalkeeper for Isthmian League South East Division club VCD Athletic.

== Career ==
Walker played professionally for both Colchester United and Exeter City and has also had a stint at Doncaster Rovers. Walker has also played for St Albans City, Tonbridge Angels, Wingate & Finchley and Bromley before joining Maidstone United in the summer of 2008. He spent a year at Maidstone, winning the Supporters Player of the Year in the process, before joining Billericay due to budget cuts at the Stones. He rejoined Maidstone on a month loan in February 2010 before the deal was made permanent in March 2010, and again won the Supporters Player of the Year for the 2010–11 season. In June 2011, Walker left Maidstone to join Cray Wanderers, with the player citing Maidstone's relegation to the Isthmian League Division One South as his reason for leaving the club.

Walker made over 100 appearances for Cray in all competitions, before leaving the club in September 2013, following a managerial change. He moved on to Thurrock and then Harlow Town, before joining Thamesmead Town at the beginning of the 2015–16 season. Walker won promotion with Chatham Town in the 2021–22 season before joining Phoenix Sports., where he won promotion from the Southern Counties East Football League Premier Division for a second consecutive season in 2022-23. In July 2024, he returned to the SCEFL Premier Division, joining VCD Athletic.
