= 2002–03 Colchester United F.C. season =

Colchester United
2002–03 season
- Chairman: Peter Heard
- Manager: Steve Whitton (until 29 January); Geraint Williams (caretaker) (29 January until 25 February); Phil Parkinson (from 25 February)
- Stadium: Layer Road
- Second Division: 12th
- FA Cup: 1st round (eliminated by Chester City)
- League Cup: 1st round (eliminated by Coventry City)
- Football League Trophy: 1st round (southern section) (eliminated by Cheltenham Town)
- Top goalscorer: League: Joe Keith (9); All: Joe Keith; Scott McGleish (9)
- Highest home attendance: 5,047 v Queens Park Rangers, 3 May 2003
- Lowest home attendance: 2,721 v Wigan Athletic, 31 August 2002
- Average home league attendance: 3,367
- Biggest win: 4–0 v Chesterfield, 18 March 2003
- Biggest defeat: 0–5 v Luton Town, 21 April 2003
Home colours

The 2002–03 season was Colchester United's 61st season in their history and their fifth successive season in the third tier of English football, the Second Division. Alongside competing in the Second Division, the club also participated in the FA Cup, the League Cup and the Football League Trophy.

After a first round FA Cup exit to Conference side Chester City and a seven-game winless run, manager Steve Whitton left the club by mutual consent, with Phil Parkinson appointed in his first ever managerial role. He led the club from the relegation zone to a 12th-place finish, their highest position for 23 years.

== Season overview ==
Following consecutive seasons of gradual improvement under Steve Whitton, the club found themselves in the relegation zone following a run of seven games without a win and a first round FA Cup exit to non-League Chester City. He left the club by mutual consent in January as former player Geraint Williams stepped up as caretaker manager while putting his name forward for the permanent role. However, with his many contacts at FA board level, chairman Peter Heard made a surprise appointment of Reading's player-coach Phil Parkinson.

Parkinson helped turn around the club's fortunes, lifting them from the relegation zone to 12th place, their best finish for 23 years.

In the League Cup, Colchester were eliminated by Coventry City in the first round, while Cheltenham Town defeated the U's in the first round of the Football League Trophy.

Away from the pitch, following the collapse of ITV Digital which had promised clubs greater television rights finances, a number of clubs found themselves entering administration or suffering lasting financial difficulty as a result of spending the money on players and resources before any had been received. Prudently, Peter Heard had never budgeted more than the club could afford and as such Colchester United were largely unaffected by the collapse.

== Players ==
As of match played 3 May 2003.

No.	Name	Position	Nationality	Place of birth	Date of birth	Apps	Goals	Signed from	Date signed	Fee
Goalkeepers
1	Simon Brown	GK	(England)	Chelmsford	3 December 1976 (aged 25)	85	0	(England) Tottenham Hotspur	20 July 1999	Free transfer
31	Richard McKinney	GK	(Northern Ireland)	Ballymoney	18 May 1979 (aged 23)	0	0	(England) Swindon Town	10 August 2002	Free transfer
32	Dean Gerken	GK	(England)	Southend-on-Sea	22 May 1985 (aged 17)	0	0	Youth team	1 August 2002	Free transfer
Defenders
2	Joe Dunne	FB	(Republic of Ireland)	Dublin	25 May 1973 (aged 29)	188	7	(England) Dover Athletic	7 December 1999 (Note: Date of signing refers to the date of the player's first game in his second spell for the club)	Nominal
3	Joe Keith	FB	(England)	Plaistow	1 October 1978 (aged 23)	126	10	(England) West Ham United	24 May 1999	Free transfer
5	Scott Fitzgerald	CB	(Republic of Ireland)	(England) Westminster	13 August 1969 (aged 32)	74	0	(England) Millwall	19 October 2000	Free transfer
8	Mark Warren	CB	(England)	Lower Clapton	12 November 1974 (aged 27)	0	0	(England) Notts County	6 August 2002	Free transfer
19	Alan White	CB	(England)	Darlington	22 March 1975 (aged 27)	77	3	(England) Luton Town	16 July 2000	Free transfer
24	Pat Baldwin	CB	(England)	City of London	12 November 1982 (aged 19)	0	0	(England) Chelsea	16 August 2002	Free transfer
25	Sam Stockley	FB	(England)	Tiverton	5 September 1977 (aged 24)	11	1	(England) Oxford United	31 October 2002	Free transfer
27	Greg Halford	FB/MF	(England)	Chelmsford	8 December 1984 (aged 17)	0	0	Youth team	1 August 2002	Free transfer
29	Mike Edwards	CB	(England)	Hessle	25 April 1980 (aged 22)	0	0	(England) Hull City	27 March 2003	Free transfer
Midfielders
4	Gavin Johnson	MF	(England)	Eye	10 October 1970 (aged 31)	93	3	(Scotland) Dunfermline Athletic	14 November 1999	Free transfer
6	Thomas Pinault	MF	(France)	Grasse	4 December 1981 (aged 20)	58	1	(France) AS Cannes	1 July 1999	Free transfer
7	Karl Duguid	MF	(England)	Letchworth	21 March 1978 (aged 24)	239	34	Youth team	9 December 1995 (Note: Date of signing refers to the date of the player's first game for the club)	Free transfer
10	Kemal Izzet	MF	(England)	Whitechapel	29 September 1980 (aged 21)	51	6	(England) Charlton Athletic	13 April 2001	Free transfer
14	Chris Keeble	MF	(England)	Colchester	17 September 1978 (aged 23)	25	2	(England) Ipswich Town	23 March 2000	Free transfer
16	Marc Canham	MF	(England)	(Germany) Wegberg	11 September 1982 (aged 19)	1	0	Youth team	1 August 2001	Free transfer
17	Bobby Bowry	MF	(Saint Kitts and Nevis)	(England) Hampstead	19 May 1971 (aged 31)	41	1	(England) Millwall	25 July 2001	Free transfer
20	Mick Stockwell	MF	(England)	Chelmsford	14 February 1965 (aged 37)	104	22	(England) Ipswich Town	23 July 2000	Free transfer
	Matt Hearn	MF	(England)	Barking	17 January 1984 (aged 18)	0	0	Youth team	1 July 2000	Free transfer
	Craig Johnston	MF	(England)		4 December 1985 (aged 16)	0	0	Youth team	1 July 2002	Free transfer
Forwards
9	Scott McGleish	FW	(England)	Chipping Barnet	10 February 1974 (aged 28)	90	27	(England) Barnet	12 January 2001	£15,000
11	Dean Morgan	FW	(Montserrat)	(England) Edmonton	3 October 1983 (aged 18)	38	0	Youth team	1 August 2000	Free transfer
12	Kevin Rapley	FW	(England)	Reading	21 September 1977 (aged 24)	40	9	(England) Notts County	1 August 2001	Free transfer
15	Adrian Coote	FW	(Northern Ireland)	(England) Great Yarmouth	30 September 1978 (aged 23)	19	4	(England) Norwich City	21 December 2001	£50,000
21	Mvondo Atangana	FW	(Cameroon)	Yaoundé	10 July 1979 (aged 22)	0	0	(Scotland) Dundee United	8 November 2002	Undisclosed
27	Ben Cranfield	FW	(England)	Ipswich	1 March 1984 (aged 18)	0	0	Youth team	1 August 2001	Free transfer
	Tristan Toney	FW	(England)		4 February 1984 (aged 18)	0	0	Youth team	1 July 2002	Free transfer

== Transfers ==
=== In ===
Date	Position	Nationality	Name	From	Fee	Ref.
1 July 2002	MF	(England)	Craig Johnston	Youth team	Free transfer	
1 July 2002	FW	(England)	Tristan Toney	Youth team	Free transfer	
29 July 2002	CB	(England)	Danny Steele	(England) Millwall	Free transfer	
1 August 2002	GK	(England)	Dean Gerken	Youth team	Free transfer	
1 August 2002	FB/MF	(England)	Greg Halford	Youth team	Free transfer	
6 August 2002	CB	(England)	Mark Warren	(England) Notts County	Free transfer	
10 August 2002	GK	(Northern Ireland)	Richard McKinney	(England) Swindon Town	Free transfer	
16 August 2002	CB	(England)	Pat Baldwin	(England) Chelsea	Free transfer	
31 October 2002	FB	(England)	Sam Stockley	(England) Oxford United	Free transfer	
8 November 2002	FW	(Cameroon)	Mvondo Atangana	(Scotland) Dundee United	Undisclosed	
27 March 2003	CB	(England)	Mike Edwards	(England) Hull City	Free transfer	

- Total spending: ▼ ~ £0

=== Out ===
Date	Position	Nationality	Name	To	Fee	Ref.
31 May 2002	CB	(Australia)	Con Blatsis	(Turkey) Kocaelispor	Free transfer	
30 June 2002	DF/MF	(England)	Anthony Allman	(England) Woking	Released	
1 August 2002	MF	(England)	David Gregory	(England) Canvey Island	Released	(Note: Rejected offer of a new one-year deal)
12 August 2002	CB	(England)	Ross Johnson	(England) Dagenham & Redbridge	Released	
1 October 2002	FB	(England)	David Hadrava	(England) Heybridge Swifts	Released	
14 October 2002	FW	(England)	Triston Chambers	(England) Dagenham & Redbridge	Released	
25 October 2002	GK	(England)	Glenn Williamson	Free agent	Released	
15 November 2002	FW	(England)	Lloyd Opara	(England) Cambridge United	Free transfer	
3 December 2002	CB	(England)	Danny Steele	(England) Fisher Athletic	Released	

- Total incoming: ▲ ~ £0

=== Loans in ===
Date	Position	Nationality	Name	From	End date	Ref.
15 August 2002	MF	(England)	Leke Odunsi	(England) Millwall	1 November 2002	(Note: Loan end date refers to the date of the player's final game for the club)
31 August 2002	FB	(England)	Sam Stockley	(England) Oxford United	30 October 2002	
22 October 2002	FW	(England)	Justin Richards	(England) Bristol Rovers	10 December 2002	
23 January 2003	FW	(Wales)	Gareth Williams	(England) Crystal Palace	19 March 2003	
24 January 2003	CB	(England)	Liam Chilvers	(England) Arsenal	31 May 2003	
10 March 2003	MF	(England)	Johnnie Jackson	(England) Tottenham Hotspur	4 May 2003	
27 March 2003	FW	(England)	Ben May	(England) Millwall	4 May 2003	

=== Loans out ===
Date	Position	Nationality	Name	To	End date	Ref.
5 September 2002	FW	(England)	Triston Chambers	(England) Harlow Town	5 October 2002	
15 October 2002	FW	(England)	Lloyd Opara	(England) Cambridge United	14 November 2002	
21 October 2002	FW	(Northern Ireland)	Adrian Coote	(England) Bristol Rovers	9 February 2003	

== Match details ==
=== Second Division ===
==== League table ====
Pos	Team	Pld	W	D	L	GF	GA	GD	Pts
10	Swindon Town	46	16	12	18	59	63	−4	60
11	Peterborough United	46	14	16	16	51	54	−3	58
12	Colchester United	46	14	16	16	52	56	−4	58
13	Blackpool	46	15	13	18	56	64	−8	58
14	Stockport County	46	15	10	21	65	70	−5	55

Rules for classification: In the Football League goals scored (GF) takes precedence over goal difference (GD).

==== Results round by round ====
Round	1	2	3	4	5	6	7	8	9	10	11	12	13	14	15	16	17	18	19	20	21	22	23	24	25	26	27	28	29	30	31	32	33	34	35	36	37	38	39	40	41	42	43	44	45	46
Ground	H	A	A	H	A	H	H	A	A	H	A	H	A	H	A	H	A	H	A	H	A	H	H	A	H	H	A	H	A	A	H	A	H	H	A	A	H	A	A	H	A	H	A	H	A	H
Result	W	D	L	L	W	W	D	L	L	L	L	L	D	W	D	D	L	D	W	D	W	L	D	L	D	L	L	L	D	W	W	D	W	W	L	D	W	W	D	W	D	D	W	L	D	L
Position	10	8	15	19	12	9	11	14	16	16	20	20	21	17	19	18	18	21	19	19	15	16	17	18	17	19	21	22	21	20	16	18	17	15	17	16	15	12	14	11	11	11	10	10	10	12

Source: Statto.com (archived)
A = Away; H = Home; W = Win; D = Draw; L = Loss

==== Matches ====
10 August 2002 1	Colchester United	1–0	Stockport County	Colchester
15:00 BST	Pinault 58'	Report	McLachlan (yellow card) 49' (red card)	Stadium: Layer Road; Attendance: 3,300; Referee: Paul Danson

13 August 2002 2	Tranmere Rovers	1–1	Colchester United	Birkenhead
	Koumas 15'	Report	Keith 53'	Stadium: Prenton Park; Attendance: 7,499; Referee: Mike Pike

17 August 2002 3	Crewe Alexandra	2–0	Colchester United	Crewe
	Hulse 9'; Bell 81'	Report		Stadium: Gresty Road; Attendance: 5,138; Referee: Graham Salisbury

24 August 2002 4	Colchester United	0–1	Brentford	Colchester
15:00 BST		Report	Hunt 45' (pen.)	Stadium: Layer Road; Attendance: 3,135; Referee: Paul Taylor

26 August 2002 5	Peterborough United	0–1	Colchester United	Peterborough
		Report	Keith 80'; Warren (yellow card) 90' (red card)	Stadium: London Road Stadium; Attendance: 4,203; Referee: P Armstrong

31 August 2002 6	Colchester United	1–0	Wigan Athletic	Colchester
15:00 BST	Morgan 41'	Report		Stadium: Layer Road; Attendance: 2,721; Referee: Keith Hill

7 September 2002 7	Colchester United	1–1	Cheltenham Town	Colchester
14:00 BST	Keith 59' (pen.)	Report	Naylor 45'	Stadium: Layer Road; Attendance: 2,845; Referee: B Curson

14 September 2002 8	Port Vale	1–0	Colchester United	Burslem
	Collins 47'	Report		Stadium: Vale Park; Attendance: 3,328; Referee: M Ryan

17 September 2002 9	Northampton Town	4–1	Colchester United	Northampton
	Gabbiadini 15', 45', 69'; Oné 23'	Report	Sampson 39' (o.g.)	Stadium: Sixfields Stadium; Attendance: 3,663; Referee: G Cain

21 September 2002 10	Colchester United	0–1	Oldham Athletic	Colchester
15:00 BST	Warren (red card) 56'	Report	Andrews 64'; Hill (red card) 53'	Stadium: Layer Road; Attendance: 3,021; Referee: Grant Hegley

28 September 2002 11	Queens Park Rangers	2–0	Colchester United	Shepherd's Bush
15:00 BST	Connolly 39'; Gallen 72'	Report		Stadium: Loftus Road; Attendance: 12,906; Referee: Steve Tomlin

5 October 2002 12	Colchester United	0–1	Wycombe Wanderers	Colchester
15:00 BST		Report	Brown 4' (pen.)	Stadium: Layer Road; Attendance: 3,252; Referee: D Pugh

12 October 2002 13	Swindon Town	2–2	Colchester United	Swindon
	Gurney 66'; Sabin 68'	Report	McGleish 3'; Pinault 49'	Stadium: County Ground; Attendance: 4,152; Referee: Mark Warren

18 October 2002 14	Colchester United	2–0	Chesterfield	Colchester
19:45 BST	Izzet 58', 73'	Report		Stadium: Layer Road; Attendance: 3,211; Referee: Trevor Parkes

26 October 2002 15	Huddersfield Town	1–1	Colchester United	Huddersfield
	Stead 90'	Report	Rapley 11'	Stadium: Kirklees Stadium; Attendance: 8,912; Referee: Phil Joslin

29 October 2002 16	Colchester United	1–1	Barnsley	Colchester
19:45 GMT	Stockley 10'; Steele (red card) 17'	Report	Dyer 15'	Stadium: Layer Road; Attendance: 3,096; Referee: Clive Penton

1 November 2002 17	Mansfield Town	4–2	Colchester United	Mansfield
	Christie 19', 25', 29', 64'	Report	Keith 25' (pen.); Rapley 31'; White (yellow card) 81' (red card)	Stadium: Field Mill; Attendance: 3,414; Referee: Howard Webb

9 November 2002 18	Colchester United	2–2	Bristol City	Colchester
15:00 GMT	Pinault 55'; Bowry 66'	Report	Peacock 42', 58'	Stadium: Layer Road; Attendance: 3,338; Referee: Joe Ross

23 November 2002 19	Notts County	2–3	Colchester United	Nottingham
	Allsopp 16'; Brough 18'	Report	Morgan 7', 35'; McGleish 83'	Stadium: Meadow Lane; Attendance: 4,626; Referee: Anthony Leake

30 November 2002 20	Colchester United	0–0	Plymouth Argyle	Colchester
15:00 GMT		Report		Stadium: Layer Road; Attendance: 3,714; Referee: Carl Boyeson

14 December 2002 21	Luton Town	1–2	Colchester United	Luton
	Fotiadis 35'	Report	Duguid 45'; Morgan 58'	Stadium: Kenilworth Road; Attendance: 5,890; Referee: M Cowburn

20 December 2002 22	Colchester United	1–2	Cardiff City	Colchester
19:45 GMT	Stockwell 52'; Rapley (red card) 58'	Report	Earnshaw 45', 77'; Zhiyi (red card) 59'	Stadium: Layer Road; Attendance: 3,096; Referee: Uriah Rennie

26 December 2002 23	Colchester United	1–1	Peterborough United	Colchester
15:00 GMT	Izzet 45'	Report	Clarke 82'	Stadium: Layer Road; Attendance: 3,760; Referee: Fraser Stretton

28 December 2002 24	Blackpool	3–1	Colchester United	Blackpool
	Walker 34'; Grayson 45'; Murphy 59'	Report	Izzet 71'	Stadium: Bloomfield Road; Attendance: 6,040; Referee: A Kaye

4 January 2003 25	Colchester United	2–2	Tranmere Rovers	Colchester
15:00 GMT	McGleish 12'; Keith 69' (pen.)	Report	Haworth 38'; Mellon 60'	Stadium: Layer Road; Attendance: 2,846; Referee: Lee Cable

11 January 2003 26	Colchester United	1–2	Crewe Alexandra	Colchester
15:00 GMT	Stockwell 41'	Report	Jones 56', 62'	Stadium: Layer Road; Attendance: 2,949; Referee: Keith Hill

18 January 2003 27	Wigan Athletic	2–1	Colchester United	Wigan
	de Vos 44'; Liddell 74' (pen.)	Report	Keith 90' (pen.)	Stadium: JJB Stadium; Attendance: 5,792; Referee: Andy Penn

25 January 2003 28	Colchester United	0–2	Blackpool	Colchester
15:00 GMT	Duguid (yellow card) 82' (red card)	Report	Murphy 52'; Coid 70'	Stadium: Layer Road; Attendance: 3,305; Referee: Colin Webster

1 February 2003 29	Stockport County	1–1	Colchester United	Stockport
	Beckett 36'	Report	Keith 88'	Stadium: Edgeley Park; Attendance: 4,011; Referee: Joe Ross

8 February 2003 30	Bristol City	1–2	Colchester United	Bristol
	Fagan 51'	Report	McGleish 12'; Pinault 69'	Stadium: Ashton Gate Stadium; Attendance: 11,107; Referee: Andy Hall

14 February 2003 31	Colchester United	1–0	Mansfield Town	Colchester
19:45 GMT	McGleish 88'	Report		Stadium: Layer Road; Attendance: 3,247; Referee: Iain Williamson

22 February 2003 32	Cheltenham Town	1–1	Colchester United	Cheltenham
	Alsop 2'	Report	Williams 44'	Stadium: Whaddon Road; Attendance: 3,607; Referee: Steve Baines

1 March 2003 33	Colchester United	4–1	Port Vale	Colchester
15:00 GMT	Williams 7', 36', 72'; Keith 53'	Report	Bridge-Wilkinson 55'	Stadium: Layer Road; Attendance: 3,581; Referee: Scott Mathieson

4 March 2003 34	Colchester United	2–0	Northampton Town	Colchester
19:45 GMT	Williams 28'; McGleish 76'	Report		Stadium: Layer Road; Attendance: 3,408; Referee: D Crick

8 March 2003 35	Oldham Athletic	2–0	Colchester United	Oldham
	Eyre 13'; Eyres 19'	Report	White (red card) 45'	Stadium: Boundary Park; Attendance: 5,223; Referee: Paul Danson

11 March 2003 36	Brentford	1–1	Colchester United	Brentford
	McCammon 37'	Report	Keith 84' (pen.)	Stadium: Griffin Park; Attendance: 3,990; Referee: P Crossley

15 March 2003 37	Colchester United	2–0	Huddersfield Town	Colchester
15:00 GMT	Izzet 74'; McGleish 81'	Report	Sharp (red card) 40'	Stadium: Layer Road; Attendance: 3,835; Referee: P Armstrong

18 March 2003 38	Chesterfield	0–4	Colchester United	Chesterfield
		Report	Izzet 43'; Williams 48'; Payne 68' (o.g.); Morgan 81'	Stadium: Saltergate; Attendance: 3,226; Referee: Neale Barry

22 March 2003 39	Barnsley	1–1	Colchester United	Barnsley
	Dyer 36'	Report	McGleish 38'	Stadium: Oakwell; Attendance: 9,154; Referee: Eddie Evans

29 March 2003 40	Colchester United	1–0	Swindon Town	Colchester
15:00 GMT	Izzet 57'	Report		Stadium: Layer Road; Attendance: 3,787; Referee: Graham Poll

5 April 2003 41	Plymouth Argyle	0–0	Colchester United	Plymouth
		Report		Stadium: Home Park; Attendance: 7,122; Referee: Paul Taylor

12 April 2003 42	Colchester United	1–1	Notts County	Colchester
15:00 BST	Duguid 2'	Report	Stallard 45'	Stadium: Layer Road; Attendance: 3,435; Referee: Mark Warren

19 April 2003 43	Cardiff City	0–3	Colchester United	Cardiff
		Report	Duguid 4'; Izzet 61'; Morgan 73'	Stadium: Ninian Park; Attendance: 12,663; Referee: Steve Tomlin

21 April 2003 44	Colchester United	0–5	Luton Town	Colchester
15:00 BST		Report	Howard 14', 45', 90'; Griffiths 21'; Nicholls 43' (pen.)	Stadium: Layer Road; Attendance: 3,967; Referee: Clive Penton

26 April 2003 45	Wycombe Wanderers	0–0	Colchester United	High Wycombe
15:00 BST		Report		Stadium: Adams Park; Attendance: 6,283; Referee: B Curson

3 May 2003 46	Colchester United	0–1	Queens Park Rangers	Colchester
15:00 BST		Report	Furlong 52'	Stadium: Layer Road; Attendance: 5,047; Referee: Paul Durkin

=== Football League Cup ===
11 September 2002 1st round	Coventry City	3–0	Colchester United	Coventry
	McSheffrey 1'; McAllister 15'; Mills 83'	Report		Stadium: Highfield Road; Attendance: 6,075; Referee: Ray Olivier

=== Football League Trophy ===
22 October 2002 1st round (southern section)	Cheltenham Town	4–1	Colchester United	Cheltenham
	Brayson 45' (pen.), 78'; McCann 63'; Alsop 68'	Report	McGleish 57'; McKinney (red card) 45'	Stadium: Whaddon Road; Attendance: 1,369; Referee: Paul Danson

=== FA Cup ===
16 November 2002 1st round	Colchester United	0–1	Chester City	Colchester
15:00 GMT		Report	Tate 83'	Stadium: Layer Road; Attendance: 2,901; Referee: Steve Tomlin

== Squad statistics ==
=== Appearances and goals ===
No.	Pos	Nat	Player	Total		Second Division		FA Cup		League Cup		Football League Trophy	
No.	Pos	Nat	Player	Apps	Goals	Apps	Goals	Apps	Goals	Apps	Goals	Apps	Goals
1	GK	(England) ENG	Simon Brown	29	0	26+1	0	1	0	0	0	0+1	0
3	DF	(England) ENG	Joe Keith	39	9	36	9	1	0	1	0	1	0
4	MF	(England) ENG	Gavin Johnson	9	0	8	0	0	0	1	0	0	0
5	DF	(Republic of Ireland) IRL	Scott Fitzgerald	26	0	26	0	0	0	0	0	0	0
6	MF	(France) FRA	Thomas Pinault	45	4	32+10	4	1	0	1	0	1	0
7	MF	(England) ENG	Karl Duguid	27	3	26+1	3	0	0	0	0	0	0
8	DF	(England) ENG	Mark Warren	21	0	20	0	1	0	0	0	0	0
9	FW	(England) ENG	Scott McGleish	46	9	38+5	8	1	0	1	0	1	1
10	MF	(England) ENG	Kemal Izzet	48	8	43+2	8	1	0	1	0	1	0
11	FW	(Montserrat) MSR	Dean Morgan	39	6	22+15	6	0+1	0	1	0	0	0
12	FW	(England) ENG	Kevin Rapley	24	2	14+7	2	1	0	0+1	0	1	0
14	MF	(England) ENG	Chris Keeble	3	0	0+3	0	0	0	0	0	0	0
15	FW	(Northern Ireland) NIR	Adrian Coote	16	0	7+9	0	0	0	0	0	0	0
16	MF	(England) ENG	Marc Canham	3	0	2+1	0	0	0	0	0	0	0
17	MF	(Saint Kitts and Nevis) SKN	Bobby Bowry	38	1	33+2	1	1	0	1	0	1	0
19	DF	(England) ENG	Alan White	43	0	41	0	0	0	1	0	1	0
20	MF	(England) ENG	Mick Stockwell	42	2	30+9	2	1	0	1	0	1	0
21	FW	(Cameroon) CMR	Mvondo Atangana	7	0	1+5	0	0+1	0	0	0	0	0
24	DF	(England) ENG	Pat Baldwin	22	0	13+7	0	1	0	1	0	0	0
25	DF	(England) ENG	Sam Stockley	35	1	31+2	1	1	0	0	0	1	0
27	DF	(England) ENG	Greg Halford	1	0	1	0	0	0	0	0	0	0
29	DF	(England) ENG	Mike Edwards	5	0	3+2	0	0	0	0	0	0	0
31	GK	(Northern Ireland) NIR	Richard McKinney	23	0	20+1	0	0	0	1	0	1	0
Players who appeared for Colchester who left during the season
18	DF	(England) ENG	Liam Chilvers	6	0	6	0	0	0	0	0	0	0
18	FW	(England) ENG	Justin Richards	3	0	0+2	0	0	0	0	0	0+1	0
22	DF	(England) ENG	Danny Steele	9	0	6+2	0	0	0	0	0	1	0
23	MF	(England) ENG	Leke Odunsi	8	0	3+3	0	0	0	0+1	0	0+1	0
23	FW	(Wales) WAL	Gareth Williams	8	6	6+2	6	0	0	0	0	0	0
26	MF	(England) ENG	Johnnie Jackson	8	0	8	0	0	0	0	0	0	0
26	FW	(England) ENG	Lloyd Opara	6	0	0+5	0	0	0	0+1	0	0	0
28	FW	(England) ENG	Ben May	6	0	4+2	0	0	0	0	0	0	0

=== Goalscorers ===
Place	Number	Nationality	Position	Name	Second Division	FA Cup	League Cup	Football League Trophy	Total
1	3	(England)	FB	Joe Keith	9	0	0	0	9
1	9	(England)	FW	Scott McGleish	8	0	0	1	9
3	10	(England)	MF	Kemal Izzet	8	0	0	0	8
4	11	(Montserrat)	FW	Dean Morgan	6	0	0	0	6
4	23	(Wales)	FW	Gareth Williams	6	0	0	0	6
6	6	(France)	MF	Thomas Pinault	4	0	0	0	4
7	7	(England)	MF	Karl Duguid	3	0	0	0	3
8	12	(England)	FW	Kevin Rapley	2	0	0	0	2
8	20	(England)	MF	Mick Stockwell	2	0	0	0	2
10	17	(Saint Kitts and Nevis)	MF	Bobby Bowry	1	0	0	0	1
10	25	(England)	FB	Sam Stockley	1	0	0	0	1
				Own goals	2	0	0	0	2
				TOTALS	52	0	0	1	53

=== Disciplinary record ===
Number	Nationality	Position	Name	Second Division		FA Cup		League Cup		Football League Trophy		Total	
Number	Nationality	Position	Name	Booked	Sent off (straight red)	Booked	Sent off (straight red)	Booked	Sent off (straight red)	Booked	Sent off (straight red)	Booked	Sent off (straight red)
19	(England)	CB	Alan White	13	2	0	0	0	0	0	0	13	2
8	(England)	CB	Mark Warren	5	2	0	0	0	0	0	0	5	2
7	(England)	MF	Karl Duguid	4	1	0	0	0	0	0	0	4	1
10	(England)	MF	Kemal Izzet	5	0	0	0	0	0	0	0	5	0
12	(England)	FW	Kevin Rapley	1	1	0	0	0	0	1	0	2	1
22	(Northern Ireland)	CB	Danny Steele	1	1	0	0	0	0	0	0	1	1
24	(England)	CB	Pat Baldwin	3	0	0	0	1	0	0	0	4	0
31	(Northern Ireland)	GK	Richard McKinney	1	0	0	0	0	0	0	1	1	1
6	(France)	MF	Thomas Pinault	3	0	0	0	0	0	0	0	3	0
17	(Saint Kitts and Nevis)	MF	Bobby Bowry	3	0	0	0	0	0	0	0	3	0
25	(England)	FB	Sam Stockley	3	0	0	0	0	0	0	0	3	0
5	(Republic of Ireland)	CB	Scott Fitzgerald	2	0	0	0	0	0	0	0	2	0
9	(England)	FW	Scott McGleish	2	0	0	0	0	0	0	0	2	0
18	(England)	CB	Liam Chilvers	2	0	0	0	0	0	0	0	2	0
3	(England)	FB	Joe Keith	0	0	0	0	0	0	1	0	1	0
4	(England)	MF	Gavin Johnson	1	0	0	0	0	0	0	0	1	0
15	(Northern Ireland)	FW	Adrian Coote	1	0	0	0	0	0	0	0	1	0
18	(England)	FW	Justin Richards	1	0	0	0	0	0	0	0	1	0
20	(England)	MF	Mick Stockwell	1	0	0	0	0	0	0	0	1	0
23	(England)	MF	Leke Odunsi	1	0	0	0	0	0	0	0	1	0
26	(England)	MF	Johnnie Jackson	1	0	0	0	0	0	0	0	1	0
28	(England)	FW	Ben May	1	0	0	0	0	0	0	0	1	0
29	(England)	CB	Mike Edwards	1	0	0	0	0	0	0	0	1	0
			TOTALS	56	7	0	0	1	0	2	1	59	8

=== Clean sheets ===
Number of games goalkeepers kept a clean sheet.

Place	Number	Nationality	Player	Second Division	FA Cup	League Cup	Football League Trophy	Total
1	31	(Northern Ireland)	Richard McKinney	9	0	0	0	9
2	1	(England)	Simon Brown	3	0	0	0	3
			TOTALS	12	0	0	0	12

=== Player debuts ===
Players making their first-team Colchester United debut in a fully competitive match.

Number	Position	Nationality	Player	Date	Opponent	Ground	Notes
8	CB	(England)	Mark Warren	10 August 2002	Stockport County	Layer Road	
31	GK	(Northern Ireland)	Richard McKinney	10 August 2002	Stockport County	Layer Road	
22	CB	(England)	Danny Steele	24 August 2002	Brentford	Layer Road	
23	MF	(England)	Leke Odunsi	26 August 2002	Peterborough United	London Road Stadium	
25	FB	(England)	Sam Stockley	7 September 2002	Cheltenham Town	Layer Road	
24	CB	(England)	Pat Baldwin	11 September 2002	Coventry City	Highfield Road	
18	FW	(England)	Justin Richards	22 October 2002	Cheltenham Town	Whaddon Road	
25	FB	(England)	Sam Stockley	9 November 2002	Bristol City	Layer Road	(Note: Second debut for the club)
21	FW	(Cameroon)	Mvondo Atangana	16 November 2002	Chester City	Layer Road	
18	CB	(England)	Liam Chilvers	25 January 2003	Blackpool	Layer Road	
23	FW	(Wales)	Gareth Williams	25 January 2003	Blackpool	Layer Road	
26	MF	(England)	Johnnie Jackson	11 March 2003	Brentford	Griffin Park	
28	FW	(England)	Ben May	29 March 2003	Swindon Town	Layer Road	
29	CB	(England)	Mike Edwards	5 April 2003	Plymouth Argyle	Home Park	
27	FB/MF	(England)	Greg Halford	21 April 2003	Luton Town	Layer Road	

== See also ==
- List of Colchester United F.C. seasons
