= 2001–02 Colchester United F.C. season =

Colchester United
2001–02 season
- Chairman: Peter Heard
- Manager: Steve Whitton
- Stadium: Layer Road
- Second Division: 15th
- FA Cup: 1st round (eliminated by York City)
- League Cup: 2nd round (eliminated by Barnsley)
- Football League Trophy: 2nd round (southern section) (eliminated by Reading)
- Top goalscorer: League: Scott McGleish (15); All: Scott McGleish (16)
- Highest home attendance: 5,186 v Wycombe Wanderers, 23 October 2001
- Lowest home attendance: 1,251 v Swindon Town, 16 October 2001
- Average home league attendance: 3,705
- Biggest win: 6–3 v Chesterfield, 11 August 2001
- Biggest defeat: 0–3 v Stoke City, 26 September 2001 v Reading, 26 January 2002; 1–4 v Brentford, 29 September 2001 v Oldham Athletic, 2 March 2002 v Brighton & Hove Albion, 30 March 2002
Home colours

The 2001–02 season was Colchester United's 60th season in their history and their fourth successive season in the third tier of English football, the Second Division. Alongside competing in the Second Division, the club also participated in the FA Cup, the League Cup and the Football League Trophy.

Steve Whitton led the U's to a 15th placed league finish. They were knocked out of the FA Cup by York City in the first round. In the League Cup, Colchester defeated First Division Portsmouth at Fratton Park, before falling to defeat to Barnsley in the second round. They also reached the second round of the Football League Trophy, beating Swindon Town in the first round but they were eliminated by Reading in the second round.

== Season overview ==
Colchester leapt to the top of the Second Division table by the end of August, having beaten Chesterfield 6–3 in the opening game of the season, and also knocked out First Division Portsmouth out of the League Cup at Fratton Park. However, they failed to capitalise on this despite manager Steve Whitton equalling the club's record transfer fee of £50,000 for Northern Ireland international Adrian Coote from Norwich City. They finished 15th, a steady year-on-year improvement after recording 18th and then 17th-place finishes in the previous campaigns respectively.

After beating Portsmouth in the first round of the League Cup, Barnsley proved too much for the U's in the second round. York City eliminated Colchester from the FA Cup in the first round, and Reading defeated the U's in the second round of the Football League Trophy following a first round win over Swindon Town.

== Players ==
As of match played 20 April 2002.

No.	Name	Position	Nationality	Place of birth	Date of birth	Apps	Goals	Signed from	Date signed	Fee
Goalkeepers
1	Simon Brown	GK	(England)	Chelmsford	3 December 1976 (aged 24)	64	0	(England) Tottenham Hotspur	20 July 1999	Free transfer
13	Glenn Williamson	GK	(England)	Enfield Town	22 December 1982 (aged 18)	0	0	Youth team	1 August 1999	Free transfer
Defenders
2	Joe Dunne	FB	(Republic of Ireland)	Dublin	25 May 1973 (aged 28)	178	5	(England) Dover Athletic	7 December 1999 (Note: Date of signing refers to the date of the player's first game in his second spell for the club)	Nominal
3	Joe Keith	FB	(England)	Plaistow	1 October 1978 (aged 22)	79	5	(England) West Ham United	24 May 1999	Free transfer
5	Ross Johnson	CB	(England)	Brighton	2 January 1976 (aged 25)	36	0	(England) Brighton & Hove Albion	14 February 2000	Free transfer
6	Con Blatsis	CB	(Australia)	Melbourne	6 July 1977 (aged 23)	0	0	(Norway) Lillestrøm	15 March 2002	Non-contract
12	Scott Fitzgerald	CB	(Republic of Ireland)	(England) Westminster	13 August 1969 (aged 31)	32	0	(England) Millwall	19 October 2000	Free transfer
18	Anthony Allman	DF/MF	(England)	Sidcup	14 December 1980 (aged 20)	0	0	(England) Charlton Athletic	27 July 2001	Free transfer
19	Alan White	CB	(England)	Darlington	22 March 1975 (aged 26)	42	0	(England) Luton Town	16 July 2000	Free transfer
26	David Hadrava	FB	(England)	Ilford	26 February 1983 (aged 18)	0	0	Youth team	1 August 2001	Free transfer
Midfielders
4	Gavin Johnson	MF	(England)	Eye	10 October 1970 (aged 30)	69	2	(Scotland) Dunfermline Athletic	14 November 1999	Free transfer
7	Karl Duguid	MF	(England)	Letchworth	21 March 1978 (aged 23)	194	29	Youth team	9 December 1995 (Note: Date of signing refers to the date of the player's first game for the club)	Free transfer
8	David Gregory	MF	(England)	Sudbury	23 January 1970 (aged 31)	240	28	(England) Peterborough United	8 December 1995	Free transfer
10	Kemal Izzet	MF	(England)	Whitechapel	29 September 1980 (aged 20)	6	1	(England) Charlton Athletic	13 April 2001	Free transfer
14	Chris Keeble	MF	(England)	Colchester	17 September 1978 (aged 22)	25	2	(England) Ipswich Town	23 March 2000	Free transfer
15	Thomas Pinault	MF	(France)	Grasse	4 December 1981 (aged 19)	10	1	(France) AS Cannes	1 July 1999	Free transfer
17	Bobby Bowry	MF	(Saint Kitts and Nevis)	(England) Hampstead	19 May 1971 (aged 30)	0	0	(England) Millwall	25 July 2001	Free transfer
20	Mick Stockwell	MF	(England)	Chelmsford	14 February 1965 (aged 36)	52	11	(England) Ipswich Town	23 July 2000	Free transfer
23	Matt Hearn	MF	(England)	Barking	17 January 1984 (aged 17)	0	0	Youth team	1 July 2000	Free transfer
25	Marc Canham	MF	(England)	(Germany) Wegberg	11 September 1982 (aged 18)	0	0	Youth team	1 August 2001	Free transfer
Forwards
9	Scott McGleish	FW	(England)	Chipping Barnet	10 February 1974 (aged 27)	38	11	(England) Barnet	12 January 2001	£15,000
16	Dean Morgan	FW	(Montserrat)	(England) Edmonton	3 October 1983 (aged 17)	4	0	Youth team	1 August 2000	Free transfer
21	Kevin Rapley	FW	(England)	Reading	21 September 1977 (aged 23)	0	0	(England) Notts County	1 August 2001	Free transfer
22	Triston Chambers	FW	(England)	Enfield Town	25 December 1982 (aged 18)	0	0	Youth team	20 August 2001	Free transfer
23	Lloyd Opara	FW	(England)	Enfield Town	6 January 1984 (aged 17)	0	0	Youth team	20 August 2001	Free transfer
27	Ben Cranfield	FW	(England)	Ipswich	1 March 1984 (aged 17)	0	0	Youth team	1 August 2001	Free transfer
28	Adrian Coote	FW	(Northern Ireland)	(England) Great Yarmouth	30 September 1978 (aged 22)	0	0	(England) Norwich City	21 December 2001	£50,000

== Transfers ==
=== In ===
Date	Position	Nationality	Name	From	Fee	Ref.
25 July 2001	MF	(Saint Kitts and Nevis)	Bobby Bowry	(England) Millwall	Free transfer	
27 July 2001	DF/MF	(England)	Anthony Allman	(England) Charlton Athletic	Free transfer	
1 August 2001	MF	(England)	Marc Canham	Youth team	Free transfer	
1 August 2001	FW	(England)	Ben Cranfield	Youth team	Free transfer	
1 August 2001	FB	(England)	David Hadrava	Youth team	Free transfer	
1 August 2001	FW	(England)	Lloyd Opara	Youth team	Free transfer	
1 August 2001	FW	(England)	Kevin Rapley	(England) Notts County	Free transfer	
20 August 2001	FW	(England)	Triston Chambers	Youth team	Free transfer	
18 September 2001	CB	(England)	Olly Blackwell	Youth team	Free transfer	
21 December 2001	FW	(Northern Ireland)	Adrian Coote	(England) Norwich City	£50,000	
15 February 2002	FW	(France)	Patrice Tano	(Netherlands) Telstar	Non-contract	
15 March 2002	CB	(Australia)	Con Blatsis	(Norway) Lillestrøm	Non-contract	

- Total spending: ▼ ~ £50,000

=== Out ===
Date	Position	Nationality	Name	To	Fee	Ref.
31 May 2001	MF	(Nigeria)	Sam Okafor	(England) Sittingbourne	Released	
1 July 2001	FW	(England)	Steve McGavin	(England) Dagenham & Redbridge	Released	
4 July 2001	MF/DF	(England)	Aaron Skelton	(England) Luton Town	Free transfer	
1 August 2001	MF	(England)	Andy Arnott	(England) Stevenage Borough	Free transfer	
8 August 2001	FW	(England)	Keith Scott	(England) Dover Athletic	Free transfer	
31 January 2002	CB	(England)	Simon Clark	(Singapore) Woodlands Wellington	Released	
4 March 2002	FW	(France)	Patrice Tano	(Scotland) Falkirk	Free transfer	
18 March 2002	CB	(England)	Olly Blackwell	(England) Billericay Town	Undisclosed	
28 March 2002	GK	(England)	Andy Woodman	(England) Oxford United	Free transfer	

- Total incoming: ▲ ~ £0

=== Loans in ===
Date	Position	Nationality	Name	From	End date	Ref.
14 December 2001	FW	(Republic of Ireland)	Graham Barrett	(England) Arsenal	21 April 2002	
18 January 2002	FB	(England)	John Halls	(England) Arsenal	18 February 2002	
27 March 2002	FW	(England)	Charlie MacDonald	(England) Charlton Athletic	21 April 2002	
28 March 2002	GK	(England)	Richard Knight	(England) Oxford United	21 April 2002	

=== Loans out ===
Date	Position	Nationality	Name	To	End date	Ref.
18 January 2002	GK	(England)	Andy Woodman	(England) Oxford United	18 March 2002	
15 February 2002	MF	(England)	Matt Hearn	(England) Southend United	15 March 2002	

== Match details ==
=== Second Division ===
==== League table ====
Pos	Team	Pld	W	D	L	GF	GA	GD	Pts
13	Swindon Town	46	15	14	17	46	56	−10	59
14	Port Vale	46	16	10	20	51	62	−11	58
15	Colchester United	46	15	12	19	65	76	−11	57
16	Blackpool	46	14	14	18	66	69	−3	56
17	Peterborough United	46	15	10	21	64	59	+5	55

Rules for classification: In the Football League goals scored (GF) takes precedence over goal difference (GD).

==== Results round by round ====
Round	1	2	3	4	5	6	7	8	9	10	11	12	13	14	15	16	17	18	19	20	21	22	23	24	25	26	27	28	29	30	31	32	33	34	35	36	37	38	39	40	41	42	43	44	45	46
Ground	A	H	A	H	A	H	A	H	H	A	A	H	A	H	H	A	H	A	A	H	A	H	H	A	A	H	A	H	A	A	H	H	A	H	H	A	A	H	A	H	A	H	A	H	A	H
Result	W	W	D	W	L	W	L	W	L	L	L	W	L	W	D	L	L	W	D	L	D	W	D	W	L	W	D	L	L	L	L	D	W	D	D	D	L	L	L	W	D	L	W	L	W	D
Position	1	2	2	1	2	2	5	2	4	9	11	7	11	8	8	9	12	9	9	13	12	11	12	12	12	12	10	12	12	12	13	14	12	13	14	15	15	15	16	16	16	17	16	16	16	15

Source: Statto.com (archived)
A = Away; H = Home; W = Win; D = Draw; L = Loss

==== Matches ====
11 August 2001 1	Chesterfield	3–6	Colchester United	Chesterfield
	Willis 10'; Beckett 47'; Payne 55'	Report	Dunne 9'; Booty 26' (o.g.); Stockwell 37'; Rapley 48'; McGleish 62', 78'	Stadium: Saltergate; Attendance: 3,939; Referee: G Cain

18 August 2001 2	Colchester United	2–1	Tranmere Rovers	Colchester
	Rapley 84'; McGleish 89'	Report	Barlow 90' (pen.); Hazell (red card) 87'	Stadium: Layer Road; Attendance: 3,618; Referee: Phil Prosser

25 August 2001 3	Wrexham	1–1	Colchester United	Wrexham
	Edwards 73'; Chalk (yellow card) 45' (red card); Ferguson (yellow card) 65' (red card)	Report	Stockwell 20'	Stadium: Racecourse Ground; Attendance: 2,952; Referee: M Cowburn

27 August 2001 4	Colchester United	2–0	Port Vale	Colchester
15:00 BST	Keith 21'; McGleish 46'	Report		Stadium: Layer Road; Attendance: 3,611; Referee: P Armstrong

1 September 2001 5	Swindon Town	1–0	Colchester United	Swindon
	Ruddock 53'	Report		Stadium: County Ground; Attendance: 4,889; Referee: Rob Harris

8 September 2001 6	Colchester United	3–1	Northampton Town	Colchester
15:00 BST	Rapley 7'; McGleish 8' (pen.); Hope 42' (o.g.); Gregory (red card) 56'	Report	Hargreaves 78'	Stadium: Layer Road; Attendance: 3,705; Referee: Paul Rejer

15 September 2001 7	Bristol City	3–1	Colchester United	Bristol
	Murray 40'; Jones 47'; Clist 87'	Report	Rapley 45'	Stadium: Ashton Gate Stadium; Attendance: 9,992; Referee: Ray Olivier

18 September 2001 8	Colchester United	2–1	Oldham Athletic	Colchester
19:45 BST	Izzet 10'; McGleish 27'	Report	Eyres 81'; J. Sheridan (red card) 71'	Stadium: Layer Road; Attendance: 2,991; Referee: Paul Alcock

22 September 2001 9	Colchester United	0–1	Notts County	Colchester
15:00 BST		Report	Allsopp 62'	Stadium: Layer Road; Attendance: 3,796; Referee: S Tomlin

26 September 2001 10	Stoke City	3–0	Colchester United	Stoke-on-Trent
	Vandeurzen 45'; Þórðarson 57', 90'	Report		Stadium: Britannia Stadium; Attendance: 9,515; Referee: R Pearson

29 September 2001 11	Brentford	4–1	Colchester United	Brentford
	Evans 5', 62' (pen.); Burgess 34'; Owusu 83'; Anderson (yellow card) 87' (red card)	Report	McGleish 17'	Stadium: Griffin Park; Attendance: 5,179; Referee: B Jordan

5 October 2001 12	Colchester United	2–0	Reading	Colchester
19:45 BST	Rapley 8'; McGleish 26'	Report		Stadium: Layer Road; Attendance: 3,691; Referee: Keith Hill

13 October 2001 13	Blackpool	2–1	Colchester United	Blackpool
	Ormerod 50', 90'	Report	Izzet 86'	Stadium: Bloomfield Road; Attendance: 11,097; Referee: Mark Clattenburg

20 October 2001 14	Colchester United	3–1	Cambridge United	Colchester
15:00 BST	McGleish 37', 87'; G. Johnson 42'	Report	Oné 14'	Stadium: Layer Road; Attendance: 4,684; Referee: Phil Dowd

23 October 2001 15	Colchester United	2–2	Wycombe Wanderers	Colchester
19:45 BST	Stockwell 13'; Rapley 28'	Report	Brown 14'; Currie 45'	Stadium: Layer Road; Attendance: 5,186; Referee: Trevor Parkes

27 October 2001 16	Brighton & Hove Albion	1–0	Colchester United	Brighton
	Zamora 16'	Report		Stadium: Withdean Stadium; Attendance: 6,531; Referee: Matt Messias

3 November 2001 17	Colchester United	1–2	AFC Bournemouth	Colchester
15:00 GMT	Duguid 25'	Report	Feeney 13'; Howe 20'; Hayter (yellow card) 87' (red card)	Stadium: Layer Road; Attendance: 4,369; Referee: Mark Warren

9 November 2001 18	Wigan Athletic	2–3	Colchester United	Wigan
	Fitzgerald 52' (o.g.); Liddell 56'	Report	Stockwell 13', 19'; R. Johnson 77'	Stadium: JJB Stadium; Attendance: 5,735; Referee: Graham Laws

20 November 2001 19	Cardiff City	1–1	Colchester United	Cardiff
	Collins 33'	Report	Dunne 87'	Stadium: Ninian Park; Attendance: 8,013; Referee: Clive Wilkes

24 November 2001 20	Colchester United	0–1	Bury	Colchester
15:00 GMT		Report	Newby 82'	Stadium: Layer Road; Attendance: 3,534; Referee: Joe Ross

1 December 2001 21	Queens Park Rangers	2–2	Colchester United	Shepherd's Bush
15:00 GMT	Gallen 22', 54'	Report	Stockwell 29'; Keith 39'	Stadium: Loftus Road; Attendance: 11,158; Referee: P Armstrong

15 December 2001 22	Colchester United	2–1	Peterborough United	Colchester
15:00 GMT	McGleish 8'; White 70'	Report	Edwards 7'	Stadium: Layer Road; Attendance: 3,480; Referee: Peter Jones

22 December 2001 23	Colchester United	3–3	Huddersfield Town	Colchester
15:00 GMT	Duguid 9'; Stockwell 23'; McGleish 74'	Report	Booth 40', 61'; Schofield 59'; Jenkins (red card) 80'	Stadium: Layer Road; Attendance: 3,543; Referee: Lee Cable

26 December 2001 24	Northampton Town	2–3	Colchester United	Northampton
	Hope 36'; Forrester 80'	Report	Sampson 45' (o.g.); Barrett 50', 66'	Stadium: Sixfields Stadium; Attendance: 4,740; Referee: Anthony Bates

29 December 2001 25	Port Vale	3–1	Colchester United	Burslem
	Armstrong 35'; Rowland 39'; Brooker 69'	Report	Duguid 90'	Stadium: Vale Park; Attendance: 4,444; Referee: D Crick

5 January 2002 26	Colchester United	2–1	Wrexham	Colchester
	Stockwell 12'; Bowry 78'	Report	Thomas 29'	Stadium: Layer Road; Attendance: 2,835; Referee: Keith Hill

12 January 2002 27	Tranmere Rovers	0–0	Colchester United	Birkenhead
	Allen (red card) 53'	Report		Stadium: Prenton Park; Attendance: 8,387; Referee: Mike Pike

19 January 2002 28	Colchester United	1–2	Chesterfield	Colchester
15:00 GMT	Barrett 49'; Duguid (yellow card) 54' (red card)	Report	Burt 17'; Hurst 75'	Stadium: Layer Road; Attendance: 4,060; Referee: Paul Danson

22 January 2002 29	Huddersfield Town	2–1	Colchester United	Huddersfield
	Schofield 5', 25'	Report	White 83'	Stadium: Kirklees Stadium; Attendance: 7,179; Referee: M Cooper

26 January 2002 30	Reading	3–0	Colchester United	Reading
15:00 GMT	Forster 38' (pen.), 69'; Hughes 48'	Report		Stadium: Madejski Stadium; Attendance: 12,743; Referee: Paul Taylor

30 January 2002 31	Colchester United	1–3	Swindon Town	Colchester
	Keith 41' (pen.)	Report	Gurney 61' (pen.), 74'; Sabin 63'	Stadium: Layer Road; Attendance: 3,132; Referee: B Jordan

2 February 2002 32	Colchester United	1–1	Brentford	Colchester
15:00 GMT	Coote 66'	Report	Owusu 25'	Stadium: Layer Road; Attendance: 3,657; Referee: M Fletcher

9 February 2002 33	Cambridge United	1–2	Colchester United	Cambridge
15:00 GMT	Youngs 1'	Report	Coote 68'; Rapley 85'	Stadium: Abbey Stadium; Attendance: 3,954; Referee: Paul Alcock

16 February 2002 34	Colchester United	1–1	Blackpool	Colchester
15:00 GMT	Keith 72' (pen.)	Report	Walker 41'	Stadium: Layer Road; Attendance: 3,553; Referee: Phil Joslin

23 February 2002 35	Colchester United	0–0	Bristol City	Colchester
15:00 GMT		Report		Stadium: Layer Road; Attendance: 3,558; Referee: A Butler

26 February 2002 36	Notts County	1–1	Colchester United	Nottingham
	Allsopp 51'	Report	White 36'	Stadium: Meadow Lane; Attendance: 3,140; Referee: Graham Salisbury

26 February 2002 37	Oldham Athletic	4–1	Colchester United	Oldham
	Smart 24'; Murray 44'; Eyres 77'; Corazzin 90'	Report	Izzet 12'	Stadium: Boundary Park; Attendance: 5,457; Referee: Howard Webb

5 March 2002 38	Colchester United	1–3	Stoke City	Colchester
19:45 GMT	Duguid 54'	Report	Guðjónsson 42'; Burton 45', 80'	Stadium: Layer Road; Attendance: 3,866; Referee: D Crick

9 March 2002 39	Peterborough United	3–1	Colchester United	Peterborough
	Farrell 26'; Greene 39'; McKenzie 77'	Report	Barrett 87'	Stadium: London Road Stadium; Attendance: 4,625; Referee: S Tomlin

16 March 2002 40	Colchester United	3–1	Queens Park Rangers	Colchester
15:00 GMT	Rapley 12', 85'; McGleish 53'	Report	Doudou 90'	Stadium: Layer Road; Attendance: 4,903; Referee: Lee Cable

23 March 2002 41	Wycombe Wanderers	0–0	Colchester United	High Wycombe
15:00 GMT		Report		Stadium: Adams Park; Attendance: 6,737; Referee: Scott Mathieson

30 March 2002 42	Colchester United	1–4	Brighton & Hove Albion	Colchester
15:00 GMT	Stockwell 88'	Report	Carpenter 23', 90'; Gray 27'; Brooker 29'	Stadium: Layer Road; Attendance: 4,881; Referee: Peter Jones

2 April 2002 43	AFC Bournemouth	0–1	Colchester United	Bournemouth
		Report	Maher 62' (o.g.)	Stadium: Dean Court; Attendance: 4,908; Referee: Trevor Parkes

6 April 2002 44	Colchester United	0–1	Cardiff City	Colchester
15:00 BST		Report	Prior 20'	Stadium: Layer Road; Attendance: 3,970; Referee: Paul Danson

13 April 2002 45	Bury	1–3	Colchester United	Bury
	Billy 74'	Report	McGleish 45'; Coote 72', 87'	Stadium: Gigg Lane; Attendance: 5,014; Referee: Ray Olivier

20 April 2002 46	Colchester United	2–2	Wigan Athletic	Colchester
15:00 BST	McGleish 42'; MacDonald 45'	Report	Roberts 60', 86'	Stadium: Layer Road; Attendance: 3,672; Referee: Steve Baines

=== Football League Cup ===
21 August 2001 1st round	Portsmouth	1–2	Colchester United	Portsmouth
	Crouch 77'	Report	Stockwell 53'; Izzet 82'	Stadium: Fratton Park; Attendance: 7,078; Referee: Paul Taylor

11 September 2001 2nd round	Colchester United	1–3	Barnsley	Colchester
19:45 BST	Keith 72'	Report	Dyer 27', 90'; Jones 88'	Stadium: Layer Road; Attendance: 3,442; Referee: D Crick

=== Football League Trophy ===
16 October 2001 1st round (southern section)	Colchester United	1–0	Swindon Town	Colchester
19:45 BST	Izzet 49'	Report		Stadium: Layer Road; Attendance: 1,251; Referee: Grant Hegley

30 October 2001 2nd round (southern section)	Reading	2–1	Colchester United	Reading
	N. Smith 45'; Henderson 72'	Report	Stockwell 77'	Stadium: Madejski Stadium; Attendance: 2,725; Referee: Andy Hall

=== FA Cup ===
17 November 2001 1st round	Colchester United	0–0	York City	Colchester
15:00 GMT		Report		Stadium: Layer Road; Attendance: 3,350; Referee: Steve Baines

27 November 2001 1st round replay	York City	2–2 (a.e.t.) (3–2 p)	Colchester United	York
	Brass 8'; Potter 84'	Report	McGleish 81'; Duguid 90'	Stadium: Bootham Crescent; Attendance: 2,014; Referee: Steve Baines

== Squad statistics ==
=== Appearances and goals ===
No.	Pos	Nat	Player	Total		Second Division		FA Cup		League Cup		Football League Trophy	
No.	Pos	Nat	Player	Apps	Goals	Apps	Goals	Apps	Goals	Apps	Goals	Apps	Goals
1	GK	(England) ENG	Simon Brown	21	0	19	0	0	0	0	0	2	0
2	DF	(Republic of Ireland) IRL	Joe Dunne	10	2	6+2	2	0+1	0	1	0	0	0
3	DF	(England) ENG	Joe Keith	47	5	33+8	4	2	0	2	1	1+1	0
4	MF	(England) ENG	Gavin Johnson	24	1	19+1	1	2	0	0	0	2	0
5	DF	(England) ENG	Ross Johnson	19	1	13+3	1	2	0	0	0	1	0
6	DF	(Australia) AUS	Con Blatsis	7	0	7	0	0	0	0	0	0	0
7	MF	(England) ENG	Karl Duguid	45	5	36+5	4	2	1	1	0	1	0
8	MF	(England) ENG	David Gregory	19	0	15+1	0	0	0	2	0	1	0
9	FW	(England) ENG	Scott McGleish	52	16	44+2	15	2	1	2	0	2	0
10	MF	(England) ENG	Kemal Izzet	45	5	36+4	3	1	0	2	1	2	1
12	DF	(Republic of Ireland) IRL	Scott Fitzgerald	42	0	36+1	0	2	0	2	0	1	0
15	MF	(France) FRA	Thomas Pinault	48	0	37+5	0	2	0	2	0	2	0
16	FW	(Montserrat) MSR	Dean Morgan	34	0	1+29	0	0+2	0	0	0	1+1	0
17	MF	(Saint Kitts and Nevis) SKN	Bobby Bowry	41	1	27+9	1	1	0	0+2	0	2	0
19	DF	(England) ENG	Alan White	35	3	28+5	3	0+1	0	0+1	0	0	0
20	MF	(England) ENG	Mick Stockwell	52	11	45+1	9	2	0	2	1	1+1	1
21	FW	(England) ENG	Kevin Rapley	40	9	26+9	9	2	0	2	0	1	0
22	FW	(England) ENG	Triston Chambers	1	0	0+1	0	0	0	0	0	0	0
23	FW	(England) ENG	Lloyd Opara	3	0	0+1	0	0+1	0	0	0	0+1	0
25	MF	(England) ENG	Marc Canham	1	0	0+1	0	0	0	0	0	0	0
26	DF	(England) ENG	David Hadrava	1	0	0	0	0	0	0	0	0+1	0
28	FW	(Northern Ireland) NIR	Adrian Coote	19	4	5+14	4	0	0	0	0	0	0
Players who appeared for Colchester who left during the season
6	DF	(England) ENG	Simon Clark	25	0	19+2	0	0	0	2	0	2	0
11	FW	(Republic of Ireland) IRL	Graham Barrett	20	4	19+1	4	0	0	0	0	0	0
29	GK	(England) ENG	Andy Woodman	30	0	26	0	2	0	2	0	0	0
30	DF	(England) ENG	John Halls	6	0	6	0	0	0	0	0	0	0
30	FW	(England) ENG	Charlie MacDonald	4	1	2+2	1	0	0	0	0	0	0
31	GK	(England) ENG	Richard Knight	1	0	1	0	0	0	0	0	0	0

=== Goalscorers ===
Place	Number	Nationality	Position	Name	Second Division	FA Cup	League Cup	Football League Trophy	Total
1	9	(England)	FW	Scott McGleish	15	1	0	0	16
2	20	(England)	MF	Mick Stockwell	9	0	1	1	11
3	21	(England)	FW	Kevin Rapley	9	0	0	0	9
4	3	(England)	FB	Joe Keith	4	0	1	0	5
4	7	(England)	MF	Karl Duguid	4	1	0	0	5
4	10	(England)	MF	Kemal Izzet	3	0	1	1	5
7	11	(Republic of Ireland)	FW	Graham Barrett	4	0	0	0	4
7	28	(Northern Ireland)	FW	Adrian Coote	4	0	0	0	4
9	19	(England)	CB	Alan White	3	0	0	0	3
10	2	(Republic of Ireland)	FB	Joe Dunne	2	0	0	0	2
11	4	(England)	MF	Gavin Johnson	1	0	0	0	1
11	5	(England)	CB	Ross Johnson	1	0	0	0	1
11	17	(Saint Kitts and Nevis)	MF	Bobby Bowry	1	0	0	0	1
11	30	(England)	FW	Charlie MacDonald	1	0	0	0	1
				Own goals	4	0	0	0	4
				TOTALS	65	2	3	2	72

=== Disciplinary record ===
Number	Nationality	Position	Name	Second Division		FA Cup		League Cup		Football League Trophy		Total	
Number	Nationality	Position	Name	Booked	Sent off (straight red)	Booked	Sent off (straight red)	Booked	Sent off (straight red)	Booked	Sent off (straight red)	Booked	Sent off (straight red)
7	(England)	MF	Karl Duguid	6	1	0	0	0	0	0	0	6	1
15	(France)	MF	Thomas Pinault	7	0	0	0	1	0	1	0	9	0
19	(France)	CB	Alan White	7	0	0	0	0	0	0	0	7	0
17	(Saint Kitts and Nevis)	MF	Bobby Bowry	6	0	0	0	0	0	0	0	6	0
10	(England)	MF	Kemal Izzet	4	0	0	0	1	0	0	0	5	0
4	(England)	MF	Gavin Johnson	3	0	1	0	0	0	0	0	4	0
6	(England)	CB	Simon Clark	3	0	0	0	1	0	0	0	4	0
28	(Northern Ireland)	FW	Adrian Coote	4	0	0	0	0	0	0	0	4	0
3	(England)	FB	Joe Keith	3	0	0	0	0	0	0	0	3	0
8	(England)	MF	David Gregory	0	1	0	0	0	0	0	0	0	1
9	(England)	FW	Scott McGleish	3	0	0	0	0	0	0	0	3	0
2	(Republic of Ireland)	FB	Joe Dunne	2	0	0	0	0	0	0	0	2	0
6	(Australia)	CB	Con Blatsis	2	0	0	0	0	0	0	0	2	0
5	(England)	CB	Ross Johnson	1	0	0	0	0	0	0	0	1	0
11	(Republic of Ireland)	FW	Graham Barrett	1	0	0	0	0	0	0	0	1	0
12	(Republic of Ireland)	CB	Scott Fitzgerald	1	0	0	0	0	0	0	0	1	0
16	(Montserrat)	FW	Dean Morgan	1	0	0	0	0	0	0	0	1	0
21	(England)	FW	Kevin Rapley	1	0	0	0	0	0	0	0	1	0
29	(England)	GK	Andy Woodman	1	0	0	0	0	0	0	0	1	0
			TOTALS	56	2	1	0	3	0	1	0	61	2

=== Clean sheets ===
Number of games goalkeepers kept a clean sheet.

Place	Number	Nationality	Player	Second Division	FA Cup	League Cup	Football League Trophy	Total
1	1	(England)	Simon Brown	4	0	0	1	5
2	29	(England)	Andy Woodman	2	1	0	0	3
			TOTALS	6	1	0	1	8

=== Player debuts ===
Players making their first-team Colchester United debut in a fully competitive match.

Number	Position	Nationality	Player	Date	Opponent	Ground	Notes
17	MF	(Saint Kitts and Nevis)	Bobby Bowry	11 August 2001	Chesterfield	Saltergate	
21	FW	(England)	Kevin Rapley	11 August 2001	Chesterfield	Saltergate	
23	FW	(England)	Lloyd Opara	13 October 2001	Blackpool	Bloomfield Road	
26	FB	(England)	David Hadrava	30 October 2001	Reading	Madejski Stadium	
11	FW	(Republic of Ireland)	Graham Barrett	15 December 2001	Peterborough United	Layer Road	
28	FW	(Northern Ireland)	Adrian Coote	22 December 2001	Huddersfield Town	Layer Road	
30	FB	(England)	John Halls	19 January 2002	Chestefield	Layer Road	
6	CB	(Australia)	Con Blatsis	16 March 2002	Queens Park Rangers	Layer Road	
30	FW	(England)	Charlie MacDonald	30 March 2002	Brighton & Hove Albion	Layer Road	
22	FW	(England)	Triston Chambers	6 April 2002	Cardiff City	Layer Road	
25	MF	(England)	Marc Canham	6 April 2002	Cardiff City	Layer Road	
31	GK	(England)	Richard Knight	13 April 2002	Bury	Gigg Lane	

== See also ==
- List of Colchester United F.C. seasons
