= Marc Canham =

Marc Canham may refer to:

- Marc Canham (footballer) (born 1982), English footballer
- Marc Canham (composer) (born 1977), British music composer
