= Melchor Menor =

American Muay Thai kickboxer (born 1974)

- Born: April 14, 1974 (age 52); Manila, Philippines
- Other names: Mr.
- Nationality: American
- Height: 5 ft 7 in (1.70 m)
- Weight: 143 lb (65 kg; 10.2 st)
- Division: Welterweight
- Style: Muay Thai, Kickboxing
- Fighting out of: San Diego, California

Melchor "Mel" Menor is an American Muay Thai kickboxer. Menor has also won the WKA Super Elite Class World Champion 1994–1997, WMTF Jr WelterWeight Muay Thai Champion 1997 and the K-U Super Elite Class World Champion 1999. Menor has also appeared on television shows such as Fight Science and Stan Lee's Superhumans including the film Here Comes the Boom.

== Fight record ==
Kickboxing Record
Date	Result	Opponent	Event	Location	Method	Round	Time
2002-10-11	Loss	(Japan) Takehiro Murahama	K-1 World MAX 2002 USA	Tokyo, Japan	Decision (Unanimous)	3	
2002-05-03	Win	(United States) Danny Steele	K-1 World Grand Prix 2002 Preliminary USA	Las Vegas, Nevada	Decision (Unanimous)	5	
2001-08-11	Win	(United States) William Syrapai	K-1 World Grand Prix 2001	Las Vegas, Nevada	Decision (Unanimous)	5	
2001-06-03	Loss	(Thailand) Robert Kaennorasing	Warriors Cup 3	Burbank, California, USA	Decision (Unanimous)	3	3:00
2000-09-09	Loss	(Thailand) Jaroenthong Kiatbanchong	Warriors Cup of America	Irvine, California, United States	Decision (Unanimous)	5	3:00
2000-05-26	Loss	(Japan) Masato	Colosseum 2000	Japan	TKO (Referee Stoppage)	4	2:59
1997-07-	Win	(France) Nicholas Read	WORLD CHAMPIONSHIP A MATTER OF PRIDE 3	Los Angeles, CA	Decision	5	
1996-10-11	Win	(United States) Danny Steele	Super Brawl II	Honolulu, Hawaii	TKO (Doctor stoppage)	5	
Legend: Win Loss Draw/No contest Notes
