= Kemal Izzet =

English football player and manager

Personal information
- Date of birth: 29 September 1980 (age 46)
- Place of birth: Mile End, England
- Height: 1.73 m (5 ft 8 in)
- Position: Midfielder

Youth career
- Senrab
- –1998: Charlton Athletic

Senior career*
Years	Team	Apps	(Gls)
1998–2001	Charlton Athletic	0	(0)
2001	→ Colchester United (loan)	2	(0)
2001–2013	Colchester United	420	(18)
2013–2017	Needham Market	120	(16)
Total		542	(34)

Managerial career
- 2017–2018: Stanway Rovers
- 2019–2020: Brightlingsea Regent
- * Club domestic league appearances and goals

Kemal "Kem" Izzet (/ˈɪzɪt/; born 29 September 1980) is an English football coach and former professional player. He most notably played for Colchester United between 2001 and 2013, where he made over 400 league appearances. He was previously on the books at Charlton Athletic but failed to break into the first-team setup at The Valley. He spent three years with Needham Market after leaving Colchester.

== Playing career ==
=== Charlton Athletic ===
Izzet started his career with Premier League club Charlton Athletic and played in the youth system. However, he did not break into the first team at Charlton Athletic. He had previously played for London-based Sunday league side Senrab alongside Jermain Defoe, Ledley King, Jlloyd Samuel, John Terry and Bobby Zamora.

=== Colchester United ===
In February 2001, Izzet went on trial with the Second Division side Reading, alongside Anthony Allman. The following month, he joined Colchester United on a one-month loan period.

After quickly impressing the club's reserve team, Izzet made his Colchester United debut, coming on as a 31st-minute substitute, in a 3–1 win against Luton Town on 31 March 2001. Just into making two appearances for the club, he joined Colchester United on a permanent basis. Having set a target to score his first goal for the club, Izzet's target came true when he scored the equalising goal, in a 2–2 draw against Peterborough United on 17 April 2001. After the match, he said: "Now I've opened my account I hope it's the first of many." However, in a 2–1 win against Reading on 28 April 2001, Izzet suffered an injury and did not play for the rest of the 2000–01 season. At the end of the 2000–01 season, he made six appearances and scoring once in all competitions.

At the start of the 2001–02 season, Izzet was given Colchester United's number 10 shirt following the departure of Steve McGavin. He began to establish himself in the first team, playing in the midfield position. On 21 August 2001, Izzet scored his first goal of the season, which turned out to be a winning goal against Portsmouth in the first round of the League Cup. The club's manager Steve Whitton praised both and Thomas Pinault’s performances, due to "their skillful and competitive midfields in the league". On 18 September 2001, he scored his first league goal of the season, in a 2–1 win against Oldham Athletic. Izzet scored on 13 October 2001 and 16 October 2001 against Blackpool and Swindon Town respectively. However, during the FA Cup match against York City, he suffered a damaged ankle ligaments and was substituted in the 38th minute, as Colchester United drew 0–0. After being out for a month, Izzet returned from injury, coming on as a 64th-minute substitute, in a 3–2 win against Northampton Town on 26 December 2001. Later that year, he was linked with Ipswich Town and Leicester City but was happy to stay with the club. Following his return from injury, Izzet said his aim was to help Colchester United reach the Second Division play–offs and resumed his place in the first team. He also began to play "wearing a lightweight cast to protect his broken wrist injury". On 2 March 2002, he scored his fifth goal of the season, in a 4–1 loss against Oldham Athletic. On 19 March 2002, Izzet ended the transfer speculation by signing a long-term contract with the club. In his first full season at Colchester United, he made forty–five appearances and scoring five goals in all competitions.

Despite suffering from a minor back injury at the start of the 2002–03 season, Izzet continued to remain in the first team, playing in the midfield position. He then scored his first goals of the season, in a 2–0 win against Chesterfield on 18 October 2002. Throughout October, Izzet played through with a broken wrist and it was emerged in late–November that saw him out for weeks. On 14 December 2002, he made his return from his injury, starting the whole game, in a 2–1 win against Luton Town. Izzet scored on 26 December 2002 and 28 December 2002 against Peterborough United and Blackpool respectively. He, once again, scored on 15 March 2003 and 18 March 2003 against Huddersfield Town and Chesterfield. Izzet scored his seventh goal of the season, in a 1–0 win against Swindon Town two weeks later on 29 March 2003. He scored his eighth goal of the season, in a 3–0 win against Cardiff City on 19 April 2003. At the end of the 2002–03 season, Izzet made forty–eight appearances and scoring eight goals in all competitions. For his performances, he finished second place in Colchester United/Evening Gazette Supporters' Player-of-the-Year. But Izzet won his second award for the club's Young Player of the Year. Reflecting on his injury, he said: "Let's hope all my troubles are behind me now. I had quite a big piece of bone taken off my hip and grafted into the wrist and although I can't move it at all everything is going well. The doctors tell me the bone will quickly grow back on my hip again and I should be as good as new in two to three weeks’ time.”

Ahead of the 2003–04 season, Izzet said he could not wait for the new season, while also recovering from his injuries. Izzet continued to remain in the first team, playing in the midfield position. However, in mid–October, he suffered an injury that saw him out for one match. But Izzet made his return from injury, starting the whole game, in a 2–0 loss against Grimsby Town on 18 October 2003. However, his return was short–lived when he suffered an injury and was out for one match. But on 22 November 2003, Izzet returned from injury, coming on as a 59th-minute substitute, in a 4–0 loss against Rushden & Diamonds. On 31 January 2004, he scored an equalising goal in the 89th minute to earn Colchester United a point, in a 1–1 draw against Tranmere Rovers. Izzet scored on 17 February 2004 and 21 February 2004 against Southend United and Grimsby Town respectively. Following the match, he said his aim is to help the club aim for a place in the Second Division promotion play-off. A month later, on 20 March 2004, Izzet scored an equalising goal, in an eventual 2–1 loss against Brighton & Hove Albion. On 21 April 2004, he signed a two–year contract extension with Colchester United. At the end of the 2003–04 season, Izzet went on to make fifty–six appearances and scoring three goals in all competitions.

However, at the start of the 2004–05 season, Izzet suffered a stomach muscle problem and ankle injury that saw him out for months. By October, he made a recovery from his injuries and fully fit to make a first team return. On 16 October 2004, Izzet made his return from injury, starting the whole game, in a 1–1 draw against Blackpool. Following his return from his injuries, he said his determination to score more goals for Colchester United. However, Izzet missed most of the 2004–05 season owing to an ankle injury that required surgery. By April, he made his return to training and was working towards his recovery. Izzet made his return from his injury, coming on as an 84th-minute substitute, on the last game of the season against Torquay United and helped the club win 2–1. At the end of the 2004–05 season, he made four appearances in all competitions.

Izzet recovered for the 2005–06 season and regained his first team place, playing in the midfield position. On 9 October 2005, he set up a winning goal for Greg Halford, who scored twice, in a 2–1 win against Blackpool. By December, Izzet's form soon dipped and was dropped to the substitute bench. Despite this, he remained a key member of the team that challenged for promotion that season. However, Izzet suffered ankle injury in February that saw him out for a month. On 3 March 2006, he signed a contract extension with Colchester United. On 4 March 2006, Izzet made his return from injury, starting the match, in a 3–0 loss against Southend United. However, his return was short–lived when he received a straight red card in the 87th minute, in a 1–0 loss against Oldham Athletic on 11 March 2006 and served a one match suspension. By April, Izzet suffered ankle injury that saw him out for a month. On the last game of the season against Yeovil Town, he came on as a 76th-minute substitute and played the remainder of the match, in a 0–0 draw, a result that saw the club promoted to the Championship. At the end of the 2005–06 season, Izzet made forty–one appearances in all competitions.

Ahead of the 2006–07 season, Izzet believed that Colchester United have two “seret weapons” to compete in the Championship and is looking to play more in the first team. Since the start of the 2006–07 season, he continued to regain his first team place, playing in the midfield position alongside Kevin Watson. Izzet also began to suffer from goal drought that saw him score goals for the club. He then scored his first Championship goal, in a 1–1 draw against Birmingham City on 3 February 2007. This was his first goal in over three years. Since the start of the 2006–07 season, Izzet played in every league matches for Colchester United until he missed one match, due to him picking up five yellow cards this season. After serving a one match suspension, Izzet returned to the starting line–up, in a 0–0 draw against Burnley on 24 February 2007. Following his return, he helped the club achieved a 10th-place finish in the league, defying the odds and a club record best ever league finish. At the end of the 2006–07 season, Izzet made forty–seven appearances and scoring once in all competitions.

Ahead of the 2007–08 season, Izzet revealed that he had talks with Colchester United over a new contract. At the start of the 2007–08 season, Izzet continued to be in the first team regular, playing in the midfield position. His performance against Preston North End on 29 August 2007 resulted in him being named Coca-Cola Championship's Team of the Week, alongside Wayne Brown. However, during a match against Blackpool, on 22 September 2007, he suffered a knock and was substituted at half–time. But Izzet quickly recovered and scored his first goal of the season, in a 4–2 win against Queens Park Rangers on 3 October 2007. Since the start of the 2007–08 season, he was featured in every league matches until missing one match, due to picking up his fifth booking of the season. After serving a one match suspension, Izzet returned to the starting line–up, in a 1–1 draw against Norwich City on 15 December 2007. However, in the club's second meeting against Queens Park Rangers on 22 December 2007, Izzet suffered a finger injury and was substituted in the 36th minute, as Colchester United loss 2–1. After being out for two matches, he returned to the first team, coming on as a second–half substitute, in a 2–1 win against Charlton Athletic on 1 January 2008. After a lengthy negotiations, Izzet signed a contract extension with the club on 28 January 2008. At that time, he was Colchester United's second longest serving player behind Karl Duguid. However, Izzet was unable to help the club avoid relegation to League One, as they finished 24th place in the league. At the end of the 2007–08 season, he went on to make forty appearances and scoring once in all competitions.

Ahead of the 2008–09 season, Izzet said he expressed his optimism to help Colchester United bounce back and help the club win the promotion. Izzet captained Colchester United for the first time against Huddersfield Town on 16 August 2008 and led the club to a 0–0 draw. Since the start of the 2008–09 season, he continued to be in the first team regular, playing in the midfield position. On 21 October 2008, he scored his first goal of the season, in a 2–1 loss against Millwall. However, the following month saw Izzet suffer a shoulder injury that saw him out for one match. On 22 November 2008, he made his return from injury, starting the whole game, in a 2–1 loss against Peterborough United. In a follow–up match against Yeovil Town, Izzet suffered a hamstring injury and was substituted at half–time. But he recovered and appeared as a 73rd-minute substitute, in a 2–1 win against Northampton Town on 29 November 2008. In February 2009, Izzet then missed one match due to picking up five yellow cards this season. After serving a one match suspension, he returned to the starting line–up, in a 2–0 loss against Walsall on 14 February 2009. The following saw Izzet captain in a number of matches for Colchester United. Despite his optimism, the club were unsuccessful of their attempts to bounce back to the Championship. At the end of the 2008–09 season, he went on to make forty–eight appearances and scoring once in all competitions. By the end of the 2008–09 season, Izzet had made over 330 league and cup appearances for Colchester United.

In the opening game of the 2009–10 season, Izzet set up Colchester United's seventh goal of the game, in a 7–1 victory against Colchester's recently relegated rivals Norwich City. However, in a match against Southampton on 5 September 2009, he received a straight red card in a 36th minute for a violent conduct on Adam Lallana, in a 0–0 draw. After serving a three match suspension, Izzet returned to the starting line–up, in a 3–0 win against Charlton Athletic on 29 September 2009. By the end of the year, he found himself out of the first team, due to injuries on three separate occasions. On 25 February 2010, Izzet signed a contract extension with the club, keeping him until 2012. Shortly after, he missed one match as a result of his absent. Izzet made his return to the starting line–up, in a 0–0 draw against Brighton & Hove Albion on 8 March 2010. However, his return was short–lived when he missed two matches after picking up his tenth booking of the season. After serving a two match suspension, Izzet made his return to the starting line–up, in a 3–3 draw against Brentford on 23 March 2010. At the end of the 2009–10 season, he made forty–one appearances in all competitions.

In the 2010–11 season, it was announced that Izzet was named as a new captain of Colchester United. He set up a goal for Andy Bond, in a 1–1 draw against Sheffield Wednesday on 14 August 2010. On 28 September 2010, Izzet made his 345th league appearance for the club, in a 2–2 draw against Dagenham & Redbridge. Since the start of the 2010–11 season, he started in every matches for Colchester United, playing in the midfield position. However, Izzet suffered injuries on two separate occasions by the end of the year. After being dropped for two matches, Izzet returned to the starting line–up for a match against Oldham Athletic on 22 March 2011 and set up a goal for Ashley Vincent, who scored the only goal of the game. At the end of the 2010–11 season, he went on to make forty–seven appearances in all competitions. Shortly after, Izzet was inducted into Colchester's Hall of Fame in 2011 prior to the final game of the season for his testimonial year.

The first two matches of the 2011–12 season saw Izzet assisted on 6 August 2011 and 9 August 2011 against Preston North End and Wycombe Wanderers respectively. However, Colchester United's poor form in defence prompted Izzet to acknowledge the mistakes for his responsibilities. Since the start of the 2011–12 season, Izzet rotated between the starting line–up and substitute bench. By February, he soon regained his place in the first team despite being out on three separate occasions along the way. On 3 March 2012, Izzet made his 400th league appearance for Colchester United, in a 3–0 win against Preston North End. At the end of the 2011–12 season, he went on to make thirty–eight appearances in all competitions. Shortly after, Izzet was named CUSA home player-of-the-season. On 3 July 2012, he signed a new contract, having made over 400 league appearances since signing in 2001 and just played his testimonial season.

In the 2012–13 season, Izzet continued to remain as the captain of Colchester United. However, at the start of the 2012–13 season, he found himself place on the substitute bench, as well as, his own injury concern. Izzet was out further when he suffered a hip injury that saw him out for six weeks. On 15 December 2012, he made his return from injury, starting the match, in a 1–0 loss against AFC Bournemouth. Two weeks later, on 26 December 2012, Izzet set up the club's only goal of the game, in a 3–1 loss against Brentford. However, his return was short–lived when he suffered ankle injury that kept him out for a month. But on 26 February 2013, Izzet returned from injury, playing for Colchester United's reserve team, in a 4–3 loss against Ipswich Town's reserve team. Izzet did not play for the club again until the last game of the season against Carlisle United, coming on as a late substitute, in a 2–0 win, a result that saw Colchester United retain their League One status. At the end of the 2012–13 season, he went on to make twelve appearances in all competitions.

Izzet brought an end to his 12-year stay with Colchester United on 2 September 2013, leaving the club by mutual consent. He left Colchester United having received his testimonial in 2012 and a runners-up medal from the club's promotion to the Championship in 2006. Having failed to make an appearance for the first-team in the 2013–14 season, Izzet decided to end his long association with the U's in order to look for regular football at a new club.

=== Needham Market ===
After leaving Colchester, Izzet joined local Isthmian League Division One North club Needham Market on 10 September, beginning his time with the club on the bench alongside fellow ex-U's player Jamie Guy. Despite interest from Football League clubs including Exeter City, he instead chose to invest his financial settlement agreed with Colchester after ending his contract in setting up a football school business, with help from financial advisor and Needham Market manager Mark Morsley.

Izzet scored on his debut for the club, in a 2–1 win against Brantham Athletic in the first qualifying round of the FA Cup on 14 September 2013. On 19 October 2013, he scored his second goal for Needham Market, in a 2–1 loss against Redbridge. Since joining the club, Izzet became a first team regular, playing in the midfield position, as well as, captain. A month later, on 23 November 2013, he scored his third goal of the season, in a 4–0 win against Waltham Abbey. Three weeks later, on 11 December 2013, Izzet scored his fourth goal of the season, in a 4–0 win against Waltham Forest. Two months later, on 21 February 2014, he scored his fifth goal of the season from a penalty spot, in a 2–1 win against Heybridge Swifts. Izzet then scored from a penalty spot on 9 April 2014, 12 April 2014 and 15 April 2014 against Erith & Belvedere, Tilbury and A.F.C. Sudbury respectively. At the end of the 2013–14 season, he went on to make forty–one appearances and scoring eight goals in all competitions.

In the 2014–15 season, Izzet continued to be a first team regular for Needham Market, playing in the midfield position, as well as, retaining his captaincy. On 23 August 2014, he scored his first goal of the season, coming from a penalty spot, before being sent–off for a second bookable offence, in a 5–3 win against Tilbury. On 11 October 2014, Izzet scored his second goal of the season, coming from a penalty spot, in a 2–1 loss against Witham Town. On 1 November 2014, he scored his third goal of the season, coming from a penalty spot, in a 5–0 win against Burnham Ramblers. On 7 February 2015, Izzet scored his fourth goal of the season, coming from a penalty spot, in a 6–2 win against Romford. On 3 March 2015, he scored his fifth goal of the season, coming from a penalty spot, in a 1–0 win against Tilbury. On the last game of the season, Izzet scored from a penalty spot, in a 5–0 win against Chatham Town, resulting in Needham Market winning the Ryman Division One North title. At the end of the 2014–15 season, he made forty–five appearances and scoring six goals in all competitions.

At the start of the 2015–16 season, Izzet scored from a penalty spot, in a 3–3 draw against Tonbridge Angels on 15 August 2015. He then scored his second goal of the season, coming from a penalty spot, in a 4–2 loss against Harrow Borough on 19 September 2015. However, Izzet suffered Achilles injury that saw him out for weeks. After returning from injury, he continued to remain in the first team, playing in the midfield position. On 12 December 2015, Izzet scored his third goal of the season, coming from a penalty spot, in a 3–2 loss against Enfield Town. On 5 April 2016, he scored his fourth goal of the season, coming from a penalty spot, in a 2–1 win against Canvey Island. At the end of the 2015–16 season, Izzet made thirty–four appearances and scoring four goals in all competitions. After making 120 appearances and scoring 16 goals, Izzet left the club after his role as academy manager was effectively removed following restructuring. But he remained as a player due to having one year left to his contract and was placed on a transfer list instead.

The start of the 2016–17 season saw Izzet out with an injury. After being out for a month, he scored on his return, scoring from a penalty spot, in a 2–0 win against Lowestoft Town on 11 October 2016. After the match, manager Mark Morsley praised his performance and his return form. Izzet scored two more goals by the end of the year, both coming from penalties against Hendon and A.F.C. Sudbury. He later scored twice against Bognor Regis Town, both coming from penalties, on two separate occasions on 17 January 2017 and 25 February 2017. Izzet soon won his place in the first team, playing in the midfield position. He scored the penalty and helped Needham Market beat Leiston 4–2 on penalties to reach the Suffolk Premier Cup final. It was announced on 14 April 2017 that Izzet would be leaving the club at the end of the 2016–17 season, which he said he want to leave Needham Market with a bang by reaching the play–offs. On 8 May 2017, Izzet led the club to win the Suffolk Premier Cup final by beating Lowestoft Town 3–2, in what turns out to be his last appearance for Needham Market. Following this, he retired from professional football.

== Managerial career ==
Izzet was also studying towards his UEFA B Licence in the latter stages of his Colchester career and continued working toward coaching badge with Needham. In January 2014, he opened his first football school called Kem Izzet Soccer Academy. In December 2014, Izzet was appointed as a new manager of Brantham Athletic centre, having also worked for Football Careers Centre (FCC).

=== Stanway Rovers ===
On 11 May 2017, Izzet was appointed manager of Eastern Counties League club Stanway Rovers as player manager. He was joined by his former teammate, Karl Duguid as the assistant manager. Izzet said his aim is to "put heavy emphasis on youth development" at Stanway Rovers.

His first match as manager came on 29 July 2017, in a 3–1 loss against Thetford Town. On 27 October 2017, Izzet led the club to a 9–0 win against Wivenhoe Town. He led Stanway Rovers to the League Challenge Cup semi-finals, but the club was eliminated by Brantham Athletic. Izzet led Stanway Rovers to an eighth-place finish, which saw the club was transferred to the Essex Senior League.

At the end of the 2017–18 season, Izzet left Stanway. Following this, he was appointed as a new first team coach at East Thurrock United.

=== Brightlingsea Regent ===
Izzett was appointed manager of Brightlingsea Regent on 15 October 2019.

His first match in charge as manager of Brightlingsea Regent came on 19 October 2019, losing 3–0 against Worthing. The club soon found themselves in a relegation zone in Izzet's first two months as a Brightlingsea Regent manager. His first win as a manager of the club came on 7 December 2019, in a 2–1 win against Corinthian-Casuals. However, Brightlingsea Regent's poor form continued to see the club placed in the relegation zone. Despite expressing his optimism of Brightlingsea Regent's chances of avoiding relegation, the 2019–20 season ended early because of the COVID-19 pandemic.

However, Izzet left Brightlingsea Regent on 19 October 2020, seven games into the 2020–21 season.

== Personal life ==
Izzet's father is a Turkish Cypriot, who came to England as a small boy, and his mother is English. His elder brother, Muzzy Izzet, was a Turkish international footballer. According to Kemel, their father pushed both him and Muzzy into becoming footballers, due to his passion of the sport. After scoring a brace against Chesterfield on 18 October 2002, he dedicated his goals to his brother. Izzet also spoke about his brother, saying: " I'm just going to concentrate on my own game and approach it like any other match. I can't get caught up in the comparisons with my brother. I've just got to give my all for Colchester. I'm proud of what my brother has achieved and if I could do half of that I will be happy."

Izzet is good friends with teammate, Karl Duguid. He is married and together, they have three children. In October 2019, Izzet underwent a hip operation.

== Career statistics ==
As of 28 November 2013.

Appearances and goals by club, season and competition
Club	Season	League			FA Cup		League Cup		Other^{[A]}		Total	
Club	Season	Division	Apps	Goals	Apps	Goals	Apps	Goals	Apps	Goals	Apps	Goals
Charlton Athletic	1998–99	Premier League	0	0	0	0	0	0	0	0	0	0
Charlton Athletic	1999–2000	First Division	0	0	0	0	0	0	0	0	0	0
Charlton Athletic	2000–01	Premier League	0	0	0	0	0	0	0	0	0	0
Charlton Athletic	Total		0	0	0	0	0	0	0	0	0	0
Colchester United (loan)	2000–01	Second Division	2	0	0	0	0	0	0	0	2	0
Colchester United	2000–01	Second Division	4	1	0	0	0	0	0	0	4	1
Colchester United	2001–02	Second Division	40	3	1	0	2	1	2	1	45	5
Colchester United	2002–03	Second Division	45	8	1	0	1	0	1	0	48	8
Colchester United	2003–04	Second Division	44	3	6	0	2	0	4	1	56	4
Colchester United	2004–05	League One	4	0	0	0	0	0	0	0	4	0
Colchester United	2005–06	League One	33	0	3	0	1	0	4	0	41	0
Colchester United	2006–07	Championship	45	1	1	0	1	0	0	0	47	1
Colchester United	2007–08	Championship	39	1	0	0	1	0	0	0	40	1
Colchester United	2008–09	League One	43	1	1	0	2	0	2	0	48	1
Colchester United	2009–10	League One	37	0	2	0	1	0	1	0	41	0
Colchester United	2010–11	League One	41	0	3	0	2	0	1	0	47	0
Colchester United	2011–12	League One	34	0	2	0	1	0	1	0	38	0
Colchester United	2012–13	League One	11	0	0	0	1	0	0	0	12	0
Colchester United	Total	League One	420	18	20	0	15	1	16	2	471	21
Career total			422	18	20	0	15	1	16	2	473	21

A. The "Other" column constitutes appearances and goals (including those as a substitute) in the Football League Trophy, FA Trophy, .

== Honours ==
Colchester United

- Football League One second-place promotion: 2005–06

Needham Market

- Division One North champions: 2014–15
- Suffolk Premier Cup: 2016–17

Sporting positions
Preceded by Magnus Okuonghae	Colchester United Captain; 2010-2013	Succeeded by Brian Wilson
