= Alan White (English footballer) =

English footballer (born 1976)

Personal information
- Full name: Alan White
- Date of birth: 22 March 1976 (age 50)
- Place of birth: Darlington, England
- Height: 6 ft 1 in (1.85 m)
- Position: Centre back

Senior career*
Years	Team	Apps	(Gls)
1995–1997	Middlesbrough	0	(0)
1997–2000	Luton Town	79	(3)
1999	→ Colchester United (loan)	4	(0)
2000–2004	Colchester United	140	(4)
2004–2005	Leyton Orient	26	(0)
2005–2006	Boston United	48	(4)
2006–2007	Notts County	35	(5)
2007	→ Peterborough United (loan)	7	(3)
2007–2009	Darlington	75	(3)
2009–2010	Luton Town	16	(0)
2010	→ Darlington (loan)	24	(1)
2010	Stalybridge Celtic	6	(0)
2010–2011	Gateshead	3	(0)
2011	Blyth Spartans	15	(3)
2011	Boston United	13	(0)
2011–2013	Harrogate Town	48	(3)
2013–2016	Darlington 1883	78	(12)
2016–2017	Spennymoor Town		

Managerial career
- 2016–2017: Spennymoor Town (player-coach)
- 2017–2019: Darlington (assistant)
- * Club domestic league appearances and goals

Alan White (born 22 March 1976) is an English former professional footballer who made more than 400 appearances in the Football League.

== Career ==
Born in Darlington, County Durham, White began his career as a trainee at Middlesbrough in 1995, but his only first-team appearance came in the Anglo-Italian Cup. He joined Luton Town in September 1997 for a fee of £40,000, and made over 80 league appearances in three seasons. He had a one-month loan spell with Colchester United in late 1999, and joined that club on a free transfer in July 2000.

White made 166 appearances for Colchester in four seasons, scoring four goals, and was voted the club's player of the year in the 2003–04 season. He rejected their offer of a new contract and instead joined Leyton Orient in June 2004 on a two-year deal. However, he was allowed to leave nine months later and joined Boston United in March 2005 on a one-year contract; Boston manager Steve Evans said he was "delighted to get Alan on board. He was outstanding for Colchester United last season and is a great competitor."

At the end of his Boston contract in June 2006, White joined Notts County on a free transfer, where he was made club captain. Nine months later, he joined Peterborough United on loan for the remainder of the 2006–07 season, and was one of six players released by Notts County at the end of the season.

White joined his hometown club Darlington on 15 May 2007. He went on to make 85 league and cup appearances. Darlington entered administration in February 2009, and White was told he would be free to leave at the end of the season. He subsequently rejoined Luton Town on a two-year contract on 8 June 2009. He played 24 games for the club before being placed on the transfer list on 12 January 2010. Three days later he rejoined Darlington on loan for the rest of the season. He made 24 appearances as Darlington were relegated from the Football League, picking up just 30 points from 46 games.

On 27 August 2010, White was released by Luton. He was picked up by Conference North club Stalybridge Celtic and made his debut against Alfreton Town on 2 October 2010. White made 8 league and cup appearances for Stalybridge before signing for Gateshead on a monthly contract on 18 November. He made his debut on 20 November in a 1–1 draw with Forest Green Rovers, and scored his first goal for them on 14 December against Southport in the FA Trophy. On 8 February 2011, Gateshead announced that they had released White.

He signed for Blyth Spartans on 11 February and made his debut four days later against Alfreton Town, scoring an own goal in a 2–1 defeat. He made 15 appearances by the end of the season, and then rejoined Boston United, then playing in the Conference North, on a non-contract basis. In mid-December, he left the club, citing the distance he had to travel from his home in Darlington, and signed for another Conference North club, Harrogate Town. He helped them gain promotion to the Conference National in 2013, but left the club in October 2013 to rejoin Darlington – by then playing in the Northern Premier League Division One North under the name of Darlington 1883 – in search of regular football. He was named in the 2013–14 Northern Premier League Division One North Team of the Season, and contributed to two consecutive promotions in the next two seasons, as well as taking on some coaching duties.

In June 2016, White joined Spennymoor Town as player-coach. He remained with the club until October 2017, when he returned to Darlington as assistant to newly appointed manager Tommy Wright. When Wright left the club at the end of the 2018–19 season, White stayed on as temporary academy manager until a permanent appointment was made in mid-July.

== Career statistics ==
As of end of 2015–16 season

Appearances and goals by club, season and competition
Club	Season	League			National Cup		League Cup (Note: Appearances in Northern Premier League Challenge Cup for Darlington 1883, otherwise in Football League Cup)		Other		Total	
Club	Season	Division	Apps	Goals	Apps	Goals	Apps	Goals	Apps	Goals	Apps	Goals
Middlesbrough	1994–95	First Division	0	0	0	0	0	0	1 (Note: Appearance in Anglo-Italian Cup)	0	1	0
Middlesbrough	1995–96	Premier League	0	0	0	0	0	0	—		0	0
Middlesbrough	1996–97	Premier League	0	0	0	0	0	0	—		0	0
Middlesbrough	1997–98	Premier League	0	0	—		0	0	—		0	0
Middlesbrough	Total		0	0	0	0	0	0	1	0	1	0
Luton Town	1997–98	Second Division	28	1	1	0	—		3 (Note: Appearances in Football League Trophy)	0	32	1
Luton Town	1998–99	Second Division	32	1	1	0	3	0	1	0	37	1
Luton Town	1999–2000	Second Division	19	1	0	0	2	0	—		21	1
Luton Town	Total		79	3	2	0	5	0	4	0	90	3
Colchester United (loan)	1999–2000	Second Division	4	0	—		—		1	0	5	0
Colchester United	2000–01	Second Division	32	0	1	0	4	0	0	0	37	0
Colchester United	2001–02	Second Division	33	3	1	0	1	0	0	0	35	3
Colchester United	2002–03	Second Division	41	0	0	0	1	0	1	0	43	0
Colchester United	2003–04	Second Division	33	1	6	0	2	0	5	0	46	1
Colchester United	Total		143	4	8	0	8	0	7	0	166	4
Leyton Orient	2004–05	League Two	26	0	2	0	1	0	2	0	31	0
Boston United	2004–05	League Two	11	0	—		—		—		11	0
Boston United	2005–06	League Two	37	4	3	0	1	0	1	1	42	5
Boston United	Total		48	4	3	0	1	0	1	1	53	5
Notts County	2006–07	League Two	35	5	1	0	3	0	1	0	40	5
Peterborough United (loan)	2006–07	League Two	7	3	—		—		—		7	3
Darlington	2007–08	League Two	35	1	2	0	1	0	3 (Note: One appearance in Football League Trophy, two in League Two play-offs)	0	41	1
Darlington	2008–09	League Two	40	2	1	0	0	0	3	2	44	4
Darlington	Total		75	3	3	0	1	0	6	2	85	5
Luton Town	2009–10	Conference Premier	16	0	5	1	0	0	1 (Note: Appearance in FA Trophy)	0	22	1
Darlington (loan)	2009–10	League Two	24	1	—		—		—		24	1
Stalybridge Celtic	2010–11	Conference North	6	0	2	0	—		—		8	0
Gateshead	2010–11	Conference Premier	3	0	—		—		1	1	4	1
Blyth Spartans	2010–11	Conference North	15	3	—		—		—		15	3
Boston United	2011–12	Conference North	13	0	1	0	—		2	0	16	0
Harrogate Town	2011–12	Conference North	17	1	—		—		1 (Note: Appearance in West Riding County Cup)	0	18	1
Harrogate Town	2012–13	Conference North	30	2	7	0	—		2	0	39	2
Harrogate Town	2013–14	Conference North	1	0	0	0	—		—		1	0
Harrogate Town	Total		48	3	7	0	—		3	0	58	3
Darlington 1883	2013–14	Northern Premier League Div One North	29	3	—		2	1	3	1	34	5
Darlington 1883	2014–15	NPL Div One North	33	5	2	0	0	0	4 (Note: Two appearances and one goal in FA Trophy, two appearances in Northern Premier League play-offs)	1	39	6
Darlington 1883	2015–16	NPL Premier Div	16	4	1	0	2	0	1	0	20	4
Darlington 1883	Total		78	12	3	0	4	1	8	2	93	15
Career total			616	41	37	1	23	1	37	6	713	49
