= Richard Knight (footballer) =

English footballer

Personal information
- Full name: Richard Knight
- Date of birth: 3 August 1979 (age 47)
- Place of birth: Burton upon Trent, England
- Height: 6 ft 2 in (1.88 m)
- Position: Goalkeeper

Senior career*
Years	Team	Apps	(Gls)
1994–1997	Burton Albion	1	(0)
1997–2000	Derby County	0	(0)
1999	→ Carlisle United (loan)	6	(0)
1999	→ Birmingham City (loan)	0	(0)
1999	→ Hull City (loan)	1	(0)
1999–2000	→ Macclesfield Town (loan)	3	(0)
2000	→ Oxford United (loan)	2	(0)
2000	→ Oxford United (loan)	11	(0)
2000–2002	Oxford United	36	(0)
2002	→ Colchester United (loan)	1	(0)
2004	Didcot Town	16	(0)
2004–2009	Brackley Town		
2009–2010	Oxford City		
2014	Stamford		
2014	Cambridge City	4	(0)
2014–2015	Kettering Town	23	(0)
2015	Stamford		
- * Club domestic league appearances and goals

Richard Knight (born 3 August 1979) is an English footballer who played professionally in the Football League for Carlisle United, Hull City, Macclesfield Town, Oxford United and Colchester United. A goalkeeper, he went on to play for several years in non-league football.

== Playing career ==
Knight was born in Burton upon Trent, Staffordshire. He began his football career with Burton Albion, for whom he made one appearance, against Salisbury City in 1994. Ten minutes after coming on as a half-time substitute, he was sent off after bringing down an opponent. Outfield player Darren Stride went in goal and saved the resultant penalty, but Burton lost 2–0. He then joined Derby County in 1997. He spent time on loan at clubs including Carlisle United, for whom he made his Football League debut, on 27 March 1999 in Division Three in a 2–1 defeat at Cardiff City, Birmingham City, for whom he appeared only in one League Cup match, Hull City, and Macclesfield Town. After Derby recalled him from loan at Carlisle, they signed Jimmy Glass on loan to replace him; Glass went on to score the injury-time goal in the last match of the season that saved Carlisle from relegation out of the Football League.

He finished off his loan spells with two separate stints with Oxford United, where his impressive form played a significant part in the club avoiding relegation, and joined them on a permanent basis in 2000 without ever having appeared in a competitive match for Derby. He lost his place in December 2000 after Oxford were 2–0 up in the FA Cup at Conference club Chester City but lost 3–2, thus failing to qualify for the potentially lucrative third round, and only regained it in the following March. Nevertheless, at the end of the season, with the club bottom of Division Two, he won Oxford United's supporters' player of the year award. He lost his place again to the newly arrived Ian McCaldon, had a spell on loan at Colchester United, and was released at the end of the 2001–02 season.

In January 2004 he signed for Didcot Town as cover, and played in the final of the Hellenic League Cup as Didcot beat Bishops Cleeve 3–1. He moved on to Brackley Town in 2004, and remained at the club until he was released in the summer of 2009. He then joined Oxford City, but left the club in October 2010, due to commuting difficulties from his Derbyshire home.

In 2014, Knight turned out for Stamford and spent a few weeks with Cambridge City as goalkeeping cover before joining Kettering Town in November 2014. He played regularly for the remainder of the 2014–15 season as Kettering won the Southern Football League Division One Central title. After a single season with the Poppies, he rejoined Stamford, for whom he played 29 matches and won six man-of-the-match awards, before leaving the club in December 2015 due to work commitments.
