= Con Blatsis =

Australian soccer player

Personal information
- Full name: Constantinos Blatsis
- Date of birth: 6 July 1977 (age 49)
- Place of birth: Melbourne, Australia
- Height: 1.90 m (6 ft 3 in)
- Position: Defender

Youth career
- South Melbourne
- 1994–1995: AIS

Senior career*
Years	Team	Apps	(Gls)
1995–2000	South Melbourne	96	(4)
2000–2001	Derby County	2	(0)
2000–2001	→ Sheffield Wednesday (loan)	6	(0)
2001–2002	Colchester United	7	(0)
2002–2004	Kocaelispor	11	(1)
2004	St Patrick's Athletic	0	(0)
2005–2009	South Melbourne	26	(0)
Total		149	(5)

International career
1996–1997	Australia U-20	11	(3)
1998–2000	Australia U-23	12	(0)
2000–2001	Australia	2	(0)
Medal record
Representing Australia
Men's Association football
OFC U-20 Championship
Winner	1997 Tahiti
- * Club domestic league appearances and goals as of 18 June 2014

Constantinos "Con" Blatsis (born 6 July 1977) is a former Australian international association footballer who played as a defender.

== Club career ==
Blatsis was born in Melbourne. He started his career at his home club South Melbourne making 104 league appearances before moving to English Premier League side Derby County in the summer of 2000. He was regarded to have failed to establish himself while playing for the club. He subsequently joined First Division Sheffield Wednesday on loan making six appearances. After making only two appearances for Derby he was released and in March 2002 joined Division Two side Colchester United on a short-term deal. He made seven appearances for the club becoming a fan favorite in the process. However, he left the club at the end of the season. He then joined Turkish team Kocaelispor, where he played until he left the club for financial reasons during his second season. A brief move to Irish club St Patrick's Athletic followed, but after only two cup appearances he left in May 2004. After unsuccessful trials with Coventry City and FC Twente, he returned to his first club, South Melbourne in early 2005. He stayed at the club until he retired in 2009 after a series of injuries.

== International career ==
He played for the Australian Under-20 and Under-23 sides before earning two senior caps and a place in the squad for the 2000 Summer Olympics. He suffered an injury while playing in the competition.

== Personal life ==
Blatsis was born on 6 July 1977 in Melbourne, Australia. He has been married.

== Career statistics ==
=== Club ===
Appearances and goals by club, season and competition
Club	Season	League			Cup		Continental		Total	
Club	Season	Division	Apps	Goals	Apps	Goals	Apps	Goals	Apps	Goals
South Melbourne	1995–96	National Soccer League	19	1	8	0	0	0	27	1
South Melbourne	1996–97	National Soccer League	23	1	2	0	0	0	25	1
South Melbourne	1997–98	National Soccer League	23	1	0	0	0	0	23	1
South Melbourne	1998–99	National Soccer League	7	0	0	0	0	0	7	0
South Melbourne	1999–2000	National Soccer League	24	1	0	0	4	0	28	1
South Melbourne	South Melbourne total		96	4	10	0	4	0	110	4
Derby County	2000–01	Premier League	2	0	0	0	0	0	2	0
Sheffield Wednesday (loan)	2000–01	First Division	6	0	2	0	0	0	8	0
Colchester United	2001–02	Second Division	7	0	0	0	0	0	7	0
Kocaelispor	2002–03	Süper Lig	9	1	2	0	0	0	11	1
Kocaelispor	2003–04	TFF First League	2	0	1	0	0	0	3	0
Kocaelispor	Kocaelispor total		11	1	3	0	0	0	14	1
St Patrick's Athletic	2004	League of Ireland	0	0	2	0	0	0	2	0
South Melbourne	2005	Victorian Premier League	15	0	0	0	0	0	15	0
South Melbourne	2006	Victorian Premier League	11	0	0	0	0	0	11	0
South Melbourne	2007	Victorian Premier League	0	0	0	0	0	0	0	0
South Melbourne	2008	Victorian Premier League	0	0	0	0	0	0	0	0
South Melbourne	2009	Victorian Premier League	0	0	0	0	0	0	0	0
South Melbourne	South Melbourne total		26	0	0	0	0	0	26	0
Career total			149	5	17	0	4	0	170	5

=== International ===
Australia national team
Year	Apps	Goals
2000	1	0
2001	1	0
Total	2	0

== Honours ==
=== Player ===
South Melbourne

- Oceania Club Championship: 1999
- National Soccer League Championship: 1997–98, 1998–99
- National Soccer League Premiership: 1997–98
- NSL Cup: 1995–96
- Victorian Premier League: 2006

Australia U-20

- OFC U-19 Men's Championship: 1997
