= Richard McKinney (footballer) =

Northern Irish footballer

Personal information
- Date of birth: 18 May 1979 (age 47)
- Place of birth: Ballymoney, Northern Ireland
- Position: Goalkeeper

Team information
- Current team: Great Wakering Rovers

Senior career*
Years	Team	Apps	(Gls)
1998–1999	Ballymena United	27	(0)
1999–2001	Manchester City	0	(0)
2001–2002	Swindon Town	1	(0)
2002–2004	Colchester United	29	(0)
2004–2005	Walsall	3	(0)
2005–2006	Canvey Island	19	(0)
2006–2007	Chelmsford City	28	(0)
2007–2008	Heybridge Swifts	11	(0)
2008	Wivenhoe Town	15	
2008–2010	Great Wakering Rovers	24	

International career
- Northern Ireland U18
- Northern Ireland U21
- * Club domestic league appearances and goals

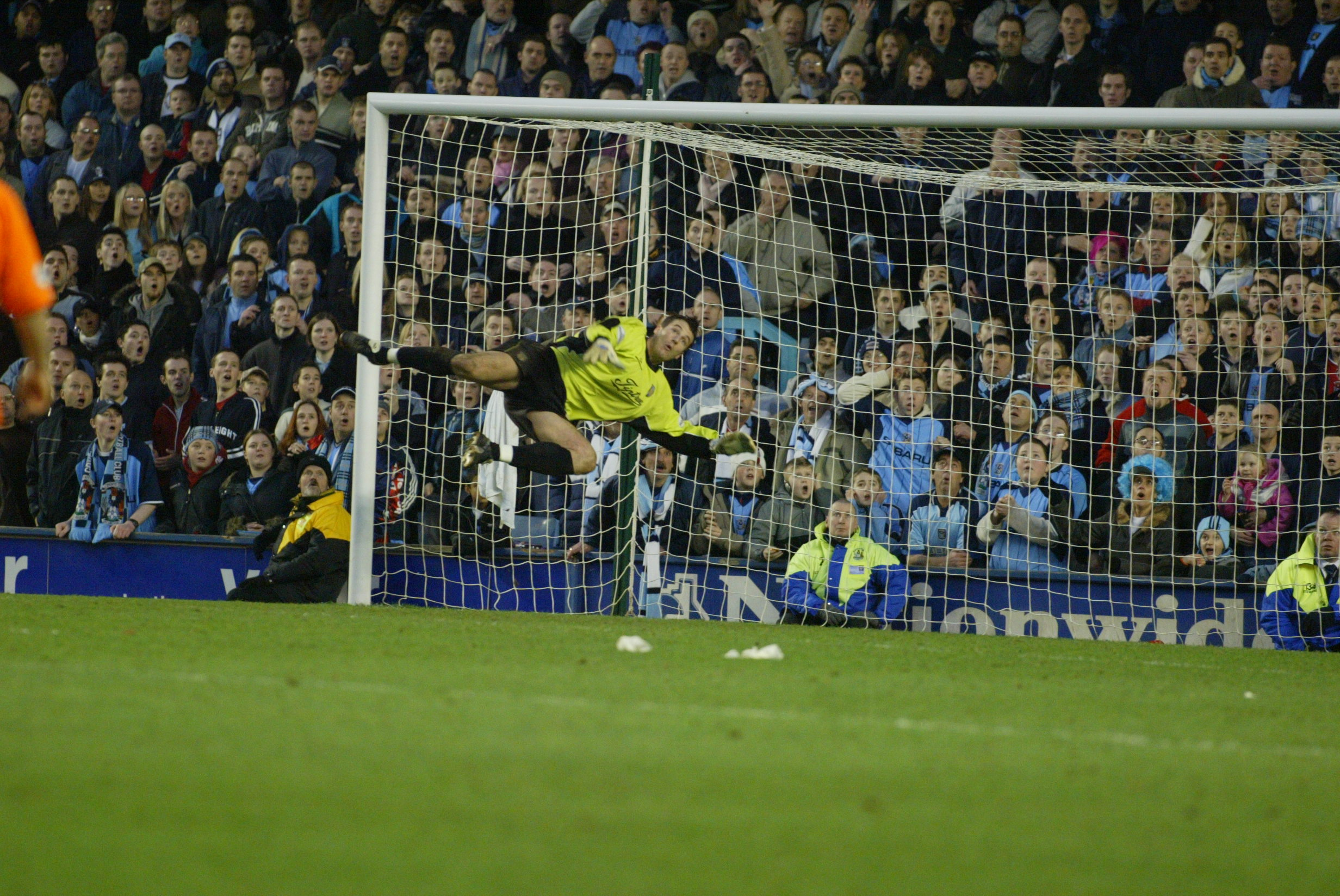
FA Cup 4th round vs Coventry City

Richard McKinney (born 18 May 1979) is a goalkeeper who last played for Great Wakering Rovers in the Isthmian League First Division North.

He has formerly played for Ballymena United, Manchester City, Swindon Town, Colchester United, Walsall, Canvey Island, Chelmsford City and Heybridge Swifts, and represented Northern Ireland at Under-18 and Under-21 levels.
