= Danny Steele =

English footballer from London

Personal information
- Date of birth: 11 October 1982 (age 44)
- Place of birth: Southwark, London, England
- Position: Defender

Youth career
- Millwall

Senior career*
Years	Team	Apps	(Gls)
2002	Millwall	0	(0)
2002	Colchester United	8	(0)
2003–?	Fisher Athletic	?	(?)
- * Club domestic league appearances and goals as of 11:00, 25 February 2012 (UTC)

Danny Steele (born 10 October 1982) is an English footballer who played in The Football League as a defender.

== Career ==
Steele began his career at Millwall, where he was handed a three-month pro contract having shown excellent form for the under-19 team. At the end of the 2001–02 season, Steele was released along with six other players. Steele played for the Colchester United reserves in their final game against Gillingham at the end of the 2001–02 season, and took part in a further game organised by manager Steve Whitton to take a further look at him. He signed for Colchester on a non-contract basis after impressing while on trial at the club, having played in all the U's pre-season friendlies and making a solid impression on Whitton. After making eight league appearances for Colchester, the former Millwall player had failed to hold down a regular first team place and had his contract cancelled by mutual consent. He had only made one substitute appearance for the U's since he had been sent off after 15 minutes in a draw with Barnsley in October 2002. Steele then joined non-league Fisher Athletic in 2003.
