= Lloyd Opara =

English footballer

Personal information
- Full name: Junior Lloyd Opara
- Date of birth: 6 January 1984 (age 42)
- Place of birth: Enfield, England
- Height: 6 ft 1 in (1.85 m)
- Position: Striker

Youth career
- ?–2001: Colchester United

Senior career*
Years	Team	Apps	(Gls)
2001–2002	Colchester United	6	(0)
2002–2003	Cambridge United	10	(1)
2003	Stevenage Borough	1	(0)
2003	→ Enfield (loan)	4	(2)
2003	Braintree Town	1	(0)
2003	Hornchurch	5	(1)
2003–2004	Grays Athletic	11	(3)
2004	Swindon Town	0	(0)
2004	St Albans City	2	(0)
2004	Bishop's Stortford	1	(1)
2005	Redbridge	15	(5)
2005	→ Chelmsford City (loan)	1	(0)
2005–2006	Cheshunt	25	(18)
2006	→ Peterborough United (loan)	8	(1)
2006–2007	Peterborough United	11	(1)
2007	→ Burton Albion (loan)	1	(0)
2007	Cheshunt	10	(6)
2007	Windsor & Eton	1	(0)
2007	Harlow Town	1	(0)
2007	Potters Bar Town	0	(0)
2007	Waltham Forest	2	(0)
2007–2008	Arlesey Town	2	(1)
2008	Cheshunt	3	(0)
2008	Broxbourne Borough V. & E.	6	(2)
2008	Haringey Borough	39	(16)
2012	Haringey Borough	7	(1)
Total		173	(59)
- * Club domestic league appearances and goals

Junior Lloyd Opara (born 6 January 1984) is an English former footballer who played as a striker. He played for many clubs during his career. While Opara was at Peterborough he starred in a 'Sky One' documentary Big Ron Manager which was aired in 2006.

His older brother Kelechi was also a professional footballer.

== Career ==
He began his career at Colchester United in 2001 and made his senior debut on 13 October 2001 against Blackpool. After being released by Colchester in 2002 he joined Cambridge United, who were interested in taking on the final year of his scholarship. He instead joined Stevenage Borough in January 2003. He has also played for Enfield, Braintree Town, Hornchurch, Cheshunt, and Swindon Town and many others. He left Swindon by mutual consent in September 2004 after failing to adapt to life outside London. After a trial at Chelsea, Opara was unhappy with life at Swindon, the 22-year-old was also a transfer target for League Two side Peterborough after training at London Road. "Chelsea want him to go there for a trial period, so we can't stand in his way," Posh manager Steve Bleasdale told his club's website. Opara, who has had previous spells with Colchester, Cambridge and Swindon, has scored 23 goals this season for Southern League side Cheshunt.

He signed for Peterborough United on loan in March 2006, and while Opara was at Peterborough he starred in a Sky One documentary 'Big Ron Manager'. In January 2007 he joined Burton Albion on a month's loan, after which time he returned to Peterborough, who cancelled his contract the following month by mutual consent. He joined, then rejoined Arlesey Town, after another brief spell at Cheshunt where he came on as a sub and picked up a winners medal in the final of the 2008 Herts Charity Cup. In 2008–09 season he appeared for Broxbourne Borough in the Premier Division of the Spartan South Midlands League.

== After football ==
After retiring from football Opara became a teacher. In 2018 he was a deputy headteacher at the John Port School in Derbyshire but he has left the role.
