= Kevin Rapley =

English footballer

Personal information
- Full name: Kevin John Rapley
- Date of birth: 21 September 1977 (age 49)
- Place of birth: Reading, England
- Position: Forward

Senior career*
Years	Team	Apps	(Gls)
1995–1999	Brentford	33	(5)
1998–1999	→ Southend United (loan)	9	(4)
1999	→ Notts County (loan)	7	(1)
1999–2001	Notts County	49	(4)
2000	→ Exeter City (loan)	7	(0)
2001	→ Scunthorpe United (loan)	5	(0)
2001–2003	Colchester United	56	(11)
2003–2005	Chester City	46	(3)
2005	→ Forest Green Rovers (loan)	5	(0)
2005–2006	Droylsden		
2006–2007	Leigh RMI	32	(12)
2007–2008	Barrow		
2008	→ Vauxhall Motors (loan)		
2008–????	Witton Albion		
- * Club domestic league appearances and goals

Kevin Rapley (born 21 September 1977) is an English former footballer.

== Career ==
The striker began his career with Brentford as an apprentice, going on to make 51 Football League appearances for them. He later played in the league for Southend United (loan), Notts County, Exeter City (loan), Scunthorpe United and Colchester United, before joining Football Conference side Chester City in July 2003. His first season at the club ended with Chester winning the title and promotion back to the League, where he played for one more season (but part of it was spent on loan at Forest Green Rovers). Unfortunately, he struggled to land a regular place in the Chester side throughout his time at the club and had a relatively poor scoring record, meaning it came as no surprise when he was released by the club in 2005.

Rapley's 2005–06 season started well but petered out through the season, which ended with Droylsden losing to Stafford Rangers in the Conference North play-off final on penalties. In February 2007, he signed for Leigh RMI, where he helped them avoid relegation from the Conference North at the end of 2006–07.

In October 2007, after 12 goals from 32 appearances at Leigh, Rapley moved to Barrow, who were also struggling in the Conference North. The fans at Barrow reacted positively to the move, believing Rapley's wealth of experience would lift them up the table and he enhanced his reputation by scoring in a 1–1 draw with Football League One side AFC Bournemouth in the FA Cup First Round in November 2007.

On 3 January 2008, Rapley joined Vauxhall Motors on loan to gain match practice. The following month he joined Witton Albion on a permanent basis.

== Honours ==
Brentford

- Football League Third Division: 1998–99

Chester City

- Football Conference: 2003–04
