= Bobby Bowry =

English–Saint Kitts and Nevis footballer

Personal information
- Full name: Robert John Bowry
- Date of birth: 19 May 1971 (age 55)
- Place of birth: Croydon, England
- Height: 1.80 m (5 ft 11 in)
- Position: Midfielder

Youth career
- Islington St Mary's
- 1989–1990: Carshalton Athletic

Senior career*
Years	Team	Apps	(Gls)
1990–1992	Queens Park Rangers	0	(0)
1992–1995	Crystal Palace	50	(1)
1995–2001	Millwall	140	(5)
2001–2005	Colchester United	106	(2)
2005–2006	Gravesend & Northfleet	35	(1)
2006–2008	Bromley	53	(0)
Total		384	(9)

International career
2000	Saint Kitts and Nevis	2	(0)
- * Club domestic league appearances and goals

Robert John Bowry (born 19 May 1971) is a former professional footballer who played as a midfielder from 1990 until 2008.

He played in the Premier League with Crystal Palace, and in the Football League with Queens Park Rangers, Millwall and Colchester United. He finished his career in non-league football with Gravesend & Northfleet and Bromley. Born in England, he represented the Saint Kitts and Nevis national team. Upon retiring he worked as a coach and is now a football agent.

== Playing career ==
Bowry began his career at Queens Park Rangers, but he failed to make a first-team league appearance. He moved to Crystal Palace in April 1992 on a free transfer. Helping the team win a First Division title in 1993–94, he had made 50 league appearances and scored one goal at Palace before being sold to Millwall in July 1995 for £220,000. Bowry spent six years at Millwall, making 140 league appearances, scoring 5 goals, and also appeared twice in 2000 for Saint Kitts and Nevis national football team. He was released from Millwall in 2001, and signed for Colchester United, where he made 106 league appearances and scored 2 goals. In May 2005, Bowry was released by Colchester. He was signed by Gravesend & Northfleet in July 2005 on a one-year contract. After one season at Gravesend, he joined Bromley in a player-coach role. After two seasons at Bromley, Bowry quit when the club was put up for sale and retired.

== Football agent ==
He is now believed to be a football agent with a number of Premier League and Football League players on his books.

== Personal life ==
Bowry's father was born in Saint Kitts and Nevis while his mother was born in Antigua, Antigua and Barbuda. His son, Daniel Bowry, is also a professional footballer who plays for the Antigua and Barbuda national football team. Bowry's daughter, Lauren, is a singer and dancer who competed on the BBC talent show Little Mix The Search in 2020, as part of the girl group Melladaze which was formed on the show.

== Honours ==
Crystal Palace

- Football League First Division: 1993–94
