= Joe Keith =

English footballer (born 1978)

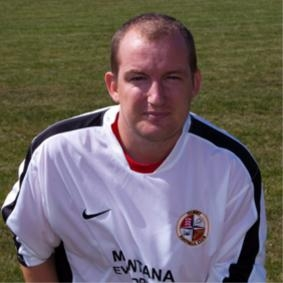
- Keith with Tilbury in 2008

Personal information
- Full name: Joseph Richard Keith
- Date of birth: 1 October 1978 (age 48)
- Place of birth: London, England
- Height: 5 ft 7 in (1.70 m)
- Position: Midfielder

Youth career
- -1997: West Ham United

Senior career*
Years	Team	Apps	(Gls)
1997–1999	West Ham United	0	(0)
1998–1999	→ Waterford United (loan)	4	(0)
1999–2005	Colchester United	208	(23)
2005	→ Bristol City (loan)	3	(0)
2005–2007	Leyton Orient	53	(2)
2006	Shrewsbury Town (loan)	1	(0)
2007	Brentford	18	(2)
2007–2008	AFC Hornchurch	4	(0)
2008–2009	Tilbury	42	(11)

Managerial career
- 2017–2018: Tilbury
- 2018–2026: Hashtag United (Assistant)
- * Club domestic league appearances and goals

Joe Keith (born 1 October 1978) is an English former footballer who played in the Football League for Colchester United, Bristol City, Leyton Orient, Shrewsbury Town and Brentford.

== Career ==
Keith started his career at West Ham United as a trainee but did not make a senior appearance. He joined Colchester United in 1999 and went on to score 28 goals in 247 league and cup appearances for the club in six seasons. After a brief loan spell with Bristol City at the end of the 2004–05 season, Keith was released by Colchester and joined Leyton Orient in June 2005. He made over fifty appearances in his eighteen months at Orient. He joined Shrewsbury on loan in October 2006, returning to Orient the following month.

Keith signed for Brentford in January 2007 on a five-month contract, linking up with former Colchester teammate and then Brentford manager Scott Fitzgerald. He played 18 games for Brentford, scoring twice, before being released in May 2007. After being released by Brentford, he dropped into non-league football, joining AFC Hornchurch.

In August 2008 Keith went on to play for Tilbury of the Isthmian League First Division North where he spent a successful 2008–09, season playing 42 league games and scoring 11 goals. Keith was instrumental in helping the Dockers win their first silverware since 1975 when they won the Isthmian League Cup, beating Harrow Borough 2–0 in April 2009.

=== Coaching career ===
In the 2009–10 season Keith took a player/coach role at Tilbury where he was joined by former teammate Lee Hodges.

After a spell as a coach with East Thurrock United he joined local rivals Canvey Island as assistant manager in February 2016. He was appointed manager of Tilbury in October 2017. He left the club in November 2018. In October 2019, Keith took up a coaching role at Hashtag United.

== Honours ==
=== Club ===
West Ham United

- FA Youth Cup Runner-up (1): 1995–96

Tilbury

- Isthmian League Cup: 2008–2009
