= Triston Chambers =

English footballer (born 1982)

Personal information
- Full name: Triston Gregory Chambers
- Date of birth: 25 December 1982 (age 43)
- Place of birth: Enfield, London, England
- Height: 5 ft 8 in (1.73 m)
- Position: Forward

Youth career
- –2001: Colchester United

Senior career*
Years	Team	Apps	(Gls)
2001–2002	Colchester United	1	(0)
2002	→ Harlow Town (loan)		
- Dagenham & Redbridge
- Heybridge Swifts
Total		1	(0)
- * Club domestic league appearances and goals

Triston Gregory Chambers (born 25 December 1982) is an English footballer who played in the Football League as a forward for Colchester United.

== Career ==
Born in Enfield, London, Chambers came through the youth ranks at Colchester United, signing a short-term professional contract with the club in the summer of 2001. He made his debut for Colchester coming on as a 70th-minute substitute for Mick Stockwell in a 1–0 defeat to Cardiff City on 6 April 2002. This was to be his only appearance for the club and his only appearance in the Football League.

In September 2002, Chambers joined Harlow Town on a month-long loan deal in an attempt to gain first-team experience after failing to break into the Colchester starting eleven. He made his debut in a 2–0 win over Thame United.

Chambers was released from his contract with Colchester in October 2002 following a breach of club rules, linking up with Dagenham & Redbridge on trial as he searched for a new club. He joined the Daggers permanently following his trial, and later made appearances for Heybridge Swifts.
