= Joe Ross (referee) =

English football referee (born 1959)

Joseph Ross (born 28 December 1959) is an English former football referee, previously in the Football League, and also in the Premier League and Europe as an assistant referee. During his time as an official he resided in Chingford, Greater London.

== Career ==
Prior to his appointment to the National List of assistant referees in 1992, Ross had been refereeing in the Isthmian League. In 2000, he was a referees' assistant in the UEFA Cup. Before the 2001–02 season, Ross progressed to the Football League list of referees.

However, in his first season on this list, he was involved in a dispute with former Liverpool player, and then Oxford United manager, Mark Wright. Wright was later found guilty of racial and abusive language towards Ross, and resigned from the job at Oxford United on 12 December 2001.

Ross remained as a Football League referee for four seasons, but at the start of the 2005–06 season he reverted to the list of assistant referees, refereeing only one match, Yeading against St Albans, which was in the Football Conference South competition.

He subsequently retired from refereeing, confirmed when the lists of referees and assistants for season 2007–08 were published without his inclusion.
