= Adrian Coote =

Footballer (born 1978)

Personal information
- Date of birth: 30 September 1978 (age 48)
- Place of birth: Belton, England
- Position: Striker

Youth career
- Norwich City

Senior career*
Years	Team	Apps	(Gls)
1996–2001	Norwich City	54	(3)
2000	→ Roda JC Kerkrade (loan)	0	(0)
2001–2003	Colchester United	35	(4)
2002	→ Bristol Rovers (loan)	5	(1)
2003–2004	Wivenhoe Town	31	(12)
2004–2005	Dereham Town	24	(11)
2005–2007	Wroxham	29	(17)
2006	→ Acle Rangers (loan)		
2007	Dereham Town	2	(1)
2007–2008	Gorleston		(0)
2009-2009	Carpathians	6	(6)

International career
1998–1999	Northern Ireland U21	12	(4)
1999–2001	Northern Ireland	6	(0)
- * Club domestic league appearances and goals

Adrian Coote (born 30 September 1978) is a former professional footballer who played as a striker. Born in England, he made six appearances for the Northern Ireland national team.

== Career ==
Born in Belton, near Great Yarmouth, Coote came through the youth system at Norwich City, for whom he scored 3 goals in 61 appearances. While at Carrow Road, he won six full international caps with Northern Ireland.

Norwich sold Coote to Colchester United for £50,000, but was unable to establish himself in the side, and, after a loan spell at Bristol Rovers where he scored once against Leyton Orient, he was released by Colchester shortly after the start of the 2003–04 season.

After leaving Layer Road, Coote played for a series of non-league clubs in Norfolk including Wroxham And now currently plays for Shrublands fc veterans

Coote, who is now a sales manager for Brighthouse, said: "I did have some injury problems. I just fell out of love with football and am now moving on with my life - which is a good life."

== Sources ==
- Mark Davage; John Eastwood; Kevin Platt (2001). Canary Citizens. Jarrold Publishing. ISBN 0-7117-2020-7.
