= Marc Canham (footballer) =

British footballer (born 1982)

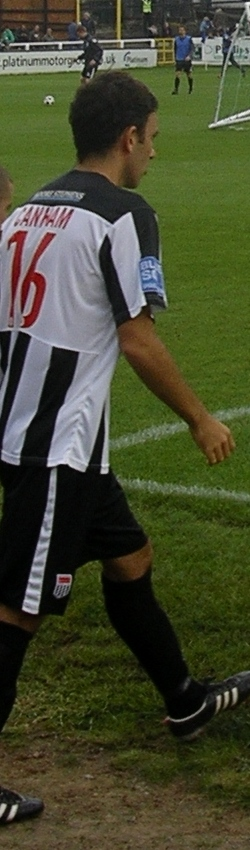

Personal information
- Full name: Marc David Canham
- Date of birth: 11 September 1982 (age 44)
- Height: 5 ft 11 in (1.80 m)
- Position: Midfielder

Senior career*
Years	Team	Apps	(Gls)
2002–2003	Colchester United	4	(0)
2003–2004	Bournemouth	0	(0)
2004–2009	Team Bath	?	(?)
2009–2010	Hayes & Yeading United	34	(0)
2010–2013	Bath City	83	(10)
- * Club domestic league appearances and goals as of 11:14, 13 May 2012 (UTC)

Marc David Canham (born 11 September 1982) is a former footballer who played as a midfielder.

== Career ==
Canham made his first team debut for Colchester United in a 1–0 defeat to Cardiff City on 6 April 2002. He joined Bournemouth on non-contract terms in 2003. After spending five seasons with Team Bath, he joined Hayes & Yeading United in July 2009. The club announced that he would be released when his contract expired on 30 June and he agreed to sign for Bath City on 1 July 2010.

In June 2022 Canham was appointed as chief football officer for the Football Association of Ireland. In April 2025 Canham stepped away from the role after almost 3 years in the position.
