= 1975–76 Leicester City F.C. season =

1975–76 season of Leicester City

Leicester City
1975–76 season
- Chairman: Walter Needham
- Manager: Jimmy Bloomfield
- First Division: 7th
- FA Cup: Fifth round
- League Cup: Fourth round
- Top goalscorer: League: Lee (11); All: Lee (15)
- Average home league attendance: 22,049
Home colours

During the 1975–76 English football season, Leicester City F.C. competed in the Football League First Division.

== Season summary ==
The 1975–76 season started very poorly for the Foxes as they went on a 15-game winless run that saw them languishing in the relegation places but after a 3–2 home win over Burnley in November which ended that run, matters picked up healthily which saw Leicester finish in a satisfying and comfortable 7th place.

== Final league table ==
| Pos | Team | Pld | W | D | L | GF | GA | GAv | Pts | Qualification or relegation |
|---|---|---|---|---|---|---|---|---|---|---|
| 5 | Leeds United | 42 | 21 | 9 | 12 | 65 | 46 | 1.413 | 51 | |
| 6 | Ipswich Town | 42 | 16 | 14 | 12 | 54 | 48 | 1.125 | 46 | |
| 7 | Leicester City | 42 | 13 | 19 | 10 | 48 | 51 | 0.941 | 45 | |
| 8 | Manchester City | 42 | 16 | 11 | 15 | 64 | 46 | 1.391 | 43 | Qualification for the UEFA Cup first round |
| 9 | Tottenham Hotspur | 42 | 14 | 15 | 13 | 63 | 63 | 1.000 | 43 | |

Source: World Football
Rules for classification: 1) Points; 2) Goal average; 3) Goals scored

== Results ==
Leicester City's score comes first

=== Legend ===
| Win | Draw | Loss |

=== Football League First Division ===
| Date | Opponent | Venue | Result | Attendance | Scorers |
|---|---|---|---|---|---|
| 16 August 1975 | Birmingham City | H | 3–3 | 25,547 | Sammels (pen), Alderson, Roberts (own goal) |
| 20 August 1975 | Manchester City | A | 1–1 | 28,557 | Lee |
| 23 August 1975 | Newcastle United | A | 0–3 | 36,084 | |
| 27 August 1975 | Stoke City | H | 1–1 | 22,878 | Garland |
| 30 August 1975 | Liverpool | H | 1–1 | 25,008 | Weller |
| 6 September 1975 | Arsenal | A | 1–1 | 22,005 | Sammels |
| 13 September 1975 | West Ham United | H | 3–3 | 21,413 | Worthington, Sammels (2) |
| 20 September 1975 | Norwich City | A | 0–2 | 22,266 | |
| 23 September 1975 | Queens Park Rangers | A | 0–1 | 19,292 | |
| 27 September 1975 | Coventry City | H | 0–3 | 20,411 | |
| 4 October 1975 | Manchester United | A | 0–0 | 47,878 | |
| 11 October 1975 | Middlesbrough | H | 0–0 | 19,095 | |
| 18 October 1975 | Ipswich Town | A | 1–1 | 23,418 | Lee |
| 25 October 1975 | Tottenham Hotspur | H | 2–3 | 22,088 | Weller (2) |
| 1 November 1975 | Everton | A | 1–1 | 24,930 | Lee |
| 8 November 1975 | Burnley | H | 3–2 | 18,344 | Weller, Kember, Garland |
| 15 November 1975 | Sheffield United | A | 2–1 | 20,165 | Alderson, Rofe |
| 22 November 1975 | Ipswich Town | H | 0–0 | 20,115 | |
| 29 November 1975 | Aston Villa | A | 1–1 | 36,388 | Worthington |
| 6 December 1975 | Wolverhampton Wanderers | H | 2–0 | 20,012 | Weller, Worthington |
| 13 December 1975 | Newcastle United | H | 1–0 | 18,130 | Weller |
| 20 December 1975 | Birmingham City | A | 1–2 | 21,890 | Lee |
| 26 December 1975 | Derby County | H | 2–1 | 17,311 | Lee (2) |
| 27 December 1975 | Leeds United | A | 0–4 | 45,139 | |
| 10 January 1976 | West Ham United | A | 1–1 | 24,615 | Lee |
| 17 January 1976 | Arsenal | H | 2–1 | 21,331 | Alderson, Lee |
| 31 January 1976 | Manchester City | H | 1–0 | 21,723 | Lee |
| 7 February 1976 | Stoke City | A | 2–1 | 21,001 | Worthington, Lee |
| 17 February 1976 | Burnley | A | 0–1 | 13,542 | |
| 21 February 1976 | Sheffield United | H | 1–1 | 18,698 | Blockley |
| 25 February 1976 | Queens Park Rangers | H | 0–1 | 24,340 | |
| 28 February 1976 | Tottenham Hotspur | A | 1–1 | 21,427 | Kember |
| 6 March 1976 | Everton | H | 1–0 | 18,490 | Worthington |
| 13 March 1976 | Middlesbrough | A | 1–0 | 17,634 | Boam (own goal) |
| 20 March 1976 | Aston Villa | H | 2–2 | 24,663 | Nicholl (2 own goals) |
| 27 March 1976 | Wolverhampton Wanderers | A | 2–2 | 18,113 | Sammels (pen), Worthington |
| 3 April 1976 | Coventry City | A | 2–0 | 18,135 | Weller, Lee |
| 6 April 1976 | Liverpool | A | 0–1 | 36,290 | |
| 10 April 1976 | Norwich City | H | 0–0 | 19,856 | |
| 17 April 1976 | Derby County | A | 2–2 | 30,085 | Alderson, Garland |
| 20 April 1976 | Leeds United | H | 2–1 | 24,240 | Worthington (2) |
| 24 April 1976 | Manchester United | H | 2–1 | 31,053 | Lee, Garland |

=== FA Cup ===
| Round | Date | Opponent | Venue | Result | Attendance | Goalscorers |
|---|---|---|---|---|---|---|
| R3 | 3 January 1976 | Sheffield United | H | 3–0 | 24,052 | Garland (3) |
| R4 | 24 January 1976 | Bury | H | 1–0 | 27,331 | Lee |
| R5 | 14 February 1976 | Manchester United | H | 1–2 | 34,000 | Lee |

=== League Cup ===
| Round | Date | Opponent | Venue | Result | Attendance | Goalscorers |
|---|---|---|---|---|---|---|
| R2 | 9 September 1975 | Portsmouth | A | 1–1 | 10,629 | Garland |
| R2R | 17 September 1975 | Portsmouth | H | 1–0 (a.e.t.) | 11,055 | Sammels |
| R3 | 8 October 1975 | Lincoln City | H | 2–1 | 17,060 | Weller, Sammels (pen) |
| R4 | 11 November 1975 | Burnley | A | 0–2 | 15,113 | |

=== Anglo-Scottish Cup ===
| Round | Date | Opponent | Venue | Result | Attendance | Goalscorers |
|---|---|---|---|---|---|---|
| Group 2 | 2 August 1975 | Hull City | A | 1–1 | 3,524 | Sammels |
| Group 2 | 6 August 1975 | Mansfield Town | A | 0–2 | 6,496 | |
| Group 2 | 9 August 1975 | West Bromwich Albion | H | 2–1 | 8,219 | Lee (2) |

== Squad ==
Note: Flags indicate national team as defined under FIFA eligibility rules; some limited exceptions apply. Players may hold more than one non-FIFA nationality.

| Pos. | Nation | Player |
|---|---|---|
| GK | ENG | Mark Wallington |
| DF | ENG | Steve Whitworth |
| DF | ENG | Dennis Rofe |
| MF | ENG | Jon Sammels |
| DF | ENG | Jeff Blockley |
| MF | ENG | Alan Birchenall |
| MF | ENG | Steve Kember |
| MF | SCO | Brian Alderson |
| FW | ENG | Bob Lee |
| FW | ENG | Chris Garland |
| MF | ENG | David Tomlin |

| Pos. | Nation | Player |
|---|---|---|
| FW | ENG | Steve Earle |
| DF | ENG | Steve Sims |
| DF | ENG | Graham Cross |
| MF | ENG | Keith Weller |
| FW | ENG | Frank Worthington |
| DF | ENG | Alan Woollett |
| DF | ENG | Steve Yates |
| MF | ENG | Len Glover |
| GK | ENG | Gary Plumley |
| GK | ENG | Carl Jayes |
