= 1973–74 Leicester City F.C. season =

1973–74 season of Leicester City

Leicester City
1973–74 season
- Chairman: Tom Bloor
- Manager: Jimmy Bloomfield
- First Division: 9th
- FA Cup: Semi-finals
- League Cup: Second round
- Texaco Cup: Second round
- Top goalscorer: League: Worthington (20); All: Worthington (25)
- Average home league attendance: 24,825
Home colours

During the 1973–74 English football season, Leicester City F.C. competed in the Football League First Division.

== Season summary ==
The 1973–74 season was a solid one for Leicester, starting the league well going eight matches unbeaten. There was also some entrancing entertainment served up but too many draws prevented the Foxes from challenging for a UEFA Cup place and had to settle for a creditable 9th place finish. Their main highlight was the FA Cup by reaching their sixth semi-final in their history, to set up an ensuing tie with favourites Liverpool. They held the Reds to a 0-0 draw at Old Trafford with a solid defensive display to set up an interesting replay at Villa Park but despite equalising through Len Glover after being 1-0 down, it ended in disappointment as the Foxes suffered a 3-1 defeat.

== Final league table ==
Pos	Team	Pld	W	D	L	GF	GA	GAv	Pts
7	Everton	42	16	12	14	50	48	1.042	44
8	Queens Park Rangers	42	13	17	12	56	52	1.077	43
9	Leicester City	42	13	16	13	51	41	1.244	42
10	Arsenal	42	14	14	14	49	51	0.961	42
11	Tottenham Hotspur	42	14	14	14	45	50	0.900	42

Source: World Football
Rules for classification: 1) Points; 2) Goal average; 3) Goals scored

== Results ==
Leicester City's score comes first

=== Legend ===
Win	Draw	Loss

=== Football League First Division ===
Date	Opponent	Venue	Result	Attendance	Scorers
25 August 1973	Ipswich Town	A	1–1	20,116	Sammels
28 August 1973	Chelsea	A	1–1	33,139	Weller
1 September 1973	Liverpool	H	1–1	29,347	Birchenall
5 September 1973	Manchester United	H	1–0	29,152	Worthington
8 September 1973	Arsenal	A	2–0	28,558	Glover, Stringfellow
12 September 1973	Manchester United	A	2–1	40,793	Weller, Stringfellow
15 September 1973	Manchester City	H	1–1	28,466	Weller
22 September 1973	West Ham United	A	1–1	23,567	Worthington
29 September 1973	Coventry City	H	0–2	29,319	
6 October 1973	Sheffield United	A	1–1	21,589	Weller
13 October 1973	Leeds United	H	2–2	36,978	Worthington, Birchenall
20 October 1973	Derby County	A	1–2	32,203	Worthington
27 October 1973	Southampton	H	0–1	18,753	
3 November 1973	Norwich City	A	0–1	20,565	
10 November 1973	Newcastle United	H	1–0	20,726	Rofe
17 November 1973	Burnley	H	2–0	21,761	Glover, Stringfellow
24 November 1973	Birmingham City	A	0–3	27,719	
1 December 1973	Tottenham Hotspur	H	3–0	22,088	Glover (2), Earle
8 December 1973	Chelsea	A	2–3	20,676	Worthington, Earle
15 December 1973	Queens Park Rangers	H	2–0	17,614	Worthington, Glover
22 December 1973	Coventry City	A	2–1	23,324	Glover, Worthington
26 December 1973	Wolverhampton Wanderers	H	2–2	30,547	Worthington (2, 1 pen)
29 December 1973	Arsenal	H	2–0	25,860	Worthington, Earle
1 January 1974	Liverpool	A	1–1	39,110	Weller
12 January 1974	Manchester City	A	0–2	27,488	
19 January 1974	Ipswich Town	H	5–0	24,280	Worthington (3, 2 pens), Munro, Beattie (own goal)
2 February 1974	Queens Park Rangers	A	0–0	22,646	
9 February 1974	West Ham United	H	0–1	27,032	
23 February 1974	Sheffield United	H	1–1	24,107	Worthington
26 February 1974	Leeds United	A	1–1	30,489	Weller
2 March 1974	Everton	H	2–1	22,286	Worthington, Earle
16 March 1974	Derby County	H	0–1	30,423	
18 March 1974	Southampton	A	0–1	26,600	
23 March 1974	Newcastle United	A	1–1	32,116	Waters
6 April 1974	Birmingham City	H	3–3	28,486	Cross, Glover (2)
13 April 1974	Burnley	A	0–0	18,115	
15 April 1974	Stoke City	A	0–1	21,468	
16 April 1974	Stoke City	H	1–1	21,682	Worthington
20 April 1974	Chelsea	H	3–0	22,828	Worthington (2), Glover
23 April 1974	Wolverhampton Wanderers	A	0–1	23,574	
27 April 1974	Tottenham Hotspur	A	0–1	20,110	
29 April 1974	Norwich City	H	3–0	16,786	Worthington (2), Earle

=== FA Cup ===
Round	Date	Opponent	Venue	Result	Attendance	Goalscorers
Third round	5 January 1974	Tottenham Hotspur	H	1–0	36,433	Earle
Fourth round	26 January 1974	Fulham	A	1–1	26,105	Glover
Fourth round replay	30 January 1974	Fulham	H	2–1 (a.e.t.)	37,130	Glover, Worthington
Fifth round	16 February 1974	Luton Town	A	4–0	25,712	Earle (2), Worthington, Weller
Quarter-final	9 March 1974	Queens Park Rangers	A	2–0	34,078	Waters (2)
Semi-final	30 March 1974	Liverpool	N	0–0	60,000	
Semi-final replay	3 April 1974	Liverpool	N	1–3	55,619	Glover 48'
Third place play-off	9 May 1974	Burnley	H	0–1	4,432	

=== League Cup ===
Round	Date	Opponent	Venue	Result	Attendance	Goalscorers
R2	8 October 1973	Hull City	H	3–3	9,777	Weller (2), Worthington
R2R	31 October 1973	Hull City	A	2–3	16,003	Stringfellow, Worthington

=== Texaco Cup ===
Round	Date	Opponent	Venue	Result	Attendance	Goalscorers
R1 1st leg	19 September 1973	Ayr United	A	1–1	9,720	McAnespie (own goal)
R1 2nd leg	3 October 1973	Ayr United	H	2–0 (won 3-1 on agg)	8,004	Stringfellow, Birchenall
R2 1st leg	24 October 1973	Dundee United	H	1–1	8,036	Worthington (pen)
R2 2nd leg	7 November 1973	Dundee United	A	0–1 (lost 1-2 on agg)	7,699	

== Squad ==
Note: Flags indicate national team as defined under FIFA eligibility rules; some limited exceptions apply. Players may hold more than one non-FIFA nationality.

Pos.	Nation	Player
GK	ENG	Peter Shilton
DF	ENG	Steve Whitworth
DF	ENG	Dennis Rofe
MF	ENG	Mike Stringfellow
DF	ENG	Malcolm Munro
DF	ENG	Graham Cross
MF	ENG	Keith Weller
MF	ENG	Jon Sammels
FW	ENG	Frank Worthington
MF	ENG	Alan Birchenall
MF	ENG	Len Glover
MF	ENG	John Farrington
FW	ENG	Malcolm Partridge

Pos.	Nation	Player
DF	SCO	Malcolm Manley
DF	ENG	Alan Woollett
DF	ENG	Joe Jopling
FW	ENG	Steve Earle
MF	ENG	David Tomlin
DF	ENG	Steve Yates
MF	IRL	Joe Waters
DF	ENG	Pat Kruse
GK	ENG	Mark Wallington
MF	IRL	Tom Kilkelly
FW	ENG	Bob Lee
GK	ENG	Carl Jayes
