= 1971–72 Leicester City F.C. season =

1971–72 season of Leicester City

Leicester City
1971–72 season
- Chairman: Leonard Shipman
- Manager: Jimmy Bloomfield
- First Division: 12th
- FA Cup: Fourth round
- League Cup: Second round
- FA Charity Shield: Winners
- Anglo-Italian Cup: 3rd
- Top goalscorer: League: Brown (7); All: Weller (9)
- Average home league attendance: 28,536
Home colours

During the 1971–72 English football season, Leicester City F.C. competed in the Football League First Division.

== Season summary ==
In the 1971–72 season, Jimmy Bloomfield was appointed as new Leicester boss for the new season, and kept them in the First Division in their first season back in the top flight after a 2-year absence with a satisfying 12th-place finish. Unusually, due to Division One champions Arsenal's commitments in European competition, Division Two winners Leicester were invited to play FA Cup winners Liverpool in the Charity Shield, winning it for the first time, by 1-0.

== Final league table ==
Pos	Team	Pld	W	D	L	GF	GA	GAv	Pts	Qualification or relegation
10	Sheffield United	42	17	12	13	61	60	1.017	46	Qualification for the Watney Cup (Note: Wolverhampton Wanderers and Sheffield United qualified for the Watney Cup as the two teams with the most goals that hadn't already qualified for a European competition.)
11	Newcastle United	42	15	11	16	49	52	0.942	41	
12	Leicester City	42	13	13	16	41	46	0.891	39	
13	Ipswich Town	42	11	16	15	39	53	0.736	38	
14	West Ham United	42	12	12	18	47	51	0.922	36	

Source: World Football
Rules for classification: 1) Points; 2) Goal average; 3) Goals scored

== Results ==
Leicester City's score comes first

=== Legend ===
Win	Draw	Loss

=== Football League First Division ===
Date	Opponent	Venue	Result	Attendance	Scorers
14 August 1971	Huddersfield Town	A	2–2	16,285	Brown, Nish
18 August 1971	Nottingham Forest	H	2–1	32,079	Brown, O'Kane (own goal)
21 August 1971	Derby County	H	0–2	35,460	
25 August 1971	Stoke City	A	1–3	21,678	Brown
28 August 1971	Liverpool	A	2–3	50,970	Fern, Farrington
1 September 1971	Southampton	H	0–1	22,055	
4 September 1971	Manchester City	H	0–0	25,238	
11 September 1971	Ipswich Town	A	2–1	18,483	Sammels, Kellard
18 September 1971	Sheffield United	H	0–1	30,143	
25 September 1971	Arsenal	A	0–3	40,201	
2 October 1971	Crystal Palace	H	0–0	28,493	
9 October 1971	West Ham United	A	1–1	31,060	Cross
16 October 1971	Huddersfield Town	H	2–0	22,412	Sammels, Weller
23 October 1971	West Bromwich Albion	A	1–0	23,088	Weller
30 October 1971	Chelsea	H	1–1	36,574	Birchenall
6 November 1971	Leeds United	A	1–2	39,877	Brown
13 November 1971	Newcastle United	H	3–0	28,792	Brown, Sammels, Fern
20 November 1971	Manchester United	A	2–3	48,757	Birchenall, Glover
27 November 1971	Everton	H	0–0	29,662	
4 December 1971	Coventry City	A	1–1	26,300	Brown
11 December 1971	Tottenham Hotspur	H	0–1	30,721	
18 December 1971	Manchester City	A	1–1	29,524	Weller
27 December 1971	Wolverhampton Wanderers	H	1–2	37,966	Sammels
1 January 1972	Sheffield United	A	1–1	34,406	Sjoberg
8 January 1972	Liverpool	H	1–0	26,421	Brown
22 January 1972	Nottingham Forest	A	2–1	27,250	Weller, Birchenall
29 January 1972	Stoke City	H	2–1	26,931	Glover, Farrington
12 February 1972	West Bromwich Albion	H	0–1	24,225	
19 February 1972	Chelsea	A	1–2	38,783	Glover
4 March 1972	Newcastle United	A	0–2	25,256	
11 March 1972	West Ham United	H	2–0	23,345	Nish (2)
18 March 1972	Derby County	A	0–3	34,019	
22 March 1972	Leeds United	H	0–0	32,152	
25 March 1972	Ipswich Town	H	1–0	19,769	Tomlin
1 April 1972	Wolverhampton Wanderers	A	1–0	23,981	Shaw (own goal)
3 April 1972	Crystal Palace	A	1–1	23,736	Fern
4 April 1972	Arsenal	H	0–0	27,431	
8 April 1972	Manchester United	H	2–0	35,970	Weller, Birchenall
11 April 1972	Southampton	A	0–1	18,752	
15 April 1972	Everton	A	0–0	33,342	
22 April 1972	Coventry City	H	1–0	24,254	Glover
29 April 1972	Tottenham Hotspur	A	3–4	19,631	Glover, Sammels (pen), Partridge

=== FA Cup ===
Round	Date	Opponent	Venue	Result	Attendance	Goalscorers
R3	15 January 1972	Wolverhampton Wanderers	A	1–1	38,121	Farrington
R3R	19 January 1972	Wolverhampton Wanderers	H	2–0	37,060	Farrington, Glover
R4	5 February 1972	Leyton Orient	H	0–2	31,402	

=== League Cup ===
Round	Date	Opponent	Venue	Result	Attendance	Goalscorers
R2	7 September 1971	Charlton Athletic	A	1–3	11,694	Partridge

=== FA Charity Shield ===
Date	Opponent	Venue	Result	Attendance	Goalscorers
7 August 1971	Liverpool	H	1–0	25,014	Whitworth

=== Anglo-Italian Cup ===
Round	Date	Opponent	Venue	Result	Attendance	Goalscorers
Group 2	1 June 1972	Cagliari	A	0–1	4,000	
Group 2	4 June 1972	Atalanta	A	3–5	7,000	Weller, Sammels (2)
Group 2	7 June 1972	Cagliari	H	2–1	16,027	Weller, Nish
Group 2	10 June 1972	Atalanta	H	6–0	10,949	Glover, Nish, Sammels, Weller (2), Farrington

== Squad ==
Note: Flags indicate national team as defined under FIFA eligibility rules; some limited exceptions apply. Players may hold more than one non-FIFA nationality.

Pos.	Nation	Player
GK	ENG	Peter Shilton
DF	ENG	Steve Whitworth
DF	ENG	David Nish
MF	ENG	Bobby Kellard
DF	SCO	John Sjoberg
DF	ENG	Graham Cross
MF	ENG	John Farrington
FW	SCO	Alistair Brown
FW	ENG	Rodney Fern
MF	ENG	Jon Sammels
MF	ENG	Len Glover
MF	ENG	Willie Carlin
DF	ENG	Joe Jopling

Pos.	Nation	Player
DF	SCO	Malcolm Manley
DF	ENG	Alan Woollett
FW	ENG	Malcolm Partridge
MF	ENG	Paul Matthews
DF	ENG	Malcolm Munro
MF	ENG	Keith Weller
MF	ENG	Alan Birchenall
MF	ENG	David Tomlin
GK	ENG	Carl Jayes
GK	ENG	Mark Wallington
FW	ENG	Bob Lee
DF	ENG	Steve Yates
