= 1976–77 Leicester City F.C. season =

1976–77 season of Leicester City

Leicester City
1976–77 season
- Chairman: Walter Needham
- Manager: Jimmy Bloomfield
- First Division: 11th
- FA Cup: Third round
- League Cup: Second round
- Top goalscorer: Worthington (14)
- Average home league attendance: 18,806

During the 1976–77 English football season, Leicester City competed in the Football League First Division.

== Season summary ==
Leicester made a slow start to the season with six consecutive draws, but were fifth in the table and in the UEFA Cup places after thirteen games, despite scoring only thirteen goals. Following that though, the team suffered from a lack of consistency and finished the campaign with only one win from the final ten league matches, but managed an 11th place finish. A week after the end of the season, Jimmy Bloomfield resigned as manager.

== Final league table ==
Pos	Team	Pld	W	D	L	GF	GA	GD	Pts
9	Everton	42	14	14	14	62	64	−2	42
10	Leeds United	42	15	12	15	48	51	−3	42
11	Leicester City	42	12	18	12	47	60	−13	42
12	Middlesbrough	42	14	13	15	40	45	−5	41
13	Birmingham City	42	13	12	17	63	61	+2	38

Source: World Football
Rules for classification: 1) Points; 2) Goal difference; 3) Goals scored

== Results ==
Leicester City's score comes first

=== Legend ===
Win	Draw	Loss

=== Football League First Division ===
Date	Opponent	Venue	Result	Attendance	Scorers
21 August 1976	Manchester City	H	2–2	22,612	Alderson, Garland
24 August 1976	Sunderland	A	0–0	36,668	
28 August 1976	West Ham United	A	0–0	24,960	
4 September 1976	Everton	H	1–1	18,083	Worthington
11 September 1976	Ipswich Town	A	0–0	19,610	
18 September 1976	Queens Park Rangers	H	2–2	18,439	Rofe, Garland
25 September 1976	Aston Villa	A	0–2	36,652	
29 September 1976	Stoke City	H	1–0	15,391	Worthington
2 October 1976	Coventry City	A	1–1	20,957	Worthington
16 October 1976	Bristol City	A	1–0	20,102	Worthington
23 October 1976	Arsenal	H	4–1	19,351	Weller (2), Earle, Worthington (pen)
27 October 1976	Liverpool	H	0–1	29,384	
30 October 1976	Middlesbrough	A	1–0	24,288	Worthington
6 November 1976	Norwich City	H	1–1	17,781	Worthington
9 November 1976	Liverpool	A	1–5	39,851	Worthington
20 November 1976	Manchester United	H	1–1	26,421	Garland
27 November 1976	Leeds United	A	2–2	29,713	Worthington, Earle
4 December 1976	Birmingham City	H	2–6	20,388	Kember, Worthington (pen)
11 December 1976	West Bromwich Albion	A	2–2	19,049	Weller, Sims
18 December 1976	Tottenham Hotspur	H	2–1	16,397	Blockley, Earle
27 December 1976	Derby County	A	0–1	32,892	
1 January 1977	Norwich City	A	2–3	21,531	Sammels, Earle
15 January 1977	Sunderland	H	2–0	16,051	Alderson, Earle
22 January 1977	Manchester City	A	0–5	37,609	
5 February 1977	West Ham United	H	2–0	16,201	Worthington, Weller
12 February 1977	Everton	A	2–1	28,024	Earle, Alderson
19 February 1977	Ipswich Town	H	1–0	21,134	Earle
26 February 1977	Queens Park Rangers	A	2–3	20,356	Earle, Sammels
5 March 1977	Aston Villa	H	1–1	22,038	Sammels (pen)
12 March 1977	Coventry City	H	3–1	16,766	Alderson, Earle, Worthington
15 March 1977	Middlesbrough	H	3–3	13,483	Worthington, Kember, Earle
19 March 1977	Stoke City	A	1–0	14,087	Worthington
26 March 1977	Bristol City	H	0–0	16,454	
2 April 1977	Arsenal	A	0–3	23,013	
9 April 1977	Newcastle United	A	0–0	32,300	
12 April 1977	Derby County	H	1–1	22,393	Alderson
16 April 1977	Manchester United	A	1–1	49,161	Earle
30 April 1977	Birmingham City	A	1–1	20,836	Earle
4 May 1977	Newcastle United	H	1–0	14,289	Earle
7 May 1977	West Bromwich Albion	H	0–5	18,139	
14 May 1977	Tottenham Hotspur	A	0–2	26,094	
16 May 1977	Leeds United	H	0–1	13,642	

=== FA Cup ===
Round	Date	Opponent	Venue	Result	Attendance	Goalscorers
R3	8 January 1977	Aston Villa	H	0–1	27,112	

=== League Cup ===
Round	Date	Opponent	Venue	Result	Attendance	Goalscorers
R2	1 September 1976	Wrexham	A	0–1	9,776	

== Squad ==
Note: Flags indicate national team as defined under FIFA eligibility rules; some limited exceptions apply. Players may hold more than one non-FIFA nationality.

Pos.	Nation	Player
GK	ENG	Mark Wallington
DF	ENG	Steve Whitworth
DF	ENG	Dennis Rofe
MF	ENG	Steve Kember
DF	ENG	Alan Woollett
DF	ENG	Steve Sims
MF	ENG	Keith Weller
MF	ENG	Jon Sammels
FW	ENG	Frank Worthington
MF	SCO	Brian Alderson

Pos.	Nation	Player
FW	ENG	Steve Earle
DF	ENG	Jeff Blockley
FW	ENG	Chris Garland
MF	ENG	Alan Birchenall
MF	ENG	Steve Bicknell
FW	ENG	Bob Lee
MF	ENG	Winston White
DF	ENG	Steve Yates
DF	ENG	Larry May
DF	ENG	Peter Welsh
