= 1972–73 Leicester City F.C. season =

1972–73 season of Leicester City

Leicester City
1972–73 season
- Chairman: Leonard Shipman
- Manager: Jimmy Bloomfield
- First Division: 16th
- FA Cup: Third round
- League Cup: Second round
- Texaco Cup: Second round
- Top goalscorer: League: Worthington (10); All: Worthington (13)
- Average home league attendance: 22,706
Home colours

During the 1972–73 English football season, Leicester City F.C. competed in the Football League First Division.

== Season summary ==
The 1972–73 season was a disappointing one for the Foxes, finishing in 16th place in the final standings. Their only highlights during the season were a 3-2 win over champions Liverpool at Filbert Street with a Keith Weller hat-trick after being 2-0 down and also holding them to a 0-0 draw at Anfield on the final day. Results generally though throughout were poor and Leicester at one point were bottom at end of November. A lack of goals as well were hard to come by but their tight defence with the experience of Cross and Manley proved dividends and the Foxes ensured survival with a solid run of just 2 defeats in their final 12 league games.

== Final league table ==
Pos	Team	Pld	W	D	L	GF	GA	GAv	Pts	Qualification or relegation
14	Sheffield United	42	15	10	17	51	59	0.864	40	
15	Stoke City	42	14	10	18	61	56	1.089	38	Qualification for the Watney Cup (Note: West Ham United and Stoke City qualified for the Watney Cup as the two teams with the most goals that hadn't already qualified for a European competition.)
16	Leicester City	42	10	17	15	40	46	0.870	37	
17	Everton	42	13	11	18	41	49	0.837	37	
18	Manchester United	42	12	13	17	44	60	0.733	37	

Source: World Football
Rules for classification: 1) Points; 2) Goal average; 3) Goals scored

== Results ==
Leicester City's score comes first

=== Legend ===
Win	Draw	Loss

=== Football League First Division ===
Date	Opponent	Venue	Result	Attendance	Scorers
12 August 1972	Arsenal	H	0–1	28,009	
16 August 1972	Chelsea	H	1–1	22,873	Farrington
19 August 1972	West Ham United	A	2–5	25,490	Stringfellow, Glover
23 August 1972	Manchester United	A	1–1	40,067	Worthington
26 August 1972	Coventry City	H	0–0	25,894	
30 August 1972	Liverpool	H	3–2	28,694	Weller (3)
2 September 1972	Manchester City	A	0–1	27,233	
9 September 1972	Everton	H	1–2	21,080	Sammels
16 September 1972	Leeds United	A	1–3	33,930	Glover
23 September 1972	Wolverhampton Wanderers	H	1–1	20,817	Farrington
30 September 1972	Ipswich Town	A	2–0	17,811	Glover, Worthington
7 October 1972	Southampton	H	1–0	18,092	Sammels (pen)
14 October 1972	Derby County	A	1–2	31,841	Weller
21 October 1972	Norwich City	H	1–2	23,088	Weller
28 October 1972	Stoke City	A	0–1	24,421	
4 November 1972	Manchester United	H	2–2	32,575	Sammels, Farrington
11 November 1972	Chelsea	A	1–1	28,456	Sammels
18 November 1972	Tottenham Hotspur	H	0–1	22,707	
2 December 1972	West Bromwich Albion	H	3–1	15,307	Worthington (3)
9 December 1972	Birmingham City	A	1–1	32,481	Cross
16 December 1972	Sheffield United	A	0–2	17,111	
23 December 1972	Crystal Palace	H	2–1	16,962	Worthington (pen), Birchenall
26 December 1972	Wolverhampton Wanderers	A	0–2	22,022	
30 December 1972	West Ham United	H	2–1	19,341	Farrington, Worthington
1 January 1973	Newcastle United	A	2–2	30,868	Birchenall, Worthington
6 January 1973	Coventry City	A	2–3	25,067	Worthington, Weller
20 January 1973	Manchester City	H	1–1	18,761	Worthington
27 January 1973	Everton	A	1–0	31,531	Wright (own goal)
10 February 1973	Leeds United	H	2–0	35,976	Birchenall (2)
17 February 1973	Arsenal	A	0–1	42,047	
24 February 1973	Sheffield United	H	0–0	21,821	
3 March 1973	Southampton	A	0–0	14,134	
10 March 1973	Derby County	H	0–0	29,690	
17 March 1973	Norwich City	A	1–1	25,299	Glover
24 March 1973	Stoke City	H	2–0	18,743	Tomlin, Birchenall
31 March 1973	Newcastle United	H	0–0	18,712	
7 April 1973	West Bromwich Albion	A	0–1	15,235	
14 April 1973	Birmingham City	H	0–1	27,652	
20 April 1973	Crystal Palace	A	1–0	36,817	Weller
21 April 1973	Tottenham Hotspur	A	1–1	23,312	Weller
24 April 1973	Ipswich Town	H	1–1	20,373	Cross
28 April 1973	Liverpool	A	0–0	56,202	

=== FA Cup ===
Round	Date	Opponent	Venue	Result	Attendance	Goalscorers
R3	13 January 1973	Arsenal	A	2–2	36,433	Worthington, Farrington
R3R	17 January 1973	Arsenal	H	1–2	32,873	Farrington

=== League Cup ===
Round	Date	Opponent	Venue	Result	Attendance	Goalscorers
R2	6 September 1972	Norwich City	A	1–2	22,498	Sammels

=== Texaco Cup ===
Round	Date	Opponent	Venue	Result	Attendance	Goalscorers
R1 1st leg	13 September 1972	Dundee United	H	1–1	4,000	
R1 2nd leg	27 September 1972	Dundee United	A	2–2 (won 3-0 on pens)	7,000	Weller, Sammels (2)
R2 1st leg	24 October 1972	Norwich City	H	2–0	16,027	Weller, Nish
R2 2nd leg	8 November 1972	Norwich City	A	0–2 (lost 3-4 on pens)	10,949	

== Squad ==
Note: Flags indicate national team as defined under FIFA eligibility rules; some limited exceptions apply. Players may hold more than one non-FIFA nationality.

Pos.	Nation	Player
GK	ENG	Peter Shilton
DF	ENG	Steve Whitworth
DF	ENG	David Nish
DF	ENG	Alan Woollett
DF	SCO	John Sjoberg
DF	SCO	Malcolm Manley
MF	ENG	John Farrington
MF	ENG	Jon Sammels
MF	ENG	Keith Weller
MF	ENG	Alan Birchenall
MF	ENG	Len Glover
FW	ENG	Malcolm Partridge

Pos.	Nation	Player
DF	ENG	Graham Cross
MF	ENG	Mike Stringfellow
FW	ENG	Frank Worthington
DF	ENG	Dennis Rofe
DF	ENG	Malcolm Munro
GK	ENG	Mark Wallington
MF	ENG	David Tomlin
DF	ENG	Joe Jopling
FW	ENG	Bob Lee
DF	ENG	Steve Yates
GK	ENG	Carl Jayes
