= 1974–75 Leicester City F.C. season =

1974–75 season of Leicester City

Leicester City
1974–75 season
- Chairman: Tom Bloor
- Manager: Jimmy Bloomfield
- First Division: 18th
- FA Cup: Fifth round
- League Cup: Third round
- Top goalscorer: League: Worthington (18); All: Worthington (19)
- Average home league attendance: 23,765
Home colours

During the 1974–75 English football season, Leicester City F.C. competed in the Football League First Division.

== Season summary ==
In the 1974–75 season, Leicester could not improve on last season's 9th place, finishing 9 places lower. Goalkeeper Peter Shilton refused to sign a new contract and followed his mentor Gordon Banks by signing for Stoke City at a record fee for a goalkeeper of £325,000 in November and resulted in Mark Wallington starting the season in goal. From early November to late February, the Foxes did not register a league win in 13 games which saw them slip to bottom of the table and heading for relegation but again their FA Cup progress gave them a boost in their league form. As the season drew to a close, Chris Garland improved their strike force by scoring 8 goals in 10 matches, which was enough to save the Foxes from the drop in 18th and 3 points clear of relegation.

== Final league table ==
Pos	Team	Pld	W	D	L	GF	GA	GAv	Pts	Qualification or relegation
16	Arsenal	42	13	11	18	47	49	0.959	37	
17	Birmingham City	42	14	9	19	53	61	0.869	37	
18	Leicester City	42	12	12	18	46	60	0.767	36	
19	Tottenham Hotspur	42	13	8	21	52	63	0.825	34	
20	Luton Town (R)	42	11	11	20	47	65	0.723	33	Relegation to the Second Division

Source: World Football
Rules for classification: 1) Points; 2) Goal average; 3) Goals scored
(R) Relegated

== Results ==
Leicester City's score comes first

=== Legend ===
Win	Draw	Loss

=== Football League First Division ===
Date	Opponent	Venue	Result	Attendance	Scorers
17 August 1974	Arsenal	H	0–1	26,448	
20 August 1974	Birmingham City	A	4–3	27,961	Weller, Worthington (2), Earle
24 August 1974	Liverpool	A	1–2	49,398	Weller
27 August 1974	Birmingham City	H	1–1	24,018	Worthington
31 August 1974	Carlisle United	H	1–1	20,658	Worthington (pen)
7 September 1974	Wolverhampton Wanderers	A	1–1	20,564	Glover
14 September 1974	Queens Park Rangers	H	3–1	19,763	Worthington (2), Glover
21 September 1974	West Ham United	A	2–6	21,377	Worthington (2, 1 pen)
28 September 1974	Coventry City	H	0–1	21,354	
5 October 1974	Luton Town	H	0–0	19,024	
12 October 1974	Derby County	A	0–1	24,753	
19 October 1974	Sheffield United	H	3–0	18,433	Worthington (2), Glover
26 October 1974	Newcastle United	A	1–0	34,988	Earle
2 November 1974	Burnley	H	1–0	19,981	Sammels
9 November 1974	Chelsea	A	0–0	23,915	
16 November 1974	Tottenham Hotspur	H	1–2	23,244	Earle
23 November 1974	Manchester City	A	1–4	31,628	Birchenall
30 November 1974	Stoke City	A	0–1	29,793	
7 December 1974	Everton	H	0–2	21,451	
10 December 1974	Middlesbrough	A	0–3	22,699	
14 December 1974	Arsenal	A	0–0	20,849	
20 December 1974	Ipswich Town	H	0–1	16,636	
26 December 1974	Queens Park Rangers	A	2–4	17,311	Lee (2)
28 December 1974	Leeds United	H	0–2	29,699	
11 January 1975	Everton	A	0–3	31,985	
18 January 1975	Stoke City	H	1–1	21,736	Glover
1 February 1975	Chelsea	H	1–1	23,759	Weller
8 February 1975	Burnley	A	0–2	16,352	
22 February 1975	Tottenham Hotspur	A	3–0	20,937	Stringfellow, Worthington, Sammels
1 March 1975	Carlisle United	A	1–0	12,676	Worthington
8 March 1975	Manchester City	H	1–0	23,059	Lee
15 March 1975	Coventry City	A	2–2	23,139	Worthington, Lee
19 March 1975	Liverpool	H	1–1	28,012	Worthington
22 March 1975	Wolverhampton Wanderers	H	3–2	25,070	Garland (3)
29 March 1975	Ipswich Town	A	1–2	28,745	Worthington
31 March 1975	Leeds United	A	2–2	29,898	Lee, Garland
1 April 1975	West Ham United	H	3–0	30,408	Worthington (pen), Garland (2)
5 April 1975	Newcastle United	H	4–0	23,638	Garland (2), Lee, Worthington
9 April 1975	Middlesbrough	H	1–0	24,531	Worthington
12 April 1975	Luton Town	A	0–3	18,298	
19 April 1975	Derby County	H	0–0	38,143	
26 April 1975	Sheffield United	A	0–4	28,947	

=== FA Cup ===
Round	Date	Opponent	Venue	Result	Attendance	Goalscorers
R3	4 January 1975	Oxford United	H	3–1	21,643	Worthington, Earle (2)
R4	25 January 1975	Leatherhead	H	3–2	32,090	Sammels, Earle, Weller
R5	15 February 1975	Arsenal	H	0–0	43,841	
R5R	19 February 1975	Arsenal	A	1–1 (a.e.t.)	35,009	Birchenall
R5R2	24 February 1975	Arsenal	A	0–1 (a.e.t.)	39,025	

=== League Cup ===
Round	Date	Opponent	Venue	Result	Attendance	Goalscorers
R2	10 September 1974	Arsenal	A	1–1	20,788	Birchenall
R2R	18 September 1974	Arsenal	H	2–1	17,303	Munro, Glover
R3	8 October 1974	Middlesbrough	A	0–1	23,901	

== Squad ==
Note: Flags indicate national team as defined under FIFA eligibility rules; some limited exceptions apply. Players may hold more than one non-FIFA nationality.

Pos.	Nation	Player
GK	ENG	Peter Shilton
DF	ENG	Steve Whitworth
DF	ENG	Dennis Rofe
MF	ENG	Jon Sammels
DF	ENG	Malcolm Munro
DF	ENG	Graham Cross
MF	ENG	Keith Weller
FW	ENG	Steve Earle
FW	ENG	Frank Worthington
MF	ENG	Alan Birchenall
MF	ENG	Len Glover
DF	ENG	Pat Kruse

Pos.	Nation	Player
MF	IRL	Joe Waters
DF	ENG	Alan Woollett
GK	ENG	Mark Wallington
FW	ENG	Malcolm Partridge
DF	ENG	Steve Yates
MF	ENG	Mike Stringfellow
GK	ENG	Carl Jayes
GK	ENG	John Farmer
FW	ENG	Bob Lee
MF	ENG	David Tomlin
DF	ENG	Jeff Blockley
FW	ENG	Chris Garland
