= 1977–78 Leicester City F.C. season =

1977–78 season of Leicester City

Leicester City
1977–78 season
- Chairman: Walter Needham
- Manager: Frank McLintock (until 5 April); Ian MacFarlane (caretaker from 5 April)
- First Division: 22nd (relegated)
- FA Cup: Fourth round
- League Cup: Second round
- Top goalscorer: Salmons/Davies (4)
- Average home league attendance: 17,768

During the 1977–78 English football season, Leicester City F.C. competed in the Football League First Division.

== Season summary ==
In the 1977–78 season, Frank McLintock returned to Leicester, this time as a manager. However, he endured a difficult time in charge, as the Foxes went through a spell where they had one win in 26 matches and as a result finished bottom and were relegated back to the second tier after 7 years in the top flight. McLintock was sacked on 5 April and Ian MacFarlane took charge of the team for the final 5 games of Leicester's dismal season.

== Final league table ==
Pos	Team	Pld	W	D	L	GF	GA	GD	Pts	Qualification or relegation
18	Ipswich Town	42	11	13	18	47	61	−14	35	Qualification for the European Cup Winners' Cup first round (Note: Ipswich Town qualified for the European Cup Winners' Cup as the 1977–78 FA Cup winners.)
19	Queens Park Rangers	42	9	15	18	47	64	−17	33	
20	West Ham United (R)	42	12	8	22	52	69	−17	32	Relegation to the Second Division
21	Newcastle United (R)	42	6	10	26	42	78	−36	22	Relegation to the Second Division
22	Leicester City (R)	42	5	12	25	26	70	−44	22	Relegation to the Second Division

Source: World Football
Rules for classification: 1) Points; 2) Goal difference; 3) Goals scored
(R) Relegated

== Results ==
Leicester City's score comes first

=== Legend ===
Win	Draw	Loss

=== Football League First Division ===
Date	Opponent	Venue	Result	Attendance	Scorers
20 August 1977	Manchester City	A	0–0	45,963	
24 August 1977	West Ham United	H	1–0	18,310	Kember
27 August 1977	Bristol City	H	0–0	17,011	
3 September 1977	Queens Park Rangers	A	0–3	14,516	
10 September 1977	Everton	H	1–5	16,425	Sims
17 September 1977	Arsenal	A	1–2	27,371	Worthington
24 September 1977	Nottingham Forest	H	0–3	21,447	
1 October 1977	Wolverhampton Wanderers	A	0–3	20,009	
5 October 1977	Chelsea	A	0–0	19,575	
8 October 1977	Aston Villa	H	0–2	20,276	
15 October 1977	Coventry City	H	1–2	20,205	Sammels (pen)
22 October 1977	Norwich City	A	0–2	17,684	
29 October 1977	Leeds United	H	0–0	20,128	
5 November 1977	West Bromwich Albion	A	0–2	20,082	
12 November 1977	Ipswich Town	H	2–1	13,779	Williams, Salmons
19 November 1977	Birmingham City	A	1–1	21,208	Waddle
26 November 1977	Liverpool	H	0–4	26,051	
3 December 1977	Newcastle United	A	0–2	20,112	
10 December 1977	Derby County	H	1–1	21,199	Kelly
17 December 1977	Ipswich Town	A	0–1	16,905	
26 December 1977	Middlesbrough	H	0–0	18,476	
27 December 1977	Manchester United	A	1–3	57,396	Goodwin
31 December 1977	West Ham United	A	2–3	25,455	Kember, Sims
2 January 1978	Manchester City	H	0–1	24,041	
14 January 1978	Bristol City	A	0–0	19,704	
21 January 1978	Queens Park Rangers	H	0–0	16,288	
4 February 1978	Everton	A	0–2	33,707	
11 February 1978	Arsenal	H	1–1	15,780	Williams
25 February 1978	Wolverhampton Wanderers	H	1–0	15,763	Goodwin
4 March 1978	Aston Villa	A	0–0	29,971	
11 March 1978	Coventry City	A	0–1	24,421	
14 March 1978	Nottingham Forest	A	0–1	32,355	
18 March 1978	Norwich City	H	2–2	13,077	Williams, Davies
25 March 1978	Manchester United	H	2–3	20,299	Smith, Salmons
27 March 1978	Middlesbrough	A	1–0	15,534	Hughes
28 March 1978	Leeds United	A	1–5	21,145	Davies (pen)
1 April 1978	West Bromwich Albion	H	0–1	14,637	
8 April 1978	Liverpool	A	2–3	42,979	Hughes, White
15 April 1978	Birmingham City	H	1–4	15,431	Salmons
22 April 1978	Derby County	A	1–4	18,829	Davies
26 April 1978	Chelsea	H	0–2	12,970	
29 April 1978	Newcastle United	H	3–0	11,530	Goodwin, Davies, Salmons

=== FA Cup ===
Round	Date	Opponent	Venue	Result	Attendance	Goalscorers
R3	7 January 1978	Hull City	A	1–0	12,374	Armstrong
R4	28 January 1978	Walsall	A	0–1	17,421	

=== League Cup ===
Round	Date	Opponent	Venue	Result	Attendance	Goalscorers
R2	30 August 1977	Portsmouth	A	0–2	13,842	

== Squad ==
Note: Flags indicate national team as defined under FIFA eligibility rules; some limited exceptions apply. Players may hold more than one non-FIFA nationality.

Pos.	Nation	Player
GK	ENG	Mark Wallington
DF	ENG	Steve Whitworth
DF	ENG	Dennis Rofe
MF	ENG	Steve Kember
DF	ENG	Steve Sims
DF	ENG	David Webb
MF	ENG	Keith Weller
MF	ENG	Jon Sammels
FW	ENG	Geoff Salmons
MF	SCO	Eddie Kelly
MF	SCO	Tommy Williams
FW	SCO	Billy Hughes
FW	ENG	Roger Davies
MF	ENG	Mark Goodwin
MF	SCO	Brian Alderson

Pos.	Nation	Player
DF	ENG	Alan Woollett
MF	ENG	George Armstrong
FW	ENG	Alan Waddle
FW	ENG	Dean Smith
DF	ENG	Jeff Blockley
FW	ENG	Frank Worthington
FW	ENG	Steve Earle
MF	SCO	Lammie Robertson
MF	ENG	Winston White
FW	ENG	Trevor Christie
DF	ENG	Larry May
MF	ENG	Neville Hamilton
MF	ENG	Derek Dawkins
DF	ENG	Kevin Farmer
