= Chris Garland =

English footballer (1949–2023)

Personal information
- Date of birth: 24 April 1949
- Place of birth: Bristol, England
- Date of death: 13 July 2023 (aged 74)
- Place of death: Newport, Wales
- Height: 5 ft 11 in (1.80 m)
- Position: Forward

Youth career
- 1964–1966: Bristol City

Senior career*
| Years | Team | Apps | (Gls) |
| 1966–1971 | Bristol City | 143 | (31) |
| 1971–1974 | Chelsea | 92 | (22) |
| 1974–1976 | Leicester City | 55 | (15) |
| 1976–1983 | Bristol City | 64 | (11) |
| 1981 | → Västerås SK (loan) | 13 | (4) |
| 1982 | Caroline Hill | | |
- Gloucester City
| Total | | 367+ | (83+) |

International career
| 1970 | England U23 | 1 | (0) |

Managerial career
- Minehead
- * Club domestic league appearances and goals

Christopher Garland (24 April 1949 – 13 July 2023) was an English footballer who played in all four divisions of the Football League. He was capped once by England at under-23 level.

A forward, he began his professional career with local club Bristol City in April 1966. He was sold to Chelsea for £100,000 in 1971, and went on to play on the losing side of the 1972 League Cup final. He joined Leicester City in 1974, before returning to Bristol City in November 1976. The club underwent a dramatic decline from the First Division to the Fourth Division and he had to accept a termination of his contract for half the amount due in 1982, though he went on to remain at the club for another season. He later played for Gloucester City, coached at Yeovil Town and managed Minehead.

== Playing career ==
=== Bristol City ===
Garland was born on 24 April 1949 in Ashton Gate, Bristol, England, the second son of Grace and George William Henry, a factory worker and lorry driver respectively. He attended a trial for England Schoolboys, and was signed up as an apprentice at Bristol City in 1964. However, he broke his leg in a park game with friends, and was severely reprimanded by manager Fred Ford. He recovered and went on to sign professional terms with the club five days after his 17th birthday. He made his Second Division debut at Ashton Gate on 3 December 1966 in a 2–0 victory over Preston North End. This was his only appearance of the season as the "Robins" went on to finish in 15th place.

Ford was sacked early in the 1967–68 campaign, and caretaker-manager Les Bardsley made wholesale changes to the first eleven, including a recall for Garland. He played all three of Bardsley's games in charge, and scored in the 3–3 draw with Hull City. He started in new manager Alan Dicks' second game in charge, and remained a first team regular throughout the rest of the season, scoring nine goals in 32 league and cup games. In the FA Cup the club beat Bristol derby rivals Bristol Rovers and Middlesbrough, before losing 2–0 to Leeds United in a bad tempered game that saw Gary Sprake sent off for punching Garland in the jaw.

Garland formed an effective strike partnership with big target man John Galley in the 1968–69 and 1969–70 seasons, and was linked with moves away to bigger clubs. On 8 April 1970, Garland won his only international cap, for England under-23 in a 4–1 win over Bulgaria at Home Park; he was a substitute for Paul Edwards. City finished in 19th place in the 1970–71 season, four points above the relegation zone.

=== Chelsea ===
Garland was sold to Dave Sexton's Chelsea for £100,000 in September 1971. He was signed as a squad player and found first team opportunities limited, especially after spending a month out injured following a bad tackle from Nottingham Forest's Barry Lyons. He scored his first goal for the club in his fifth appearance, in a League Cup semi-final win over Tottenham Hotspur; he also scored in the second leg. He went on to sing with the rest of the team in Blue Is the Colour, a song to coincide with the final, which went on to reach number five in the charts. He played in the final at Wembley Stadium, in which Chelsea lost 2–1 to Stoke City. The "Pensioners" finished the 1971–72 campaign seventh in the First Division.

Garland finished as the club's joint top-scorer (with Peter Osgood) in the 1972–73 season with 11 goals, but Chelsea dropped to 12th in the league. The 1973–74 campaign was worse for the club, as star players like Osgood, Alan Hudson and David Webb and management fell out, and they dropped to 17th place in the league. Sexton was sacked in October 1974, and his replacement Ron Suart only lasted until April. Ron Suart allowed Garland to leave the club in March 1975 after receiving bids from Leicester City and Everton that matched the fee Chelsea had paid for Garland. In total he scored 31 goals in 114 league and cup appearances for Chelsea. Chelsea declined in the immediate aftermath of his departure, and suffered relegation at the end of the 1974–75 season.

=== Leicester City ===
Garland was sold to Leicester City for £100,000 on 12th March 1975; he agreed to join the club without speaking to Everton as he was convinced by manager Jimmy Bloomfield that Leicester were the right club for him. He scored eight goals in ten matches, including a hat trick in a 3–2 win over Wolverhampton Wanderers at Filbert Street on 22 March, to help the "Foxes" to finish three points above the First Division relegation zone at the end of the 1974–75 season. He was one of three regular rotated forwards in the 1975–76 campaign, alongside Frank Worthington and Bob Lee, and City went on to finish seventh; he claimed another hat trick in a 3–0 FA Cup victory over Sheffield United on 3 January. He scored three goals at the start of the 1976–77 season and broke Jeff Blockley's cheekbone after punching him during training for what Garland believed was Blockley's rough treatment of the club's apprentices. Garland submitted four transfer requests and was eventually sold back to his hometown club.

=== Return to Bristol City ===
Garland was sold to his former club Bristol City for a £110,000 fee in November 1976; during his absence the club had reached the First Division while still under the stewardship of Alan Dicks. Dicks planned to use Garland in a strike partnership with target man Paul Cheesley, but a severe injury to Cheesley meant that Garland had to play as the target man centre forward despite his small stature. He initially struggled in the role, but Dicks had no other suitable replacements other than Tom Ritchie, who also was not a natural centre forward. Despite a tough end-of-season schedule City managed to pick up enough points to narrowly avoid relegation in 1976–77, with Garland scoring winning goals against Leeds United and Liverpool.

Garland tore his cruciate ligaments early in the 1977–78 season and missed not only the rest of the campaign but also spent much of the 1978–79 and 1979–80 seasons struggling with the same injury. Dicks departed following relegation in 1979–80, and under Bob Houghton's stewardship they dropped immediately out of the Second Division in the 1980–81 campaign, with Garland again having limited involvement due to his knee and ligament injuries. Houghton sent him on loan to Västerås SK of the Swedish second Division to help him gain fitness. There he scored the winning goal against local rivals IFK Västerås, and helped the club to a third-place finish in 1981.

Garland rarely featured under Houghton, and when new manager Roy Hodgson arrived he informed Garland and seven teammates (Julian Marshall, Jimmy Mann, Geoff Merrick, Peter Aitken, David Rodgers, Trevor Tainton and Gerry Sweeney), known as the "Ashton Gate Eight", that they would have to take voluntary redundancy as part of a last-ditch plan to save the club, which was on the verge of folding; Garland agreed and lost £3,750. He and Merrick then spent six months playing in Hong Kong for Caroline Hill. City suffered a third successive relegation in 1981–82 after dropping out of the Third Division. After relegation to the Fourth Division, Garland would go on to be re-employed by Bristol City manager Terry Cooper for the 1982–83 season, playing as a non-contract player until February 1983, when he retired.

== Later life ==
After retiring, he spent two years selling fruit and vegetables door-to-door. He also featured in the Southern League for Gloucester City, before returning to professional football as a coach at Yeovil Town. During his time there he got his friend Ian Botham to play for the club and Yeovil won admission back into the Football Conference. However, his business was failing, and he developed gambling and drinking problems and was contemplating suicide at one stage. He entered the wine distribution business but again his business failed and he was declared bankrupt. He went on to work as a bookmaker's clerk, which only worsened his gambling addiction. He later spent time as manager of Western League side Minehead whilst working as an insurance salesman. He was diagnosed with Parkinson's disease in 1988.

Garland married Patricia Cooper in June 1970. They had two sons, Adam and Ryan, and one daughter, Jessica. Jessica is a former England netball international and in 2019 was appointed head coach of the England national netball team. The couple split after 25 years of marriage. After leaving Patricia he spent time sleeping rough, before he was housed by a property developer who also provided him with casual work. A testimonial with Manchester United raised £81,000 for Garland, which he split between himself and his ex-wife. He married again, to Ruth, in 2004. However his gambling problems remained, and he was again declared bankrupt a few years later. However, with funding from the Professional Footballers' Association (PFA) he was able to undergo pioneering surgery to help relieve his Parkinson's.

Garland died on 13 July 2023, at the age of 74.

== Honours ==
Chelsea

- Football League Cup runner-up: 1971–72
