= Malcolm Munro =

English footballer

Personal information
- Full name: Malcolm George Munro
- Date of birth: 21 May 1953 (age 73)
- Place of birth: Melton Mowbray, England
- Position: Central defender

Youth career
- 1968–1971: Leicester City

Senior career*
Years	Team	Apps	(Gls)
1971–1980	Leicester City	70	(1)
- * Club domestic league appearances and goals

Malcolm George Munro (born 21 May 1953) is an English former professional footballer who played in the Football League for Leicester City as a central defender.

== Career statistics ==
Appearances and goals by club, season and competition
Club	Season	League			FA Cup		League Cup		Total	
Club	Season	Division	Apps	Goals	Apps	Goals	Apps	Goals	Apps	Goals
Leicester City	1971–72	First Division	2	0	0	0	0	0	2	0
Leicester City	1972–73	First Division	3	0	0	0	0	0	3	0
Leicester City	1973–74	First Division	39	1	7	0	2	0	48	1
Leicester City	1974–75	First Division	26	0	2	0	3	0	31	1
Career total			70	1	9	0	1	0	84	2
