= 1971–72 in English football =

Football in England
- Season: 1971–72

Men's football
- First Division: Derby County
- Second Division: Norwich City
- Third Division: Aston Villa
- Fourth Division: Grimsby Town
- FA Cup: Leeds United
- Texaco Cup: Derby County
- League Cup: Stoke City
- Charity Shield: Leicester City

The 1971–72 season was the 92nd season of competitive football in England.

== Honours ==
Competition	Winner	Runner-up
First Division	Derby County (1)	Leeds United
Second Division	Norwich City	Birmingham City
Third Division	Aston Villa	Brighton & Hove Albion
Fourth Division	Grimsby Town	Southend United
FA Cup	Leeds United (1)	Arsenal
League Cup	Stoke City (1)	Chelsea
Charity Shield	Leicester City	Liverpool
Home Championship	Shared by England and Scotland	

Notes = Number in parentheses is the times that club has won that honour. * indicates new record for competition

== FA Cup ==
Leeds United won the FA Cup for the first time in their history by beating the previous year's winners, Arsenal, 1–0 in the final at Wembley. Allan Clarke scored the winning goal.

1971–72 marked the centenary of the FA Cup. Non-League club Hereford United of the Southern League provided one of the shocks of the season by knocking out Newcastle United 2–1 after extra time in the 3rd Round Replay.

== League Cup ==
Stoke City won the 1972 Football League Cup Final to claim the only major trophy in their history.

in the semi-final against West Ham United, John Ritchie's goal and a penalty save from Gordon Banks had earned Stoke a replay at Hillsborough, which ended in a draw. In the second semi-final replay, at Old Trafford, Stoke overcame a West Ham side forced to make Bobby Moore their stand-in goalkeeper, putting them through to the League Cup Final for the first time.

== Football League ==
=== First Division ===
Brian Clough, 37, won the first major trophy of his managerial career by guiding Derby County to their first league championship. They overcame Leeds United, Liverpool and Manchester City to win a four-horse race, with only a single point separating them. It was so close that when Manchester City won their last game of the season – against Derby on 22 April 1972 – they were top of the league by a point but had no chance of being champions, as Derby and Liverpool both had games in hand, were still to play each other, and both boasted a superior goal average to City's.

Although Derby beat Liverpool to pass Manchester City at the top of the table, Liverpool (two points back) and Leeds (one point back) each still had a game left. Leeds, who had won the FA Cup for the first time of their history, could have completed the double by avoiding defeat against Wolverhampton Wanderers, but instead lost 2–1. Liverpool could also have overtaken Derby by defeating Arsenal, but could muster only a 0–0 draw. This assured Derby the title by a single point.

There were bribery allegations from The Sun newspaper regarding Leeds's manager Don Revie, who stood accused of attempting to bribe Wolves on the final day of the season. Their captain Billy Bremner won a high court battle to clear his name of the allegations, with evidence provided by the Wolves striker Derek Dougan.

Stoke City won the League Cup, their first major trophy.

Nottingham Forest and Huddersfield Town lost their First Division status. 1971–72 was Huddersfield's last season in the top flight until 2017, and within a few seasons they fell into the Fourth Division.

Pos	Team	Pld	W	D	L	GF	GA	GAv	Pts	Qualification or relegation
1	Derby County (C)	42	24	10	8	69	33	2.091	58	Qualification for the European Cup first round
2	Leeds United	42	24	9	9	73	31	2.355	57	Qualification for the European Cup Winners' Cup first round (Note: Leeds United qualified for the European Cup Winners' Cup as the 1971-72 FA Cup winners.)
3	Liverpool	42	24	9	9	64	30	2.133	57	Qualification for the UEFA Cup first round
4	Manchester City	42	23	11	8	77	45	1.711	57	Qualification for the UEFA Cup first round
5	Arsenal	42	22	8	12	58	40	1.450	52	
6	Tottenham Hotspur	42	19	13	10	63	42	1.500	51	Qualification for the UEFA Cup first round (Note: Tottenham Hotspur qualified for the UEFA Cup as the 1971-72 UEFA Cup winners.)
7	Chelsea	42	18	12	12	58	49	1.184	48	
8	Manchester United	42	19	10	13	69	61	1.131	48	
9	Wolverhampton Wanderers	42	18	11	13	65	57	1.140	47	Qualification for the Watney Cup (Note: Wolverhampton Wanderers and Sheffield United qualified for the Watney Cup as the two teams with the most goals that hadn't already qualified for a European competition.)
10	Sheffield United	42	17	12	13	61	60	1.017	46	Qualification for the Watney Cup
11	Newcastle United	42	15	11	16	49	52	0.942	41	
12	Leicester City	42	13	13	16	41	46	0.891	39	
13	Ipswich Town	42	11	16	15	39	53	0.736	38	
14	West Ham United	42	12	12	18	47	51	0.922	36	
15	Everton	42	9	18	15	37	48	0.771	36	
16	West Bromwich Albion	42	12	11	19	42	54	0.778	35	
17	Stoke City	42	10	15	17	39	56	0.696	35	Qualification for the UEFA Cup first round
18	Coventry City	42	9	15	18	44	67	0.657	33	
19	Southampton	42	12	7	23	52	80	0.650	31	
20	Crystal Palace	42	8	13	21	39	65	0.600	29	
21	Nottingham Forest (R)	42	8	9	25	47	81	0.580	25	Relegation to the Second Division
22	Huddersfield Town (R)	42	6	13	23	27	59	0.458	25	Relegation to the Second Division

Source: World Football
Rules for classification: 1) Points; 2) Goal average; 3) Goals scored
(C) Champions; (R) Relegated

=== Second Division ===
Norwich City won the Second Division and were promoted along with Birmingham City. This marked the first time that Norwich City reached the top flight in their history, less than 70 years after the club was founded. Charlton Athletic and Watford were relegated.

Pos	Team	Pld	W	D	L	GF	GA	GAv	Pts	Qualification or relegation
1	Norwich City (C, P)	42	21	15	6	60	36	1.667	57	Promotion to the First Division
2	Birmingham City (P)	42	19	18	5	60	31	1.935	56	Promotion to the First Division
3	Millwall	42	19	17	6	64	46	1.391	55	
4	Queens Park Rangers	42	20	14	8	57	28	2.036	54	
5	Sunderland	42	17	16	9	67	57	1.175	50	
6	Blackpool	42	20	7	15	70	50	1.400	47	Qualification for the Watney Cup
7	Burnley	42	20	6	16	70	55	1.273	46	Qualification for the Watney Cup
8	Bristol City	42	18	10	14	61	49	1.245	46	
9	Middlesbrough	42	19	8	15	50	48	1.042	46	
10	Carlisle United	42	17	9	16	61	57	1.070	43	
11	Swindon Town	42	15	12	15	47	47	1.000	42	
12	Hull City	42	14	10	18	49	53	0.925	38	
13	Luton Town	42	10	18	14	43	48	0.896	38	
14	Sheffield Wednesday	42	13	12	17	51	58	0.879	38	
15	Oxford United	42	12	14	16	43	55	0.782	38	
16	Portsmouth	42	12	13	17	59	68	0.868	37	
17	Orient	42	14	9	19	50	61	0.820	37	
18	Preston North End	42	12	12	18	52	58	0.897	36	
19	Cardiff City	42	10	14	18	56	69	0.812	34	
20	Fulham	42	12	10	20	45	68	0.662	34	
21	Charlton Athletic (R)	42	12	9	21	55	77	0.714	33	Relegation to the Third Division
22	Watford (R)	42	5	9	28	24	75	0.320	19	Relegation to the Third Division

Rules for classification: 1) Points; 2) Goal average; 3) Goals scored
(C) Champions; (P) Promoted; (R) Relegated

=== Third Division ===
Aston Villa ended their two-year spell in the Third Division by gaining promotion as champions, and by the end of the decade would be firmly re-established as a First Division club. Brighton & Hove Albion followed Villa into the Second Division. Mansfield Town, Barnsley, Torquay United and Bradford City were relegated.

Pos	Team	Pld	W	D	L	GF	GA	GAv	Pts	Qualification or relegation
1	Aston Villa (C, P)	46	32	6	8	85	32	2.656	70	Promotion to the Second Division
2	Brighton & Hove Albion (P)	46	27	11	8	82	47	1.745	65	Promotion to the Second Division
3	Bournemouth	46	23	16	7	73	37	1.973	62	
4	Notts County	46	25	12	9	74	44	1.682	62	Qualification for the Watney Cup
5	Rotherham United	46	20	15	11	69	52	1.327	55	
6	Bristol Rovers	46	21	12	13	75	56	1.339	54	Qualification for the Watney Cup
7	Bolton Wanderers	46	17	16	13	51	41	1.244	50	
8	Plymouth Argyle	46	20	10	16	74	64	1.156	50	
9	Walsall	46	15	18	13	62	57	1.088	48	
10	Blackburn Rovers	46	19	9	18	54	57	0.947	47	
11	Oldham Athletic	46	17	11	18	59	63	0.937	45	
12	Shrewsbury Town	46	17	10	19	73	65	1.123	44	
13	Chesterfield	46	18	8	20	57	57	1.000	44	
14	Swansea City	46	17	10	19	46	59	0.780	44	
15	Port Vale	46	13	15	18	43	59	0.729	41	
16	Wrexham	46	16	8	22	59	63	0.937	40	Qualification for the Cup Winners' Cup first round
17	Halifax Town	46	13	12	21	48	61	0.787	38	
18	Rochdale	46	12	13	21	57	83	0.687	37	
19	York City	46	12	12	22	57	66	0.864	36	
20	Tranmere Rovers	46	10	16	20	50	71	0.704	36	
21	Mansfield Town (R)	46	8	20	18	41	63	0.651	36	Relegation to the Fourth Division
22	Barnsley (R)	46	9	18	19	32	64	0.500	36	Relegation to the Fourth Division
23	Torquay United (R)	46	10	12	24	41	69	0.594	32	Relegation to the Fourth Division
24	Bradford City (R)	46	11	10	25	45	77	0.584	32	Relegation to the Fourth Division

Rules for classification: 1) Points; 2) Goal average; 3) Goals scored
(C) Champions; (P) Promoted; (R) Relegated

=== Fourth Division ===
Grimsby Town, Southend United, Brentford and Scunthorpe United were promoted from the Fourth Division. Barrow were voted out of the Football League and replaced by Hereford United, who a short time earlier had achieved a shock FA Cup victory over Newcastle United.

Ernie Tagg sacked himself as manager of Crewe Alexandra because he felt that a younger manager should take charge of the club.

Pos	Team	Pld	W	D	L	GF	GA	GAv	Pts	Promotion or relegation
1	Grimsby Town (C, P)	46	28	7	11	88	56	1.571	63	Promotion to the Third Division
2	Southend United (P)	46	24	12	10	81	55	1.473	60	Promotion to the Third Division
3	Brentford (P)	46	24	11	11	76	44	1.727	59	Promotion to the Third Division
4	Scunthorpe United (P)	46	22	13	11	56	37	1.514	57	Promotion to the Third Division
5	Lincoln City	46	21	14	11	77	59	1.305	56	Qualified for the Watney Cup (Note: The two teams who scored the most goals in each division, and did not qualify for Europe and were not promoted, qualified for the Watney Cup.)
6	Workington	46	16	19	11	50	34	1.471	51	
7	Southport	46	18	14	14	66	46	1.435	50	
8	Peterborough United	46	17	16	13	82	64	1.281	50	Qualified for the Watney Cup
9	Bury	46	19	12	15	73	59	1.237	50	
10	Cambridge United	46	17	14	15	62	60	1.033	48	
11	Colchester United	46	19	10	17	70	69	1.014	48	
12	Doncaster Rovers	46	16	14	16	56	63	0.889	46	
13	Gillingham	46	16	13	17	61	67	0.910	45	
14	Newport County	46	18	8	20	60	72	0.833	44	
15	Exeter City	46	16	11	19	61	68	0.897	43	
16	Reading	46	17	8	21	56	76	0.737	42	
17	Aldershot	46	9	22	15	48	54	0.889	40	
18	Hartlepool	46	17	6	23	58	69	0.841	40	
19	Darlington	46	14	11	21	64	82	0.780	39	
20	Chester	46	10	18	18	47	56	0.839	38	
21	Northampton Town	46	12	13	21	66	79	0.835	37	Re-elected
22	Barrow (R)	46	13	11	22	40	71	0.563	37	Failed re-election and demoted to the Northern Premier League
23	Stockport County	46	9	14	23	55	87	0.632	32	Re-elected
24	Crewe Alexandra	46	10	9	27	43	69	0.623	29	Re-elected

Source: rsssf.com
(C) Champions; (P) Promoted; (R) Relegated

=== Top goalscorers ===
First Division

- Francis Lee (Manchester City) – 33 goals

Second Division

- Bob Latchford (Birmingham City) – 23 goals

Third Division

- Ted MacDougall (AFC Bournemouth) – 35 goals

Fourth Division

- Peter Price (Peterborough United) – 28 goals

== European competitions ==
The 1972 UEFA Cup Final was the final of the first ever UEFA Cup and was contested by two English teams, Wolverhampton Wanderers and Tottenham Hotspur. Spurs won 2–1 in the first leg at the Molineux on 3 May. The second leg, played on 17 May at White Hart Lane, ended 1–1. The 3–2 aggregate win by Tottenham Hotspur gave them the second European trophy in their history

== Diary of the season ==
8 July 1971: Bill Shankly signs a three-year contract as Liverpool manager which will keep him in charge until the end of the 1973–74 season.

7 August 1971: The 1971 FA Charity Shield is held, but without reigning League and Cup winners Arsenal, who are on a pre-season tour abroad. The Shield was won by Second Division champions Leicester City, who beat 1971 FA Cup Final runners-up Liverpool with a Steve Whitworth goal; Arsenal were beaten 1–0 by Feyenoord.

20 August 1971: Manchester United beat Arsenal 3–1 in a "home" tie, played at Anfield in Liverpool as a result of a ban from hosting their first two home games in Manchester, the second would be held at the Victoria Ground in Stoke-on-Trent.

13 October 1971: England earn a vital European Championship qualifying win in Switzerland. Anton Weibel scores a late own goal as England win 3–2 in Basel to go top of Group 3.

6 November 1971: The Manchester derby at Maine Road ends in a 3–3 thriller, with debutant 17-year-old winger Sammy McIlroy on the scoresheet for United.

10 November 1971: England draw 1–1 with Switzerland at Wembley to leave them in pole position to qualify for the European Championship quarter finals. Mike Summerbee scores early, with Karl Odermatt equalizing for the Swiss.

27 November 1971: Alan Woodward scores four of the seven Sheffield United put past Ipswich Town without reply, while elsewhere, George Best is the hat-trick hero as Manchester United beat Southampton 5–2, and Wolverhampton Wanderers beat West Bromwich Albion 3–2 in the Black Country derby.

1 December 1971: England win their European Championship qualifying group with a 2–0 win in Greece. Geoff Hurst and Martin Peters score the goals.

31 December 1971: At the end of the year, Manchester United are top of the First Division, three points ahead of Manchester City and four ahead of Leeds United. West Bromwich Albion and Nottingham Forest occupy the relegation places.

19 February 1972: Leeds United thrash Manchester United 5–1 at Elland Road and are two points behind Manchester City at the top of the table. Manchester United have now lost six League matches in a row.

23 February 1972: Second division Sheffield Wednesday host touring Brazilians Santos at Hillsborough stadium in a match played on a weekday afternoon due to the miners' strike. 37,000 spectators witness a 2–0 win for the Brazilian side who have Pelé in their line-up.

4 March 1972: Leeds United beat Southampton 7–0 and will overtake Manchester City at the top of the table if they win their two games in hand. Manchester United are beaten for the seventh consecutive match in the League when they lose 2–0 to Tottenham Hotspur.

6, 7 Match 1972: Derby County manager Brian Clough announces the signing of Nottingham Forest striker Ian Storey-Moore; this is disputed by the selling club and the player is in fact sold to Manchester United for £200,000.

8 March 1972: Rodney Marsh moves from Queens Park Rangers to Manchester City for £200,000.

31 March 1972: Brian Clough dismisses reports that he is to be Noel Cantwell's successor as Coventry City manager. Meanwhile, on the pitch, in the First Division, Leeds' failure to beat West Ham sees them miss the opportunity to top the table, victory for Millwall allows them to ascend to the summit of the Second Division ahead of Norwich City and Birmingham City, Third Division table-toppers Aston Villa pull away from AFC Bournemouth, and Grimsby Town move into second in the bottom tier (behind rivals Scunthorpe United) with a win over Reading, becoming the first League side to score 50 this season.

1 April 1972: Derby County beat Leeds United 2–0 and take over at the top of the First Division.

26 April 1972: Derby County win the Texaco Cup by beating Airdrieonians 2–1 on aggregate. Crystal Palace's 2–0 win over Stoke City relegates both Nottingham Forest and Huddersfield Town from the First Division.

1 May 1972: Derby County, in their last League game of the season, beat Liverpool 1–0. Leeds United beat Chelsea 2–0 and will win the title if they can beat Wolverhampton Wanderers in their final fixture.

8 May 1972: Derby County win the League Championship as neither Leeds United nor Liverpool manage to win their final league games. Leeds would have overtaken Derby on goal average had they drawn with Wolverhampton Wanderers at Molineux, but lose 2–1, while Liverpool draw 0–0 with Arsenal at Highbury.

11 May 1972: The First Division season ends when Tottenham Hotspur beat Arsenal 2–0 in the North London derby at Highbury.

== Star players ==
- Gordon Banks was voted FWA Footballer of the Year to add to his League Cup winners medal.
- Norman Hunter and Billy Bremner helped Leeds win the FA Cup.
- Roy McFarland and Colin Todd helped Derby win the League Championship.

== Star managers ==
- Brian Clough guided Derby to their first league championship triumph.
- Don Revie helped Leeds lift the FA Cup for the first time.
- Tony Waddington ended Stoke City's trophyless history by winning the League Cup.

== National team ==
England were eliminated from the 1972 European Championships in the quarter-finals after losing 3–1 on aggregate over two legs (1–3 at Wembley and 0–0 in West Berlin) to West Germany, who went on to win the tournament.
