= Pat Kruse =

English footballer

Personal information
- Full name: Patrick Karl Kruse
- Date of birth: 30 November 1953 (age 72)
- Place of birth: Arlesey, England
- Position: Centre back

Senior career*
Years	Team	Apps	(Gls)
–1970	Arlesey Town		
1970–1975	Leicester City	2	(0)
1974	→ Mansfield Town (loan)	6	(1)
1975	→ Torquay United (loan)	10	(0)
1975–1977	Torquay United	69	(4)
1977–1982	Brentford	186	(12)
1982	→ Northampton Town (loan)	18	(0)
1982–1983	Barnet	28	(1)
Total		291	(17)
- * Club domestic league appearances and goals

Patrick Karl Kruse (born 30 November 1953) is an English former professional footballer who is best remembered for his five-year spell in the Football League with Brentford, for whom he made over 200 appearances as a centre back. Kruse is known for scoring what is believed to be the fastest own goal of all time, netting past his own keeper after just eight seconds of play in a match in January 1977.

== Career ==
=== Arlesey Town ===
A centre back, Kruse began his career at hometown South Midlands League Premier Division club Arlesey Town. He departed in June 1970.

=== Leicester City ===
Kruse secured a move to the top tier of English football in June 1970 when he signed for the club he supports, Leicester City. He had to wait over two years to make his professional debut for the Foxes, which came with a start in a 1–0 defeat to Tottenham Hotspur on 27 April 1974. Owing to Malcolm Munro's injury, he filled in again two days later versus Norwich City, this time helping Leicester to a clean sheet in a 3–0 win. Kruse failed to make another first team appearance for the Foxes and moved to Fourth Division club Mansfield Town on loan in September 1974. He departed Filbert Street at the end of the 1974–75 season.

=== Torquay United ===
Kruse linked up with former Leicester City assistant manager Malcolm Musgrove to sign for Fourth Division club Torquay United on loan in March 1975. He made 10 appearances during the remainder of the 1974–75 season and signed permanently at the end of the campaign. Kruse established himself in the team the following season and won the club's Player of the Year award. The most memorable event of Kruse's time with Torquay came in a match versus Cambridge United in January 1977, when he scored what is claimed to be the quickest own goal of all time, scoring after just six seconds of play:

The game was delayed for about an hour because of a frozen pitch, but when it got underway, Cambridge had kick-off and punted it forward. I was playing centre-half and could see their winger and centre-forward running towards me. The easy thing would have been to head the ball straight back out again but, at the last second, I thought I'd flick it back to my goalkeeper and we'd have possession. Unbeknown to me, I was standing just inside the box and Terry Lee, the goalkeeper, came off the line to come and catch it. Then he tried to shout for it, but he had a speech impediment and that's when his affliction kicked in – he stuttered, but nothing came out at all. As far as I knew, he was still in his goal, but when he realised I didn't hear, he tried to go back, slipped on the ice and as I flicked it back, I could see him lying on the floor as the ball went in. Unfortunately, it wasn't caught on camera!

Kruse departed Torquay United in March 1977, having made 79 league appearances and scored four goals during two years at Plainmoor.

=== Brentford ===
Kruse joined Fourth Division strugglers Brentford in March 1977, for what was then a club-record fee for a defender, £20,000. Opinions about the transfer were mixed, as he had been Brentford forward Gordon Sweetzer's marker in his final game for Torquay United, in which Sweetzer had scored a hat-trick. Kruse quickly established himself in the team and made 15 appearances and scoring two goals in what remained of the 1976–77 season He flourished under Bill Dodgin's management and became a stalwart in the Brentford defence for the next four seasons, assuming the captaincy and forming partnerships with other centre backs Paul Shrubb, Nigel Smith and Danis Salman. Kruse averaged 42 appearances a season and helped the club to promotion to the Third Division in the 1977–78 season. His performances during the 1979–80 season won him the club's Player of the Year award.

Kruse was out of favour under new manager Fred Callaghan during the 1981–82 season and made just one appearance before joining Fourth Division strugglers on loan Northampton Town in February 1982. Kruse rejected a potential permanent transfer to the County Ground due to wage concerns. He left Brentford at the end of the season, after making 201 appearances and scored 12 goals in just over five years at Griffin Park.

=== Barnet ===
Kruse dropped into non-League football to sign for Alliance Premier League club Barnet in 1982. He made 31 appearances and scored one goal before retiring at the end of the 1982–83 season. Differences with manager Barry Fry saw Kruse turn his back on the game at age 29.

== Personal life ==
During his time at Brentford, Kruse commuted to the town from his Midlands home with David McKellar and picked up Jim McNichol and Bob Booker on the way. After retiring from football, Kruse settled in Hitchin and became a builder. He retired in 2022.

== Career statistics ==
Appearances and goals by club, season and competition
Club	Season	League			FA Cup		League Cup		Other		Total	
Club	Season	Division	Apps	Goals	Apps	Goals	Apps	Goals	Apps	Goals	Apps	Goals
Leicester City	1973–74	First Division	2	0	0	0	0	0	—		2	0
Torquay United (loan)	1974–75	Fourth Division	10	0	—		—		—		10	0
Brentford	1976–77	Fourth Division	15	2	—		—		—		15	2
Brentford	1977–78	Fourth Division	40	1	2	0	2	0	—		44	1
Brentford	1978–79	Third Division	44	4	1	0	2	0	—		47	4
Brentford	1979–80	Third Division	44	3	1	0	2	0	—		47	3
Brentford	1980–81	Third Division	42	2	3	0	2	0	—		47	2
Brentford	1981–82	Third Division	1	0	0	0	0	0	—		1	0
Brentford	Total		186	12	7	0	8	0	—		201	12
Northampton Town (loan)	1981–82	Fourth Division	18	0	—		—		—		18	0
Barnet	1982–83	Alliance Premier League	28	1	1	0	—		2 (Note: Appearances in FA Trophy)	0	31	1
Career total			244	13	8	0	8	0	2	0	262	13

== Honours ==
Brentford

- Football League Fourth Division fourth-place promotion: 1977–78

Individual

- Torquay United Player of the Year: 1975–76
- Brentford Supporters' Player of the Year: 1979–80
- Brentford Players' Player of the Year: 1979–80
