= Bobby Kellard =

English footballer (1943–2021)

Personal information
- Full name: Robert Sydney William Kellard
- Date of birth: 1 March 1943
- Place of birth: Edmonton, England
- Date of death: 10 January 2021 (aged 77)
- Place of death: Essex, England
- Position: Midfielder

Youth career
- Southend United

Senior career*
Years	Team	Apps	(Gls)
1959–1963	Southend United	106	(15)
1963–1965	Crystal Palace	77	(6)
1965–1966	Ipswich Town	13	(3)
1966–1968	Portsmouth	91	(8)
1968–1970	Bristol City	77	(6)
1970–1971	Leicester City	48	(8)
1971–1972	Crystal Palace	46	(4)
1972–1975	Portsmouth	63	(6)
1974	→ Hereford United (loan)	3	(1)
1975	Cape Town City	?	(?)
1975–1976	Torquay United	2	(0)
1976–1977	Chelmsford City	?	(?)
?	Grays Athletic	?	(?)

International career
?	England youth	?	(?)

Managerial career
- 1976–1977: Chelmsford City (player manager)
- 1994–1995: Harlow Town (joint with Len Glover)
- * Club domestic league appearances and goals

Robert Sydney William Kellard (1 March 1943 – 10 January 2021) was an English professional footballer. He represented England at youth level.

== Early league career ==
Kellard, a much-travelled midfielder, began his career as a junior with Southend United and became Southend's youngest ever league player (at the age of 16 years and 212 days) in September 1959 when he started the game at Bradford City. He turned professional in May 1960 and went on to score 15 times in 106 games for the Shrimpers before earning a £9,000 move to Crystal Palace in September 1963. After 6 goals in 77 games he moved to Ipswich Town, but played only 13 times before moving to Portsmouth in March 1966.

== Mid career ==
In July 1968, after 91 games for Portsmouth in which he scored eight times, he moved to Bristol City for a fee of £30,000, where he scored six times in 77 games before moving to Leicester City, in August 1970, for a fee of £50,000. He helped Leicester to promotion in 1971 and helped them win the 1971 FA Charity Shield, but left in September 1971 to rejoin Crystal Palace, for a fee of £50,000, having scored eight goals in 49 games for the Foxes. He was signed by Palace as a replacement for Steve Kember who they had sold to Chelsea for £170,000, and he fitted in so well that by November he had been made captain. However, on 29 December 1972, Kellard moved on to Portsmouth having made 46 appearances in his second spell at Palace, scoring 4 times.

== Later career ==
In December 1972 he moved back to Portsmouth, having scored four times in 46 games for Palace. At Portsmouth he gained the unwanted honour of being the first player sent off on a Sunday when he was dismissed against Orient in January 1974. The following January he joined Hereford United on loan, and later in 1975 left to play in South Africa for Durban City F.C., having scored six times in 62 games for Pompey. He moved to Cape Town City, but returned to England in September 1975, joining Torquay United, but played only twice for Malcolm Musgrove's side, the first being a 7–1 defeat away to Tranmere Rovers and the last against Hartlepool United, before leaving league football to join Chelmsford City.

== After league career finished ==
In January 1976 he was appointed player-manager of Chelmsford City, a position he held until May 1977. He later played for Grays Athletic.

He later spent several years running a taxi business in Southend, but in 1999 was trading as an antiques dealer. More recently he had a spell as joint-manager of Harlow Town along with former Leicester City player Len Glover.

In July 2004, the Evening Echo reported that Kellard was living in Spain.

Kellard had a stroke in February 2020. He died on 10 January 2021, aged 77.

Sporting positions
Preceded by Dave Edwards	Harlow Town Manager (with Len Glover); 1994–1995	Succeeded by Dave Green
