= Rodney Fern =

English footballer

Personal information
- Full name: Rodney Alan Fern
- Date of birth: 13 December 1948
- Place of birth: Burton upon Trent, England
- Date of death: 16 January 2018 (aged 69)
- Position: Striker

Youth career
- Measham Imps

Senior career*
Years	Team	Apps	(Gls)
1967–1972	Leicester City	152	(32)
1972–1975	Luton Town	39	(5)
1975–1979	Chesterfield	152	(54)
1979–1983	Rotherham United	105	(34)
Total		448	(125)
- * Club domestic league appearances and goals

Rodney Alan Fern (13 December 1948 – 16 January 2018) was an English professional footballer who played as a striker.

== Career ==
Born in Burton upon Trent, Fern played as an amateur for Measham Imps before turning professional in 1967 with Leicester City. He also played for Luton Town, Chesterfield and Rotherham United before retiring in 1983. He was part of the Leicester side that won the 1971 FA Charity Shield.

Fern died on 16 January 2018, after suffering from dementia.

== Honours ==
Leicester City

- FA Cup runner-up: 1968–69

Rotherham United

- Football League Third Division: 1980–81
