= John Sjoberg =

Scottish footballer (1941–2008)

Personal information
- Full name: John Sjoberg
- Date of birth: 12 June 1941
- Place of birth: Aberdeen, Scotland
- Date of death: 2 October 2008 (aged 67)
- Place of death: Leicester, England
- Position: Full-back

Youth career
- Banks O' Dee

Senior career*
Years	Team	Apps	(Gls)
1958–1973	Leicester City	336	(15)
1973	Rotherham United	6	(0)
- * Club domestic league appearances and goals

John Sjoberg (12 June 1941 – 2 October 2008) was a Scottish footballer who played 15 seasons for Leicester City between 1958 and 1973. Sjoberg joined the Foxes from Scottish amateur side Banks O' Dee in August 1958 and went on to play 413 first-team matches for Leicester. He played mostly as a full-back but transitioned to centre-half towards the end of his career.

== Career ==
Sjoberg made his debut for Leicester in a 2–1 victory at Cardiff City in October 1960. He was an almost ever-present in the great Ice Kings side of 1962/63, including playing in the final at Wembley, where City lost 3–1 to Manchester United, and the following season he was a member of the Leicester side that won the League Cup, securing the Foxes their first major trophy. He also helped them win the 1971 FA Charity Shield.

Sjoberg left Leicester City in 1973 and played briefly for Rotherham United before retiring to open his own printing business in Leicester. He died in October 2008 at the age of 67 following a short illness.

== Honours ==
Leicester City

- Football League Cup: 1963–64; runner-up: 1964–65
- FA Cup runner-up: 1962–63
