= 1971 FA Charity Shield =

| Leicester City | Liverpool |
| 1 | 0 |
- Date: 7 August 1971
- Venue: Filbert Street, Leicester
- Referee: Pat Partridge
- Attendance: 25,104
- Weather: Sunny

The 1971 FA Charity Shield was a football match between Leicester City and Liverpool at Filbert Street on Saturday 7 August 1971.

Arsenal won the double in 1970–71 but were unable to take part in the Charity Shield because they had contracted to go on a pre-season tour that clashed with the fixture. The 1971 FA Cup Final runners-up Liverpool and Second Division winners Leicester City were invited to take part instead.

Leicester won the game with a goal from Steve Whitworth, when he tapped the ball in at the near post after initially crossing the ball into the box.

== Match details ==
7 August 1971

| Leicester City | 1–0 | Liverpool |
|---|---|---|
| Whitworth 15' | Report |

Filbert Street, Leicester
Attendance: 25,104

| Leicester City | Liverpool |

| GK | 1 | (England) Peter Shilton |
| RB | 2 | (England) Steve Whitworth |
| LB | 3 | (England) David Nish |
| CM | 4 | (England) Bobby Kellard |
| CB | 5 | (Scotland) John Sjoberg |
| CB | 6 | (England) Graham Cross | (c) |
| RW | 7 | (England) John Farrington |
| CF | 8 | (Scotland) Ali Brown |
| CF | 9 | (England) Rodney Fern |
| CM | 10 | (England) Jon Sammels |
| LW | 11 | (England) Len Glover |
Substitutes:
| CB | 12 | (Scotland) Malcolm Manley |
Manager:
(England) Jimmy Bloomfield

| GK | 1 | (England) Ray Clemence |
| RB | 2 | (England) Chris Lawler |
| LB | 3 | (England) Alec Lindsay |
| CB | 4 | (England) Tommy Smith (c) |
| CB | 5 | (England) Larry Lloyd |
| CB | 6 | (England) Emlyn Hughes |
| RM | 7 | (England) Ian Callaghan |
| CF | 8 | (England) Alun Evans |
| LM | 9 | (Republic of Ireland) Steve Heighway |
| CF | 10 | (Scotland) Bobby Graham |
| CF | 11 | (Scotland) Brian Hall |
Substitutes:
| CF | 12 | (Wales) John Toshak |
| MF | 13 | (England) Peter Thompson |
Manager:
(Scotland) Bill Shankly

== See also ==
- 1970–71 Football League
- 1970–71 FA Cup
