= Steve Sims (footballer) =

English footballer

Personal information
- Date of birth: 2 July 1957 (age 69)
- Place of birth: Lincoln, England
- Height: 6 ft 1 in (1.85 m)
- Position: Central defender

Senior career*
Years	Team	Apps	(Gls)
1975–1978	Leicester City	79	(3)
1978–1984	Watford	152	(4)
1984–1986	Notts County	85	(5)
1986–1987	Watford	19	(1)
1987–1989	Aston Villa	41	(0)
1989–??	Burton Albion	?	(?)

International career
1976–1978	England U21	10	(2)
- * Club domestic league appearances and goals

Steve Sims (born 2 July 1957) is an English former football defender. He played about half of his professional career at Watford.

Sims started his career at Leicester City in 1975. After 3 seasons, he was transferred to Watford for £175,000 and was the player of the season for 1980/81. In 1984, he moved to Notts County and after 2 years with the club he returned to Watford for his second spell. After a single season he signed for Aston Villa and then played for Burton Albion.

Sims remained in the West Midlands after his time at Aston Villa and retired from working for Asda in Minworth in June 2023.
