= Brian Alderson (footballer) =

Scottish footballer (1950–1997)

Personal information
- Full name: Brian Roderick Alderson
- Date of birth: 5 May 1950
- Place of birth: Dundee, Scotland
- Date of death: 23 April 1997 (aged 46)
- Place of death: Atlanta, United States
- Height: 5 ft 7 in (1.70 m)
- Positions: Winger; striker

Youth career
- Lochee Harp

Senior career*
| Years | Team | Apps | (Gls) |
| 1970–1975 | Coventry City | 127 | (29) |
| 1975–1978 | Leicester City | 90 | (9) |
| 1978–1979 | New England Tea Men | 47 | (7) |
| 1979–1980 | New England Tea Men (indoor) | 9 | (7) |
| 1980–1981 | Atlanta Chiefs | 62 | (7) |
| 1980–1981 | Atlanta Chiefs (indoor) | 16 | (15) |
| 1981–1982 | New Jersey Rockets (indoor) | 32 | (7) |

International career
| 1973 | Scotland U23 | 1 | (0) |
- * Club domestic league appearances and goals

Brian Alderson (5 May 1950 –23 April 1997) was a Scottish footballer. He predominantly played as a winger but was also able to play as a striker.

Alderson, who was born in Dundee, began his career with the local youth side Lochee Harp before becoming a professional with Coventry City. He made his league debut against Chelsea on 20 September 1970. Alderson spent five years at Highfield Road, twice finishing as Coventry's top goalscorer, before moving to Leicester City in mid-1975. He spent three years with Leicester, although he was no longer a regular during his final season, 1977–78, owing to injury.

In 1978, Noel Cantwell, who had managed Alderson during his spell at Coventry, invited him to play for the newly formed New England Tea Men of the North American Soccer League. Alderson spent two years at the club before concluding his outdoor career with a two-year spell at the Atlanta Chiefs. He ended his career playing indoor football for the New Jersey Rockets.
