= Joe Jopling =

English footballer

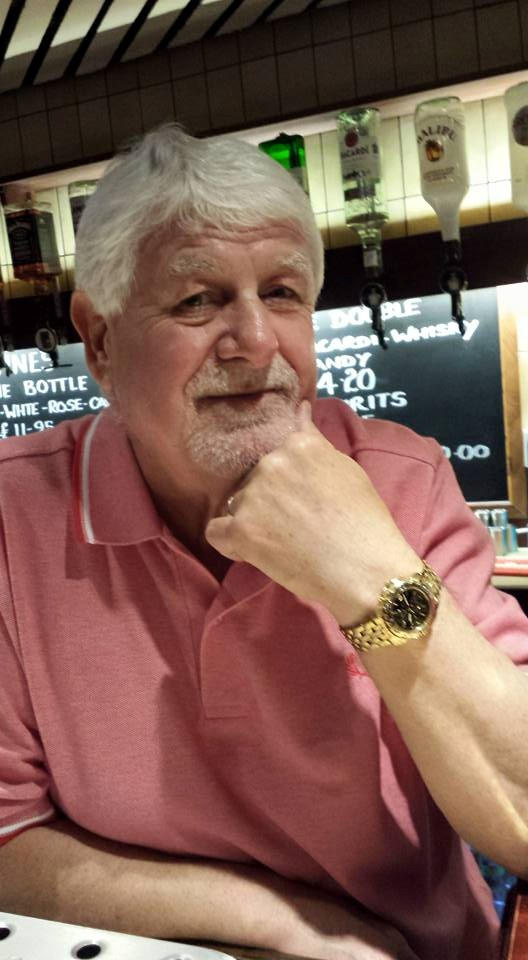
- Joe Jopling in 2015

Personal information
- Date of birth: 21 April 1951 (age 75)
- Place of birth: South Shields, England
- Height: 6 ft 0 in (1.83 m)
- Position: Central defender

Senior career*
Years	Team	Apps	(Gls)
1969–1970	Aldershot	35	(2)
1970–1974	Leicester City	3	(0)
1973–1974	→ Torquay United (loan)	6	(0)
1974–1984	Aldershot	332	(11)
Total		376	(13)
- * Club domestic league appearances and goals

Joe Jopling (born 21 April 1951) is an English former footballer. He played 367 league games for Aldershot in two spells between 1969 and 1970, and from 1974 to 1984.

== Playing career ==
Jopling worked on South Shields shipyards, playing football at a junior level for Harton and Westoe F.C. in Tyneside, before he signed professional contracts with Aldershot in August 1969. He was an immediate hit with the Fourth Division club, helping the Shots to reach the Fourth Round of the FA Cup in 1969–70.

In September 1970, Second Division Leicester City signed the player, in a deal which saw Murray Brodie and Jimmy Burt moving to Aldershot plus a reported fee of £30,000. Jopling made just three league appearances in four seasons while at Leicester.

He had a short loan spell at Torquay United, before returning to Aldershot in March 1974. Appointed as captain at the club, he spent the next ten years with the club before his retirement in May 1984.

He is still living in the Aldershot area, and was former landlord of the Golden Lion public house on the High Street. He is a frequent guest to the new Aldershot Town club, who were formed in 1992 in the aftermath of the original side going out of business.
