= Mike Stringfellow =

English footballer

Personal information
- Full name: Michael David Stringfellow
- Date of birth: 27 January 1943 (age 83)
- Place of birth: Kirkby-in-Ashfield, England
- Position: Winger

Senior career*
Years	Team	Apps	(Gls)
1960–1962	Mansfield Town	57	(10)
1962–1975	Leicester City	315	(82)
1975–1976	Nuneaton Borough	5	(1)
Total		377	(93)
- * Club domestic league appearances and goals

Michael David Stringfellow (born 27 January 1943 in Kirkby-in-Ashfield, Nottinghamshire) is an English retired footballer who played 14 seasons as a winger for Leicester City in the 1960s and 1970s. He is the uncle of fellow footballer Ian Stringfellow.

Stringfellow began his career at Mansfield Town whom he joined as a schoolboy in 1957. He was a star in Mansfield's youth team, and signed a professional contract in February 1960, shortly after his 17th birthday. He made his first-team debut six months later, playing as an outside-left in the game against Rochdale on 30 August 1960.

Despite his young age, Stringfellow remained a regular in the Mansfield Town side, and scored 12 goals in 65 appearances for the Stags, before moving to Leicester City for £25,000 in January 1962 – the highest transfer fee ever paid for an 18-year-old at the time.

By his second season at Filbert Street, Stringfellow was a regular in the Leicester side. He was a member of the Leicester side that lost against Manchester United in the 1963 FA Cup Final, and scored one of the goals when the Foxes won the League Cup the following season with a 4–3 aggregate win against Stoke City.

In 1968, Stringfellow's career was curtailed by a serious cartilage injury. Nevertheless, he remained on Leicester's books, mostly in a reserve role, until 1975 when he quit the professional game and finished his career with non-league Nuneaton Borough. In all competitions, Stringfellow played 377 games for Leicester and scored 98 goals.

After his retirement from football, Stringfellow settled in Enderby, Leicestershire, where he worked as a newsagent.

== Honours ==
Leicester City

- Football League Cup: 1963–64; runner-up: 1964–65
- FA Cup runner-up: 1962–63
