= Malcolm Manley =

Scottish footballer

Personal information
- Full name: Malcolm Richardson Manley
- Date of birth: 1 December 1949
- Place of birth: Johnstone, Scotland
- Date of death: 16 August 2020 (aged 70)
- Position: Centre back

Youth career
- 1964–1966: Johnstone Burgh

Senior career*
Years	Team	Apps	(Gls)
1966–1973	Leicester	120	(5)
1973–1974	Portsmouth	11	(0)
1977	South Melbourne	2	(0)

International career
1964	Scotland Schoolboys	3	
- * Club domestic league appearances and goals

Malcolm Manley (1 December 1949 – 16 August 2020), was a footballer.

Manley gained Schoolboy international honours for Scotland before joining his hometown club Johnstone Burgh. Here he quickly caught the eye of scouts south of the border and he signed for Leicester City F.C. in January 1967. The highlights of his time at Filbert Street included being substitute in the 1969 FA Cup final side and a 1971 Second division Championship winners Medal. He also played as a substitute when Leicester won the 1971 FA Charity Shield. In December 1973, Manley signed for Portsmouth with funds made available by ambitious new chairman John Deacon. Manager John Mortimore planned a rock-like central partnership between the Scotsman and fellow new signing Paul Went which briefly materialised before he severed a cartilage in only his 11th game for the Fratton Park club, never to play professionally again.

== Death ==
Manley died on 16 August 2020, aged 70.

== Honours ==
Leicester City

- FA Cup runner-up: 1968–69
