= Lenny Glover =

English footballer (born 1944)

Personal information
- Full name: Leonard Glover
- Date of birth: 31 January 1944 (age 82)
- Place of birth: Kennington, London, England
- Height: 5 ft 9 in (1.75 m)
- Position: Winger

Senior career*
Years	Team	Apps	(Gls)
1962–1968	Charlton Athletic	177	(20)
1968–1976	Leicester City	252	(38)
1976–1978	Kettering Town		
1976–1978	→ Tampa Bay Rowdies (loan)	32	(1)
1979	Shepshed Charterhouse		
1994	Harlow Town		

Managerial career
- 1977: Tampa Bay Rowdies (caretaker)
- 1994: Harlow Town
- * Club domestic league appearances and goals

Leonard Glover (born 31 January 1944) is a retired footballer who played as a winger for Charlton Athletic and Leicester City. Considered one of the greatest players to don a Leicester City shirt and once described as the "best uncapped winger in the world", the acerbic and quick-witted Cockney is often referred to in Frank Worthington's seminal "One Hump or Two": for example, when locally born defender Alan Woollett's dog died manager Jimmy Bloomfield tried to get his players to show respectful sympathy towards the defender — a feat Glover was singularly unable to do. While at Leicester he helped them win the 1971 FA Charity Shield. Later, he had a spell at Kettering Town, and a spell as joint manager of Harlow Town with Bobby Kellard, and since the 2006 World Cup a hard hitting blog.

Glover was the captain of the Tampa Bay Rowdies during the 1977 NASL season. He served as the Rowdies' caretaker manager for one game in June 1977 after Eddie Firmani abruptly resigned, and before John Boyle was hired on to finish the season.

== Honours ==
Leicester City

- FA Cup runner-up: 1968–69
