= Malcolm Partridge =

English footballer

Personal information
- Date of birth: 28 August 1950 (age 76)
- Place of birth: Calow, England
- Position: Forward

Senior career*
| Years | Team | Apps | (Gls) |
| 1967–1971 | Mansfield Town | 67 | (20) |
| 1971–1974 | Leicester City | 36 | (4) |
| 1971–1972 | → Charlton Athletic (loan) | 2 | (0) |
| 1974–1979 | Grimsby Town | 138 | (25) |
| 1979–1982 | Scunthorpe United | 97 | (21) |
| Total | | 340 | (70) |
- * Club domestic league appearances and goals

Malcolm Partridge (born 28 August 1950 in Calow, Derbyshire, England), is an English footballer who played as a forward in the Football League.

== Personal life ==
Partridge's son, Scott, was also a professional footballer.
