= Steve Kember =

English footballer and manager

Personal information
- Full name: Stephen Dennis Kember
- Date of birth: 8 December 1948 (age 77)
- Place of birth: Croydon, England
- Position: Midfielder

Team information
- Current team: Crystal Palace (chief scout)

Youth career
- 1963–1965: Crystal Palace

Senior career*
Years	Team	Apps	(Gls)
1965–1971	Crystal Palace	218	(34)
1971–1975	Chelsea	130	(13)
1975–1978	Leicester City	117	(6)
1978–1980	Crystal Palace	42	(1)
1980–1981	Vancouver Whitecaps	22	(2)

International career
1967	England Youth	7	(0)
1970–1972	England U23	3	(0)

Managerial career
- 1981–1983: Crystal Palace
- 1986–1993: Whyteleafe
- 2001: Crystal Palace (caretaker)
- 2001: Crystal Palace (caretaker) (Note: Caretaker with Terry Bullivant)
- 2003: Crystal Palace
- * Club domestic league appearances and goals

Stephen Dennis Kember (born 8 December 1948) is an English former footballer who played in the centre of midfield during his career, before going into management. He has a long affiliation with Crystal Palace, where he is currently the chief scout.

== Playing career ==
In 1963, Kember joined Crystal Palace, as an apprentice, and in 1965, on his 17th birthday, he was rewarded with a professional contract.

By the end of the decade, he was a regular in the Palace midfield, and became a fans' favourite by scoring the winning goal in the home tie with Fulham, in 1969, that secured promotion to the First Division for the first time in the club's history. That season, Kember was one of only three players who played in every game.

In the top flight, Kember continued to impress, gaining England U23 caps, and in the summer of 1971, having helped Palace to survival, he replaced John Sewell as captain, following Sewell's departure to Orient.

However, the captaincy was short-lived, and Kember joined Chelsea for a record fee of £170,000 in September.

At Chelsea, Kember quickly stamped his authority on a place in the starting line-up, playing most of the West-London club's games, that season.

However, Chelsea then fell into decline, and were eventually relegated to the Second Division, at the end of the 1974–75 season. Relegation led to a sell-off of players, and Kember moved back to the top-flight with Leicester City.

At first, he was a regular in Leicester's first team line up, but after two seasons, he was little more than a squad player, only appearing in half of Leicester's games in the 1977–78 season.

Early in the 1978–79 season, Terry Venables signed him back to Crystal Palace. While Kember had been away, the south London club's fortunes had taken a dramatic turn for the worse, being relegated to the Second Division in 1973, and again, to the Third, the following year. They had been promoted in the 1976–77 season, but were still a long way behind where they were when Kember left.

Venables' signing of Kember was intended to be as a squad player, but his experience added so much to the side that he quickly became a regular in the first XI. So much so that Palace were promoted back to the First Division, at the end of the season.

Venables then decided that Kember was not good enough for the First Division, so he moved on again, this time to Canadian side, the Vancouver Whitecaps.

He had a largely un-noteworthy couple of seasons in Canada, and in the summer of 1981 he returned to Palace again (who had a new chairman, Ron Noades), this time as a coach for the Youth setup.

== Managerial career ==
Noades quickly became tired of manager Dario Gradi, who had only been appointed in the summer. With the club facing successive relegations once again, Gradi was dismissed in November, and Kember got his first taste of management.

He had a relatively successful period, taking the club on an FA Cup run to the Sixth Round, and achieving Second Division survival with a game to spare.

However, for reasons unknown, he was replaced with the highly unpopular Alan Mullery. Kember said of the matter that he was "away on holiday at the time" and thus wasn't even notified of his dismissal.

He then joined non-league Whyteleafe in November 1986, as manager, helping them to the Third Qualifying Round of the FA Cup in the 1988–89 and 1989–90 seasons. In the former, "The Leafe" were also promoted, to the Isthmian League Division One.

In the summer of 1993, Kember resigned (to be replaced by former Palace teammate Paul Hinshelwood) and once again went back to Palace, as a member of the coaching staff.

He stayed in that role until April 2001, when, with Palace once again facing relegation to the third tier, manager Alan Smith was sacked by new chairman Simon Jordan, and Kember was made caretaker for the remaining two games of the season. Palace were six points short of survival, and it seemed unlikely that relegation could be avoided.

However, Kember made changes to the side, and after a last-gasp win at Stockport County, Palace survived.

In honour of this achievement, chairman Jordan said that Kember would now have a "job for life" at Palace.

However, this was not the managerial job just yet. Steve Bruce took over, and Kember was made his assistant.

Bruce's tenure only lasted a couple of months, and, after Kember was again made caretaker (this time with Terry Bullivant), Trevor Francis took over. Francis was unpopular with the fans in his 14 months with the club, and was eventually sacked in February 2003, with Kember again being made caretaker, this time alone.

At the end of the season, Kember was made manager full-time, and Palace's 2003–04 season got off to a flying start, the club winning all three of their opening games, to top the table. However by November, Palace were in 20th, and only two points above the drop-zone after losing 5–0 at newly promoted Wigan Athletic. Jordan saw this as the final straw, and Kember was sacked, clearly revoking Jordan's "job for life" pledge.

Kember coached at Cumnor House School in Purley, and later coached football and cricket at Whitgift School, South London, alongside scouting for Fulham initially, and then returning to Crystal Palace as Chief Scout after the departure of Jordan. Currently manages the Old Mid Whitgiftian Vets who won the Surrey Vets Cup season 2018–2019, his sons play in the team.

== Personal life ==
Kember has four sons, Matthew, Robbie, Paul and Steven. Robbie and Paul came through the Youth system at Palace, and went on into non-league football, while Matthew started out at Whyteleafe. Paul had trials with Middlesbrough while Robbie had spells with Woking, Basingstoke, Crawley, Lewes, Tonbridge Angels, Eastbourne Borough, Hampton and Richmond. In May 2009 Robbie moved to Bromley. Matthew and Paul are believed to be retired.

Steven ( is Paul, he had to change to Steven as there was already an actor called Paul Kember) played mischievous and cunning schoolboy Bryan Arthur Derek Boyes in the hit Children's BBC TV show Bad Boyes, first aired on BBC1 in the autumns of 1987 and 1988.

== Business career ==
In the early 1990s Kember owned a wine bar in his native Croydon called Kember's Wine Bar however the bar closed in 1993 after he was declared bankrupt.

Preceded by Unknown	Whyteleafe manager 1986–1993	Succeeded by Paul Hinshelwood
