= Dennis Rofe =

English footballer and manager

Personal information
- Date of birth: 1 June 1950 (age 76)
- Place of birth: Epping, England
- Height: 5 ft 7 in (1.70 m)
- Position: Full-back

Youth career
- 1964–1968: Leyton Orient

Senior career*
Years	Team	Apps	(Gls)
1968–1972	Leyton Orient	172	(6)
1972–1980	Leicester City	290	(5)
1980–1982	Chelsea	59	(0)
1982–1984	Southampton	20	(0)

International career
1973	England U23	1	(0)

Managerial career
- 1991–1992: Bristol Rovers
- 2012: AFC Bournemouth (caretaker)
- * Club domestic league appearances and goals

Dennis Rofe (born 1 June 1950) is an English former professional footballer and coach who played as a full-back.

He began his playing career at Leyton Orient before moving to Leicester City in 1972 where he would spend the majority of career. In 1982, Rofe joined Chelsea. After two years at the club, he moved to Southampton where he retired.

Rofe has had several coaching spells at Southampton. He was also a coach at Bristol Rovers where he would later become manager. Rofe has also had coaching spells at Stoke City, Fulham, Kingstonian and Bournemouth.

== Club career ==
=== Leyton Orient ===
He started his career at Leyton Orient after being spotted whilst playing for East London Boys U13's – originally joining Orient as an associate schoolboy in March 1964 before turning professional when he was 18 years-old.

He was a fast, tough-tackling left-back who starred in Orient's 1969–70 Third Division title triumph, missing only one game. He was ever-present in 1970–71. He netted six goals in 172 League appearances for Orient before following Jimmy Bloomfield to Leicester City for £112,000 in August 1972, which made him the most expensive full-back in British football at that time.

=== Leicester City ===
Rofe was signed by Bloomfield to fill the left back position after David Nish had been sold to Derby County for £250,000, which was a new record fee for a full-back that had been set by Rofe only 24 hours earlier. He made his England U23 debut whilst a Leicester player in 1973. Jock Wallace, who joined the club in June 1978, gave Rofe the captaincy following relegation to the Second Division. In his eight seasons at Leicester he played 290 league games for the club and scored six goals.

=== Chelsea and Southampton ===
He was sold to Second Division Chelsea, in February 1980, shortly before Leicester won promotion back to the First Division whilst Chelsea lost out on promotion on goal difference. Rofe then spent three seasons at Chelsea as they drifted in Division 2, including a period as team captain.

In July 1982, Lawrie McMenemy signed him on a free transfer for First Division Southampton, where he played out the last two years of his playing career.

== Coaching and management career ==
=== Southampton ===
In 1984, he joined Southampton's coaching staff under the manager Chris Nicholl, initially as the reserve team coach, moving up to first team coach in 1987 before departing the club in 1991.

=== Bristol Rovers ===
He joined Bristol Rovers as a coach in July 1991. Shortly after joining Rovers, he replaced Martin Dobson, firstly as caretaker manager, taking the position permanently in October 1991. Rovers finished the 1991–92 season in 13th position in Division 2. In November 1992, Rofe resigned.

=== Return to Southampton ===
He then moved briefly to Stoke City as the reserve team manager before returning to Southampton as the youth team coach. This position lasted until July 1997 when he moved on to Fulham as a coach, before a brief spell coaching for Kingstonian.

In April 1998, he returned to Southampton as coach of their academy, but soon moved up to reserve team coach and later to first team coach under Stuart Gray. He served as first team coach and assistant manager as Southampton had a rapid turnover of managers. His greatest moment as a Southampton coach was when Southampton reached the 2003 FA Cup final under Gordon Strachan, losing 1–0 to Arsenal.

As assistant manager at Southampton, he had a fiery reputation. On 10 January 2002, he had to be separated from the acting Liverpool manager Phil Thompson by the fourth official in a touchline argument over a bad tackle on Brett Ormerod. On 8 May 2004, Rofe was ordered from the technical area after protesting about the award of a penalty to Aston Villa. Following a brawl in which Andy Cole was given a red card on 25 October 2003, Blackburn Rovers manager Graeme Souness accused Rofe of trying to influence the officials, although he later had to accept that the sending off was justified.

In December 2005, following the appointment of George Burley as manager, Rofe was dismissed along with most of the coaching staff at the club.

=== AFC Bournemouth ===
He was working as the Football League's regional youth development officer until June 2012 before joining League One side AFC Bournemouth in 2012 as first-team coach working under management team Paul Groves and Shaun Brooks. On 3 October 2012, Groves was sacked as manager of the club, and Rofe took over as caretaker. He was sacked on 15 October, whilst Groves and Brooks were allowed to return to their former jobs with the youth team at Bournemouth.

== Personal life ==
Rofe has been engaged as a match summariser on BBC Radio 5, and spent the summer of 2006 working in the Bahamas with Luther Blissett at the annual Premier League Soccer Camp.
