= Steve Earle (footballer) =

English footballer and manager

Personal information
- Full name: Stephen John Earle
- Date of birth: 1 November 1945 (age 81)
- Place of birth: Feltham, England
- Position: Striker

Senior career*
Years	Team	Apps	(Gls)
1963–1974	Fulham	291	(98)
1974–1978	Leicester City	99	(20)
1977	→ Peterborough United (loan)	1	(0)
1978	Detroit Express	15	(0)
1978–1980	Tulsa Roughnecks	42	(4)
1979–1980	Tulsa Roughnecks (indoor)	12	(10)
1980–1981	Wichita Wings (indoor)	38	(25)

Managerial career
- 1983: Tulsa Roughnecks (assistant)
- 1983–1984: Tulsa Roughnecks
- * Club domestic league appearances and goals

Stephen John Earle (born 1 November 1945) is an English former footballer who played professionally in both England and the United States.

== Player ==
An industrious midfielder, Earle played over ten years (1963–1974) for Fulham F.C. He then moved to Leicester City, playing from 1974 to 1978. During his time with Leicester City, Earle also played one game on loan with Peterborough United. In 1978, Earle moved to the Detroit Express of North American Soccer League. He played fifteen games for the Express in 1978, then moved to the Tulsa Roughnecks for eight more games at the end of the season. He remained with the Roughnecks for two more outdoor as well as one NASL indoor season. In the fall of 1980, he signed with the Wichita Wings of the Major Indoor Soccer League for one season.

== Manager ==
In 1983, Earle became the assistant coach of the Tulsa Roughnecks. In November 1983, he took over as Roughnecks' head coach during the indoor season and had an 11–20 record and was released in March 1984. He later coached other youth and professional teams in Tulsa.

He is a member of the Oklahoma Soccer Association Hall of Fame.
