= Jeff Blockley =

English footballer (born 1949)

Personal information
- Date of birth: 12 September 1949 (age 77)
- Place of birth: Leicester, England
- Height: 6 ft 1/2 in (1.84 m)
- Position: Defender

Senior career*
Years	Team	Apps	(Gls)
1968–1972	Coventry City	146	(6)
1972–1975	Arsenal	52	(1)
1975–1978	Leicester City	76	(2)
1978–1980	Notts County	59	(5)
1980–?	Enderby Town	?	
1981–1982	Gloucester City	15	(1)

International career
1971–1973	England U23	10	(1)
1972	England	1	(0)
- * Club domestic league appearances and goals

Jeffrey Paul Blockley (born 12 September 1949) is an English former footballer who played as a defender. He made over 300 Football League appearances and was capped by the England national football team.

== Playing career ==
Blockley was born in Leicester but began his career with Coventry City, making his debut for them in the 1968–69 season. A central defender, he played nearly 150 league matches for Coventry and was capped by the England U23 side. In October 1972 he was snapped up by Arsenal for a fee of £200,000, as the intended replacement for former captain Frank McLintock. He made his debut for Arsenal in a 1–0 loss to Sheffield United on 7 October 1972, and four days later made his full England debut, against Yugoslavia, which finished 1-1.

Towards the end of his first season, and playing despite an injury, Blockley's uncertainty in the FA Cup semi-final against Sunderland contributed to Arsenal's defeat, and his relationship with the supporters never really recovered. However, with Frank McLintock leaving Arsenal in the summer of 1973 Blockley became first choice centre back, and early in the 1973-74 season he scored his only league goal for the Gunners, versus Leeds United. However, the season was to turn out to be a difficult one for both Blockley and Arsenal, with defeats in both domestic cup competitions to lower-level sides.

Many of the club's fans laid the blame at Blockley's feet (Nick Hornby recounts in his memoir Fever Pitch that Blockley was "an incompetent to rival Ian Ure"); Bertie Mee would later reflect that signing Blockley was the worst mistake he ever made as Arsenal manager. Blockley's days at Arsenal were numbered – though he was still at Arsenal at the start of the 1974–75 season, he was dropped, and placed on the transfer list. In January 1975 Blockley was sold to Leicester City for £100,000. In all he played 62 matches for the Gunners, scoring one goal. His England cap against Yugoslavia proved to be his only one.

At Leicester, Blockley had somewhat of a mini-renaissance, helping rescue the side from relegation that season, helping them finish seventh in 1975–76, and eventually becoming club captain. Blockley struggled with injuries throughout the 1977-78 season, which contributed significantly to Leicester's ultimate relegation. After 76 league matches in three and a half seasons and a brief loan to Derby County, where he played one game, he left in 1978 for Notts County. Blockley made 59 league appearances for the Nottingham-based club, before leaving the club at the end of the 1979-80 season to join Enderby Town. He went on to join Gloucester City for the 1981-82 season, playing 15 times.

After retiring, Blockley did not opt for a career in coaching or management and instead became a salesman for a power transmission company. He now owns his own business, Transmech.
