= Mark Wallington (footballer) =

English footballer

Personal information
- Full name: Francis Mark Wallington
- Date of birth: 17 September 1952 (age 74)
- Place of birth: Sleaford, England
- Height: 6 ft 1 in (1.85 m)
- Position: Goalkeeper

Senior career*
Years	Team	Apps	(Gls)
1971–1972	Walsall	11	(0)
1971–1985	Leicester City	412	(0)
1985–1988	Derby County	67	(0)
1988–1991	Lincoln City	87	(0)
1994–1995	Grantham Town	2	(0)

International career
- England Schoolboys
1971	England Youth	3	(0)
1976	England U23	2	(0)
- * Club domestic league appearances and goals

Francis Mark Wallington (born 17 September 1952) is an English former footballer where he enjoyed a long career as a goalkeeper. He then went on to teach PE at St George's Academy, Sleaford but has since retired from that post.

He began his career on schoolboy forms with Lincoln City whilst also making occasional appearances for hometown club Sleaford Town before playing for Heckington United in the Grantham League.

After winning England caps at Schoolboy and Youth levels, Wallington signed for Walsall, turning professional in October 1971. After just 11 league appearances, Leicester City manager Jimmy Bloomfield paid £30,000 to secure his services.

Wallington began his time at Leicester as understudy to Peter Shilton and it was not until Shilton departed to Stoke City in 1974 that Wallington was able to establish himself. However, once recognised as the first-choice goalkeeper, Wallington was rarely out of the team for the next ten seasons, being an ever-present for six successive seasons from 1975 to 1981 and establishing a club record of 331 consecutive appearances. His long-service to the Foxes was recognised with a testimonial season, the highlight being a testimonial match with Nottingham Forest on 20 October 1982. He went on to make 460 appearances in all competitions for Leicester City, placing him equal third on their all-time appearance records.

With Ian Andrews emerging as the number one choice at Leicester, Wallington moved on to Derby County in the summer of 1985, a fee of £25,000 securing his services. In his first season, he helped the Rams secure promotion from the then Third Division before winning the Second Division title in 1986–87. Wallington would play no part in Derby's return to the top-flight as his place was taken by new-signing Peter Shilton whom Wallington had understudied at Leicester at the start of his career.

In the summer of 1988, just a few weeks short of his 36th birthday, Wallington signed for Lincoln City, nearly twenty years after his initial association with the club as a schoolboy. He would remain at Lincoln for three seasons, being named "Player of the Season" in 1989/90 and elected number 64 in Lincoln's 100 league legends in 2006, before making his 577th and final league appearance against Blackpool in April 1991 at the age of 38 years and 201 days. At the time, this made him the second oldest player to appear for Lincoln in the league though he has now slipped to fifth position.

He then returned to his home town of Sleaford to become a secondary school teacher whilst he also spent time coaching with the England U18 set-up. In September 1994 he came out of retirement to assist Grantham Town on a couple of occasions, before moving up to the role of Assistant Manager in January 1995, leaving the club at the end of the season.

== Honours ==
Leicester City

- Second Division
  - Champions: 1979–80
  - Promoted: 1982–83
- PFA Team of the Year: Second Division: 1979, 1982
