= Steve Yates (footballer, born 1953) =

English footballer

Personal information
- Date of birth: 8 December 1953 (age 72)
- Place of birth: Measham, England
- Position: Left back

Youth career
- 1971–1974: Leicester City

Senior career*
Years	Team	Apps	(Gls)
1974–1977	Leicester City	19	(0)
1977–1983	Southend United	225	(8)
1983–1985	Doncaster Rovers	44	(1)
1984	→ Darlington (loan)	4	(0)
1985	→ Chesterfield (loan)	1	(0)
1985–1986	Stockport County	2	(0)
- Shepshed Charterhouse
Total		295	(9)
- * Club domestic league appearances and goals

Steve Yates (born 8 December 1953) is an English former professional footballer who played as a left back. He made nearly 300 appearances in the Football League mainly for Southend United.

== Career ==
Born in Measham, Yates began his career at Leicester City, making his Football League debut on 23 March 1974. He later played for Southend United, Doncaster Rovers, Darlington, Chesterfield and Stockport County, before playing non-league football with Shepshed Charterhouse.

== Honours ==
Southend United

- Football League Fourth Division: 1980–81
