= Alan Woollett =

English footballer

Personal information
- Full name: Alan Howard Woollett
- Date of birth: 4 March 1947 (age 79)
- Place of birth: Wigston, England
- Position: Defender

Senior career*
| Years | Team | Apps | (Gls) |
| 1964–1978 | Leicester City | 227 | (0) |
| 1978–1979 | Northampton Town | 23 | (0) |
| Total | | 250 | (0) |
- * Club domestic league appearances and goals

Alan Howard Woollett (born 4 March 1947) is a locally born former defender who played for Leicester City during what many people believe to have been their golden era in the late 1960s and early 1970s.

== Career ==
Steady and committed he was a member of the losing 1969 FA Cup Final side and was eventually awarded a testimonial against Chelsea in 1977. In 2003 ex-Fox Steve Earle revealed that, unlike many players from that era, Woollett had never considered a move to the United States because he could not bear to be parted from his dog. When it eventually died he was too distraught to travel with the squad for a game against Liverpool in May 1973. Manager Jimmy Bloomfield tried to get his teammates to show some respectful sympathy – a feat teammate Len Glover was singularly unable to manage.

He spent 1978/79, his final season of league football, with Northampton Town.

== Honours ==
Leicester City

- FA Cup runner-up: 1968–69
