= Jon Sammels =

English footballer (born 1945)

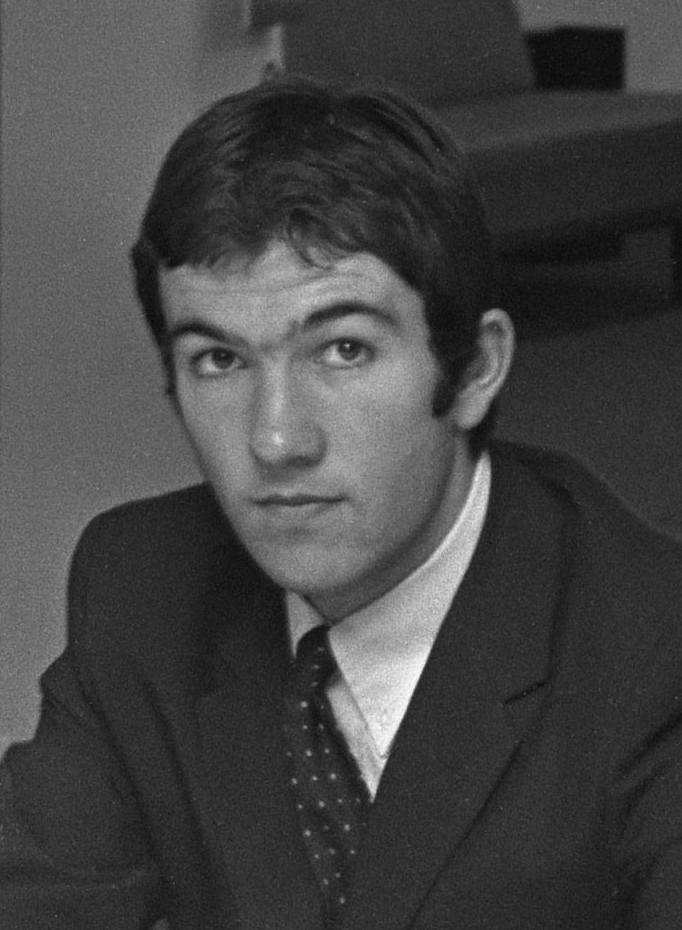
- Jon Sammels, November 1967

Personal information
- Full name: Jonathon Charles Sammels
- Date of birth: 23 July 1945 (age 81)
- Place of birth: Ipswich, East Suffolk, England
- Height: 5 ft 9 1/2 in (1.77 m)
- Position: Central midfielder

Youth career
- 1961–1963: Arsenal

Senior career*
Years	Team	Apps	(Gls)
1962–1971	Arsenal	215	(39)
1971–1978	Leicester City	241	(21)
1978–1979	Vancouver Whitecaps	54	(7)
1979	→ Nuneaton Borough (loan)	2	(0)
1979–1982	Nuneaton Borough	64	(8)
Total		576	(75)

International career
1962–1963	England youth	7	
1966–1968	England U23	9	(1)
- * Club domestic league appearances and goals

Jonathon Charles Sammels (born 23 July 1945) is an English former footballer.

== Career ==
Sammels joined Arsenal, in 1961, the club he supported as a boy, from his family home in Grundisburgh near Woodbridge in Suffolk. He was a regular in the reserves and a successful youth international winning seven caps for England. He joined Arsenal soon after fellow East Anglian Peter Simpson and played alongside him for several seasons. Jon scored on his first-team debut for Arsenal on 27 April 1963, against Blackpool. However, he only played sparingly — twice in 1963–64 and not at all in 1964–65 — and did not secure a place in the side until the departure of Geoff Strong, and later George Eastham.

Noted for his accurate passing and strong shooting, he broke through in 1965–66 and was an ever-present in the 1966–67 season. As well as being a regular for Arsenal, Sammels played for the England U23 team nine times. He played in both of Arsenal's League Cup final defeats in 1968 and 1969, before finally claiming a medal in the 1969–70 Inter-Cities Fairs Cup; he scored Arsenal's winning goal in their 4–3 victory on aggregate over RSC Anderlecht, after Arsenal had trailed 3–1 after the first leg.

However, Sammels lost his first team place in the 1970–71 season, thanks to an ankle injury and the emergence of George Graham; although he played enough games to win a First Division winner's medal, he did not take part in Arsenal's' FA Cup Final win over Liverpool that completed their Double-winning season. Sammels submitted a transfer request, and he was duly sold to Leicester City for £100,000. In all he played 270 matches for Arsenal, scoring 52 goals.

Sammels was a regular in the Leicester side for the next seven seasons, playing 265 matches for the Foxes, scoring 25 goals. Under Jimmy Bloomfield, Leicester were a talented and exciting side, but the only trophy they won was the 1971 Charity Shield, and they never finished above seventh in the League. Sammels left Leicester on a free transfer in 1978, and played for the Vancouver Whitecaps in the NASL for two seasons. He was a member of the Whitecaps team that won the league championship in 1979.

== Retirement ==
After his time in North America with the Vancouver Whitecaps, he retired from the game and returned to the UK. He worked as a driving instructor in Leicester following his career.

== Honours ==
Arsenal

- Football League First Division: 1970–71
- Inter-Cities Fairs Cup: 1969–70
- Football League Cup runner-up: 1967–68, 1968–69

Leicester City

- FA Charity Shield: 1971

Vancouver Whitecaps

- NASL: 1979
