= Alan Birchenall =

English footballer

Alan Birchenall MBE
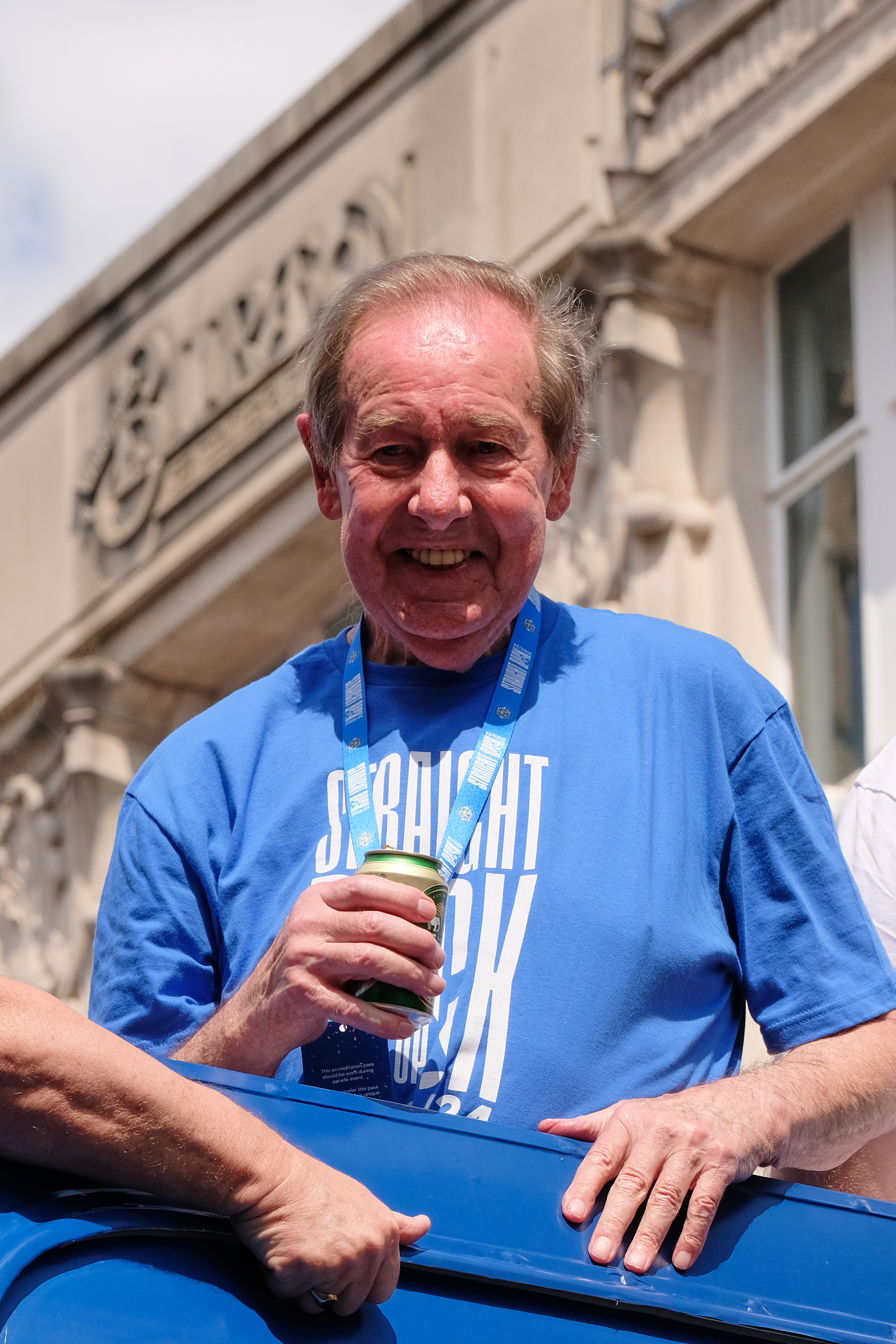

Personal information
- Full name: Alan John Birchenall
- Date of birth: 22 August 1945 (age 81)
- Place of birth: East Ham, England
- Height: 6 ft 0 in (1.83 m)
- Position: Attacking midfielder

Youth career
- Notts County
- Bulwell Forest Villa
- Thorneywood Athletic
- 1963–1964: Sheffield United

Senior career*
Years	Team	Apps	(Gls)
1963–1967	Sheffield United	107	(31)
1967–1970	Chelsea	75	(20)
1970–1971	Crystal Palace	41	(11)
1971–1977	Leicester City	163	(12)
1976	→ Notts County (loan)	5	(0)
1977	San Jose Earthquakes	17	(3)
1977–1978	Notts County	28	(0)
1978	Memphis Rogues	24	(2)
1978–1979	Blackburn Rovers	18	(0)
1979	Luton Town	10	(0)
1979–1980	Hereford United	11	(0)
1980–1983	Trowbridge Town		
Total		499	(77)

International career
1966–1968	England U23	4	(1)
- * Club domestic league appearances and goals

Alan John Birchenall, MBE (born 22 August 1945) is an English former footballer who played during the 1960s and 1970s as a forward. Born in East Ham he made his Football League debut with Sheffield United and went on to have a varied career, spending time at Chelsea and Leicester City as well as playing in the NASL and representing England at Under-23 level.

== Club career ==
=== Sheffield United ===
Birchenall's parents had moved from East Ham to Nottinghamshire when he was four, and he played in the local junior leagues for Thorneywood Boys where he was spotted by Sheffield United. Signed by then manager John Harris, Birchenall was a skilful attacking midfielder who initially played in the Blades youth and reserve team where he became a prolific goal scorer. He made his league debut a year after he was signed playing against Stoke City in September 1964.

Nicknamed The Birch, Birchenall soon cemented himself in the Blades first team, endearing himself to the fans by scoring both goals against local rivals Sheffield Wednesday in a 2–0 victory at Hillsborough in only his second game. Netting nine goals in his first twelve First Division games, he soon formed a formidable partnership with fellow striker Mick Jones whom he had played with as a Nottinghamshire schoolboy. In 1967 however, with United seeking to raise funds, both Birchenall and Jones were sold in quick succession with Birchenall being transferred to Chelsea. He left Bramall Lane having played over 120 games for the club, scoring 37 goals and having the 'distinction' of being the first Blades player ever to be substituted in a League game (against Fulham in September 1965).

=== Chelsea and Crystal Palace ===
Birchenall was among the first players to command a £100,000 price tag when he moved from Sheffield United to Chelsea in November 1967. He missed Chelsea's win in the 1970 FA Cup Final due to injury. After three years at Chelsea, he joined Crystal Palace, in June 1970, in another £100,000 deal and was the team's top scorer in his first season at Selhurst Park, with 10 goals from 36 appearances.

=== Leicester City and the NASL ===
Leicester City paid £80,000 for him in September 1971, and he remained with them until signing for Notts County in 1977. He later played for NASL sides the San Jose Earthquakes and the Memphis Rogues.

=== Return to England ===
He also spent brief spells with Blackburn Rovers, Luton Town, Hereford United and Trowbridge Town where he was player manager.

== International career ==
Birchenall was capped four times for the England Under-23's with his appearances being spread between his time at Sheffield United and Chelsea.

== Personal life and post playing career ==
Birchenall is currently club ambassador, which includes the role of pre-match and half-time host, at Leicester City. He also ran a footwear company and The Griffin Inn in Swithland in Charnwood, Leicestershire following his retirement from playing.

Birchenall is a patron of PROSTaid, a prostate cancer charity.

=== Awards ===
In the 2003 New Year Honours, Birchenall was appointed a Member of the Order of the British Empire (MBE) "for Charitable Services to the community in Leicestershire." Leicester City Council announced in February 2009 that he was to be given the Honorary Freedom of Leicester alongside singer Engelbert Humperdinck and author Sue Townsend. Two years later in July 2011 he received an honorary Doctor of Law Degree from the University of Leicester.
