= Bob Lee (footballer, born 1953) =

English footballer

Bob Lee (born 2 February 1953) is an English former professional footballer who played for Sunderland as a forward.

== Club career ==
He began his career with Leicester City in 1971 and made 63 league appearances with 17 goals. While at Leicester he had a short loan spell with Doncaster Rovers from 1974 to 1975 making 14 appearances with four goals. Lee signed for Sunderland in 1976 and made his debut on 2 October 1976 against Everton in a 1–0 defeat at Roker Park. He made 109 league appearances in total, scoring 32 goals.

After playing for Sunderland he signed for Bristol Rovers in 1980 and went on to make 23 appearances, and scoring two goals. After that short stay, he left for Carlisle United, and had a slightly more successful stay, making 55 appearances, scoring 12 goals from 1981 to 1983. His final club was Darlington where he retired in 1984, having made just five appearances without scoring.

Lee later went on to become a pub landlord in the 1990s in one of the villages close to his birthplace, Melton Mowbray.
