= Keith Weller =

English footballer (1946–2004)

Personal information
- Date of birth: 11 June 1946
- Place of birth: Islington, London, England
- Date of death: 12 November 2004 (aged 58)
- Place of death: Seattle, United States
- Positions: Midfielder; striker

Senior career*
Years	Team	Apps	(Gls)
1964–1967	Tottenham Hotspur	21	(1)
1967–1970	Millwall	121	(40)
1970–1971	Chelsea	38	(14)
1971–1978	Leicester City	262	(37)
1978–1980	New England Tea Men	72	(18)
1980–1983	Fort Lauderdale Strikers	64	(6)
1980–1983	Fort Lauderdale Strikers (indoor)	8	(7)
1983	→ Tulsa Roughnecks (loan)	6	(6)
1984–1985	South Florida Sun		
Total		592	(129)

International career
1974	England	4	(1)

Managerial career
- 1984–1985: Fort Lauderdale Sun
- 1986: Houston Dynamos
- 1986–1988: Dallas Sidekicks (assistant)
- 1988–1989: San Diego Sockers (assistant)
- 1989–1992: Tacoma Stars (indoor)
- 1994–1997: Sacramento Knights (indoor)
- * Club domestic league appearances and goals

Keith Weller (11 June 1946 – 13 November 2004) was an English footballer who played as a midfielder or striker. He is considered to be one of Leicester City's greatest-ever players.

== Career ==
=== England ===
Weller played during the 1960s and 1970s, his clubs included Tottenham Hotspur, Millwall, Chelsea and Leicester City. He served his apprenticeship with Spurs before signing for Millwall in June 1967, making his debut against Blackburn Rovers on 19 August 1967. Playing just behind or alongside Derek Possee, he showed his blistering pace, which quickly established him as a fan favourite. Weller signed for Chelsea in 1970 for £100,000. Playing on the right wing, Weller was Chelsea's top scorer in the 1970–71 season and helped them to a UEFA Cup Winners' Cup victory in 1971. Despite this he was sold on for the same £100,000 fee that Chelsea paid.

Weller signed for Leicester City in 1971, and played there for eight seasons. He won four caps for England, scoring one goal against Northern Ireland in the 1973–74 British Home Championship.

=== United States ===
In 1978, Weller signed with the New England Tea Men of the North American Soccer League. In 1980 after eighteen games, the Tea Men traded Weller to the Fort Lauderdale Strikers in exchange for Arnie Mausser. On 4 February 1983, the Strikers loaned Weller to the Tulsa Roughnecks during the NASL indoor season. He was back with the Strikers in April 1983 and played out the season with them. At the end of the season, the Strikers moved to Minnesota, but Weller remained in Florida.

On 2 April 1984, he became a player-coach with the Fort Lauderdale Sun of the second division United Soccer League (USL). He returned to coach the team, now known as the South Florida Sun, during the 1985 season. However, the league collapsed six games into the season. In April 1986, he was hired to the independent Houston Dynamos. In the fall of 1986, Weller became an assistant coach with the Dallas Sidekicks of the Major Indoor Soccer League. He spent two seasons with the Sidekicks before becoming an assistant coach with the San Diego Sockers in October 1988. In December 1989, the Tacoma Stars hired Weller to replace the recently fired Alan Hinton as head coach. After the demise of the then named MSL in 1992, Weller did not coach again at the professional level until hire by the Sacramento Knights of the Continental Indoor Soccer League in January 1994. He remained with the Knights through the 1997 season.

== Personal life and death ==
Following his retirement from coaching, he settled in Seattle, where he owned a coffee shop and served as a news station broadcast van driver. He died of leiomyosarcoma, a relatively rare type of cancer, in 2004 aged 58.

== Honours ==
Chelsea

- UEFA Cup Winners' Cup: 1971

Fort Lauderdale Strikers

- Soccer Bowl: runner-up 1980

Fort Lauderdale Sun

- USL Championship: 1984
