= Steve Whitworth =

English footballer

Personal information
- Full name: Stephen Whitworth
- Date of birth: 20 March 1952 (age 74)
- Place of birth: Coalville, Leicestershire, England
- Height: 6 ft 0 in (1.83 m)
- Position: Defender

Youth career
- Leicester City

Senior career*
Years	Team	Apps	(Gls)
1970–1979	Leicester City	353	(0)
1979–1981	Sunderland	83	(0)
1981–1983	Bolton Wanderers	67	(0)
1983–1985	Mansfield Town	80	(2)
1985–1989	Barnet	27	(0)
Total		583	(2)

International career
1967	England Schoolboys	6	(1)
1970	England Youth	4	(0)
1971–1975	England U23	6	(1)
1975	England	7	(0)
- * Club domestic league appearances and goals

Stephen Whitworth (born 20 March 1952) is an English former professional footballer who made nearly 600 appearances in the Football League playing for Leicester City, Sunderland, Bolton Wanderers and Mansfield Town. He was capped seven times for England.

== Club career ==
Whitworth was born in Coalville, Leicestershire. He began his career with his local club, Leicester City, with whom he made his debut as an 18-year-old in a 4–0 win against Bristol City on 2 September 1970. Predominantly a right back, he spent nine seasons as a first-team regular with Leicester before being sold to Sunderland in March 1979 for a fee of £120,000. In his first season for Leicester, Whitworth was a member of the team that won the Football League Second Division, whereafter Leicester remained in the top flight until 1978. Whitworth scored the goal which won the Charity Shield for Leicester in 1971, a year in which the Second Division champions were invited to play the FA Cup runners-up, Liverpool, owing to the European commitments of Arsenal, who had done the Double during the previous season.

Whitworth helped Sunderland to promotion from the Second Division in his second season with the club, 1979–80, the team finishing second behind his former club Leicester City. In total Whitworth spent two-and-a-half years with Sunderland before moving to Bolton Wanderers in October 1981. He spent two seasons with Bolton, but left the club in the summer of 1983 following Bolton's relegation to the Third Division. He spent two seasons with Mansfield Town before joining Conference National club Barnet, where he was appointed assistant manager to Barry Fry during his second season with the club.

== International career ==
Whitworth was capped six times, scoring once, for England under-23. Following Don Revie's decision to drop Emlyn Hughes in 1975, Whitworth was given the opportunity to fill the right-back role for the senior England team, which had become something of a problem position. Whitworth made his debut in a 2–0 friendly win against West Germany on 12 March 1975, and went on to start six of England's next eight games. Whitworth's last international appearance came in a 1–1 draw against Portugal in a European Championship qualifying match on 19 November 1975. Revie gave international debuts to three right backs during 1976, Trevor Cherry, Dave Clement and Phil Neal, and Whitworth was never recalled to the England squad.
