= Frank Worthington =

English footballer (1948–2021)

Personal information
- Full name: Frank Stewart Worthington
- Date of birth: 23 November 1948
- Place of birth: Halifax, England
- Date of death: 22 March 2021 (aged 72)
- Place of death: Huddersfield, England
- Height: 5 ft 10 in (1.78 m)
- Position: Forward

Senior career*
Years	Team	Apps	(Gls)
1966–1972	Huddersfield Town	171	(41)
1972–1977	Leicester City	210	(72)
1977–1979	Bolton Wanderers	84	(35)
1979	→ Philadelphia Fury (loan)	21	(10)
1979–1982	Birmingham City	75	(29)
1980	→ Mjällby AIF (loan)	12	(4)
1981	→ Tampa Bay Rowdies (loan)	26	(11)
1982	Leeds United	32	(14)
1982–1983	Sunderland	19	(2)
1983–1984	Southampton	34	(4)
1984–1985	Brighton & Hove Albion	31	(7)
1985–1987	Tranmere Rovers	59	(21)
1987	Preston North End	23	(3)
1987–1988	Stockport County	19	(6)
1988	Cape Town Spurs		
1988	Chorley	3	(0)
1988–1989	Stalybridge Celtic		
1989	Galway United	2	(0)
1989	Weymouth	4	(1)
1989–1990	Radcliffe Borough	7	(3)
1990	Guiseley	20	(7)
1990–1991	Hinckley Town		
1991	Cemaes Bay	1	(0)
1991–1992	Halifax Town (player-coach)	0	(0)
Total		846	(267)

International career
1972	England U23	2	(1)
1974	England	8	(2)

Managerial career
- 1985–1987: Tranmere Rovers
- * Club domestic league appearances and goals

Frank Stewart Worthington (23 November 1948 – 22 March 2021) was an English footballer who played as a forward. Worthington was born into a footballing family in Shelf, near Halifax, West Riding of Yorkshire. Both of his parents had played the game and his two older brothers, Dave and Bob, became professional footballers, both began their careers with Halifax Town. His nephew Gary was also a professional footballer.

== Club career ==
Worthington began his career as a forward for Huddersfield Town in 1966 before playing for Leicester City, Bolton Wanderers, Birmingham City, Leeds United, Sunderland, Southampton, Brighton and Hove Albion, Tranmere Rovers, Preston North End, Stockport County and Galway United. Worthington played into his 40s making 757 English League appearances and scoring 234 goals. He also played in the United States (with NASL teams Philadelphia Fury and Tampa Bay Rowdies), South Africa and Sweden as well as in English non-League football. He was described by former Huddersfield and Bolton manager, Ian Greaves as "the working man's George Best".

Worthington's spell at Tranmere Rovers was as player-manager and although he had some success he did not return to management.

He showed flair and skill in his play; he did not wear shin guards and his socks often fell to his ankles. Worthington also had the reputation for enjoying the high life. After his retirement from the game he turned to the after-dinner speaking circuit and also published his autobiography One Hump Or Two?. The front cover featured a smiling Worthington, contemplating putting lumps of sugar in his cup of tea; the book title is a deliberate sexual pun.

In 1984, Worthington made three guest appearances for Manchester United against the Australian national team, Nottingham Forest and Juventus on their post-season tour of Australia. He then made a further guest appearance for the club in May 1985 against an Oxford United XI for Peter Foley's testimonial.

Late in 1988, Worthington had a brief spell with Chorley in the Football Conference, making his debut in a 0–0 draw with Weymouth at Victory Park on 5 November 1988. He signed for Galway United in February 1989, followed by spells at Weymouth and Radcliffe Borough.

== International career ==
Worthington played twice for the England under-23 team in 1972. While a Leicester City player, he won eight caps for England in 1974. He made his debut on 15 May against Northern Ireland in the 1973–74 British Home Championship, coming on as a substitute in a 1–0 victory at Wembley. He scored two goals, against Argentina and Bulgaria in friendlies. Joe Mercer was England's manager for six of Worthington's international appearances. He described him as one of the best centre-forwards of all time.

Worthington further represented England in the 1991 edition of the World Cup of Masters, scoring in the opening round against Uruguay.

== Personal life ==
Worthington lived a playboy lifestyle. In 1972 he undertook a medical at Liverpool ahead of a proposed transfer to the club. On hearing that Worthington had high blood pressure, manager Bill Shankly sent him to Mallorca for a week for health reasons. After encounters with five separate women, including a former Miss Great Britain, during the break, he returned showing higher blood pressure and the transfer fell through.

He was known for his charisma, flamboyance and his hair, clothes and fast cars. He once had four court appearances for driving in one year including one for doing a u-turn on the motorway in his red Ford Mustang.

He was a big fan of Elvis Presley and while playing for Sunderland would often turn up at their training ground dressed as Presley.

Worthington was married twice: firstly in 1973 to Brigitta K. Egermalm, and secondly in 1986 to Carol, the daughter of Noel Dwyer, the Irish international goalkeeper.

In May 2016, his daughter said that Worthington had Alzheimer's disease for several years. Worthington denied her claims shortly afterwards.

He died on 22 March 2021 following a lengthy illness at the age of 72 in Huddersfield.

== Honours ==
Huddersfield Town

- Football League Second Division – Champions: 1969–70

Southampton

- Football League First Division – Runners-up: 1983–84

Bolton Wanderers

- Football League Second Division – Champions: 1977-78
- Football League First Division – leading goalscorer: 1978–79

== Bibliography ==
- Worthington, Frank (1994). One Hump or Two?. Polar Print Group. ISBN 1-899538-00-3.
