= Jimmy Bloomfield =

English footballer and manager (1934–1983

Personal information
- Full name: James Henry Bloomfield
- Date of birth: 15 February 1934
- Place of birth: Notting Hill, London, England
- Date of death: 3 April 1983 (aged 49)
- Place of death: Chingford, England
- Position: Inside forward

Youth career
- Hayes

Senior career*
Years	Team	Apps	(Gls)
1951–1952	Hayes		
195?–1952	Walthamstow Avenue		
1952–1954	Brentford	42	(5)
1954–1960	Arsenal	210	(54)
1960–1964	Birmingham City	123	(28)
1964–1965	Brentford	44	(4)
1965–1966	West Ham United	10	(0)
1966–1968	Plymouth Argyle	25	(1)
1968–1970	Orient	45	(3)
Total		499	(95)

International career
1956–1957	England U23	2	(1)
- Football League XI

Managerial career
- 1968–1971: Orient
- 1971–1977: Leicester City
- 1977–1981: Orient
- * Club domestic league appearances and goals

James Henry Bloomfield (15 February 1934 – 3 April 1983) was an English football player and manager. He made nearly 500 appearances in the Football League, including more than 300 in the First Division with Arsenal, Birmingham City and West Ham United. He was capped by England at under-23 level. He then spent 13 years in management with Orient and Leicester City.

== Life and career ==
Bloomfield was born in Notting Hill, North Kensington, London. His younger brother Billy was also a professional footballer with Brentford, and a nephew, Ray Bloomfield, featured for Arsenal's youth team and for a brief period for Aston Villa's first team before moving on to play soccer in America.

He began his career as a youngster with non-league club Hayes, and had a short spell with Walthamstow Avenue, before joining Second Division club Brentford in October 1952. After Brentford were relegated in 1954, Bloomfield was snapped up by Arsenal for £8,000 as a replacement for Jimmy Logie.

Bloomfield made his debut at the start of the season, against Everton on 25 August 1954, though he only played 19 times that season, and it was not until 1955–56 did he become a first-team regular. A powerful inside forward with a high work rate and accurate passing, Bloomfield was part of Arsenal's attack from 1955 to 1960, one of Arsenal's few stars during a mediocre period for the club. He won caps for England at under-23 level, but never at full level, and for the Football League XI, and also played in the London XI that lost the first Inter-Cities Fairs Cup final against Barcelona in 1958.

Bloomfield played 227 times for Arsenal, scoring 56 goals. However, with the arrival of George Eastham in 1960, Bloomfield lost his place in the team, and was sold to Birmingham City in November that year. Bloomfield spent four seasons with the Blues, reaching and losing another Fairs Cup final in 1961 (this time to Roma). He helped Birmingham win the 1963 League Cup, scoring a goal in the final itself as Birmingham overcame local rivals Aston Villa. In the summer of 1964 he returned to Brentford, and later had spells with West Ham United, Plymouth Argyle and Orient.

In 1968, he became Orient's player-manager, and won the Third Division in his second full season, 1969–70, He was appointed by newly promoted Leicester City in 1971, and kept the Foxes in the First Division for six years. They also reached the FA Cup semi-finals in 1973–74, which they lost, after a replay, to Liverpool. During his six-year stint at Leicester, Bloomfield created a side of free-flowing skilful football on a shoe-string budget, featuring the likes of Frank Worthington, Keith Weller and Len Glover, and he is still considered one of the club's all-time great if not greatest manager. He left the club in 1977, and they were relegated the following season.

Bloomfield returned to manage Orient again in 1977, and his second spell in charge included a run to the FA Cup semi-finals in 1977–78, in which they were defeated by his old club Arsenal. He left in 1981 following a dispute with the club chairman, Brian Winston, over the sale of Nigerian international winger John Chiedozie. In a 2014 Football League poll, Bloomfield was voted Orient's best ever manager. After leaving Orient, he was a coach at Luton Town until his sudden death in Chingford, Essex, in 1983, from cancer at the age of 49.

== Honours ==
=== Player ===
Birmingham City

- Football League Cup: 1962–63

=== Manager ===
Orient

- Football League Third Division: 1969–70

Leicester City

- FA Charity Shield: 1971

Individual

- Football League Third Division Manager of the Year: 1969–70
