= Worthington (surname) =

Worthington is a surname, and may refer to:

== People ==
- Al Worthington (born 1929), American baseball player
- Andy Worthington, British historian, investigative journalist and film director
- Arthur Mason Worthington (1852–1916), English physicist
- Arthur Norreys Worthington (1862–1912), Canadian physician, surgeon, soldier and politician
- Arthur Worthington (before 1890–1917), American-born Australasian alternative religious leader, bigamist and fraudster
- E. Barton Worthington (1905–2001), British ecologist and science administrator
- Bob Worthington (1936–2008), Honorary Consul of the Cook Islands to the United States
- Bob Worthington (footballer) (born 1947), English professional footballer
- Bryony Worthington, Baroness Worthington (born 1971), British environmental campaigner and Labour life peer
- Cal Worthington (1920–2013), American car dealer
- Charles Worthington (1835–1904), English cricketer in New Zealand
- Charles Worthington (cricketer, born 1877) (1877–1950), English surgeon and cricketer
- Charles Campbell Worthington (1854–1944), American industrialist and golf enthusiast
- Christa Worthington (1956–2002), American fashion writer
- Craig Worthington (born 1965), American baseball player
- Dave Worthington (born 1945), English footballer with Grimsby Town, brother of Frank
- Denison Worthington (1806–1880), American politician (Wisconsin)
- Doug Worthington (born 1987), American football defensive end
- Edward Worthington (fl. c. 1754 – c. 1804), American pioneer and soldier
- Everett Worthington (born before 1968), American psychologist
- Elizabeth Strong Worthington (1851–1916), American writer
- Eric Worthington (1925–2006), English academic, professional footballer and football coach
- F. F. Worthington (1889–1967), Canadian Major-General
- Frank Worthington (1948–2021), English footballer, brother of Dave
- Fred Worthington (disambiguation), multiple people
- Gary Worthington (born 1966), English professional footballer
- George Worthington (disambiguation), multiple people
- Greg Worthington (born 1990), rugby league footballer
- Harry Worthington (1891–1990), American track and field athlete
- Henry G. Worthington (1828–1909), American politician and ambassador
- Henry Rossiter Worthington (1817–1880), American engineer
- Hugh Worthington (1752–1813), British Arian divine
- Hubert Worthington (1886–1963), English architect
- Jack Worthington (born 1961), American investment banker
- Jane T. Worthington (1821–1847), American essayist, poet
- John Worthington (disambiguation), multiple people
- Jon Worthington (born 1983), English footballer
- Kay Worthington (born 1959), Canadian Olympic champion rower
- Kevin Worthington (born 1953), Australian rules footballer
- Laming Worthington-Evans (1868–1931), British politician
- Marjorie Muir Worthington (1900–1976), American writer
- Mark Worthington (born 1983), Australian professional basketball player
- Martin Worthington (born 1981), English rugby player and professional footballer
- Nicholas E. Worthington (1836–1916), U.S. Representative from Illinois
- Nigel Worthington (born 1961), Northern Irish former footballer and manager
- Paul Clayton Worthington (1931–1967), American folk singer Paul Clayton
- Percy Worthington (1864–1939), English architect
- Jack Gordon (Peter Worthington) (1822–1864), American renegade and outlaw
- Peter Worthington (1927–2013), Canadian journalist
- Peter Worthington (cricketer) (born 1979), Australian cricketer
- Red Worthington (1906–1963), American baseball player
- Sam Worthington (born 1976), Australian actor
- Samantha Worthington (born 1995). American boxer
- Sarah Worthington (born 1955), British legal scholar
- Stan Worthington (1905–1973), English cricketer
- Thomas Worthington (disambiguation), multiple people
- Tony Worthington (born 1941), British politician
- Walter Brooke Cox Worthington (1795–1845), American politician (Maryland)
- William Worthington (disambiguation), multiple people
- Wilmer Worthington (1804–1873), American politician and physician

== Fictional characters ==
- Felicity Worthington, one of the main characters in Libba Bray's novels
- Warren Worthington III, Marvel comics anti-hero
- Johnny J. Worthington III, president of the fictional fraternity Roar Omega Roar and a character in the 2013 Pixar film Monsters University.

== See also ==
- Worthington family - historic family with significant roles in British peerage
- Worthington (disambiguation), for places by this name
