= The Rose of Battle =

Poem by W. B. Yeats

The Rose of Battle is a poem by William Butler Yeats, from his second poetry collection: The Countess Kathleen and Various Legends and Lyrics (1892).

== Popular culture ==
The title of Libba Bray's novel The Sweet Far Thing comes from a line in The Rose of Battle.
