= Charles Worthington =

Charles Worthington may refer to:

- Charles Worthington (cricketer, born 1877) (1877–1950), English-born Canadian surgeon, cricketer and military officer
- Charles Worthington (cricketer, born 1835) (1835–1904), English cricketer in New Zealand
- Charles Campbell Worthington (1854–1944), American industrialist
- Charles D. Worthington (1928–1999), American politician from New Jersey
