= Gemma Doyle =

Gemma Doyle may refer to:

- Gemma Doyle (politician), UK Labour Party politician and former MP
- The Gemma Doyle Trilogy, a trilogy of fantasy novels by Libba Bray
  - Gemma Doyle (character), the central character in the trilogy
