= Thomas Worthington =

Thomas or Tom Worthington may refer to:

- Thomas Worthington (Douai) (1549–1627), English Catholic priest and third President of Douai College
- Thomas Worthington (Dominican) (1671–1754), English Dominican friar and writer
- Thomas Worthington (governor) (1773–1827), American Democratic-Republican politician from Ohio, 6th Governor of Ohio
- Thomas Contee Worthington (1782–1847), American lawyer, captain in War of 1812, member of the House of Representatives in Maryland
- Thomas Worthington (architect) (1826–1909), English architect
- Tom Worthington (computer programmer) (born 1957), Australian computer programmer
- Tom Worthington (footballer) (1866–?), Welsh international footballer

== See also ==
- Thomas Worthington High School, Worthington, Ohio
