= Gemma Doyle Trilogy =

Fantasy novel series by Libba Bray

- Author: Libba Bray
- Language: English
- Series: A Great and Terrible Beauty; Rebel Angels; The Sweet Far Thing
- Genre: Fantasy novel
- Publisher: Random House
- Publication date: December 9, 2003 – December 26, 2007
- Publication place: United States
- Media type: Print (Hardcover)

The Gemma Doyle Trilogy is a trilogy of fantasy novels by American writer Libba Bray. They are told from the perspective of Gemma Doyle, a girl in the late nineteenth century. The Gemma Doyle Trilogy consists of three books: A Great and Terrible Beauty (published December 9, 2003), Rebel Angels (published 2006), and The Sweet Far Thing (published December 26, 2007).

== Plot ==
This series is a cross between period fiction and Fantasy. The story revolves around Gemma Doyle, a young woman sent from her home in British India to the boarding school, Spence Academy, after the mysterious death of her mother. There she meets Ann, Felicity, and Pippa, three other remarkable young women. Together, they discover the dark past of their school, which closely revolves around a mystical group referred to as The Order. In the first book, they find out that this group of sorceresses was forced to disband after one of their own, a woman named Sarah Rees-Toome, betrayed them. Throughout the series Gemma learns of her own heritage and the magical powers she possesses, including the ability to enter "The Realms," a magical world in which dreams can become reality, but everything seems to have a cost. This series addresses some of the issues faced by women in the late 1800s, and creates parallels to issues faced by women today. There are many female characters, and the struggles they encounter on their journey to becoming empowered both within and outside of The Realms ring true. Other themes include dissecting dualities (in particular, the duality between good and evil;) free will versus fate; going against social norms; power; and, most of all, the concept of choice.

The three books in the trilogy span just one year, with A Great and Terrible Beauty beginning in June 1895 and The Sweet Far Thing ending in June 1896.

== Characters ==
Gemma Doyle, Felicity, Ann, Pippa, Mary Dowd, Kartik, Sarah Rees-Toome (Circe)

== References to other literature ==
A Great and Terrible Beauty refers to many literary classics. Among those mentioned are:

- Persephone: Pippa is sometimes seen as being like the tragic, beautiful Greek Queen of the Underworld, who ate pomegranate seeds to stay in the Underworld, just as Pippa ate berries in the Realm
- The Lady of Shalott by Tennyson: Miss Hester Asa Moore leads her art class in a discussion of the Elaine, The Lady of Shalott, and art based upon Tennyson's poem, in Chapter Nine. This poem has special significance for Ann and Pippa, who both see themselves as being trapped, as the lady was. Miss Moore states that the lady dies "because she lets herself float through [the] world." Stanzas five, six, eight, and fifteen of The Lady of Shalott are also quoted, as a form of introduction, before Chapter One.
- The Perils of Lucy, A Girl's Own Story: A fictional three-volume novel that Ann loves. Gemma thinks that stories like it (a popular staple of Victorian literature) about a "poor, timid girl" who is greatly put upon by her wicked peers, before eventually being found to be of noble birth, are "poppycock". As with The Lady of Shalott, the implication is that women, even in a male-dominated society, can only expect to be happy if they do something to make themselves happy, instead of sitting passively by.
- The Odyssey: Kartik reads this in Rebel Angels. Gemma's adventures in Rebel Angels parallels some of Odysseus.

== Film ==
In July 2006, Sony Pictures and Icon Productions, the film production company run by Mel Gibson, announced that it would adapt the book into a film based on A Great and Terrible Beauty, to be written and directed by Charles Sturridge. People have been rumored to be playing the characters, but author Libba Bray has confirmed that no one has been cast. Author Libba Bray discusses the current status of the film on her webpage. In 2009, Bray announced that Icon relinquished the rights of the film, and so the film version of the book will not be made.
