= A Great and Terrible Beauty =

2003 US fantasy novel by Libba Bray

- Author: Libba Bray
- Cover artist: Michael Frost
- Language: English
- Series: Gemma Doyle Trilogy
- Genre: Fantasy novel
- Published: 2003 (Random House)
- Publication place: United States
- Media type: Print (Hardcover)
- Pages: 403
- ISBN: 0-385-73028-4
- OCLC: 52312403
- LC Class: PZ7.B7386 Gr 2003
- Followed by: Rebel Angels

A Great and Terrible Beauty is the first novel in the Gemma Doyle Trilogy by Libba Bray. It is told from the perspective of Gemma Doyle, a girl in the year 1895.

Gemma leaves her home in India to go to a boarding school in England after her mother dies. Once there, she is plagued by clairvoyant visions as she looks into the magical secrets of the school with her three friends Felicity Worthington, Pippa Cross, and Ann Bradshaw.

== Plot summary ==
Gemma Doyle, the series' protagonist, is forced to leave India after the death of her mother to attend a private boarding school in London.

On her sixteenth birthday, Gemma and her mother stroll through the Bombay market when they encounter a man and his younger brother. The man relays an unknown message to Gemma's mother about a woman named Circe, and Gemma's mother panics and demands that Gemma return home. Angry at her mother's secrecy, Gemma runs away, and has a vision of her mother committing suicide while searching for her, which she later learns is true. Gemma becomes haunted with the images of her mother's death.

With her mother dead and her father's addiction to laudanum growing stronger, Gemma's family ships her off to a finishing school in London: Spence Academy for Young Ladies. At first, Gemma is an outcast at the school; however, she soon finds the most popular and influential girl in school, Felicity, in a compromising situation that would ruin Felicity's life. Gemma agrees not to tell Felicity's secret and the girls soon form a strong friendship, along with Gemma's roommate Ann, and Felicity's best friend, Pippa. But Gemma is still tormented with her visions and is warned by the young man she had met in the market, Kartik, a member of an ancient group of men known as the Rakshana, dating back to Charlemagne, that she must close her mind to these visions or something horrible will happen.

During one of her visions, Gemma is led into the caves that border the school grounds. There, she finds a diary written 25 years earlier by a 16-year-old girl named Mary Dowd who also attended Spence Academy and seemed to suffer from the same visions as Gemma, along with her friend, Sarah Rees-Toome. Through this diary, Gemma learns of an ancient group of powerful women called the Order and becomes convinced that her visions are linked to it. Members of the Order could open a door between the human world and other realms, help spirits cross over into the afterlife, and also possessed the powers of prophecy, clairvoyance, and what was considered the greatest force of all, the ability to weave illusions. Gemma, Felicity, Pippa, and Ann decide to create their own Order in the caves to escape from the monotonous lives that they are expected to lead.

As the girls read further and further into the diary of Mary Dowd they realize that the actual Order existed at Spence Academy and that Mary was a part of it along with her best friend Sarah and the original Headmistress Eugenia Spence, who all died in a fire at the school in the East Wing. Gemma tells her friends the truth about her powers and together they travel to the realms. There Gemma finds her mother alive and well, and the girls find that they can achieve their hearts' desires. Gemma wishes for self-knowledge, Felicity for power, Pippa for true love and Ann for beauty. The girls continue to sneak out to the caves in the middle of the night and visit the realms. However, Gemma's mother warns them not to take the magic back into their own world, for if the magic leaves the realms, the evil sorceress Circe will be able to find Gemma and will kill her, leaving the realms unguarded.

After Gemma confronts her mother, she confesses that she was once a member of the Order and escaped the fire thinking the others had died, she also discovers that her mother was Mary Dowd and Circe was her friend Sarah Rees-Toome. In Mary Dowd's diary, Mary says that she has sacrificed Mother Elena's little girl to get back the decreased power of Sarah, after reading this, Gemma thinks of her mother in a different way and hates her for what she had done. The only way for her to ever be at peace is for Gemma to forgive her. When Gemma and the other girls go back to the realms, they realize that something has changed. Before they can leave, the creature that killed Gemma's mother appears. Frightened, Pippa runs off and Gemma does not have time to bring her back. Gemma takes Ann and Felicity back to Spence, leaving Pippa trapped underwater. As the three friends awaken, they see Pippa seizing on the ground. They run to get help from the headmistress and Kartik. After, Gemma goes back to the realms to save Pippa, but Pippa chooses to stay in the realms because Pippa does not want to marry the husband her parents chose for her, she wanted to be with the true love she meet in the realms, her prince. While attempting to save Pippa, Gemma defeats the creature and destroys the runes. In the end, when Gemma returns, Pippa is dead.

== Reception and awards ==
Kirkus Reviews said the book was "Gothic touched by modern conceptions of adolescence, shivery with both passion and terror." In 2004, A Great and Terrible Beauty was picked by the American Library Association as one of the best young adult books of 2004.

== Sequels ==
In 2006, the sequel to A Great and Terrible Beauty, Rebel Angels, was published. The third novel in the series, The Sweet Far Thing, was published on December 26, 2007.

== Film ==
In July, 2006, Icon Productions, the film production company run by Mel Gibson, announced that it would adapt the book into a film based on A Great and Terrible Beauty, to be written and directed by Charles Sturridge. People were rumored to be playing the characters, but author Libba Bray confirmed that no one had been cast. Author Libba Bray discussed the current status of the film on her webpage and later announced that Icon relinquished the rights to the film, and so the film version of the book will not be made in any foreseeable circumstance.
