= George Worthington =

George Worthington may refer to:

- George Worthington (businessman) (1813–1871), American merchant and banker
- George Worthington (tennis) (1928–1964), Australian tennis player
- George Worthington (bishop) (1840–1908), bishop of Nebraska
- George Worthington (cricketer) (1822–1900), English cricketer
