= Going Bovine =

2009 surreal novel by Libba Bray

- Author: Libba Bray
- Cover artist: Yuan Lee
- Language: English
- Genre: Young adult fiction surreal dark comedy
- Publisher: Delacorte Press
- Publication date: 2009
- Publication place: United States
- Media type: Print Hardcover
- Pages: 496
- ISBN: 978-0-385-73397-7

Going Bovine is a 2009 surreal dark comedy novel by Libba Bray. It follows the experiences of high school junior Cameron Smith, who gets diagnosed with transmissible spongiform encephalopathy.

== Plot summary ==
Cameron Smith is a high school slacker from Texas who is on “a slow but uncontrollable skid to nowhere” living a somewhat aimless life. His father is a college physics professor; his mother is a community college English teacher. Cameron's apparent social exclusion is emphasized when the author introduces his sister, Jenna, who is described as perfect. One of the first scenes in the novel is of Cam having what he thinks is a marijuana-induced hallucination of flames during his English class. This public hallucination gets Cameron sent to multiple drug counselors, all while his hallucinations continue. Cameron's life starts to spiral out of control when he is diagnosed with Creutzfeldt–Jakob variant BSE (also known as mad cow disease), possibly contracted from the cafeteria at his school or his minimum-wage job at the fast food joint Buddha Burger.

When Cameron is hospitalized, an angel named Dulcie appears as a possibly hallucination-induced vision. She says she has been sent to give Cameron a mission to save the world from a villain known as the Wizard of Reckoning. Dulcie has pink hair, wears boots, and spray paints her wings; she tells him that he can possibly save his life, but only by first finding Dr. X, a time traveling physicist. Cameron starts thinking about this journey and how he can succeed at it. Unconvinced at first by Dulcie's suggestion, Cameron changes his mind when he is attacked by fire giants and the mysterious Wizard of Reckoning — a masked figure wearing a silver space suit who is intent on killing him. He is given a Disney World wristband by Dulcie that she says is able to keep the disease from advancing any further into Cameron's brain. In the journey that follows, the “hallucenogenic mix of elements in the adventure” are all revealed to “have roots in his ‘real’ life”.

Cameron sneaks out of the hospital with his roommate and high school classmate, Gonzo, a video game-playing boy with dwarfism who has an overprotective mother. They go on a quest that takes them from Texas to New Orleans and into Florida, all the while pursued by the Wizard of Reckoning and his fire giants. Throughout the next section of the story, “guided by random signs”, Cameron and Gonzo take a bus to New Orleans, where Mardi Gras is happening. After catching another bus from New Orleans heading towards Daytona, Florida, the three characters are stranded in between when the bus leaves them behind.

While they stay in a motel in the nearest town, Cameron goes to a party with two strangers who are natives of the town. At this party, Cameron meets a garden gnome who is explained to actually be a Norse god named Balder, who was trapped in garden gnome form before the events of the novel by the god Loki, the Norse trickster. Balder joins the two boys in their road trip. After the diner they stop at is attacked by fire giants revealed to be working with the Wizard, they purchase a car (a fictional Cadillac Rocinante) and drive the rest of the way to Florida, not risking public transportation because after the diner blew up, they were listed as nationally wanted terrorists.

On the way, they pick up three college-age hitchhikers on their way to the YA! Party House, explained to be the headquarters of a very popular TV show of the same name. Once they get to the Party House, Cameron and Gonzo find out that the three boys stole Balder in order to sell him on one of the station's game shows. Cameron and Gonzo, after being on game shows of their own which they win using obscure knowledge gleaned from Cameron's pre-road trip life, sneak into the dressing room of the show's host to steal Balder back.

Once the three protagonists are reunited, they continue on to the beach for an afternoon on Balder's urging, humoring his explanation that his Norse ship is waiting for him once he gets to the shore to take him back to Valhalla. While they are at the beach, men explained to be operatives from United Globes Wholesales, a snow globe company, attack them, trapping Dulcie in a snow globe and killing Balder using Mistletoe, accurate to the god's weakness in Norse mythology. Before leaving, Cameron and Gonzo give Balder a Norse funeral.

To get Dulcie back, Cameron and Gonzo follow the company's truck to Disney World. Once there, they walk from gift shop to gift shop, looking for where Dulcie's snow globe could have been dropped off. Eventually, Cameron and Gonzo are separated when Cameron follows one of the employees into a ride in Tomorrowland.

The small door he goes through is revealed to lead to Dr. X's lab, where the newly revealed character tells Cameron that the “snow globe gun” the employees of UGW used on Dulcie is his secret of life, and his “cure” to Cameron's illness. Cam refuses that fate, and then the Wizard appears, reminding Cameron and the reader that Cam's “clock is ticking”. The wizard is described as looking exactly like Cameron, and chases him through various doors in a long hallway, where Cameron runs through scenes exactly like his life when he was younger.

After the Wizard catches up to Cameron, Cameron defeats him by blowing on a trumpet given to him by a jazz musician in New Orleans. He then wakes up in the hospital, to the scene of a nurse turning off his various life support machines and his parents and sister crying in the background and taking his hands, implying that the whole plot was a hallucination induced by the mad cow disease eating away at his brain.

In the final chapter, however, Cameron wakes in darkness. It is soon revealed that Cameron is on the Small World ride from Disney World, which he had visited as a young child. After riding the boat to the Inuit village, he notices Dulcie, gets off of the boat and walks onto the shore of the village. Cameron and Dulcie engage in conversation in which Cameron asks if any of his travels were real, to which Dulcie replies "Who's to say what's real or not?", thereby leaving the reader to decide if the plot was a disease-induced hallucination or not. In the final moments of the story, Dulcie literally takes Cameron in under her wings, and the setting is described as the sky explodes.

== Characters ==
- Cameron Smith, a high school student suffering from Creutzfeldt-Jakob disease, also known as mad cow disease.
- Gonzo, Cameron's traveling companion, a teenage dwarf with an overprotective mother.
- Dulcie, an angel who is Cameron's guide.
- Balder, the Norse god who has been cursed into the shape of a lawn gnome.
- Jenna Smith, Cameron's twin sister who is popular in school and is not very close to her brother.
- Staci Johnson, Cameron's high school crush.
- Chet King, the school's former quarterback, who after an injury "accepted Jesus into his life". He is dating Jenna.

== Themes and style ==
The book Going Bovine addresses themes including heroism, the definition of reality, the transformation from child to adult, and the influences of love and death on our lives. Bray comments on the novel, saying it's “about poking a little fun at modern life and pop culture." Also commented on in this novel are the ideals of American materialism, modern education, and religious cults. The main theme, however, is, as Bray says about her book, how is it that “we know we’re living our lives, or if this is somebody’s dream?”. Bray also comments that in the book, “comedy and tragedy are two sides of the same coin." It also contains many scenes where the idea of keeping promises and not leaving friends in times of need is expressed. A theme that is shown most often through Cameron is that, Bray says, “culture tries to negate aggression and unhappy feelings," and Bovine talks about the expression of those feelings.

Going Bovine is written to follow Cameron's stream of consciousness and follows a journey-like style, and is based on the novel “Don Quixote." The novel also contains many allusions to “Quixote” in plot, theme and characters. Many influences can be seen from Douglas Adams’ “Hitchhikers Guide to the Galaxy” in Bray's style of humor, as well as Nick Hornby's “Slam." The style has been categorized by one critic as “absurdist comedy."

This novel is a stylistic stretch for Bray, though she describes it as one she “had to write, even though it could be career suicide." Bray wrote Bovine between two other novels, the Gemma Doyle series and Beauty Queens. Bray says that she wrote it after hearing from her mother about a man in their hometown who had contracted mad cow disease.

== Reception ==
The novel received an overwhelming number of positive reviews from various sources, though some did criticize it. The publication Teenreads said the book had a “perplexing plot." Another critic claimed that readers “may not feel equally engaged in each of the novel's lengthy episodes”. However, the majority of reviews were positive, including one critic calling it a “hilarious and hallucinatory quest” created out of a “hopeless situation." Teen Ink described the book as "funny and raw". One writer labeled it an “absurdist comedy” for “fans of Douglas Adams... seeking more inspired lunacy." The plot is described the plot as a “journey of epic proportions” by School Library Journal's Betty Carter.

== Awards ==
- 2009 Children's Book Sense Pick, and won Publishers Weekly Best Children's Book of the Year and Booklist Books for Youth Editors' Choice in 2009.
- 2010 Michael L. Printz Award winner, an award for a book that exemplifies literary excellence in young adult literature.
- 2010 Locus Award for Best Young Adult Book nominee
