= Bob Worthington (footballer) =

English footballer

Personal information
- Full name: Peter Robert Worthington
- Date of birth: 22 April 1947 (age 79)
- Place of birth: Halifax, England
- Position: Full back

Youth career
- Halifax Town

Senior career*
Years	Team	Apps	(Gls)
1964–1966	Halifax Town	12	(0)
1966–1968	Middlesbrough	2	(0)
1968–1974	Notts County	232	(1)
1974–1975	Southend United	20	(1)
1975	→ Hartlepool United (loan)	6	(0)
Total		272	(2)
- * Club domestic league appearances and goals

Peter Robert Worthington (born 22 April 1947) is an English former professional footballer who played as a left back, making nearly 300 appearances in the Football League.

== Personal life ==
Born in Halifax, Worthington had two brothers who were also professional footballers - Dave and Frank. His nephew Gary was also a professional footballer.

== Career ==
Worthington played in the Football League for Halifax Town, Middlesbrough, Notts County, Southend United and Hartlepool United.
