= Gary Worthington =

English footballer

Personal information
- Date of birth: 10 November 1966 (age 59)
- Place of birth: Cleethorpes, England
- Height: 5 ft 10 in (1.78 m)
- Position: Striker

Team information
- Current team: Manchester City (scout)

Youth career
- 1984–1986: Manchester United

Senior career*
Years	Team	Apps	(Gls)
1986–1987	Huddersfield Town	0	(0)
1987–1989	Darlington	40	(15)
1989–1991	Wrexham	72	(18)
1991–1993	Wigan Athletic	63	(20)
1993–1994	Exeter City	15	(1)
1994	→ Doncaster Rovers (loan)	8	(2)
	Halifax Town	?	(?)
Total		198	(56)

International career
1984	England Youth	1	(0)
- * Club domestic league appearances and goals

Gary Worthington (born 10 November 1966) is an English former professional footballer who played as a striker. Active in the Football League between 1984 and 1994, Worthington made nearly 200 career appearances, scoring over 50 goals. After retiring as a player, Worthington became a football coach and scout, and is currently head of player recruitment at Manchester City.

== Early and personal life ==
Born in Cleethorpes, Worthington is the son of former professional footballer Dave Worthington. His uncles Bob and Frank were also professional footballers.

== Career ==
=== Playing career ===
Worthington was a youth player with Manchester United, but did not make any first-team appearances before moving to Huddersfield Town. He also played in the Football League for Darlington, Wrexham, Wigan Athletic, Exeter City and Doncaster Rovers. He later played non-League football with Halifax Town.

=== Coaching and scouting career ===
After retiring as a player, Worthington worked in youth development with the Academies of Leeds United and Chelsea, before being appointed Assistant Head of Player Recruitment at Manchester City in June 2010.
