= Tom Worthington (footballer) =

Welsh footballer

Personal information
- Full name: Thomas Worthington
- Date of birth: 1866
- Position: Midfielder

Senior career*
Years	Team	Apps	(Gls)
1893–1895	Newtown		

International career
1894	Wales	1	(0)
- * Club domestic league appearances and goals

Thomas Worthington (born 1866; date of death unknown) was a Welsh footballer who played as a midfielder and made one appearance for the Wales national team.

== Career ==
Worthington made his first and only international appearance for Wales on 24 March 1894 in the 1893–94 British Home Championship against Scotland. The away match, which took place in Kilmarnock, finished as a 2–5 loss for Wales.

== Career statistics ==
=== International ===
Wales
Year	Apps	Goals
1894	1	0
Total	1	0
