= Dave Worthington =

English footballer (born 1945)

Personal information
- Full name: David Worthington
- Date of birth: 28 March 1945 (age 81)
- Place of birth: Halifax, England
- Height: 5 ft 10 in (1.78 m)
- Position: Right back

Youth career
- Halifax Town

Senior career*
Years	Team	Apps	(Gls)
1961–1964	Halifax Town	37	(8)
1964–1966	Barrow	61	(7)
1966–1973	Grimsby Town	293	(14)
1973	→ Halifax Town (loan)	5	(0)
1973–1976	Southend United	95	(0)
- Cambridge City
Total		491	(29)

Managerial career
- Cambridge City
- 1999: Halifax Town
- * Club domestic league appearances and goals

David Worthington (born 28 March 1945) is an English former professional football player and coach. Worthington, who played as a right back, made nearly 500 appearances in the Football League between 1961 and 1976.

== Personal life ==
Born in Halifax, Worthington had two brothers who were also professional footballers – Bob and Frank.

His son Gary was also a professional footballer.

== Career ==
Worthington made nearly 500 appearances in the Football League between 1961 and 1976 for Halifax Town, Barrow, Grimsby Town and Southend United. At Grimsby between 1966 and 1973, he made 293 appearances in the Football League, scoring 14 goals in the process. Worthington was part of the 1971–72 team that won the Division Four title.

Worthington later became player-manager of non-league Cambridge City. Worthington also had a brief spell as Halifax Town caretaker manager in 1999.

Worthington started scouting at Halifax Town, after they went into administration in 2002 he joined Neil Thompson at Boston United before being hired by Sam Allardyce at Bolton Wanderers in 2003. He was hired by Chelsea in 2007 before working in Portugal and Spain for Hull City's former manager Phil Brown. He then rejoined Allardyce, watching matches in the Spanish and French leagues to identify potential signings for Blackburn Rovers.

Worthington was crucial to some of Allardyce's signings, spotting Abdoulaye Faye on loan at French side Istres for whom Bolton Wanderers paid £750,000 and later sold for £2 million. Worthington's biggest success was striker Nicolas Anelka, who he guided back to the Premier League to Bolton in 2006 from Fenerbahçe, "It was against everyone's view to sign Anelka," Worthington said. He also recommended his move to Chelsea two seasons later. "I tried to get Karim Benzema (now at Real Madrid) to Chelsea from Lyon when he was 18," Worthington said. "At Bolton, I also tracked Hugo Lloris (now a reigning Ligue 1 goalkeeper of the year at Lyon) at his hometown club Nice, and a young Samir Nasri – but Marseille wanted 12 million euros rather than our offer of three million."

Worthington lives in Spain as of August 2012, working as an international scout for Premier League side Sunderland.

== Honours ==
Grimsby Town

- Division Four: 1971–72
