= Rebel Angels (novel) =

2005 novel by Libba Bray

- The American hardcover of the book
- Author: Libba Bray
- Language: English
- Genre: Fantasy novel
- Publisher: Random House
- Publication date: 2006
- Publication place: United States
- Media type: Print (Hardcover)
- Pages: 548
- Preceded by: A Great and Terrible Beauty
- Followed by: The Sweet Far Thing

Rebel Angels is the second book in a fantasy trilogy by Libba Bray. It is the sequel to A Great and Terrible Beauty and continues the story of Gemma Doyle, a girl in the late 19th century with the power of second sight. The novel follows Gemma and her friends, Felicity and Ann, during their winter break from school. Rebel Angels comments on the life of women in the 19th century, fantasy, and mythology.

Rebel Angels was released in paperback in January 2007, and extras included a preview scene for the third book in the trilogy, The Sweet Far Thing, and an interview with author Libba Bray. This preview scene did not appear in the published novel.

== Plot summary ==
The story picks up two months after the events in the first book. The opening chapter is narrated by Kartik, who has been brought before a council of the Rakshana. He is told that by destroying the Runes, Gemma released the magic, making it available to all the creatures in the realms, including the evil Circe and her allies in the Winterlands. Kartik is charged with helping Gemma find the Temple in the realms, where the magic can be bound by the Rakshana, and when that is completed he is to kill her.

The rest of the story is narrated by Gemma, in the present tense. Gemma is told by Kartik that she must find a "Temple" in the realms to bind the magic "in the name of the Eastern Star"; unbeknownst to Gemma, saying that line would give the Rakshana the power.

At Christmas break, Gemma leaves the Spence School and goes to her family's home in London, where she has never been before. Gemma's brother Tom is late to pick her up at the train station. Gemma believes a member of the Rakshana is following her. She runs up to a young man and pretends she knows him, under the pretense that the other man following her will go away. The young man turns out to be Simon Middleton, a young aristocrat who is immediately smitten with her. Middleton invites her and her family to dinner, and he begins to court Gemma.

Gemma finds out that her brother attended Eton with Simon. Gemma runs into Miss Hester Asa Moore, her former art teacher who mentored her at Spence, and who has now taken a flat in London. A new teacher turns up at Spence, Miss McCleethy, whom Gemma suspects is Circe. At Bethlem Royal Hospital (i.e. "Bedlam"), where Tom works, one of his patients is a girl named Nell Hawkins, who murmurs of the Temple. Gemma visits her, and through Nell's ramblings, she begins putting together clues as to the location of the Temple. She also discovers that Nell was a student at a finishing school that Miss McCleethy had taught at before coming to Spence, as well as three other girls whose terrible fate Gemma repeatedly envisions. Together with Ann and Felicity, they meet up with their deceased friend Pippa, who has remained in the realms, and they try to locate the Temple.

Ann has gone to stay with Felicity for the holidays and with Felicity's assistance, parades around pretending to be Russian nobility. Ann hopes this will impress Tom, among others, whom she has fallen in love with. Felicity's mother returns from Paris, and gossip is all about it. After Felicity's parents take in her orphaned cousin, Polly, as a ward, Felicity tells Polly to lock her doors and "not let Uncle in"; Gemma surmises that her friend was molested by her father as a little girl. Gemma must also tend to her father, who has taken ill several times and is eventually placed in a rehabilitation sanatorium. Gemma, Felicity, Ann, and Kartik make a ragtag crew, and Kartik advances his moves on Gemma, which she declines, still unsure of what she wants. In the end, Ann admits to Tom her deception, and he scolds her.

Eventually, Gemma discovers that Miss Moore is Circe, whom she defeats in a climactic battle, binding the magic not to the Order or the Rakshana, but among everybody in the realms, declaring that she is "the temple" and the magic is inside her. Pippa, who wants desperately to remain in the realms forever, is slowly being corrupted by the dark spirits and is no longer their friend. Kartik helps Gemma escape from the Rakshana and turns his back on them forever. Gemma rejects Simon, knowing he could never accept her for who she truly is, but Simon continues to pursue her.
