= Elizabeth Strong Worthington =

American writer

- Born: October 5, 1851; Rushville, New York, United States of America
- Died: October 2, 1916 (aged 64); Los Angeles, California, United States of America
- Occupation: Writer
- Writing career
- Pen name: Griffith A. Nicholas
- Notable work: How to Cook Husbands (1898)

Elizabeth Strong Worthington (October 5, 1851 – October 2, 1916) was an American writer during the latter part of the 19th century.

Her first books, When Peggy Smiled: A Love Story and The Biddy Club, were published in 1888. They were followed, in 1898, by The Little Brown Dog and How to Cook Husbands, the later of which was discussed anew in a 2019 article. Her final book was The Gentle Art of Cooking Wives, published in 1900.

She sometimes wrote under the pen name Griffith A. Nicholas.

== Critical reception ==
During her lifetime, Worthington’s works received a mixture of popular and critical attention. Newspaper advertisements promoted her writing in striking terms. An advertisement for her book Our Children in Peril in The Independent (1903) praised it as addressing "one of the most momentous problems of modern times is discussed in this book so powerfully that it will startle and arouse the fathers and mothers of this country." Similarly, a New York Times advertisement from the same month marketed it as "one of the most momentous problems in modern life—the unrecognized vicious practices among the pupils of our public schools—is treated in this work so sanely, so fearlessly, that the revelations made will astound the fathers and mothers of the land." These promotional materials emphasized the reformist urgency of Worthington’s work.

However, not all public reactions to Worthington were favorable. In a 1898 article responding to a letter she had written to a newspaper criticizing his comments about women war workers, Ambrose Bierce sarcastically described Worthington as having been "created free and equal and endowed by her creator with an inalienable lack of the sense of humor," while urging her to "take a more cheerful view of things, stop biting her funny thumb at me and send [him] a peace offering."

In the decades following her death, Worthington’s works continued to attract attention. Rebecca B. Edwards, in her dissertation Gender in American Politics, 1880–1900, writes that "Elizabeth Strong Worthington, an Oregon Republican, offered lectures instead of conventional stump speeches. In Sheen or Shine she addressed various aspects of the currency issue and interspersed her remarks with 'a series of stereopticon views.'" According to Edwards, these methods "reassured women in their first speaking attempts" while also "blunting the challenge to male politicians," allowing Worthington to present herself as a "public educator in the reform mode."

Sarah W. Walden, in her dissertation Reforming Tastes: Taste as a Print Aesthetic in American Cookery Writing, identifies How to Cook Husbands (1898) as "an example of the genre fluidity common in women’s print culture, as well as its pervasive emphasis on food and domesticity." Rather than presenting a traditional married woman nurturing her family, Worthington "varies the common domestic trope of the married white middle-class woman cooking to nurture her family. She presents instead an unmarried heroine doling out marital advice in the form of recipes." Walden argues that by making humans the subjects of her recipes, Worthington "demonstrates the flaws in society’s emphasis on the authority of the recipe in determining domestic standards." Walden further observes that no character or institution escapes Worthington’s critique: "Men and women, marriage and motherhood, science and sentimentality, all are combined in the novel to give a pointed critique of industrial culture and domestic advice literature, and to illustrate the far-reaching, and perhaps unanticipated, application of reform mentality."

== Popular Works ==
How to Cook Husbands, her most popular work, was published in 1898. This book used a combination of humor and metaphors to tell women how their husbands should be treated. Each section contained a “recipe” that had nothing to do with food, they more so concerned marital behaviors and preferences. It is also important to note that this work does not explicitly seek to reform the home.

The Gentle Art of Cooking Wives, was released in 1900 as a sequel to How to Cook Husbands. This book is also a satirical guide and is written from a man's perspective. In this book, Worthington uses humor and irony to mock the idea that women should be controlled by their husbands. Even though this book is viewed as lighthearted, it carries a strong feminist message that women should be partners. Both of these works use wit and humor to criticize gender roles and show how outdated they really are. These popular writings appeared in many standard magazines over the years.

The Little Brown Dog is another popular piece written by Worthington in 1898. This story is a sentimental narrative centered around a woman and a stray dog. This stray dog finds a new home and transforms the lives of everyone around him. It contains themes of loyalty and companionship to show the deep bond between humans and animals. This narrative was widely recognized for its sentimental value and touches of humor that result in powerful lessons.

The Chrysalis is Worthingtons last known piece of literature. The title itself is viewed as metaphorical, referring to a time of transformation, similar to a chrysalis stage in the life of a butterfly. This book shows life from girlhood to womanhood by following a young woman going through the expectations of society, personal growth, and family. These themes of self discovery and female independence were major topics during the era of women's growing demand for more rights.
