= List of Gemma Doyle Trilogy characters =

The characters in the Gemma Doyle Trilogy appear in a group of three fantasy novels by Libba Bray, which are set in late 19th-century England, and published between 2003 and 2007: A Great and Terrible Beauty, Rebel Angels, and The Sweet Far Thing. Leading characters include Gemma Doyle herself, who is able to enter the magical "Realms"; Ann Bradshaw, Felicity Worthington and Pippa Cross, Gemma's fellow-students at the boarding school Spence Academy; some of the staff at that school, including the evil "Circe"; and members of "The Order", a secret society. Male characters include Kartik and other members of the "Rakshana". There are also characters drawn from upper-class English society. Supernatural beings play an important role in the story—centaurs and forest people, a Gorgon, lost souls called "Winterland creatures" and "Trackers", and the skeletal "Poppy Warriors".

== Protagonists ==
=== Gemma Doyle ===
Gemma Doyle
- First appearance: A Great and Terrible Beauty
- Last appearance: The Sweet Far Thing
- Created by: Libba Bray

In-universe information
- Aliases: Dog Mealy Em, Gemma Dowd, Duchess of Doyle
- Nicknames: Pet (father only); Gem (Felicity, Ann, Pippa, and Tom); Lady Hope (Hajin); Most High (Gorgon)
- Gender: Female
- Title: Miss
- Occupation: Student
- Family: Virginia Doyle (mother), John Doyle (father), Tom Doyle (brother), Mrs. William Doyle (grandmother)
- Spouse: Kartik

Gemma Doyle (born in Shropshire, June 21, 1879) is the heroine of Libba Bray's novels A Great and Terrible Beauty, Rebel Angels, and The Sweet Far Thing. She is described as being rather tall, taller than most of her peers, with "pale" skin, a "decent" profile, and "a straight nose and a good jaw". What differentiates her most from others is perhaps her mane of red hair and brilliant green eyes, two assets that she inherited from her mother.

==== Life ====
Gemma lived most of her life in India. In June 1895, Gemma's mother, Virginia Doyle, is killed after hearing that someone named Circe is near, leaving Gemma with her strange amulet in the shape of the Crescent Eye. The Doyle family moves back to England. Gemma, then only sixteen, is sent to Spence Academy rather abruptly. Her first friend there is roommate and scholarship student Ann Bradshaw, and shortly after, she meets witty and wealthy Felicity Worthington and the beautiful, but shallow, Pippa Cross, at that time Felicity's best friend. All four girls strike up a rather unconventional relationship as they find themselves entangled in the mysterious Order.

Shortly after the death of her mother, Gemma starts having strange visions that show her frightening images. Kartik, a member of the Rakshana who is supposedly protecting her, tells her she is a member of the Order, just like her mother. From her visions, Gemma is able to navigate herself and her friends into a strange world called the realms, where they have absolute power over everything. It is in the realms that she meets up with what she believes to be her dead mother, and the two devise a plan to defeat Circe, an evil member of the Order who wishes to take the power away from Gemma, and her ruthless assassins. However, the power of the Order lies within their ability to make illusions, and Gemma soon realizes that the mother she meets in the realms is not the mother she knew during her lifetime. She discovers from a diary that Virginia Doyle is actually Mary Dowd, who, along with her best friend, Sarah Rees-Toome, became entangled in the power that the realms, the Winterlands, and the Order offered them. While Mary escaped and was reborn as Virginia, her greatest friend, Sarah, turned into Circe. The illusion of Virginia Doyle is destroyed in A Great and Terrible Beauty along with Circe's assassin in a fight with Gemma, but in the process, Pippa decides against returning to the mortal worlds and Gemma leaves her behind, effectively killing her. At the end of the next novel, Rebel Angels, Gemma has a new mission—to piece together a new Order, one free of corruption and with new members, much to the chagrin of former Order priestesses like Claire McCleethy.

Also unique in Gemma's life is her relationship with Kartik, a member of the mysterious Rakshana who is apparently trying to protect her. In Rebel Angels, Kartik's true assignment—to have Gemma bind the magic of the realms in the name of the Rakshana, then kill her—is discovered by Gemma, who believes that he has betrayed her. Kartik, however, insists that he never would have done it and proves his honesty by helping Gemma escape the Rakshana when they imprison her, causing him to become one of their enemies and forcing him to turn his back on everything he has ever known. In the books, it is obvious that Gemma and Kartik both feel something beyond their platonic relationship, but as Kartik is Indian and Gemma is a proper English young lady, she would be sacrificing her and her family's reputation if she chooses to be with him.

In The Sweet Far Thing Gemma and Kartik finally admit their feelings and have a romantic relationship. As a result, Kartik agrees to let Gemma show him the realms. They place their hands inside a special circle in the Cave of Sighs, giving them the ability to appear in the other's dreams. It is inferred that they make love for the first time. During the battle with The Tree Of All Souls, Gemma is stabbed by Amar and her blood is spilled on the ground of the Winterlands, damning her to become one with the Tree. Kartik gives up his life in exchange for Gemma's, taking her place inside of the Tree.

After making her debut, Gemma decides to move to America to live independently and attend university, instead of continuing her season with the other young ladies her age. It is revealed that she is visited in her dreams by Kartik, who waits to be reunited with her.

Throughout the series, Gemma struggles with her fears that she does not fit in anywhere and that she is not truly loved or valued by anyone. She has strained relationships with her critical grandmother, her brother, whose interests lie mainly in appearances and social climbing, and her father, who tries to avoid painful memories of his wife, Gemma's mother.

=== Ann Bradshaw ===
Ann Bradshaw
- Gemma Doyle Trilogy character
- First appearance: A Great and Terrible Beauty
- Last appearance: The Sweet Far Thing
- Created by: Libba Bray

In-universe information
- Alias: Nan Washbrad
- Gender: Female
- Title: Miss
- Occupation: Student/Governess/Actress/Singer
- Family: Merchant uncle who is paying for her schooling.
- Relatives: Mrs. Wharton (distant cousin) and her husband and children; Charlotte and Caroline

Ann Bradshaw (born c. 1879), along with Gemma Doyle, Felicity Worthington, and Pippa Cross, is one of the lead characters of Libba Bray's novels A Great and Terrible Beauty, Rebel Angels, and The Sweet Far Thing.

Annie (Ann) Bradshaw's name comes from Hebrew; it means "favored grace". Her surname, Bradshaw, means "from the broad forest." In Rebel Angels, Gemma, Felicity, and Ann make anagrams of their names. Ann's name becomes Nan Washbrad; she is the only one of the girls whose anagram "sounds like an actual name."

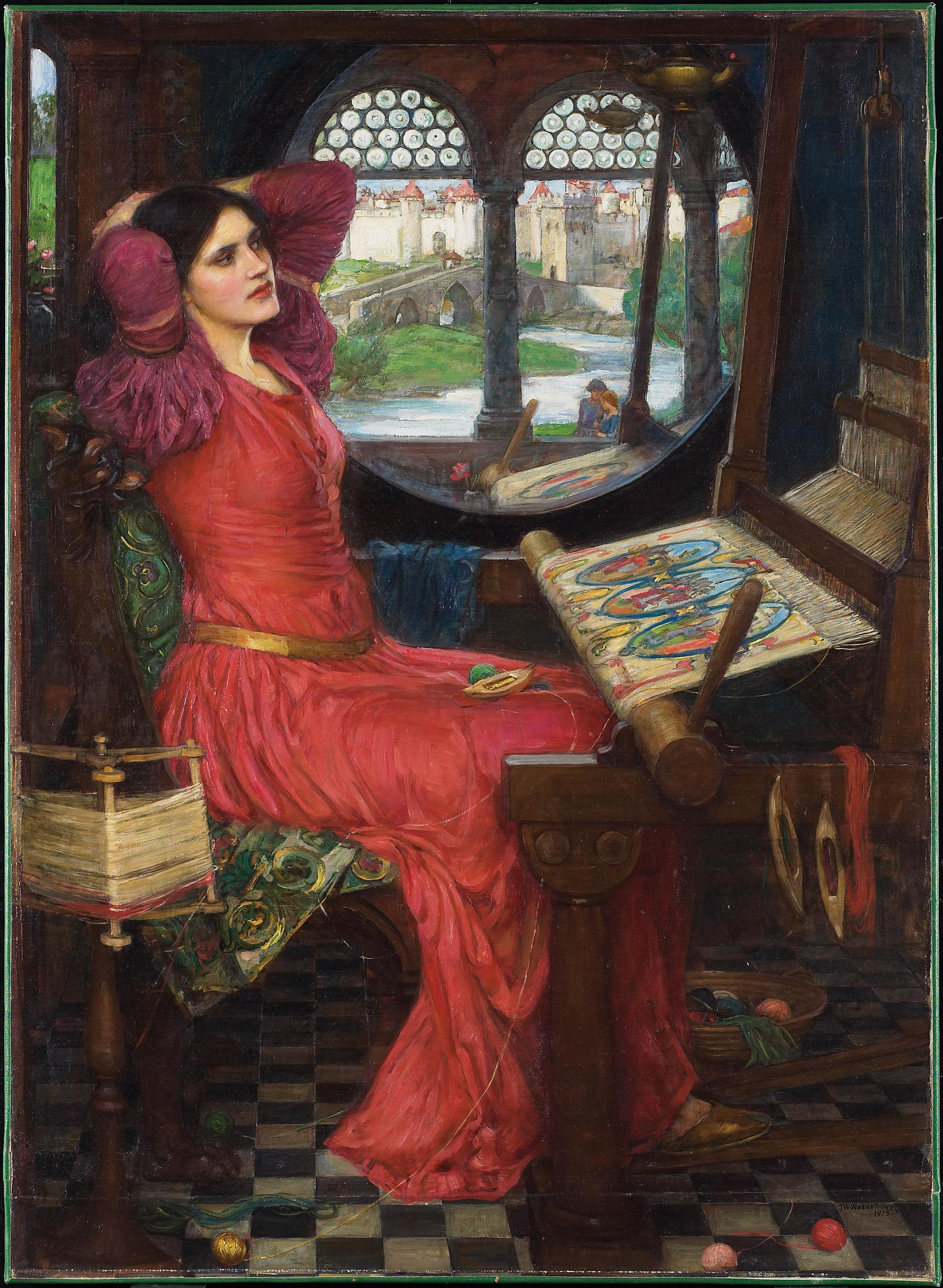

Ann is described as being plain—with "dull, watery eyes"—and poor which furthermore condemns her to the low class. Gemma says in more or less words that if Ann had finer features she'd have a chance to marry out of her class and avoid her fate as a governess. She has mousy brown hair and a runny nose, which she tells Gemma in A Great and Terrible Beauty is not a cold. Her heart's desire is "to be beautiful" (A Great and Terrible Beauty. Chapter 13).

==== Education ====
Ann attends Spence Academy, where she has been for many years. She was sent to Spence as a "scholarship pupil" by her nouveau riche aunt and uncle who wish Ann to be well-learned; they can then employ her as an unpaid governess for their odious children. Ann managed to stay fairly invisible while at school. The only subject that she stood out in was singing; Ann proved to have a beautiful voice. She lacked the money and beauty of the other girls, and so lacked friends. She was often bullied by the other girls, especially Felicity Worthington, and Pippa Cross. In 1895, however, when Ann was fifteen, a new girl came to Spence. Gemma Doyle became Ann's roommate. A friendship formed by virtue of their having no other friends and of being roommates. When Felicity came into Gemma's debt, Gemma became friends with Felicity and Pippa, under condition that they would befriend Ann, too. This relationship, first one of obligation, later became real. The girls bonded, and came to love each other. In December of that year, Felicity even took Ann home with her over Christmas break, as Ann would otherwise have had to stay at their school. There they tried to pass her off as the grand-niece of the Duke of Chesterfield but before returning home they are found out and Ann is then ruined. Ann, knowing she was poor, plain, had no future prospects, was depressed. So in secret, she would use her sewing needle to cut scratches in her wrist. But when Gemma discovers this, she makes Ann swear to stop cutting herself.

Ann has a crush on Tom Doyle from the first moment they meet in the first book and those feelings are very briefly matched in Rebel Angels, until Tom finds out she is not a rich and grand lady like she portrayed.

In the third book she disguises herself in magic and becomes the beautiful Nan Washbrad. Ann, Gemma, and Felicity go to see Macbeth and have a chance encounter with an American actress who recommends Ann for an acting spot with Mr. Katz. When she goes to meet Mr. Katz he is thrilled with her beauty and talents. However he puts much emphasis on her pretty face and not her natural acting skills or her beautiful voice. Ann realizes that he would hire her for looks instead of her talent. Afraid that she would not be accepted as she was, she decides not to join the theatre after all, and asks for her horrible cousins to pick her up early from school and begin her life as a governess.

However, Felicity and Gemma intervene, retrieving Ann from her cousins' country house, Balmoral Spring. Ann, along with Gemma, auditions again as herself for Mr. Smalls, a composer who had worked with Mr. Katz. Pleased, he grants her a supporting role in his new musical, The Merry Maidens.

=== Felicity Worthington ===
Felicity Worthington
- First appearance: A Great and Terrible Beauty
- Last appearance: The Sweet Far Thing
- Created by: Libba Bray

In-universe information
- Aliases: Maleficent Oddity Ralingworth, Miss Anthrope
- Nickname: Fee
- Gender: Female
- Title: Miss
- Occupation: Student
- Family: Lady Worthington (mother), Sir George Phineas Worthington (father), Polly (cousin)
- Spouses: Horace Markham (fiancé, briefly); Pippa Cross (friend/lover)

Felicity "Fee" Mildrade Worthington (born c. 1878) is one of the main characters in Libba Bray's novels A Great and Terrible Beauty, Rebel Angels, and The Sweet Far Thing. Felicity, though not as beautiful as Pippa, is considered sensuous and physically attractive. She has small grey eyes, "framed in arched eyebrows", set "in a face so pale it's almost the color of an opal." She is also described as having white-blond hair (which is also, at times, is described as golden), full lips, and a fully developed, voluptuous figure.

Felicity's first name, ironically, means "happy". Her surname, Worthington, is Anglo-Saxon; it means "from the river's side". This makes sense, as Felicity claims that her middle name, Mildrade, is "an old family name" that "can be traced all the way back to the Saxons". Mildrade is probably a form of the Old English name Mildred, which means "gentle and strong." In Rebel Angels, Felicity, Ann, and Gemma make anagrams of their names. Felicity's is Maleficent Oddity Ralingworth. This name is declared "perfect" for Felicity—for, as Gemma says, it is "evil and odd". Before trying to make an anagram with Felicity's middle name included, the best that Ann could find was City Worth Gin If Lento and Wont Left in City Groh, neither of which would work as names.

One of Felicity's defining characteristics is her strength, both physical and emotional. However, any reminder of "weakness" she has shown in the past (for example, her father's sexual abuse of her as a child) causes her to become enraged or depressed, or both. She is constantly trying to strengthen herself, and gives her greatest desire as "to be too powerful to ignore." As such, she is the most popular girl at Spence Academy, and in A Great and Terrible Beauty often hazes Gemma and Ann as a senior would do to those younger than her.

Felicity's father is Admiral Worthington, who is famous for his good looks and heroic deeds in the navy. He is also a pedophile. Felicity's mother is Lady Worthington, who left their family for a French artist in Paris. Felicity also has a younger cousin named Polly, who Admiral Worthington took in at the age of six. He also chronically abuses her. When, in The Sweet Far Thing, Felicity and Gemma encounter her, she is severely depressed and seems to be confused about the difference between her and her doll, who Admiral Worthington tells her is a wicked reflection of herself.

Felicity also suffers from feelings of guilt and self-loathing because of her feelings for other girls as well as for boys. In the strict Victorian society, she has been told that homosexuality/bisexuality is wicked, and that she is "degenerate." She also feels guilt because of her father's sexual abuse of her, as a small child—he told her that she "[brought] it out in him," and so Felicity grew up blaming herself and trying to believe that her father really did care about her as his child, and not just as something to abuse.

One of Felicity's most prominent characteristics is her bold sexual manner, which is mostly displayed in A Great and Terrible Beauty, brags to her friends about how many men she plans to have, and regularly meets Ithal, a gypsy boy, in the woods. Although not proven, this can almost certainly be traced back to her abusive childhood, when after she grew to be 'too old,' her father completely ignored her.

Felicity's personality bears a strong resemblance to Gemma's mother's friend Sarah. Unfortunately, Sarah went mad when she felt that she was losing the power of the realms and became Circe. Sarah showed signs of paranoia and jealousy of Gemma's mother Mary, both of which Felicity has occasionally shown of Gemma, though she was quick to hide it (Gemma can enter the Realms on her own, but Felicity can only go if Gemma takes her, a fact she resents as she hates being dependent on anyone). Finally, Felicity's act of ruthlessly hunting and sacrificing a deer to gain access to the realms parallels Sarah's sacrifice of a Gypsy child; the parallel is heightened by the respective narrators' (Gemma and Mary) feelings of anxiety and foreboding.

Unlike Sarah, however, Felicity does not betray Gemma. Felicity has a strong sense of loyalty; when forced to permanently choose sides in The Sweet Far Thing, Felicity stays with Gemma and Ann—though Pippa, with whom she is in love, is on the opposing side. Felicity's loyalty comes out in many other ways—she is always quick to defend her friends, both verbally and physically, when they are threatened in the Realms but can be hypocritical.

==== Life ====
Four unknown female archers of Felicity's generation

Felicity, though very rich, had a miserable childhood. Her father molested her, and Lady Worthington, Felicity's mother, largely ignored both this and everything else relating to her daughter. Admiral Worthington convinced his daughter, then a very small girl, that the abuse was her fault, not his, saying that she "brings it out in him." In Rebel Angels, Felicity defends her father's actions, telling her friend Gemma that "he didn't mean it." When Felicity was quite young, just after a family holiday to Scotland, Lady Worthington left her husband and daughter and eloped to France with an artist, where she was a "paid consort" and ran an artist's salon. Felicity is forced to hide her mother's infidelity and abandonment; it cannot be known that Lady Worthington is a "courtesan" or a "whore."

Felicity is hurt by her mother's abandonment—first in not doing anything when Felicity told her of Admiral Worthington's abuse, and later for "[running] away and leaving [Felicity] behind." Fee does not see her mother or father for three years at one point—until Christmastime in 1895. Despite this, she holds out hope, while her mother is away, that "she will send for [Felicity]" (though, as Pippa points out, Lady Worthington "couldn't even be bothered to send anything for [Felicity's] birthday").

"They've planned our entire lives, from what we shall wear to whom we shall marry and where we shall live. It's one lump of sugar in your tea whether you like it or not and you'd best smile even if you're dying deep inside. We're like pretty horses, and just as on horses, they mean to put blinders on us so we can't look left or right but only straight ahead where they would lead."

— Felicity explains what is expected of high-born girls in their society

Felicity has attended Spence Academy since her mother ran off to Paris. At Spence, girls learn a few subjects as ladies who needn't work for a living. Amongst other things, students study singing and ballroom dancing. Felicity is not especially good at either subject but has proficiency in French and painting.

She is fiercely loyal, though it is a rather contradictory statement as in the first book, she abandons Pippa in a heartbeat to keep Gemma from telling of her relationship with Ithal after Gemma caught them both in the boathouse. In other manners, however, Fee is intensely endearing. Most of the comic relief in the novels comes from her, especially her witty and sarcastic comments, as in The Sweet Far Thing when she addresses Simon Middleton with: "Jaunty hat Simon, did you get it at a bandstand?" She also leads the other girls as sheep, pressing Ms. Moore for answers in the first novel, fighting the poppy warriors when even Gemma wants to give up and making up her own "Order" by forcing the girls to sneak out into a cave for their secret club.

Some people, however, see Fee as too harsh and demanding, when her dominant and usually bubbly personality takes a turn for the morose. However, her commanding attitude foreshadowed her past from the start, especially when she said, "No. No admirals," when asked about what kinds of men she would "have." Her promiscuous and sometimes bullying attitude is an obvious cry for attention from the two parents who ignore her. Instead, she has to turn to Gemma to find friendship and strength once again. One of the more interesting and engaging characters, she has depth and emotion that neither Ann nor Pippa ever have.

In the Realms, Felicity studies archery under a lone, Artemis-like huntress. While not initially perfect, Felicity, determined to be powerful, soon improves. In Rebel Angels, a new teacher, Miss McCleethy, introduces archery to the students; Felicity, of course, is the best of the girls and claims that this is "because she expects to win." Felicity is revealed to be either bisexual or a lesbian (although most likely lesbian as she seemed to use men as a cover up) in the last book when she shares a passionate kiss with Pippa, before leaving the corrupt Pippa behind forever. Fee expects Ann and Gemma to "despise" her and agree that "[her] affections are unnatural." Instead, Ann and Gemma stick by her.

Having lost her first love, Felicity doesn't think that she can love ever again, at least "not [as much as she loved Pippa]." At the end of The Sweet Far Thing, however, Felicity plans on going to Paris with Polly, where she hopes to meet "others like her" and suspects that she will, in time, be able to fall in love again. In A Great and Terrible Beauty, Felicity is the only girl to know what a "Sapphist" is, explaining to the others that "Sapphists prefer the love of women to men." Felicity expresses her sexual vibrance with men, particularly Ithal, who loves her more than she even cares for him, to hide the fact that she is, in fact, a "degenerate", and in love with Pippa.

Felicity has many opinions that are, for her day and age, quite radical. She vows to have a "new suit of trousers... fashioned in Paris" and doesn't see why a woman "has to give up her name." She also speaks of perhaps becoming a painter or an artist's model, once she lives in Paris.

===== Felicity's suitors =====
- Ithal is a young, handsome Gypsy who lived in the woods near Spence in September 1895. Felicity, infatuated with breaking rules, sometimes would meet Ithal in the woods. She was not as in love with him as Ithal was with her, however, and later insulted and ignored him, causing Ithal to leave the Spence campus, dejected. He returns later in The Sweet Far Thing, showing an open dislike of Felicity before he is killed and captured by creatures from the Winterlands.
- The Honorable Simon Middleton "meant to court" Felicity, whom he had known his whole life. She refused him in 1894. As consequence, "he doesn't much care for" Felicity, and goes on to court first Gemma and then Lucy Fairchild, an American heiress to whom he later becomes engaged.
- Horace Markham is the son of Felicity's sponsor, Lady Markham. It is planned that Felicity and Horace will become betrothed, but when Felicity reveals to Horace that she doesn't feel that way towards him, he tells her that he feels the same.
- Pippa Cross is a long time friend of Felicity. Their friendship soon grew into something more, making the truth be known about both Pippa and Felicity. This only ends with the final death of Pippa Cross.

=== Pippa Cross ===
Pippa Cross
- A Great and Terrible Beauty character
- First appearance: A Great and Terrible Beauty
- Last appearance: The Sweet Far Thing
- Created by: Libba Bray

In-universe information
- Nicknames: Pip (by Gemma, Ann and Felicity); Miss Pippa (by factory girls)
- Gender: female
- Title: Miss
- Occupation: Student/Evil Ringleader
- Family: Mrs. Cross (mother) Mr. Cross (father)
- Spouses: Mr. Bumble (fiancé); Felicity Worthington (friend/lover)

Pippa "Pip" Cross (c. 1878- September 1895) is one of the main characters in A Great and Terrible Beauty, Rebel Angels, and The Sweet Far Thing, all by Libba Bray. Pippa is the most beautiful woman in Libba Bray's alternate world. She has violet eyes (sometimes also said to be dark blue), perfectly curled dark hair (sometimes said to be brown; sometimes, black), and "an ivory face that could be from a cameo pin". She is also described as dainty and is said to have a 16.5 inch waist (when corseted). In Pippa's own words, "Being beautiful creates problems. It's misery."

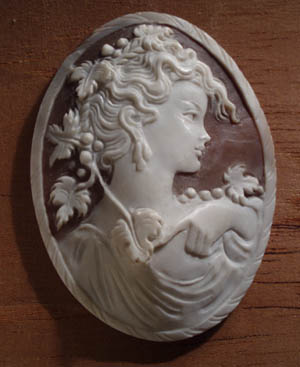
A classical young woman on a cameo, of the sort to which Pippa was compared

Pippa's first name means "lover of horses". While it may have been short for Philippa, this is never stated in any of the novels. Pippa is not a very widely used name and, though it comes from the Greek language, is predominantly an English name. Pippa's surname, Cross, refers to a place where two roads intersect, or where a cross could be erected—also, often at a crossroads. This may refer to how torn Pippa is, between her duty (marriage) and desire (freedom to find true love). Later, after her death, Pippa will also fear to "cross over", from the Realms, into wherever the dead go.

==== Childhood ====
Pippa, like Felicity and Ann, did not have a happy childhood. Because of her good looks, "everyone wanted to own" her, "constantly fussing over [her] so there was no room to breathe."

Pippa suffered from epilepsy, a fact that her mother insisted she hide. If anyone knew that Pippa was not perfectly healthy, she would be unlikely to marry well. Pippa's mother told her that if she felt a fit "coming on", she was to say that she had "a headache and excuse herself"—something that, of course, would not be possible.

From a young age, probably about age seven, Pippa attended Spence Academy. Though she was easily the most beautiful-looking girl at the school, and one of the most popular, she did not stand-out for her wit. "I'm not clever like you are", Pippa once tells Ann. "I don't mean half of what I say."

==== Engagement and Death ====
On the September Assembly Day of 1895, Pippa became engaged to Mr Bartleby Bumble, Esquire. It was not a happy occasion for Pippa, but Pippa's family informs her that she must marry to save the family from ruin. Despite her daughter's longing for true love, Mrs. Cross insists that love, desire, and marriage are not at all related; she assures Pippa that, one day, she will thank her for insisting on the marriage to Mr Bumble.

A desperate Pippa is able to break off her engagement by telling Bumble of her illness. Bumble is described to see Pippa as a "fine piece of china" that he has purchased which has a very bad crack. He is relieved to know of this before the wedding and plans to forget about the wedding. However, when he informs Mr. and Mrs. Cross of his plans, they tell Mr. Bumble that Pippa got cold feet and lied about her condition. Mr. Bumble agrees again to marry her.

While the girls are in the realms, they are attacked by the creature that killed Gemma's mother. Pippa runs off and Gemma can only take Ann and Felicity back; Pippa remains trapped in the realms. In the real world, Pippa has had an epileptic fit and Gemma goes back to the realms to try and save her friend. She finds Pippa, but Pippa refuses to return to the real world where she is seen as no more than a pretty face to be sold to the highest bidder for a loveless marriage. Despite Gemma's insistence that the realms were "not a place to stay", being only a "place of dreams", Pip merely asks what would happen if she "chose the dream instead?" In an attempt to save herself from her horrible fate in the real world, Pippa eats berries from the realm, causing her real body, back at Spence, to die. Pippa then leaves Gemma, heading off with a knight in shining armor, a romantic fantasy she conjured up in an earlier trip to the realms. Pippa is buried wearing her engagement ring, to the displeasure of Mr. Bumble.

==== Corruption ====
In Rebel Angels, Pippa, who wants to stay in the beautiful realms forever, is being slowly corrupted, as do all spirits who decide to stay within the realms instead of crossing over. She learns she must either decide to cross over or join the other corrupted spirits in the Winterlands. Pippa, however is determined to stay in the realms and runs off to the Winterlands when she learns that Gemma cannot help her with her magic.

When Gemma, Felicity, and Ann are visiting the realms in The Sweet Far Thing, they find Pippa with a group of girls she claims to have been saved from entering the Winterlands. Pippa leads the group of girls and attempts to teach them manners in a similar fashion that she was taught at Spence. Pippa asks Gemma to help her cross over from the realms into a 'heaven' like area but finds that she cannot because she has been in the realms too long. This causes her a great deal of distress and a guilt-ridden Gemma begins giving her an allowance of magic to help her get through the sadness. Pippa then grows more powerful after she gives sacrifices to the Tree of All Souls in the Winterlands. She decides that the realms have chosen her, and fights to keep Felicity with her forever and to have the girls follow her. She is destroyed when the ruined castle she and the other spirits live in crumbles, entombing her with it.

In The Sweet Far Thing, it is officially revealed that Pippa and Felicity are in love when the two share a passionate kiss. In the same novel, it is stated by Gemma that Pippa was able to stay uncorrupted for so long because of the love that Pippa and Felicity shared.

== Staff at Spence ==
Mrs. Eugenia Spence - The founder of Spence Academy for Young Girls. She is the most respected member of the Order. She sacrifices her own life for Sarah Rees-Toome and Mary Dowd. While in captivity of the Winterlands creatures, she is made as a sacrifice to the Tree of All Souls, which in turn corrupts her. She commands her creatures to go after Gemma Doyle in order to obtain the magic of the Realms.

Mrs. Lillian Nightwing- The headmistress of Spence's Academy for Girls. She was an initiate of the Order but her power faded and she lived the life of a lady instead. It is told that after the death of her husband the young widow returned, as a teacher, to Spence. However, it is implied at the end of the second book that her husband actually left her for a younger woman. Following Eugenia's death, she became headmistress. She is very loyal to her school, and protects it when under siege by the Winterlands creatures.

Miss Hester Asa Moore (Sarah Rees-Toome/Circe) - A teacher at Spence Academy who was formally Sarah Reese-Toome, presumed to be dead in the fire of the East Wing in 1871. She becomes the villain Circe who remains as the main antagonist of the story. She is thought to be killed by Gemma in the second book, but it is discovered that she is merely trapped in the realms forever in the well of eternity. As a result, Circe now knows almost everything about the realms. She counsels Gemma for the price of some magic. However, she later betrays Gemma and uses the magic to escape from the well. She tries to take the magic for herself, but she is captured in the Winterlands and sacrificed to the Tree of All Souls. When Gemma faces her choice with the Fates, she gives up her place to Miss Moore, who would otherwise would have to continually wander in the mist.

Miss Claire McCleethy (Sahirah Foster)- Miss McCleethy is one of the members of the Order. She is falsely accused of being Circe in the second book when Gemma and the others find that her name is an anagram for "They call me Circe" but is later acquitted. In the final installment of the trilogy, Sahirah attempts to convince Gemma to hand over the power to the Order. Gemma discovers that she is in league with the Rakshana, who are also attempting to take the power of the realms for themselves. She hires Kartik to spy on Gemma, and is also in a romantic relationship with Hugo Fowlson, one of the brothers of the Rakshana. In order to free Felicity, she is executed by Pippa as a sacrifice to the Winterlands.

Mademoiselle Polly LeFarge (later Mrs. Stanton Hornsby Kent)- The French teacher at Spence. She is friendly and pleasant, and she attempts to get Gemma to apply herself and work harder with French. She marries a man named Inspector Kent.

Mr. Grunewald- Music instructor at Spence. Rarely claps or smiles.

Reverend Waite- Local vicar at Spence. In the first book as part of a hazing ritual, Gemma is sent to steal the communion wine but accidentally takes whiskey from the Reverend's private collection.

Brigid- one of the servants at Spence. She is always kind to the girls, and is one of the sources for information that Gemma, Felicity, Ann, and Pippa require because of her knowledge of the school's past and other-worldly things like faeries and such.

== Other girls at Spence ==
Cecily Temple-a pale, pinch-faced girl who used to be very close to Felicity and Pippa but is now Felicity's rival after Felicity rejects her, and close friends with Elizabeth. Cecily is very conceited and snobbish and thinks very poorly of Gemma and Ann. She is the oldest of the girls at Spence.

Elizabeth Poole-a tiny, rat-like girl, who only offers her opinion after everyone else has, who is friends with Cecily. She is also very conservative.

Martha Hawthorne-an older girl in Gemma's class who tries to gain favor with the others, especially with Felicity, and then with Cecily.

== Members of the Order ==
Eugenia Spence- Born on May 6. The founder of Spence's School for Girls. She was also a great priestess for the Order. She saves Mary Dowd and Sarah Rees-Toome in the fire at the East Wing by giving her life in exchange for theirs. It is found out in The Sweet Far Thing that she was taken and corrupted by the Tree of All Souls. She is the primary antagonist for the final book.

Virginia Doyle (Mary Dowd)- Gemma's mother. On Gemma's sixteenth birthday, Virginia is confronted by a shadowy spirit and consequently commits suicide. This action sends Gemma to Spence Academy, where she learns the truth of her mother's history by reading the diary of a girl named Mary Dowd. Mary is part of the Order along with her friend is Sarah Rees-Toome. After a fire destroys the Eastern wing of Spence Academy, Mary adopts the name of Virginia and eventually marries John Doyle.

Wilhelmina Wyatt - Schoolmate of Sarah Reese-Toome and Mary Dowd, and related to Eugenia. She was mute and communicated by writing on a tablet. She was chastised as a girl for being able to "see into the dark." She runs away from Spence after Eugenia's death and becomes a magicians assistant. Before she left she stole the dagger that was being protected at Spence. Found dead in the Thames river, she appears in visions and dreams to Gemma.

Sahirah Foster - In the second book, Sahirah appears as a teacher named Miss McCleethy, a former alias of Circe, and is suspected of being such by Gemma. She had come to Spence following Circe, Miss Moore. Once she discovered who Gemma was she told Gemma that she was to restore the magic to the order only but Gemma refused to listen to her. In the final book, she takes Gemma's place as Pippa's sacrifice and is killed.

Note: There are other members of the order but many are in hiding because of Circe.

== The Rakshana ==
Amar- Kartik's brother, who is killed in A Great and Terrible Beauty. He also shows up as a warrior and leader of the Winterlands army in The Sweet Far Thing.

Hugo Fowlson- Miss McCleethy's lover and 'henchman' for the Rakshana. He helps Gemma in The Sweet Far Thing by going with her into the Realms to destroy the Tree Of All Souls. He has a scar on his face from where his mother cut him with her ring when she slapped him as a boy.

Lord Denby- Father of Simon Middleton (who was turned down when he had attempted to court both Felicity and Gemma). He is one of the most powerful members of the Rakshana and attempts to steal the magic from Gemma.

=== Kartik ===
(Born in Bombay, November 10, 1878) In A Great and Terrible Beauty, Kartik is initially a member of the Rakshana and is given the task of watching Gemma Doyle and preventing her from entering the Realms. He lives with the Gypsies who camp on Spence's grounds. He also shows an interest in Pippa Cross, but later shows a slight interest in Gemma. They share a kiss, even though Gemma is the one who kisses Kartik as a means of distraction, not because of love. When Pippa dies, he visits Gemma at Pippa's funeral. Having failed his mission, Kartik is called back to London to be reviewed by the Rakshana.

In the second novel, Rebel Angels, Kartik is once again given a task by the Rakshana. He must convince Gemma to find the Temple of the Realms, bind the magic in the name of the Eastern Star, which is the Rakshana, and then finally kill her. While Gemma is at her grandmothers house in England, Kartik becomes the driver to the Doyle family, and starts to fall in love with Gemma. Gemma accepts his advances, due to the fact that she finds him captivating, but Kartik is hurt when Gemma says she doesn't think of him as an Indian, and he leaves immediately. Later on, Gemma is kidnapped, and he comes to her rescue, and leaves the brotherhood of the Rakshana. He decides to form an alliance with Gemma and her friends.

Kartik's absence at the beginning of The Sweet Far Thing does not go unnoticed by Gemma. His return brings about bad news for Gemma, and he says that he does not wish for their lives to cross again. However, Gemma sees his brother Amar in the realms, which makes him stay, and convinces him to arrange a meeting between them and the Rakshana. Gemma finds out later that he is working for Miss McCleethy and Fowlson, however, Kartik says he is but did not wish to. Gemma is angry about this and will not talk to him for some time but later forgives him. Kartik and Gemma's affection towards each other grow, and Kartik becomes more and more devoted to Gemma. Kartik accompanies Gemma to the realms, where they join hands in the Caves of Sighs and walk in each other's dreams, where they see each other marry and kiss. This means that Gemma and Kartik's love is true and destined, according to what Gemma learned from Asha. Soon after they leave the caves of Sighs they leave to the Winterlands.

In the Winterlands, he is upset at the sight of his brother's corrupted soul and later returns with Gemma to destroy the Tree of All Souls. In an attempt to save Gemma's life after Amar stabs her, Kartik kisses her for the last time to absorb the power of the tree into his own body. He is therefore absorbed into the tree, thus it is as if he is dead. When Gemma returns to the realms for the last time, she discovers that when the wind rustles the tree's branches, she can hear Kartik sigh her name, and the grass feels like his touch to her. His final appearance in the novel is in Gemma's dreams, and is waving to her from the other side of the river (considered the afterlife), waiting for her.

== Creatures of the Realms ==
=== Centaurs and Forest People ===
Philon-Leader of the Forest People. Philon often gives Gemma the benefit of the doubt. In Rebel Angels, Philon tricks Gemma by giving her a gift of silver arrows, and then says that now she owes the Forest People, and must give them some of her power when she gives it up. In The Sweet Far Thing, Philon turns against Gemma when Cresostus is murdered, but in the final battle, Philon finally sides with Gemma, and helps her win against the Winterlands creatures. It is not clear whether Philon is male or female. In the third novel, Gemma refers to Philon as "him" when speaking to the Gorgon, but otherwise as "it" during narrative.

Creostus-A Centaur who is skeptical of Gemma and the other girls. He is killed by Neela in The Sweet Far Thing in order to frame the Untouchables.

Neela- A deceitful shape shifter whose trust is not easy to gain. In The Sweet Far Thing it is revealed that she killed Creostus and blamed the Hajin for the crime.

=== Untouchables/Hajin ===
Asha-The kindhearted leader of Hajin.

The Hajin helped guard the Temple for the Order. The Hajin are horrifically scarred, ugly, and looked down upon by others in the Realms, hence their name, The Untouchables.

=== Gorgon ===
The Gorgon was bound to a ship by the Order for leading a rebellion. She was bound to tell the truth to Order members. In The Sweet Far Thing, she gets back to her original form to help Gemma in the Winterlands. She is also the last of her kind in the Realms.

=== Girls who died in the Factory Fire ===
Bessie Timmons - A young girl killed and burned in factory fire. Lives with Pippa, Mae, and Wendy in the Borderlands. She is mean to the other girls (mainly Wendy) but looks up to Pippa a great deal. After Pippa's death she joins Gemma in the final battle.

Mae Sutter - A young girl killed in the factory fire. She lives with Pippa, Bessie, and Wendy in the Borderlands. Mae becomes so entranced by Pippa that, following Pip's death, she refuses to go with Gemma and Bessie and commits herself to eating the berries.

Wendy - A young girl blinded by the fire. She has a pet rabbit named Mr. Darcy, who was later sacrifed by Pippa, and lives with Pippa in the Borderlands. Gemma gifts her with the magic to try and restore her sight, but this fails. Bessie is often mean to her, and the other girls are frightened by her because she talks about hearing screaming they can't hear (which comes from the Winterlands). When Gemma and Ann come to make Felicity come back from the Realms, Gemma notices Wendy isn't there. Gemma demands to know what happened to her, to which Pippa tells her that Wendy was 'a burden'. Mercy admits that Pippa brought Wendy to the Winterlands. Because she consumed the berries of the realms, she did not make a substantial sacrifice and was not enslaved by the Tree of Souls. When Gemma returns to the tree after the battle Wendy finds her and shows her a plant she planted that has thick, flat, red leaves.

Mercy Paxton - A young girl of about thirteen who also lives with Pippa, Mae, Bessie, and Wendy in the Borderlands. She seems to be the nicest to Wendy, and was the one who told Gemma what Pippa had done. Mercy dies with Pippa when the castle collapses.

=== Winterland Creatures ===
They are corrupt souls who could not or would not cross over, and whom inhabit the Winterlands. They are an enemy to the Order and to Gemma. Underneath their cloaks are the souls that they have stolen.

== Poppy Warriors ==
In Rebel Angels, Gemma, Ann, and Felicity, have an encounter with the "Poppy Warriors," in their search for the Temple. The nearly skeletal warriors wear chain mail and tattered knights' tunics painted with poppy flowers, and they make games of stealing and breaking souls from the human world and the realms. Their leader, Azreal, torments Felicity with the knowledge of her father's abuse, attempting to get her to commit suicide. The poppy warriors have the ability to feed on humans' fear, and are able to transform into crows. They live in a dilapidated cathedral in the middle of a lake; the cathedral sits upon multiple bone-filled catacombs. The girls outwit the Poppy Warriors by keeping Felicity, "the strength," alive and escape into the lake.

=== Trackers ===
They are beastly creatures who have trapped unfortunate souls in their bodies. One is sent by Circe, attempting to kill Gemma. But, to protect her, Virginia and Amar go to it instead. Amar is taken by the monster and to protect herself, Virginia commits suicide. The trackers are about seven feet tall and have very sharp pointy teeth. At the end of the final battle, many trackers lose the souls they caught.

== Members of Society ==
Lord Denby - A prominently esteemed man in English society. In The Sweet Far Thing, he is discovered to be a high-up of the Rakshana.

Lady Denby - Lord Denby's wife. Thought very highly of in society. Looks down on Lady Worthington, Felicity's mother, due to her scandalous affair in France.

Simon Middleton - A man who briefly courted Gemma in Rebel Angels, and Felicity prior to the start of the series. He is later seen courting Miss Lucy Fairchild.

Miss Lucy Fairchild - A girl of high society from Chicago, Illinois. She is later courted by Simon Middleton.

Lady Markham - A friend of Lady Denby's, who eventually sponsors Felicity in her debut.

Horace Markham - Lady Markham's son who was briefly engaged to Felicity. It is later discovered that he feels nothing for her, as she does him, and the engagement is called off.

Admiral Worthington - Felicity's father. He is famous for his heroic deeds in the navy, and is highly worshiped by men for his heroism, and women for his "painfully handsome face." He is also a pedophile.

== Other characters ==
Mother Elena- An elderly gypsy woman who went insane after the kidnapping and murder of her daughter, Carolina, by Mary Dowd and Sarah Rees-Toome.

John Doyle- Gemma's father and Virginia Doyle's husband. After Virginia's death, he is so bereaved he develops an addiction to laudanum. Gemma tries to make the pain go away, but then he becomes addicted to opium. At the end of The Sweet Far Thing he is diagnosed with tuberculosis and moves back to India, where he lived in the beginning of A Great and Terrible Beauty.

Thomas Henry Doyle- Gemma's older brother, also known as Tom, hopes to marry a proper, wealthy woman. Upon hearing that Ann is really a wealthy heiress in Rebel Angels, he pursues her until the truth about Ann's situation is revealed. He is recruited by the Rakshana in order to get to Gemma. Materialistic and proper, Tom does not have a good relationship with Gemma in A Great and Terrible Beauty and Rebel Angels, though this changes when he learns more about her in The Sweet Far Thing.

Eleanor "Nell" Hawkins- An "insane" girl with delusions about the Order. Gemma discovers (through visions with three girls) that the three girls were to be Miss Moore's second attempt at a sacrifice, which still wasn't adequate. She did not want to sacrifice Nell Hawkins, as she became attached to her. Nell is forced into insanity in an attempt to block her mind from "the thing." Gemma kills Nell after Miss Moore attempts to sacrifice her once more, thus making her useless.

Theodore van Ripple (aka Robert Sharpe): An illusionist and thief who was great friends with Mina Wyatt, his former assistant. He is in possession of a slate used by Miss Wyatt that later is a clue in The Sweet Far Thing to the mystery of Eugenia Spence.

Lily Trimble: A famous American actress, who soon turns out to be Jewish and must hide that identity to avoid social disapproval. Lily is considered a beauty and Ann looks up to her. Ann, Felicity, and Gemma meet Lily twice - once after a performance of Macbeth in the third novel (to which Ann attended under the name Nan Washbrad) and again at Ann's audition for Mr Katz.

Charlie Smalls: A charming American pianist at the theatre in which Ann auditions for in disguise, in which Charlie takes a fancy to her and begins flirting with her. However, when Ann finally decides to audition as herself, he's willing to give her a chance and admires how she is bold enough to sing for him in the middle of the streets.
