= John Worthington =

John Worthington may refer to:

- John Worthington (academic) (1618–1671), English academic and diarist
- John Tolley Hood Worthington (1788–1849), U.S. Representative from Maryland
- John Worthington (British politician) (1872–1951), British surgeon, businessman and politician
- John Hubert Worthington (1886–1963), British architect
- John Worthington (architect), professor of architecture at York University
- John Worthington (Neighbours), fictional character on the Australian soap opera Neighbours
