= William Worthington =

William Worthington may refer to:

- William Worthington (actor) (1872–1941), American silent film actor and director
- William Worthington (priest) (1703–1778), Anglican priest and theological writer
- William Barton Worthington (1854–1939), British civil engineer
- William Grafton Delaney Worthington (1785–1856), American lawyer, judge, and politician
- William H. Worthington (1828–1862), American farmer, lawyer, and military officer
- William Jackson Worthington (1833–1914), American politician
- William Chesley Worthington (1903–2002), editor of The Providence Journal and editor of the Brown Alumni Monthly
