= George Worthington (cricketer) =

English cricketer

Personal information
- Full name: George Worthington
- Born: 4 March 1822; England
- Died: 27 July 1900 (aged 78); Bristol, England
- Batting: Unknown

Domestic team information
- Years: Team
- 1844: Oxford University

Career statistics
Competition	First-class
Matches	2
Runs scored	6
Batting average	2.00
100s/50s	–/–
Top score	4
Catches/stumpings	–/–
- Source: Cricinfo, 14 May 2020

George Worthington (4 March 1822 – 27 July 1900) was an English first-class cricketer.

The son of Charles Worthington, he was educated at Tonbridge School, before going up to St John's College, Oxford. While studying at Oxford, he made two appearances in first-class cricket for Oxford University in 1844, against the Marylebone Cricket Club and Cambridge University in The University Match.

Worthington found himself without a profession in later life due to ill health. He died at Bristol in July 1900.
