= Fred Worthington =

Fred Worthington may refer to:

- Fred Worthington (footballer) (1924–1995), British football player
- Fred Worthington (trade unionist) (died 1973), British trade union leader
