= The Sweet Far Thing =

2007 novel by Libba Bray

- The American hardcover for The Sweet Far Thing
- Author: Libba Bray
- Language: English
- Series: Gemma Doyle Trilogy
- Genre: Fantasy novel
- Publisher: Random House
- Publication date: December 26, 2007
- Publication place: United States
- Media type: Print (Hardcover)
- Pages: 819
- Preceded by: Rebel Angels

The Sweet Far Thing is a novel by Libba Bray that was released on December 26, 2007. It is the sequel to the best-selling A Great and Terrible Beauty and Rebel Angels, following a year after Gemma Doyle's arrival at Spence Academy.

== Plot ==
The prologue begins with two men who are searching a river in London (three years before the events of the book) for dead bodies to fence any jewelry or money left upon them. They come across the body of a girl wearing a crescent moon amulet identical to Gemma's own.

At Spence academy Gemma struggles to open the Realms. Pressure builds on her as her friends plot to use her magic to alter the courses of their lives. But after much struggling Gemma finds a backdoor-like entry into the Realms. By touching a mysterious stone unearthed during the reconstruction of the east wing of Spence Gemma can enter the Realms. There Gemma, Felicity, and Ann find Pippa among a group of girls she claims to have saved from entering the Winterlands. Pippa leads the group of girls and attempts to teach them manners in a similar fashion that she was taught at Spence.

Pippa asks Gemma to help her cross over from the Realms into a heaven-like area but finds that she cannot because she has been in the Realms too long. This causes her a great deal of distress and a guilt-ridden Gemma begins giving her an allowance of magic to help her get through the sadness.

After a three month absence, Kartik finds Gemma at Spence Academy to tell her that their destinies should not cross again. Heartbroken, Gemma angrily stomps off, trying to appear aloof. A later meeting at a boat dock in London crushes Gemma's hope that they could be together. Kartik enlists as a sailor aboard HMS Orlando as an escape from Gemma and the Rakshana. He refuses to reveal to Gemma the details of his business with the Rakshana or what he will do beyond being a sailor. Despite his coldness, Gemma continues to long for his touch. While waiting for his boat to come in, Kartik lives with the gypsies and helps Gemma arrange a meeting with the Rakshana. The topic of the meeting was her brother Tom, whom the Rakshana was trying to enlist in the club. The meeting was cut short by Mr. Fowlson, a loyal Rakshana member, who unsuccessfully tried to capture Kartik and Gemma. The cost for their safe escape was Mr. Fowlson's discovery that Gemma did indeed have the magic, unlike what she had said to him previously.

At the peak of her tolerance, Gemma finally gave in to her visions and tried to follow the clues left by a mysterious girl in a characteristic lavender dress. This leads her to an illusionist who informs Gemma that this girl lived at Spence during her mother's time there. On a whim Gemma and her troupe of girls venture into the winterlands to find The Tree of All Souls. When they find it they all place their hands upon its bark and see different 'visions'. Gemma alone had a talk with Eugenia Spence who informed her more of the girl in the lavender dress. She also learns that the girl had in possession a dagger which posed a threat to the Winterland creatures.

Then Gemma tries to battle the Tree of All Souls, which was evil all along. Kartik professes his love for Gemma in the Cave of Sighs, and sacrifices himself to the tree when Gemma was being drawn inside, and afterwards, Gemma is victorious. Mr. Doyle, Gemma's father, also moves back to India, and Gemma decides to travel to America and attend university. The final chapter ends with Gemma waking in a flat in New York City, having just dreamed of Kartik, looking hopefully towards the future.
