= Charles Worthington (cricketer, born 1877) =

English cricketer

Personal information
- Full name: Charles Robert Worthington
- Born: 28 February 1877; Surbiton, Surrey, England
- Died: 7 December 1950 (aged 73); Victoria, British Columbia, Canada
- Height: 6 ft 0 in (1.83 m)
- Batting: Right-handed
- Bowling: Right-arm medium

Domestic team information
- Years: Team
- 1898: Cambridge University
- 1898: Kent
- FC debut: 9 May 1898 Cambridge Univ. v CI Thornton's XI
- Last FC: 23 June 1898 Cambridge Univ. v Marylebone Cricket Club (MCC)

Career statistics
Competition	First-class
Matches	8
Runs scored	156
Batting average	12.00
100s/50s	0/0
Top score	42
Balls bowled	160
Wickets	3
Bowling average	22.00
5 wickets in innings	0
10 wickets in match	0
Best bowling	2/11
Catches/stumpings	4/–
- Source: CricInfo, 21 October 2023

Charles Robert Worthington (28 February 1877 – 7 December 1950) was an English-born surgeon and first-class cricketer who served in the Boer War, the Royal Navy and with the Canadian Expeditionary Force during World War I. Worthington was born in England but lived in Canada from 1912.

== Early life ==
Worthington was born at Surbiton in Surrey in 1877, the fourth child of Richard and Ellen (née Oldman) Worthington. His father was born at Grinton in Yorkshire and served in the Bombay Civil Service after graduating from St John's College, Cambridge in 1856. He retired in 1879 and the family lived in Guernsey and at Tonbridge in Kent before eventually settling at Cam in Gloucestershire in 1904.

Like all three of his brothers, Charles Worthington was educated at Tonbridge School as a day boy, joining the school in 1890. He played in the rugby XV in 1894 and in the school cricket XI in 1895, tieing for the school athletics points cup during the year. He went up to Caius College, Cambridge later in the year, graduating in 1898.

== Cricket ==
Considered a fine school cricketer―Lillywhite's Annual described him as "a very good bat, playing in a fine free style" who was "a good change bowler"―Worthington scored 316 runs, with a highest score of 91, and took 25 wickets in his final year at school. He played cricket whilst at university, playing in the Freshmen's match in 1896, scoring 66 runs. He did not make the university First XI until his final year, but did play a Second XI match for Kent County Cricket Club during 1896, taking four wickets and scoring 11 runs against Middlesex's Second XI at the Angel Ground at Tonbridge.

A half-century in the 1898 senior trial match at Cambridge saw Worthington promoted to the university First XI, making his first-class cricket debut in a match against CI Thornton's XI at Fenner's in May 1898. He top-scored in Cambridge's first innings with 42, and played in three more matches for them during May. At the end of the month he played his only first-class match for Kent, a rain-affected fixture against Lancashire at Old Trafford. He played another four matches for Cambridge, but dropped out of the team before the University Match and did not win a Blue.

In Worthington's eight first-class matches he scored 156 runs and took three wickets. All of these were for the university; his only match for Kent was so badly affected by rain that under two hours play was possible and Worthington did not bat, bowl or take a catch during the match, although he did field. He is not known to have played any cricket after the end of the 1898 season.

== Professional and military career ==
After graduating, Worthington moved to study medicine at St Mary's Hospital in the Paddington area of London. He interrupted his studies to serve in the 4th Volunteer Battalion of the Suffolk Regiment during the Boer War, serving in South Africa in 1900 and 1901, earning the Queen's South Africa Medal with four clasps. He returned to St Mary's after the war, qualifying in 1903.

After a short time working a St Mary's, Worthington served as a District Medical Officer in Southern Nigeria until 1904, before joining the Royal Navy as a surgeon later in the year. He was in the Navy for seven years, serving between 1905 and 1911 on HMS Powerful as part of the Australian Station.

After leaving the Navy, Worthington and his family emigrated to British Columbia late in 1912. They lived at Comox on Vancouver Island and he described himself as a rancher when he enlisted in the Canadian Expeditionary Force in 1916. Joining 102 (North British Columbia) battalion as a private, Worthington sailed from Halifax, Nova Scotia for England in June and was serving on the Western Front by August, having been promoted to corporal. He saw action during the Battle of the Ancre Heights, part of the later stages of the Battle of the Somme, and was part of the force which took part in the Capture of Regina Trench in October. He spent the Christmas period on the front line at Vimy Ridge and was promoted to sergeant in January before being ordered to the Canadian Training Depot at Shorncliffe Army Camp in Kent, where he was commissioned into the Royal Canadian Army Medical Corps (RCAMC).

Promoted to the rank of captain by April, Worthington spent the remainder of 1917 serving with the 14th Canadian Field Ambulance at Aldershot. In early 1918 he suffered a fracture of his elbow after falling from a horse and spent some time convalescing in hospital at Matlock Bath, before joining 2nd Canadian Division in France in August, serving for the remainder of the war with the division's ambulance train. He was part of the Army of Occupation following the armistice in November 1918, spending Christmas near Bonn, before returning to England with the division in April. He was demobilised in September 1919 after serving with the RCAMC at Witley for several months, giving his address as the family home at Cam.

At the beginning of October, Worthington joined the British Royal Army Medical Corps, with the rank of temporary captain. He was posted to Egypt and served with the 3rd Egyptian Stationary Hospital until June the following year when he relinquished his commission. He lived for a time at Cam, before returning to British Columbia in September.

== Family and later life ==
Worthington married Winifred Phillips at Maesmynys near Builth Wells in 1905. The couple had one daughter and lived at Comox and at Nanaimo on Vancouver Island where he farmed. His wife died in 1945 and Worthington died in 1950 at Victoria at the age of 73.

All three of Worthington's brothers were educated at Tonbridge and at Cambridge University. His eldest brother Edward, served in the Boer War and settled in South Africa where he was in the police force and later became a teacher before serving in the South African Defence Force during World War I. Arthur Worthington, three years older than Charles, served in the Colonial Service in the Federated Malay States, whilst the youngest brother, Richard, lived on Vancouver Island for a period before World War I and had played cricket for Belgium whilst working as a teacher. He died of wounds received during active service in 1917.

== Bibliography ==
- Carlaw, Derek (2020). Kent County Cricketers, A to Z: Part One (1806–1914) (PDF). Cardiff: ACS.
