= Charles Worthington (cricketer, born 1835) =

English cricketer (1835–1904)

Personal information
- Born: 16 July 1835; Stourport-on-Severn, Worcestershire, England
- Died: 5 February 1904 (aged 68); Durban, Natal, South Africa
- Role: Batsman

Domestic team information
- Years: Team
- 1864/65–1865/66: Otago

Career statistics
Competition	First-class
Matches	2
Runs scored	41
Batting average	13.66
100s/50s	0/0
Top score	14
Balls bowled	36
Wickets	1
Bowling average	4.00
5 wickets in innings	0
10 wickets in match	0
Best bowling	1/4
Catches/stumpings	0/–
- Source: New Zealand Cricket, 1 March 2024

Charles Worthington (16 July 1835 – 5 February 1904) was an English cricketer who played two first-class matches for Otago in the 1864–65 and 1865–66 seasons in New Zealand.

== Life and career ==
Born in England, Worthington moved to New Zealand with his wife in the early 1860s and took up the position of warden of the Waitahuna goldfields in Otago. A batsman who occasionally also bowled, he played in both of Otago's matches against the touring English team in February 1864, but without success.

Worthington played two first-class cricket matches for Otago, one in each of the 1864–65 and 1865–66 seasons, both against Canterbury. He scored 14 and 6 in the first match and 11 and 10 not out in the second. In the extremely low scoring of the times, these scores were significant contributions. After Otago's victory in the second match, the North Otago Times reported, "The honor of pulling Otago through belongs to Mr Worthington (the Warden of the Waitahuna goldfields), and when the match was at length decided in favor of Otago, he was with an enthusiastic cheer carried off the ground …"

Despite the general esteem in which he appears to have been held, in June 1866 Worthington suddenly left the colony, "having appropriated to his own purposes a considerable quantity of Government funds". He was sought by the legal authorities in New Zealand and Australia, where he was described, inter alia, as five feet nine or ten inches tall, and "of gentlemanly appearance".

Worthington appears to have spent some years in England before moving to South Africa and settling in Barberton, Transvaal, where "he was interested in railway contracts". The brief obituary notice in the Dunedin Evening Star after his death in February 1904 did not mention his embezzlement.
