= Libba Bray =

American writer (born 1964)

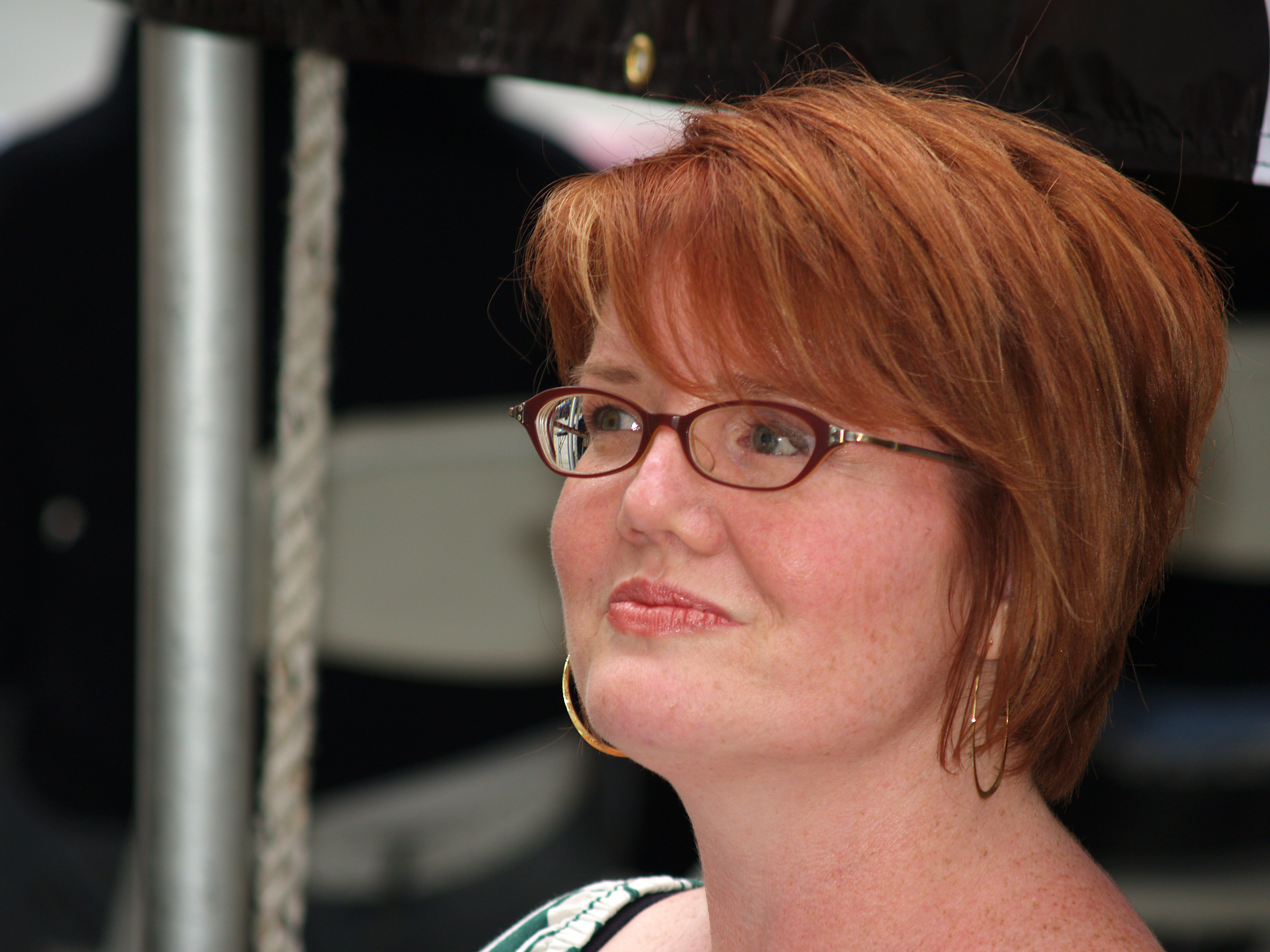
- Libba Bray
- Born: Martha Elizabeth Bray; March 11, 1964 (age 62); Montgomery, Alabama, U.S.
- Education: University of Texas at Austin
- Occupation: Author
- Notable work: Gemma Doyle Trilogy
- Spouse: Barry Goldblatt (former)
- Children: 1

Martha Elizabeth "Libba" Bray (March 11, 1964) is an American writer of young adult novels including the Gemma Doyle Trilogy, Going Bovine, Beauty Queens, The Diviners series, and Under the Same Stars.

== Life ==
Martha Elizabeth Bray was born in Montgomery, Alabama. Her father was a gay Presbyterian minister, and her mother was an English teacher.

She and her family moved to West Virginia for a brief period, then to Corpus Christi, Texas, and finally to Denton, Texas, where Bray attended high school. At the age of eighteen, three weeks after graduating high school, Bray was involved in a serious car accident. She had to undergo thirteen surgeries over six years to reconstruct her face, and has an artificial left eye because of the accident.

Bray graduated from the University of Texas at Austin in 1988 as a theater major. When her childhood best friend, who was living in Manhattan, called saying she was looking for a roommate, Bray moved to New York City.

Bray was married to Barry Goldblatt, a children's book agent, with whom she shares a son, Josh.

== Career ==
Bray's first job was in the publicity department of Penguin Putnam, followed by three years at Spier, an agency specializing in book advertising.

Bray was encouraged to write a young adult novel by her husband, a children's book agent, and Ginee Seo, an editor at Simon & Schuster. Before this, using a pseudonym, she had written three books for 17th Street Press.

Her first novel, A Great and Terrible Beauty, became a New York Times bestseller. In November 2006, a video promoting the book was a part of The Book Standard's Teen Book Video Awards. She wrote two more books to finish the Gemma Doyle Trilogy: Rebel Angels and The Sweet Far Thing.

Going Bovine was published by Delacorte in 2009 and won the Michael L. Printz Award from the American Library Association recognizing literary excellence in young adult literature. It is a dark comedy about a 16-year-old boy named Cameron who has mad cow disease. He and his friends, a 16-year-old hypochondriac video gamer with dwarfism named Gonzo and a punk angel named Dulcie who spray-paints her wings, go on a mission to cure Cameron's disease.

Beauty Queens, about a group of beauty pageant contestants whose plane crashes on an island, was published by Scholastic Press in May 2011.

Bray's novel, The Diviners, was published on September 18, 2012. It centers around Evie O'Neill, a seventeen-year-old with a special power who has been sent to live with her uncle in New York City in 1926. The sequel, Lair of Dreams, was released in August 2015 and the third book, Before The Devil Breaks You, was released in October 2017. The fourth and final book in the series, The King of Crows, was released in February 2020.

== Awards and honors ==
=== Awards ===
Year	Title	Award	Result	Ref.
2010	Going Bovine	Michael L. Printz Award	Winner	
2010	Going Bovine	Audie Award for Teen Title	Finalist	
2012	Beauty Queens	Audie Award for Narration by the Author	Winner	
2012	Beauty Queens	Audie Award for Teen Title	Finalist	
2013	The Diviners	Audie Award for Teen Title	Finalist	
2016	Lair of Dreams	Audie Award for Best Female Narrator	Finalist	
2016	Lair of Dreams	Audie Award for Young Adult Title	Winner	
2018	Before the Devil Breaks You	Audie Award for Young Adult Title	Finalist	

=== Honors ===
A Great and Terrible Beauty and The Sweet Far Thing received starred reviews from Publishers Weekly. Going Bovine received starred reviews from Booklist and Publishers Weekly. Before the Devil Breaks You and the audiobook renditions of Beauty Queens and The King of Crows received starred reviews from Booklist. The Diviners received starred reviews from Booklist, Kirkus Reviews, and Publishers Weekly. Lair of Dreams received starred reviews from Kirkus Reviews and Publishers Weekly.

A Great and Terrible Beauty, Rebel Angels, and The Sweet Far Thing were national bestsellers for children's fiction.

Year	Title	Honor	Ref.
2006	Rebel Angels	ALA Best Fiction for Young Adults	
2011	Beauty Queens	Booklist Editors' Choice: Media	
2012	Beauty Queens	Amazing Audiobooks for Young Adults	
2012	Beauty Queens	ALA Amelia Bloomer List	
2012	Beauty Queens	ALA Rainbow Book List	
2012	Beauty Queens	Booklist Best Fiction for Young Adults	
2012	Going Bovine	Popular Paperbacks for Young Adults	
2013	The Diviners	Amazing Audiobooks for Young Adults	
2013	The Diviners	ALA Best Fiction for Young Adults	
2016	Lair of Dreams	ALA Rainbow Book List	

== Publications ==
=== Gemma Doyle Trilogy ===
1. A Great and Terrible Beauty, Delacorte (2003)
2. Rebel Angels, Delacorte (2005)
3. The Sweet Far Thing, Delacorte (2007)

=== The Diviners series ===
1. The Diviners, Little, Brown Books for Young Readers (2012)
2. Lair of Dreams, Little, Brown Books for Young Readers (2015)
3. Before the Devil Breaks You, Little, Brown Books for Young Readers (2017)
4. The King of Crows, Little, Brown Books for Young Readers (2020)

=== Standalone novels ===
- Going Bovine, Delacorte (2009)
- Beauty Queens, Scholastic Press (2011)
- Under the Same Stars, Farrar, Straus and Giroux (2025)
- Radio Free Texas, Scholastic Press (2026)

=== Anthologized short stories ===
- "Primate the Prom", in 21 Proms, eds. David Levithan and Daniel Ehrenhaft, Scholastic Paperbacks (2007)
- "Bad Things", in The Restless Dead, ed. Deborah Noyes, Candlewick Press (2007)
- "Not Just for Breakfast Anymore", in Up All Night, HarperTeen, (2008)
- "Nowhere Is Safe", in Vacations from Hell, HarperTeen (2009)
- "The Thirteenth Step", in The Eternal Kiss: 13 Vampire Tales of Blood and Desire, ed. Trisha Telep, Running Press (2009)
- "The Last Ride of the Glory Girls", in Steampunk! An Anthology of Fantastically Rich and Strange Stories, Candlewick Press (2015)
