= History of Leicester City F.C. =

History of an English football club

This is the history of Leicester City Football Club, based in Leicester, England.

== Leicester Fosse (1884–1919) ==
The club was founded in 1884 as Leicester Fosse, so named because the team played on a field by the Fosse Road. Before moving to Filbert Street in 1891, the club played at five different grounds. The club joined the Football Association in 1890. It joined in the Midland League in 1891, and after finishing second was elected to the Second Division of the Football League in 1894. The first ever league game was a 4–3 defeat at Grimsby, but a week later at Filbert Street the club recorded its first league win against Rotherham. The club's largest win to date, 13–0 against Notts Olympic in a FA Cup qualifying game, was also recorded in that season.

In 1904, the club successfully re-applied for membership of the Football League. In 1908, the club finished as Second Division runners-up and reached the First Division but was relegated again after just one season. In 1909, the club recorded its worst ever defeat, a 12–0 drubbing against Nottingham Forest.

== Leicester City is born (1919–1939) ==
The club was re-elected to the Football League for the last time to date in 1915, when the League was suspended for four years due to a financial scandal and World War I. Leicester were playing in a regional league organised for Midlands clubs in this period. Due to financial problems, Leicester Fosse had ceased to exist when the League resumed in 1919. The club was reformed as Leicester City Football Club, particularly appropriate as the borough of Leicester had recently been granted city status.

In 1925, the club were champions of the Second Division under the management of Peter Hodge. Hodge's signings included Arthur Chandler, one of City's most famous players from this period, scoring a club record 273 goals between 1923 and 1935 and Adam Black, who has the club record for league appearances, 528. In 1929, the club recorded its highest ever finish in the Football League, finishing second to The Wednesday. The club's highest ever attendance was in 1928, 47,298 against Tottenham Hotspur into the FA Cup fifth round. The 1930s were less successful, with the club being relegated in 1935, although finishing first in the Second Division in 1937, only to be relegated from the First Division again in 1939. In 1939, the Football League was suspended due to the war, and just like in 1915–1919, City were forced along with other clubs to play in regional leagues.

== In and out of the top division (1949–1958) ==
City reached the FA Cup final for the first time in their history in 1949, losing 3–1 to Wolverhampton Wanderers. The club, however, was celebrating a week later when a draw on the last day of the season ensured survival in the Second Division. The 1950–51 season saw the signing of one of Leicester's greatest ever strikers, Arthur Rowley, from Fulham, who would become the club's top scorer in eight consecutive seasons. Rowley equalled Arthur Chandler's then club record of 38 goals in one season in the 1951–52 season, then broke it the following season, scoring 41 times. Thirty-nine of these came in the league, where he won the Second Division golden boot for the first time. Leicester won the Second Division championship in 1954 as Rowley netted 36 more. Although a woeful defensive record, conceding 86 goals, saw them relegated straight back down from the First Division the next season, they returned two years later in 1957, with Rowley breaking his own club record and scoring 44 goals in one season (this remains the club record still today) claiming the Second Division top scorer accolade once again. Although Leicester survived in their first season back in the First Division, Rowley was sensationally sold, just seven goals shy of Arthur Chandler's all-time record as the club's top goalscorer, to Shrewsbury Town at the end of 1957–58 season. The decision to sell him led to fan unrest and ultimately the sacking of David Halliday in November 1958.

== Matt Gillies (1958–1968) ==
Former player Matt Gillies took over from Halliday with the Foxes lying in the relegation zone of the First Division and would go on to become arguably the club's most successful ever manager. Gillies became well known for his ability to spot a good player during his time at Filbert Street bringing through the ranks future FWA Footballer of the Year winners Gordon Banks and Frank McLintock and future PFA Player of the Year Peter Shilton, as well as club favourites Dave Gibson, Lenny Glover and Graham Cross. Leicester reached the FA Cup final twice under the stewardship of Gillies in 1961 and 1963. In 1961, they were on the losing side to double winners Tottenham, and as a result were England's representatives in the 1961–62 European Cup Winners' Cup, in which Leicester were knocked out by eventual winners Atlético Madrid in the first round. In 1963, Leicester chased the double. The coldest winter for decades meant Leicester were forced to play a backlogged fixture list on ice, then went on a then club record 18-game unbeaten run, culminating in the club sitting atop the First Division on 16 April 1963, causing the press to label Leicester as the "ice kings". However, injuries (possibly feigned in light of the upcoming FA Cup final) eventually took their toll and Leicester took just one point from their final five games, seeing them fall to fourth position, though this was still the club's best post-war finish up until the 2015–16 season, where Leicester won the Premier League. They then lost the 1963 cup final 3–1 to Matt Busby's Manchester United.

Gillies finally won silverware though in 1964. Leicester beat Stoke City 4–3 on aggregate to win the League Cup for the first time. Leicester also reached the League Cup final the following year, losing to Chelsea. In 1966, one of the club's most famous players, Gordon Banks, who played for eight years at Leicester, represented England at the FIFA World Cup, where he helped England become world champions and was also nominated for the Ballon d'Or, for European Football of the Year, still to this date, the only Leicester player to be nominated for that award.

Leicester toured Zambia in the summer of 1968, playing six games and winning them all, including three games against the Zambian national team and three games against representative XI sides. City's visit was described as "probably the greatest occasion in the history of association football in Zambia" by Zambian president Kenneth Kaunda.

After a bad start to the season and a bout of illness, Matt Gillies resigned in November 1968. His successor, Frank O'Farrell, was unable to prevent relegation, but the club reached the FA Cup final, losing 1–0 to Manchester City. Their relegation in 1969 ended a twelve-year stint in the top flight, the club's longest to date.

== Jimmy Bloomfield (1971–1977) ==
In 1971, Leicester were promoted back to the First Division, and won the Charity Shield for the first time against Liverpool. Unusually, due to Division One champions Arsenal's commitments in European competition, Second Division winners Leicester were invited to play FA Cup winners Liverpool, beating them 1–0. Jimmy Bloomfield was appointed for the new season, and his team remained in the First Division for his tenure. It included popular players such as Keith Weller, Frank Worthington and Alan Birchenall, who continues to play a role at the club today, particularly well known for presenting half-time entertainment. Leicester reached the FA Cup semi-final in 1974. No period since Bloomfield has seen the club remain in the top division for so long.

== Up and down (1978–1991) ==
Frank McLintock, a noted player for seven years for Leicester successful period from the late 1950s to the mid-1960s, succeeded Jimmy Bloomfield in 1977. Due to City's relegation in at the end of the 1977–78 season and McClintock's subsequent resignation, he is regarded as one of Leicester's worst managers. Jock Wallace resumed the tradition of successful Scottish managers (after Peter Hodge and Matt Gillies) by steering Leicester to the Second Division championship in 1980. Unfortunately, Wallace was not able to keep Leicester in the First Division, but they reached the FA Cup semi-final in 1982. Under Wallace, one of City's most famous homegrown players, Gary Lineker, emerged into the first team squad. Leicester's next manager was Gordon Milne, who achieved promotion in 1983. Lineker helped Leicester maintain their place in the First Division but was sold to Everton in 1985 and two years later Leicester went down, having failed to find a suitable replacement. Milne had left in 1986 and was replaced by in 1987 David Pleat, who oversaw one of the club's most unsuccessful periods in its history. He was sacked in January 1991 after a defeat that left City fourth from bottom. Gordon Lee was put in charge of the club until the end of the season. Leicester won their final game of the season which guided them clear of relegation to the third tier of the Football League.

== The play-off battle (1991–1994) ==
Brian Little, who had just taken Darlington from the Conference to the Third Division with successive promotions, was given the manager's job at Leicester and in his first season they qualified for the promotion playoffs. Leicester beat Cambridge United 6–1 on aggregate in the semi-finals, but lost out on a place in the new Premier League after a 1–0 defeat in the playoff final to Blackburn Rovers – the only goal of the game was scored by Blackburn's Mike Newell, a former Leicester player. The goal, a penalty, came after a much-disputed foul by Steve Walsh on David Speedie. Speedie became the subject of much hatred amongst Leicester City supporters but signed for the club a year later.

Leicester suffered another playoff final defeat at the end of the 1992–93 Division One campaign. They managed to draw level with Swindon Town in the second half after trailing 3–0, only to concede another controversial penalty. In 1993–1994 it was third time lucky for Leicester as they beat East Midlands rivals Derby County 2–1 in the final to secure promotion to the Premiership after seven years outside the top division. Striker David Speedie was suspended for the final, having been sent off in the semi-final.

== Relegation and promotion (1994–1996) ==
Brian Little quit as Leicester manager the following November to take charge at Aston Villa, and his successor, Mark McGhee, was unable to save Leicester from finishing second from bottom in the 1994–95 Premiership campaign with just six wins from 42 league games. Leicester were flying high at the top of Division One when McGhee left the club unexpectedly in December 1995 to take charge at Wolverhampton Wanderers.

McGhee was replaced by Martin O'Neill, who prior to his brief six-month spell as Norwich City manager had taken Wycombe Wanderers from the Conference to Division Two with two successive promotions. Under O'Neill, Leicester qualified for the 1995–96 Division One promotion playoffs and beat Crystal Palace 2–1 with a last-gasp Steve Claridge goal which secured an immediate return to the Premiership. O'Neill was recognised for both his ability in the transfer market, signing players like Neil Lennon, Muzzy Izzet, Tony Cottee and Matt Elliott, and the performances he elicited from the team.

== Success in the top flight (1996–2000) ==
Leicester established themselves in the Premiership with four successive top ten finishes. O'Neill was the first manager to win silverware for 26 years, winning the League Cup twice, in 1997 and 2000, and Leicester were runners-up in 1999. This meant qualification for the UEFA Cup in 1997–98 and 2000–01, the club's first qualification for Europe since they played in the 1961–62 European Cup Winners' Cup. O'Neill became a sought-after manager, turning down Leeds United in 1999, but in June 2000 he was lured to Celtic. He is regarded today as one of the most successful managers in the club's history. In April 2000, the club received a record £11 million from Liverpool for striker Emile Heskey.

== Downfall and fightback (2000–2004) ==
Martin O'Neill was replaced by the former England under-21 national team coach Peter Taylor. For most of 2000–01, Leicester looked set to qualify for European competition, even topping the Premiership table for two weeks in October. However, they were then knocked out of the FA Cup quarter-finals by Division Two side Wycombe Wanderers, followed by nine defeats from their final ten Premiership fixtures which saw them slip to 13th in the table. A poor start to 2001–02 (a 5–0 defeat at home to newly promoted Bolton Wanderers) saw Taylor sacked after two months and replaced by David Bassett, who was unable to stop Leicester's season from going from bad to worse. In his 15 months at the club, Peter Taylor spent £23 million on transfer fees alone, by far the most of any Leicester manager at the time. Particularly notorious was the club record fee of £5 million for Ade Akinbiyi, who scored 11 goals in 58 league appearances, and Dennis Wise, £1.6 million for a 34-year-old who was later sacked for assaulting a teammate. Some also blame former chairman John Elsom for his poor handling of the club's finances. Just before relegation was confirmed, Bassett resigned to become director of football, to make way for his assistant Micky Adams, who had quit the manager's job at Brighton & Hove Albion six months earlier to become Bassett's assistant. Leicester's last game of the 2001–02 season was also their last at Filbert Street, beating Tottenham 2–1 to secure only their fifth Premiership win of the season.

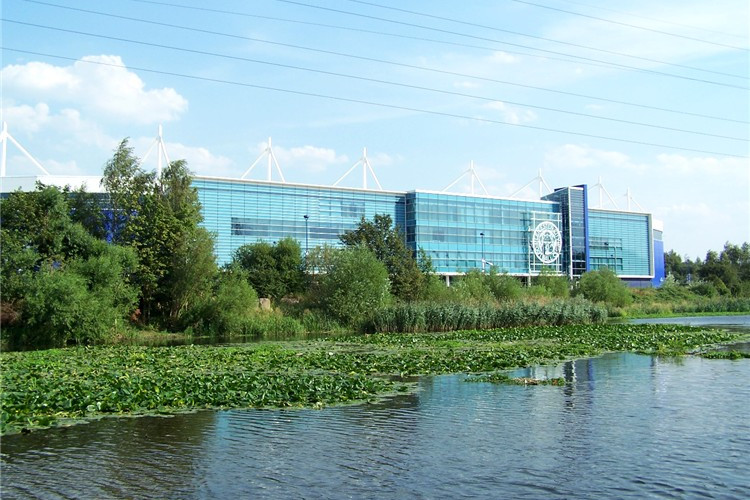
King Power Stadium from the Grand Union canal

Leicester moved into the new 32,000-seat Walkers Stadium at the start of the 2002–03 season. Walkers, the crisp manufacturers, the club's former shirt sponsors acquired the naming rights for a ten-year period. In October 2002, the club went into administration with debts of £30 million. Some of the reasons were the loss of TV money (ITV Digital, itself in administration, had promised money to Division One clubs for TV rights), the large wage bill, lower than expected fees for players transferred to other clubs and the £37 million cost of the new stadium. Adams was banned from the transfer market for most of the season, even after the club was rescued by a takeover in February 2003 by a consortium led by Gary Lineker. Adams guided Leicester to runners-up spot in Division One and automatic promotion back to the Premiership with 92 points. In reaction to Leicester's restructuring of their debts, the Football League changed their rules and now penalise teams going into administration with a ten-point penalty. There was some bitterness from other clubs over this point, and because Leicester retained some good players from the Premiership (although several were sold). In an interview in mid-2006, chairman Andrew Taylor stated debt was about £25 million, including a "mortgage" of £15–18 million on the Walkers Stadium to the company (not the club) that owns it. Leicester were relegated from the Premiership in 2003–04 with 33 points, along with Leeds United and Wolverhampton Wanderers. The Stadium was renamed King Power Stadium in 2011 after the take-over of Thai-based duty-free company King Power.

== Life in the Championship (2004–2008) ==
Adams resigned as manager in October 2004 and Dave Bassett began a second (albeit temporary) spell as manager assisted by former FA technical director Howard Wilkinson. The pair remained in charge at Leicester until Craig Levein was appointed Leicester City boss on Friday 29 October 2004, who had previously been manager of Hearts. Levein was unable to attain anything higher than a 15th-place finish in the final table, Leicester's lowest in 14 years. Their dismal form continued into the 2005–06 season, which saw some fans call for Levein's resignation as the team were near the bottom of the table after ten matches, and fell into the relegation zone in January, ultimately leading to his sacking on 25 January 2006, despite a 3–2 FA Cup win over Premiership club Tottenham just 17 days earlier.

After winning three out of four games as caretaker manager and moving the club five places up the league, Rob Kelly was appointed to see out the rest of the season. Kelly steered Leicester to safety and in April 2006 was given the manager's job on a permanent basis. Jim McCahill retired as chairman on 1 June 2006 and was replaced by Andrew Taylor.

The club was bought from the existing 55 shareholders by Milan Mandarić in February 2007. By this stage, they were mid-table in the Championship, too low to mount a promotion challenge but seemingly comfortably clear of relegation. A run of eight games without a win, however, plunged the club back to the fringes of the relegation battle, prompting Mandarić to sack Kelly on 11 April 2007. Nigel Worthington was appointed as manager for the remaining five games of the season, and under his management, a final position of 19th was achieved.

On 25 May, Martin Allen was given a three-year contract to be the new permanent manager. His relationship with Milan Mandarić, however, deteriorated rapidly, and he left the club on mutual consent in August after just three months at the helm. Jon Rudkin, Steve Beaglehole and Mike Stowell took over as caretaker managers until 13 September, when Gary Megson was installed as their new permanent manager. But the managerial story took another twist when he walked out on 24 October to take over from the sacked Sammy Lee at Bolton. Frank Burrows and Gerry Taggart temporarily took charge until Ian Holloway was appointed as Leicester's third permanent manager of the season on 22 October, after resigning from Plymouth Argyle.

== Relegation to League One and return to the Championship (2008–2014) ==
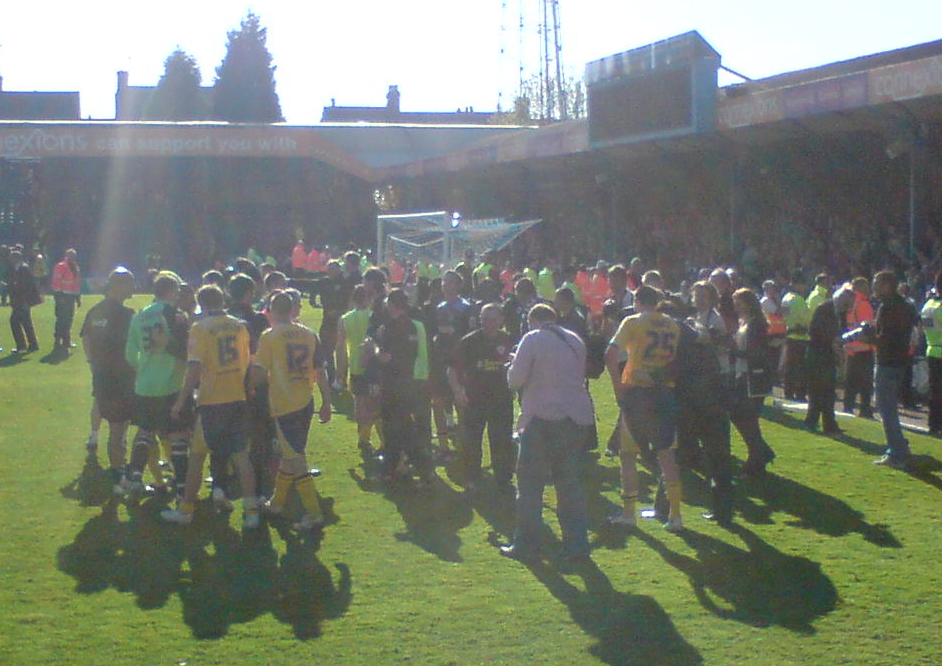
Leicester celebrate their promotion as champions of League One with a win at Southend.

On 4 May 2008, Leicester City's 0–0 draw with Stoke City was not enough to save the club from relegation due to other results going against them. This means that Leicester played in League One during the 2008–09 season, the first time that Leicester had played in the third tier of English football. Ian Holloway was sacked and replaced by Nigel Pearson, who led Leicester straight to the League One title, leading the division for much of the season and also going a club record 23 league games unbeaten. They clinched their return to the Championship with three games remaining in the season, defeating Southend United 2–0 on 18 April 2009. Matty Fryatt also netted 32 times this season, becoming the first Leicester player to score over 30 goals in one season since the legendary Arthur Rowley did so 52 years previously.

Leicester's first season back in the Championship was again a successful one under the stewardship of Pearson. Pearson showed his ambition at the beginning of the season by announcing his team would not just settle for consolidation and would be aiming straight for the play-offs. His ambitions proved to be warranted as the Foxes finished fifth in their first season back in the second tier and making the play-offs for the fifth time. They played Cardiff City in the semi-final and showed a fighting spirit to come from two goals down on aggregate to lead brief 3–2, though they ultimately lost via a penalty shoot-out. In the summer of 2010, however, Pearson left the club to become manager of Hull City.

Pearson was replaced by Paulo Sousa, who was sacked after just nine league games after a poor start and questions about player fitness and morale had left Leicester bottom of the league. On 3 October 2010, former England, Lazio and Benfica manager Sven-Göran Eriksson was announced as his replacement. He guided the club to an eventual 10th-place finish.

Leicester were favourites for promotion in the 2011–12 season, but on 24 October 2011, following an inconsistent start with the Foxes winning just five out of the first thirteen games, Eriksson left the club by mutual consent. Three weeks later, on 15 November 2011, Nigel Pearson was confirmed to be returning to the club as Eriksson's successor. In the 2012–13 season, Leicester struggled with play-off heartbreak as Anthony Knockaert had a 97th-minute penalty saved and Troy Deeney scored immediately at the other end. After an extremely successful 2013–14 season, Leicester finished first in the Championship with 102 points, securing automatic promotion to the 2014–15 Premier League.

== Return to the Premier League and first title (2014–present) ==
Leicester started their first season in the Premier League since 2004 with two draws in their first three games, then claimed their first Premier League win since May 2004 with a 1–0 win against Stoke City. They went on to beat Manchester United 5–3, coming back from 3–1 down, place in the table, five places ahead of Louis van Gaal's United.

By March, however, a dismal run of form had seen the team fall to last place with only 19 points (seven fewer than the 19th-placed team) from 29 games, but a change of fortunes meant that they finished the season in 14th place with a 5–1 victory over relegated Queens Park Rangers on the last day of the season. They thus completed, mathematically, the best escape from relegation ever seen in the Premier League as no team had previously had less than 20 points from 29 games and stayed up. Despite his success, Pearson was sacked in June 2015 after a breakdown in his relationship with the club's owners. He was replaced by former Chelsea manager Claudio Ranieri.

Starting the 2015–16 season as relegation candidates, and quoted by William Hill at 5,000–1, Leicester improbably went on to win the title in one of the most extraordinary seasons in English football. Under Ranieri, the team made a flying start to the season, losing only one game in their first 15 and topping the table in December ahead of Arsenal, Manchester City and Manchester United. Striker Jamie Vardy, who four years previously had been playing non-league football at Fleetwood Town, scored in 11-straight Premier League matches, beating the record of ten set by Ruud van Nistelrooy in 2003. Having been bottom of the table at Christmas 2014, Leicester were top at Christmas 2015. Their form continued into 2016, and in February they beat 2nd-placed Manchester City 3–1 away to go six points clear. For the remainder of the season, Leicester's main title rivals were Tottenham, and they clinched their first ever Premier League title, with two games to spare, on the weekend of 1–2 May when they drew 1–1 with Manchester United and Tottenham drew 2–2 with Chelsea. They also qualified for the UEFA Champions League for the first time.

=== Post 2016: FA Cup Victory ===
In February 2019, Leicester City announced the appointment of new manager Brendan Rodgers, previous manager of Celtic. In the 2020–21 season, Leicester qualified for the UEFA Europa League, and won the FA Cup for the first time.

=== Helicopter crash ===
Club owner Vichai Srivaddhanaprabha's helicopter crashed outside the King Power Stadium, shortly after taking off from the pitch on 27 October 2018. killing Srivaddhanaprabha and all four other people on board.

=== Relegation to League One ===
In April 2026, 10 years after winning their first league title, and one year after being relegated to the EFL Championship in 2025, Leicester were relegated to League One for the first time since the 2007–08 season, following a 1–0 defeat to Portsmouth and a 2–2 draw with Hull City on matchdays 43 and 44.
