= 2005–06 Leicester City F.C. season =

2005–06 season of Leicester City

Leicester City
2005–06 season
- Chairman: Jim McCahill
- Manager: Craig Levein (until 25 January); Rob Kelly (from 25 January)
- Stadium: Walkers Stadium
- Championship: 16th
- FA Cup: Fourth round
- League Cup: Fourth round
- Player of the Year: Joey Guðjónsson
- Top goalscorer: League: Iain Hume (9); All: Iain Hume/Joey Guðjónsson/Mark de Vries (9 each)
- Highest home attendance: 25,578 vs Reading (25 Mar 2006, Championship)
- Lowest home attendance: 7,386 vs Blackpool (20 Sep 2005, League Cup)
- Average home league attendance: 22,234
Home colours	Away colours

During the 2005–06 English football season, Leicester City F.C. competed in the Football League Championship.

== Season summary ==
In the 2005–06 season, Leicester's dismal form continued which saw some fans call for Levein's resignation as the team were near the bottom of the table after ten matches, and fell into the relegation zone in January, ultimately leading to his sacking on Wednesday 25 January 2006, despite a 3–2 FA Cup win over Premiership club Tottenham just 17 days earlier.

After winning three out of four games as caretaker manager and moving the club five places up the league, Rob Kelly was appointed to see out the rest of the season. Kelly steered Leicester to safety and in April 2006 was given the manager's job on a permanent basis. Jim McCahill retired as chairman on 1 June 2006 and was replaced by Andrew Taylor.

== Kit ==
Leicester City's kit was manufactured by English sports retailer JJB Sports and sponsored by Narborough-based bank Alliance & Leicester.

== Final league table ==
Pos	Team	Pld	W	D	L	GF	GA	GD	Pts
14	Plymouth Argyle	46	13	17	16	39	46	−7	56
15	Ipswich Town	46	14	14	18	53	66	−13	56
16	Leicester City	46	13	15	18	51	59	−8	54
17	Burnley	46	14	12	20	46	54	−8	54
18	Hull City	46	12	16	18	49	55	−6	52

Updated to match(es) played on 2 December 2011. Source: RSSSF
Rules for classification: 1) points; 2) goal difference; 3) number of goals scored.

Results summary

Overall								Home						Away					
Pld	W	D	L	GF	GA	GD	Pts	W	D	L	GF	GA	GD	W	D	L	GF	GA	GD
46	13	15	18	51	59	−8	54	8	9	6	30	25	+5	5	6	12	21	34	−13

Source: 2005-06 Football League Championship table

Results by round

Round	1	2	3	4	5	6	7	8	9	10	11	12	13	14	15	16	17	18	19	20	21	22	23	24	25	26	27	28	29	30	31	32	33	34	35	36	37	38	39	40	41	42	43	44	45	46
Ground	A	H	H	A	H	A	H	A	A	H	H	A	A	H	H	A	H	A	H	H	A	A	H	H	A	H	A	A	H	A	A	H	A	H	H	A	H	A	A	H	A	H	H	A	H	A
Result	L	W	D	D	L	D	W	L	D	L	D	D	W	L	W	D	D	L	D	W	L	L	D	D	L	L	L	L	L	L	W	W	W	D	D	L	W	W	W	D	L	W	L	D	W	L
Position	24	12	12	14	16	17	14	15	15	16	17	19	15	18	13	12	15	16	16	14	16	16	18	20	20	20	21	22	22	22	21	21	19	19	19	20	18	16	16	16	18	15	17	17	15	16

Source: 11v11.com: 2005-06 Leicester City results
A = Away; H = Home; W = Win; D = Draw; L = Loss

== Results ==
Leicester City's score comes first

=== Legend ===
Win	Draw	Loss

=== Football League Championship ===
Date	Opponent	Venue	Result	Attendance	Scorers
6 August 2005	Sheffield United	A	1–4	18,224	Connolly
9 August 2005	Stoke City	H	4–2	20,519	De Vries, Connolly (3)
13 August 2005	Ipswich Town	H	0–0	21,879	
20 August 2005	Crewe Alexandra	A	2–2	7,053	Tiatto, Guðjónsson (pen)
27 August 2005	Luton Town	H	0–2	22,048	
29 August 2005	Hull City	A	1–1	20,192	McCarthy
10 September 2005	Sheffield Wednesday	H	2–0	22,618	De Vries (2)
13 September 2005	Cardiff City	A	0–1	9,196	
17 September 2005	Wolverhampton Wanderers	A	0–0	24,726	
24 September 2005	Queens Park Rangers	H	1–2	20,148	Hammond
27 September 2005	Brighton & Hove Albion	H	0–0	20,296	
1 October 2005	Derby County	A	1–1	25,044	Hume
15 October 2005	Watford	A	2–1	16,224	De Vries, Kisnorbo
18 October 2005	Burnley	H	0–1	23,326	
23 October 2005	Coventry City	H	2–1	22,991	De Vries (2)
29 October 2005	Preston North End	A	0–0	13,904	
5 November 2005	Southampton	H	0–0	21,318	
19 November 2005	Burnley	A	0–1	12,592	
22 November 2005	Watford	H	2–2	18,856	Guðjónsson (2, 1 pen)
26 November 2005	Sheffield United	H	4–2	22,382	Hume (2), Smith, Hammond
3 December 2005	Leeds United	A	1–2	21,402	Guðjónsson (pen)
9 December 2005	Stoke City	A	2–3	11,129	Guðjónsson, Hammond
17 December 2005	Crewe Alexandra	H	1–1	24,873	Hume
26 December 2005	Millwall	H	1–1	22,520	Guðjónsson (pen)
28 December 2005	Reading	A	0–2	22,061	
31 December 2005	Norwich City	H	0–1	21,072	
2 January 2006	Crystal Palace	A	0–2	20,089	
14 January 2006	Sheffield Wednesday	A	1–2	25,398	Stearman
21 January 2006	Cardiff City	H	1–2	20,140	Fryatt
24 January 2006	Plymouth Argyle	A	0–1	12,591	
31 January 2006	Queens Park Rangers	A	3–2	11,785	Fryatt, Stearman, Hughes
4 February 2006	Wolverhampton Wanderers	H	1–0	21,385	Fryatt
11 February 2006	Brighton & Hove Albion	A	2–1	7,187	McCarthy, Hume
14 February 2006	Derby County	H	2–2	23,246	Hume, Maybury
18 February 2006	Leeds United	H	1–1	25,497	Hume
25 February 2006	Ipswich Town	A	0–2	24,861	
4 March 2006	Hull City	H	3–2	22,835	Hume, Guðjónsson (2)
11 March 2006	Luton Town	A	2–1	9,783	Fryatt, O'Grady
18 March 2006	Millwall	A	1–0	10,523	Hughes
25 March 2006	Reading	H	1–1	25,578	Hume
1 April 2006	Norwich City	A	1–2	24,718	Williams
7 April 2006	Crystal Palace	H	2–0	23,211	Welsh, Hughes
15 April 2006	Preston North End	H	1–2	21,865	Fryatt
17 April 2006	Coventry City	A	1–1	26,672	Stearman
22 April 2006	Plymouth Argyle	H	1–0	22,796	Fryatt
30 April 2006	Southampton	A	0–2	26,801	

=== FA Cup ===
Round	Date	Opponent	Venue	Result	Attendance	Goalscorers
R3	8 January 2006	Tottenham Hotspur	H	3–2	19,844	Hammond, Hughes, De Vries
R4	28 January 2006	Southampton	H	0–1	20,427	

=== League Cup ===
Round	Date	Opponent	Venue	Result	Attendance	Goalscorers
R1	23 August 2005	Bury	A	3–0	2,759	Hamill, Stearman, Guðjónsson (pen)
R2	20 September 2005	Blackpool	H	2–1	7,386	De Vries (2)
R3	26 October 2005	Cardiff City	A	1–0	8,727	Johansson
R4	30 November 2005	Bolton Wanderers	A	1–2	13,067	Williams

== Squad ==
Note: Flags indicate national team as defined under FIFA eligibility rules; some limited exceptions apply. Players may hold more than one non-FIFA nationality.

No.	Pos.	Nation	Player
1	GK	SCO	Rab Douglas
2	DF	IRL	Alan Maybury
3	DF	AUS	Patrick Kisnorbo
4	MF	SCO	Stephen Hughes
5	DF	IRL	Paddy McCarthy
6	MF	SCO	Gareth Williams
7	MF	GUI	Mohammed Sylla
8	FW	CAN	Iain Hume
11	DF	AUS	Danny Tiatto (captain)
12	FW	ENG	Matty Fryatt
13	GK	AUS	Paul Henderson
14	DF	ENG	Rufus Brevett (on loan from Plymouth Argyle)
15	DF	SWE	Nils-Eric Johansson
16	MF	ISL	Joey Guðjónsson

No.	Pos.	Nation	Player
17	DF	ENG	Richard Stearman
18	FW	GHA	Elvis Hammond
22	DF	IRL	Alan Sheehan
23	MF	SCO	Joe Hamill
24	DF	SWE	Patrik Gerrbrand
25	MF	SCO	Andy Welsh (on loan from Sunderland)
26	FW	ENG	Chris O'Grady
27	GK	IRL	Conrad Logan
28	FW	ENG	Louis Dodds
29	FW	ENG	Levi Porter
30	MF	AUS	James Wesolowski
32	DF	ENG	Jay Smedley
34	FW	ENG	Ashley Chambers

=== Left club during season ===
Note: Flags indicate national team as defined under FIFA eligibility rules; some limited exceptions apply. Players may hold more than one non-FIFA nationality.

No.	Pos.	Nation	Player
8	FW	IRL	David Connolly (to Wigan Athletic)
21	DF	SCO	Peter Canero (to Dundee United)
19	FW	ENG	Tommy Wright (to Barnsley)
12	DF	WAL	Peter Gilbert (to Sheffield Wednesday)
14	MF	ENG	Jason Wilcox (to Blackpool)

No.	Pos.	Nation	Player
9	FW	ENG	Dion Dublin (to Celtic)
10	FW	NED	Mark de Vries (on loan to SC Heerenveen)
31	FW	ENG	James Graham (Released)
21	MF	ENG	Ryan Smith (on loan from Arsenal)
20	MF	ENG	Lee Morris (to Yeovil Town)

=== 2005–06 backroom staff ===
- This section lists members of staff who were in Leicester's first team squad at any point during the 2005–06 season
- Asterisks indicate member of staff left mid-season

Position	Nationality	Name
Manager	(Scotland)	Craig Levein*
Assistant manager	(England)	Rob Kelly
First Team Coach	(Scotland)	Peter Houston*
First Team Coach	(Scotland)	Kenny Black*
Head physio	(England)	David Rennie
Academy manager	(England)	Jon Rudkin
Academy coach (Under 18s)	(England)	Steve Beaglehole
Academy coach (Under 16s)	(England)	Trevor Peake

== Statistics ==
=== Appearances, goals and cards ===
(Starting appearances + substitute appearances)

No.	Pos.	Name	League		FA Cup		League Cup		Total		Discipline	
No.	Pos.	Name	Apps	Goals	Apps	Goals	Apps	Goals	Apps	Goals	Yellow card	Red card
1	GK	(Scotland) Rab Douglas	32	0	2	0	1	0	35	0	3	0
2	DF	(Republic of Ireland) Alan Maybury	40	1	2	0	3	0	45	1	5	1
3	DF	(Australia) Patrick Kisnorbo	36+1	1	0+1	0	1+2	0	37+4	1	4	1
4	MF	(Scotland) Stephen Hughes	28+6	3	2	1	1+1	0	31+7	4	5	0
5	DF	(Republic of Ireland) Paddy McCarthy	37+1	2	2	0	2+2	0	41+3	2	12	2
6	MF	(Scotland) Gareth Williams	26+5	1	1	0	3	1	30+5	2	1	0
7	MF	(Guinea) Mohammed Sylla	24+4	0	0	0	1+1	0	25+5	0	5	0
8	FW	(Republic of Ireland) David Connolly	5	4	0	0	0	0	5	4	0	0
8	FW	(Canada) Iain Hume	28+9	9	1	0	0	0	29+9	9	5	0
9	FW	(England) Dion Dublin	15+6	0	0	0	2	0	17+6	0	2	0
10	FW	(Netherlands) Mark de Vries	20+9	6	1+1	1	3+1	2	24+11	9	5	0
11	DF	(Australia) Danny Tiatto	11+7	1	0	0	3	0	14+7	1	3	1
12	FW	(England) Matty Fryatt	18+1	6	0	0	0	0	18+1	6	1	0
12	DF	(Wales) Peter Gilbert	4+1	0	0	0	0	0	4+1	0	0	0
13	GK	(Australia) Paul Henderson	14+1	0	0	0	3	0	17+1	0	0	0
14	DF	(England) Rufus Brevett	0+1	0	0	0	0	0	0+1	0	0	0
14	MF	(England) Jason Wilcox	3+3	0	0	0	0+2	0	3+5	0	0	0
15	DF	(Sweden) Nils-Eric Johansson	39	0	2	0	4	1	45	1	6	0
16	MF	(Iceland) Joey Guðjónsson	40+2	8	2	0	4	1	46+2	9	12	0
17	DF	(England) Richard Stearman	31+3	3	2	0	3	1	36+3	4	5	0
18	FW	(Ghana) Elvis Hammond	15+18	3	1+1	1	3	0	19+19	4	1	0
21	MF	(England) Ryan Smith	10+7	1	2	0	0	0	12+7	1	5	0
22	DF	(Republic of Ireland) Alan Sheehan	2	0	0	0	1+1	0	3+1	0	0	1
23	MF	(Scotland) Joe Hamill	7+5	0	1	0	4	1	12+5	1	0	0
24	DF	(Sweden) Patrik Gerrbrand	14+3	0	1	0	2	0	17+3	0	1	0
25	MF	(Scotland) Andy Welsh	4+6	1	0	0	0	0	4+6	1	0	0
26	FW	(England) Chris O'Grady	0+13	1	0	0	0	0	0+13	1	2	0
30	MF	(Australia) James Wesolowski	3+2	0	0	0	0	0	3+2	0	0	0
34	FW	(England) Ashley Chambers	0	0	0	0	0+1	0	0+1	0	0	0

== Transfers ==
=== In ===
Date	Pos	Name	From	Fee	Notes
1 June 2005	MF	(Guinea) Mohammed Sylla	(Scotland) Celtic	Free transfer	
6 June 2005	GK	(Scotland) Rab Douglas	(Scotland) Celtic	Free transfer	
29 June 2005	GK	(Australia) Paul Henderson	(England) Bradford City	Free transfer	
1 July 2005	DF	(Sweden) Patrik Gerrbrand	(Sweden) Hammarby	£250,000	
6 July 2005	DF	(Sweden) Nils-Eric Johansson	(England) Blackburn Rovers	Free transfer	
26 July 2005	DF	(Wales) Peter Gilbert	(England) Plymouth Argyle	£200,000	
11 August 2005	MF	(Scotland) Joe Hamill	(Scotland) Hearts	Signed	
31 August 2005	FW	(Canada) Iain Hume	(England) Tranmere Rovers	£500,000	
31 August 2005	FW	(Ghana) Elvis Hammond	(England) Fulham	£225,000	
9 January 2006	FW	(England) Matty Fryatt	(England) Walsall	£750,000	

=== Out ===
Date	Pos	Name	To	Fee	Notes
1 June 2005	GK	(Canada) Lars Hirschfeld	(Norway) Tromsø	Free transfer	
1 July 2005	MF	(England) Jordan Stewart	(England) Watford	£125,000	
8 July 2005	DF	(England) Matt Heath	(England) Coventry City	£200,000	
14 July 2005	GK	(England) Ian Walker	(England) Bolton Wanderers	Free transfer	
1 August 2005	MF	(England) Stephen Dawson	(England) Mansfield Town	Free transfer	
2 August 2005	DF	(England) Chris Makin	(England) Reading	Free transfer	
5 August 2005	MF	(Northern Ireland) Keith Gillespie	(England) Sheffield United	Free transfer	
31 August 2005	FW	(Republic of Ireland) David Connolly	(England) Wigan Athletic	£2,000,000	
5 September 2005	DF	(Scotland) Peter Canero	(Scotland) Dundee United	Signed	
1 January 2006	FW	(England) Tommy Wright	(England) Barnsley	£50,000	
5 January 2006	DF	(Wales) Peter Gilbert	(England) Sheffield Wednesday	Free transfer	
27 January 2006	MF	(England) Jason Wilcox	(England) Blackpool	Free transfer	
30 January 2006	FW	(England) Dion Dublin	(Scotland) Celtic	Free transfer	
23 March 2006	MF	(Scotland) Scot Gemmill	(England) Oxford United	Free transfer	

Transfers in: ▼£1,925,000
Transfers out: ▲£2,375,000
Total spending: ▲£450,000

=== Loans in ===
Start date	End date	Pos.	Player	From club
30 September 2005	10 March 2006	MF	(England) Ryan Smith	(England) Arsenal
27 February 2006	1 May 2006	DF	(England) Rufus Brevett	(England) Plymouth Argyle
1 March 2006	1 May 2006	MF	(Scotland) Andy Welsh	(England) Sunderland

=== Loans out ===
Start date	End date	Pos.	Player	To club
18 August 2005	1 January 2006	FW	(England) Chris O'Grady	(England) Rushden & Diamonds
31 August 2005	31 December 2005	FW	(England) Tommy Wright	(England) Blackpool
24 December 2005	7 May 2006	GK	(Republic of Ireland) Conrad Logan	(England) Boston United
31 January 2006	31 May 2006	FW	(Netherlands) Mark de Vries	(Netherlands) SC Heerenveen
