= Leicester City F.C. in European football =

English club in European football

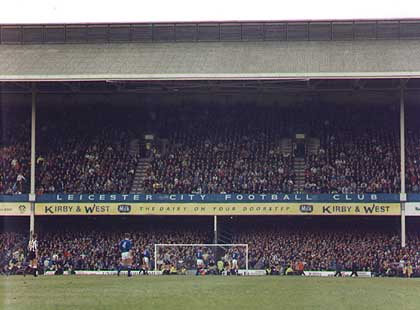
- Filbert Street, home to Leicester from 1891 to 2002. The club played here during three European campaigns.
- Club: Leicester City
- Seasons played: 6
- First entry: 1961–62 European Cup Winners' Cup
- Latest entry: 2021–22 UEFA Europa Conference League

Leicester City Football Club is an English football club based in Leicester, Leicestershire. The club was founded in 1884 and has competed in the English football league system since 1894. The 2016–17 UEFA Champions League was their fourth appearance in Europe, following campaigns in the European Cup Winners' Cup in 1961–62, and the UEFA Cup in 1997–98 and 2000–01. Leicester were eliminated by Atlético Madrid in three of their first four European appearances. The club have also entered the UEFA Europa Conference League, the Anglo-Italian Cup, the Anglo-Scottish Cup and the Texaco Cup.

== UEFA competitions ==
=== 1961–62 European Cup Winners' Cup ===
Leicester were beaten finalists in the 1961 FA Cup Final, losing 2–0 to Tottenham Hotspur. However, as Spurs had won the league as well as the FA Cup, they qualified for the 1961–62 European Cup, and Leicester took their Cup Winners' Cup place. Their preliminary round opposition were Glenavon, who became the first participant in the European Cup Winners' Cup to hail from Northern Ireland. A three-goal blast in ten minutes helped Leicester take the first leg at Windsor Park 4–1. Leicester won the second leg 3–1, sending them through to the first round.

Double Copa del Generalísimo-winning Atlético Madrid were the opposition. The home leg at Filbert Street finished 1–1. However Leicester lost 2–0 at the Estadio Metropolitano de Madrid, halting their progress. Atléti went on to win the tournament.

=== 1997–98 UEFA Cup ===
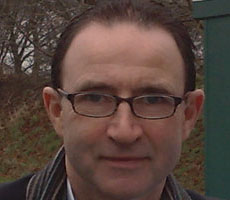
Martin O'Neill led Leicester to their first major European competition in 36 years.

Under Martin O'Neill, Leicester won the Football League Cup in 1996–97, beating Middlesbrough in the Final. This League Cup was the club's first silverware for 26 years, and it allowed Leicester to qualify for the UEFA Cup, their first major European competition in thirty-six years. English clubs Arsenal, Aston Villa and Liverpool also qualified.

The draw matched City up with Atlético Madrid. In Leicester's first major European tournament match since the clubs last met back in 1961, the Madrid club won the first leg 2–1, at their Vicente Calderón Stadium. Leicester lost the home tie 2–0 and the Midland club were eliminated. Juninho–who was in the Middlesbrough team beaten by City in the League Cup final–scored in both legs, while Ian Marshall was the sole Leicester goalscorer.

=== 2000–01 UEFA Cup ===
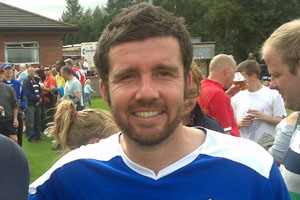
Muzzy Izzet scored Leicester's last UEFA Cup goal in 2000. He was the last Leicester player to score in a European competition until 14 September 2016, when Marc Albrighton scored against Club Brugge in the UEFA Champions League.

O'Neill's Leicester side won the League Cup again in 1999–2000, this time beating Tranmere Rovers in the Final, the last to be held at the old Wembley Stadium. This saw Leicester awarded a place in the UEFA Cup, alongside fellow English clubs Chelsea and Liverpool. However, O'Neill left Leicester for the manager's job at Celtic on 1 June 2000, and was replaced on 12 June by Peter Taylor. According to Stephen Wagg in the December 2001 issue of When Saturday Comes: "By contrast [to O'Neill], Taylor was gauchely optimistic". Speaking on BBC Radio Leicester in the summer of 2000, Taylor opined "I've looked around the other squads in the Premiership, and I can only think of six that are stronger than ours. I think we’ve got a good chance of getting into Europe".

The Foxes drew Red Star Belgrade in the first round. Alarm bells in England rang almost immediately, owing to a general election in FR Yugoslavia scheduled the same week as Leicester's planned visit to Belgrade, with the Foreign Office fearing "civil unrest". David Davies, then chief executive of the Football Association, termed the situation as "very delicate". BBC Sport succinctly referred to the situation as a "nightmare trip". Amid media reports of their withdrawal from the tournament, the Foxes made the decision to request a venue change, following a similar move the season before when Leeds United faced Red Star's eternal rivals Partizan in Heerenveen, the Netherlands. Despite an appeal from Red Star, UEFA elected to stage the game at a neutral ground, a week later than originally planned.

The first leg was a 1–1 draw with Gerry Taggart cancelling out Milenko Ačimovič's early opener–clocked at 47 seconds by Reuters, who called it "one of the fastest goals in UEFA Cup history". To attempt to counter the away goal the opposition had scored and seal the tie in the second leg, Taylor had planned to start Stan Collymore, however a poor performance in the televised match against Everton the previous Sunday saw him dropped. The second leg, held at the Gerhard Hanappi Stadium in Austria–home to Vienna club Rapid–finished 3–1 to the 'home' side, with Muzzy Izzet scoring Leicester's goal. A dreadful start to the following season saw Taylor sacked on 30 September 2001.

=== 2016–17 UEFA Champions League ===
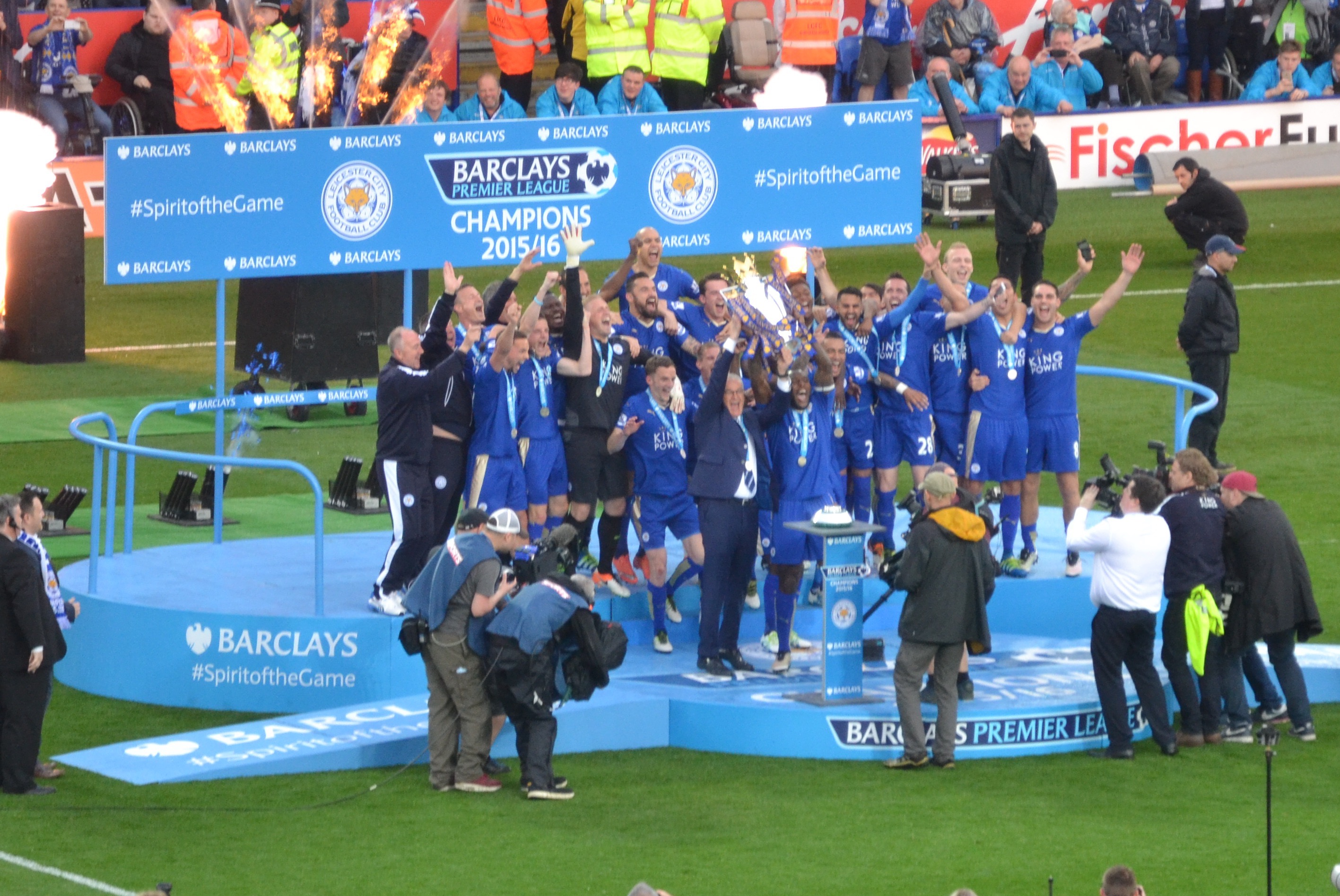
Leicester sealed their first Champions League qualification en route to the 2015–16 title.

On 9 April 2016, Leicester City, who were placed first in the league, secured a Champions League group stage spot, and on 2 May 2016 clinched their first national league title. Therefore, they were seeded for the group stage draw due to the Premier League being among Europe's top eight leagues.

The draw was made on 25 August 2016 and they were drawn in Group G with Porto, Club Brugge, and Copenhagen. Leicester City's first-ever match in the European Cup was played on 14 September 2016. Marc Albrighton scored City's first-ever goal in the competition with Riyad Mahrez adding 2 more for the 3–0 victory away to Belgian champions Club Brugge.

In their first home game at the European Cup, on 27 September 2016, Leicester beat Porto 1–0 with Islam Slimani scoring the only goal with a header. On 18 October 2016, the Foxes made it three out of three with a 1–0 win at home against the Danish champions Copenhagen. The goal was scored in the first half by Riyad Mahrez. The reverse fixture against Copenhagen was played on 2 November 2016 and remained goalless with Kasper Schmeichel making a vital save in the last minute. Leicester secured the first place in the group and a place in the next round with a comfortable 2–1 win against Club Brugge on 22 November 2016, Shinji Okazaki and Riyad Mahrez were the scorers while José Izquierdo netted the first-ever goal against the Foxes in the European Cup. In the last game of the group stage, on 7 December 2016, City lost catastrophically to Porto, conceding five goals. André Silva scored twice, once from the penalty spot, with Jesús Corona, Yacine Brahimi and Diogo Jota adding one goal each.

As Group G winners, Leicester were seeded for the next round draw, which took place on 12 December 2016. City got Spanish side Sevilla, the Group H runners-up. The first leg was played in Spain and was scheduled for 22 February 2017, Leicester lost 1–2, the scorers for Sevilla were Pablo Sarabia and Joaquín Correa, while Jamie Vardy netted for the Foxes in the 73rd minute for a vital away goal. The second leg was played on 14 March 2017. Leicester won 2–0 courtesy of goals from Wes Morgan and Marc Albrighton. Kasper Schmeichel saved a penalty from Steven Nzonzi with ten minutes to go, sealing the win. This meant Leicester advanced to the quarter-finals.

The draw for the Champions League quarter-finals was held on 17 March 2017, and Leicester were drawn against the last season's runners-up – Atlético Madrid. The first leg was played on 12 April and City lost 0–1, following a controversial penalty, scored by Antoine Griezmann. The second leg, played on 18 April, finished 1–1. Saúl opened the scoring, but his goal was cancelled out by Jamie Vardy. This result subsequently saw Leicester exit the Champions League as quarter-finalists, with the aggregate finishing 1–2 to Atlético Madrid on the night.

=== 2020–21 UEFA Europa League ===
Leicester finished 5th in the 2019–20 Premier League, so they qualified for Europe for the first time since 2016–17, entering the Europa League in the group stage. On 5 October 2020, they were drawn against Braga, AEK Athens and Zorya Luhansk in the group stages. The Foxes secured qualification to the knockout phase with two games to spare. Leicester sealed top spot in the group, and with it seeding for the next round's draw, in the 2–0 victory at home to AEK in the final Group G game.

Leicester drew Slavia Prague in the Round of 32, and registered a goalless draw away from home in the first leg. Leicester lost 0–2 at home in the second leg, and were thus eliminated from the tournament 0–2 on aggregate.

=== 2021–22 UEFA Europa League and Europa Conference League ===
In the 2021-22 season, Leicester City were drawn into Europa League Group C with SSC Napoli, Legia Warszawa, and Spartak Moskva. Going into the final game against Napoli on 9 December 2021, Leicester needed a win to go through to the knockout stages. Following a loss, they finished 3rd in Group C and were drawn into the knockout stages of the UEFA Europa Conference League against Randers FC. On 17 February 2022 they won over Randers, on 24 February they won over Randers 2 to 7 on aggregate. On 10 March they won over Rennes, on 17 March they lost to Rennes but won 3-2 on aggregate. In the next round, they faced PSV. In the first leg, they drew 0-0, while winning the second leg 1-2 to advance to the semifinals against AS Roma. In the first leg, they drew 1-1, but were then knocked out of Europe following a 1-0 loss.

== Minor trophies ==
=== Anglo-Italian Cup ===
Leicester appeared three times in the Anglo-Italian Cup, which was held between teams from Italy and England which had not qualified for European competitions. Leicester's first appearance in 1972 saw them play against Cagliari and Atalanta, losing their away games and winning their home matches. Under the tournament format, the English and Italian teams were ranked in separate tables according to their results - Leicester finished 3rd of the 6 English teams and were eliminated. The tournament was cancelled in 1973, but revived for four seasons from 1992–93. Leicester competed in the first two editions of the revived tournament, but were eliminated in the preliminary rounds both times. In 1992–93, they defeated Grimsby Town but lost to Newcastle United; in 1993–94, they were defeated by Peterborough United and lost to West Bromwich Albion.

=== Texaco and Anglo-Scottish Cups ===
The Foxes entered the Texaco Cup, which ran for five seasons, twice. In 1972–73 they eliminated Dundee United in a penalty shoot-out after two draws. Leicester were pitted against Norwich City for the second round. After both legs finished 2–0 to the respective home teams after extra time, Norwich progressed by winning the penalty shoot-out 4–3. The next season, Leicester progressed past Ayr United drawing 1–1 in Scotland and winning 2–0 at home; in the second round, Dundee United gained revenge for the previous year's elimination, winning 1–0 in Dundee and holding Leicester to a 1–1 draw in England.

After Texaco dropped their sponsorship of the tournament, the Anglo-Scottish Cup was created in the 1975–76 season, using a group stage format in which each team would play the others in the group once, with only the team finishing top of the group progressing. Leicester were in Group 2 of the English Qualifiers, with Hull City, Mansfield Town and West Bromwich Albion. Inconsistency ensured that City would not progress as they registered one win, one draw and one loss.

== Overall record ==
=== Record by competition ===
As of 5 May 2022.

Competition	Pld	W	D	L	GF	GA	GD	Best performance
UEFA Champions League	10	5	2	3	11	10	+1	Quarter-final (2016–17)
European Cup Winners' Cup	4	2	1	1	8	5	+3	First round (1961–62)
UEFA Cup/UEFA Europa League	18	6	5	7	29	26	+3	Round of 32 (2020–21)
UEFA Europa Conference League	8	4	2	2	10	5	+5	Semi-final (2021–22)
Total	40	17	10	13	58	46	+12	

=== Record by nation ===
Nation	Pld	W	D	L	GF	GA	GD	Opponents
Belgium	2	2	0	0	5	1	+4	Club Brugge
Czech Republic	2	0	1	1	0	2	-2	Slavia Prague
Denmark	4	3	1	0	8	2	+6	Copenhagen, Randers
France	2	1	0	1	3	2	+1	Rennes
Greece	2	2	0	0	4	1	+3	AEK Athens
Italy	4	0	2	2	5	7	-2	Napoli, Roma
Netherlands	2	1	1	0	2	1	+1	PSV Eindhoven
Northern Ireland	2	2	0	0	7	2	+5	Glenavon
Poland	2	1	0	1	3	2	+1	Legia Warsaw
Portugal	4	2	1	1	8	8	0	Braga, Porto
Russia	2	1	1	0	5	4	+1	Spartak Moscow
Spain	8	1	2	5	6	11	-5	Atlético Madrid, Sevilla
Ukraine	2	1	0	1	3	1	+2	Zorya Luhansk
FR Yugoslavia	2	0	1	1	2	4	-2	Red Star Belgrade

=== List of matches ===
Leicester City scores listed first.

Season	Competition	Round	Opposition	Home	Away	Agg.
1961–62	European Cup Winners' Cup	Preliminary round	(Northern Ireland) Glenavon	3–1	4–1	7–2
1961–62	European Cup Winners' Cup	First round	(Spain) Atlético Madrid	1–1	0–2	1–3
1997–98	UEFA Cup	First round	(Spain) Atlético Madrid	0–2	1–2	1–4
2000–01	UEFA Cup	First round	(Federal Republic of Yugoslavia) Red Star Belgrade	1–1	1–3 (Note: 'Away' leg held at the Gerhard Hanappi Stadium, Vienna, Austria)	2–4
2016–17	UEFA Champions League	Group G	(Portugal) Porto	1–0	0–5	1st
2016–17	UEFA Champions League	Group G	(Belgium) Club Brugge	2–1	3–0	1st
2016–17	UEFA Champions League	Group G	(Denmark) Copenhagen	1–0	0–0	1st
2016–17	UEFA Champions League	Round of 16	(Spain) Sevilla	2–0	1–2	3–2
2016–17	UEFA Champions League	Quarter-finals	(Spain) Atlético Madrid	1–1	0–1	1–2
2020–21	UEFA Europa League	Group G	(Portugal) Braga	4–0	3–3	1st
2020–21	UEFA Europa League	Group G	(Greece) AEK Athens	2–0	2–1	1st
2020–21	UEFA Europa League	Group G	(Ukraine) Zorya Luhansk	3–0	0–1	1st
2020–21	UEFA Europa League	Round of 32	(Czech Republic) Slavia Prague	0–2	0–0	0–2
2021–22	UEFA Europa League	Group C	(Italy) Napoli	2–2	2–3	3rd
2021–22	UEFA Europa League	Group C	(Poland) Legia Warsaw	3–1	0–1	3rd
2021–22	UEFA Europa League	Group C	(Russia) Spartak Moscow	1–1	4–3	3rd
2021–22	UEFA Conference League	Knockout round play-offs	(Denmark) Randers	4–1	3–1	7–2
2021–22	UEFA Conference League	Round of 16	(France) Rennes	2–0	1–2	3–2
2021–22	UEFA Conference League	Quarter-finals	(Netherlands) PSV Eindhoven	0–0	2–1	2–1
2021–22	UEFA Conference League	Semi-finals	(Italy) Roma	1–1	0–1	1–2
