= Patrik Gerrbrand =

Swedish footballer

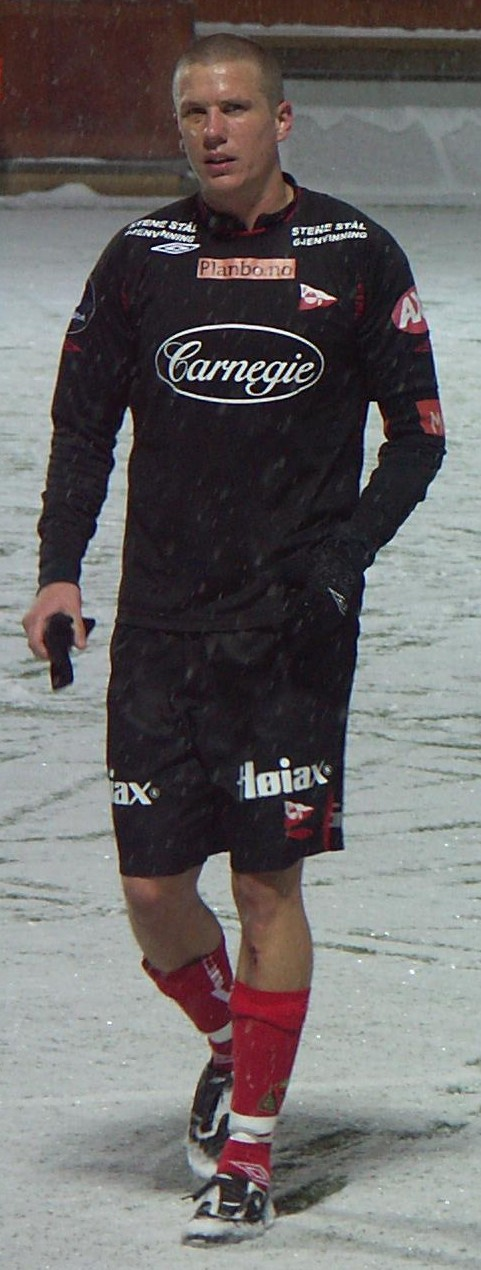

Personal information
- Full name: Mikael Patrik Gerrbrand
- Date of birth: 27 April 1981 (age 45)
- Place of birth: Älvsjö, Sweden
- Height: 1.87 m (6 ft 2 in)
- Position: Defender

Youth career
- Älvsjö AIK
- Hammarby

Senior career*
Years	Team	Apps	(Gls)
2000–2005	Hammarby	65	(2)
2005–2006	Leicester City	17	(0)
2006–2009	Fredrikstad	59	(1)
2009–2011	Hammarby	29	(3)
2012–2015	Nacka FF	39	(2)
Total		209	(8)

International career
2003–2004	Sweden U21	7	(0)

Managerial career
- 2013–2015: Nacka FF (player-coach)
- * Club domestic league appearances and goals as of 15 June 2012

Mikael Patrik "Totte" Gerrbrand (born 27 April 1981) is a Swedish former professional footballer who played as a defender. Starting off his career with Hammarby IF in 2000, he went on to also represent Leicester City and Fredrikstad before retiring at Nacka FF in 2015. A youth international for Sweden, he appeared seven times for the Sweden U21 team between 2003 and 2004.

== Club career ==
A central defender, Gerrbrand began playing football for Älvsjö AIK before heading to Hammarby as at 14 years of age. He played through the youth ranks before making his professional debut in 2000, and played for five more seasons, winning the Swedish Allsvenskan in 2001. In July 2005, he signed for Leicester City, making 21 appearances in all competitions for the Championship side during the 2005–06 season.

Gerrbrand signed for the Norwegian club in July 2006, transferring from Leicester City because he did not have a future for the first-team. He signed a three-and-a-half-year contract with Fredrikstad. He played most of Fredikstad's games until the 2009 season, where he only played in two of their first thirteen games and was released by mutual consent on 15 June 2009.

Just a few days after he left FFK, he signed for his youth and favourite club Hammarby IF. He signed a two-and-a-half-year contract with "Bajen".

== International career ==
Gerrbrand made seven appearances for the Swedish under-21 team, but never appeared in a senior international match. He was a part of Sweden's squad at the 2004 UEFA European Under-21 Championship, in which he played in four games as Sweden finished fourth.

== Honours ==
Hammarby IF

- Allsvenskan: 2001

Fredrikstad

- Norwegian Cup: 2006
