= Northern Ireland football clubs in European competitions =

Irish League football clubs have participated in European football competitions since 1957, when in the 1957–58 season, Glenavon took part in the European Cup – the first Irish League club to do so. In total, 16 clubs have represented Northern Ireland in European competition.

== History ==
As of the 2020–21 season, the NIFL Premiership champions qualify for the UEFA Champions League. The runners-up, the Europa League play-off winners and the Irish Cup winners qualify for the UEFA Europa Conference League. If, however, the cup winners have already qualified for Europe by finishing first or second in the league, the Europa Conference League place goes to the league's third-placed club.

Only the league champions have ever represented the Irish League in the European Cup/Champions League. Glenavon were the first team ever to represent Northern Ireland in any of the four competitions, when in the first round of the 1957–58 European Cup they played out a 0–0 draw against Danish side AGF in Aarhus, Denmark on 11 September 1957. They played the home leg two weeks later, losing 3–0. In the 1959–60 season, Linfield became the first Irish League club to win a match in the competition, in what was their first ever European Cup match. They defeated Swedish side Göteborg 2–1 at Windsor Park on 9 September 1959, however two weeks later they lost the away leg 6–1 which meant that they lost the tie 7–3 on aggregate. Linfield hold the record of the most participations in the European Cup/Champions League by any Northern Irish club to date, having appeared in 27 seasons of the competition up to and including 2012–13.

Participation in the secondary competitions began with Glentoran in the 1962–63 Inter-Cities Fairs Cup against Spanish side Real Zaragoza. A 2–0 defeat in the first leg at the Oval was followed by a 6–2 defeat away from home in the second leg. They lost the tie 8–2 on aggregate. Glentoran hold the record of the most participations in the Inter-Cities Fairs Cup/UEFA Cup/UEFA Europa League by any Northern Irish club to date, having appeared in 21 seasons of the competition. They also hold the record of the most appearances by a Northern Irish club in European competitions overall, having appeared in 42 seasons up to and including 2013–14 – one season more than Linfield who have made 41 appearances.

In 1960, Glenavon were drawn to face East German side Wismut in the first round of the 1960–61 European Cup. However, they were forced to withdraw when they were refused visas for East Germany and Wismut were refused visas for the UK. UEFA had allowed the matches to take place in neutral countries but that was not financially viable for Glenavon, so they were left with no option but to withdraw. A similar issue arose the following season when in the first round of the 1961–62 European Cup, Linfield were drawn to face another East German team, Vorwärts. The away leg was played, which Linfield lost 3–0. However, Vorwärts were denied visas for the UK to play the second leg, and similarly to Glenavon the previous season, travelling to play the game in a neutral country was not financially viable for Linfield so they were also forced to withdraw from the competition.

In 1965, Derry City became the first Northern Irish club to win a two-legged European tie. In the 1965–66 European Cup, the club's last ever appearance in European competition as an Irish League club, they defeated Lyn 8–6 on aggregate in a high-scoring tie. In the second round, they faced Anderlecht from Belgium but suffered a huge 9–0 loss in the away leg and later withdrew from the competition before the second leg was played, when the Irish Football Association ruled that their home ground was not up to standard. In 1972, the club withdrew from senior Northern Irish football and after 13 years of playing amateur football in lower leagues, they joined the League of Ireland in the Irish Republic in 1985.

In 1969, both Coleraine and Glentoran entered the Inter-Cities Fairs Cup, the first time more than one Northern Irish club had ever been entered into the same European competition. Glentoran lost in the first round, but Coleraine impressively got through to the second round. The two most notable successes in Europe are Linfield reaching the quarter-finals of the 1966–67 European Cup and Glentoran reaching the quarter-finals of the 1973–74 European Cup Winners' Cup.

In 1976, Irish League B Division club Carrick Rangers won the Irish Cup by defeating strong favourites Linfield 2–1 in the final. This qualified them to take part in European competition for the first, and to date only time – in the 1976–77 European Cup Winners' Cup. They defeated Aris from Luxembourg 4–3 on aggregate in the first round, before going out 9–3 on aggregate to English side Southampton in the second round. To date, this is the only occasion that a club from outside the top division of football in Northern Ireland has represented the country in European competition.

The 1993–94 UEFA Champions League saw Linfield drawn to face Dynamo Tbilisi of Georgia in the preliminary round. After losing 3–2 on aggregate, they were reinstated when their opponents were expelled from the competition for allegedly attempting to bribe match officials. Linfield then went on to face Copenhagen in the first round proper. They won the first leg 3–0, but lost the second leg 4–0 after extra time. This proved costly, as victory would have meant a financially lucrative tie against eventual champions Milan in the next round. In July 2013, Linfield became the first Northern Irish club to win both the home leg and the away leg of a European tie. In the 2013–14 UEFA Europa League first qualifying round they were drawn to face ÍF Fuglafjørður from the Faroe Islands. They won the away leg 2–0 and then won the home leg 3–0 at Windsor Park to complete a comfortable 5–0 aggregate victory. In the second qualifying round they were drawn to face Skoda Xanthi of Greece and won the first leg 1–0 away from home despite being massive underdogs for the tie. This made it three consecutive victories in Europe for the club, without conceding a goal in the process – another first for a Northern Irish club. However, in the second leg at home they went down 2–1 after extra time, which eliminated them on the away goals rule.

In the 2019-20 UEFA Europa League, Linfield progressed to the Play-Off Round, defeating Azerbaijani champions Qarabag 3–2 at Windsor Park to get within one game of becoming the first ever Irish League club to qualify for the group stage of a UEFA competition. However they lost the second leg 2–1 in Baku, and were eliminated on the away goals rule.

== Statistics ==
As of 26 August 2022

European Cup / UEFA Champions League

- First game played: AGF 0–0 Glenavon, 11 September 1957 (1957–58 European Cup first round, first leg)
- Most competitions appeared in: 33 – Linfield
- Most games played: 78 – Linfield
- Most wins: 11 – Linfield
- Most draws: 23 – Linfield
- Most defeats: 44 – Linfield

Inter-Cities Fairs Cup / UEFA Cup / UEFA Europa League

- First match played: Glentoran 0–2 Real Zaragoza, 26 September 1962 (1962–63 Inter-Cities Fairs Cup first round, first leg)
- Most competitions appeared in: 23 – Glentoran
- Most games played: 50 – Glentoran
- Most wins: 15 – Linfield
- Most draws: 9 – Glentoran / Linfield
- Most defeats: 36 – Glentoran

UEFA Europa Conference League

- First match played: Glentoran 1–1 The New Saints, 8 July 2021 (2021–22 UEFA Europa Conference League first qualifying round, first leg)
- Most competitions appeared in: 2 – Larne / Linfield
- Most games played: 8 – Larne
- Most wins: 4 – Larne
- Most draws: 3 – Linfield
- Most defeats: 2 – Cliftonville / Crusaders / Larne / Linfield

UEFA Cup Winners' Cup / European Cup Winners' Cup

- First match played: Glenavon 1–4 Leicester City, 13 September 1961 (1961–62 European Cup Winners' Cup preliminary round, first leg)
- Most competitions appeared in: 9 – Glentoran
- Most games played: 22 – Glentoran
- Most wins: 3 – Glentoran
- Most draws: 7 – Glentoran
- Most defeats: 12 – Glentoran

UEFA Intertoto Cup

- First match played: Cliftonville 0–3 Standard Liège, 22 June 1996 (1996 UEFA Intertoto Cup group stage)
- Most competitions appeared in: 3 – Cliftonville
- Most games played: 10 – Cliftonville
- Most wins: 2 – Newry Town
- Most draws: 2 – Cliftonville
- Most defeats: 7 – Cliftonville

Overall

- First match played: AGF 0–0 Glenavon, 11 September 1957 (1957–58 European Cup first round, first leg)
- Most competitions appeared in: 55 – Linfield
- Most games played: 137 – Linfield
- Most wins: 29 – Linfield
- Most draws: 35 – Linfield
- Most defeats: 73 – Linfield
- Biggest winning margin (match): 5 goals, joint record:
  - Linfield 6–1 Aris (1966–67 European Cup first round)
  - Coleraine 5–0 Sant Julià (2002 UEFA Intertoto Cup first round)
- Biggest winning margin (aggregate): 5 goals, joint record:
  - Linfield 9–4 Aris (1966–67 European Cup first round)
  - Coleraine 7–2 Sant Julià (2002 UEFA Intertoto Cup first round)
  - Linfield 5–0 ÍF Fuglafjørður (2013–14 UEFA Europa League first qualifying round)
- Heaviest defeat (match): 11 goals – Dinamo Bucharest 11–0 Crusaders (1973–74 European Cup first round)
- Heaviest defeat (aggregate): 13 goals, joint record:
  - Ards 1–14 PSV Eindhoven (1974–75 European Cup Winners' Cup first round)
  - Glentoran 1–14 Ajax (1975–76 UEFA Cup first round)

=== UEFA coefficient and ranking ===
For the 2022–23 UEFA competitions, the associations will be allocated places according to their 2021 UEFA country coefficients, which will take into account their performance in European competitions from 2016–17 to 2020–21. In the 2021 rankings used to allocate berths for the 2022–23 European competitions, Northern Ireland's coefficient points total will be 6.958. After earning a score of 2.833 during the 2020–21 European campaign, Northern Ireland will remain as the 42nd best association in Europe out of 55 for the second consecutive season.

Rank	Nation	Points
40	Latvia	7.375
41	Albania	7.250
42	Northern Ireland	6.958
43	Georgia	6.875
44	Finland	6.875

- Full list

== Appearances in UEFA competitions ==
As of 26 August 2022

Club	UEFA Champions League					UEFA Europa League (including Inter-Cities Fairs Cup)					UEFA Europa Conference League					UEFA Cup Winners' Cup					UEFA Intertoto Cup					Total				
Club	Apps	P	W	D	L	Apps	P	W	D	L	Apps	P	W	D	L	Apps	P	W	D	L	Apps	P	W	D	L	Apps	P	W	D	L
Linfield	33	78	11	23	44	17	47	15	9	23	2	6	1	3	2	3	6	2	0	4	0	0	0	0	0	55	137	29	35	73
Glentoran	12	28	3	7	18	23	50	5	9	36	1	2	0	1	1	9	22	3	7	12	0	0	0	0	0	45	102	11	24	67
Crusaders	6	14	1	2	11	11	26	6	4	16	1	4	1	1	2	3	6	0	2	4	0	0	0	0	0	21	50	8	9	33
Coleraine	1	2	0	0	2	12	29	4	8	17	1	2	0	0	2	4	8	0	1	7	1	4	1	1	2	19	45	5	10	30
Glenavon	1 (Note: Glenavon qualified for both the 1957–58 European Cup and the 1960–61 European Cup but withdrew from the 1960–61 competition when both clubs were refused visas to enter each other's countries, and it was not financially viable for Glenavon to play the matches in neutral countries.)	2	0	1	1	10	20	2	2	16	0	0	0	0	0	5	10	1	3	6	1	2	0	1	1	17	34	3	7	24
Portadown	3	6	0	1	5	11	28	3	7	18	0	0	0	0	0	1	2	1	0	1	0	0	0	0	0	15	36	4	8	24
Cliftonville	3	6	0	1	5	7	20	4	4	12	1	2	0	0	2	1	2	0	0	2	3	10	1	2	7	15	40	5	7	28
Ballymena United	0	0	0	0	0	3	8	2	1	5	0	0	0	0	0	4	8	0	0	8	1	2	0	1	1	8	18	2	2	14
Ards	1	2	0	0	2	1	2	1	0	1	0	0	0	0	0	2	4	0	1	3	1	4	0	0	4	5	12	1	1	10
Lisburn Distillery	1	2	0	1	1	1	2	0	0	2	0	0	0	0	0	1	2	0	0	2	2	4	0	0	4	5	10	0	1	9
Bangor	0	0	0	0	0	1	2	0	0	2	0	0	0	0	0	2	4	0	1	3	0	0	0	0	0	3	6	0	1	5
Larne	0	0	0	0	0	0	0	0	0	0	2	8	4	2	2	0	0	0	0	0	0	0	0	0	0	2	8	4	2	2
Derry City (Note: Derry City played in Northern Irish football until 1985, when they joined the League of Ireland and now represent the Republic of Ireland in European competition.)	1	3	1	0	2	0	0	0	0	0	0	0	0	0	0	1	2	0	0	2	0	0	0	0	0	2	5	1	0	4
Dungannon Swifts	0	0	0	0	0	1	2	1	0	1	0	0	0	0	0	0	0	0	0	0	1	2	0	1	1	2	4	1	1	2
Omagh Town (Note: Omagh Town was dissolved in 2005 due to financial problems.)	0	0	0	0	0	0	0	0	0	0	0	0	0	0	0	0	0	0	0	0	2	4	0	1	3	2	4	0	1	3
Carrick Rangers	0	0	0	0	0	0	0	0	0	0	0	0	0	0	0	1	4	1	0	3	0	0	0	0	0	1	4	1	0	3
Newry Town (Note: Newry Town changed its name to Newry City in 2004, and was later dissolved in 2012 due to financial problems.)	0	0	0	0	0	0	0	0	0	0	0	0	0	0	0	0	0	0	0	0	1	4	2	0	2	1	4	2	0	2

Through the 2023/24 season, Northern Irish teams have played against teams from 48 of the 55 UEFA countries. They have yet to play against teams from Armenia, Austria, Kazakhstan, Liechtenstein, Moldova and Russia; and Northern Irish clubs have never been paired with each other.

== Active competitions ==
=== European Cup / UEFA Champions League ===
Season	Club	Round	Opponent	Home	Away	Aggregate
European Cup
1957–58	Glenavon	PR	(Denmark) AGF	0–3	0–0	0–3
1958–59	Ards	PR	(France) Stade Reims	1–4	2–6	3–10
1959–60	Linfield	PR	(Sweden) Göteborg	2–1	1–6	3–7
1960–61	Glenavon	PR	(East Germany) Wismut Karl Marx Stadt	w/o		N/A
1961–62	Linfield	PR	(East Germany) Vorwärts Berlin	w/o	0–3	0–3 (Note: Linfield withdrew from the competition before the home leg was played, as Vorwärts were denied visas for entry into the UK, and it was not financially viable for Linfield to play the match in a neutral country.)
1962–63	Linfield	1R	(Denmark) Esbjerg	1–2	0–0	1–2
1963–64	Distillery	PR	(Portugal) Benfica	3–3	0–5	3–8
1964–65	Glentoran	PR	(Greece) Panathinaikos	2–3	2–2	4–5
1965–66	Derry City	PR	(Norway) Lyn	5–1	3–5	8–6
1965–66	Derry City	1R	(Belgium) Anderlecht	w/o	0–9	0–9 (Note: Derry City withdrew from the competition before the home leg was played, as the IFA ruled that their home ground was not up to standard.)
1966–67	Linfield	1R	(Luxembourg) Aris	6–1	3–3	9–4
1966–67	Linfield	2R	(Norway) Vålerengen	1–1	4–1	5–2
1966–67	Linfield	QF	(Bulgaria) CSKA Sofia	2–2	0–1	2–3
1967–68	Glentoran	1R	(Portugal) Benfica	1–1	0–0	1–1 (a)
1968–69	Glentoran	1R	(Belgium) Anderlecht	2–2	0–3	2–5
1969–70	Linfield	1R	(Socialist Federal Republic of Yugoslavia) Red Star Belgrade	2–4	0–8	2–12
1970–71	Glentoran	1R	(Republic of Ireland) Waterford	1–3	0–1	1–4
1971–72	Linfield	1R	(Belgium) Standard Liège	2–3	0–2	2–5
1972–73	None entered (Note: No clubs entered European competition this season as a result of the security situation in Northern Ireland. The three clubs that missed out were Glentoran (European Cup), Portadown (UEFA Cup) and Coleraine (Cup Winners' Cup).)					
1973–74	Crusaders	1R	(Romania) Dinamo București	0–1	0–11	0–12
1974–75	Coleraine	1R	(Netherlands) Feyenoord	1–4	0–7	1–11
1975–76	Linfield	1R	(Netherlands) PSV Eindhoven	1–2	0–8	1–10
1976–77	Crusaders	1R	(England) Liverpool	0–5	0–2	0–7
1977–78	Glentoran	1R	(Iceland) Valur	2–0	0–1	2–1
1977–78	Glentoran	2R	(Italy) Juventus	0–1	0–5	0–6
1978–79	Linfield	1R	(Norway) Lillestrøm	0–0	0–1	0–1
1979–80	Linfield	PR	(Republic of Ireland) Dundalk	0–2	1–1	1–3
1980–81	Linfield	1R	(France) Nantes	0–1	0–2	0–3
1981–82	Glentoran	1R	(Luxembourg) Progrès Niederkorn	4–0	1–1	5–1
1981–82	Glentoran	2R	(Bulgaria) CSKA Sofia	2–1	0–2	2–3
1982–83	Linfield	1R	(Albania) 17 Nëntori	2–1	0–1	2–2 (a)
1983–84	Linfield	1R	(Portugal) Benfica	2–3	0–3	2–6
1984–85	Linfield	1R	(Republic of Ireland) Shamrock Rovers	0–0	1–1	1–1 (a)
1984–85	Linfield	2R	(Greece) Panathinaikos	3–3	1–2	4–5
1985–86	Linfield	1R	(Switzerland) Servette	2–2	1–2	3–4
1986–87	Linfield	1R	(Norway) Rosenborg	1–1	0–1	1–2
1987–88	Linfield	1R	(Norway) Lillestrøm	2–4	1–1	3–5
1988–89	Glentoran	1R	(Soviet Union) Spartak Moscow	1–1	0–2	1–3
1989–90	Linfield	1R	(Soviet Union) Dnipro Dnipropetrovsk	1–2	0–1	1–3
1990–91	Portadown	1R	(Portugal) Porto	1–8	0–5	1–13
1991–92	Portadown	1R	(Socialist Federal Republic of Yugoslavia) Red Star Belgrade	0–4	0–4	0–8
UEFA Champions League
1992–93	Glentoran	1R	(France) Marseille	0–5	0–3	0–8
1993–94	Linfield	PR	(Georgia (country)) Dinamo Tbilisi	1–1	1–2	2–3 (Note: Dinamo Tbilisi were later expelled from the tournament and suspended from UEFA tournaments for two years for allegedly attempting to bribe match officials. Linfield were reinstated.)
1993–94	Linfield	1R	(Denmark) Copenhagen	3–0	0–4	3–4
1994–95	None entered (Note: No clubs entered the Champions League during these seasons as a result of restructuring by UEFA, with entry to the competition limited to the continent's top 24 countries. The league champions entered the UEFA Cup instead.)					
1995–96	None entered					
1996–97	None entered					
1997–98	Crusaders	1QR	(Georgia (country)) Dinamo Tbilisi	1–3	1–5	2–8
1998–99	Cliftonville	1QR	(Slovakia) Košice	1–5	0–8	1–13
1999–00	Glentoran	1QR	(Bulgaria) Litex Lovech	0–2	0–3	0–5
2000–01	Linfield	1QR	(Finland) Haka	2–1	0–1	2–2 (a)
2001–02	Linfield	1QR	(Georgia (country)) Torpedo Kutaisi	0–0	0–1	0–1
2002–03	Portadown	1QR	(Belarus) Belshyna	0–0	2–3	2–3
2003–04	Glentoran	1QR	(Finland) HJK	0–0	0–1	0–1
2004–05	Linfield	1QR	(Finland) HJK	0–1	0–1	0–2
2005–06	Glentoran	1QR	(Republic of Ireland) Shelbourne	1–2	1–4	2–6
2006–07	Linfield	1QR	(Slovenia) Gorica	1–3	2–2	3–5
2007–08	Linfield	1QR	(Sweden) Elfsborg	0–0	0–1	0–1
2008–09	Linfield	1QR	(Croatia) Dinamo Zagreb	0–2	1–1	1–3
2009–10	Glentoran	2QR	(Israel) Maccabi Haifa	0–4	0–6	0–10
2010–11	Linfield	2QR	(Norway) Rosenborg	0–0	0–2	0–2
2011–12	Linfield	2QR	(Belarus) BATE Borisov	1–1	0–2	1–3
2012–13	Linfield	1QR	(Faroe Islands) B36 Tórshavn	0–0	0–0	0–0 (4–3 p)
2012–13	Linfield	2QR	(Cyprus) AEL Limassol	0–0	0–3	0–3
2013–14	Cliftonville	2QR	(Scotland) Celtic	0–3	0–2	0–5
2014–15	Cliftonville	2QR	(Hungary) Debrecen	0–0	0–2	0–2
2015–16	Crusaders	1QR	(Estonia) Levadia Tallinn	0–0	1–1	1–1 (a)
2015–16	Crusaders	2QR	(Albania) Skënderbeu Korçë	3–2	1–4	4–6
2016–17	Crusaders	2QR	(Denmark) Copenhagen	0–3	0–6	0–9
2017–18	Linfield	1QR	(San Marino) La Fiorita	1–0	0–0	1–0
2017–18	Linfield	2QR	(Scotland) Celtic	0–2	0–4	0–6
2018–19	Crusaders	1QR	(Bulgaria) Ludogorets	0–2	0–7	0–9
2019–20	Linfield	1QR	(Norway) Rosenborg	0–2	0–4	0–6
2020–21	Linfield	PR	(San Marino) Tre Fiori	2–0	N/A	2–0
2020–21	Linfield	PR	(Kosovo) Dirta	3–0	N/A	3–0 (awd.) (Note: The Drita v Linfield match, originally scheduled to be played on 11 August 2020, could not be played due to two players from Drita testing positive for SARS-2 coronavirus and the whole team being put into quarantine by the Swiss authorities. Linfield were subsequently awarded a technical 3–0 victory by UEFA according to the regulations related to COVID-19.)
2020–21	Linfield	1QR	(Poland) Legia Warsaw	0–1	N/A	0–1
2021–22	Linfield	1QR	(Lithuania) Žalgiris	1–3	1–2	2–5
2022–23	Linfield	1QR	(Wales) The New Saints	2–0	0–1	2–1
2022–23	Linfield	2QR	(Norway) Bodø/Glimt	1–0	0–8	1–8
2023–24	Larne	1QR	(Finland) HJK Helsinki	0–1	2–2	2–3
2024–25	Larne	1QR	(Latvia) RFS	0–4	0–3	0–7
2025–26	Linfield	1QR	(Republic of Ireland) Shelbourne	1–1	0–1	1–2
2026–27	Larne	1QR	(San Marino) Tre Fiori	2–1	1–0	3–1
2026–27	Larne	2QR	(Serbia) Red Star Belgrade	0–5	0–4	0–9

PR = Preliminary round; 1R/2R = First/Second round; 1QR/2QR = First/Second qualifying round; QF = Quarter-finals

=== Inter-Cities Fairs Cup / UEFA Cup / UEFA Europa League ===
Season	Club	Round	Opponent	Home	Away	Aggregate
Inter-Cities Fairs Cup
1962–63	Glentoran	1R	(Spain) Real Zaragoza	0–2	2–6	2–8
1963–64	Glentoran	1R	(Scotland) Partick Thistle	1–4	0–3	1–7
1965–66	Glentoran	1R	(Belgium) Royal Antwerp	3–3	0–1	3–4
1967–68	Linfield	1R	(East Germany) Lokomotive Leipzig	1–0	1–5	2–5
1968–69	Linfield	1R	(Portugal) Vitória de Setúbal	1–3	0–3	1–6
1969–70	Glentoran	1R	(England) Arsenal	1–0	0–3	1–3
1969–70	Coleraine	1R	(Luxembourg) Jeunesse Esch	4–0	2–3	6–3
1969–70	Coleraine	2R	(Belgium) Anderlecht	3–7	1–6	4–13
1970–71	Coleraine	1R	(Scotland) Kilmarnock	1–1	3–2	4–3
1970–71	Coleraine	2R	(Netherlands) Sparta Rotterdam	1–2	0–2	1–4
UEFA Cup
1971–72	Glentoran	1R	(West Germany) Eintracht Braunschweig	0–1	1–6	1–7
1972–73	None entered					
1973–74	Ards	1R	(Belgium) Standard Liège	3–2	1–6	4–8
1974–75	Portadown	1R	(Iceland) Valur	2–1	0–0	2–1
1974–75	Portadown	2R	(Socialist Federal Republic of Yugoslavia) Partizan	1–1	0–5	1–6
1975–76	Glentoran	1R	(Netherlands) Ajax	1–6	0–8	1–14
1976–77	Glentoran	1R	(Switzerland) Basel	3–2	0–3	3–5
1977–78	Glenavon	1R	(Netherlands) PSV Eindhoven	2–6	0–5	2–11
1978–79	Glentoran	1R	(Iceland) IBV	1–1	0–0	1–1 (a)
1979–80	Glenavon	1R	(Belgium) Standard Liège	0–1	0–1	0–2
1980–81	Ballymena United	1R	(East Germany) Vorwärts Frankfurt	2–1	0–3	2–4
1981–82	Linfield	1R	(Belgium) Beveren	0–3	0–5	0–8
1982–83	Glentoran	1R	(Czechoslovakia) Baník Ostrava	1–3	0–1	1–4
1983–84	Coleraine	1R	(Netherlands) Sparta Rotterdam	1–1	0–4	1–5
1984–85	Glentoran	1R	(Belgium) Standard Liège	1–1	0–2	1–3
1985–86	Coleraine	1R	(East Germany) Lokomotive Leipzig	1–1	0–5	1–6
1986–87	Coleraine	1R	(East Germany) Stahl Brandenburg	1–1	0–1	1–2
1987–88	Coleraine	1R	(Scotland) Dundee United	0–1	1–3	1–4
1988–89	Linfield	1R	(Finland) TPS Turku	1–1	0–0	1–1 (a)
1989–90	Glentoran	1R	(Scotland) Dundee United	1–3	0–2	1–5
1990–91	Glenavon	1R	(France) Bordeaux	0–0	0–2	0–2
1991–92	Bangor	1R	(Czechoslovakia) Sigma Olomouc	0–3	0–3	0–6
1992–93	Portadown	1R	(Belgium) Standard Liège	0–0	0–5	0–5
1993–94	Crusaders	1R	(Switzerland) Servette	0–0	0–4	0–4
1994–95	Portadown	PR	(Slovakia) Slovan Bratislava	0–2	0–3	0–5
1994–95	Linfield	PR	(Iceland) FH	3–1	0–1	3–2
1994–95	Linfield	1R	(Denmark) Odense	1–1	0–5	1–6
1995–96	Crusaders	PR	(Denmark) Silkeborg	1–2	0–4	1–6
1995–96	Glenavon	PR	(Iceland) FH	0–0	1–0	1–0
1995–96	Glenavon	1R	(Germany) Werder Bremen	0–2	0–5	0–7
1996–97	Crusaders	PR	(Lithuania) Zalgiris Vilnius	2–1	0–2	2–3
1996–97	Portadown	PR	(Serbia and Montenegro) Vojvodina	0–1	1–4	1–5
1997–98	Coleraine	1QR	(Switzerland) Grasshoppers	1–7	0–3	1–10
1998–99	Linfield	1QR	(Cyprus) Omonia	5–3	1–5	6–8
1999–00	Linfield	QR	(Georgia (country)) Locomotive Tbilisi	1–1	0–1	1–2
1999–00	Portadown	QR	(Bulgaria) CSKA Sofia	0–3	0–5	0–8
2000–01	Coleraine	QR	(Sweden) Örgryte	1–2	0–1	1–3
2000–01	Glentoran	QR	(Norway) Lillestrøm	0–3	0–1	0–4
2001–02	Glenavon	QR	(Scotland) Kilmarnock	0–1	0–1	0–2
2001–02	Glentoran	QR	(Denmark) Midtjylland	0–4	1–1	1–5
2002–03	Glentoran	QR	(Poland) Wisła Kraków	0–2	0–4	0–6
2002–03	Linfield	QR	(Norway) Stabæk	1–1	0–4	1–5
2003–04	Coleraine	QR	(Portugal) União de Leiria	2–1	0–5	2–6
2003–04	Portadown	QR	(Sweden) Malmö	0–2	0–4	0–6
2004–05	Portadown	1QR	(Lithuania) Žalgiris Vilnius	2–2	0–2	2–4
2004–05	Glentoran	1QR	(Finland) Allianssi	2–2	2–1	4–3
2004–05	Glentoran	2QR	(Sweden) Elfsborg	0–1	1–2	1–3
2005–06	Portadown	1QR	(Norway) Viking	1–2	0–1	1–3
2005–06	Linfield	1QR	(Latvia) Ventspils	1–0	1–2	2–2 (a)
2005–06	Linfield	2QR	(Sweden) Halmstad	2–4	1–1	3–5
2006–07	Glentoran	1QR	(Norway) Brann	0–1	0–1	0–2
2006–07	Portadown	1QR	(Lithuania) Kaunas	1–3	0–1	1–4
2007–08	Dungannon Swifts	1QR	(Lithuania) Sūduva	1–0	0–4	1–4
2007–08	Glentoran	1QR	(Sweden) AIK	0–5	0–4	0–9
2008–09	Cliftonville	1QR	(Denmark) Copenhagen	0–4	0–7	0–11
2008–09	Glentoran	1QR	(Latvia) Liepājas Metalurgs	1–1	0–2	1–3
UEFA Europa League
2009–10	Linfield	1QR	(Denmark) Randers	0–3	0–4	0–7
2009–10	Lisburn Distillery	1QR	(Georgia (country)) Zestaponi	1–5	0–6	1–11
2009–10	Crusaders	2QR	(North Macedonia) Rabotnički	1–1	2–4	3–5
2010–11	Glentoran	1QR	(Iceland) KR Reykjavík	2–2	0–3	2–5
2010–11	Portadown	1QR	(Latvia) Skonto	1–1	1–0	2–1
2010–11	Portadown	2QR	(Azerbaijan) Qarabağ	1–2	1–1	2–3
2010–11	Cliftonville	2QR	(Croatia) Cibalia	1–0	0–0	1–0
2010–11	Cliftonville	3QR	(Bulgaria) CSKA Sofia	1–2	0–3	1–5
2011–12	Cliftonville	1QR	(Wales) The New Saints	0–1	1–1	1–2
2011–12	Glentoran	1QR	(North Macedonia) Renova	2–1	1–2	3–3 (3–2 p)
2011–12	Glentoran	2QR	(Ukraine) Vorskla Poltava	0–2	0–3	0–5
2011–12	Crusaders	2QR	(England) Fulham	1–3	0–4	1–7
2012–13	Cliftonville	1QR	(Sweden) Kalmar	1–0	0–4	1–4
2012–13	Crusaders	1QR	(Norway) Rosenborg	0–3	0–1	0–4
2012–13	Portadown	1QR	(North Macedonia) Shkëndija	2–1	0–0	2–1
2012–13	Portadown	2QR	(Croatia) Slaven Belupo	2–4	0–6	2–10
2013–14	Crusaders	1QR	(Norway) Rosenborg	1–2	2–7	3–9
2013–14	Glentoran	1QR	(Iceland) KR Reykjavík	0–3	0–0	0–3
2013–14	Linfield	1QR	(Faroe Islands) ÍF Fuglafjørður	3–0	2–0	5–0
2013–14	Linfield	2QR	(Greece) Skoda Xanthi	1–2	1–0	2–2 (a)
2014–15	Glenavon	1QR	(Iceland) FH	2–3	0–3	2–6
2014–15	Crusaders	1QR	(Lithuania) Ekranas	3–1	2–1	5–2
2014–15	Crusaders	2QR	(Sweden) Brommapojkarna	1–1	0–4	1–5
2014–15	Linfield	1QR	(Faroe Islands) B36 Tórshavn	1–1	2–1	3–2
2014–15	Linfield	2QR	(Sweden) AIK	1–0	0–2	1–2
2015–16	Glenavon	1QR	(Belarus) Shakhtyor Soligorsk	1–2	0–3	1–5
2015–16	Glentoran	1QR	(Slovakia) MŠK Žilina	1–4	0–3	1–7
2015–16	Linfield	1QR	(Faroe Islands) NSÍ Runavík	2–0	3–4	5–4
2015–16	Linfield	2QR	(Slovakia) Spartak Trnava	1–3	1–2	2–5
2016–17	Glenavon	1QR	(Iceland) KR Reykjavík	0–6	1–2	1–8
2016–17	Linfield	1QR	(Republic of Ireland) Cork City	0–1	1–1	1–2
2016–17	Cliftonville	1QR	(Luxembourg) FC Differdange 03	2–0	1–1	3–1
2016–17	Cliftonville	2QR	(Cyprus) AEK Larnaca	2–3	0–2	2–5
2017–18	Ballymena United	1QR	(Norway) Odds	0–2	0–3	0–5
2017–18	Coleraine	1QR	(Norway) Haugesund	0–0	0–7	0–7
2017–18	Crusaders	1QR	(Latvia) Liepāja	3–1	0–2	3–3 (a)
2018–19	Cliftonville	1QR	(Denmark) Nordsjælland	0–1	1–2	1–3
2018–19	Coleraine	1QR	(Serbia) Spartak Subotica	1–1	0–2	1–3
2018–19	Glenavon	1QR	(Norway) Molde	2–1	1–5	3–6
2019–20	Ballymena United	PR	(Faroe Islands) NSÍ Runavík	2–0	0–0	2–0
2019–20	Ballymena United	1QR	(Sweden) Malmö	0–4	0–7	0–11
2019–20	Cliftonville	PR	(Wales) Barry Town United	4–0	0–0	4–0
2019–20	Cliftonville	1QR	(Norway) Haugesund	0–1	1–5	1–6
2019–20	Crusaders	1QR	(Faroe Islands) B36 Tórshavn	2–0	3–2	5–2
2019–20	Crusaders	2QR	(England) Wolverhampton Wanderers	1–4	0–2	1–6
2019–20	Linfield	2QR	(Faroe Islands) HB Tórshavn	1–0	2–2	3–2
2019–20	Linfield	3QR	(Montenegro) Sutjeska Nikšić	3–2	2–1	5–3
2019–20	Linfield	PLR	(Azerbaijan) Qarabağ	3–2	1–2	4–4 (a)
2020–21	Coleraine	PR	(San Marino) HB La Fiorita	1–0	—N/a	1–0
2020–21	Coleraine	QR1	(Slovenia) Maribor	1–1 (5–4 p)	—N/a	1–1 (5–4 p)
2020–21	Coleraine	QR2	(Scotland) Motherwell	2–2 (0–3 p)	—N/a	2–2 (0–3 p)
2020–21	Glentoran	PR	(Faroe Islands) HB Tórshavn	1–0	—N/a	1–0
2020–21	Glentoran	QR1	(Scotland) Motherwell	1–5	—N/a	1–5
2020–21	Linfield	QR2	(Malta) Floriana	0–1	—N/a	0–1
2022–23	Linfield	3QR	(Switzerland) Zürich	0–2	0–3	0–5
2026–27	Larne	3QR	(Georgia (country)) Iberia 1999	0–0	1–2 (a.e.t.)	1–2

=== UEFA Europa Conference League ===
Season	Club	Round	Opponent	Home	Away	Aggregate
UEFA Europa Conference League
2021–22	Coleraine	1QR	(Bosnia and Herzegovina) Velež Mostar	1–2	1–2	2–4
2021–22	Glentoran	1QR	(Wales) The New Saints	1–1	0–2	1–3
2021–22	Larne	1QR	(Wales) Bala Town	1–0	1–0	2–0
2021–22	Larne	2QR	(Denmark) AGF	2–1	1–1	3–2
2021–22	Larne	3QR	(Portugal) Paços de Ferreira	1–0	0–4	1–4
2021–22	Linfield	2QR	(Bosnia and Herzegovina) Borac Banja Luka	4–0	0–0	4–0
2021–22	Linfield	3QR	(Luxembourg) Fola Esch	1–2	1–2	2–4
2022–23	Cliftonville	1QR	(Slovakia) Dunajská Streda	0–3	1–2	1–5
2022–23	Crusaders	1QR	(Gibraltar) Bruno's Magpies	3–1	1–2	3–1
2022–23	Crusaders	2QR	(Switzerland) Basel	1–1	0–2	1–3
2022–23	Larne	1QR	(Gibraltar) St Joseph's	0–1	0–0	0–1
2022–23	Linfield	PO	(Latvia) RFS	1–1	2–2	3–3 (2–4 p)
2023–24	Linfield	1QR	(Albania) Vllaznia	3-1	0-1	3-2
2023–24	Linfield	2QR	(Poland) Pogoń Szczecin	2-5	2-3	4-8
2023–24	Glentoran	1QR	(Malta) Gżira	2-2	1-1	3-3 (13–14 p)
2023–24	Crusaders	1QR	(Finland) FC Haka	2-2	1-0	3-2
2023–24	Crusaders	2QR	(Norway) Rosenborg	2-2	2-3 (a.e.t)	4-5
2023–24	Larne	2QR	(Kosovo) FC Ballkani	0-3	1-4	1-7
2024–25	Crusaders	1QR	(Wales) Caernarfon Town	3-1	0-2	3-3 (7–8 p)
2024–25	Linfield	1QR	(Iceland) Stjarnan	3-2	0-2	3-4
2024–25	Cliftonville	2QR	(Latvia) Auda	1-2	0-2	1-4
2024–25	Larne	2QR	N/A	3-0	3-0	6-0
2024–25	Larne	3QR	(Kosovo) Ballkani	0-1	1-0	1-1 (4–1 p)
2024–25	Larne	PO	(Gibraltar) Lincoln Red Imps	3-1	1-2	4-3
2024–25	Larne	GS	(Norway) Molde	N/A	0-3	34th out of 36 teams
2024–25	Larne	GS	(Republic of Ireland) Shamrock Rovers	1-4	N/A	34th out of 36 teams
2024–25	Larne	GS	(Switzerland) St. Gallen	1-2	N/A	34th out of 36 teams
2024–25	Larne	GS	(Slovenia) Olimpija Ljubljana	N/A	0-1	34th out of 36 teams
2024–25	Larne	GS	(Belarus) Dinamo Minsk	N/A	0-2	34th out of 36 teams
2024–25	Larne	GS	(Belgium) Gent	1-0	N/A	34th out of 36 teams
2025–26	Larne	1QR	(Latvia) Auda	0–0	2–2 (a.e.t.)	2–2 (4–2 p)
2025–26	Larne	2QR	(Kosovo) Prishtina	0–0	1–1 (a.e.t.)	1–1 (5–4 p)
2025–26	Larne	3QR	(Portugal) Santa Clara	0–3	0–0	0–3
2025–26	Cliftonville	1QR	(Gibraltar) St Joseph's	2–3 (a.e.t.)	2–2	4–5
2025–26	Linfield	2QR	(Lithuania) Žalgiris	2–0	0–0	2–0
2025–26	Linfield	3QR	(Faroe Islands) Víkingur Gøta	2–0	1–2	3–2
2025–26	Linfield	PO	(Republic of Ireland) Shelbourne	0–2	1–3	1–5
2025–26	Dungannon Swifts	2QR	(Liechtenstein) Vaduz	0–3 (a.e.t.)	1–0	1–3
2026–27	Glentoran	1QR	(Latvia) RFS	1–2	0–2	1–4
2026–27	Linfield	1QR	(Estonia) Nõmme Kalju	2–2	0–1	2–3
2026–27	Coleraine	2QR	(Finland) HJK	0–3	0–5	0–8
2026–27	Larne	PO	(Gibraltar) Lincoln Red Imps	0–3 (a.e.t.)	2–0	2–3

PR = Preliminary round; QR = Qualifying round; 1R/2R = First/Second round; 1QR/2QR/3QR = First/Second/Third qualifying round; PLR = Playoff round

== Defunct competitions ==
=== European Cup Winners' Cup / UEFA Cup Winners' Cup ===
Season	Club	Round	Opponent	Home	Away	Aggregate
European Cup Winners' Cup
1961–62	Glenavon	PR	(England) Leicester City	1–4	1–3	2–7
1962–63	Portadown	1R	(Socialist Federal Republic of Yugoslavia) OFK Beograd	3–2	1–5	4–7
1963–64	Linfield	2R	(Turkey) Fenerbahçe	2–0	1–4	3–4
1964–65	Derry City	1R	(Romania) Steaua București	0–2	0–3	0–5
1965–66	Coleraine	1R	(Soviet Union) Dynamo Kyiv	1–6	0–4	1–10
1966–67	Glentoran	1R	(Scotland) Rangers	1–1	0–4	1–5
1967–68	Crusaders	1R	(Spain) Valencia	2–4	0–4	2–8
1968–69	Crusaders	1R	(Sweden) Norrköping	2–2	1–4	3–6
1969–70	Ards	1R	(Italy) Roma	0–0	1–3	1–3
1970–71	Linfield	1R	(England) Manchester City	2–1	0–1	2–2 (a)
1971–72	Distillery	1R	(Spain) Barcelona	1–3	0–4	1–7
1972–73	None entered					
1973–74	Glentoran	1R	(Romania) Chimia Râmnicu Vâlcea	2–0	2–2	4–2
1973–74	Glentoran	2R	(Norway) Brann	3–1	1–1	4–2
1973–74	Glentoran	QF	(West Germany) Borussia Mönchengladbach	0–2	0–5	0–7
1974–75	Ards	1R	(Netherlands) PSV Eindhoven	1–4	0–10	1–14
1975–76	Coleraine	1R	(West Germany) Eintracht Frankfurt	2–6	1–5	3–11
1976–77	Carrick Rangers	1R	(Luxembourg) Aris	3–1	1–2	4–3
1976–77	Carrick Rangers	2R	(England) Southampton	2–5	1–4	3–9
1977–78	Coleraine	1R	(East Germany) Lokomotive Leipzig	1–4	2–2	3–6
1978–79	Ballymena United	1R	(Belgium) Beveren	0–3	0–3	0–6
1979–80	Cliftonville	1R	(France) Nantes	0–1	0–7	0–8
1980–81	Crusaders	1R	(Wales) Newport County	0–0	0–4	0–4
1981–82	Ballymena United	1R	(Italy) Roma	0–2	0–4	0–6
1982–83	Coleraine	1R	(England) Tottenham Hotspur	0–3	0–4	0–7
1983–84	Glentoran	1R	(France) Paris Saint-Germain	1–2	1–2	2–4
1984–85	Ballymena United	1R	(Malta) Ħamrun Spartans	0–1	1–2	1–3
1985–86	Glentoran	1R	(Iceland) Fram Reykjavík	1–0	1–3	2–3
1986–87	Glentoran	1R	(East Germany) Lokomotive Leipzig	1–1	0–2	1–3
1987–88	Glentoran	1R	(Finland) RoPS	1–1	0–0	1–1 (a)
1988–89	Glenavon	1R	(Denmark) AGF	1–4	1–3	2–7
1989–90	Ballymena United	1R	(Belgium) Anderlecht	0–4	0–6	0–10
1990–91	Glentoran	1R	(Romania) Steaua București	1–1	0–5	1–6
1991–92	Glenavon	1R	(Finland) Ilves	3–2	1–2	4–4 (a)
1992–93	Glenavon	1R	(Belgium) Royal Antwerp	1–1	1–1	2–2 (1–3p)
1993–94	Bangor	QR	(Cyprus) APOEL	1–1	1–2	2–3
UEFA Cup Winners' Cup
1994–95	Bangor	QR	(Slovakia) Tatran Prešov	0–1	0–4	0–5
1995–96	Linfield	QR	(Ukraine) Shakhtar Donetsk	0–1	1–4	1–5
1996–97	Glentoran	QR	(Czech Republic) Sparta Prague	1–2	0–8	1–10
1997–98	Glenavon	QR	(Poland) Legia Warsaw	1–1	0–4	1–5
1998–99	Glentoran	QR	(Israel) Maccabi Haifa	0–1	1–2	1–3

PR = Preliminary round; QR = Qualifying round; 1R/2R = First/Second round; QF = Quarter-finals

=== UEFA Intertoto Cup ===
Season	Club	Round	Opponent	Home	Away	Aggregate
1996	Cliftonville	GS	(Belgium) Standard Liège	0–3		
1996	Cliftonville	GS	(Israel) Hapoel Haifa		1–1	
1996	Cliftonville	GS	(Germany) Stuttgart	1–4		
1996	Cliftonville	GS	(Denmark) AaB		0–4	
1997	Ards	GS	(Belgium) Royal Antwerp	0–1		
1997	Ards	GS	(Cyprus) Nea Salamis Famagusta		1–4	
1997	Ards	GS	(France) Auxerre	0–3		
1997	Ards	GS	(Switzerland) Lausanne Sports		0–6	
1998	Omagh Town	1R	(Slovakia) Rimavská Sobota	2–2	0–1	2–3
1999	Newry Town	1R	(Croatia) Hrvatski Dragovoljac	2–0	0–1	2–1
1999	Newry Town	2R	(Germany) MSV Duisburg	1–0	0–2	1–2
2000	Glenavon	1R	(Croatia) Slaven Belupo	1–1	0–3	1–4
2001	Cliftonville	1R	(Moldova) Tiligul Tiraspol	1–3	0–1	1–4
2002	Coleraine	1R	(Andorra) Sant Julià	5–0	2–2	7–2
2002	Coleraine	2R	(France) Troyes	1–2	1–2	2–4
2003	Omagh Town	1R	(Belarus) Shakhtyor Soligorsk	1–7	0–1	1–8
2004	Ballymena United	1R	(Denmark) Odense	0–7	0–0	0–7
2005	Lisburn Distillery	1R	(Lithuania) Žalgiris Vilnius	0–1	0–1	0–2
2006	Dungannon Swifts	1R	(Iceland) Keflavik	0–0	1–4	1–4
2007	Cliftonville	1R	(Latvia) Dinaburg	1–1	1–0	2–1
2007	Cliftonville	2R	(Belgium) Gent	0–4	0–2	0–6
2008	Lisburn Distillery	1R	(Finland) TPS Turku	2–3	1–3	3–6

GS = Group stage; 1R/2R = First/Second round

== See also ==
- List of football matches between British clubs in UEFA competitions
- Association football in Northern Ireland
