= Andrew Taylor (businessman) =

English businessman (born 1957)

Andrew Taylor (born 2 November 1957 in Plymouth, England) was previously chairman and CEO of McDonald's UK. He attended the University of Leicester.

Taylor became the 23rd chairman of Leicester City on 14 April 2006, replacing Jim McCahill. He had been a fan of the club for more than 30 years. He resigned on 1 February 2007, being replaced by Milan Mandarić.
