= Jim McCahill =

Jim McCahill (born c. 1939) is the former chairman of Leicester City F.C. He first took the post in May 2003, and was succeeded by Andrew Taylor on 1 June 2006. When Taylor resigned on 1 February 2007, McCahill resumed the chairmanship on a temporary basis until Milan Mandarić's takeover of the club was formally completed in March 2007.
